= List of actors who have played Superman =

The following is a list of actors who have played Superman in various media. It primarily features portrayals of Clark Kent, but also includes performances of other characters who have assumed the Superman mantle.

== Radio and audio dramas ==
| Name | Title | Date | Type |
|---|---|---|---|
| Bud Collyer | The Adventures of Superman | 1940–1950 | Radio series (Mutual) |
| Michael Fitzmaurice | The Adventures of Superman | 1950–1951 | Radio series (ABC) |
| Leonard Teale | The Adventures of Superman | 1949–1954 | Radio (Australian) |
| Stuart Milligan | Superman On Trial | 1988 | BBC Radio |
| Stuart Milligan | The Adventures of Superman | 1990 | BBC Radio |
| Stuart Milligan | Superman: Doomsday & Beyond | 1993 | BBC Radio |
| Marc Thompson | All-Star Superman | 2025 | Audio drama |
| Marc Thompson | Kingdom Come | 2025 | Audio drama |

== Stage plays ==
| Name | Title | Date | Type and location |
|---|---|---|---|
| Bob Holiday | It's a Bird... It's a Plane... It's Superman | 1966 | Stage musical (Broadway) |
| Gary Jackson | It's a Bird... It's a Plane... It's Superman | 1992 | Goodspeed Opera House production |
| Cheyenne Jackson | It's a Bird... It's a Plane... It's Superman | 2007 | Los Angeles/New York revival |
| Matt Cavenaugh | It's a Bird... It's a Plane... It's Superman | 2010 | Revised Dallas Theater Center production |
| Brian Holden | Holy Musical B@man! | 2012 | StarKid musical parody |
| Edward Watts | It's a Bird... It's a Plane... It's Superman | 2013 | Encores! concert |
| Craig Berry | It's a Bird... It's a Plane... It's Superman | 2014–2015 | British production |

== Television and DTV films ==
| Name | Title | Date | Type |
|---|---|---|---|
| David Wilson | It's a Bird... It's a Plane... It's Superman | 1975 | Television special (ABC) |
| Tim Daly | The Batman/Superman Movie: World's Finest | 1997 | Animated television compilation film |
| Tim Daly | Superman: Brainiac Attacks | 2006 | Animated direct-to-video film |
| Tim Daly | Superman/Batman: Public Enemies | 2009 | Animated direct-to-video film |
| Tim Daly | Superman/Batman: Apocalypse | 2010 | Animated direct-to-video film |
| Tim Daly | Justice League: Doom | 2012 | Animated direct-to-video film |
| George Newbern | Superman/Shazam!: The Return of Black Adam | 2010 | Animated direct-to-video short film |
| George Newbern | Superman vs. The Elite | 2012 | Animated direct-to-video film |
| George Newbern | Justice League vs. the Fatal Five | 2019 | Animated direct-to-video film |
| Travis Willingham | Lego Batman: The Movie – DC Super Heroes Unite | 2013 | Animated direct-to-video film |
| Travis Willingham | Batman and Superman: Battle of the Super Sons | 2022 | Animated direct-to-video film |
| Travis Willingham | Justice League × RWBY: Super Heroes & Huntsmen Part II | 2023 | Animated direct-to-video film |
| Breckin Meyer | Robot Chicken DC Comics Special | 2012 | Stop-motion/animated television special |
| Breckin Meyer | Robot Chicken DC Comics Special 2: Villains in Paradise | 2014 | Stop-motion/animated television special |
| Breckin Meyer | Robot Chicken DC Comics Special III: Magical Friendship | 2015 | Stop-motion/animated television special |
Nolan North
| Nolan North | Lego DC Comics: Batman Be-Leaguered | 2014 | Animated made-for-television short film |
| Nolan North | Lego DC Comics Super Heroes: Justice League vs. Bizarro League | 2015 | Animated direct-to-video film |
| Nolan North | Lego DC Comics Super Heroes: Justice League – Attack of the Legion of Doom | 2015 | Animated direct-to-video film |
| Nolan North | Lego DC Comics Super Heroes: Justice League – Cosmic Clash | 2016 | Animated direct-to-video film |
| Nolan North | Lego DC Comics Super Heroes: The Flash | 2018 | Animated direct-to-video film |
| Nolan North | Lego DC Comics Super Heroes: Aquaman – Rage of Atlantis | 2018 | Animated direct-to-video film |
| Nolan North | Lego DC Shazam! Magic and Monsters | 2020 | Animated direct-to-video film |
| Nolan North | Batman: Death in the Family | 2020 | Animated direct-to-video film |
| Nolan North | Scooby-Doo! and Krypto, Too! | 2023 | Animated direct-to-video film |
| Jerry O'Connell | Justice League: Throne of Atlantis | 2015 | Animated direct-to-video film |
| Jerry O'Connell | Justice League vs. Teen Titans | 2016 | Animated direct-to-video film |
| Jerry O'Connell | Justice League Dark | 2017 | Animated direct-to-video film |
| Jerry O'Connell | The Death of Superman | 2018 | Animated direct-to-video film |
| Jerry O'Connell | Reign of the Supermen | 2019 | Animated direct-to-video film |
| Jerry O'Connell | Batman: Hush | 2019 | Animated direct-to-video film |
| Jerry O'Connell | Justice League Dark: Apokolips War | 2020 | Animated direct-to-video film |
| Darren Criss | Superman: Man of Tomorrow | 2020 | Animated direct-to-video film |
| Darren Criss | Justice Society: World War II | 2021 | Animated direct-to-video film |
| Darren Criss | Legion of Super-Heroes | 2023 | Animated direct-to-video film |
| Darren Criss | Justice League: Warworld | 2023 | Animated direct-to-video film |
| Darren Criss | Justice League: Crisis on Infinite Earths | 2024 | Animated direct-to-video film |
| Christopher Reeve | Superman II: The Richard Donner Cut | 2006 | Director's cut of Superman II (1980) |
| Adam Baldwin | Superman: Doomsday | 2007 | Animated direct-to-video film |
| Kyle MacLachlan | Justice League: The New Frontier | 2008 | Animated direct-to-video film |
| Mark Harmon | Justice League: Crisis on Two Earths | 2010 | Animated direct-to-video film |
| James Denton | All-Star Superman | 2011 | Animated direct-to-video film |
| Mark Valley | Batman: The Dark Knight Returns - Part 2 | 2013 | Animated direct-to-video film |
| Matt Bomer | Superman: Unbound | 2013 | Animated direct-to-video film |
| Sam Daly | Justice League: The Flashpoint Paradox | 2013 | Animated direct-to-video film |
| Peter Jessop | JLA Adventures: Trapped in Time | 2014 | Animated direct-to-video film |
| Alan Tudyk | Justice League: War | 2014 | Animated direct-to-video film |
| Benjamin Bratt | Justice League: Gods and Monsters | 2015 | Animated direct-to-video film |
| Jason Isaacs | Superman: Red Son | 2020 | Animated direct-to-video film |
| Henry Cavill | Zack Snyder's Justice League | 2021 | HBO Max release, director's cut of Justice League (2017) |
| Justin Hartley | Injustice | 2021 | Animated direct-to-video film |
| Max Mittelman | Teen Titans Go! & DC Super Hero Girls: Mayhem in the Multiverse | 2022 | Animated direct-to-video film |
| Chandler Riggs | Justice League x RWBY: Super Heroes & Huntsmen Part I | 2023 | Animated direct-to-video film |
| Takaya Kamikawa | Batman Ninja vs. Yakuza League | 2025 | Anime film, Japanese |
| Aaron Campbell | Batman Ninja vs. Yakuza League | 2025 | Anime film, English dub |

== Television series ==
| Name | Title | Date | Type |
|---|---|---|---|
| George Reeves | Adventures of Superman | 1952–1958 | Syndicated series |
| Bud Collyer | The New Adventures of Superman | 1966–1970 | Animated series, broadcast on CBS |
| Bud Collyer | The Superman/Aquaman Hour of Adventure | 1967–1968 | Animated series, broadcast on CBS |
| Bud Collyer | The Batman/Superman Hour | 1968–1969 | Animated series, broadcast on CBS |
| Bob Hastings | The Adventures of Superboy | 1966–1968 | Animated series, broadcast on CBS |
| Bob Hastings | The Superman/Aquaman Hour of Adventure | 1967–1968 | Animated series, broadcast on CBS |
| Bob Hastings | The Batman/Superman Hour | 1968–1969 | Animated series, broadcast on CBS |
| Lennie Weinrib | The Brady Kids - "Cindy's Super Friend" | 1972 | Animated series |
| Danny Dark | Super Friends | 1973 | Animated series, Super Friends franchise |
| Danny Dark | The All-New Super Friends Hour | 1977–1978 | Animated series, Super Friends franchise |
| Danny Dark | Challenge of the Superfriends | 1978 | Animated series, Super Friends franchise |
| Danny Dark | The World's Greatest SuperFriends | 1979–1980 | Animated series, Super Friends franchise |
| Danny Dark | Super Friends | 1980–1983 | Animated series, Super Friends franchise |
| Danny Dark | Super Friends: The Legendary Super Powers Show | 1984–1985 | Animated series, Super Friends franchise |
| Danny Dark | The Super Powers Team: Galactic Guardians | 1985 | Animated series, Super Friends franchise |
| Bill Murray | Saturday Night Live - "Margot Kidder/The Chieftains" | 1979 | Broadcast on NBC |
| Beau Weaver | Superman | 1988 | Animated series, broadcast on CBS |
| John Haymes Newton | Superboy | 1988–1989 | Syndicated series |
| Gerard Christopher | Superboy | 1989–1992 | Syndicated series |
| Ron Ely | Superboy - "The Road to Hell" | 1991 | Syndicated series |
| Dean Cain | Lois & Clark: The New Adventures of Superman | 1993–1997 | ABC series |
| Tim Daly | Superman: The Animated Series | 1996–2000 | Animated series, DC Animated Universe |
| Tim Thomerson | Lois & Clark: The New Adventures of Superman - "I've Got You Under My Skin" | 1997 | ABC series |
| Dwayne Johnson | Saturday Night Live - "The Rock/AC/DC" | 2000 | Broadcast on NBC |
| Christopher McDonald | Batman Beyond - "The Call" | 2000 | Animated series, DC Animated Universe |
| George Newbern | Justice League | 2001–2004 | Animated series, DC Animated Universe |
| George Newbern | Static Shock - "Toys in the Hood" | 2003 | Animated series, DC Animated Universe |
| George Newbern | Justice League Unlimited | 2004–2006 | Animated series, DC Animated Universe |
| George Newbern | The Batman | 2006–2008 | Animated series |
| Tom Welling | Smallville | 2001–2011 | Broadcast on The WB/The CW |
| Tom Welling | Batwoman - "Crisis on Infinite Earths: Part Two" | 2019 | Broadcast on The CW, Arrowverse |
| Hugh Jackman | Saturday Night Live - "Hugh Jackman/Mick Jagger" | 2001 | Broadcast on NBC |
| Shane Haboucha | Justice League Unlimited - "Kid Stuff" | 2004 | Animated series, DC Animated Universe |
| John Glover | Smallville - "Transference" | 2004 | Broadcast on The WB |
| Michael Daingerfield | Krypto the Superdog - "Krypto's Scrypto" | 2005 | Animated series, broadcast on Cartoon Network |
| Yuri Lowenthal | Legion of Super Heroes | 2006–2008 | Animated series |
| Nolan North | Young Justice | 2010–2022 | Animated series |
| Roger Rose | Batman: The Brave and the Bold - "Battle of the Superheroes!" and "Triumvirate of Terror!" | 2011 | Animated series, broadcast on Cartoon Network |
| Jason J. Lewis | Justice League Action | 2016–2018 | Animated series, broadcast on Cartoon Network |
| Tyler Hoechlin | Supergirl | 2016–2019 | Broadcast on The CW, Arrowverse |
| Tyler Hoechlin | The Flash - "Elseworlds: Part One" and "Crisis on Infinite Earths: Part Three" | 2018–2019 | Broadcast on The CW, Arrowverse |
| Tyler Hoechlin | Arrow - "Elseworlds: Part Two" and "Crisis on Infinite Earths: Part Four" | 2018–2020 | Broadcast on The CW, Arrowverse |
| Tyler Hoechlin | Batwoman - "Crisis on Infinite Earths: Part Two" | 2019 | Broadcast on The CW, Arrowverse |
| Tyler Hoechlin | Legends of Tomorrow - "Crisis on Infinite Earths: Part Five" | 2020 | Broadcast on The CW, Arrowverse |
| Tyler Hoechlin | Superman & Lois | 2021–2024 | Broadcast on The CW, Arrowverse |
| Brandon Routh | Batwoman - "Crisis on Infinite Earths: Part Two" | 2019–2020 | Broadcast on the CW, Arrowverse |
| Brandon Routh | The Flash - "Crisis on Infinite Earths: Part Three" | 2019–2020 | Broadcast on the CW, Arrowverse |
| Brandon Routh | Legends of Tomorrow - "Crisis on Infinite Earths: Part Five" | 2019–2020 | Broadcast on the CW, Arrowverse |
| James Wolk | Harley Quinn | 2019–present | Animated series |
| Jack Quaid | My Adventures with Superman | 2023–present | Animated series, broadcast on Adult Swim |
| David Kaye | Teen Titans Go! - "Four Hundred" | 2024 | Animated series |

== Theatrical films ==
| Name | Title | Date | Type |
|---|---|---|---|
| Bud Collyer | Superman | 1941 | Animated short (Fleischer Studios) |
| Bud Collyer | The Mechanical Monsters | 1941 | Animated short (Fleischer Studios) |
| Bud Collyer | Billion Dollar Limited | 1942 | Animated short (Fleischer Studios) |
| Bud Collyer | The Arctic Giant | 1942 | Animated short (Fleischer Studios) |
| Bud Collyer | The Bulleteers | 1942 | Animated short (Fleischer Studios) |
| Bud Collyer | The Magnetic Telescope | 1942 | Animated short (Fleischer Studios) |
| Bud Collyer | Electric Earthquake | 1942 | Animated short (Fleischer Studios) |
| Bud Collyer | Volcano | 1942 | Animated short (Fleischer Studios) |
| Bud Collyer | Terror on the Midway | 1942 | Animated short (Fleischer Studios) |
| Bud Collyer | Japoteurs | 1942 | Animated shorts (Famous Studios) |
| Bud Collyer | Showdown | 1942 | Animated shorts (Famous Studios) |
| Bud Collyer | Eleventh Hour | 1942 | Animated shorts (Famous Studios) |
| Bud Collyer | Destruction, Inc. | 1942 | Animated shorts (Famous Studios) |
| Bud Collyer | The Mummy Strikes | 1943 | Animated shorts (Famous Studios) |
| Bud Collyer | Jungle Drums | 1943 | Animated shorts (Famous Studios) |
| Bud Collyer | The Underground World | 1943 | Animated shorts (Famous Studios) |
| Bud Collyer | Secret Agent | 1943 | Animated shorts (Famous Studios) |
| Kirk Alyn | Superman | 1948 | Film serial |
| Kirk Alyn | Atom Man vs. Superman | 1950 | Film serial |
| George Reeves | Superman and the Mole Men | 1951 | |
| Christopher Reeve | Superman | 1978 | Original Superman film series (1978–2006) |
| Christopher Reeve | Superman II | 1980 | Original Superman film series (1978–2006) |
| Christopher Reeve | Superman III | 1983 | Original Superman film series (1978–2006) |
| Christopher Reeve | Superman IV: The Quest for Peace | 1987 | Original Superman film series (1978–2006) |
| Jeff East | Superman | 1978 | Younger version, Original Superman film series (1978–2006) |
| Brandon Routh | Superman Returns | 2006 | Original Superman film series (1978–2006) |
| Henry Cavill | Man of Steel | 2013 | DC Extended Universe |
| Henry Cavill | Batman v Superman: Dawn of Justice | 2016 | DC Extended Universe |
| Henry Cavill | Justice League | 2017 | DC Extended Universe |
| Henry Cavill | Black Adam | 2022 | DC Extended Universe |
| Henry Cavill | The Flash | 2023 | DC Extended Universe |
| Cooper Timberline | Man of Steel | 2013 | DC Extended Universe, 9-year-old version |
| Dylan Sprayberry | Man of Steel | 2013 | DC Extended Universe, 13-year-old version |
| Channing Tatum | The Lego Movie | 2014 | Animated feature film |
| Channing Tatum | The Lego Batman Movie | 2017 | Animated feature film |
| Channing Tatum | The Lego Movie 2: The Second Part | 2019 | Animated feature film |
| Nicolas Cage | Teen Titans Go! To the Movies | 2018 | Animated feature film |
| Nicolas Cage | The Flash | 2023 | DC Extended Universe |
| John Krasinski | DC League of Super-Pets | 2022 | Animated feature film |
| David Corenswet | Superman | 2025 | DC Universe |

== Video games ==
| Name | Title | Date | Type |
|---|---|---|---|
| Barton Tinapp | The Multipath Adventures of Superman: Menace of Metallo | 1999 | |
| Tim Daly | Superman: Shadow of Apokolips | 2002 | |
| Jeff Kramer | Superman: The Man of Steel | 2002 | |
| Crispin Freeman | Justice League Heroes | 2006 | |
| Brandon Routh | Superman Returns | 2006 | |
| Christopher Corey Smith | Mortal Kombat vs. DC Universe | 2008 | |
| Adam Baldwin | DC Universe Online | 2011 | |
| Troy Baker | Infinite Crisis | 2011 | |
| JB Blanc | Infinite Crisis | 2011 | |
| Travis Willingham | Lego Batman 2: DC Super Heroes | 2012 | |
| Travis Willingham | Lego Batman 3: Beyond Gotham | 2014 | |
| Travis Willingham | Infinite Crisis | 2015 | |
| Travis Willingham | Lego Dimensions | 2015 | |
| Travis Willingham | Lego DC Super-Villains | 2019 | |
| Nolan North | Young Justice: Legacy | 2013 | |
| Nolan North | Justice League: Cosmic Chaos | 2023 | |
| George Newbern | Injustice: Gods Among Us | 2013 | |
| George Newbern | DC Universe Online | 2016 | |
| George Newbern | Injustice 2 | 2017 | |
| George Newbern | MultiVersus | 2022 | |
| P.M. Seymour | DC Battle Arena | 2021 | |
| Craig Lee Thomas | DC: Dark Legion | 2025 | |

== Web originals and motion comics ==
| Name | Title | Date | Type |
|---|---|---|---|
| Patrick Warburton | The Adventures of Seinfeld & Superman | 2004 | Web series |
| David Lodge | Superman: Red Son | 2009 | Motion comic |
| Joseph May | Batman: Black & White | 2009 | Motion comic |
| Benjamin Bratt | Justice League: Gods and Monsters Chronicles | 2015 | Animated web series |
| Max Mittelman | DC Super Hero Girls: Super Shorts - "#EqualTights" | 2019 | Animated short |
| Tim Daly | The Creative Coalition Presents: Superman Radio Show | 2020 | All-star reading of the original radio scripts |
| Wilson Cruz | The Creative Coalition Presents: Superman Radio Show | 2020 | All-star reading of the original radio scripts |
| Daniel Dae Kim | The Creative Coalition Presents: Superman Radio Show | 2020 | All-star reading of the original radio scripts |
| David Hasselhoff | Dark Nights: Death Metal - Sonic Metalverse | 2020–2021 | Motion comic |

== See also ==
- Superman (franchise)
- List of actors who have played Batman
- List of actors who have played Wonder Woman
