= List of actors who have played Wonder Woman =

The following is a list of actors (Note: The gender-neutral term actors is used in this article as this list also includes non-binary actors, namely Emily Carey and Halsey.) who have played Wonder Woman in various media. It primarily features portrayals of Diana Prince, but also includes performances of other characters who have assumed the Wonder Woman mantle.

== Radio and audio dramas ==
Name	Title	Date	Type
Lorelei King	Kingdom Come	2025	Audio drama

== Television and DTV films ==
Name	Title	Date	Type
Cathy Lee Crosby	Wonder Woman	1974	Television film
Lynda Carter	The New Original Wonder Woman	1975	Television pilot
Lucy Lawless	Justice League: The New Frontier	2008	Animated direct-to-video film
Keri Russell	Wonder Woman	2009	Animated direct-to-video film
Vanessa Marshall	Justice League: Crisis on Two Earths	2010	Animated direct-to-video film
Vanessa Marshall	Justice League: The Flashpoint Paradox	2013	Animated direct-to-video film
Vanessa Marshall	Superman: Red Son	2020	Animated direct-to-video film
Susan Eisenberg	Superman/Batman: Apocalypse	2010	Animated direct-to-video film
Susan Eisenberg	Justice League: Doom	2012	Animated direct-to-video film
Susan Eisenberg	Justice League vs. the Fatal Five	2019	Animated direct-to-video film, DC Animated Universe
Adrianne Palicki	Wonder Woman	2011	Unaired television pilot
Alex Borstein	Robot Chicken DC Comics Special	2012	Stop-motion/animated television special
Alex Borstein	Robot Chicken DC Comics Special 2: Villains in Paradise	2014	Stop-motion/animated television special
Alex Borstein	Robot Chicken DC Comics Special III: Magical Friendship	2015	Stop-motion/animated television special
Laura Bailey	Lego Batman: The Movie – DC Super Heroes Unite	2013	Animated direct-to-video film
Laura Bailey	Justice League x RWBY: Super Heroes & Huntsmen - Part Two	2023	Animated direct-to-video film
Grey DeLisle	JLA Adventures: Trapped in Time	2014	Animated direct-to-video film
Grey DeLisle	Lego DC Comics: Batman Be-Leaguered	2014	Animated direct-to-video short film
Grey DeLisle	Lego DC Comics Super Heroes: Justice League – Attack of the Legion of Doom	2015	Animated direct-to-video film
Grey DeLisle	Lego DC Comics Super Heroes: Justice League – Cosmic Clash	2016	Animated direct-to-video film
Grey DeLisle	Lego DC Comics Super Heroes: Justice League – Gotham City Breakout	2016	Animated direct-to-video film
Grey DeLisle	Lego DC Super Hero Girls: Brain Drain	2017	Animated direct-to-video film
Grey DeLisle	Lego DC Comics Super Heroes: The Flash	2018	Animated direct-to-video film
Grey DeLisle	Lego DC Super Hero Girls: Super-Villain High	2018	Animated direct-to-video film
Grey DeLisle	Lego DC Comics Super Heroes: Aquaman – Rage of Atlantis	2018	Animated direct-to-video film
Grey DeLisle	Lego DC Shazam! Magic and Monsters	2020	Animated direct-to-video film
Grey DeLisle	Teen Titans Go! & DC Super Hero Girls: Mayhem in the Multiverse	2022	Animated direct-to-video film
Grey DeLisle	Scooby-Doo! and Krypto, Too!	2023	Animated direct-to-video film
Michelle Monaghan	Justice League: War	2014	Animated direct-to-video film, DC Animated Movie Universe
Kari Wahlgren	Lego DC Comics Super Heroes: Justice League vs. Bizarro League	2015	Animated direct-to-video film
Tamara Taylor (Note: as Bekka)	Justice League: Gods and Monsters	2015	Animated direct-to-video film
Rosario Dawson	Justice League: Throne of Atlantis	2015	Animated direct-to-video film, DC Animated Movie Universe
Rosario Dawson	Justice League vs. Teen Titans	2016	Animated direct-to-video film, DC Animated Movie Universe
Rosario Dawson	Justice League Dark	2017	Animated direct-to-video film, DC Animated Movie Universe
Rosario Dawson	The Death of Superman	2018	Animated direct-to-video film, DC Animated Movie Universe
Rosario Dawson	Reign of the Supermen	2019	Animated direct-to-video film, DC Animated Movie Universe
Rosario Dawson	Wonder Woman: Bloodlines	2019	Animated direct-to-video film, DC Animated Movie Universe
Rosario Dawson	Justice League Dark: Apokolips War	2020	Animated direct-to-video film, DC Animated Movie Universe
Janet Varney	Injustice	2021	Animated direct-to-video film
Stana Katic	Justice Society: World War II	2021	Animated direct-to-video film, Tomorrowverse
Stana Katic	Justice League: Warworld	2023	Animated direct-to-video film, Tomorrowverse
Stana Katic	Justice League: Crisis on Infinite Earths	2024	Animated direct-to-video film, Tomorrowverse
Natalie Alyn Lind	Justice League x RWBY: Super Heroes & Huntsmen - Part One	2023	Animated direct-to-video film
Jamie Gray Hyder	Justice League: Crisis on Infinite Earths	2024	Animated direct-to-video film
Molly Searcy	Batman Ninja vs. Yakuza League	2025	Anime film, English dub

== Television series ==
Name	Title	Date	Type
Jane Webb	The Brady Kids - "It's All Greek to Me"	1972	Animated series, broadcast on ABC
Shannon Farnon	Super Friends	1973	Animated series, Super Friends franchise
Shannon Farnon	The All-New Super Friends Hour	1977–1978	Animated series, Super Friends franchise
Shannon Farnon	Challenge of the Superfriends	1978	Animated series, Super Friends franchise
Shannon Farnon	The World's Greatest SuperFriends	1979–1980	Animated series, Super Friends franchise
Shannon Farnon	Super Friends	1980–1983	Animated series, Super Friends franchise
Lynda Carter	Wonder Woman	1976–1977	Live action series, broadcast on ABC
Lynda Carter	The New Adventures of Wonder Woman	1977–1979	Live action series, broadcast on CBS
Connie Cawlfield	Super Friends: The Legendary Super Powers Show	1984–1985	Animated series, Super Friends franchise
B. J. Ward	The Super Powers Team: Galactic Guardians	1985	Animated series, Super Friends franchise
Mary McDonald-Lewis	Superman - "Superman and Wonder Woman vs. The Sorceress of Time"	1988	Animated series, broadcast on CBS
Susan Eisenberg	Justice League	2001–2004	Animated series, DC Animated Universe
Susan Eisenberg	Justice League Unlimited	2004–2006	Animated series, DC Animated Universe
Dakota Fanning	Justice League Unlimited - "Kid Stuff"	2004	Animated series, DC Animated Universe
Vicki Lewis	Batman: The Brave and the Bold - "The Scorn of the Star Sapphire!" and "Triumvirate of Terror!"	2011	Animated series
Maggie Q	Young Justice	2012–2019	Animated series
Rachel Kimsey	Justice League Action	2016–2018	Animated series
Rachel Kimsey	Scooby-Doo and Guess Who? - "The Scooby of a Thousand Faces!"	2019	Animated series
Grey DeLisle	DC Super Hero Girls	2019–2021	Animated series
Grey DeLisle	Teen Titans Go! - "Superhero Feud" and "Space House"	2020–2021	Animated series
Vanessa Marshall	Harley Quinn	2019–present	Animated series
Lilly Aspell	DC Super Hero Girls - "#AwesomeAuntAntiope"	2020	Animated series

== Theatrical films ==
Name	Title	Date	Type
Cobie Smulders	The Lego Movie	2014	Animated film
Cobie Smulders	The Lego Movie 2: The Second Part	2019	Animated film
Gal Gadot	Batman v Superman: Dawn of Justice	2016	DC Extended Universe
Gal Gadot	Wonder Woman	2017	DC Extended Universe
Gal Gadot	Justice League	2017	DC Extended Universe
Gal Gadot	Wonder Woman 1984	2020	DC Extended Universe
Gal Gadot	Shazam! Fury of the Gods	2023	DC Extended Universe
Gal Gadot	The Flash	2023	DC Extended Universe
Lilly Aspell	Wonder Woman	2017	DC Extended Universe
Lilly Aspell	Wonder Woman 1984	2020	DC Extended Universe
Emily Carey	Wonder Woman	2017	DC Extended Universe
Halsey	Teen Titans Go! To the Movies	2018	Animated film
Rosario Dawson	Space Jam: A New Legacy	2021	
Jameela Jamil	DC League of Super-Pets	2022	Animated film
Romi Park	Batman Ninja vs. Yakuza League	2025	Anime film, Japanese release

== Video games ==
Name	Title	Date	Type
Courtenay Taylor	Justice League Heroes	2006	
Courtenay Taylor	DC: Dark Legion	2025	
Tara Platt	Mortal Kombat vs. DC Universe	2008	
Gina Torres	DC Universe Online	2011	
Laura Bailey	Lego Batman 2: DC Super Heroes	2012	
Laura Bailey	Lego Batman 3: Beyond Gotham	2014	
Laura Bailey	Infinite Crisis	2015	
Laura Bailey	Lego Dimensions	2015	
Susan Eisenberg	Injustice: Gods Among Us	2013	
Susan Eisenberg	DC Universe Online	2013	
Susan Eisenberg	Injustice 2	2017	
Susan Eisenberg	Lego DC Super-Villains	2018	
Vanessa Marshall	Infinite Crisis	2015	
Vanessa Marshall	Justice League: Cosmic Chaos	2023	
Jen Taylor	Infinite Crisis	2015	
Grey DeLisle	DC Super Hero Girls: Teen Power	2021	
Abby Trott	MultiVersus	2022	
Zehra Fazal	Suicide Squad: Kill the Justice League	2024	

== Web originals and motion comics ==
Name	Title	Date	Type
Wendee Lee	Superman: Red Son	2009	Motion comic
Tamara Taylor (Note: as Bekka)	Justice League: Gods and Monsters Chronicles - "Big"	2015	Animated web series
Grey DeLisle	DC Super Hero Girls	2015–2018	Animated web series
Chelsea Wolfe	Dark Nights: Death Metal - Sonic Metalverse	2020–2021	Motion comic

== See also ==
- Wonder Woman (franchise)
- List of actors who have played Superman
- List of actors who have played Batman
