= List of actors who have played Batman =

The following is a list of actors who have played Batman in various media. It primarily features portrayals of Bruce Wayne, but also includes performances of other characters who have assumed the Batman mantle such as Terry McGinnis.

== Radio and audio dramas ==
Name	Title	Date	Type
Matt Crowley	The Adventures of Superman	1945–1948	Radio series (Mutual)
Stacy Harris	The Adventures of Superman	1945–1948	Radio series (Mutual)
Gary Merrill	The Adventures of Superman	1945–1948	Radio series (Mutual)
Richard Devon	The Batman Mystery Club	1950	Radio pilot
Bob Sessions	Superman On Trial	1988	BBC Radio
Bob Sessions	Batman: The Lazarus Syndrome	1989	BBC Radio
Bob Sessions	Batman: Knightfall	1994	BBC Radio
Jeffrey Wright	Batman: The Audio Adventures	2021–2022	Scripted podcast
Winston Duke	Batman Unburied	2022	Scripted podcast
Rocco Pitanga	Batman Unburied	2022	Scripted podcast (Brazilian release)
Alfonso Herrera	Batman Unburied	2022	Scripted podcast (Mexican release)
Dali Benssalah	Batman Unburied	2022	Scripted podcast (French release)
Murathan Muslu	Batman Unburied	2022	Scripted podcast (German release)
Amit Sadh	Batman Unburied	2022	Scripted podcast (Indian release)
Ario Bayu	Batman Unburied	2022	Scripted podcast (Indonesian release)
Claudio Santamaria	Batman Unburied	2022	Scripted podcast (Italian release)
Ryohei Otani	Batman Unburied	2022	Scripted podcast (Japanese release)
Justin Hartley	Harley Quinn and The Joker: Sound Mind	2023	Scripted podcast
Colman Domingo	The Riddler: Secrets in the Dark	2023	Scripted podcast
Colman Domingo	Batman Unburied - Fallen City	2024	Scripted podcast
Jason Spisak	DC High Volume: Batman	2025–	Scripted podcast
Glenn Wrage	Kingdom Come	2025	Audio drama

== Stage plays ==
Name	Title	Date	Type and location
Nick Court	Batman Live	2011	UK arena tour
Sam Heughan	Batman Live	2011	UK arena tour
Joe Walker	Holy Musical B@man!	2012	StarKid musical parody

== Television and DTV films ==
Name	Title	Date	Type
Adam West	Legends of the Superheroes	1979	Two-part television special (NBC)
Kevin Conroy	The Batman/Superman Movie: World's Finest	1997	Animated television compilation film, DC Animated Universe
Kevin Conroy	Batman & Mr. Freeze: SubZero	1998	Animated direct-to-video film, DC Animated Universe
Kevin Conroy	Batman Beyond: Return of the Joker	2000	Animated direct-to-video film, DC Animated Universe
Kevin Conroy	Batman: Mystery of the Batwoman	2003	Animated direct-to-video film, DC Animated Universe
Kevin Conroy	Batman: Gotham Knight	2008	Animated direct-to-video film, set in the continuity of the Dark Knight trilogy
Kevin Conroy	Superman/Batman: Public Enemies	2009	Animated direct-to-video film
Kevin Conroy	Superman/Batman: Apocalypse	2010	Animated direct-to-video film
Kevin Conroy	Justice League: Doom	2012	Animated direct-to-video film
Kevin Conroy	Justice League: The Flashpoint Paradox	2013	Animated direct-to-video film
Kevin Conroy	Batman: Assault on Arkham	2014	Animated direct-to-video film, set in the continuity of the Batman: Arkham game series
Kevin Conroy	Batman and Harley Quinn	2017	Animated direct-to-video film, DC Animated Universe
Kevin Conroy	Justice League vs. the Fatal Five	2019	Animated direct-to-video film, DC Animated Universe
Kevin Conroy	Justice League: Crisis on Infinite Earths – Part Three	2024	Animated direct-to-video film, posthumous release; dedicated in memory
Will Friedle	Batman Beyond: Return of the Joker	2000	Animated direct-to-video film, DC Animated Universe
Will Friedle	Justice League: Crisis on Infinite Earths	2024	Animated direct-to-video film
Rino Romano	The Batman vs. Dracula	2005	Animated direct-to-video film
Jeremy Sisto	Justice League: The New Frontier	2008	Animated direct-to-video film
William Baldwin	Justice League: Crisis on Two Earths	2010	Animated direct-to-video film
Bruce Greenwood	Batman: Under the Red Hood	2010	Animated direct-to-video film
Bruce Greenwood	Batman: Gotham by Gaslight	2018	Animated direct-to-video film
Bruce Greenwood	Batman: Death in the Family	2020	Animated direct-to-video film
Seth Green	Robot Chicken DC Comics Special	2012	Stop-motion/animated television special
Seth Green	Robot Chicken DC Comics Special 2: Villains in Paradise	2014	Stop-motion/animated television special
Seth Green	Robot Chicken DC Comics Special III: Magical Friendship	2015	Stop-motion/animated television special
Peter Weller	Batman: The Dark Knight Returns	2012/2013	2-part animated direct-to-video film
Troy Baker	Lego Batman: The Movie – DC Super Heroes Unite	2013	Animated direct-to-video film
Troy Baker	Lego DC Comics Super Heroes: Justice League vs. Bizarro League	2015	Animated direct-to-video film
Troy Baker	Lego DC Comics: Batman Be-Leaguered	2015	Animated direct-to-video short film
Troy Baker	Lego DC Comics Super Heroes: Justice League – Attack of the Legion of Doom	2015	Animated direct-to-video film
Troy Baker	Lego DC Comics Super Heroes: Justice League – Cosmic Clash	2016	Animated direct-to-video film
Troy Baker	Lego DC Comics Super Heroes: Justice League – Gotham City Breakout	2016	Animated direct-to-video film
Troy Baker	Lego DC Comics Super Heroes: The Flash	2018	Animated direct-to-video film
Troy Baker	Lego DC Comics Super Heroes: Aquaman – Rage of Atlantis	2018	Animated direct-to-video film
Troy Baker	Batman vs. Teenage Mutant Ninja Turtles	2019	Animated direct-to-video film
Troy Baker	Lego DC Batman: Family Matters	2019	Animated direct-to-video film
Troy Baker	Lego DC Shazam! Magic and Monsters	2020	Animated direct-to-video film
Troy Baker	Batman and Superman: Battle of the Super Sons	2022	Animated direct-to-video film
Troy Baker	Justice League x RWBY: Super Heroes & Huntsmen Part II	2023	Animated direct-to-video film
Kevin McKidd	Justice League: The Flashpoint Paradox	2013	Animated direct-to-video film
Diedrich Bader	JLA Adventures: Trapped in Time	2014	Animated direct-to-video film
Diedrich Bader	Scooby-Doo! & Batman: The Brave and the Bold	2018	Animated direct-to-video film
Jason O'Mara	Justice League: War	2014	Animated direct-to-video film
Jason O'Mara	Son of Batman	2014	Animated direct-to-video film
Jason O'Mara	Justice League: Throne of Atlantis	2015	Animated direct-to-video film
Jason O'Mara	Batman vs. Robin	2015	Animated direct-to-video film
Jason O'Mara	Batman: Bad Blood	2016	Animated direct-to-video film
Jason O'Mara	Justice League vs. Teen Titans	2016	Animated direct-to-video film
Jason O'Mara	Justice League Dark	2017	Animated direct-to-video film
Jason O'Mara	The Death of Superman	2018	Animated direct-to-video film
Jason O'Mara	Reign of the Supermen	2019	Animated direct-to-video film
Jason O'Mara	Batman: Hush	2019	Animated direct-to-video film
Jason O'Mara	Justice League Dark: Apokolips War	2020	Animated direct-to-video film
Roger Craig Smith	Batman Unlimited: Animal Instincts	2015	Animated direct-to-video film
Roger Craig Smith	Batman Unlimited: Monster Mayhem	2015	Animated direct-to-video film
Roger Craig Smith	Batman Unlimited: Mechs vs. Mutants	2016	Animated direct-to-video film
Roger Craig Smith	Batman Ninja	2018	Anime film, direct-to-video English dub
Roger Craig Smith	Superman: Red Son	2020	Animated direct-to-video film
Michael C. Hall	Justice League: Gods and Monsters	2015	Animated direct-to-video film
Sean Maher	Batman: Bad Blood	2016	Animated direct-to-video film
David Giuntoli	Batman: Soul of the Dragon	2021	Animated direct-to-video film
David Giuntoli	Batman: The Doom That Came to Gotham	2021	Animated direct-to-video film
Ben Affleck	Zack Snyder's Justice League	2021	HBO Max release, director's cut of Justice League (2017)
Jensen Ackles	Batman: The Long Halloween	2021	Animated direct-to-video film
Jensen Ackles	Legion of Super-Heroes	2023	Animated direct-to-video film
Jensen Ackles	Justice League: Warworld	2023	Animated direct-to-video film
Jensen Ackles	Justice League: Crisis on Infinite Earths	2024	Animated direct-to-video film
Anson Mount	Injustice	2021	Animated direct-to-video film
Anson Mount	Batman: Knightfall – Part 1: Knightfall	2026	Animated direct-to-video film
Keith Ferguson	Teen Titans Go! & DC Super Hero Girls: Mayhem in the Multiverse	2022	Animated direct-to-video film
Nat Wolff	Justice League x RWBY: Super Heroes & Huntsmen Part I	2023	Animated direct-to-video film
Luke Wilson	Merry Little Batman	2023	Animated streaming film
Joe Daniels	Batman Ninja vs. Yakuza League	2025	Anime film, direct-to-video English dub

== Television series ==
Name	Title	Date	Type
Adam West	Batman	1966–1968	ABC series
Adam West	Super Friends: The Legendary Super Powers Show	1984–1985	Animated series, Super Friends franchise
Adam West	The Super Powers Team: Galactic Guardians	1985	Animated series, Super Friends franchise
Olan Soule	The Batman/Superman Hour	1968–1969	Animated series, broadcast on CBS
Olan Soule	The New Scooby-Doo Movies - "The Dynamic Scooby-Doo Affair" and "The Caped Crusader Caper"	1972	Animated series, broadcast on CBS
Olan Soule	Super Friends	1973	Animated series, Super Friends franchise
Olan Soule	The All-New Super Friends Hour	1977–1978	Animated series, Super Friends franchise
Olan Soule	Challenge of the Superfriends	1978	Animated series, Super Friends franchise
Olan Soule	The World's Greatest SuperFriends	1979–1980	Animated series, Super Friends franchise
Olan Soule	Super Friends	1980–1983	Animated series, Super Friends franchise
Kevin Conroy	Batman: The Animated Series	1992–1995	Animated series, DC Animated Universe
Kevin Conroy	The New Batman Adventures	1997–1999	Animated series, DC Animated Universe
Kevin Conroy	Superman: The Animated Series	1997–1999	Animated series, DC Animated Universe
Kevin Conroy	Batman Beyond	1999–2001	Animated series, DC Animated Universe
Kevin Conroy	The Zeta Project - "Shadows"	2001	Animated series, DC Animated Universe
Kevin Conroy	Justice League	2001–2004	Animated series, DC Animated Universe
Kevin Conroy	Static Shock	2002–2004	Animated series, DC Animated Universe
Kevin Conroy	Justice League Unlimited	2004–2006	Animated series, DC Animated Universe
Kevin Conroy	Batman: The Brave and the Bold - "The Super-Batman of Planet X!"	2010	Animated series
Kevin Conroy	Justice League Action	2016–2018	Animated series
Kevin Conroy	Teen Titans Go! - "Real Orangins"	2018	Animated series
Kevin Conroy	Scooby-Doo and Guess Who? - "What a Night, For a Dark Knight!"	2019	Animated series
Kevin Conroy	Batwoman - "Crisis on Infinite Earths: Part Two"	2019	Arrowverse, broadcast on the CW
Gary Owens	The New Batman Adventures - "Legends of the Dark Knight"	1998	Animated series, DC Animated Universe
Michael Ironside	The New Batman Adventures - "Legends of the Dark Knight"	1998	Animated series, DC Animated Universe
Will Friedle	Batman Beyond	1999–2001	Animated series, DC Animated Universe
Will Friedle	The Zeta Project - "Shadows"	2001	Animated series, DC Animated Universe
Will Friedle	Static Shock - "Future Shock"	2004	Animated series, DC Animated Universe
Will Friedle	Justice League Unlimited - "The Once and Future Thing, Part Two: Time, Warped" and "Epilogue"	2005	Animated series, DC Animated Universe
Alex Daniels	Birds of Prey - "Pilot"	2002	Broadcast on the WB
Kyle Alcazar	Justice League Unlimited - "Kid Stuff"	2004	Animated series, DC Animated Universe
Rino Romano	The Batman	2004–2008	Animated series
Bruce Greenwood	Young Justice	2010–2019	Animated series
Diedrich Bader	Batman: The Brave and the Bold	2008–2011	Animated series
Diedrich Bader	Harley Quinn	2019–present	Animated series
Corey Burton	Batman: The Brave and the Bold - "Bat-Mite Presents: Batman's Strangest Cases!"	2011	Animated series
Frank Welker	Batman: The Brave and the Bold - "Bat-Mite Presents: Batman's Strangest Cases!"	2011	Animated series
Anthony Ruivivar	Beware the Batman	2013	Animated series, broadcast on Cartoon Network
David Mazouz	Gotham	2014–2019	Broadcast on Fox
Alain Moussi	Titans - "Dick Grayson"	2018	Aired on DC Universe
Mikhail Mudrik	Gotham - "The Beginning..."	2019	Broadcast on Fox
Iain Glen	Titans	2019–2021	Aired on DC Universe and HBO Max
Warren Christie	Batwoman - "Armed and Dangerous"	2021	Arrowverse, broadcast on The CW
Jack Stanton	Harley Quinn - "Batman Begins Forever"	2022	Animated series, broadcast on Max
Ethan Hawke	Batwheels	2022–present	Animated series, broadcast on Cartoon Network
David Miller	Gotham Knights - "Pilot"	2023	Broadcast on The CW
Hamish Linklater	Batman: Caped Crusader	2024–present	Animated series, released on Amazon Prime Video

== Theatrical films ==
Name	Title	Date	Type
Lewis Wilson	Batman	1943	Film serial
Robert Lowery	Batman and Robin	1949	Film serial
Adam West	Batman	1966	Spin-off to the 1960s television series
Adam West	Batman: Return of the Caped Crusaders	2016	Animated film, spin-off to the 1960s television series, premiered at New York Comic-Con with a limited theatrical release
Adam West	Batman vs. Two-Face	2017	Animated film, spin-off to the 1960s television series, premiered at New York Comic-Con
Michael Keaton	Batman	1989	Original Batman film series (1989–1997)
Michael Keaton	Batman Returns	1992	Original Batman film series (1989–1997)
Michael Keaton	The Flash	2023	DC Extended Universe
Michael Keaton	Batgirl	N/A	Unreleased, DC Extended Universe
Charles Roskilly	Batman	1989	Original Batman film series (1989–1997)
Kevin Conroy	Batman: Mask of the Phantasm	1993	Animated feature film, DC Animated Universe
Kevin Conroy	Batman: The Killing Joke	2016	Animated feature film, limited theatrical release
Val Kilmer	Batman Forever	1995	Original Batman film series (1989–1997)
George Clooney	Batman & Robin	1997	Original Batman film series (1989–1997)
George Clooney	The Flash	2023	DC Extended Universe
Eric Lloyd	Batman & Robin	1997	Original Batman film series (1989–1997)
Christian Bale	Batman Begins	2005	Dark Knight trilogy
Christian Bale	The Dark Knight	2008	Dark Knight trilogy
Christian Bale	The Dark Knight Rises	2012	Dark Knight trilogy
Gus Lewis	Batman Begins	2005	Dark Knight trilogy
Ben Affleck	Batman v Superman: Dawn of Justice	2016	DC Extended Universe
Ben Affleck	Suicide Squad	2016	DC Extended Universe
Ben Affleck	Justice League	2017	DC Extended Universe
Ben Affleck	The Flash	2023	DC Extended Universe
Brandon Spink	Batman v Superman: Dawn of Justice	2016	DC Extended Universe
Will Arnett	The Lego Movie	2014	Animated feature film
Will Arnett	The Lego Batman Movie	2017	Animated feature film
Will Arnett	The Lego Movie 2: The Second Part	2019	Animated feature film
Koichi Yamadera	Batman Ninja	2018	Anime film, Japanese theatrical release
Koichi Yamadera	Batman Ninja vs. Yakuza League	2025	Anime film, Japanese release
Jimmy Kimmel	Teen Titans Go! To the Movies	2019	Animated feature film
Dante Pereira-Olson	Joker	2019	
Robert Pattinson	The Batman	2022	
Keanu Reeves	DC League of Super-Pets	2022	Animated feature film

== Video games ==
Name	Title	Date	Type
Kevin Conroy	The Adventures of Batman & Robin	1994	DC Animated Universe
Kevin Conroy	Batman: Vengeance	2001	DC Animated Universe
Kevin Conroy	Batman: Rise of Sin Tzu	2003	DC Animated Universe
Kevin Conroy	Batman: Arkham Asylum	2009	Batman: Arkham series
Kevin Conroy	DC Universe Online	2011	
Kevin Conroy	Batman: Arkham City	2011	Batman: Arkham series
Kevin Conroy	Batman: Arkham City Lockdown	2011	Batman: Arkham series
Kevin Conroy	Injustice: Gods Among Us	2013	Injustice series
Kevin Conroy	Infinite Crisis	2015	
Kevin Conroy	Batman: Arkham Knight	2015	Batman: Arkham series
Kevin Conroy	Batman: Arkham Underworld	2016	Batman: Arkham series
Kevin Conroy	View-Master Batman Animated VR	2016	
Kevin Conroy	Batman: Arkham VR	2016	Batman: Arkham series
Kevin Conroy	Injustice 2	2017	Injustice series
Kevin Conroy	Lego DC Super-Villains	2018	Lego video game series
Kevin Conroy	MultiVersus	2022	
Kevin Conroy	Suicide Squad: Kill the Justice League	2024	Batman: Arkham series, posthumous release
Julian Fletcher	Batman: Dark Tomorrow	2003	
Rino Romano	The Batman: Multiply, Divide, and Conquer	2004	
Rino Romano	The Batman: Gotham City Rescue	2005	
Christian Bale	Batman Begins	2005	
Ron Perlman	Justice League Heroes	2006	
Dave Gazzana	Mortal Kombat vs. DC Universe	2008	
Diedrich Bader	Batman: The Brave and the Bold – The Videogame	2010	
Diedrich Bader	Justice League: Cosmic Chaos	2023	
Troy Baker	Lego Batman 2: DC Super Heroes	2012	Lego video game series
Troy Baker	Lego Batman 3: Beyond Gotham	2014	Lego video game series
Troy Baker	Lego Dimensions	2015	Lego video game series
Troy Baker	Batman: The Telltale Series	2016	Telltale Batman series
Troy Baker	Batman: The Enemy Within	2017	Telltale Batman series
Roger Craig Smith	Batman: Arkham Origins	2013	Batman: Arkham series
Roger Craig Smith	Batman: Arkham Origins Blackgate	2013	Batman: Arkham series
Roger Craig Smith	Batman: Arkham Shadow	2024	Batman: Arkham series
Roger Craig Smith	DC: Dark Legion	2025	
Robin Atkin Downes	Infinite Crisis	2015	
Steve Blum	Infinite Crisis	2015	
Christopher Escalante	DC Battle Arena	2021	
Michael Antonakos	Gotham Knights	2022	

== Web originals and motion comics ==
Name	Title	Date	Type
Kirk Thornton	Superman: Red Son	2009	Motion comic
Michael Dobson	Batman: Black & White	2009	Motion comic
Michael C. Hall	Justice League: Gods and Monsters Chronicles	2015	Animated web series
Andy Biersack	Dark Nights: Death Metal - Sonic Metalverse	2020–2021	Motion comic

== See also ==
- Batman (franchise)
- List of actors who have played Superman
- List of actors who have played Wonder Woman
