= Superman (franchise) =

Portrayals of Superman outside of comic books

Adaptations of Superman in other media
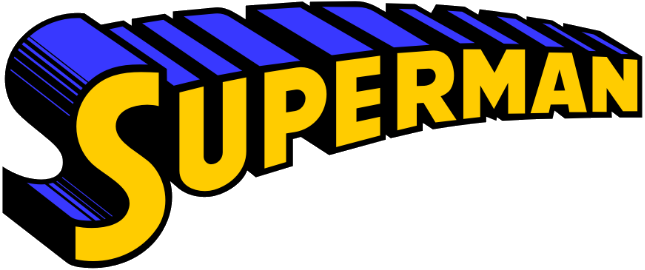
- Original source: Comics published by DC Comics
- First appearance: Action Comics #1 (April 1938)

Films and television
- Film(s): Superman (1948); Atom Man vs. Superman (1950); Superman and the Mole Men (1951); Superman (1978); Superman II (1980); Superman III (1983); Supergirl (1984); Superman IV: The Quest for Peace (1987); Superman Returns (2006); Superman II: The Richard Donner Cut (2006); Man of Steel (2013); Batman v Superman: Dawn of Justice (2016); Justice League (2017); Zack Snyder's Justice League (2021); Black Adam (2022); The Flash (2023); Superman (2025); Supergirl (2026)
- Television show(s): Adventures of Superman (1952–1958); Superboy (1988–1992); Lois & Clark: The New Adventures of Superman (1993–1997); Smallville (2001–2011); Supergirl (2016–2021); Krypton (2018–2019); Superman & Lois (2021–2024)

Theatrical presentations
- Musical(s): It's a Bird...It's a Plane...It's Superman (1966)

Audio presentations
- Radio show(s): The Adventures of Superman (1940); DC Comics Super Heroes – Attack of the Elementals (1995)

The character Superman, first appearing American comic books in 1938, has appeared in many types of media since the 1940s. Superman has appeared in radio, television, movies, and video games each on multiple occasions, and his name, symbol, and image have appeared on products and merchandise.

== Portrayals ==
Among the actors who have played Superman / Superboy (and/or his alter ego, Clark Kent) are:

=== Portrayed by ===
- Roy Middleton (1940)
  - 1939 New York World's Fair
- Mayo Kaan (circa 1940)
  - Fleischer Studios model for the original Superman short
- Karol Krauser (1941)
  - Fleischer Studios promotional model for the Superman shorts
- Kirk Alyn (1948–1950)
  - Superman
  - Atom Man vs. Superman
- George Reeves (1951–1958, 2023)
  - Superman and the Mole Men
  - Adventures of Superman
  - Stamp Day for Superman
  - The Flash (cameo, archive footage)
- Johnny Rockwell (1961)
  - The Adventures of Superboy
- Bob Holiday (1966–1968)
  - It's a Bird...It's a Plane...It's Superman (Broadway musical)
- David Wilson (1975)
  - It's a Bird...It's a Plane...It's Superman (TV special)
- Christopher Reeve (1978–1987, 2006, 2023)
  - Superman
  - Superman II
    - The Richard Donner Cut
  - Superman III
  - Superman IV: The Quest for Peace
  - The Flash (cameo, archive footage)
- John Haymes Newton (1988–1989)
  - Superboy
- Gerard Christopher (1989–1992)
  - Superboy
- Ron Ely (1991)
  - Superboy
- Dean Cain (1993–1997)
  - Lois & Clark: The New Adventures of Superman
- Tom Welling (2001–2011, 2019)
  - Smallville
  - Crisis on Infinite Earths
- Brandon Routh (2006, 2019/2020)
  - Superman Returns
  - Crisis on Infinite Earths
- Matt Bomer (2009)
  - Toyota Prius (commercial)
- Henry Cavill (2013–2023)
  - Man of Steel
  - Batman v Superman: Dawn of Justice
  - Justice League
    - Zack Snyder's Justice League
  - Black Adam (cameo)
  - The Flash (cameo) (Note: The actor's likeness was digitally recreated for a cameo appearance in The Flash using CGI. Cavill filmed additional scenes as the character for the film, but they were removed during post-production.)
- Tyler Hoechlin (2016–2024)
  - Supergirl
  - Elseworlds
  - Crisis on Infinite Earths
  - Superman & Lois
- Nicolas Cage (2023)
  - The Flash (cameo)
- David Corenswet (2025–present)
  - Superman
  - Supergirl
  - Man of Tomorrow

=== Voice only ===
- Bud Collyer (1940–49, 1966–69)
  - Superman (1940s cartoons)
  - The Adventures of Superman
  - The New Adventures of Superman
- Allen Swift (1965)
  - Soaky commercial
- Bob Hastings (1966–1969)
  - The New Adventures of Superman (in The Adventures of Superboy segments)
- Lennie Weinrib (1970, 1972)
  - Sesame Street
  - The Brady Kids
- Gary Owens (1971)
  - Kenner Talking Show Projector record
- Danny Dark (1973–1986)
  - Super Friends (1973)
  - The All-New Super Friends Hour
  - Challenge of the Superfriends
  - The World's Greatest Super Friends
  - Super Friends (1980)
  - Super Friends: The Legendary Super Powers Show
  - The Super Powers Team: Galactic Guardians
- Steve Hudson (1980)
  - Never Say Yes to a Cigarette anti-smoking commercials
- Beau Weaver (1988–1989)
  - Superman
- Jonathan Winters (1992)
  - Tiny Toon Adventures: How I Spent My Vacation
- Eric Goldberg (1996)
  - Superior Duck
- Tim Daly (1996–2000, 2002, 2006, 2009–12)
  - Superman: The Animated Series
    - Superman: The Last Son of Krypton
    - The Batman Superman Movie: World's Finest
  - Superman: Shadow of Apokolips
  - Superman: Brainiac Attacks
  - Superman/Batman: Public Enemies
  - Superman/Batman: Apocalypse
  - Justice League: Doom
- Christopher McDonald (2000)
  - Batman Beyond
- George Newbern (2001–08, 2010, 2012–13, 2017–19, 2022)
  - Justice League
  - Static Shock
  - Justice League Unlimited
  - The Batman
  - Superman/Shazam!: The Return of Black Adam
  - Superman vs. The Elite
  - Injustice: Gods Among Us
  - Injustice 2
  - Justice League vs. the Fatal Five
  - DC Universe Online (starting from 2016)
  - MultiVersus
- Jeff Kramer (2002)
  - Superman: The Man of Steel (video game)
- Michael Daingerfield (2005)
  - Krypto the Superdog
- Crispin Freeman (2006)
  - Justice League Heroes
- Yuri Lowenthal (2006–2008)
  - Legion of Super Heroes
- Brandon Routh (2006)
  - Superman Returns
- Adam Baldwin (2007, 2011)
  - Superman: Doomsday
  - DC Universe Online
- Kyle MacLachlan (2008)
  - Justice League: The New Frontier
- Christopher Corey Smith (2008)
  - Mortal Kombat vs. DC Universe
- Joseph May (2009)
  - Batman: Black and White
- David Lodge (2009)
  - Superman: Red Son
- Mark Harmon (2010)
  - Justice League: Crisis on Two Earths
- Nolan North (2010–present)
  - Young Justice
  - Lego DC Comics: Batman Be-Leaguered
  - Lego DC Comics Super Heroes: Justice League vs. Bizarro League
  - Lego DC Comics Super Heroes: Justice League – Attack of the Legion of Doom
  - Lego DC Comics Super Heroes: Justice League – Gotham City Breakout
  - Lego DC Comics Super Heroes: The Flash
  - Lego DC Comics Super Heroes: Aquaman – Rage of Atlantis
  - Lego DC Shazam! Magic and Monsters
  - Batman: Death in the Family
  - Justice League: Cosmic Chaos
- David Kaye (2010)
  - DC Super Friends: The Joker's Playhouse
  - Tales of Metropolis
  - Teen Titans Go!
- James Denton (2011)
  - All-Star Superman
- Roger Rose (2011)
  - Batman: The Brave and the Bold
- Breckin Meyer (2012–2015)
  - Robot Chicken DC Comics Special
  - Robot Chicken DC Comics Special 2: Villains in Paradise
  - Robot Chicken DC Comics Special III: Magical Friendship
- Blair Underwood (2012)
  - Superman of Tokyo
- Jeff Bennett (2012)
  - Superman of Tokyo
- Keith Ferguson (2012)
  - Super Best Friends Forever
- Travis Willingham (2012, 2014–2015, 2018, 2022, 2023)
  - Lego Batman 2: DC Super Heroes
  - Lego Batman 3: Beyond Gotham
  - Lego Dimensions
  - Lego DC Super-Villains
  - Batman and Superman: Battle of the Super Sons
  - Justice League x RWBY: Super Heroes & Huntsmen Part Two
- Mark Valley (2013)
  - Batman: The Dark Knight Returns
- Matt Bomer (2013)
  - Superman: Unbound
- Sam Daly (2013)
  - Justice League: The Flashpoint Paradox
- Channing Tatum (2014–2019)
  - The Lego Movie
  - The Lego Batman Movie
  - The Lego Movie 2: The Second Part
- Peter Jessop (2014)
  - JLA Adventures: Trapped in Time
- Alan Tudyk (2014)
  - Justice League: War
- Jerry O'Connell (2015–2020)
  - Justice League: Throne of Atlantis
  - Justice League vs. Teen Titans
  - Justice League Dark
  - The Death of Superman
  - Reign of the Supermen
  - Batman: Hush
  - Justice League Dark: Apokolips War
- Matthew Mercer (2015)
  - DC Super Friends
- Benjamin Bratt (2015)
  - Justice League: Gods and Monsters Chronicles
  - Justice League: Gods and Monsters
- Jason J. Lewis (2016–2018)
  - Justice League Action
- Kenichi Suzumura (2017)
  - DC Super Heroes vs. Eagle Talon
- Nicolas Cage (2018)
  - Teen Titans Go! To the Movies
- Max Mittelman (2019)
  - DC Super Hero Girls
- Jason Isaacs (2020)
  - Superman: Red Son
- Darren Criss (2020–2024)
  - Superman: Man of Tomorrow
  - Justice Society: World War II
  - Legion of Super-Heroes
  - Justice League: Warworld
  - Justice League: Crisis on Infinite Earths
- Justin Hartley (2021)
  - Injustice
- John Krasinski (2022)
  - DC League of Super-Pets
- Chandler Riggs (2023)
  - Justice League x RWBY: Super Heroes & Huntsmen Part One
- Jack Quaid (2023–present)
  - My Adventures with Superman
- Chris Hackney (2024)
  - DC Heroes United

== Radio and audio ==
- Superman appears in The Adventures of Superman (1940), voiced by Bud Collyer.
- Superman appears in The Adventures of Superman (1966), voiced by Bob Holiday.
- Superman appears in several vinyl albums released by Peter Pan Records during the 1970s and 1980s.
- Superman appears in the BBC radio adaptation of Superman Lives!, voiced by Stuart Milligan.
- Superman appears in the audio drama DC Comics Super Heroes – Attack of the Elementals, voiced by David Waterman.
- Superman appears in the audio drama The Never-Ending Battle, voiced by James Konicek.

== Film ==
=== Animated film ===
- Superman appears in Fleischer Studio's Superman shorts, voiced again by Bud Collyer.
- Superman appears in Tiny Toon Adventures: How I Spent My Vacation, voiced by Jonathan Winters.
- A Superman comic appears in The Iron Giant.
- Superman appears in Superman: Brainiac Attacks, voiced by Tim Daly.
- Superman appears in Superman: Doomsday, voiced by Adam Baldwin.
- Superman appears in Justice League: The New Frontier, voiced by Kyle MacLachlan.
- Superman appears in Superman/Batman: Public Enemies, voiced again by Tim Daly.
- Superman appears in Justice League: Crisis on Two Earths, voiced by Mark Harmon.
- Superman appears in Superman/Batman: Apocalypse, voiced again by Tim Daly.
- Superman appears in Superman/Shazam!: The Return of Black Adam, voiced by George Newbern.
- Superman appears in All-Star Superman, voiced by James Denton.
- Superman appears in Justice League: Doom, voiced again by Tim Daly.
- Superman appears in Superman vs. The Elite, voiced again by George Newbern.
- Superman appears in Batman: The Dark Knight Returns, voiced by Mark Valley.
- Superman appears in Superman: Unbound, voiced by Matt Bomer.
- Superman appears in Lego Batman: The Movie – DC Super Heroes Unite, voiced by Travis Willingham.
- Superman appears in films set in the DC Animated Movie Universe (DCAMU). He is voiced by Sam Daly in Justice League: The Flashpoint Paradox, Alan Tudyk in Justice League: War, and Jerry O'Connell in subsequent films.
- Superman appears in Superman 75th Anniversary, an animated short created by Zack Snyder and Bruce Timm.
- Superman appears in The Lego Movie franchise, voiced by Channing Tatum.
- Superman appears in JLA Adventures: Trapped in Time, voiced by Peter Jessop.
- Superman appears in the Lego DC Comics film series, voiced by Nolan North.
- An alternate universe variant of Superman named Hernan Guerra, with elements of Chris Kent, appears in Justice League: Gods and Monsters, voiced by Benjamin Bratt.
- Superman appears in DC Super Heroes vs. Eagle Talon, voiced by Kenichi Suzumura.
- Superman appears in Teen Titans Go! To the Movies, voiced by Nicolas Cage.
- Superman appears in Justice League vs. the Fatal Five, voiced again by George Newbern.
- Superman appears in Superman: Red Son, voiced primarily by Jason Isaacs and by Tara Strong as a child.
- Superman appears in films set in the Tomorrowverse, voiced by Darren Criss. Introduced in Superman: Man of Tomorrow, he makes subsequent appearances in Justice Society: World War II, Legion of Super-Heroes (2023), Justice League: Warworld, and Justice League: Crisis on Infinite Earths.
- Superman appears in Batman: Death in the Family, voiced again by Nolan North.
- Superman makes a cameo appearance in Space Jam: A New Legacy.
- Superman appears in Injustice, voiced by Justin Hartley.
- Superman appears in DC League of Super-Pets, voiced by John Krasinski.
- Superman appears in Batman and Superman: Battle of the Super Sons, voiced again by Travis Willingham.
- Superman appears in Scooby-Doo! and Krypto, Too!, voiced again by Nolan North. Additionally, the Legion of Super Heroes (2006) incarnation of the character makes a non-speaking cameo appearance.
- Superman appears in the two-part film Justice League x RWBY: Super Heroes & Huntsmen, voiced by Chandler Riggs in Part One and again by Travis Willingham in Part Two.

=== Live-action film ===
- Superman appears in Superman, portrayed by Kirk Alyn.
- Superman appears in Atom Man vs. Superman, portrayed again by Kirk Alyn.
- Superman appears in Superman and the Mole Men, portrayed by George Reeves.
- Superman appears in Stamp Day for Superman, portrayed again by George Reeves.
- Superman appears in Superman (1978) and its sequels, portrayed by Christopher Reeve.
- The Return of Superman (also known as "Turkish Superman") is an adaptation of Superman from Turkey.
- Superman appears in Superman Returns, portrayed by Brandon Routh.
- Superman appears in films set in the DC Extended Universe (DCEU), portrayed primarily by Henry Cavill and by stunt double Ryan Hadley in Shazam!. Introduced in Man of Steel, he makes subsequent appearances in Batman v Superman: Dawn of Justice, Justice League, Shazam!, Zack Snyder's Justice League, Black Adam, and The Flash.
- Superman appears in Superman (2025), portrayed by David Corenswet.

==== Canceled Superman live-action films ====
- In 2017, Jordan Vogt-Roberts pitched a Red Son adaptation to Warner Bros., as an "offshoot" of the DC Extended Universe with different actors for Superman and Batman, but "was told no". Mark Millar responded by saying that two friends of his had been approached by WB to direct a live-action Red Son. An animated film ultimately came out in 2020 as part of the DC Universe Animated Original Movies.

== Television ==
=== Live-action ===
- Superman appears in Adventures of Superman, portrayed by George Reeves.
- Superman appears in Superboy, portrayed initially by John Newton and later by Gerard Christopher.
- Superman appears in Lois & Clark: The New Adventures of Superman, portrayed by Dean Cain.
- Superman appears in Smallville, portrayed by Tom Welling.
- Superman appears in media set in the Arrowverse, portrayed by Tyler Hoechlin. Introduced in Supergirl, he makes subsequent appearances in the crossover events "Elseworlds" and "Crisis on Infinite Earths".
- Superman appears in Superman & Lois, portrayed again by Tyler Hoechlin. This Superman is the doppelgänger of his Earth-38 counterpart from the Arrowverse.
- The DC Extended Universe incarnation of Superman appears in the Peacemaker episode "It's Cow or Never", portrayed by an uncredited actor.
- The DC Universe incarnation of Superman, taking place of the aforementioned DCEU Superman, appears in the Peacemaker second season premiere, "The Ties That Grind".
- A limited series centered on the Val-Zod version of Superman was in development for HBO Max from Michael B. Jordan and his company Outlier Society by the end of July 2021, with Darnell Metayer and Josh Peters hired as the series's writers and Jordan potentially starring in the series and executive producing alongside Elizabeth Raposo.

=== Animated television ===
- Superman appears in The New Adventures of Superman, voiced by Bud Collyer.
- Superman appears in The Batman/Superman Hour, voiced again by Bud Collyer.
- Superman appears in Sesame Street, voiced by Lennie Weinrib.
- Superman appears in The Brady Kids episode "Cindy's Super Friend".
- Superman appears in the Super Friends franchise, voiced by Danny Dark.
- Superman appears in Superman (1988), voiced by Beau Weaver.
- Superman appears in series set in the DC Animated Universe (DCAU), voiced by Tim Daly in Superman: The Animated Series, George Newbern in subsequent series, Jesse Batten as an infant, Shane Haboucha as a child, Jason Marsden as a teenager, and Christopher McDonald in Batman Beyond.
- Superman appears in the Krypto the Superdog pilot episode "Krypto's Scrypto", voiced by Michael Daingerfield.
- Superman appears in Legion of Super Heroes, voiced by Yuri Lowenthal.
- Superman appears in The Batman, voiced again by George Newbern.
- Superman appears in Batman: The Brave and the Bold, voiced by Roger Rose.
- Superman appears in Young Justice, voiced by Nolan North.
- Superman appears in the Mad segment "That's What Super Friends Are For".
- Superman appears in Robot Chicken, voiced by Breckin Meyer.
- Superman appears in Justice League Action, voiced by Jason J. Lewis.
- Superman appears in DC Super Hero Girls, voiced by Max Mittelman.
- Superman appears in Harley Quinn, voiced by James Wolk.
- Superman appears in My Adventures with Superman, voiced primarily by Jack Quaid and by Kari Wahlgren as a child. Additionally, the versions of Superman from Earth-17 (Overman), the Fleischer cartoons, Super Friends, DC Animated Universe, and Justice Lords universe make cameo appearances in the episode "Kiss Kiss Fall in Portal".
- Superman appears in Teen Titans Go!, voiced by David Kaye.
- Superman appears in DC Heroes United, voiced by Chris Hackney.

=== Canceled Superman animated series ===
- At one point, an untitled Superman animated project was in conceptual stage, with designs by James Tucker.
- There were plans to make an animated series featuring Superman and Batman. It would have been an origin story.
- Animator Genndy Tartakovsky was developing a Superman short for DC Nation back in 2013, but the block's cancellation in the following year resulted in this animated project getting cut. Early design work on the short was completed.
- In May 2018, Vinton Heuck and Sean Galloway pitched a Superman Family animated series to Warner Bros. Animation, who rejected it in favor of Harley Quinn. The characters would have included Kong Kenan, Jon Kent, Damian Wayne, Mister Mxyzptlk, and Natasha Irons/Steel, among others.

== Video games ==
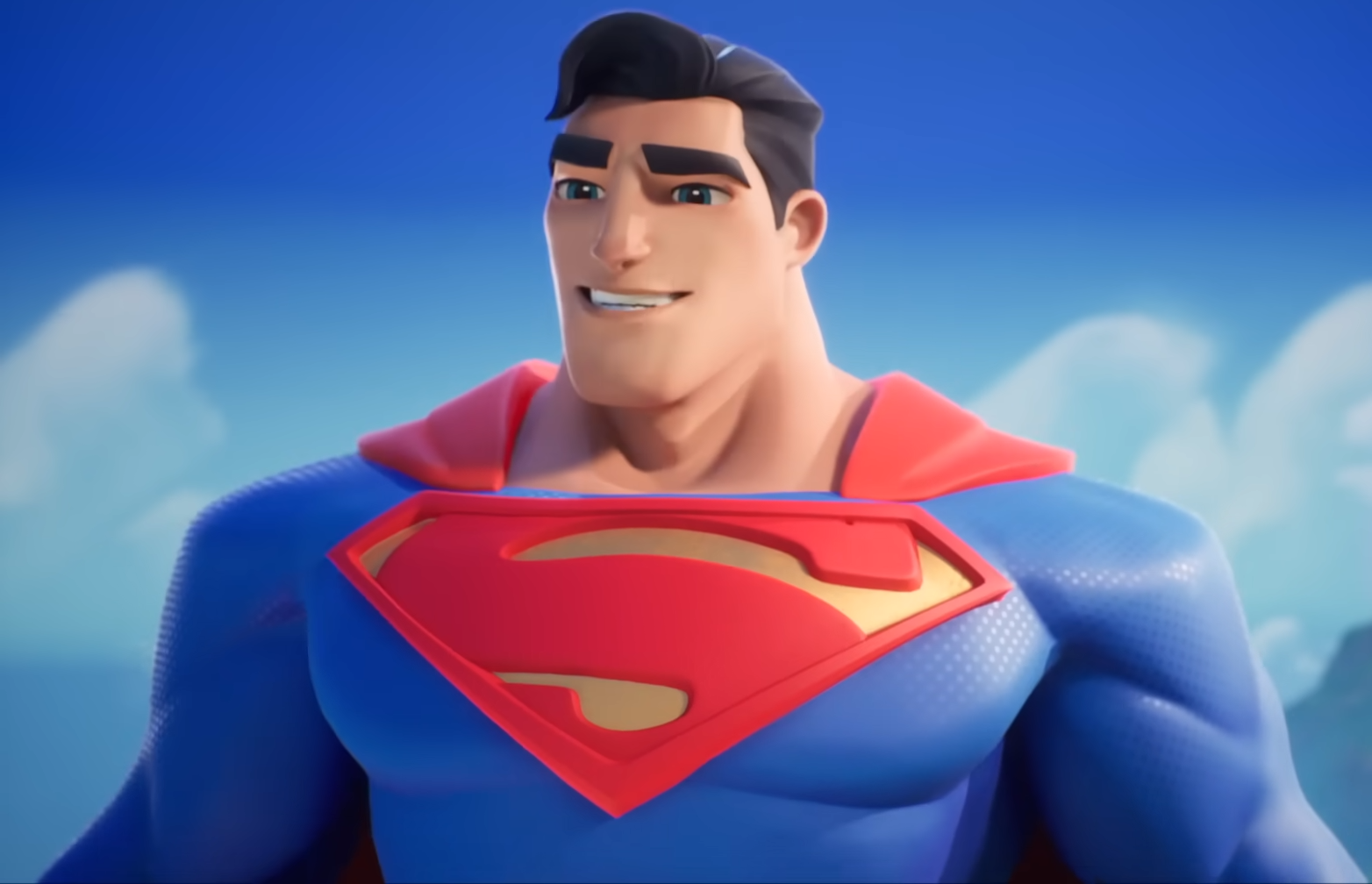
Superman in the trailer of MultiVersus

- Superman appears in Superman (1979).
- Superman appears in Superman: The Game.
- Superman appears in Superman (1987).
- Superman appears in Superman: Man of Steel.
- Superman appears in Superman (1988).
- Superman appears in Superman: The Man of Steel.
- Superman appears in Superman (1992).
- Superman appears in The Death and Return of Superman.
- Superman appears in Justice League Task Force.
- Superman appears in Superman 64.
- Superman appears in The Multipath Adventures of Superman: Menace of Metallo.
- Superman appears in Superman: The Man of Steel, voiced by Jeff Kramer.
- Superman appears in Justice League: Injustice for All.
- Superman appears in Superman: Shadow of Apokolips, voiced again by Tim Daly.
- Superman appears in Superman: Countdown to Apokolips.
- Superman appears in Justice League: Chronicles.
- Superman appears in Superman: The Greatest Hero.
- Superman appears in Justice League Heroes, voiced by Crispin Freeman.
- Superman appears in the Superman Returns tie-in game.
- Superman appears in Mortal Kombat vs. DC Universe, voiced by Christopher Corey Smith.
- Superman appears in DC Universe Online, voiced by Adam Baldwin.
- Superman appears in Lego Batman 2: DC Super Heroes, voiced by Travis Willingham.
- Superman appears in Injustice: Gods Among Us, voiced again by George Newbern.
- Superman appears in Scribblenauts Unmasked: A DC Comics Adventure.
- Superman appears in Young Justice: Legacy, voiced again by Nolan North.
- Superman appears in The Lego Movie Videogame.
- Superman appears in Lego Batman 3: Beyond Gotham, voiced again by Travis Willingham.
- Superman appears in Lego Dimensions.
- Superman appears in Injustice 2, voiced again by George Newbern.
- Superman appears in DC Unchained.
- Superman appears in Lego DC Super-Villains, voiced again by Travis Willingham.
- Superman appears in DC Battle Arena, voiced by P.M. Seymour.
- Superman appears in MultiVersus, voiced again by George Newbern.
- Superman appears in Justice League: Cosmic Chaos, voiced again by Nolan North.

== Theatre and live performances ==
- Superman appeared at the 1940 New York World's Fair, portrayed by Ray Middleton.
- Superman appears in It's a Bird... It's a Plane... It's Superman, portrayed by Bob Holiday.
- Superman appears in The History of Invulnerability, a play about his history and the childhood of his co-creator Joe Shuster.
- Superman appears in Holy Musical B@man!, portrayed by Brian Holden.

== Literature and printed media ==
- 1942: The Adventures of Superman by George Lowther
- 1971: Man of Steel, Woman of Kleenex by Larry Niven
- 1978: Last Son of Krypton by Elliot S! Maggin
- 1981: Miracle Monday by Elliot S! Maggin
- 1983: Superman III (novelization) by William Kotzwinkle
- 1991: "Übermensch!" by Kim Newman
- 1993: Superman: Doomsday & Beyond by Louise Simonson, illustrated by Dan Jurgens and José Luis García-López
- 1994: The Death and Life of Superman by Roger Stern
- 1996: Lois & Clark: A Superman Novel by C. J. Cherryh
- 2005: It's Superman! by Tom De Haven
- 2005: Superman Returns (novelization), by Marv Wolfman
- 2007: The Last Days of Krypton by Kevin J. Anderson
- 2009: Enemies & Allies by Kevin J. Anderson

== Newspaper ==
Superman was a daily newspaper comic strip which began on January 16, 1939, and a separate Sunday strip was added on November 5, 1939. These strips ran continuously until May 1966. In 1941, the McClure Syndicate had placed the strip in hundreds of newspapers. At its peak, the strip, featuring Superman, was in over 300 daily newspapers and 90 Sunday papers, with a readership of over 20 million.

== Attractions and theme park rides ==
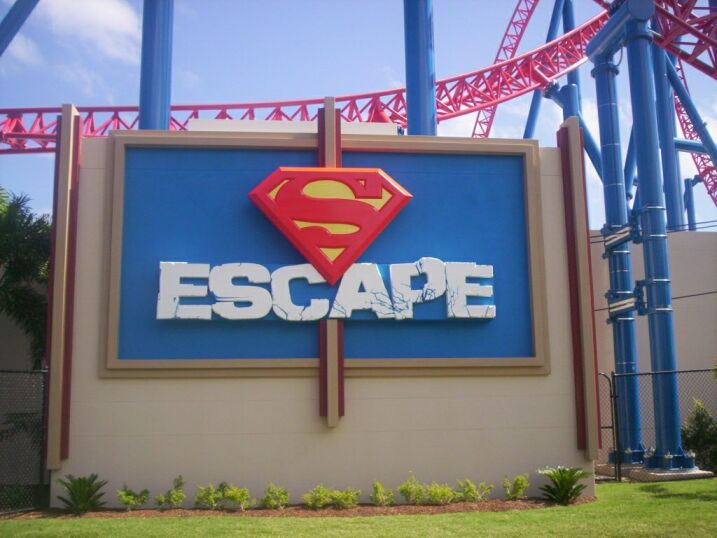
Superman Escape at Warner Bros. Movie World

- Superman: Escape from Krypton, roller coaster at Six Flags Magic Mountain.
- Superman: Ultimate Flight, roller coaster at Six Flags Over Georgia, Six Flags Great Adventure, and Six Flags Great America.
- Superman: Ultimate Flight, roller coaster at Six Flags Discovery Kingdom
- Superman – Ride of Steel, roller coaster at Six Flags America.
- Superman: Krypton Coaster, roller coaster at Six Flags Fiesta Texas.
- Superman el Último Escape, roller coaster at Six Flags México.
- Superman la Atracción de Acero, roller coaster at Parque Warner Madrid
- Superman Escape, roller coaster at Warner Bros. Movie World.
- Superman: Tower of Power tower ride at Six Flags Over Texas and Six Flags St. Louis.

== Art ==
- 2007: Beautiful Superman, a sculpture by David Herbert, exhibited in 2008 in The Hague Sculpture in The Hague.
- In 2012, a statue of Superman was unveiled in the baggage claim of the Cleveland Hopkins International Airport in Cleveland, Ohio. The effort to create the installation was undertaken by the Siegel and Shuster Society, a fan organization that seeks to honor the legacy of Superman and his creation in Cleveland.

== Parodies ==
Superman depicted as stricken by AIDS, in an awareness campaign

- The cartoon Underdog in which Shoeshine Boy becomes "Underdog" with the help of an energy pill.
- The cartoon series Groovy Goolies featured dimwitted Frankie as "Super Ghoul".
- Walt Disney's Goofy did a parody of Superman with the help of "super goobers" {Peanuts} in which Goofy became "Super Goof" clothed in red underwear with "SG" and a blue cape and endowed with super ears, super sight, super strength, super voice and super flying. Goofy's crime fighting always interrupted his date with Clarabelle Cow.
- Warner Brothers' Daffy Duck did a parody of Superman as Stupor Duck.
- The 2019 superhero horror film Brightburn is a dark deconstruction of the Superman character.
- Superman's image was used in an AIDS awareness campaign by French organization AIDES. Superman was depicted as emaciated and breathing from an oxygen tank, demonstrating that no-one is beyond the reach of the disease, and it can destroy the lives of everyone.

== Merchandising ==
- Sunnyland Refining Co., in 1981, marketed jars of creamy and crunchy peanut butter using the familiar image of Superman. In the 50th anniversary publication Fifty Who Made DC Great, it was noted that this was DC's first licensing deal for a brand of food. Soon he had his own hot cocoa mix in 1983.
- A Superman pinball machine was produced by Atari in 1979.
- Superman is part of the DC Deckbuilding Game by Cryptozoic Entertainment.

== Casting tradition ==
There is a tradition of past Superman actors returning for new works in the franchise. The first instance in live action was Noel Niell, who played Lois Lane in the serial films, reprising the role in the first TV series. Niell is also one of three Lois actresses to have subsequently played Lois' mother Ella. Aside from reappearances by actors, Christopher Reeve's son Will Reeve appears in the 2025 film as a tribute to his father. Below is a table showing actors who have made appearances across multiple live-action works that feature unobscured Superman characters.

- A indicates an appearance through archival footage or audio.
- O indicates an older version of the character.
- S indicates an appearance through use of special effects.
- V indicates a voice-only role.
- Y indicates a younger version of the character.

Actor	Superman Atom Man vs. Superman (1948, 1950)	Superman and the Mole Men Adventures of Superman Stamp Day Kellogg's ads Funny Boners I Love Lucy (1951–1958)	It's a Bird… It's a Plane… It's Superman! (1975)	Superman The Muppet Show II Glico ads III Supergirl Kenner ads IV (1978–1987)	Superboy (1988–1992)	Seinfeld media (1989–1998, 2004)	Lois & Clark: The New Adventures of Superman (1993–1997)	Steel (1997)	Smallville (2001–2011)	Superman Returns (2006)	Man of Steel Carl's Jr. ads Batman V Superman Justice League Black Adam The Flash (2013–2023)	Arrow The Flash Legends of Tomorrow Supergirl Batwoman (2012–2021)	Powerless (2017)	Titans Doom Patrol (2018–2021)	Krypton (2019–2020)	Superman & Lois (2021–2024)	Superman Supergirl (2025, 2026)
Kirk Alyn	Superman			Sam Lane													
Noel Neill	Lois Lane	Lois Lane		Ella Lane	Alexis	Tourist				Gertrude Vanderworth							
Pierre Watkin	Perry White	Harry Green Airline Official Admiral Sir Lancelot															
Herbert Rawlinson	Graham	Rozan															
George Reeves		Superman									Superman (alternate)^{A}						
Phyllis Coates		Lois Lane					Ella Lane										
Jack Larson		Jimmy Olsen		Train passenger	Lou Lamont	Elderly man	Jimmy Olsen^{O}			Bo the bartender							
Kenneth Mars			Max Mencken				Grant Gendell										
Marlon Brando				Jor-El						Jor-El^{A}^{S}							
Glenn Ford				Jonathan Kent										Jonathan Kent^{V}^{A}			
Christopher Reeve				Superman					Dr. Virgil Swann		Superman (alternate)^{S}						
Margot Kidder				Lois Lane					Bridgette Crosby								
Marc McClure				Jimmy Olsen					Dax-Ur		Officer Ben Sadowsky Jerry		Emily's father				
Terence Stamp				General Zod					Jor-El^{V}								
Sarah Douglas				Ursa								Jinda Kol Rozz					
Annette O'Toole				Lana Lang					Martha Kent								
Helen Slater				Supergirl		Becky Gelke			Lara-El		Supergirl (alternate)^{S}	Eliza Danvers					
Jon Cryer				Lenny Luthor								Lex Luthor					
Paula Marshall					Christina Riley	Sharon											
Sherman Howard					Lex Luthor Warren Eckworth	Roy											
Adam West							Jerry Retchen				Batman (alternate)^{A}		Chairman West				
Charles Napier							Sailin' Whalen	Colonel David									
Dean Cain							Superman		Dr. Curtis Knox			Jeremiah Danvers					
Teri Hatcher						Sidra Holland	Lois Lane		Ella Lane			Rhea					
Michael McKean							Dr. Fabian Leek		Perry White								
Cress Williams							Baron Sunday					Black Lightning					
Michael Ironside									Sam Lane			Lewis Snart					
Peyton List									Lucy Lane			Golden Glider					
Joe Morton									Steven Hamilton		Silas Stone						
Tom Welling									Clark Kent Jor-El^{Y} Bizarro Ultraman			Clark Kent (alternate)					
Erica Durance									Lois Lane			Lois Lane (alternate) Alura Zor-El Noel Neill					
Laura Vandervoort									Supergirl			Brainiac 8					
Amy Adams									Jodi Melville		Lois Lane						
Michael Cassidy									Grant Gabriel		Jimmy Olsen						
Lynda Carter									Moira Sullivan			Olivia Marsdin					
Sam Witwer									Doomsday			Benjamin Lockwood					
Alan Ritchson									Aquaman			Hawk (alternate)^{A}		Hawk			
Phil Morris									Martian Manhunter				Silas Stone	Silas Stone			
Alessandro Juliani									Dr. Emil Hamilton		Officer Sekowsky						
Brent Stait									Dr. Fate					Dr. Fate^{V}^{A}			
Brandon Routh										Superman		Ray Palmer Superman (alternate)					
David Ramsey												John Diggle				John Diggle	
Grant Gustin												The Flash		The Flash (alternate)^{A}			
Jenna Dewan												Lucy Lane				Lucy Lane	
Jason Mamoa											Aquaman						Lobo
Tyler Hoechlin												Superman				Superman Bizarro	
Elizabeth Tulloch												Lois Lane				Lois Lane	
Tom Cavanagh												Harrison Wells Eobard Thawne Pariah				Gordon Godfrey	
Alan Tudyk													Van Wayne	Mr. Nobody			Robot 4^{V}
Curran Walters												Jason Todd (alternate)^{A}		Jason Todd			
Staz Nair												William Dey			Dax-Baron		
Colin Salmon												Walter Steele			General Zod		
Nikolai Witschl												Caleb Jo Gunraf				Milton "Brainiac" Fine	

== See also ==
- List of actors who have played Superman
