= The Mummy Strikes =

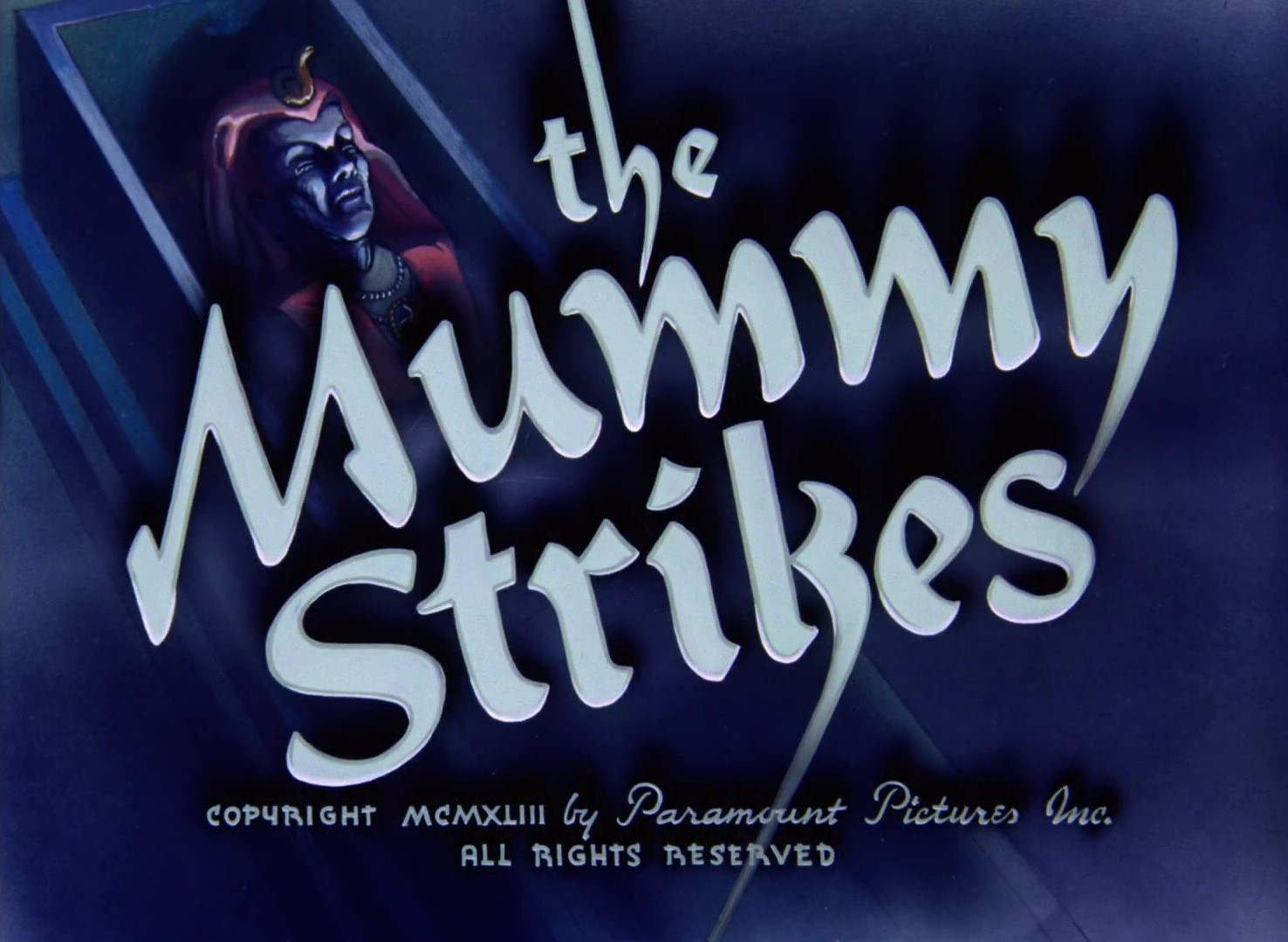
- Title card from The Mummy Strikes
- Directed by: Isadore Sparber
- Story by: Jay Morton
- Based on: Superman by: Jerry Siegel; Joe Shuster
- Produced by: Sam Buchwald
- Music by: Winston Sharples; Sammy Timberg
- Animation by: Myron Waldman; Graham Place
- Color process: Technicolor
- Production company: Famous Studios
- Distributed by: Paramount Pictures
- Release date: February 19, 1943
- Running time: 8 minutes (one reel)
- Language: English

The Mummy Strikes (1943) is the fourteenth of seventeen animated Technicolor short films based upon the DC Comics character Superman. Produced by Famous Studios, the cartoon was originally released to theaters by Paramount Pictures on February 19, 1943.

== Plot ==
Full film

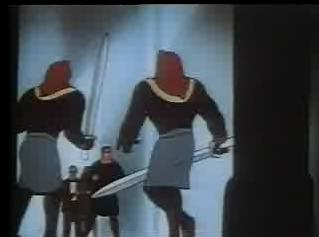
Two mummies attack Superman.

At the Metropolis Museum, Jane Hogan, assistant to the local Egyptologist Dr. Jordan, finds his dead body in front of the sarcophagus of King Tush, an apparent suicide. A syringe full of poison is near Jordan's open hand. Hogan removes the syringe from the scene and consequently is convicted of murder after the syringe is found.

A few days later, Clark Kent gets a call from Dr. Wilson at the museum, saying he has found evidence of Hogan's innocence. Clark leaves, claiming it is his doctor. Following her instincts, Lois tails him. At the museum, Wilson takes Clark through the Egypt exhibit and tells him the story of King Tush (an analog to King Tut). Lois spies on them.

The 12-year-old Tush's father, the pharaoh who ruled the North and warred against the South, commanded his giant-sized superhuman guards to protect his son throughout eternity. After his death, Tush became the pharaoh. King Tush became ill and died. Keeping their promise to the old pharaoh, the guards committed suicide by drinking poison in order to protect King Tush in the afterlife.

Wilson shows Clark the catacombs which Jordan reconstructed in the image of the pyramid interiors. Jordan recreated an ancient formula called the Fluid of Life and injected it into the giant guards' mummified bodies, hoping they would return to life, but seemingly failed. Jordan invoked a curse by trying to open King Tush's sarcophagus. Clark pushes a button on the side of the sarcophagus which triggers a poisoned needle, the true cause of Jordan's death (the poisoned syringe is never explained).

The sarcophagus opens and a light from the dead king's jeweled amulet awakens the mummies of his giant guards. The guards attack Clark, Lois, and Wilson. Clark is thrown into a sarcophagus, where he changes into Superman. As Superman, he saves Lois and Wilson from being thrown into a fire. While battling the giant guards, Superman inadvertently destroys two crucial pillars, bringing the entire catacombs down upon them.

Back at the Daily Planet, Clark finishes his story on Hogan being released from jail and boasts about having scooped Lois for a change. Lois says it was only because she was injured and her arms had to be bandaged up. When Clark asks how she knew to be there, she crosses her bandaged arms and replies "My mummy done told me."
