= Infinite Crisis (video game) =

2014 video game

- Developer: Turbine
- Publisher: Warner Bros. Interactive Entertainment
- Composer: Matthew Harwood
- Platform: Microsoft Windows
- Release: WW: March 26, 2015; Shutdown: WW: August 14, 2015
- Genre: MOBA
- Mode: Multiplayer

Infinite Crisis is a discontinued 2015 multiplayer online battle arena (MOBA) video game based on the fictional universe of DC Comics, developed by Turbine and published by Warner Bros. Interactive Entertainment, loosely based on the comic book series of the same name. The game featured two squads of DC heroes and villains as they competed in combats across multiple destructive battlefields featuring in-game changing catastrophic events. It was a free-to-play game that was supported by micro-transactions.

In Infinite Crisis, players assumed the role of a character called "champion", each character having a set of unique abilities, battling with a team against other players or computer-controlled champions. In the most popular game mode, players controlled their champions, destroying enemy turrets and completing the set objectives. In order to win, each team's goal was to destroy the opposing team's power core, a building inside the enemy base. This goal was achieved by destroying enemy drones and turrets.

As of August 14, 2015, Infinite Crisis and its servers were shut down.

== Gameplay ==
Infinite Crisis was a multiplayer online battle where players controlled a "champion" within a set, short amount of time depending on the game mode. Players gained levels by destroying drones and killing opposing team's champions and turrets. In the classic game mode, the map was divided into three lanes; top, middle and bottom. Top and bottom lanes were longer and had more space between each turret. Mid lane was the shortest route to the enemy's base, but both sides were flanked with urban jungle, providing more strategic game-play for a surprise attack ("gank"). Each lane had a set of inner and outer turrets, one set for the player side and the other for the enemy. Turrets were lethal defensive structures that helped to protect players from enemy champions and helped clear enemy drones. Each bases had three 'dampeners', found at the base entrance. Dampeners were like turrets, but after being destroyed re-spawned minutes later; their 'health' was reduced with each re-spawn. When a dampener was destroyed, the opposing enemy spawned a tougher drone. Base Cameras provided the ability to scout for enemies for a brief period of time. Urban jungle was located beyond a turret's vision, concealed by the fog-of-war. The jungle held four types of neutral drone camps: East Medium, Destroyer and Unique. In the jungle camp, defeating a destroyer camp spawned four different deployables: Health, Speed, Surveillance Tower, and EMP. The objective of the game was to destroy drones in order to level champions which could destroy turrets and then the Power Core in order to win the game.

=== Game modes ===
Infinite Crisis was a session-based game. Each match lasted up to 20 to 40 minutes of game-play. Enemies had to either capture the points and drain the Power Core, or destroy the Power Core to win the game.

Crime Alley

Crime Alley is the site of Thomas and Martha Wayne's murder in the Gaslight Universe and the Prime Universe. This a 1 vs. AI private map designed for new and intermediate players to practice their champion. The map features one lane, one power core turret for each team, one dampener and a single lane turret for each team. The map also features a single jungle lanes for players to experiment with deployables. This map is mostly used to practice or play against another opponent to fight out who is the better skilled player. In order to win, the player needs to destroy the opponents Power Core.

Gotham Divided

In this 5 vs. 5 three-lane map, players can take advantage of the urban jungle by defeating neutral creatures to earn deployable powers and abilities like meteor strikes, EMP blasts and agility. Gotham Divided has two bases: one for the player's team and one for the enemy. The player's objective is to destroy the Power Core inside the enemy base, achieved by destroying enemy drones, turrets, and eventually dampeners.

Gotham Heights

This 5 vs. 5 map features a capture and hold map. The map is shaped like a circle and there are five control points. Each control point is located at the end points of a pentagon shape. The five control points start as neutral, a player may capture the point by standing on it and the capture speed is dramatically increased as more players stand at the point. In order to win the game mode, the player needs to capture majority of the control points as the enemy Power Core health slowly drains. At the center of the map, the orbital cannon is located; the players needs to capture the Orbital Cannon in order to summon stronger drones that would help players capture control points. In the Urban Jungle section, beyond the visible circular lane, it holds speed boost, health packs and the orbital cannon.

Coast City

Coast City features a 5 vs. 5 map that features two-lane map, a large Urban Jungle that holds access to Elite Drones and control of the Doomsday Device. In order to win, players must outmaneuver the enemy team by pushing into their base and destroying its Power Core. The Doomsday Device activates and creates a neutral guardian who attacks the closest Champion in his arena. After defeating the neutral guardian, the guardian drops a device that can be picked up and use to fire at nearby enemy or used as an EMP to blast and stun structures.

== Story ==
When a sudden assault threatens the DC Multiverse where it would have it stood on the brink of destruction, the only hope to combat it is within the different heroes and villains.

Playable characters

- Aquaman
- Atrocitus
- Batman
  - Gaslight Batman
  - Nightmare Batman
- Blue Beetle
- Catwoman
  - Gaslight Catwoman
- Cyborg
- Doomsday
- The Flash
- Green Arrow
- Green Lantern
  - Arcane Green Lantern
  - Atomic Green Lantern
- Harley Quinn
- Hawkgirl
- The Joker
  - Atomic Joker
  - Gaslight Joker
- Katana
- Krypto
- Lex Luthor
- Poison Ivy
  - Atomic Poison Ivy
- Robin
  - Nightmare Robin
- Shazam
- Sinestro
- Solomon Grundy
- Star Sapphire
- Stargirl
- Starro
- Supergirl
  - Arcane Supergirl
- Superman
  - Mecha Superman
  - Nightmare Superman
- Swamp Thing
- Wonder Woman
  - Atomic Wonder Woman
  - Mecha Wonder Woman
- Zatanna

== Development ==
Infinite Crisis is Turbine's first original title since the company's purchase by Warner Brothers in 2010, and the first non-massively multiplayer online role-playing game produced by the studio.

Infinite Crisis began closed beta testing on May 8, 2013. The game went into open beta on March 14, 2014. The team planned on continually introducing new heroes and villains from the multiverse as well as adding in new maps and game modes even as the game was fully released. The game was released on Steam on March 26, 2015. On June 2, 2015, Warner Bros. Interactive Entertainment announced that Infinite Crisis will be shut down in August.

== Reception ==
Reception

Aggregate score
Aggregator	Score
Metacritic	68/100

IGN awarded the game a score of 6.9 out of 10, saying "Infinite Crisis does cool things with its character roles and lore, but lacks enough accessible modes." GameSpot awarded it 6.0 out of 10, saying "you might have expected to see more effort to mask the face of gameplay we've seen regurgitated over the past few years." PC Gamer awarded it 6.0 out 10, saying "Play it for its novel ideas, not because you love Batman. Dwindling player numbers are a cause for concern." On Metacritic, it has a rating of 68 out of 100.

== Digital comic adaptation ==
A 12 part digital miniseries was released, set in the same world as the videogame, written by Dan Abnett.

Title	Material collected	Published date	ISBN
Infinite Crisis: Fight for the Multiverse Vol. 1	Infinite Crisis: Fight for the Multiverse #1-6	August 2015	978-1401254797
Infinite Crisis: Fight for the Multiverse Vol. 2	Infinite Crisis: Fight for the Multiverse #7-12	January 2016	978-1401258498
