= Justice League: Cosmic Chaos =

2023 video game

- Developer: PHL Collective
- Publisher: Outright Games
- Writers: Heather Corson; Drew Maxey; Michael S. Watkins
- Engine: Unity
- Platforms: Nintendo Switch; PlayStation 4; PlayStation 5; Windows; Xbox One; Xbox Series X/S
- Release: March 10, 2023
- Genre: Action-adventure
- Modes: Single-player, multiplayer

Justice League: Cosmic Chaos is an action-adventure game based on the DC Comics superhero team of the same name. Developed by PHL Collective and released by Outright Games in association with Warner Bros. Games, the game revolves around Superman, Batman, and Wonder Woman to stop the machinations of Mr. Mxyzptlk from turning the town of Happy Harbor into his own personal Metropolis.

The game was released on March 10, 2023, for Nintendo Switch, PlayStation 4, PlayStation 5, Windows, Xbox One, and Xbox Series X/S.

== Plot ==
Lucas "Snapper" Carr is elected mayor of his hometown of Happy Harbor, Rhode Island, where his inauguration ceremony gets interrupted when Mr. Mxyzptlk unleashes his magic to summon Starro as he declares himself Mayor instead of Carr. Leaving the Justice League to stop Mxyzptlk's machinations before it is too late.

== Development ==
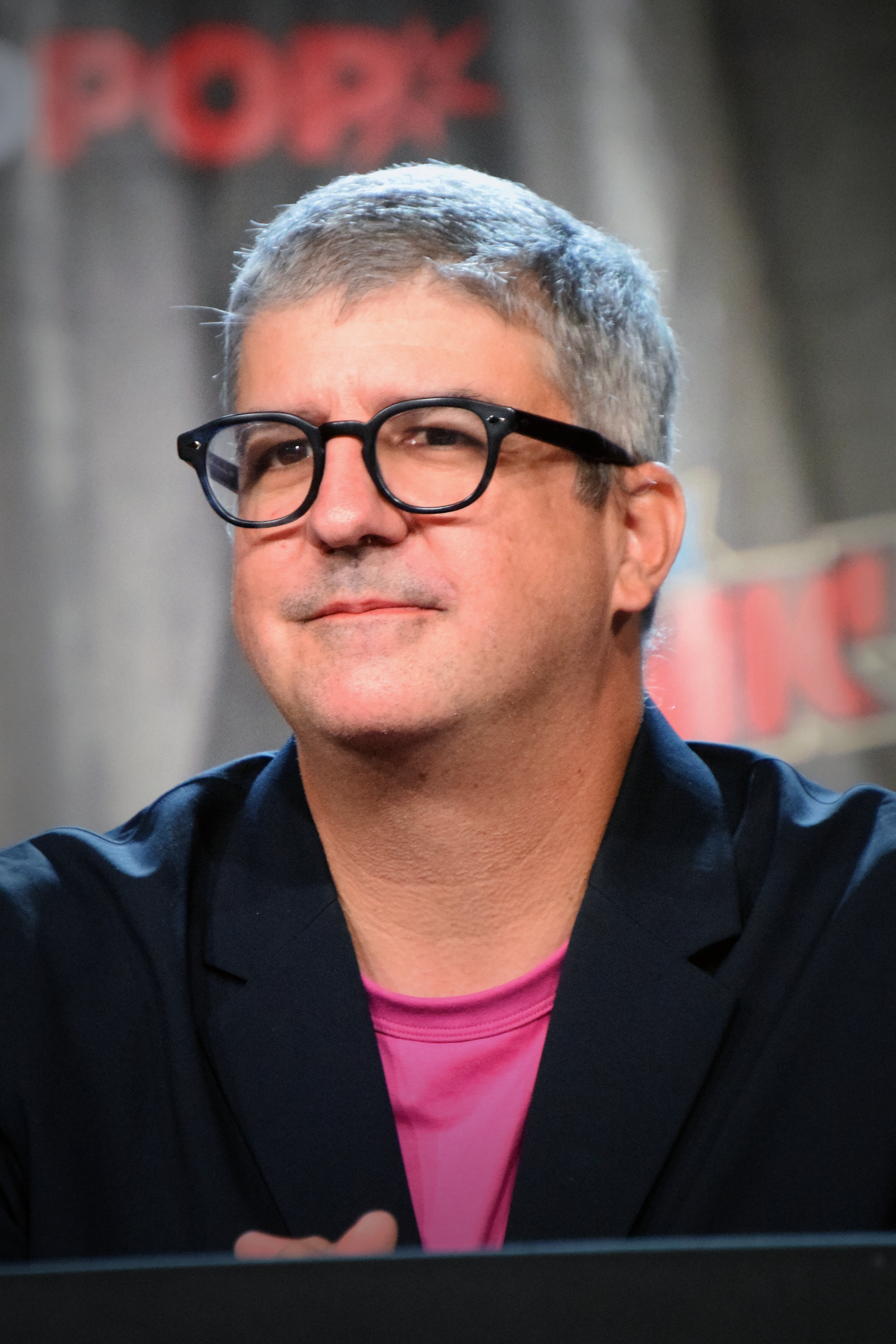
Snyder in 2022

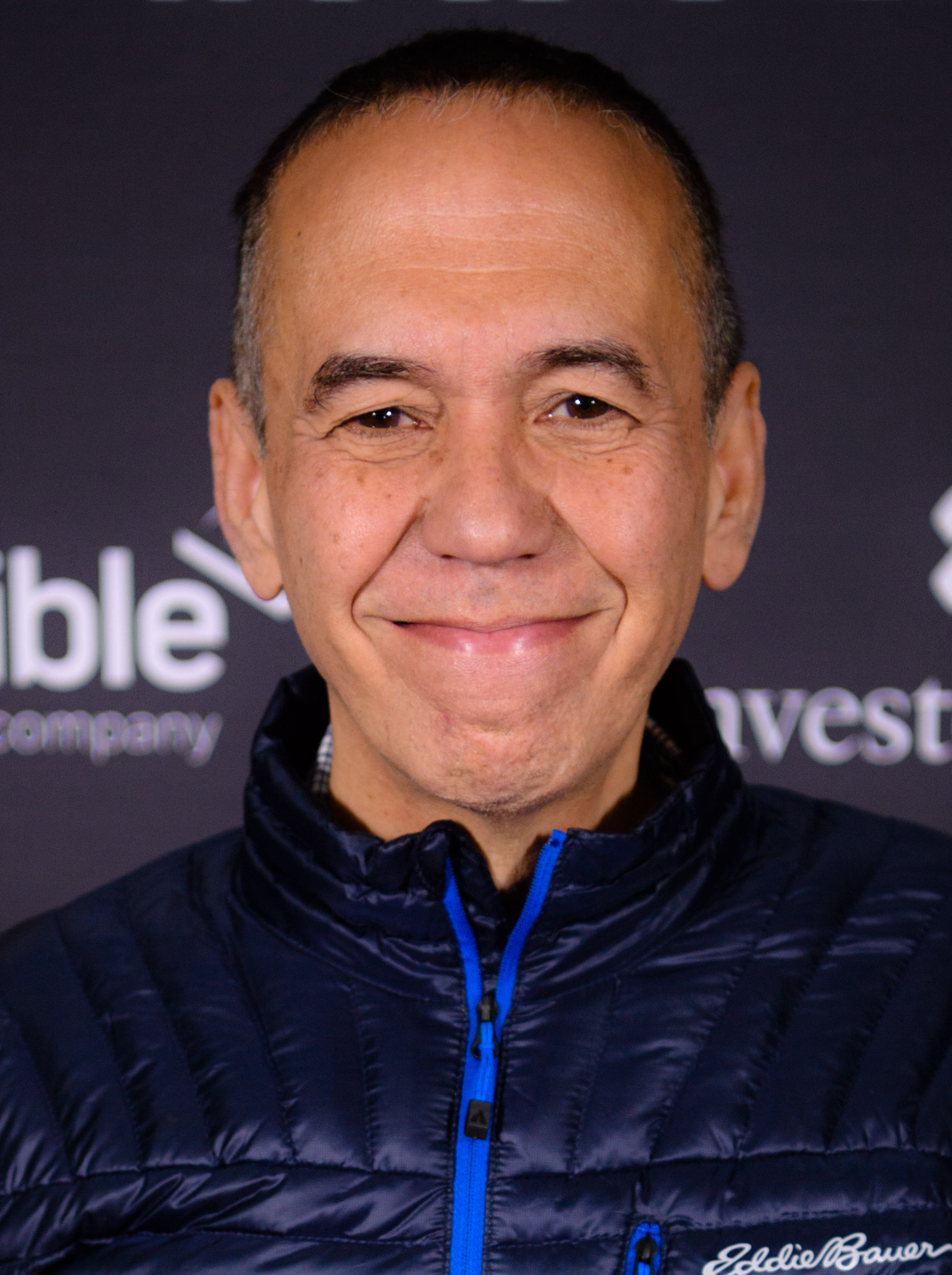
Gottfried in 2016

Prior to Dana Snyder's casting on voicing Mr. Mxyzptlk in Cosmic Chaos, Gilbert Gottfried was approached to reprise his role as the character before his death in April 2022.

The game was announced on May 23, 2022, with a teaser trailer featuring the Justice League members, Superman, Batman, Wonder Woman, the Flash, Aquaman, Green Lantern, and Cyborg. Details for the game were revealed in December of that year, including a new trailer that featured the proper title and the reveal of the game's main antagonist Mr. Mxyzptlk, with the character voiced by Dana Snyder. Justice League: Cosmic Chaos is dedicated to artists Neal Adams, Alan Grant, George Pérez, Tim Sale, prominent Batman voice actor Kevin Conroy, and comedian Gilbert Gottfried, who all died in 2022.

=== Voice acting ===
A month before the game's release, a hands-on sneak preview revealed Nolan North, Diedrich Bader, and Vanessa Marshall reprising their roles as Superman, Batman, and Wonder Woman from previous DC properties. More additional cast members were revealed on February 20, 2022, consisting of Josh Keaton and Cooper Andrews reprising their roles as Flash and Aquaman from the 2015 DC Super Hero Girls series and the Aquaman: King of Atlantis mini-series, Delbert Hunt as Cyborg, and TC Carson as Green Lantern.

== Reception ==
Push Square awarded the PlayStation 5 version of Justice League: Cosmic Chaos a score of seven out of ten, saying, "If you're looking for breezy superhero action that's especially well suited to younger players, then DC's Justice League: Cosmic Chaos is well worth checking out."
