= Justice League: Gods and Monsters Chronicles =

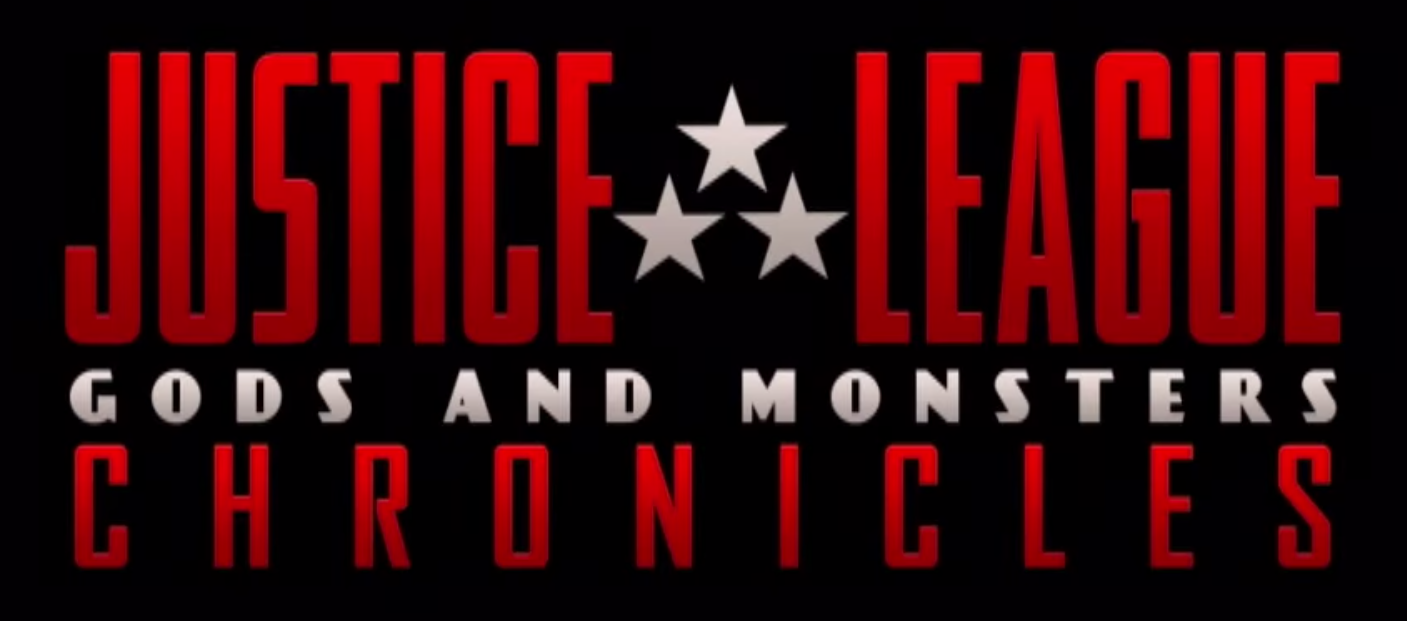
- Logo for the series
- Genre: Drama; Science fiction; Superhero
- Based on: Justice League by Gardner Fox
- Developed by: Bruce Timm; Alan Burnett; Sam Liu
- Starring: Benjamin Bratt; Michael C. Hall; Tamara Taylor
- Composer: Frederik Wiedmann
- Country of origin: United States
- Original language: English
- No. of seasons: 1
- No. of episodes: 3

Production
- Executive producers: Sam Register; Bruce Timm
- Producers: Alan Burnett; Bruce Timm
- Cinematography: Christopher D. Lozinski
- Running time: 6 minutes
- Production companies: DC Entertainment; Warner Bros. Animation; Blue Ribbon Content

Original release
- Network: Machinima
- Release: June 8 – June 12, 2015

Justice League: Gods and Monsters Chronicles is an American animated superhero web series featuring Justice League characters from DC Comics. It first aired on June 8, 2015, on Machinima, a multi-channel network, and was developed by DC Entertainment, Warner Bros. Animation, and Blue Ribbon Content. The series serves as a companion to the animated film Justice League: Gods and Monsters. The first season consisted of three episodes and concluded on June 12.

Although Machinima and Warner Bros. announced that the series was renewed for a second season, which was scheduled to be released in 2016 and have ten episodes, series creator Sam Liu reported that the series was shelved until things are worked out and that he is working on other projects.

== Plot ==
This web series takes place in the alternate reality of Justice League: Gods and Monsters. Each of the initial three episodes showcases one of the film's major characters: Batman, Superman, and Wonder Woman.

== Cast ==
=== Main ===
- Michael C. Hall as Kirk Langstrom / Batman (Ep. 1)
- Benjamin Bratt as Hernan Guerra / Superman (Ep. 2)
- Tamara Taylor as Bekka / Wonder Woman (Ep. 3)

=== Guest ===
- Paget Brewster as Lois Lane (ep. 2)
- Daniel Hagen as Doctor Sivana (ep. 2)
- Penny Johnson Jerald as President Amanda Waller (ep. 2)
- Josh Keaton as White House Aide (ep. 2), Kobra Guard (ep. 3)
- Tahmoh Penikett as Steve Trevor (ep. 3)
- Tara Strong as Harlequin (ep. 1), Brainiac (ep. 2)
- Bruce Thomas as Kobra (ep. 3)

== Crew ==
- Wes Gleason – Casting and Voice Director

== Episodes ==
No. overall	No. in season	Title	Directed by	Written by	Original release date
1	1	"Twisted"	Bruce Timm	Alan Burnett	June 8, 2015/June 5, 2015?
Batman, using retractible wings in his suit, flies over to an abandoned warehouse to confront Harley Quinn, a deranged murderer who kidnaps people, kills them, and then mutilates their corpses or turns them into toys and taxidermy with freakish grins. He enters and finds sinks filled with blood and a refrigerator with frozen corpses, heads and limbs. Upon entering the basement, he finds several crates, clown themed items and large jack-in-the-boxes, one with a top half of one of Harley's victims. When he finds and frees her latest captive from the third box, Harley enters and, enraged at Batman depriving her of a victim, attacks Batman with a large sledgehammer, driving him back as Harley swings it and swats him through the air when he tries to pounce on her from the ceiling. An intense combat sequence ensues, wherein Harley takes up a chainsaw against Batman, having been disarmed of her mallet, which she strikes against a wall and accidentally destroys along with some of her rotting human taxidermy while slashing at Batman. Harley, having wounded her abdomen when her chainsaw was destroyed, gives up the fight and permits Batman to take her to prison, but instead of handing her over to the police, Batman, revealed to have retractable fangs and vampiric hunger, bites her neck and drinks her blood.
2	2	"Bomb"	Bruce Timm	Alan Burnett	June 10, 2015
Brainiac is destroying Metropolis with an immense, red energy field that threatens to wipe out the United States. Since the government is unable to contact Superman, Doctor Sivana recommends that President Amanda Waller order a nuclear strike on the city. Sivana muses out loud that it is ironic that the government needs Superman's help in destroying Brainiac, who was created by the government in an attempt to check Superman's power. Waller reluctantly orders the strike. Before the bomb is dropped, Superman intercepts the bomber and scratches words on his cockpit window, asking him to be given 5 minutes in order to stop Brainiac. Superman flies to the city and struggles against extreme forces and wind generated by the field as he walks towards it. After going inside the energy field, Superman finds Brainiac is a small, mutilated, cybernetic, distraught child who does not know who he is, says that he got away from someone, and that he cannot control his powers. Superman states that he had learned to control his powers when he himself was a child and says that the child must concentrate. The sobbing child however finds himself unable to, driving Superman to believe that he must kill the child to stop him before it's too late. The child, also coming to this realization, pleads for Superman to "do it". Superman uses his heat vision to kill Brainiac and the energy field subsides. Superman then sighs in relief, but is saddened by what he had to do.
3	3	"Big"	Bruce Timm	Alan Burnett	June 12, 2015
Steve Trevor is sent by President Waller on a mission to stop Kobra from unleashing an unknown super-weapon on the world during Amanda Waller's inauguration, by launching it inside a rocket capsule. Before Steve is executed by Kobra at gunpoint after being captured, Wonder Woman teleports to his position via Boom Tube from the Mother Box in her sword and manages to save Steve. Together they defeat Kobra and his henchmen in an intense firefight. As Wonder Woman kills the Kobra Leader with her sword, he presses a detonator that activates the super-weapon, revealed to be Giganta, a blue, towering, female-shaped battle robot that bursts out of the rocket capsule. Due to Trevor's previous insistence that he can handle the mission alone, Wonder Woman does not intervene in the fight while Trevor is repeatedly defeated by Giganta. When Steve is almost crushed in Giganta's hand, he finally asks for help, leading to Wonder Woman cutting off the robot's right arm, saving Trevor, but she is then pummeled into a wall and thrown aside. Giganta pulls off a piece of the metal wall to crush Wonder Woman under while the latter telekinetically summons her sword to her hand to teleport away. Giganta believes she's crushed Wonder Woman under the piece of wall and steps on her before she turns on Steve once more. Before she can kill him, Wonder Woman, using another Boom Tube from her sword, teleports back to the fight onto Giganta's head and pulls out wiring in her brain, disabling her permanently. Before Steve Trevor is able to call Waller to tell her that the mission was a success, he is stopped by Wonder Woman, who proceeds to crush his phone and rip off his damaged shirt, implying that they are about to make love right there and then. Steve nervously asks Wonder Woman "Am I gonna need a safeword?".

== Development ==
The series of shorts which debuted on the Machinima YouTube channel, which were developed to tie into the 2015 animated film Justice League: Gods and Monsters. These shorts ran the month before the release of the film and each episode focuses on one of the three main characters: Batman, Superman, and Wonder Woman. The first season's three episodes were released on June 8, 10, and 12, 2015.

The series is the first collaboration between Warner Bros. and Machinima, following the former's investment of $18 million in Machinima in March 2014. The series is also the first production of Blue Ribbon Content, a digital content production unit of Warner Bros. formed in 2014 and led by president of Warner Bros. Animation Sam Register.
