= Justice League x RWBY: Super Heroes & Huntsmen =

2023 animated superhero film

- Release poster of the Complete Adventure
- Directed by: Kerry Shawcross; Dustin Matthews (Part 2); Yssa Badiola (Part 2)
- Written by: Meghan Fitzmartin
- Based on: RWBY × Justice League by Marguerite Bennett, Aneke, Mirka Andolfo DC/RWBY by Marguerite Bennett, Soo Lee, and Meghan Hetrick
- Produced by: Kimberley S. Moreau; Ethan Spaulding; Jim Krieg
- Starring: Natalie Alyn Lind; Chandler Riggs; Nat Wolff; Jamie Chung; David Dastmalchian
- Music by: David Levy
- Production companies: Warner Bros. Animation; Rooster Teeth Productions; DC Entertainment
- Distributed by: Warner Bros. Home Entertainment (Note: as of December 6, 2024 to the present day, the film's distribution rights were transferred from Warner Bros. Home Entertainment to Viz Media with Warner Bros. via DC retaining the home media distribution rights to the movie)
- Release dates: April 25, 2023 (Part 1); October 17, 2023 (Part 2); December 5, 2023 (The Complete Adventure)
- Running time: Part 1: 83 minutes; Part 2: 75 minutes; The Complete Adventure: 148 minutes
- Country: United States
- Language: English

Justice League × RWBY: Super Heroes & Huntsmen is a 2023 two-part American direct-to-video animated superhero crossover fantasy film loosely based on the limited crossover comic book series RWBY × Justice League and DC/RWBY written by Marguerite Bennett. The films are a co-production of Rooster Teeth Productions, DC Entertainment, and Warner Bros. Animation, the film centers on several members of the Justice League mysteriously turned into teenagers and teleported to Remnant while teaming up with Team RWBY to defeat a superpowered Grimm and a group of supervillains, including an old enemy of RWBY.

Part One first premiered at WonderCon in March 2023 before being released a month later on April 25, 2023. Part Two was released on October 17, 2023.

== Plot ==
=== Part One ===
Clark Kent awakens in the Emerald Forest near Beacon Academy on the world of Remnant, where Ruby Rose and Yang Xiao Long are fighting against a pack of Grimm. On Remnant, Clark has gained a semblance that only works in sunlight, making him realize he's much weaker than he normally is and that there are some of his powers he can't use. The two sisters notice that the Grimm can absorb dust and fire lasers, which is unusual. In Menagerie, Blake Belladonna meets Diana Prince while Weiss Schnee meets Bruce Wayne in Atlas, who has also gained a semblance and is a bat faunus. Inside Beacon Academy, Ruby, Yang and Clark unite with Blake and Diana and later find members of Team JNPR Jaune Arc, Nora Valkyrie and Lie Ren with Mari McCabe, Victor Stone, Barry Allen and Jessica Cruz from the Justice League.

The Justice League, who have all become teenagers, put what they remember together and deduce that they were fighting something mechanical before, while also realizing that while in Remnant, the semblance powers they have gained make them much weaker than they normally would be on Earth. Barry being much slower and having lower stamina, Diana's powers coming from her weapons instead of within, Victor's technology matching Remnant's era and therefore much inferior to his usual tech, and Mari and Jessica not even having their respective totem necklace and Green Lantern ring that give them their powers. Meanwhile teams RWBY and JNPR deduce that events such as the Fall of Beacon have apparently not happened, making them suspicious if this is the real Remnant.

Blake, Yang, and Diana set out to find Bruce and Weiss who ultimately come to the conclusion that this is a digital simulation of Remnant, Jaune remains with Jessica to help her find her ring while the others set out to find the cause of their current predicament. The third team comes into conflict with the Grimm, with a Wyvern amongst them and a fatal blow only causes a Leviathan to appear beside it. Jessica and Jaune are suddenly trapped in a white space with a Seer Grimm which, unlike many other things, was real and after getting out are lured into another trap by a simulated Pyrrha Nikos.

Blake, Yang and Diana along with Bruce and Weiss join Ruby, Clark, Nora, Ren, Mari, Victor and Barry with Bruce revealing that Barry is possessed by Kilg%re, who reveals that he turned the Justice League into teenagers (so their insecurities would reemerge and distract them) while trapping them along with Teams RWBY and JNPR in this Simulation with the collaboration of someone from Remnant and Bruce learns from a conscious Barry that Kilg%re is trapped as well. With Jaune's encouragement, Jessica frees the two of them from the trap and join the heroes and together they exorcise Kilg%re from Barry, the latter giving Mari's necklace and Jessica's ring back to them. Kilg%re then possesses the Wyvern but is ultimately defeated. The Justice League and Remnant's heroes bid farewell to each other and return to their respective worlds, with teams RWBY and JNPR awakening in Atlas from what was supposed to be a training simulation.

=== Part Two ===
After escaping the digital trap, Justice League members Superman, Wonder Woman, Batman, Cyborg, Flash, Green Lantern and Vixen wake up as adults in the Hall of Justice. Black Canary informs them that they were unconscious after their battle with Kilg%re and were brought in to heal; the Grimm are also attacking their world. They decide to call team RWBY in Remnant for help. In the meantime, the Justice League try to contain the situation and come across Kilg%re possessing a Goliath who indirectly gives them a clue about his ally while a Death Stalker poisons Batman, the one who would likely discover him. Meanwhile in Vacuo, Team RWBY save two civilians from a King Taijitu Grimm.

The Justice league eventually call team RWBY from their world where three days have passed since their encounter but weeks in Remnant, with Team RWBY using an abandoned SDC laboratory to reach their world. After arriving, Team RWBY's appearance and powers change, with Blake losing her Faunus traits and has the ability to shadow bend, Ruby's sister Yang gains the power of fire fist's, Ruby has teleportation powers, and Weiss becoming a normal human. The Justice league bring RWBY up to speed regarding Grimm evolving against their powers and attacking their weaknesses, with both sides realizing that a new Grimm is attacking Central City. Weiss, Blake, Lantern and Cyborg leave for Gotham to find the poison for an antidote for Batman, while the others leave for Central City. The first team encounters a Sea Feilong, with Weiss retrieving a sample of the poison. They later join the team in Central City to destroy the Grimm.

After returning to the Hall of Justice and putting their clues together, the heroes learn that Kilg%re's mysterious ally is Doctor Arthur Watts, an agent of Salem who created a digital copy of his own consciousness as a contingency plan which escaped to the Earth with Kilg%re after the Fall of Atlas. The heroes then train together. While preparing the antidote, Weiss discusses her identity crisis with Batman after the loss of her home. Cyborg and Vixen receive a call for help from Kilg%re while trying to discover the Grimm's power source. When discussing whether to trust him or not, tension reaches its peak when Yang expresses her concern for Ruby's well-being due to her reckless behavior, but the latter ensures her that she will be fine, deciding in the end to go along with Kilg%re and recruit Weather Wizard, Mirror Master and Killer Croc if it was a trap.

The Justice League and Team RWBY meet with Kilg%re, who indeed along with Watts was planning a trap. Aided by the aforementioned rogues, the heroes lure the duo into cyber space who try to manipulate it to their advantage, with Kilg%re possessing Wonder Woman and Yang, Flash absorbs him from the latter to keep him under control but Lantern's attempt to help results in her possession. While fighting, Ruby is injured but refuses Yang's demand to leave the battle. She implores Yang to cease her overprotectiveness and trust her as a Huntress and they reconcile. While by using Dust, Cyborg tries to find a way to fix the situation. Team RWBY corners Watts who reveals his own ambitions and deceptions, like trapping Kilg%re in the simulation so he would kill team RWBY and the Justice League for him. Realizing this, Kilg%re possesses Watts and the two start to bicker. Seizing the opportunity, the heroes defeat their enemies and trap them in a virtual prison, ending the Grimm's rampage in the real world. With the incident resolved, team RWBY bids farewell to the Justice League and return to their own world.

== Voice cast ==
Character	Voice actor
Appearing in both parts
Clark Kent / Superman	Chandler Riggs (part one) / Travis Willingham (part two)
Bruce Wayne / Batman	Nat Wolff (part one) / Troy Baker (part two)
Diana Prince / Wonder Woman	Natalie Alyn Lind (part one) / Laura Bailey (part two)
Victor Stone / Cyborg	Tru Valentino
Ruby Rose	Lindsay Jones
Weiss Schnee	Kara Eberle
Blake Belladonna	Arryn Zech
Yang Xiao Long	Barbara Dunkelman
Barry Allen / The Flash	David Errigo Jr. (part one) / David Dastmalchian (part two)
Jessica Cruz / Green Lantern	Jeannie Tirado
Mari McCabe / Vixen	Ozioma Akagha
Kilg%re	Tru Valentino
Part One
Jaune Arc	Miles Luna
Nora Valkyrie	Samantha Ireland
Lie Ren	Neath Oum
Professor Ozpin	Shannon McCormick
Oscar Pine	Aaron Dismuke
Glynda Goodwitch	Tiana Camacho
Jacques Schnee	Jason Douglas
Kali Belladonna	Tara Platt
Rolf	David Errigo Jr.
Pyrrha Nikos	Jen Brown
Part Two
Dr. Arthur Watts	Christopher Sabat
Dinah Lance / Black Canary	Jamie Chung
Klein Sieben	J. Michael Tatum
Mark Mardon / Weather Wizard	Travis Willingham
Sam Scudder / Mirror Master	Troy Baker
Waylon Jones / Killer Croc	Maxwell Friedman

== Production ==
The film was announced at RTX 2022 with a release date around 2023. Around February 2023, the trailer was released and revealed the title, cast and the release date and that it would be a two-part film much like Batman: The Long Halloween.

On February 2, 2023, James Gunn confirmed that all DC animated projects are being released as part of DC Elseworlds.

== Release ==
Part One was released on April 25, 2023.

Part Two was released on October 17, 2023.

The Complete Adventure was released on December 5, 2023.

== Reception ==
Part One received mostly positive reviews from critics. Sam Stone of Comic Book Resources praised the film's ensemble, pacing and action sequences. Ricky Church of Flickering Myth praised the film's voice acting and writing.
