= Lego DC Comics Super Heroes: The Flash =

- Blu-ray cover
- Directed by: Ethan Spaulding
- Written by: Jim Krieg; Jeremy Adams
- Based on: The Flash by Robert Kanigher and Carmine Infantino
- Starring: James Arnold Taylor; Dwight Schultz; Troy Baker; Nolan North
- Edited by: Chris Mertens
- Music by: Tim Kelly
- Production companies: The Lego Group; DC Entertainment; Warner Bros. Animation
- Distributed by: Warner Bros. Home Entertainment
- Release dates: February 13, 2018 (Digital); March 13, 2018 (DVD and Blu-ray)
- Running time: 78 minutes
- Country: United States
- Language: English

Lego DC Comics Super Heroes: The Flash is a 2018 American animated superhero comedy film. It is a superhero action-adventure comedy, based on the DC Comics and Lego brands. It is produced by DC Entertainment, The Lego Group and Warner Bros. Animation and distributed by Warner Bros. Home Entertainment, and was released digitally on February 13, 2018 and was released on DVD and Blu-ray on March 13, 2018. It is the seventh Lego DC Comics film. This is the first posthumous release for longtime DC producer Benjamin Melniker, who died a month before its release. The film received positive reviews from critics, who praised the action, humor, and animation.

== Plot ==
The second Atom is introduced into the Justice League as the Joker poisons Metropolis with his Joker gas and remodels the Daily Planet. Flash arrives late after stopping for food and catching Captain Cold and Captain Boomerang. The Justice League is upset with his impulsive decisions when a yellow, vibrating speedster taunts Flash for his inferior speed. Following a chase, Flash wakes up in his bed the next day; after recognizing the events from the previous day, Flash realizes he traveled back in time to the morning of that day and is able to stop the Joker. The yellow speedster taunts the Flash again and the Flash enters a time loop, repeatedly chasing the speedster and stopping the crimes of that day. Batman gives Flash advice on how to stop it, but the yellow speedster gives Flash the chase again. In a dimensional gateway, Flash pushes his power past its maximum to overtake the speedster and break the loop.

In Central City, Flash's powers are gone and the city has turned against him. Superman and Batman removes him from the Justice League after being framed for pulling pranks on the League. The yellow speedster reveals himself as the Reverse Flash–envious of Flash's fame, Reverse Flash traveled from the future to steal his (and the Justice League's) fame. In atomic size, Atom hears everything, though as Reverse Flash restrains Flash, his suit short-circuits, preventing him from returning to normal size. Atom frees Flash and phones Doctor Fate to help Flash regain his powers. Flash is teleported to Fate and Atom attempts returning to the Hall of Justice to explain Reverse Flash's plan to the League. Reverse Flash commits acts of heroism at a rate quicker than the Justice League, gaining him popularity with the public and leading the Justice League to announce their retirement.

Flash is introduced to Fate and his assistant Zatanna. After Flash explains his predicament, Fate explains the Speed Force and reveals that Flash broke his connection to it. Fate and Zatanna send Flash into the Speed Force, where he will complete various trials to prove his worthiness of his powers. Flash completes the trials and finds the Speed Force Nexus, the primary source of power in the Speed Force. Reverse Flash arrives, having planned for Flash to complete the trials so he could acquire the Nexus without doing them himself, and places the Nexus into his suit, exponentially increasing his powers. Flash is left trapped in the Speed Force.

With the Speed Force Nexus, Reverse Flash encases the Hall of Justice in a statue of himself, made of bricks from the Speed Force that are impervious to their powers. Atom, with the help of Ace the Bat-Hound, Krypto and the Green Lantern B'dg, repairs his suit and helps the League escape to the Batcave. Flash returns from the Speed Force by creating a vehicle out of the same Speed Force bricks.

Reverse Flash builds more statues of himself and declares himself the ruler of Earth. He threatens those that disobey him will meet the same fate as the Justice League. The League, using bricks Flash brought from the Speed Force, rivals Reverse Flash's speed and destroys his statues as a distraction so Flash can steal the Speed Force Nexus from him. Flash regains his powers, with greater speed than Reverse Flash. Flash taunts Reverse Flash into exceeding the maximum of his powers; depowered, Reverse Flash is arrested by the League at the Hall of Justice. Flash takes him to prison and returns the Nexus to the Speed Force before being reinstated into the Justice League.

Flash is grateful for the restoration of his powers and the Justice League's advice. The Justice League celebrate their victory as Doctor Fate overlooks everything.

== Cast ==
- James Arnold Taylor as Barry Allen / Flash
- Troy Baker as Bruce Wayne / Batman
- Eric Bauza as Ryan Choi / Atom, B'dg, Jimmy Olsen
- Grey Griffin as Diana Prince / Wonder Woman, Lois Lane
- Tom Kenny as Plastic Man, Penguin
- Phil LaMarr as Firestorm
- Vanessa Marshall as Poison Ivy
- Dee Bradley Baker as Captain Boomerang, Aquaman
- Kate Micucci as Zatanna
- Nolan North as Kal-El / Clark Kent / Superman, Killer Croc
- Khary Payton as Victor Stone / Cyborg
- Kevin Michael Richardson as Doctor Fate, Captain Cold
- Dwight Schultz as Reverse-Flash
- Jason Spisak as Joker
- Audrey Wasilewski as Mayor Wimbley

== Release ==
The film was released digitally on February 13, 2018 and on DVD and Blu-ray on March 13, 2018. The film later aired on Cartoon Network on May 28, 2018 and was watched by 703,000 viewers.

== Accolades ==
In 2019, the film won a Daytime Emmy Award for Outstanding Sound Editing for an Animated Program.
