= Robot Chicken DC Comics Special 2: Villains in Paradise =

- Written by: Matthew Beans; Hugh Davidson; Mike Fasolo; Seth Green; Geoff Johns; Breckin Meyer; Matthew Senreich; Kevin Shinick; Zeb Wells
- Directed by: Seth Green; Zeb Wells
- Voices of: See § Voice cast
- Narrated by: Kevin Shinick

Production
- Production companies: DC Entertainment; Stoopid Monkey; Stoopid Buddy Stoodios; Sony Pictures Television; Warner Bros. Animation; Williams Street

Original release
- Network: Adult Swim
- Release: April 6, 2014

Related
- Robot Chicken DC Comics Special; Robot Chicken DC Comics Special III: Magical Friendship

Robot Chicken DC Comics Special 2: Villains in Paradise is an episode of the television comedy series Robot Chicken and it was aired as a half-hour special during Cartoon Network's Adult Swim on April 6, 2014. It serves as the sequel to the Robot Chicken DC Comics Special that focuses more on the Legion of Doom and is followed by Robot Chicken DC Comics Special III: Magical Friendship.

== Segments ==
=== Arkham Breakout ===
In the opening segment, the villains escape from Arkham Asylum, which is being guarded by the characters of Robot Chicken.

=== Buying Cookies ===
Bizarro has difficulty communicating with a girl scout.

=== Working for Doom ===
At the headquarters of the Legion of Doom, the villains have mundane problems. Lex Luthor brings his daughter Lena to work at Hall of Doom Coffee during her spring break. When Black Adam asks Gorilla Grodd if Weather Wizard wants coffee, he states that he texted him. Two-Face puts in his order as he tries to flip a coin for his additional orders. When Brainiac states that the Wi-Fi password does not work, Poison Ivy advises him to use the Wi-Fi in his brain since he is a super-computer. Brainiac explains to her that he has 3G and that his mother is using all the data, leaving him with no minutes. Grodd interacts with Lena, sympathizing her plight and suggesting that they should follow each other on Twitter. Grodd then talks to Adam about Lena and spring break. Weather Wizard replies to Grodd's text stating that he wants an Americano. Adam has Grodd tell him that they already left.

=== Superboy ===
Superman introduces his "clone" Superboy, to the Justice League, though it is implied that Superboy is actually Superman and Wonder Woman's illegitimate son.

=== Bat-Hound vs. Bane-Hound ===
Ace the Bat-Hound and a dog dressed like Bane re-enact a running joke from the last special.

=== Sexx Luthor ===
As Luthor talks to the Legion of Doom about a targeted energy pulse being sent to the Hall of Doom, Scarecrow sends something to Gorilla Grodd. He forwards it to Sinestro and Catwoman. Luthor catches the four in the act and asks what is so important. Scarecrow then proceeds to show him Luthor's act as "Sexx Luthor" from the Smallville High School Talent Show. Luthor destroys the laptop in front of Scarecrow.

=== Reverse Flash ===
Reverse-Flash introduces "Reverse Iris" to the Flash and Iris West.

=== Giving Bats a Ride ===
Batman and Green Lantern try to come up with a less emasculating way for Batman to enter the battlefield as the Justice League fights Chemo. When Green Lantern enters with Batman on a sailboat construct, Chemo is in awe as he says "I got to call my dad".

=== Worked to the Bone ===
When trying to get a vote from the Legion members, Black Manta states that they are being overworked. Luthor finds out that Lena escaped to spend time at the beach with her boyfriend. As Grodd states to Sinestro that Lena does what she wants, Luthor considers this an insubordination that will not stand. Scarecrow then sends Calvin off and to tell his sister that he loves her. Luthor orders Brainiac to tap into the grid in order to cross-reference the data of every airline in the country until Grodd views her Instagram vacation pictures with Toyman being impressed with the beach house in the picture. Luthor decides to fly the Legion to the beach to search for Lena as part of their "vacation". As Luthor orders the Legion of Doom to buckle up, Swamp Thing has been summoned by the nearby swamp animals where he claims that the Hall of Doom upsets the balance of the Green. When the Hall of Doom's rockets start to activate, Swamp Thing evacuates the nearby swamp animals as he is hit by the rocket fires.

=== Invisible Emergency ===
Green Arrow struggles to fly the invisible jet when Wonder Woman is knocked out.

=== Doctor Date ===
Doctor Fate's date takes a turn for the worse when an actual doctor is needed.

=== Cyborg's Poop ===
Cyborg shows how he goes to the bathroom.

=== Comic Book Deaths ===
At Green Arrow's funeral, Batman rants about how death works in the DC Universe that involves either making use of an alternate Earth's superhero, cloning them back to life, or being given a magical amulet. In the final scene, Green Arrow is alive, which surprises Ice.

=== Nerd at the Daily Planet ===
The Robot Chicken Nerd gets an internship at the Daily Planet. Jimmy Olsen talks about the signal watch he uses to call Superman when he is in trouble. When Jimmy falls out of the window, he forgets his signal watch. At the zoo, the Nerd gets grabbed by a gorilla as the Nerd sets off the signal watch as the gorilla eats it. Superman arrives and beheads the gorilla thinking that it ate Jimmy. The Nerd gets his first article titled "Superman Murders Gorilla" as he talks about it to Clark Kent.

=== She Likes Fish ===
Aquaman talks with his date's pet fish to see if she is a keeper.

=== Spring Break of Doom ===
The Legion arrives on the beach and uses the time to hang out and cause mischief. Sinestro and Mr. Freeze lie in the sun as Sinestro gets scorched. Joker compliments the beautiful day as Weather Wizard says "You're welcome". Clayface gives money to girls and interacts with a sand sculpture before they are hit by a high tide. Penguin, Scarecrow, Brainiac, Black Manta, and Riddler mistake the Justice League's private beach for a nude beach. As Joker runs behind Penguin, Luthor arrives scolding the villains for goofing off and where their clothes are. When Superman asks what kind of freak show he is running, Luthor states that he is looking for his daughter. Everyone present discovers that Lena and Superboy are dating, much to the dismay of Luthor and Superman who demand that Lena and Superboy never see each other again.

=== Starro Attacks ===
Before a fight between the two sides happens, Starro attacks the beach, forcing the heroes and villains to team up to stop him. Though Starro reconsiders his attack after seeing Lena and Superboy's love, he is defeated by Batman and Green Lantern's sailboat. Superman and Luthor agree that they cannot stop the power of love.

Later that evening, the Justice League and the Legion of Doom attend the wedding of Gorilla Grodd and Bizarro. Jimmy Olsen asks if this is how the second special ends. When Batman asks if he should be dead, Jimmy states that he got a magical amulet. Luthor reunites with his bandmates to perform as Sexx Luthor once more.

== Voice cast ==
- Seth Green as The Nerd, Batman, Robin, Aquaman, Penguin, Ace the Bat-Hound, Jimmy Olsen, Darkseid, Scarecrow, Toyman, Doctor Fate, Cyborg, Clayface, Black Manta, Killer Croc, Banehound, Various
- Alex Borstein as Wonder Woman
- Clancy Brown as Gorilla Grodd
- Hugh Davidson as Martian Manhunter, Seahorse Leader
- Zac Efron as Superboy, Brainiac
- Nathan Fillion as Green Lantern, Black Adam
- Clare Grant as Poison Ivy, Catwoman, Girl Scout
- Sarah Hyland as Lena Luthor
- Breckin Meyer as Superman, Bizarro
- Alfred Molina as Lex Luthor
- Paul Reubens as Riddler, Sunbather
- Giovanni Ribisi as Joker, Two-Face
- Matthew Senreich as Flash, Reverse-Flash, Weather Wizard, Waiter
- Kevin Shinick as Narrator, Captain Cold, Starro
- Tara Strong as Harley Quinn
- Zeb Wells as Sinestro, Green Arrow, Swamp Thing
