= JLA Adventures: Trapped in Time =

2014 film by Giancarlo Volpe

- DVD cover
- Directed by: Giancarlo Volpe
- Screenplay by: Michael Ryan
- Based on: Justice League by: Gardner Fox
- Produced by: Giancarlo Volpe
- Starring: Diedrich Bader; Laura Bailey; Dante Basco; Corey Burton; Grey DeLisle; Peter Jessop; Fred Tatasciore
- Edited by: Bruce A. King
- Music by: Frederik Wiedmann
- Production companies: Warner Bros. Animation; DC Entertainment; DR Movie (Animation services)
- Distributed by: Warner Home Video
- Release date: January 21, 2014
- Running time: 52 minutes
- Country: United States
- Language: English

JLA Adventures: Trapped in Time is a 2014 American animated superhero film featuring the Justice League of America. It was first released on January 21, 2014 on DVD, and features Diedrich Bader, Travis Willingham, and Kevin Michael Richardson, reprising their roles as Batman, Gorilla Grodd, and Black Manta respectively.

== Plot ==
In the present day, Lex Luthor and his Legion of Doom try to use cryogenic rays from orbital satellites to expand the Earth's polar ice caps, reducing sea levels and creating new islands they intend to rule. Superman and the Justice League confront the Legion, ultimately destroying the satellites. Refusing to accept defeat, Captain Cold overloads the remaining satellite, which falls to Earth and freezes Luthor, who is believed dead.

In the future of the 31st century, teenage superheroes-in-training Dawnstar and Karate Kid are visiting a museum dedicated to the League's exploits. They accidentally release Luthor, who has been in suspended animation following his battle with the League. Luthor explores the museum, discovers Superman's secret identity, and locates an ancient item called the Eternity Glass, which can manipulate time and space. Taking Captain Cold's weapon, he freezes Dawnstar and Karate Kid. He then releases Time Trapper from the Eternity Glass, allowing him to return to the present. The young heroes break free and follow.

Resuming control of the Legion, Luthor instructs Time Trapper to send his forces back in time to prevent Jonathan and Martha Kent from adopting Kal-El in Smallville. The young heroes enlist the League to stop them, and travel to the Hall of Justice in Washington, D.C. After a misunderstanding, they explain their story and verify it through Wonder Woman's Lasso of Truth. Flash, Aquaman, and Cyborg travel into the past to prevent Bizarro, Toyman, Cheetah, and Solomon Grundy from sending Kal-El back into space, while Superman and the rest of the League attempt to stall Luthor's Legion in the present.

Despite the League's efforts, the Legion sends Kal-El's ship away from Earth, creating a temporal paradox that erases the present League. In the League's absence, the Legion pillages the world and leaves Washington D.C. in ruins. Unwilling to risk being erased from existence, Dawnstar and Karate Kid retreat, realizing that they can induce their own paradox by ensuring that Luthor never obtained the Eternity Glass. They free his past self from the ice, but Time Trapper is immune to the paradox because he exists outside of time, and with Luthor freed, he can now do as he pleases because he is no longer his master.

The Time Trapper banishes the future Luthor from existence and tries to remake the world in his image. Superman and the League, who exist again because of the latter's absence, confront the villain. Time Trapper is too powerful for the League to fight. Karate Kid discovers that Time Trapper is composed of dark matter and realizes that only Dawnstar's light-based powers can defeat him. Dawnstar charges Time Trapper and the League defeat him, reverting the Eternity Glass, which imprisons Time Trapper once more. The League thanks the young heroes and offers them the opportunity to stay, but they refuse and return to their own time. Luthor is sent to Blackgate Penitentiary, with Gorilla Grodd assuming control of the Legion of Doom. After returning to their own time, Karate Kid and Dawnstar discover that a statue of Luthor has replaced a statue of Superman. Believing they have altered history, they immediately return to the 21st century to help the League once more.

== Cast ==
- Diedrich Bader as Batman
- Laura Bailey as Dawnstar
- Dante Basco as Karate Kid
- Corey Burton as Time Trapper, Captain Cold
- Grey DeLisle as Wonder Woman, Superbaby
- Peter Jessop as Superman
- Fred Tatasciore as Lex Luthor
- Jack DeSena as Robin
- Michael Donovan as Bizarro
- Tom Gibis as Toyman, Jonathan Kent
- Erica Luttrell as Cheetah, Martha Kent
- Liam O'Brien as Aquaman, Batwing Computer
- Kevin Michael Richardson as Black Manta, Solomon Grundy
- Jason Spisak as The Flash, Taxi Driver
- Avery Waddell as Cyborg
- Travis Willingham as Gorilla Grodd

== Release ==
The film was first released on DVD in Region 1 in the US exclusively at Target stores on January 21, 2014. The DVD, and digital download, was later available generally on May 20 the same year.

== Reception ==
Chris Sims of ComicsAlliance wrote: "Trapped In Time might not have the pedigree of being inspired by a best-selling comic, but it's exactly the kind of project DC's animated movies should be focusing on". Cliff Wheatley from IGN gave the film 8/10, saying that "JLA Adventures: Trapped in Time is a call back to the glory days of DC's animated offerings. It might not have the refined animation of the Bruce Timm era, but it's certainly a ton of fun despite its flaws".
