= Lego DC Comics Super Heroes: Aquaman – Rage of Atlantis =

2018 animated superhero film

- Blu-ray cover
- Directed by: Matt Peters
- Written by: Jim Krieg; Jeremy Adams
- Based on: Aquaman by: Mort Weisinger; Paul Norris
- Produced by: Sam Register; Jason Cosler; Robert Fewkes; Jill Wilfert
- Starring: Dee Bradley Baker; Troy Baker; Grey Griffin; Nolan North
- Music by: Tim Kelly
- Production companies: The Lego Group; DC Entertainment; Warner Bros. Animation
- Distributed by: Warner Bros. Home Entertainment
- Release dates: July 22, 2018 (San Diego Comic-Con); July 31, 2018 (Blu-ray, DVD, digital)
- Running time: 77 minutes
- Countries: United States; Denmark
- Language: English

Lego DC Comics Super Heroes: Aquaman – Rage of Atlantis is a 2018 American animated superhero comedy film, based on the DC Comics and Lego brands featuring the character Aquaman. The film features the voices of Dee Bradley Baker, Troy Baker, Grey Griffin, and Nolan North. Directed by Matt Peters, written by Jim Krieg and Jeremy Adams, and produced by DC Entertainment, the Lego Group, and Warner Bros. Animation, it is the eighth film in the Lego DC Comics Super Heroes series.

Lego DC Comics Super Heroes: Aquaman – Rage of Atlantis premiered at San Diego Comic-Con on July 22, 2018, and was released by Warner Bros. Home Entertainment on Blu-ray, DVD, and digital on July 31, 2018. The film received mixed reviews, with praise for the animation but criticism for the consumerism.

== Plot ==
Newcomer Jessica Cruz and the Justice League confront Lobo at Dread Lake, but fail to stop him from stealing a glowing blue orb. Wanting to lighten the mood, Aquaman invites the League to a feast in Atlantis honoring his anniversary as king. At Atlantis, there is a statue of Poseidon holding a trident. Legend says that whoever manages to remove the trident is the rightful ruler of Atlantis. Batman applies a spray to himself and his friends that will temporarily let them breathe underwater. During the feast, Aquaman's half-brother, Ocean Master gathers the inhabitants of Atlantis. The city is engulfed in a red light that corrupts the inhabitants, with the League being protected by a force field created by Jessica. Ocean Master reveals a law about how only a pure-blooded Atlantean can be king. Since Aquaman's father was human, he reluctantly gives up the crown to Ocean Master.

Angry at Aquaman for giving up the crown without thinking about how it would affect her, his wife Mera leaves. Now in control, Ocean Master introduces his subjects to his new advisor, Red Lantern Corps leader, Atrocitus, and demands the destruction of the League. Attempting to escape the Atlanteans, Aquaman and the League escape through a device called the Sea Gate that opens portals to other oceanic planets. However, Jessica fails to go through the portal before it closes.

The Sea Gate sends the League to a planet with a factory of Red Lantern vehicles and robots. Noticing that the planet's end of the gateway is powered by the orb that Lobo stole, the League realize that Atrocitus plans to send his forces to Earth and have the Atlanteans invade the surface world. After escaping the factory, the League learns that the planet has not had water ever since Atrocitus drained it. Fearing that Earth will suffer a similar fate, the League become determined to return home. Encountering Lobo, they learn that Ocean Master hired him to steal the orb and request his assistance to take them back to the factory and return to Earth in exchange for returning his space dolphin, Fishy, to him.

Back on Earth, Jessica is rescued by Mera, who succumbs to the Red Lanterns' corruption. After escaping, Jessica makes it to a seaside fair in Star City where the Atlantean invasion begins. Upon realizing that the entire world is watching her on the news, Jessica flees, but she works up the courage to return when she sees Mera attempting to corrupt Batgirl and Robin. Jessica defeats Mera and restores her to normal.

Elsewhere, the League attempt to return to Earth. They succeed in shutting down the Red Lantern factory and the Sea Gate, but not before Fishy, Red Lantern Corps, member, Dex-Starr, and Red Lantern drones go through it. Upset about their failure, Lobo leaves. The League temporarily reopen the Sea Gate and return to Earth, but are captured by Ocean Master and Atrocitus. However, Atrocitus reveals that he has been using Ocean Master. After imprisoning Ocean Master with the League, Atrocitus reveals that he plans to use a straw-like weapon called the Submerged Limitless Underwater Rapid Pump (S.L.U.R.P.) to drain Earth's water.

Seeing the error of his ways, Ocean Master decides to help the League defeat Atrocitus. They use a key of phytoplankton that Aquaman summoned to escape and Ocean Master uses his scepter's magic to protect them from the Red Lantern's light. Aquaman manages to remove the Poseidon statue's trident. He uses it to defeat Atrocitus and destroy the Red Lantern power battery, undoing the effects of its light. After Aquaman reconciles with Mera, the League destroys S.L.U.R.P. with Lobo's assistance.

After Superman returns the water that was already drained to Earth, Ocean Master confesses that the law that dethroned Aquaman is actually fake. Ocean Master points out that even if it was real, Aquaman is still worthy to rule Atlantis because he was able to claim the trident, allowing him to become king again. Lobo captures Atrocitus and Dex-Starr, who goes to Oa to collect a bounty that was placed on them. While the League celebrate their victory over Atrocitus, Cyborg's mobile Trouble Alert goes off, alerting the League that Gorilla Grodd is attacking Kathmandu and forcing them into action again.

== Voice cast ==
Voice actor	Character
Dee Bradley Baker	Aquaman, Dex-Starr
Troy Baker	Batman
Eric Bauza	Jimmy Olsen
Trevor Devall	Ocean Master
Susan Eisenberg	Mera
Jonathan Adams	Atrocitus
Grey Griffin	Wonder Woman, Lois Lane, Ring
Scott Menville	Robin / Damian Wayne
Cristina Milizia	Green Lantern / Jessica Cruz
Nolan North	Superman
Khary Payton	Cyborg
Alyson Stoner	Batgirl / Barbara Gordon
Fred Tatasciore	Lobo

== Reception ==
Renee Longstreet for Common Sense Media gave the film a two out of five star rating and commented, saying "Some light but relatable references to self-confidence play a small part in this tale, but the abundance of loud, busy battle sequences overpower the message, as well as some funny comic bits. While the story seems to be simple – good guys fight bad guys who threaten the planet – there are an awful lot of villains on the scene with plenty of evil motivations to go around, so younger kids may not be able to follow all the ins and outs of the plot. That hardly matters when they're engaged by the dozens of surprises emerging from Batman's utility belt and the smash, bang, boom of combat. On the plus side, the creative team smartly utilizes the solid voice performances of the actors who "appear" in the other animated versions, as well as this offering. It's notable that the release of Lego DC Comics Super Heroes: Aquaman – Rage of Atlantis comes only months before the big screen Aquaman is set to open. It couldn't be purposeful advance marketing for kids, could it?"

== See also ==
- List of underwater science fiction works
