= Timeline of DC Comics (1940s) =

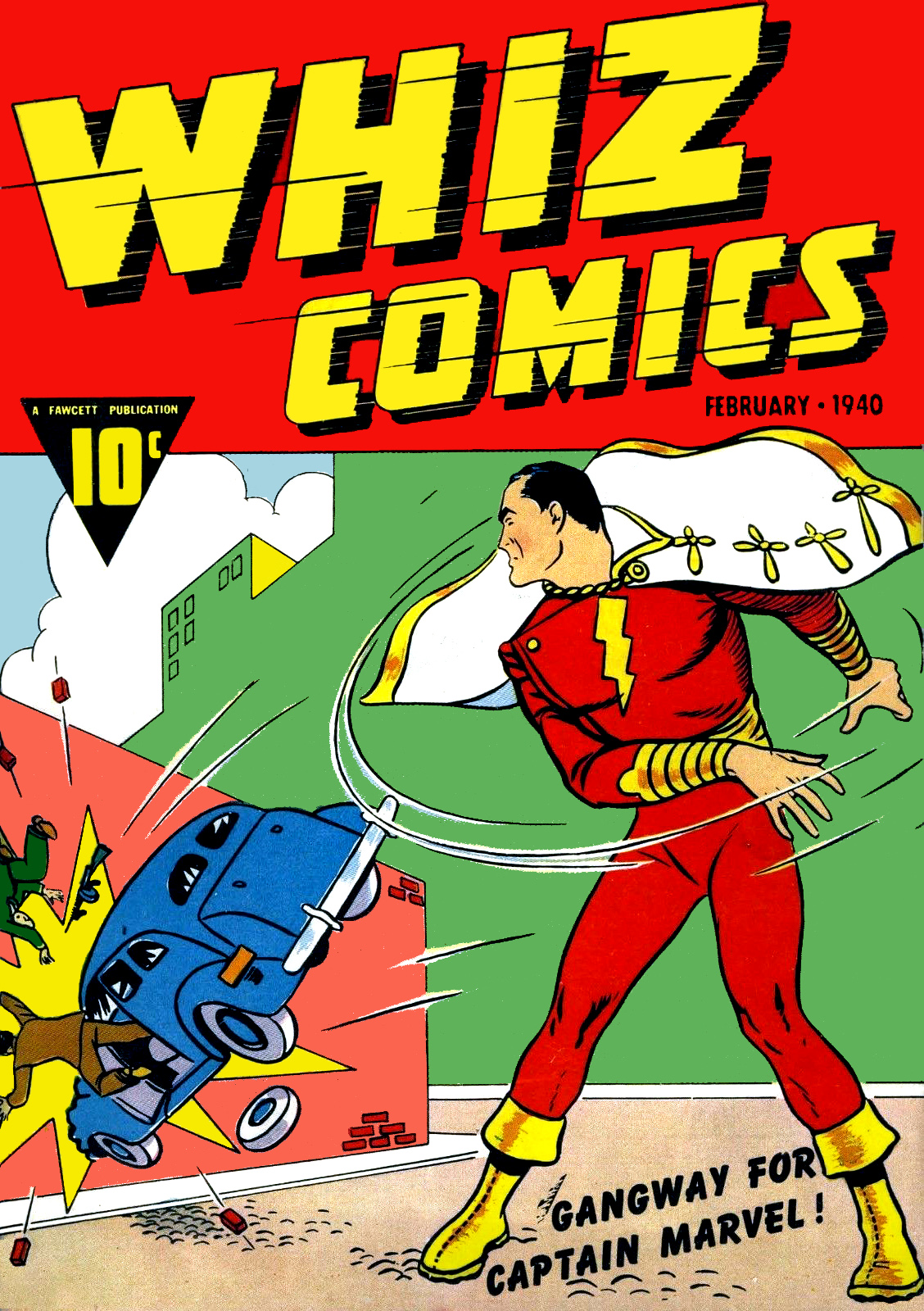
First appearance of Fawcett's Captain Marvel. A character who would rival DC's flagship character Superman in the 1940s until being acquired by DC in the decades to come.

The 1940s were an essential time for DC Comics. Both National Comics Publications and All-American Publications would introduce many new featured superheroes in American comic books in superhero comics anthology tales like More Fun Comics, Adventure Comics, Detective Comics, Action Comics, All-American Comics, Superman, Flash Comics, Batman, All Star Comics, World's Finest Comics, All-Flash, Star Spangled Comics, Green Lantern, Leading Comics, Sensation Comics, Wonder Woman, Comic Cavalcade and Superboy that would be a staple for the comic book company. Examples of the superheroes include the Flash, Hawkman and Hawkgirl, Johnny Thunder and Thunderbolt, Spectre, Hourman, Robin, Doctor Fate, Congo Bill, Green Lantern, Atom, Manhunter, Doctor Mid-Nite, Sargon the Sorcerer, Starman, Johnny Quick, the Shining Knight, the Star-Spangled Kid and Stripesy, Tarantula, Vigilante, Green Arrow and Speedy, Aquaman, Wonder Woman, Sandy, the Golden Boy, Mister Terrific, Wildcat, Air Wave, Guardian, Robotman, TNT and Dan the Dyna-Mite, Liberty Belle, Superboy and Black Canary. These characters would later crossover in superhero team titles in the 1940s such as the Justice Society of America and the Seven Soldiers of Victory helping pave a way to a shared universe of the publication company. Other used featured characters outside of superheroes included kid titular heroes like the Newsboy Legion and the Boy Commandos. Later Western heroes would be used such as Johnny Thunder, Nighthawk and Pow Wow Smith.

Quality Comics would produce comics titles such as Feature Comics, Smash Comics, Crack Comics, Hit Comics, National Comics, Military Comics and Police Comics and introduce heroes like Black Condor, Uncle Sam, Ray, Blackhawk, Miss America, Firebrand, Plastic Man, Phantom Lady and the Human Bomb. Also the character Spirit would be introduced in comic strips until being later acquired by Quality.

Fawcett Comics had popular mainstay titles like Whiz Comics, Master Comics, Wow Comics and Captain Marvel Adventures that featured renown superheroes like Captain Marvel, Ibis the Invincible, Spy Smasher, Bulletman and Bulletgirl, Mr. Scarlet and Pinky the Whiz Kid, Captain Marvel Jr. and Mary Marvel. The superhero team Marvel Family would also be formed.

Another introduced comic series was Fox Feature Syndicate's Mystery Men Comics and Blue Beetle.

More supporting characters of Superman (or Superboy stories) were introduced like Perry White alongside supervillain rogues Lex Luthor, Prankster, Toyman and Mister Mxyzptlk. The first name of Superwoman and the object Kryptonite was also introduced along with the city of Smallville. Batman and Robin stories included supporting characters like Alfred Pennyworth and Vicki Vale alongside supervillain rogues like Hugo Strange, Tony Zucco, Joker, Catwoman, Clayface, Scarecrow, Penguin, Two-Face, Sal Maroni, Mad Hatter and Riddler. Other fictional elements include the locations of Gotham City and Batcave along with the iconic Bat-Signal and also the Batboat. Flash comics would introduce supervillain enemies like Shade, Rag Doll, Thinker, Turtle, Rose and Thorn, Fiddler, an original Star Sapphire and original Reverse-Flash. Hawkman comics included the supervillain rogue, Gentleman Ghost. Captain Marvel or Marvel Family related comics introduced supporting characters like Shazam, Uncle Marvel and Tawky Tawny and supervillain rogues Seven Deadly Enemies of Man, Doctor Sivana, Captain Nazi, Ibac, Sabbac, Mister Mind and the Monster Society of Evil, Black Adam and Mister Atom. Major Captain Marvel locations include the Rock of Eternity. The Spectre comics included the name of Jim Corrigan. The Green Lantern comics included popular supervillains like Vandal Savage, Gambler, Solomon Grundy, Sportsmaster, Harlequin and Icicle. The Justice Society of America comics introduced supervillains like Brainwave, Wizard, Per Degaton and Psycho-Pirate and also introduced DC's original supervillain team, the Injustice Society. Starman comics introduced the supervillain, Mist. Green Arrow comics debuted the company Queen Industries. The Wonder Woman comics (or Wonder Girl) includes supporting characters such as Steve Trevor, Hippolyta, Etta Candy, and Zeus alongside supervillain rogues like Doctor Poison, Paula von Gunther, Ares, Doctor Psycho, Cheetah, Giganta, Queen Clea and Circe. Also debuted was the supervillain team, Villainy Inc. Other Races and factions / species include the Amazons. Fictional devices like the Wonder Woman's bracelets, the Invisible plane, the Lasso of Truth were debuted and the major location called Themysciria was also introduced. The Wildcat comics introduced the supervillain, Paula Brooks. The Black Canary comics introduced supporting character, Larry Lance. Other major locations introduced by DC include the Suicide Slum.

Media adaptions of DC and Fawcett ranged from radio drama like The Adventures of Superman to serial films in live-action like the Adventures of Captain Marvel, Batman, Superman and Batman and Robin and also in animation the Superman shorts starting with Superman and also the comic strip, Batman.

Superhero comics declined in popularity after the end of World War II around the late 1940s. DC shifted their focus on other genres such as Western comics and Teen humor comics outside of Superman, Batman and Wonder Woman related titles.

== 1940 ==
- January / Winter - Blue Beetle series was debuted by Fox Feature Syndicate. Flash Comics series debuts. The original Flash was debuted by Gardner Fox and Harry Lambert. The original Hawkman and the original Hawkgirl was debuted by Gardner Fox and Dennis Neville. The characters Johnny Thunder and the Thunderbolt are debuted by John Whentworth and Stan Aschmeier.
- February - Fawcett Comics releases Whiz Comics series. The characters Captain Marvel, Shazam, Seven Deadly Enemies of Man and Doctor Sivana make their debut and are created by Bill Parker and C.C. Beck. The first Ibis the Invincible is debuted by Tad Williams and Phil Winslade. The first Spy Smasher debuted by C.C. Beck and Bill Parker. The Spectre is debuted by Jerry Siegel and Bernard Baily. The character Hugo Strange is debuted by Bill Finger and Bob Kane. The Adventures of Superman radio series debuted. The character Perry White is debuted by George Putnam Ludlam.
- March - The first Hourman is debuted by Ken Fitch and Bernard Bailey. Master Comics debuted by Fawcett Comics.
- April - The character Luthor is debuted by Jerry Siegel and Joe Shuster. The character Dick Grayson is debuted (as the first Robin) by Bill Finger, Bob Kane and Jerry Robinson, along with Robin's origin of the Robin' parents being killed by Tony Zucco. Batman series was released. The character Joker was debuted by Bob Kane, Bill Finger and Jerry Robinson. The character Catwoman was debuted by Bill Finger and Bob Kane. A Detective Comics, Inc. v. Bruns Publications, Inc. lawsuit was established on April 29, 1940.
- May - Crack Comics series is debuted by Quality Comics. The original Black Condor is debuted by Will Eisner and Lou Fine. The original Doctor Fate was debuted by Gardner Fox and Howard Sherman. The characters Bulletman and Susan Kent (who later becomes Bulletgirl) were debuted by Bill Parker and John Smalle.
- June - The character Congo Bill was debuted by Whitney Ellsworth and George Papp. The original Clayface was debuted by Bill Finger and Bob Kane. The character Spirit was debuted by Will Eisner which DC now owns.
- July - The series Hit Comics was debuted by Quality Comics. National Comics series debuts by Quality Comics. The character Uncle Sam is debuted by Will Eisner. The first Green Lantern is debuted by Martin Nodell. All Star Comics series is debuted.
- October - The first Ray is debuted by Lou Fine. The first Atom is debuted by Bill O'Connor and Bill Flinton.
- November - The character Quicksilver is debuted by Jack Cole and Chuck Mazoujian.
- December - The team Justice Society of America is debuted by Gardner Fox and Sheldon Mayer. This helped pave the way for a crossover shared universe.
- Winter - Wow Comics, later retitled Real Hero Western and then Real Hero Westerns series is debuted by Fawcett Comics. The character Mr. Scarlet is debuted by France Herron and Jack Kirby.

== 1941 ==
- January - The character Midnight was debuted by Jack Cole. The first Manhunter is debuted by Jack Kirby. Captain Marvel Adventures was debuted by Fawcett Comics.
- Winter / February - Gotham City takes the place of real life city New York City by Bill Finger, and Bob Kane. The Bat-Signal was debuted.
- March - Adventures of Captain Marvel film serial is released.
- Spring - World's Best Comics, later retitled World's Finest Comics series is debuted.
- April - The first Doctor Mid-Nite is debuted by Charles Reizenstein and Stanley Josephs Aschmeier. The first Starman is debuted by Gardner Fox and Jack Burnley.
- May - The first Sargon the Sorcerer debuts by John B. Wentworth and Howard Purcell.
- June - The character Doiby Dickles was debuted by Bill Finger and Irwin Hasen.
- Summer - All-Flash Quarterly, later retitled All-Flash series was debuted.
- August - Military Comics, later retitled Modern Comics series was debuted by Quality Comics. The character Blackhawk was debuted by Chuck Cuidera, Bob Powell and Bill Eisner. Miss America was debuted by Elmer Wexler. Police Comics title is debuted by Quality Comics. The first Firebrand is debuted by S.M. Iger and Reed Crandall. The character Plastic Man is debuted by Jack Cole. The first Phantom Lady is debuted by the Eisner & Iger Studio and Arthur Peddy. The original Human Bomb is debuted by Paul Gustavson.
- September - The character Johnny Quick is debuted by Mort Weisinger. The first Shining Knight was debuted by Craig Flessel. The characters Lieutenant Marvels were debuted by C.C. Beck. The first of the Superman theatrical animated short series would be released.
- October / Autumn - Star Spangled Comics series is debuted. The first Star-Spangled Kid along with Stripesy is debuted by Jerry Siegel and Hal Sherman. The first Tarantula was debuted by Mort Weisinger. The character Scarecrow is debuted by Bill Finger, Bob Kane and Jerry Robinson. The first Mist was debuted by Gardner Fox. The first Green Lantern series is debuted.
- November - The character Vigilante was debuted by Mort Weisinger and Mort Meskin. The characters Green Arrow and the first Speedy is debuted by Mort Weisinger and George Papp. The character Aquaman is debuted by Mort Weisinger and Paul Norris. The second Superman animated short was debuted.
- December / Winter - The character Pinky the Whiz Kid was debuted by Otto Binder and Jack Binder. (Or in January 1942) The characters Wonder Woman, Steve Trevor and Hippolyta was debuted by William Moulton Marston and H. G. Peter. Other iconic debuts include the Bracelets of Submission, Themyscira and Amazons. The character Sandy the Golden Boy was debuted by Mort Weisinger and Paul Norris. The character Penguin is debuted by Bill Finger and Bob Kane. The character Captain Nazi was debuted by William Woolfolk and Mac Raboy. The character Captain Marvel Jr. was debuted by France Herron and Mac Raboy. Leading Comics, later retitled Leading Screen Comics series was debuted. The team Seven Soldiers of Victory is debuted by Mort Weisinger and Mort Meskin.

== 1942 ==
- January - Sensation Comics series was debuted. The Invisible plane was debuted by William Moulton Marston and H. G. Peter. The first Mister Terrific was debuted by Charles Reizenstein and Hal Sharp. The original Wildcat was debuted by Bill Finger and Irwin Hasen. The third Superman animated short was debuted.
- February - The first Doctor Poison along with Etta Candy were debuted by William Moulton Marston and Harry G. Peter. The first Air Wave was debuted by Murray Boltinoff, Mort Weisinger and Harris Levey. The fourth Superman animated short was debuted.
- March - The character Ibac was debuted by Otto Binder and C.C Beck. The fifth Superman animated short was debuted.
- April - The characters Newsboy Legion and the first Guardian was debuted by Joe Simon and Jack Kirby. The character Robotman was debuted by Jerry Siegel and Leo Nowak. The characters TNT and Dan the Dyna-Mite are debuted by Mort Weisinger and Hal Sharp. The character Paula von Gunther was debuted by William Moulton Marston and Harry G. Peter. Spy Smasher film serial was released. The sixth Superman animated short was debuted.
- May - The seventh of the Superman theatrical animated short series would be released.
- June - The Lasso of Truth was debuted by William Moulton Marston and H. G. Peter. The characters Boy Commandos were debuted by Jack Kirby and Joe Simon. The eighth of the Superman theatrical animated short series would be released.
- Summer - The Wonder Woman series was debuted. The character Ares was debuted by William Moulton Marston.
- August / September - The Batcave was debuted. The character Prankster was debuted by Jerry Siegel and John Sikela. The character Two-Face (along with Sal Maroni) was debuted by Bill Finger and Bob Kane. The Hop Harrigan radio series would be released. The ninth of the Superman theatrical animated short series would be released. The character Shade was debuted by Gardner Fox and Hal Sharp. The tenth of the Superman theatrical animated short series would be released.
- October - The eleventh of the Superman theatrical animated short series would be released.
- November - The character Woozy Winks was debuted by Jack Cole. The twelfth of the Superman theatrical animated short series would be released.
- December / Winter - The character Kid Eternity was debuted by Otto Binder and Sheldon Moldoff. The character Rag Doll was debuted by Gardner Fox and Lou Ferstadt. The character Hoppy the Marvel Bunny was debuted by Chad Grothkopf. The first Liberty Belle was debuted by Don Cameron and Chuck Winter. The character Mary Marvel was debuted by Otto Binder and Mark Swayze. Comic Cavalcade series was debuted. The thirteenth of the Superman theatrical animated short series would be released.

== 1943 ==
- January - The character Captain Triumph is debuted by Alfred Andriola.
- February - The first Brainwave was debuted by Gardner Fox and Joe Gallagher. The first Sabbac is debuted by Otto Binder and Al Carreno. The fourteenth of the Superman theatrical animated short series would be released. The team Monster Society of Evil debuted along with the character Mister Mind by Otto Binder and C.C Beck.
- March - The fifteenth of the Superman theatrical animated short series would be released.
- April - The character Alfred Beagle was debuted by Bob Cameron and Bob Kane.
- May - The first usage of the name Superwoman was debuted by Jerry Siegel and George Roussos. The sixteenth of the Superman theatrical animated short series would be released.
- June / July - The object Kryptonite first appeared publicly in radio. The character Doctor Psycho was debuted by William Moulton Marston and H. G. Peter. Batman film serial was released. The seventeenth of the Superman theatrical animated short series would be released.
- September- The first Toyman is debuted by Don Cameron and Ed Dobrotka.
- Autumn / October - The first Cheetah was debuted by William Moulton Marston and H. G. Peter. The character Uncle Marvel is debuted by Otto Binder and Mark Swayze. The first Thinker is debuted by Gardner Fox and E.E. Hibbard. A Batman comic strip was debuted.
- Winter - The character Vandal Savage was debuted by Alfred Bester and Martin Nodell.

== 1944 ==
- February / Spring - The character Mister Mxyzptlk that was debuted by Jerry Siegel and Joe Shuster would see print in comic strips before his actual first printed appearance. The character Queen Clea was debuted by William Moulton Marston.
- May / June - DC's representation of the mythological god Zeus was debuted by George Pérez.
- Summer - The character Giganta was debuted by William Moulton Marston. The character Gambler was debuted by Henry Kuttner and Martin Nodell.
- October - The character Solomon Grundy was debuted by Alfred Bester and Paul Reinman.
- December - The first Psycho-Pirate was debuted by Gardner Fox and Joe Gallagher.

== 1945 ==
- January / February - Jerry Siegel, Joe Shuster and Don Cameron's Superboy first appears.
- December - The character Black Adam the location Rock of Eternity was debuted by Otto Binder and C.C. Beck.
- Winter - The first Turtle was debuted by Gardner Fox and Martin Nyadell.

== 1946 ==
- March / April / Other - Real Fact Comics series was debuted. Hop Harrigan film serial was debuted. The Batboat was debuted by David Clough Cameron and Win Mortimer.

== 1947 ==
- January / February - The character Tommy Tomorrow was debuted by Jack Schiff, George Kashdan, Bernie Breslauer, Virgil Finlay and Howard Sherman.
- April - The character Wizard was debuted by Gardner Fox and Irwin Hasen.
- May / June / July - The first Sportsmaster was debuted by John Broome and Irwin Hasen. The name Wonder Girl was debuted. The Vigilante film serial was debuted. The character Tomahawk was debuted by Joe Samachson and Edmund Good. The character Per Degaton was debuted by John Brown and Irwin Hasen.
- August - The first Black Canary was debuted by Robert Kanigher and Carmine Infantino. Paula Brooks was debuted by Mort Meskin and Roy Thomas.
- September - The first Harlequin was debuted by Robert Kanigher and Irwin Hasen.
- October - The character Gentleman Ghost was debuted by Robert Kanigher and Joe Kubert. The first Icicle was debuted by Robert Kanigher and Irwin Hasen. The team Injustice Society was debuted by Sheldon Mayer and Bob Kanigher.
- November - The first Rose / Thorn was debuted by John Broome and Carmine Infantino. The character Mister Atom is debuted by Otto Binder and C.C. Beck.
- December - The character Tawky Tawny was debuted by Otto Binder and C.C. Beck. The first Star Sapphire was debuted by Robert Kanigher and Lee Elias. (Or January 1938) The first Fiddler was debuted by Robert Kanigher and Lee Elias. (Or January 1938)

== 1948 ==
- January / February / March / April - Western Comics series was debuted. Superman film serial was released. The character Larry Lance was debuted by Robert Kanigher and Carmine Infantino. Leave It to Binky series was debuted. The team Villainy Inc. was debuted by William Moulton Morston and Harry G. Peter.
- June - The character Merry was debuted by Otto Binder and Win Mortimer.
- August - The character Johnny Thunder was debuted by Alex Toth and Robert Kanigher.
- September / October - The character Nighthawk was debuted by Joe Millard and Charles Paris. The characters Vicki Vale and Mad Hatter were debuted by Bob Kane, Bill Finger and Lew Sayre Schwartz. The character Riddler was debuted by Bill Finger and Dick Sprang. Congo Bill serial was released.

== 1949 ==
- February - The first Reverse-Flash was debuted by John Broome and Joe Kubert.
- March / April - The series Superboy was debuted.
- May / June - The fictional town of Smallville was debuted. Batman and Robin serial was debuted.
- August / September / October - The series Heart Throbs was debuted by Quality Comics. The series Girls' Love Stories was debuted. The character Pow Wow Smith was debuted by Don Cameron and Carmine Infantino. The character Circe was debuted by Robert Kanigher and Harry G. Peter.

== See also ==
- Golden Age of Comic Books
