= List of films based on DC Comics publications =

DC Studios logo used since 2024

DC Comics is one of the largest and oldest American comic book publishers. It produces material featuring numerous well-known superhero characters, including Superman, Batman, Wonder Woman, Green Lantern, The Flash, Aquaman, and Green Arrow. Most of this material takes place in a shared fictional universe, which also features teams such as the Justice League, the Suicide Squad, and the Teen Titans.

Film adaptations based on DC Comics properties have included serials, live action and animated feature films, direct-to-video releases, television films, and documentary films.

== Live-action films ==
=== Feature films ===
Live-action feature films produced by DC Studios are set within the DC Universe (DCU) unless otherwise noted.

Year	Title	Studio(s)	Notes
1951	Superman and the Mole Men	Lippert Pictures	First feature film based on a DC Comics character. Served as a backdoor pilot for the 1950s Adventures of Superman television series and was later split into a two-parter episode to close off the series' first season.
1966	Batman	20th Century Fox/Greenlawn Productions	Related to the 1960s Batman television series.
1978	Superman	Dovemead Film Export A.G./International Film Productions	Won 1 Special Oscar, nominated for 3 more.
1980	Superman II	Dovemead Film Export A.G./International Film Productions	Director's cut titled Superman II: The Richard Donner Cut was released on home video in 2006.
1982	Swamp Thing	Embassy Pictures	
1983	Superman III	Cantharus Productions N.V./Dovemead Films	
1984	Supergirl	Artistry Ltd/Cantharus Productions/Pueblo Film Group	Spin-off to the 1978 Superman film.
1987	Superman IV: The Quest for Peace	Golan-Globus/Cannon Films	
1989	The Return of Swamp Thing	Lightyear Entertainment	
1989	Batman	Warner Bros./PolyGram Filmed Entertainment	Won 1 Oscar.
1992	Batman Returns	Warner Bros./PolyGram Filmed Entertainment	Nominated for 2 Oscars.
1995	Batman Forever	Warner Bros./PolyGram Filmed Entertainment	Nominated for 3 Oscars.
1997	Batman & Robin	Warner Bros./PolyGram Filmed Entertainment	
1997	Steel	Warner Bros./Quincy-David Salzman Entertainment	
2004	Catwoman	Warner Bros./Village Roadshow Pictures/Di Novi Pictures/Frantic Films/Maple Shade Films	Not directly based on the character of the same name.
2005	Constantine	Warner Bros./Village Roadshow Pictures/The Donners' Company/Batfilm Productions/3 Arts Entertainment	Loosely based on the Hellblazer comic.
2005	Batman Begins	Warner Bros./DC Comics/Legendary Pictures/Syncopy Inc./Patalex III Productions	Nominated for 1 Oscar.
2006	Superman Returns	Warner Bros./DC Comics/Legendary Pictures/Bad Hat Harry Productions	Alternate trilogy conclusion only to Superman and Superman II. Nominated for 1 Oscar.
2008	The Dark Knight	Warner Bros./DC Comics/Legendary Pictures/Syncopy Inc.	Won 2 Oscars, nominated for 6 more.
2009	Watchmen	Warner Bros./Paramount Pictures/DC Comics/Legendary Pictures/Lawrence Gordon Productions/Cruel and Unusual Films	Based on the limited series by Alan Moore and Dave Gibbons.
2010	Jonah Hex	Warner Bros./DC Entertainment/Legendary Pictures/Weed Road Pictures	Loosely based on the character of the same name.
2011	Green Lantern	Warner Bros./DC Entertainment/De Line Pictures	
2012	The Dark Knight Rises	Warner Bros./DC Entertainment/Legendary Pictures/Syncopy Inc.	
2013	Man of Steel	Warner Bros./DC Entertainment/Legendary Pictures/Cruel and Unusual Films/Syncopy Inc.	Set in the DC Extended Universe (DCEU).
2016	Batman v Superman: Dawn of Justice	Warner Bros./DC Entertainment/RatPac Entertainment/Cruel and Unusual Films/Atlas Entertainment	Set in the DCEU. An R-rated extended version, the Ultimate Edition, was released on home video the same year.
2016	Suicide Squad	Warner Bros./DC Films/RatPac Entertainment/Atlas Entertainment	Set in the DCEU. Won 1 Oscar.
2017	Wonder Woman	Warner Bros./DC Films/RatPac Entertainment/Atlas Entertainment/Cruel and Unusual Films/Tencent Pictures/Wanda Media	Set in the DCEU.
2017	Justice League	Warner Bros./DC Films/RatPac Entertainment/Atlas Entertainment/Cruel and Unusual Films	Set in the DCEU. Director's cut of Justice League was released on HBO Max in 2021.
2018	Aquaman	Warner Bros./DC Films/The Safran Company	Set in the DCEU.
2019	Shazam!	New Line Cinema/DC Films/The Safran Company/Mad Ghost Productions	Set in the DCEU.
2019	Joker	Warner Bros./DC Films/Village Roadshow Pictures/Bron Creative/Joint Effort Productions	Won 2 Oscars, nominated for 9 more.
2020	Birds of Prey	Warner Bros./DC Films/LuckyChap Entertainment/Kroll & Co. Entertainment/Clubhouse Pictures	Set in the DCEU.
2020	Wonder Woman 1984	Warner Bros./DC Films/The Stone Quarry/Mad Ghost Productions/Atlas Entertainment	Set in the DCEU. Released simultaneously in theaters and on HBO Max in the United States.
2021	The Suicide Squad	Warner Bros./DC Films/Atlas Entertainment/The Safran Company	Set in the DCEU.
2022	The Batman	Warner Bros./DC Films/6th & Idaho Productions/Dylan Clark Productions	Nominated for 3 Oscars.
2022	Batgirl	Warner Bros./DC Films/Burr! Productions	Set in the DCEU. Only shown in exclusive screenings in August 2022. The film was set to be released on HBO Max, before it was shelved in 2022.
2022	Black Adam	New Line Cinema/DC Films/Seven Bucks Productions/FlynnPictureCo.	Set in the DCEU.
2023	Shazam! Fury of the Gods	New Line Cinema/DC Films/The Safran Company/Mad Ghost Productions	Set in the DCEU.
2023	The Flash	Warner Bros./DC Films/The Disco Factory/Double Dream	Set in the DCEU.
2023	Blue Beetle	Warner Bros./DC Films/S&K Pictures/The Safran Company	Set in the DCEU.
2023	Aquaman and the Lost Kingdom	Warner Bros./DC Films/The Safran Company/Atomic Monster	Set in the DCEU.
2024	Joker: Folie à Deux	Warner Bros./Joint Effort	
2025	Superman	DC Studios/Troll Court Entertainment/The Safran Company	
2026	Supergirl	DC Studios/Troll Court Entertainment/The Safran Company	
2026	Clayface	DC Studios/6th & Idaho Productions/Troll Court Entertainment/The Safran Company	
Upcoming
2027	Man of Tomorrow	DC Studios/Troll Court Entertainment/The Safran Company	Post-production.
2028	The Batman: Part II	DC Studios/6th & Idaho Productions/Dylan Clark Productions	Filming.

=== Serials and short films ===
Year	Title	Studio(s)	Notes	Chapters
1941	Adventures of Captain Marvel	Republic Pictures	Published at that time by Fawcett Comics.	12
1942	Spy Smasher	Republic Pictures	Published at that time by Fawcett Comics.	12
1943	Batman	Columbia Pictures		15
1946	Hop Harrigan	Columbia Pictures		15
1947	The Vigilante	Columbia Pictures		15
1948	Superman	Columbia Pictures		15
1948	Congo Bill	Columbia Pictures		15
1949	Batman and Robin	Columbia Pictures		15
1950	Atom Man vs. Superman	Columbia Pictures		15
1952	Blackhawk: Fearless Champion of Freedom	Columbia Pictures	Published at that time by Quality Comics.	15
1954	Stamp Day for Superman	United States Department of the Treasury		1
2017	Etta's Mission	Warner Bros./DC Films	Set in the DCEU.	1

=== From DC imprints ===
==== Vertigo ====
Year	Title	Studio(s)	Distributor	Notes
2006	V for Vendetta	Virtual Studios/Silver Pictures/Anarchos Productions/Medienboard Berlin-Brandenburg/Fünfte Babelsberg Film GmbH	Warner Bros.	Based on the graphic novel by Alan Moore and David Lloyd.
2007	Stardust	Marv Films/Ingenious Film Partners	Paramount Pictures	Based on the original miniseries (Note: In 1997, the first edition of Stardust was published by DC's Vertigo imprint, before the novel's release on June 24, 1999.) by Neil Gaiman and Charles Vess.
2010	The Losers	DC Comics/Dark Castle Entertainment/StudioCanal	Warner Bros.	Based on the series by Andy Diggle and Jock.
2019	The Kitchen	New Line Cinema/DC Vertigo/Bron Creative/Michael De Luca Productions	Warner Bros.	Based on the original miniseries by Ollie Masters and Ming Doyle.

==== Paradox Press ====
Year	Title	Studio(s)	Distributor	Notes
2002	Road to Perdition	The Zanuck Company	DreamWorks Pictures/20th Century Fox	Based on the series by Max Allan Collins. Won 1 Oscar, nominated for 5 more.
2005	A History of Violence	New Line Productions/BenderSpink/München & Company	New Line Cinema	Based on the graphic novel by John Wagner and Vince Locke. Nominated for 2 Oscars.

==== WildStorm ====
Year	Title	Studio(s)	Distributor	Notes
2003	The League of Extraordinary Gentlemen	20th Century Fox/Angry Films/International Production Company/JD Productions	20th Century Fox	Based on the series (Note: The first edition of The League of Extraordinary Gentlemen was published on March 10, 1999, after Wildstorm was purchased by DC in 1998.) by Alan Moore and Kevin O'Neill.
2010	Red	DC Entertainment/Homage Entertainment/Di Bonaventura Pictures/Cheyenne Enterprises/DMG Entertainment	Summit Entertainment	Based on the miniseries by Warren Ellis and Cully Hamner.
2013	Red 2	DC Entertainment/Di Bonaventura	Summit Entertainment/Lionsgate	Based on the miniseries by Warren Ellis and Cully Hamner.

==== Mad Magazine ====
Year	Title	Studio(s)	Distributor	Notes
1980	Mad Magazine Presents Up the Academy	Warner Bros.	Warner Bros.	Based on the Mad Magazine series (Note: In the 1960s, MAD Magazine was sold to National Periodical Publications, which are the publishers of DC Comics. The film based on the series was released in 1980.) by Harvey Kurtzman.

=== Television films ===
Year	Title	Notes
1974	Wonder Woman	Pilot episode for an unproduced TV series.
1975	The New Original Wonder Woman	Pilot episode for the 1975 Wonder Woman television series.
1997	Justice League of America	Pilot episode for an unproduced TV series.

==== Episodes as films ====
Year	Title	Notes
1990	The Flash	Episodes of the 1990s The Flash television series released as direct-to-video films.
1991	The Flash II: Revenge of the Trickster	Episodes of the 1990s The Flash television series released as direct-to-video films.
1991	The Flash III: Deadly Nightshade	Episodes of the 1990s The Flash television series released as direct-to-video films.

== Animated films ==
All the feature films are produced by Warner Bros. Animation, except as indicated.

=== Feature films ===
==== Theatrical ====
Films produced for a theatrical release.

Year	Title	Notes
1993	Batman: Mask of the Phantasm	Set in the DCAU. Related to Batman: The Animated Series.
2017	The Lego Batman Movie	Spin-off of The Lego Movie.
2018	Teen Titans Go! To the Movies	Set in the universe of the Teen Titans Go! TV series.
2022	DC League of Super-Pets	CGI animation. Produced by Warner Animation Group.
2025	Aztec Batman: Clash of Empires	Theatrical release in Mexico.
Upcoming
2028	Dynamic Duo	A hybrid of live-action motion capture, stop-motion animation, and CG animation. Produced by DC Studios, Warner Bros. Pictures Animation, and 6th & Idaho.

==== Direct-to-video and streaming ====
Films produced for release to home video and streaming. Limited theatrical screenings are noted when applicable.

Year	Title	Notes
1998	Batman & Mr. Freeze: SubZero	Set in the DCAU. Related to Batman: The Animated Series.
2000	Batman Beyond: Return of the Joker	Set in the DCAU. Related to the Batman Beyond TV series.
2003	Batman: Mystery of the Batwoman	Set in the DCAU. Related to The New Batman Adventures TV series.
2005	The Batman vs. Dracula	Set in the universe of The Batman TV series. Released first on television.
2006	Superman: Brainiac Attacks	Somewhat related to Superman: The Animated Series, but not considered to be in continuity with the DCAU.
2006	Teen Titans: Trouble in Tokyo	Set in the universe of the Teen Titans TV series. Released first on television.
2007	Superman: Doomsday	First film in DC Universe Animated Original Movies. Loosely based on "The Death of Superman".
2008	Justice League: The New Frontier	Based on the DC: The New Frontier by Darwyn Cooke storyline.
2008	Batman: Gotham Knight	Collection of six shorts set between the events of Batman Begins and The Dark Knight, which are part of the universe of The Dark Knight trilogy of live-action films.
2009	Wonder Woman	Loosely based on the "Gods and Mortals" by George Pérez.
2009	Green Lantern: First Flight	Stand-alone, unrelated to Green Lantern: Emerald Knights. Adaptation of the DC Comics Green Lantern mythology.
2009	Superman/Batman: Public Enemies	Based on "Superman/Batman: Public Enemies" storyline by Jeph Loeb and Ed McGuinness.
2010	Justice League: Crisis on Two Earths	Adapted from an unused film plot meant to bridge Justice League and Justice League Unlimited. Loosely based on JLA: Earth 2 series by Grant Morrison and Frank Quitely.
2010	Batman: Under the Red Hood	Loosely based on the "Batman: Under the Hood" storyline by Judd Winick.
2010	Superman/Batman: Apocalypse	Sequel to Superman/Batman: Public Enemies. Based on the "Superman/Batman: The Supergirl from Krypton" storyline by Jeph Loeb and Michael Turner.
2011	All-Star Superman	Based on the All-Star Superman series by Grant Morrison and Frank Quitely.
2011	Green Lantern: Emerald Knights	Collection of six shorts.
2011	Batman: Year One	Based on the "Batman: Year One" storyline by Frank Miller and David Mazzucchelli.
2012	Justice League: Doom	Loosely based on the "JLA: Tower of Babel" storyline by Mark Waid.
2012	Superman vs. The Elite	Based on the "What's So Funny About Truth, Justice & the American Way?" storyline by Joe Kelly.
2012	The Dark Knight Returns – Part 1	Based on The Dark Knight Returns series by Frank Miller.
2013	The Dark Knight Returns – Part 2	Based on The Dark Knight Returns series by Frank Miller.
2013	Superman: Unbound	Based on the "Superman: Brainiac" storyline by Geoff Johns and Gary Frank.
2013	Lego Batman: The Movie – DC Super Heroes Unite	Based on the video game Lego Batman 2: DC Super Heroes.
2013	Justice League: The Flashpoint Paradox	First film set in the DC Animated Movie Universe. Based on "Flashpoint" storyline by Geoff Johns and Andy Kubert.
2014	JLA Adventures: Trapped in Time	
2014	Justice League: War	Second film set in the DC Animated Movie Universe. Based on The New 52's "Justice League: Origin" story by Geoff Johns and Jim Lee.
2014	Son of Batman	Third film set in the DC Animated Movie Universe. Based on the "Batman and Son" storyline by Grant Morrison and Andy Kubert.
2014	Batman: Assault on Arkham	Set in the universe of the Batman: Arkham video game franchise.
2015	Justice League: Throne of Atlantis	Fourth film set in the DC Animated Movie Universe. Based on the "Throne of Atlantis", The New 52's Aquaman crossover story by Geoff Johns.
2015	Lego DC Comics Super Heroes: Justice League vs. Bizarro League	
2015	Batman vs. Robin	Fifth film set in the DC Animated Movie Universe. Partially based on The New 52's Batman crossover story, "Court of Owls" by Scott Snyder and Greg Capullo.
2015	Batman Unlimited: Animal Instincts	First film set in the universe of Batman Unlimited, a line of action figures.
2015	Justice League: Gods and Monsters	Set in the same universe as the companion microseries of shorts Justice League: Gods and Monsters Chronicles.
2015	Batman Unlimited: Monster Mayhem	Second film set in the universe of Batman Unlimited, a line of action figures.
2015	Lego DC Comics Super Heroes: Justice League – Attack of the Legion of Doom	
2016	Batman: Bad Blood	Sixth film set in the DC Animated Movie Universe.
2016	Lego DC Comics Super Heroes: Justice League – Cosmic Clash	
2016	DC Super Hero Girls: Super Hero High	Set in the DC Super Hero Girls animated shorts universe. Released first on television.
2016	Justice League vs. Teen Titans	Seventh film set in the DC Animated Movie Universe.
2016	Lego DC Comics Super Heroes: Justice League – Gotham City Breakout	
2016	Batman: The Killing Joke	Based on the one-shot graphic novel of the same name by Alan Moore and Brian Bolland. Also received limited theatrical release.
2016	DC Super Hero Girls: Hero of the Year	Set in the DC Super Hero Girls animated shorts universe.
2016	Batman Unlimited: Mechs vs. Mutants	Third film set in the universe of Batman Unlimited, a line of action figures.
2016	Batman: Return of the Caped Crusaders	First animated film set in the universe of the 1960s Batman TV series. Also received limited theatrical release.
2017	Justice League Dark	Eighth film set in the DC Animated Movie Universe.
2017	Teen Titans: The Judas Contract	Ninth film set in the DC Animated Movie Universe. Based on "The Judas Contract" story arc by Marv Wolfman and George Pérez.
2017	DC Super Hero Girls: Intergalactic Games	Set in the DC Super Hero Girls animated shorts universe.
2017	Batman and Harley Quinn	Somewhat related to The New Batman Adventures, but considered to be DCAU adjacent.
2017	Lego DC Super Hero Girls: Brain Drain	
2017	Batman vs. Two-Face	Second animated film set in the universe of the 1960s Batman TV series.
2018	Scooby-Doo! & Batman: The Brave and the Bold	Related to the Batman: The Brave and the Bold TV series.
2018	Batman: Gotham by Gaslight	Based on Gotham by Gaslight, a one-shot story by Brian Augustyn and Mike Mignola which became, retroactively, the first official Elseworlds publication.
2018	Lego DC Comics Super Heroes: The Flash	
2018	Suicide Squad: Hell to Pay	Tenth film set in the DC Animated Movie Universe.
2018	Batman Ninja	Anime produced by Kamikaze Douga, YamatoWorks, and Barnum Studio.
2018	Lego DC Super Hero Girls: Super-Villain High	
2018	The Death of Superman	Eleventh film in the DC Animated Movie Universe. Based on "The Death of Superman" storyline.
2018	Lego DC Comics Super Heroes: Aquaman – Rage of Atlantis	
2018	DC Super Hero Girls: Legends of Atlantis	Set in the DC Super Hero Girls animated shorts universe.
2019	Reign of the Supermen	Twelfth film in the DC Animated Movie Universe. Based on the "Reign of the Supermen" storyline.
2019	Justice League vs. the Fatal Five	Related to Justice League Unlimited, though its canonicity is considered to be open-ended.
2019	Batman vs. Teenage Mutant Ninja Turtles	Produced in association with Nickelodeon. Based on the Batman/Teenage Mutant Ninja Turtles comic book by James Tynion IV and Freddie Williams II.
2019	Batman: Hush	Thirteenth film in the DC Animated Movie Universe. Based on the "Batman: Hush" storyline by Jeph Loeb and Jim Lee.
2019	Lego DC: Batman - Family Matters	
2019	Teen Titans Go! vs. Teen Titans	A crossover film between Teen Titans Go! and the original Teen Titans animated series.
2019	Wonder Woman: Bloodlines	Fourteenth film in the DC Animated Movie Universe.
2020	Superman: Red Son	Based on the Superman: Red Son comic book by Mark Millar.
2020	Lego DC Shazam! Magic and Monsters	
2020	Justice League Dark: Apokolips War	Fifteenth film in the DC Animated Movie Universe.
2020	Superman: Man of Tomorrow	Sixteenth film in the DC Animated Movie Universe.
2020	Happy Halloween, Scooby-Doo!	Features Dr. Jonathan Crane/The Scarecrow. Second crossover with Scooby-Doo.
2021	Batman: Soul of the Dragon	
2021	Justice Society: World War II	Seventeenth film in the DC Animated Movie Universe.
2021	Batman: The Long Halloween, Part One	Eighteenth and nineteenth films in the DC Animated Movie Universe. Based on Batman: The Long Halloween by Jeph Loeb and Tim Sale.
2021	Batman: The Long Halloween, Part Two	Eighteenth and nineteenth films in the DC Animated Movie Universe. Based on Batman: The Long Halloween by Jeph Loeb and Tim Sale.
2021	Injustice	Based on Injustice: Gods Among Us video game by NetherRealm Studios, and the tie-in comics by Tom Taylor.
2022	Catwoman: Hunted	Somewhat related to Young Justice, but considered to be canon-adjacent.
2022	Teen Titans Go! & DC Super Hero Girls: Mayhem in the Multiverse	A crossover film between Teen Titans Go! and DC Super Hero Girls animated series.
2022	Green Lantern: Beware My Power	Twentieth film in the DC Animated Movie Universe.
2022	Batman and Superman: Battle of the Super Sons	
2023	Legion of Super-Heroes	Twenty-first film in the DC Animated Movie Universe.
2023	Batman: The Doom That Came to Gotham	Based on Batman: The Doom That Came to Gotham comic series by Mike Mignola and Richard Pace.
2023	Justice League x RWBY: Super Heroes & Huntsmen, Part One	Based on RWBY/Justice League comic series by Marguerite Bennett, Aneke and Mirka Andolfo.
2023	Justice League: Warworld	Twenty-second film in the DC Animated Movie Universe.
2023	Scooby-Doo! and Krypto, Too!	Third crossover with Scooby-Doo.
2023	Justice League x RWBY: Super Heroes & Huntsmen, Part Two	Based on DC/RWBY comic series by Marguerite Bennett, Soo Lee, and Meghan Hetrick.
2023	Merry Little Batman	
2024	Justice League: Crisis on Infinite Earths – Part One	Twenty-third, twenty-fourth, and twenty-fifth and last films in the DC Animated Movie Universe. Based on Crisis on Infinite Earths miniseries by Marv Wolfman and George Pérez.
2024	Justice League: Crisis on Infinite Earths – Part Two	Twenty-third, twenty-fourth, and twenty-fifth and last films in the DC Animated Movie Universe. Based on Crisis on Infinite Earths miniseries by Marv Wolfman and George Pérez.
2024	Justice League: Crisis on Infinite Earths – Part Three	Twenty-third, twenty-fourth, and twenty-fifth and last films in the DC Animated Movie Universe. Based on Crisis on Infinite Earths miniseries by Marv Wolfman and George Pérez.
2024	Watchmen Chapter I	Produced in association with Paramount Pictures. Based on the limited series by Alan Moore and Dave Gibbons.
2024	Watchmen Chapter II	Produced in association with Paramount Pictures. Based on the limited series by Alan Moore and Dave Gibbons.
2025	Batman Ninja vs. Yakuza League	Anime produced by Kamikaze Douga, YamatoWorks, and Barnum Studio. Sequel to Batman Ninja.
2026	Batman: Knightfall – Part 1: Knightfall	Based on the comics of the same name by Doug Moench.
Upcoming
2026	Batman: Knightfall – Part 2: Knightquest	Based on the comics of the same name by Doug Moench.
2027	Batman: Knightfall – Part 3: KnightsEnd	Based on the comics of the same name by Doug Moench.

==== Episodes as films ====
Television series episodes are released as direct-to-video films.

Year	Title	Notes
1996	Superman: The Last Son of Krypton	Television movies; each one is a compilation of three episodes of respectively the first and second seasons of Superman: The Animated Series.
1997	The Batman/Superman Movie: World's Finest	Television movies; each one is a compilation of three episodes of respectively the first and second seasons of Superman: The Animated Series.
1999	Batman Beyond: The Movie	Compilation of the first two episodes of the Batman Beyond TV series.
2001	Justice League: Secret Origins	Television movies; each one is a compilation of respectively the first three and the last three episodes of the Justice League TV series.
2004	Justice League: Starcrossed	Television movies; each one is a compilation of respectively the first three and the last three episodes of the Justice League TV series.
2017	Vixen: The Movie	Set in the Arrowverse. Both features are re-releases of both seasons of the original series with new content added.
2018	Freedom Fighters: The Ray	Set in the Arrowverse. Both features are re-releases of both seasons of the original series with new content added.
2018	Constantine: City of Demons – The Movie	Set in the DC Animated Movie Universe.
2019	DC Super Hero Girls: Sweet Justice	Television movie; compilation of the first four episodes of DC Super Hero Girls.
2020	Deathstroke: Knights & Dragons: The Movie	Stand-alone.
2022	Aquaman: King of Atlantis	Stand-alone sequel to Aquaman. The miniseries was re-edited as a 2-hour film for its release on home media.

=== Short films ===
==== Theatrical ====
Year	Title	Studio(s)	Collection	Notes
1941	Superman (a.k.a. The Mad Scientist)	Fleischer Studios	Superman	Nominated for 1 Oscar. In public domain.
1941	The Mechanical Monsters	Fleischer Studios	Superman	In public domain.
1942	Billion Dollar Limited	Fleischer Studios	Superman	In public domain.
1942	The Arctic Giant	Fleischer Studios	Superman	In public domain.
1942	The Bulleteers	Fleischer Studios	Superman	In public domain.
1942	The Magnetic Telescope	Fleischer Studios	Superman	In public domain.
1942	Electric Earthquake	Fleischer Studios	Superman	In public domain.
1942	Volcano	Fleischer Studios	Superman	In public domain.
1942	Terror on the Midway	Fleischer Studios	Superman	In public domain.
1942	Japoteurs	Famous Studios	Superman	In public domain.
1942	Showdown	Famous Studios	Superman	In public domain.
1942	Eleventh Hour	Famous Studios	Superman	In public domain.
1942	Destruction, Inc.	Famous Studios	Superman	In public domain.
1943	The Mummy Strikes	Famous Studios	Superman	In public domain.
1943	Jungle Drums	Famous Studios	Superman	In public domain.
1943	The Underground World	Famous Studios	Superman	In public domain.
1943	Secret Agent	Famous Studios	Superman	In public domain.
2018	#TheLateBatsby	Warner Bros. Animation	DC Super Hero Girls	Premiered in front of Teen Titans Go! To the Movies.

==== Direct-to-video ====
Year	Title	Studio(s)	Collection	Notes
2003	Chase Me	Warner Bros. Animation		Included in Batman: Mystery of the Batwoman. Silent film; part of the DCAU.
2008	Have I Got a Story for You	Studio 4°C	Batman: Gotham Knight	Loosely canon to The Dark Knight Trilogy.
2008	Crossfire	Production I.G	Batman: Gotham Knight	Loosely canon to The Dark Knight Trilogy.
2008	Field Test	Bee Train	Batman: Gotham Knight	Loosely canon to The Dark Knight Trilogy.
2008	In Darkness Dwells	Madhouse	Batman: Gotham Knight	Loosely canon to The Dark Knight Trilogy.
2008	Working Through Pain	Studio 4°C	Batman: Gotham Knight	Loosely canon to The Dark Knight Trilogy.
2008	Deadshot	Madhouse	Batman: Gotham Knight	Loosely canon to The Dark Knight Trilogy.
2009	Tales of the Black Freighter	Warner Bros. Animation		Included in the Watchmen home video release.
2010	Joker's Playhouse	Warner Bros. Animation		A one-off special short, produced as part of Fisher-Price's Imaginext product line.
2010	The Spectre	Warner Bros. Animation	DC Showcase	Included in Justice League: Crisis on Two Earths.
2010	Jonah Hex	Warner Bros. Animation	DC Showcase	Included in Batman: Under the Red Hood.
2010	Green Arrow	Warner Bros. Animation	DC Showcase	Included in Superman/Batman: Apocalypse.
2010	Superman/Shazam!: The Return of Black Adam	Warner Bros. Animation	DC Showcase	Included in DC Showcase Original Shorts Collection.
2011	Catwoman	Warner Bros. Animation	DC Showcase	Included in Batman: Year One.
2013	Superman 75th Anniversary Animated Short	Warner Bros. Animation		
2014	Lego DC Comics Super Heroes: Batman Be-Leaguered	Warner Bros. Animation		
2015	Nightwing and Robin	Warner Bros. Animation		Included in Justice League: Throne of Atlantis. Part of the DCAMU.
2015	Constantine: John Con Noir	Cool Town Claymation		Part of the promotion of the TV series Constantine.
2019	Sgt. Rock	Warner Bros. Animation	DC Showcase	Included in Batman: Hush.
2019	Death	Warner Bros. Animation	DC Showcase	Included in Wonder Woman: Bloodlines.
2020	Black Adam Precursor	Warner Bros. Animation	DC Showcase	Two-parts promoting Black Adam.
2020	The Phantom Stranger	Warner Bros. Animation	DC Showcase	Included in Superman: Red Son.
2020	Adam Strange	Warner Bros. Animation	DC Showcase	Included in Justice League Dark: Apokolips War.
2020	Batman: Death in the Family	Warner Bros. Animation	DC Showcase	Interactive movie. Follow-up to Batman: Under the Red Hood. Based on Batman: A Death in the Family storyline by Jim Starlin and Jim Aparo.
2021	The Mother Box Origins	Warner Bros. Animation	DC Showcase	Promoted Zack Snyder's Justice League.
2021	Kamandi: The Last Boy on Earth!	Warner Bros. Animation	DC Showcase	Included in Justice Society: World War II.
2021	The Losers	Warner Bros. Animation	DC Showcase	Included in Batman: The Long Halloween, Part One.
2021	Blue Beetle	Warner Bros. Animation	DC Showcase	Included in Batman: The Long Halloween, Part Two.
2022	Constantine: The House of Mystery	Warner Bros. Animation	DC Showcase	A long-form animated short. Sequel to Justice League Dark: Apokolips War.

== Reception ==
=== Box office ===
All films distributed by Warner Bros. Pictures, except as indicated.

Title	Release date (United States)	Budget (millions)	Box office gross			Notes
Title	Release date (United States)	Budget (millions)	Opening weekend (North America)	North America	Worldwide	Notes
Batman	July 30, 1966	$1.4	—N/a	—N/a	$3,315	
Superman	December 10, 1978	$55	$6,535,784	$134,218,018	$300,218,018	
Superman II	June 19, 1981	$54	$14,100,523	$108,185,706	$216,385,706	
Swamp Thing	February 19, 1982	$2.5	—N/a	—N/a	—N/a	Distributed by Embassy Pictures
Superman III	June 17, 1983	$39	$13,352,357	$59,950,623	$80,250,623	
Supergirl	November 21, 1984	$35	$5,738,249	$14,296,438	$14,296,438	Distributed by TriStar Pictures
Superman IV: The Quest for Peace	July 24, 1987	$17	$5,683,122	$15,681,020	$30,281,020	
The Return of Swamp Thing	May 12, 1989	—N/a	—N/a	$192,816	$192,816	Distributed by Millimeter Films
Batman	June 23, 1989	$35	$40,489,746	$251,409,241	$411,569,241	
Batman Returns	June 19, 1992	$80	$45,687,711	$162,924,631	$266,934,688	
Batman: Mask of the Phantasm	December 25, 1993	$6	$1,189,975	$5,635,204	$5,848,204	
Batman Forever	June 16, 1995	$100	$52,784,433	$184,069,126	$336,567,158	
Batman & Robin	June 20, 1997	$125	$42,872,605	$107,353,792	$238,253,988	
Steel	August 15, 1997	$16	$870,068	$1,710,972	$1,801,972	
Catwoman	July 23, 2004	$100	$16,728,411	$40,202,379	$82,402,379	
Constantine	February 18, 2005	$100	$29,769,098	$75,976,178	$230,884,728	
Batman Begins	June 28, 2005	$150	$48,745,440	$206,863,479	$375,587,589	
Superman Returns	June 20, 2006	$204	$52,535,096	$200,081,192	$391,081,192	
The Dark Knight	July 18, 2008	$185	$158,411,483	$534,987,076	$1,029,266,147	
Watchmen	March 6, 2009	$130	$55,214,334	$107,509,799	$185,382,813	
Jonah Hex	June 18, 2010	$47	$5,379,365	$10,547,117	$10,903,312	
Green Lantern	June 17, 2011	$200	$53,174,303	$116,601,172	$237,201,172	
The Dark Knight Rises	July 20, 2012	$230	$160,887,295	$448,149,584	$1,114,085,030	
Man of Steel	June 14, 2013	$225	$116,619,362	$291,045,518	$670,145,518	
Batman v Superman: Dawn of Justice	March 25, 2016	$250	$166,007,347	$330,360,194	$874,362,803	
Batman: The Killing Joke	July 26, 2016	$3.5	—N/a	$3,775,000	$4,462,034	From a limited theatrical release
Suicide Squad	August 5, 2016	$175	$133,682,248	$325,100,054	$749,200,054	
Batman: Return of the Caped Crusaders	October 10, 2016	—N/a	—N/a	$56,711	$56,711	From a limited theatrical release
The Lego Batman Movie	February 10, 2017	$80	$53,003,578	$175,936,671	$312,336,671	
Wonder Woman	June 2, 2017	$149	$103,251,471	$412,845,172	$823,970,682	
Batman and Harley Quinn	August 14, 2017	—N/a	—N/a	$6,448	$6,448	From a limited theatrical release
Justice League	November 17, 2017	$300	$93,842,239	$229,024,295	$661,326,987	
Teen Titans Go! To the Movies	July 27, 2018	$10	$10,411,189	$29,790,236	$52,390,236	
Aquaman	December 21, 2018	$160	$67,873,522	$335,104,314	$1,152,028,393	
Shazam!	April 5, 2019	$100	$53,505,326	$140,480,049	$367,799,011	
Joker	October 4, 2019	$55	$96,202,337	$335,477,657	$1,078,958,282	
Birds of Prey	February 7, 2020	$84.5	$33,010,017	$84,172,791	$205,372,791	
Wonder Woman 1984	December 25, 2020	$200	$16,700,000	$46,801,036	$169,601,036	
The Suicide Squad	August 6, 2021	$185	$26,205,415	$55,817,425	$168,717,425	
The Batman	March 4, 2022	$185–200	$134,008,624	$369,345,583	$772,245,583	
DC League of Super-Pets	July 29, 2022	$90	$23,003,441	$93,657,117	$207,557,117	
Black Adam	October 21, 2022	$260	$67,004,323	$168,152,111	$393,452,111	
Shazam! Fury of the Gods	March 17, 2023	$125	$30,111,158	$57,638,006	$134,038,006	
The Flash	June 16, 2023	$200	$55,043,679	$108,133,313	$271,333,313	
Blue Beetle	August 18, 2023	$104	$25,030,225	$72,488,072	$130,788,072	
Aquaman and the Lost Kingdom	December 22, 2023	$215	$27,686,211	$124,481,226	$434,381,226	
Joker: Folie à Deux	October 4, 2024	$200	$37,678,467	$58,300,287	$206,400,287	
Superman	July 11, 2025	$225	$125,021,735	$354,223,803	$618,723,803	
Aztec Batman: Clash of Empires	September 19, 2025	—N/a	—N/a	—N/a	$663,244	From a limited theatrical release
Supergirl	June 26, 2026	$186	$37,102,018	$72,366,532	$126,366,532	
Clayface	October 23, 2026	$44	$24,002,731	$66,195,000	$126,195,000	
Total		$5.738 billion	$2,387,098,401	$7,197,831,219	$16,404,787,960	—N/a

=== Critical and public reception ===
Film	Rotten Tomatoes	Metacritic	CinemaScore
Batman (1966)	80% 6.3/10 (35 reviews)	71 (4 reviews)	—N/a
Superman (1978)	87% 7.9/10 (123 reviews)	82 (21 reviews)	—N/a
Superman II	89% 7.6/10 (114 reviews)	83 (16 reviews)	—N/a
Swamp Thing	62% 5.6/10 (42 reviews)	50 (10 reviews)	—N/a
Superman III	29% 4.6/10 (59 reviews)	44 (13 reviews)	—N/a
Supergirl (1984)	19% 4.1/10 (134 reviews)	42 (12 reviews)	—N/a
Superman IV: The Quest for Peace	10% 3.1/10 (52 reviews)	24 (17 reviews)	C
The Return of Swamp Thing	44% 3.9/10 (9 reviews)	39 (9 reviews)	—N/a
Batman (1989)	77% 7.1/10 (142 reviews)	69 (21 reviews)	A
Batman Returns	81% 6.9/10 (95 reviews)	68 (23 reviews)	B
Batman: Mask of the Phantasm	83% 6.9/10 (58 reviews)	65 (18 reviews)	—N/a
Batman Forever	41% 5.2/10 (73 reviews)	51 (23 reviews)	A–
Batman & Robin	11% 3.8/10 (95 reviews)	28 (21 reviews)	C+
Steel	12% 3.2/10 (26 reviews)	28 (12 reviews)	B
Catwoman	8% 3.2/10 (195 reviews)	27 (35 reviews)	B
Constantine	46% 5.5/10 (227 reviews)	50 (41 reviews)	B
Batman Begins	85% 8.10/10 (285 reviews)	70 (41 reviews)	A
Superman Returns	74% 7/10 (267 reviews)	72 (40 reviews)	B+
The Dark Knight	94% (339 reviews)	84 (39 reviews)	A
Watchmen	65% 6.4/10 (311 reviews)	56 (39 reviews)	B
Jonah Hex	12% 3.6/10 (154 reviews)	33 (32 reviews)	C+
Green Lantern	25% 4.7/10 (248 reviews)	39 (39 reviews)	B
The Dark Knight Rises	87% 8/10 (376 reviews)	78 (45 reviews)	A
Man of Steel	57% 6.2/10 (340 reviews)	55 (47 reviews)	A–
Batman v Superman: Dawn of Justice	28% 5/10 (436 reviews)	44 (51 reviews)	B
Batman: The Killing Joke	35% 5.7/10 (46 reviews)	—N/a	—N/a
Suicide Squad	26% 4.8/10 (394 reviews)	40 (53 reviews)	B+
Batman: Return of the Caped Crusaders	94% 7.9/10 (18 reviews)	—N/a	—N/a
The Lego Batman Movie	89% 7.5/10 (313 reviews)	75 (48 reviews)	A–
Wonder Woman	93% 7.7/10 (480 reviews)	76 (50 reviews)	A
Batman and Harley Quinn	50% 5.8/10 (12 reviews)	—N/a	—N/a
Justice League	39% 5.3/10 (411 reviews)	45 (52 reviews)	B+
Teen Titans Go! To the Movies	91% 7.2/10 (133 reviews)	69 (25 reviews)	B+
Aquaman	65% 6/10 (414 reviews)	55 (50 reviews)	A–
Shazam!	90% 7.3/10 (421 reviews)	71 (53 reviews)	A
Joker	68% 7.3/10 (598 reviews)	59 (58 reviews)	B+
Birds of Prey	79% 6.8/10 (450 reviews)	60 (59 reviews)	B+
Wonder Woman 1984	57% 6.1/10 (456 reviews)	60 (57 reviews)	B+
Zack Snyder's Justice League	71% 6.7/10 (313 reviews)	54 (45 reviews)	—N/a
The Suicide Squad	90% 7.5/10 (384 reviews)	72 (53 reviews)	B+
The Batman	85% 7.7/10 (526 reviews)	72 (68 reviews)	A–
DC League of Super-Pets	73% 6.3/10 (148 reviews)	56 (28 reviews)	A–
Black Adam	38% 5.1/10 (294 reviews)	41 (52 reviews)	B+
Shazam! Fury of the Gods	49% 5.8/10 (257 reviews)	47 (49 reviews)	B+
The Flash	63% 6.4/10 (387 reviews)	56 (54 reviews)	B
Blue Beetle	78% 6.4/10 (274 reviews)	61 (46 reviews)	B+
Aquaman and the Lost Kingdom	34% 4.9/10 (208 reviews)	42 (43 reviews)	B
Joker: Folie à Deux	31% 5/10 (371 reviews)	45 (62 reviews)	D
Superman (2025)	83% 7.2/10 (505 reviews)	68 (58 reviews)	A−
Supergirl (2026)	52% 5.5/10 (365 reviews)	50 (56 reviews)	B−
Clayface	77% 6.6/10 (194 reviews)	59 (45 reviews)	A−
List indicator: A dark gray cell indicates information is not available for the film.

=== From DC imprints ===
Vertigo
Title	Distributor(s)	Release date	Rotten Tomatoes	Metacritic	CinemaScore	Budget (million)	Box office
V for Vendetta	Warner Bros.	March 17, 2006	73% (248 reviews)	62 (39 reviews)	B+	$54	$132,511,035
Stardust	Paramount Pictures	August 10, 2007	77% (196 reviews)	66 (33 reviews)	A–	$70–88.5	$137,022,245
The Losers	Warner Bros.	April 23, 2010	49% (167 reviews)	44 (32 reviews)	B	$25	$29,863,840
The Kitchen	Warner Bros.	August 9, 2019	23% (230 reviews)	35 (42 reviews)	B–	$38	$15,980,032

Paradox Press
Title	Distributor(s)	Release date	Rotten Tomatoes	Metacritic	CinemaScore	Budget (million)	Box office
Road to Perdition	DreamWorks/20th Century Fox	July 12, 2002	81% (216 reviews)	72 (36 reviews)	B+	$80	$181,001,478
A History of Violence	New Line Cinema	May 16, 2005	87% (214 reviews)	82 (37 reviews)	C+	$32	$60,740,827

WildStorm
Title	Distributor(s)	Release date	Rotten Tomatoes	Metacritic	CinemaScore	Budget (million)	Box office
The League of Extraordinary Gentlemen	20th Century Fox	July 11, 2003	17% (185 reviews)	30 (36 reviews)	B−	$78	$179,265,204
RED	Summit Entertainment	October 15, 2010	72% (211 reviews)	60 (38 reviews)	A−	$58	$199,006,387
RED 2	Summit Entertainment	July 19, 2013	44% (151 reviews)	47 (38 reviews)	B+	$84	$148,075,565

Mad Magazine
Title	Distributor(s)	Release date	Rotten Tomatoes	Metacritic	CinemaScore	Budget (million)	Box office
Mad Magazine Presents Up the Academy	Warner Bros.	June 6, 1980	0% (5 reviews)	29 (4 reviews)	—N/a	$5	$10,000,000

== See also ==
- List of television series based on DC Comics publications
- List of video games based on DC Comics
- List of films based on Marvel Comics publications
- List of television series based on Marvel Comics publications
- List of unproduced DC Comics projects
  - List of unproduced films based on DC Comics imprints
