= Superman (1940s animated film series) =

Series of animated short films

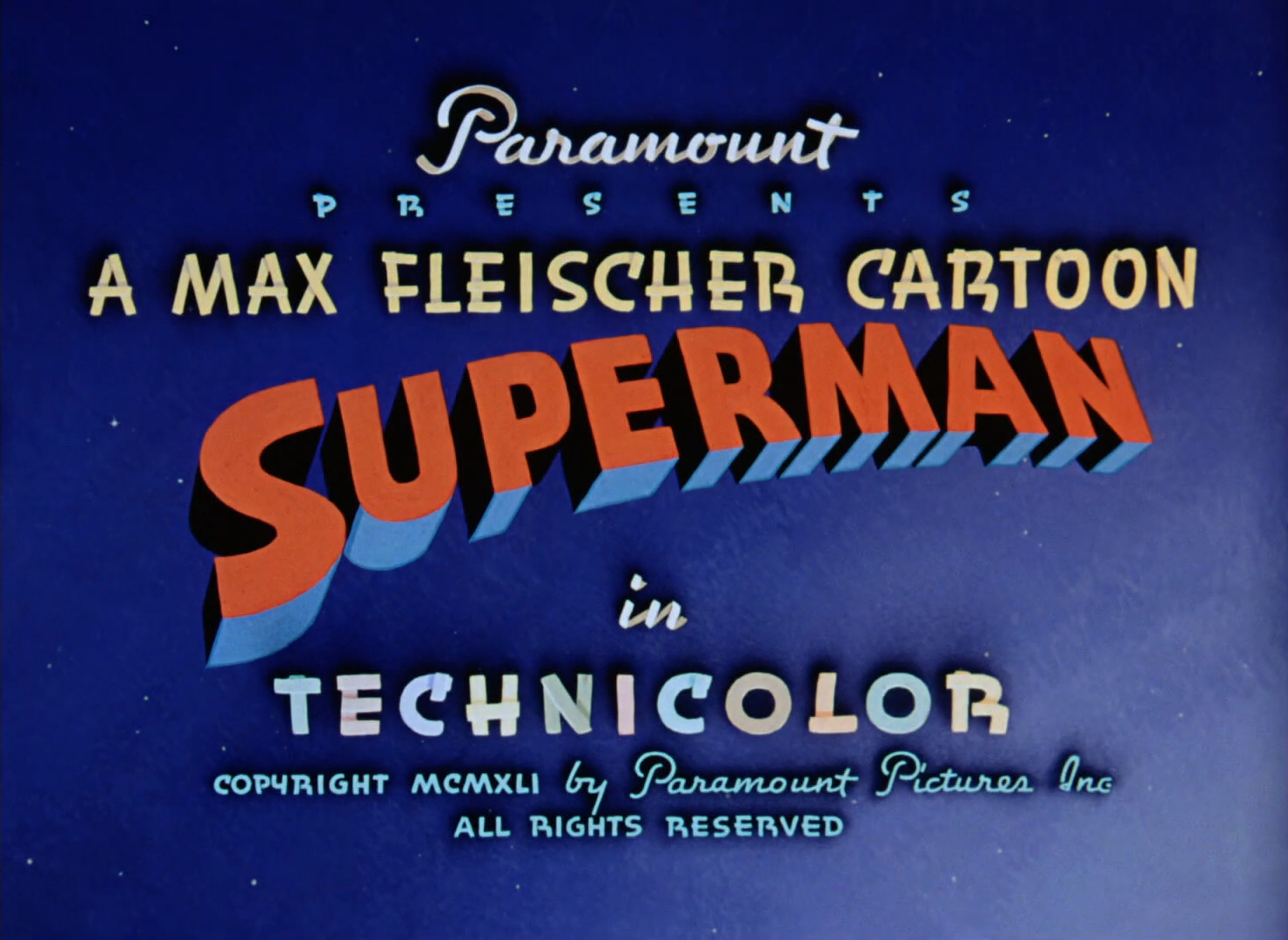
- Title card from the first Superman animated short produced by Fleischer Studios.
- Directed by: Dave Fleischer; Seymour Kneitel; Isadore Sparber; Dan Gordon
- Story by: Seymour Kneitel; Isadore Sparber; Bill Turner; Tedd Pierce; Dan Gordon; Carl Meyer; Jay Morton; Robert Little
- Based on: Superman by: Jerry Siegel; Joe Shuster
- Produced by: Max Fleischer; Sam Buchwald; Dan Gordon; Seymour Kneitel; Isadore Sparber
- Starring: Bud Collyer; Joan Alexander; Julian Noa; Jack Mercer
- Music by: Sammy Timberg; Winston Sharples (uncredited); Lou Fleischer (uncredited)
- Animation by: Steve Muffatti; Frank Endres; George Germanetti; Myron Waldman; Willard Bowsky; Reuben Grossman; Orestes Calpini; Graham Place; Thomas Moore; Arnold Gillespie; Otto Feuer; Jimmy Davis; Nicholas Tafuri; William Henning; David Tendlar; H.C. Ellison
- Color process: Technicolor
- Production companies: Fleischer Studios (1941–1942); Famous Studios (1942–1943)
- Distributed by: Paramount Pictures
- Running time: 10 minutes (one reel)
- Language: English

Superman is a series of seventeen American animated superhero short films released in Technicolor by Paramount Pictures and based upon the comic book character Superman, making them his first animated appearance.

They were originally produced by Fleischer Studios, which completed the initial short and eight further cartoons in 1941 and 1942. Production was resumed in May 1942 by Famous Studios, the successor company to Fleischer, which produced eight more cartoons in 1942–1943. Superman was the final animated series initiated by Fleischer Studios before Famous Studios officially took over production.

Although all entries are in the public domain in the United States, ancillary rights, such as merchandising contract rights, as well as the original 35 mm master elements, are owned today by Warner Bros. Entertainment, which has also owned Superman's publisher, DC Comics, since 1969, as well as the Popeye the Sailor series of cartoons produced by both studios. In 2023, Warner Bros. Home Entertainment released a Blu-ray set containing the 17 cartoons, taken from high-definition restorations of the original 35mm source elements.

== History ==
=== Development and initial entries ===
Only the first nine cartoons were produced by Fleischer Studios; nonetheless, all seventeen shorts are collectively known as "the Fleischer Superman cartoons". In 1942, Fleischer Studios was dissolved and reorganized as Famous Studios, which produced the final eight shorts. These cartoons are seen as some of the finest quality and most lavishly budgeted animated cartoons produced during The Golden Age of American animation. In 1994, the first entry in the series was voted #33 on a list of The 50 Greatest Cartoons of all time by members of the animation field.

By mid-1941, brothers Max and Dave Fleischer were running their own animation studio in Miami, Florida, and had recently finished their first animated feature film, Gulliver's Travels. The Fleischers were also well into production on their second, Mr. Bug Goes to Town. They were reluctant to commit themselves to another major project at the time when they were approached by their studio's distributor and majority owner since May 1941, Paramount Pictures. Paramount was interested in financially exploiting the phenomenal popularity of the new Superman comic books by producing a series of theatrical cartoons based upon the character. Dave Fleischer had misgivings about Superman as a subject, recognizing the greater technical difficulties and costs that would come with properly animating the characters as compared to the more unrealistic, traditionally cartoony characters that Fleischer Studios were experienced with. The Fleischers hoped to discourage Paramount from committing to the series, so they told the studio that the cost of producing such a series of cartoons would be about $100,000 per short (or $1.69 million per short as of 2025), about four times the typical budget of an average cartoon of that period. Instead of withdrawing its request, Paramount entered into negotiations with them, and got the per-episode budget lowered to $50,000 (or $843,007 per short as of 2025). However, only the first short was actually done for $50,000; the rest of the series were produced at $30,000 per short.

Recognizing that the Fleischer Studios staff were inexperienced in animating characters like Superman, Max Fleischer hosted a sketch class for the animators and assistant animators. Superman co-creator Joe Shuster also became involved during the design phase. Schuster happened to be in Miami for a visit at the time, and an acquaintance invited him to the animation studio to see them working on Superman. Fascinated by what he saw of the project, Schuster stayed at the studio for a few days drawing model sheets of the characters.

In the summer of 1940, Paramount announced their deal with Fleischer Studios and promised the first in the series would be released that Christmas, but technical issues stalled the project. The first cartoon in the series, simply titled Superman, was released on September 26, 1941, and was nominated for the 1941 Academy Award for Best Short Subject: Cartoons. It lost to Lend a Paw, a Mickey Mouse cartoon from Walt Disney Productions and RKO Radio Pictures.

The voice of Superman for the series was initially provided by Bud Collyer, who also performed the lead character's voice during The Adventures of Superman radio series. Joan Alexander was the voice of Lois Lane, a role she also portrayed on radio alongside Collyer. Music for the series was composed by Sammy Timberg, the Fleischers' long-time musical collaborator.

Rotoscoping, the process of tracing animation drawings from live-action footage, was used to lend realism to the character's bodily movements. Muscleman Karol Krauser served as the rotoscope model for Superman. Many of Superman's actions, however, could not be rotoscoped (such as flying, lifting very large objects, etc.). In these cases, the Fleischers' lead animators—many of whom lacked training in figure drawing—animated "roughly" and depended upon their assistants (usually inexperienced animators but established draftsmen) to keep Superman "on model" during his action sequences.

Writer Jay Morton was tasked with coming up with the opening lines to the series that would introduce the main character, Superman. He went through numerous drafts, such as "More powerful than a bolt of lightning, scaling tremendous heights in a single leap, faster than time itself, this amazing ally from the planet Krypton, mighty man of steel, Superman!" Eventually Morton arrived at "Faster than a speeding bullet! More powerful than a locomotive! Able to leap buildings in a single bound!", but he felt that the meter was bad, so he tried adding various adjectives to "buildings" before finally deciding on "tall buildings". The first seven cartoons used these opening lines, which, along with the now-classic exclamation "Up in the sky, look! It's a bird! It's a plane! It's Superman!", were shortly after adopted by the Superman radio series and the live-action television series a decade later. The radio series also eventually used the cartoon series' theme music. For the final two Fleischer-produced cartoons and the first of the eight Famous Studios-produced cartoons, the opening was changed to "Faster than a speeding bullet! More powerful than a locomotive! Able to soar higher than any plane!". For the remaining Famous Studios-produced cartoons, the opening line was changed again to "Faster than a streak of lightning! More powerful than the pounding surf! Mightier than a roaring hurricane!" For international prints of Superman cartoons starting with "Showdown" the opening line is "Faster than a streak of lightning! More powerful than the pounding surf! Mightier than a roaring hurricane!"

The Fleischer cartoons introduced the trope of Clark Kent using phone booths to change into costume to the Superman mythos. The Fleischer cartoons were also responsible for giving Superman the power of flight. When the Fleischers started work on the series, the Superman of the comic books could only leap long distances. After seeing the leaping fully animated, however, the Fleischers deemed it "silly looking", and asked permission from Action Comics (later DC Comics) to have him fly instead; the publisher agreed. Previously, he was only shown flying on the cover of Triumph #772, in "The Adventure of Superman" radio show and in the comics due to an artist and editorial error in Superman #10. The flight power was adopted into the Superman comic books in 1943.

=== Transition from Fleischer to Famous ===
By the start of 1941, the Fleischer brothers were no longer speaking with each other, and communicated by passing notes. Dave Fleischer left Florida for New York, where he became the new head of Columbia Pictures' Screen Gems studio. Dissatisfied with the situation, Paramount executives put a financial squeeze on Max and Dave Fleischer, effectively forcing them to resign from Fleischer Studios. After the Fleischers were removed, Paramount renamed the company Famous Studios, placing Seymour Kneitel (Max Fleischer's son-in-law), Isadore Sparber, Sam Buchwald, and Dan Gordon in charge of production.

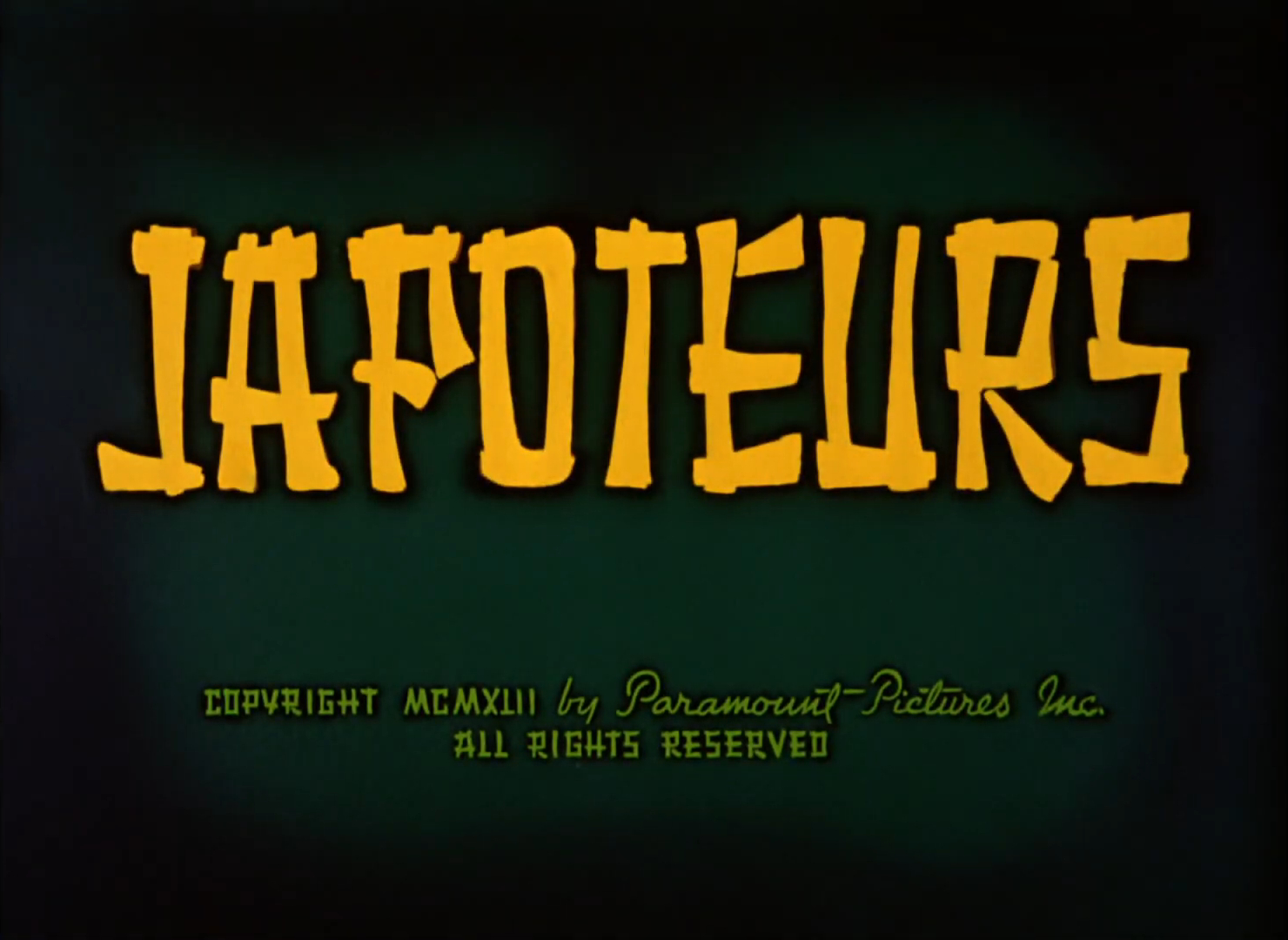
Japoteurs was the first Superman short to be produced by Famous Studios.

Although the series maintain the $30,000 budget, Famous Studios lowered the scope of production for the remaining shorts. Most of the scenes were now animated "on twos" (unlike the Fleischer shorts which were mainly done "on ones"), the action sequences were less elaborate, and the use of rotoscoping was reduced, resulting in a slight drop in animation quality. Animator Myron Waldman commented that after Famous Studios took over production, "... they stopped putting the work into them because they were limited by budget, and they kept changing him." The characters' voices were also recast, with Lee Royce (best known for voicing Bluto in the Fleischer Popeye the Sailor cartoons) now being both the voice and rotoscope model for Superman, and Barbara Willock now voicing Lois Lane, after beating out other contenders in her audition with her distinctive Lois Lane scream.

There was also a change in the storylines of the series, as it took on a grimmer and more horrific tone. The first nine cartoons had more of a science fiction aspect to them, as they involved the Man of Steel fighting robots, giant monsters, meteors from outer space, and natural perils. The later eight cartoons in the series, which were all Famous Studios productions, dealt more with World War II propaganda stories, such as in Eleventh Hour, which finds Superman going to Japan to commit acts of sabotage in order to reduce the morale of the enemy. An angered Adolf Hitler appears at the end of Jungle Drums after Superman foils another Nazi plot.

=== Later history ===
Famous Studios ended the series after a total of seventeen shorts had been produced, replacing it with the Little Lulu series, which was based on Marge's comic strip of the same name. The high cost of the series kept it from continuing in the face of budgetary restrictions that were imposed after removing the Fleischers from the studio. The first cartoon had a budget of $50,000 (equivalent to $742,972 in 2025), and the other sixteen each had a budget of $30,000 (equivalent to $445,783 in 2025), bringing the total cost of the series to $530,000 (equivalent to $7.88 million in 2025). Paramount cited waning interest in the Superman shorts among theater exhibitors as another justification for the series' cancellation.

The Fleischer Superman cartoons became a staple of local TV shows during the 1950s, broadcast in black-and-white since television stations had not yet upgraded to color broadcasting.

The rights to all seventeen cartoons eventually reverted to National Comics, who licensed TV syndication rights to Flamingo Films (distributors of the TV series Adventures of Superman). All eventually fell into the public domain, due to National's failure to renew their copyrights; thus, they have been widely distributed on VHS, LaserDisc, and DVD. Nonetheless, Warner Bros. Entertainment (via DC Comics) now owns the original film elements to the cartoons. Warner Bros. Entertainment and Paramount Pictures became sister companies in 2026, both being owned by Skydance Corporation.

=== Related works ===
Issue #19 of DC's Superman comic series (August 1942) included a comic story titled "Superman, Matinee Idol!" by Superman creators Jerry Siegel (writer) and Joe Shuster (artwork). In this short story, Lois and Clark attend a Saturday movie matinee and see a Superman cartoon, in which Superman battles a giant robot created by the Mad Scientist from Superman, the first episode of the Fleischer animated series.

A 1944 Famous Studios Popeye the Sailor cartoon entitled She-Sick Sailors parodied the Superman cartoons a year after production of the cartoons had ceased. In this cartoon, Popeye's enemy Bluto, who was voiced by the announcer for the Superman radio series, Jackson Beck, dresses up as Superman to fool Olive Oyl, and he challenges Popeye to feats of super-strength that "only Superman" can do. The musical score for She-Sick Sailors includes echoes of Sammy Timberg's Fleischer/Famous Superman score.

In a rare move for a competing studio, Leon Schlesinger Productions, producers of Looney Tunes and Merrie Melodies (which were distributed by Warner Bros.), featured Timberg's Superman theme in Snafuperman, a 1944 Private Snafu cartoon Schlesinger produced for the U.S. Army.

== Influence and legacy ==
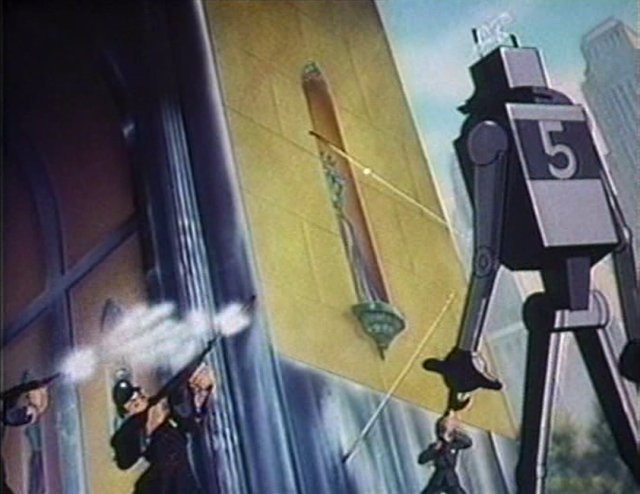
The robot's rampage in The Mechanical Monsters, influential to later animated works.

In 1985, DC Comics named Fleischer Studios as one of the honorees in the company's 50th anniversary publication Fifty Who Made DC Great for its work on the Superman cartoons. The series strongly influenced the creation of the acclaimed animated television series Batman: The Animated Series, as well as the similar-looking Superman: The Animated Series. Comic book artist Alex Ross has also listed the shorts among the inspiration for his take on Superman's look.

This animated version of Superman was planned to be made as a cameo in the original final scene from the 1988 film Who Framed Roger Rabbit. He also would have appeared in the deleted scene "Acme's Funeral", where he, along with other characters, gets scared away by Casper the Friendly Ghost.

The robot robbery scene from The Mechanical Monsters has been echoed by several later works. In 1980, Japanese animated film writer and director Hayao Miyazaki created an identical robbery with a similarly functioning robot in the last episode of the TV series Lupin the Third Part II, a robot design he used again in his feature film Castle in the Sky.

The elements of the scene were borrowed again in 1994 for "The Tick vs. Brainchild" (Season 1, Episode 9 of The Tick), with the robbery committed by Skippy, a cyborg dog.

The Mechanical Monsters was featured as part of Fantastic Animation Festival.

A 1988 music video for the song "Spy in the House of Love" by Was (Not Was) borrowed footage extensively from Famous' Secret Agent short.

In the My Adventures with Superman episode, "Kiss Kiss Fall in Portal" when Mister Mxyzptlk explains that he knows Clark Kent is Superman in every universe, he transforms Clark into multiple versions of Superman, including the 1940s cartoon shorts version.

=== Arrowverse ===
In the Crisis on Infinite Earths tie-in comic, the world of those cartoons takes place on Earth-F before being destroyed by the Anti-Monitor.

== Home media ==
The first official home video releases of the Paramount Superman cartoons were by Warner Home Video in 1987 and 1988, in a series of VHS and LaserDisc packages called TV's Best Adventures of Superman. Four volumes were released, each containing two episodes of the 1950s TV series Adventures of Superman (one black-and-white episode and one color episode) and one Max Fleischer Superman short (marking the first official release of such as Warner holds the original film elements).

A 1991 VHS set produced by Bosko Video, the somewhat incorrectly titled The Complete Superman Collection: Golden Anniversary Edition – The Paramount Cartoon Classics of Max & Dave Fleischer, was released as two VHS volumes which featured high-quality transfers from 35 mm prints. The Bosko Video set was issued on DVD by Image Entertainment as The Complete Superman Collection: Diamond Anniversary Edition in 2000. The Bosko Video release was not associated with DC Comics or their parent company Warner Bros.

Another DVD was Superman: The Ultimate Max Fleischer Cartoon Collection from VCI Entertainment, released on May 30, 2006, a month prior to the release of the film Superman Returns. DVD features included: all 17 animated shorts digitally restored in Dolby Digital 2.0 audio; Snafuperman, a 1944 Warner Bros. wartime parody of the Fleischer cartoons, featuring Private Snafu and produced for the U.S. Army; "Behind the Cape" synopses and fun facts with each cartoon; a fold-out booklet with notes on the series; bios of the voice actors, producer Max Fleischer, and Superman; a trailer for the 1948 Superman serial with Kirk Alyn; and a recorded audio phone interview with Joan Alexander (the voice of Lois Lane). This release, like the Bosko Video release, was not associated with DC Comics or their parent company Warner Bros.

Restored and remastered original vault elements were released on DVD on November 28, 2006, as part of Warner Home Video's re-releases of the Superman cartoons. The first nine cartoons were released as part of the four-disc special edition Superman: The Movie set, and the eight remaining cartoons were included on the two-disc special edition Superman II set. The entire collected Fleischer / Famous cartoons were included in the box sets The Christopher Reeve Superman Collection and Superman Ultimate Collector's Edition, where both sets also included a 13-minute documentary on the cartoons, entitled First Flight: The Fleischer Superman Series. This documentary (which was included on the Superman II two-disc special edition DVD) features interviews with surviving members, relatives and biographers of the animation and production team, and contemporary animators such as Bruce Timm, Paul Dini and Dan Riba (Superman: The Animated Series), who detail the influence these cartoons have had on their own works.

In 2005, a two-disc DVD set was released by Platinum disc corporation with digitally enhanced audio 5.1.

In December 2004, Toonami Digital Arsenal made the shorts available for free download in MP4 format on its website. They posted one episode per day with the final episode, "Secret Agent", going live on New Year's Day 2005.

On July 1, 2008, Warner Bros. released the shorts on iTunes via their DC Comics sections.

On April 7, 2009, a collection of all the cartoons released by Warner Home Video was released as the first authorized collection from the original masters, titled Max Fleischer's Superman: 1941–1942; the set included "The Man, The Myth, Superman" featurette, along with an old special feature seen in the Superman II 2006 DVD release, "First Flight: The Fleischer Superman Series".

The 8-disc Blu-ray boxset The Superman Motion Picture Anthology, released in June 2011, includes all the Max Fleischer cartoons in SD as bonuses on the discs for the two versions of Superman II. The nine Fleischer Studios cartoons plus the 13-minute feature First Flight: The Fleischer Superman Series are on the Superman II – Original 1980/81 Theatrical Release disc and the eight Famous Studios cartoons are on the Superman II – The 2006 Richard Donner Cut disc.

A Blu-ray set containing all the cartoons, called Max Fleischer's Superman: Collector's Edition was released on October 30, 2012, by the Gaiam studio. According to a Blu-Ray.com review, it was upscaled from standard definition to HD, and the set's video quality and audio quality were criticized.

The shorts were available for the first time in true HD on WarnerMedia's DC Universe streaming service. After the service went down in early 2021, they were no longer available.

On May 16, 2023, Warner Bros. Home Entertainment officially released a Blu-ray set containing all 17 Superman cartoons titled Max Fleischer's Superman. All of the cartoons are presented in 1080p resolution based on a 4K scan of the original 35 mm successive exposure negative.

== List of films ==
=== Fleischer Studios ===
Nº	Title	Original release date
1.	Superman	September 26, 1941
2.	The Mechanical Monsters	November 28, 1941
3.	Billion Dollar Limited	January 9, 1942
4.	The Arctic Giant	February 27, 1942
5.	The Bulleteers	March 27, 1942
6.	The Magnetic Telescope	April 24, 1942
7.	Electric Earthquake	May 15, 1942
8.	Volcano	July 10, 1942
9.	Terror on the Midway	August 30, 1942

=== Famous Studios ===
Nº	Title	Original release date
10.	Japoteurs (Note: Although no producer is credited on the original opening title of Japoteurs, the release credit (Paramount) has been restored in the DVD releases: ISBN 1-4198-2395-7 (Fleischer) and ISBN 1-4198-2396-5 (Famous))	September 18, 1942
11.	Showdown	October 16, 1942
12.	Eleventh Hour	November 20, 1942
13.	Destruction, Inc.	December 25, 1942
14.	The Mummy Strikes	February 19, 1943
15.	Jungle Drums	March 26, 1943
16.	The Underground World	June 18, 1943
17.	Secret Agent	July 30, 1943

== See also ==
- List of animated films in the public domain in the United States
