= The Bulleteers =

- Title card from The Bulleteers
- Directed by: Dave Fleischer
- Story by: Bill Turner & Carl Meyer
- Based on: Superman by: Jerry Siegel, Joe Shuster & DC Comics
- Produced by: Max Fleischer
- Starring: Bud Collyer, Joan Alexander, Julian Noa & Jackson Beck
- Music by: Sammy Timberg
- Animation by: Orestes Calpini & Graham Place
- Color process: Technicolor
- Production company: Fleischer Studios
- Distributed by: Paramount Pictures
- Release date: March 27, 1942
- Running time: 8 minutes (one reel)
- Language: English

The Bulleteers (1942) is the fifth of seventeen animated Technicolor short films based upon the DC Comics character of Superman, originally created by Jerry Siegel & Joe Shuster. This animated short was created by Fleischer Studios. The story runs about eight minutes and covers Superman's adventures as he defends the city against a villainous gang called "The Bulleteers", who are equipped with a bullet-shaped rocket car. It was originally released on March 27, 1942.

== Plot ==
Full film

A bullet-shaped rocket car blows through the police department, destroying it. The "Bulleteers", as the press calls the gang piloting the car, demand the mayor turn over the entire funds of the city treasury or other municipal buildings will be next. The mayor defies the threat, so the Bulleteers strike again, destroying the town's power plant. Bullets from defending policemen bounce harmlessly off the bullet car. Lois Lane drives off to the scene, leaving Clark Kent behind. Clark enters a nearby phone booth and dons his Superman costume.

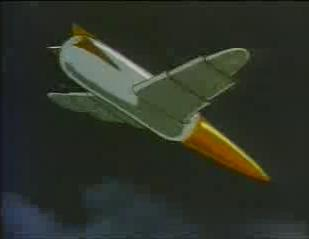
The Bulleteers' Bullet car.

The Bulleteers take aim at the treasury building, but Superman lands in front of them and knocks the rocket car off course. As they struggle to regain control, he leaps in the air and lands on its nose. The Bulleteers shake him off with wild maneuvers. Superman lunges to keep them from the treasury, only to arrive too late. Rubble from the explosion buries him.

Lois Lane climbs over the rubble to see the Bulleteers loading money into their car. She sneaks into its cockpit and tries to smash the controls with a wrench, but the Bulleteers return, taking off with her. Superman emerges from the rubble and chases after the car, grasping it by one of its retractable wings, and then by its tail fins to throw it off course. He crawls to the cockpit, rips it open, and pulls Lois and the three Bulleteers out. The car crashes to the ground, destroying it once and for all.

Reading the newspaper on the next day, Clark congratulates Lois on her scoop on the Bulleteers story. Lois replies, "It was easy, thanks to Superman."

== Cast ==
- Bud Collyer as Clark Kent/Superman, Bulleteer, Police Officer, Printer
- Joan Alexander as Lois Lane
- Julian Noa as Perry White, Mayor
- Jackson Beck as the Narrator

== Appearances ==
- In Superman: Doomsday, the restored bullet car appears as one of Superman's trophies in his Fortress of Solitude.
- The line "We won't be intimidated by criminal threats" has been used in various promos for the action cartoon block Toonami.
