= Superman (1941 film) =

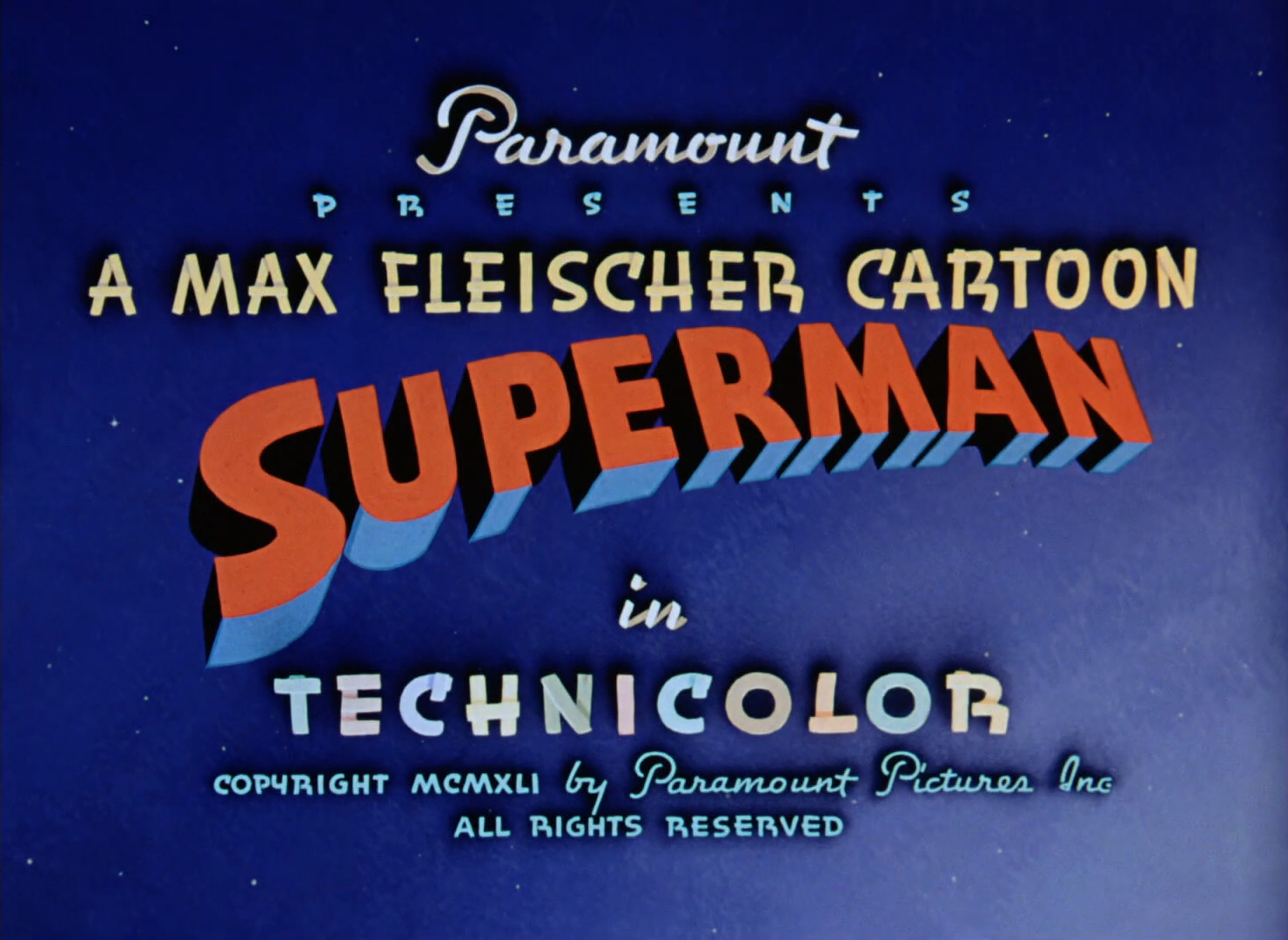
- Title card from Superman
- Directed by: Dave Fleischer
- Story by: Seymour Kneitel; Isadore Sparber
- Based on: Superman by: Jerry Siegel; Joe Shuster
- Produced by: Max Fleischer
- Starring: Bud Collyer; Joan Alexander; Jackson Beck; Jack Mercer
- Music by: Sammy Timberg; Winston Sharples (uncredited); Lou Fleischer (uncredited)
- Animation by: Steve Muffatti; Frank Endres
- Color process: Technicolor
- Production company: Fleischer Studios
- Distributed by: Paramount Pictures
- Release date: September 26, 1941
- Running time: 10 minutes (one reel)
- Language: English

Superman (1941), also known as The Mad Scientist, is the first installment in a series of seventeen animated Technicolor short films based upon the DC Comics character Superman. It was produced by Fleischer Studios and released to theaters by Paramount Pictures on September 26, 1941. Superman ranked number 33 in a list of the fifty greatest cartoons of all time sourced from a 1994 poll of 1000 animation professionals, and was nominated for the 1942 Academy Award for Best Animated Short Subject.

== Plot ==
To best use his powers for good, Superman adopts the disguise of Clark Kent, a reporter at a metropolitan newspaper. An anonymous, vindictive figure referred to in the press as The Mad Scientist mails a note threatening to use his "Electrothanasia-Ray" at midnight to the newspaper's editor, Perry White. Perry tells Clark to help fellow reporter Lois Lane follow up on a lead she has found on The Mad Scientist, but Lois insists on cracking the story on her own.

Lois flies a private plane to the top of a mountain, where The Mad Scientist's secluded laboratory is located. When she knocks at the door, Lois is seized, bound, and gagged by The Mad Scientist, who then demonstrates the Electrothanasia-Ray by destroying a bridge. The coming disaster is reported over radio, and the police alert everyone to stay in their homes. Clark steps into a storage room, changes into Superman, and flies away.

The Mad Scientist has the Electrothanasia-Ray weaken the foundations of a skyscraper, causing it to tip over. Superman arrives and prevents the structure from falling, lifting it to its upright orientation. Superman then pushes the beam away from the base of the skyscraper and fights it back to the source, punching out each pulse as they come. Superman twists the barrel of the Electrothanasia-Ray into a knot, and the buildup of pressure causes it to overheat and explode. As the lab disintegrates, Superman unties Lois and flies her to safety. Superman captures The Mad Scientist and takes him to jail, though his pet vulture escapes. Perry congratulates Lois on getting the scoop on the Mad Scientist, but Lois says it is "thanks to Superman". Clark overhears this and winks at the audience.

== Cast ==
- Bud Collyer as Clark Kent/Superman
- Joan Alexander as Lois Lane
- Jackson Beck as Perry White
- Jack Mercer as The Mad Scientist
- George Lowther or Grant Richards as the Opening Narrator (unconfirmed)

== Production ==
In 1941, Paramount Pictures acquired the film rights to DC Comics' Superman property, created by Jerry Siegel and Joe Shuster. Paramount pitched the idea of producing a Superman series to its animation producer, Fleischer Studios. Co-owner Dave Fleischer did not want to take on the task of producing such a demanding series, so he went up to Paramount and gave them a budget quota of $100,000 per cartoon (four times the cost of an average cartoon), hoping to get Paramount to change its mind about the shorts. Paramount negotiated it down to a production cost of $50,000 for the first cartoon, and $30,000 for subsequent cartoons, and Fleischer Studios began work on the first short in the series, Superman.

Steve Muffatti was placed in charge of the first Superman short (at Fleischer and later Famous, the credited director served the roles typically ascribed to a film producer or supervising director, while the credited animators were the actual animation directors, and the animators and animation assistants were generally not credited at all). Stan Quackenbush handled the sequences of destruction in the city. Superman was produced with the same care and attention to detail the Fleischer staff had given to their first feature film, Gulliver's Travels (1939). While some of the scenes in the cartoon made use of the rotoscope, a Max Fleischer invention which allowed animation drawings to be traced from live action, others were done by relying upon poses sketched from live reference models instead of traced footage. Most of the lead character animators at Fleischer were used to animating caricatured humans and animals, and the assistant animators were tasked with maintaining the figures' realistic proportions. Character shadows, elaborate special effects animation, and detailed animation layouts contributed to the attention to detail evident in Superman and its follow-ups.

A steak being cooked was used for the sound of the Electrothanasia Ray, while the sound of Krypton being destroyed was created by recording someone wrenching an apple apart with their bare hands and then amplifying it.

== Marketing ==
Paramount promoted Superman with a campaign much larger than usually used for an animated short, including coming-attractions trailers. The short was a notable success, and was nominated for the 1942 Academy Award for Best Short Subject (Cartoons), which it lost to the Mickey Mouse cartoon Lend a Paw.

=== Influence ===
This cartoon featured the first time Clark breaks the fourth wall and winks at the audience, in reference to their shared secret that Clark is Superman. This became a regular feature of the Fleischer Superman cartoons and was later introduced to the comics.

The cartoon featured the "Truth and Justice" motto, which eventually became the "Truth, Justice, and the American Way" motto with the premiere of the September 2, 1942 episode of the 1940s Superman radio series and was changed to "Truth, Justice and a Better Tomorrow" in 2021.

== Release ==
Superman was released on September 26, 1941, in U.S. theaters as the first theatrical appearance of Superman.

=== Official release ===
The short was officially released on Blu-ray by Warner Home Video in May 2023.

=== Public domain ===
The rights to the 1941 short and the other sixteen shorts in the Superman series reverted to National Comics (now DC Comics); TV syndication rights were licensed to Flamingo Films, distributors of the 1950s Adventures of Superman TV series. The cartoons fell into the public domain when National Comics failed to renew their copyrights in the late 1960s/early 1970s.
