= Showdown (1942 film) =

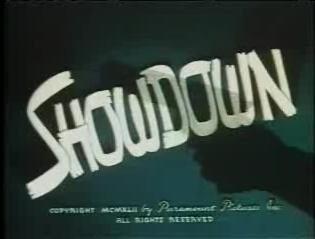
- Title card from Showdown
- Directed by: Isidore Sparber
- Story by: Jay Morton
- Based on: Superman by: Jerry Siegel; Joe Shuster
- Produced by: Sam Buchwald
- Starring: Julian Noa; Lee Royce; Barbara Willock
- Music by: Samuel Timberg
- Animation by: Steve Muffati; Graham Place
- Color process: Technicolor
- Production company: Famous Studios
- Distributed by: Paramount Pictures
- Release date: October 16, 1942
- Running time: 9 minutes (one reel)
- Language: English

Showdown (1942) is the eleventh of seventeen animated Technicolor short films based upon the DC Comics character Superman. Produced by Famous Studios, the cartoon was originally released to theaters by Paramount Pictures on October 16, 1942.

== Plot ==
A big-time crook commits a series of robberies dressed as Superman in order to throw police off the trail, at the orders of a gangster known as the Boss. Every paper in the city reports that Superman has gone bad, but Lois Lane does not believe it to be true. At the Daily Planet, an office boy informs her and Clark Kent that the editor wants them to cover the opera and gives them two tickets.

At the opera, the Superman imposter sneaks from booth to booth, swiping jewelry. When a victim cries out in alarm, Lois leaves her seat and confronts the imposter. In their struggle, Lois rips the "S" patch off the imposter's chest. He runs away. Not having seen his face in the darkness, Lois is now convinced that Superman is the thief. As Lois calls the police, Clark follows the imposter. Police cars surround the building, and the imposter is confronted by the real Superman. The imposter shoots Superman, to no avail. Superman drives the imposter over the edge of the rooftop, then swoops down to save him. In the glow of the searchlights, Lois and the police see there are two Supermen.

Hoping for a lighter punishment, the imposter takes Superman to the Boss. Superman stands in front of the Boss's desk, waiting for him to say something incriminating. Irritated at his silence, the Boss hefts a lamp at him and sees Superman's face. He presses a hidden button that opens a trap door and sends Superman falling into a pit. The Boss and the imposter push the desk over the door and hide in a vault. Superman climbs out and opens the vault, tearing out electrified bars, only to find that the two have used a welding torch to cut a hole in the wall and escape. A police car heads around a bend, unknowing that the criminals are coming at them from the other way. Superman steps in, prevents the cars from crashing, and captures the two criminals.

Back at the Daily Planet, Clark is dozing when Lois returns from the crime scene to start working on the story. Clark tells her that he was dreaming he was Superman. Lois responds, "A fine Superman you'd make." Clark replies, "Well, I can dream, can't I?"

== Voice cast ==
- Lee Royce as Clark Kent/Superman (uncredited)
- Barbara Willock as Lois Lane (uncredited)
- Jack Mercer as office boy (uncredited)
- Carl Meyer as the Superman impostor (uncredited)
- Jackson Beck as The Boss (uncredited)
- Julian Noa as Narrator (uncredited)
