= Secret Agent (1943 film) =

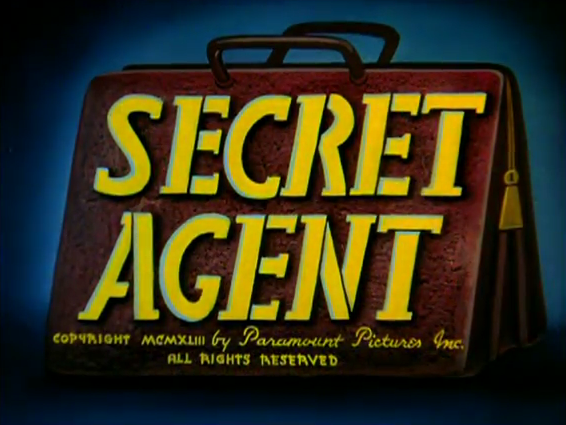
- Title card from Secret Agent
- Directed by: Seymour Kneitel
- Story by: Carl Meyer
- Based on: Superman by: Jerry Siegel; Joe Shuster
- Produced by: Sam Buchwald; Dan Gordon; Seymour Kneitel; Isadore Sparber
- Starring: Jackson Beck; Jack Mercer; Julian Noa; Lee Royce; Barbara Willock
- Music by: Sammy Timberg
- Animation by: Otto Feuer; Steve Muffati
- Color process: Technicolor
- Production company: Famous Studios
- Distributed by: Paramount Pictures
- Release date: July 30, 1943
- Running time: 7 minutes (one reel)
- Language: English

Secret Agent (1943) is the last of seventeen animated Technicolor short films based upon the DC Comics character Superman. Produced by Famous Studios, the cartoon was originally released to theaters by Paramount Pictures on July 30, 1943. This is the only short in which Lois Lane does not appear, although a female federal agent who looks identical to Lois (except with blonde hair) appears.

== Plot ==
Clark Kent, while stopped at a drug store, sees a group of men trying to gun down another car. The gunmen's car crashes into the drug store and they steal Clark's car. Clark dashes to catch up and grabs onto the rear of his car. The two cars pass by a police car which chases them down. The gangsters try to shoot at the police, but Clark grabs the gangster's gun and throws it away. The gangsters use another gun to blow out their victim's tires and speed off, bringing Clark to their superior.

A woman steps out of the damaged car and heads to police headquarters. She explains to the police chief that she needs to take records to Washington, D.C., with the names and plans of some saboteurs. For six months, she worked undercover in the group.

She gets a police escort to the airport, but it is attacked by the saboteurs. The secret agent drives on alone. The saboteurs turn the swing bridge to block her. She realizes that the road is not connected to the bridge and jumps out of the car, which drives off the bridge and crashes into an electrical tower. The agent gets to the bridge controls and reverses the bridge's turning, but the electric tower falls into the control room. She falls onto the bridge's turning mechanism and is knocked out. The massive gear in the turning mechanism creeps towards her.

A saboteur telephones his superior and tells him that the agent is trapped on the bridge but is cut off as the police open fire on him. The saboteurs leave to get the agent's records. Clark breaks his bindings, changes into Superman, pulls up on the cable of the elevator the saboteurs are taking, and ties off the cable with the saboteurs above the top floor. Superman flies to the bridge and stops the bridge. He flies the agent to Washington, D.C., and flies away, with a salute to the flag of the United States.

== Voice cast ==
- Lee Royce as Clark Kent/Superman, Nazi Saboteurs
- Barbara Willock as Secret Agent
- Jackson Beck as the Narrator, Police Chief, Nazi Saboteurs
- Julian Noa as Perry White, Police Officer, Nazi Saboteurs
- Jack Mercer as Nazi Saboteurs
