= The Arctic Giant =

1942 film

- Directed by: Dave Fleischer
- Story by: Bill Turner; Ted Pierce
- Based on: Superman by: Jerry Siegel; Joe Shuster
- Produced by: Max Fleischer
- Starring: Bud Collyer; Joan Alexander; Jackson Beck; Julian Noa
- Music by: Sammy Timberg; Winston Sharples (uncredited); Lou Fleischer (uncredited)
- Animation by: Willard Bowsky; Reuben Grossman
- Color process: Technicolor
- Production company: Fleischer Studios
- Distributed by: Paramount Pictures
- Release date: February 27, 1942
- Running time: 9 minutes (one reel)
- Language: English

The Arctic Giant is the fourth of seventeen animated Technicolor short films based upon the DC Comics character of Superman, created by Jerry Siegel & Joe Shuster. This animated short was created by Fleischer Studios. The story runs nine minutes and covers Superman's adventures in defeating a giant defrosted dinosaur that terrorizes the city. It was released on February 27, 1942. The short depicts a Godzilla-esque scenario while predating the 1954 film by 12 years.

== Plot ==
Full film

Archeologists uncover a giant dinosaur creature that was considered an "Arctic Giant" frozen in perfect condition in Siberia, and bring it to the Museum of Natural Science in Metropolis where it was claimed to be a Tyrannosaurus. It is kept frozen using special refrigeration equipment in a special wing of the Museum of Natural Science. After a call from a professor, Perry White sends Lois Lane to do a story on the Arctic Giant exhibit where there is a chance that it might still be alive if the ice around it melted. Clark Kent offers to come with her, but Lois turns him down, saying he might faint at the sight of the creature.

While Lois is shown around the museum's refrigeration plant, a carelessly placed oil can falls into the turbine. The workers turn off the equipment so they can repair the damage, and the temperature rises melting the ice around the Arctic Giant as the museum patrons are evacuated by the security guards. The revived Arctic Giant destroys the entire building, leaving Lois in the rubble. Police attempt to shoot it down, but the bullets have no effect as the Arctic Giant crushes their cars under its foot and begins to wreak havoc in the city.

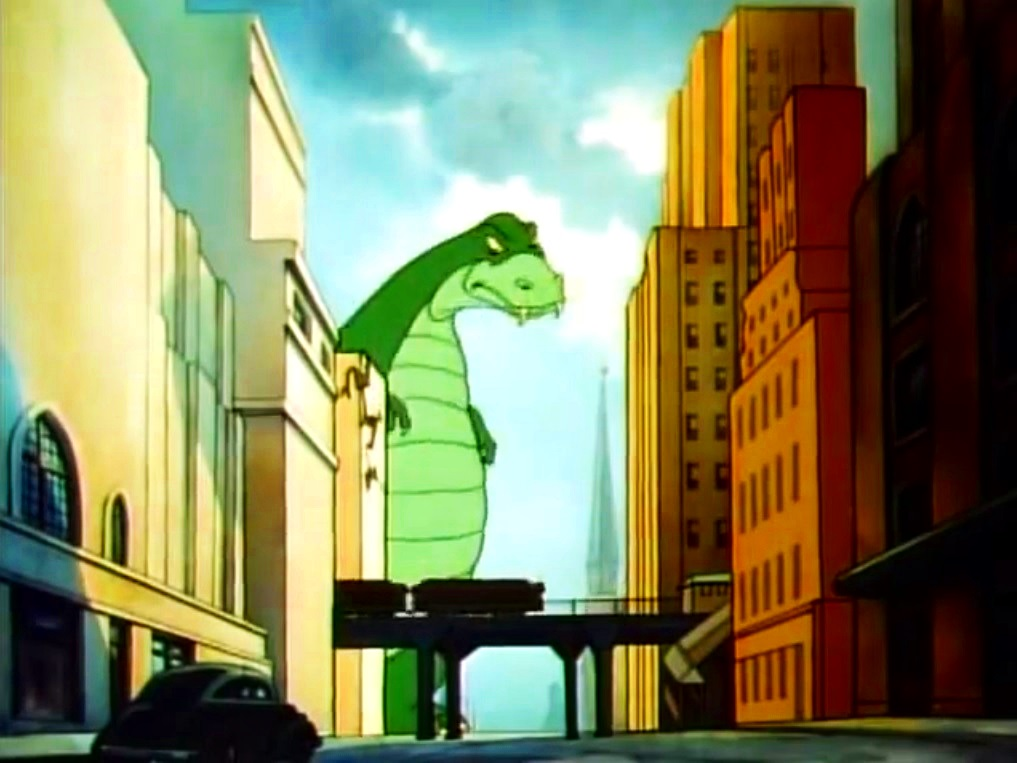
The "Arctic Giant" rampages in the city.

Word of the museum disaster reaches the Daily Planet. Clark uses a closet to change into Superman and hurries over to the museum to rescue Lois and the other visitors from the rubble. He tells Lois to get to safety and she assures him she will, but in fact has no intention of abandoning the story.

After the Arctic Giant destroys a dam neighboring a town, Superman stops the flood by pushing a giant boulder in to fill the gap. Police and firefighters try and fail to stop the Arctic Giant as it breaks through a suspension bridge, endangering several motorists. Superman catches the falling bridge and ties it back together as the Arctic Giant approaches a packed stadium. Superman uses one of the bridge cables to lasso the legs of the Arctic Giant, causing it to fall, crushing cars and a gas station on the way down. While Superman ties up the Arctic Giant, Lois approaches to take a photo of the fallen Arctic Giant, but almost gets eaten. Superman flies into its mouth and saves Lois, and then pins the head of the Arctic Giant down with a lamp post, ending the danger.

A news article by Lois Lane states that Superman subdued the Arctic Giant which is being held at the Metropolis Zoo as a picture shows it in its exhibit restrained with strong shackles. Clark commends Lois for her courage in getting the story. Lois asks where he was during the crisis, Clark replies "Me? Oh, I must have fainted." Then he winks to the viewers.

== Cast ==
- Bud Collyer as Clark Kent/Superman, Reactor Worker #1, Police Officer #1, Police Dispatcher
- Joan Alexander as Lois Lane, Female Pedestrian
- Julian Noa as Perry White, Male Pedestrian, Police Officer #2
- Jackson Beck as the Narrator, Reactor Worker #2

== Production ==
The sequences where Superman leaps from rooftop to rooftop were produced as test scenes during the initial series development, but this dynamic was discarded as "silly looking" at that time and the Superman cartoons generally depicted Superman flying from place to place instead. Journalist Will Murray suggested that the discarded footage was probably utilized for "The Arctic Giant" as a cost-saving measure.
