= Terror on the Midway =

1942 film by Dave Fleischer

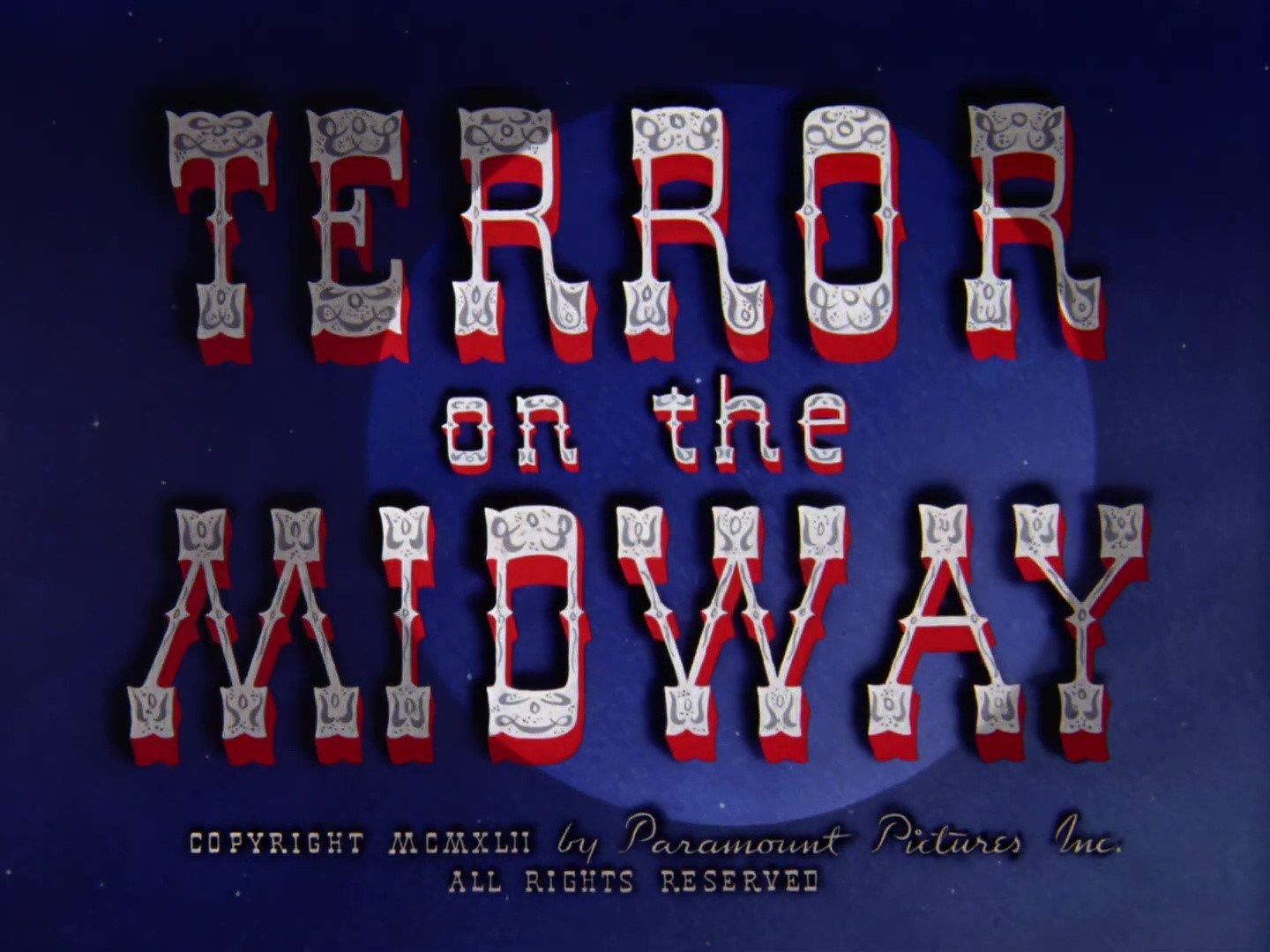
- Title card from Terror on the Midway
- Directed by: Dave Fleischer
- Story by: Dan Gordon; Jay Morton
- Based on: Superman by: Jerry Siegel; Joe Shuster
- Produced by: Max Fleischer
- Starring: Bud Collyer; Joan Alexander; Jack Mercer; Jackson Beck
- Music by: Sammy Timberg; Winston Sharples
- Animation by: Orestes Calpini; Jimmy Davis
- Color process: Technicolor
- Production company: Fleischer Studios
- Distributed by: Paramount Pictures
- Release date: August 28, 1942
- Running time: 8 minutes (one reel)
- Language: English

Terror on the Midway (1942) is the ninth of seventeen animated Technicolor short films based upon the DC Comics character Superman, originally created by Jerry Siegel & Joe Shuster. It was the final Paramount cartoon short by Fleischer Studios. The eight-minute short features Superman attempting to stop the chaos created when several circus animals escape their cages and restraints, including a giant gorilla named Gigantic. It was originally released on August 28, 1942, by Paramount Pictures.

== Plot ==
Full film

Clark Kent and Lois Lane are at a midway to cover its events. She expresses her regret that she did not have a more exciting assignment. Clark leaves for his own assignment as the show begins.

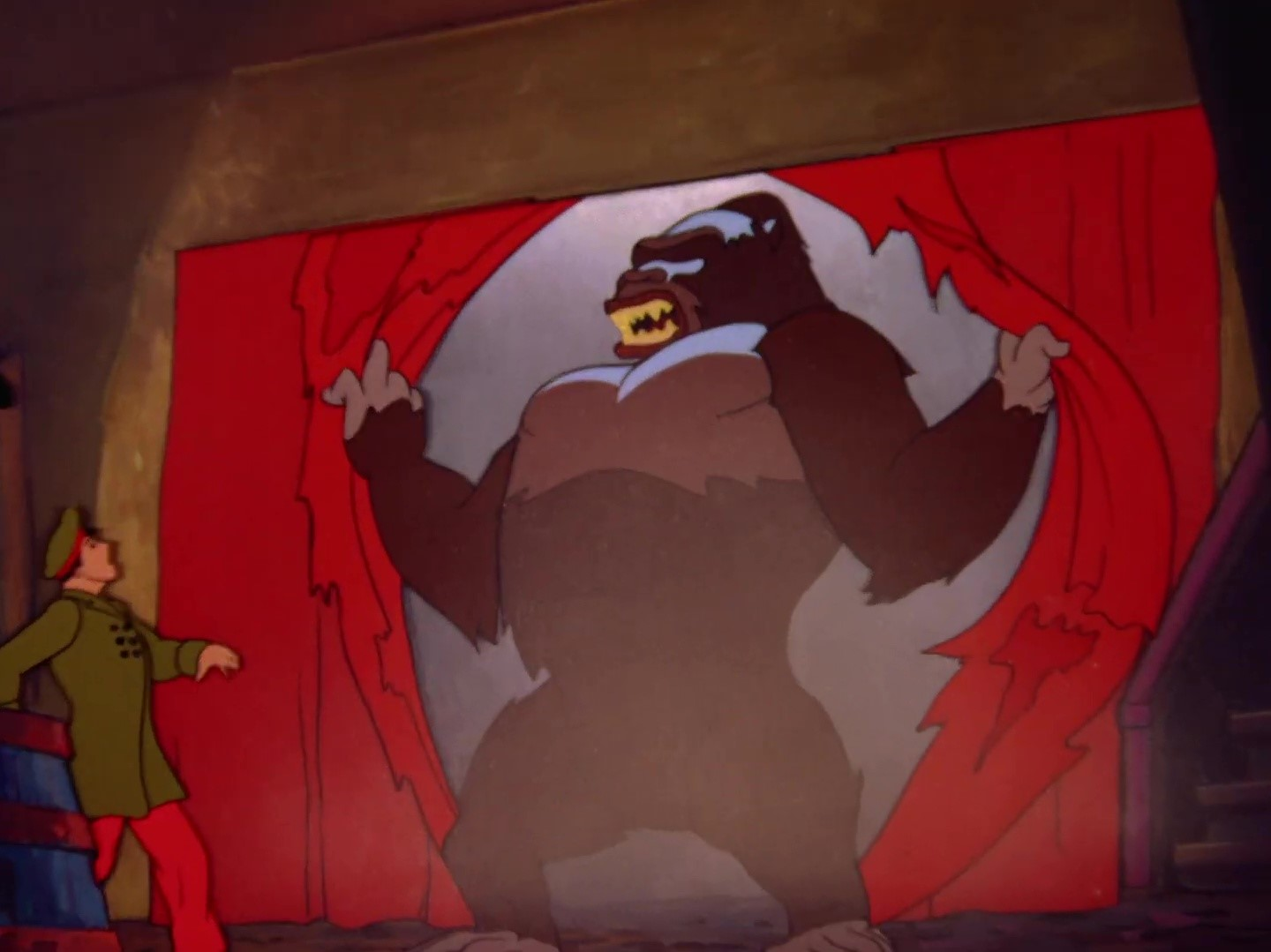
The giant gorilla "Gigantic" escapes from its cage.

Later that night, a monkey wanders from the main tent and accidentally opens the cage of a giant gorilla, Gigantic. Growling, Gigantic sends everyone into pandemonium. Circus workers attempt to tie Gigantic down with ropes but are overpowered and forced to flee. While the workers struggle to keep the animals under control, some of the elephants stampede, or rear up against their owners, knocking other cages open.

Outside the Daily Planet, Clark hears police cars. He follows them in a taxicab. Back at the circus, Lois takes pictures of Gigantic and the fleeing attendees. She notices Gigantic lumbering toward a young girl who emerged from the wrecked cart. She lifts the girl out of the ring but Gigantic then chases after Lois.

Clark and the police arrive but are unable to subdue the elephants, so he changes into his Superman costume and begins returning the elephants, lions, and black panther to their cages. He hears a scream: Lois is trapped at the top of a tent pole and Gigantic is climbing towards her. Superman tries to get her to safety but Gigantic seizes him. Struggling, they fall from the pole, knocking over the ladder, which then hits a power circuit, starting a fire. When Gigantic is distracted by the burning tent pole snapping, Superman deals him a subduing blow and ties him up in a safety net. Lois slips from the falling pole, but Superman flies up and catches her. He then smothers the fire with his cape.

Later, at the Daily Planet, Lois types the story, and Clark comments that she was lucky to get the kind of story she wanted in the end. But when Lois states it was lucky that she lived to write it, Clark reminds her that she manages to survive, thanks to Superman.

== Voice cast ==
- Bud Collyer as Clark Kent/Superman
- Joan Alexander as Lois Lane
- Jackson Beck as the Narrator
- Jack Mercer as Sideshow Barker
