= Destruction, Inc. =

Destruction Inc.
- Title card from Destruction Inc.
- Directed by: Isadore Sparber
- Story by: Jay Morton
- Based on: Superman by: Jerry Siegel; Joe Shuster
- Produced by: Sam Buchwald; Dan Gordon; Seymour Kneitel; Isadore Sparber
- Starring: Jackson Beck; Jack Mercer; Julian Noa; Lee Royce; Barbara Willock
- Music by: Winston Sharples; Sammy Timberg
- Animation by: Thomas Moore; David Tendlar
- Color process: Technicolor
- Production company: Famous Studios
- Distributed by: Paramount Pictures
- Release date: December 25, 1942
- Running time: 9 minutes (one reel)
- Language: English

Destruction Inc. (1942) is the thirteenth of seventeen animated Technicolor short films based upon the DC Comics character Superman. Produced by Famous Studios, the cartoon was originally released to theaters by Paramount Pictures on December 25, 1942.

== Plot ==
Full film

The elderly night watchman from the Metropolis Munitions Works is found dead in a swamp. Lois Lane and Clark Kent both decide to grab the story. Clark talks to Lois, not realizing she has left and that he is talking to a bus driver named Louis. Louis gets angry at what he thinks was a mistake about his name. As Lois goes undercover at the plant after being hired by the plant supervisor. She meets the new night guard, a mild-mannered old man leaving the Personnel MGR office.

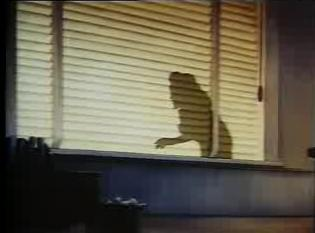
Lois overhears Mr. Jones's plan to blow up the factory.

Posing as a factory worker, Lois overhears the foreman informing two of the workers that Mr. Jones, one of the supervisors, wants them in his office upstairs at 12. Lois follows them to Mr. Jones' office and hears Jones' plan to blow up the factory as the switch to the night lights has been rigged to a case of dynamite. The workers killed the night watchman to cover their tracks. Jones sees Lois's silhouette outside the office window and sends the workers to catch her. Lois gets away from the workers across a window ledge and beams but is caught by the foreman. She is gagged and loaded inside a test torpedo with another case of dynamite. The night guard enters the room and rushes to help Lois, but the foreman drops tons of scrap metal on him, burying him.

The torpedo is sent to the testing range and fired at a dummy ship. The night guard frees himself from the rubble, now wearing his Superman costume, having posed undercover. Superman rushes out to the testing range and catches the torpedo before it can hit the ship. He frees Lois, who tells him that Jones plans to blow up the plant. Superman stops the foreman from throwing the night guard's switch, but is occupied in combat by the workers. Jones steers a truck loaded with dynamite toward the factory, then jumps out. Lois warns Superman about the truck, and he flies into the cab and drives the truck over a cliff, saving the factory.

Jones, the foreman, and the workers are arrested for their crimes, and Lois reveals that she knew Clark was the night guard all along.

== Voice cast ==
- Lee Royce as Clark Kent/Superman
- Barbara Willock as Lois Lane
- Jackson Beck as Chief Thug, Narrator
- Jack Mercer as Radio Newscaster, Louis the bus driver
- Julian Noa as the Narrator
