= Japoteurs =

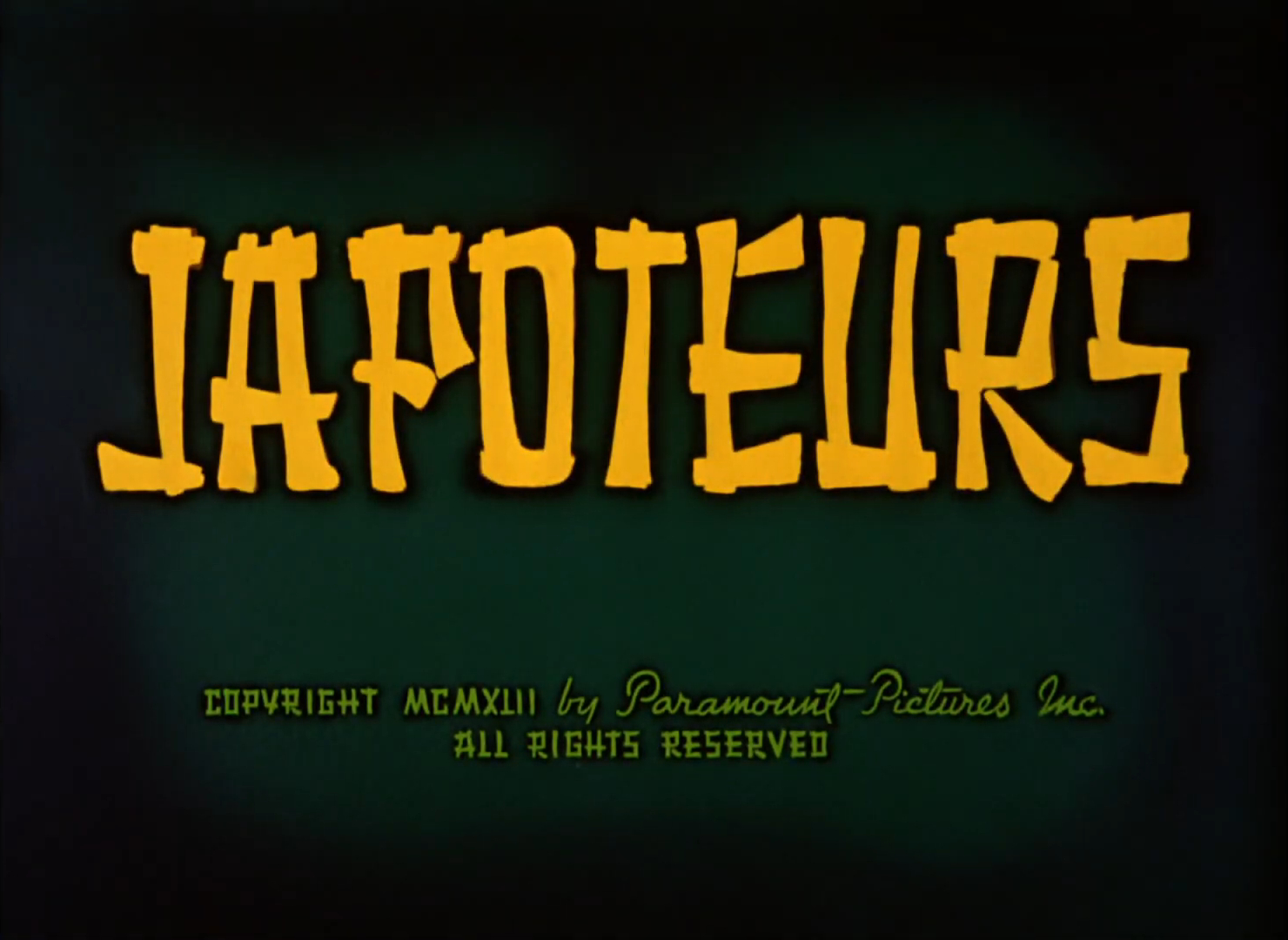
- Title card
- Directed by: Seymour Kneitel
- Story by: Bill Turner; Carl Meyer
- Based on: Superman by: Jerry Siegel; Joe Shuster
- Produced by: Sam Buchwald
- Starring: Lee Royce; Barbara Willock; Jackson Beck; Jack Mercer
- Music by: Sammy Timberg
- Animation by: Myron Waldman; Nicholas Tafuri
- Color process: Technicolor
- Production company: Famous Studios
- Distributed by: Paramount Pictures
- Release date: September 18, 1942
- Running time: 9 minutes (one reel)
- Language: English

Japoteurs (1942) is the tenth of seventeen animated Technicolor short films based upon the DC Comics character Superman, created by Jerry Siegel and Joe Shuster. The first Superman cartoon produced by Famous Studios (the successor to Fleischer Studios), Japoteurs covers Superman's adventures stopping Japanese spies from hijacking a bomber plane and bringing it to Tokyo. This cartoon does not bear the Famous Studios name because that company had not yet been fully organized after Max Fleischer was removed by Paramount Pictures from the studio which bore his name. The cartoon was originally released to theaters by Paramount Pictures on September 18, 1942. Japoteurs was the first Famous Studios cartoon filmed in color.

The word "Japoteur" is a portmanteau of the words "Japanese" and "saboteur".

== Plot ==
Full film

A group of Japanese spies hijack a new prototype bomber plane by taking out the nighttime guards, hiding inside empty bomb shells, and emerging to take out and replace the pilots as the plane prepares for its maiden flight. While Clark Kent and Lois Lane are taking a tour of the bomber plane for the Daily Planet, Lois stows away in a locker.

When Lois emerges from her hiding place and heads to the cockpit, she notices that the Japanese spies have hijacked the plane. She calls for help on the radio, and fighter planes are sent to stop the hijackers. In response, the hijackers deploy a bomb, which stops the fighters from taking off. Clark Kent goes into an elevator and changes into Superman as it goes up to the roof.

Superman enters the plane to stop the hijackers, but one of them has Lois tied up and threatens to drop her out through the bomb hatch. Superman jumps out of the plane and comes back in through the bomb hatch to save Lois. He unties her and fights the hijackers. One of them breaks the plane's controls, and the plane starts falling towards the city. Superman takes Lois down to the ground, then flies back up and catches the plane, bringing it to a safe landing right in the middle of the street.

Later, Clark and Lois ride a rotating plane ride at an amusement park, but Lois says she would rather be with Superman.

== Influences ==
The cartoon, and the stereotypical Japanese characters in particular, are done in a style typical of American propaganda during World War II. Many cartoons of the time followed a similar vein, such as the Schlesinger/Warner Bros. cartoons Scrap Happy Daffy (1943), Daffy - The Commando (1943), and Herr Meets Hare (1945). Such films typically show Japanese and German characters in a negative light as the American hero makes short work of them.

== Voice cast ==
- Lee Royce as Clark Kent / Superman
- Barbara Willock as Lois Lane
- Jackson Beck as the Narrator
- Jack Mercer as the Press Tour Guide, Japanese Hijacker

== See also ==
- List of World War II short films
