= Eleventh Hour (1942 animated film) =

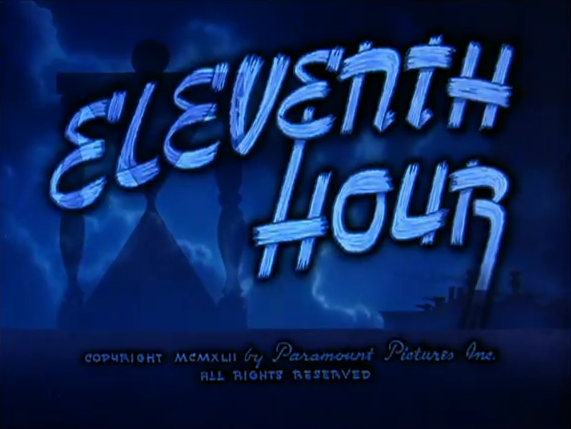
- Title card from Eleventh Hour
- Directed by: Dan Gordon
- Story by: Carl Meyer; Bill Turner
- Based on: Superman by: Jerry Siegel; Joe Shuster
- Produced by: Sam Buchwald; Dan Gordon; Seymour Kneitel; Isidore Sparber
- Music by: Sammy Timberg
- Animation by: Willard Bowsky; William Henning
- Color process: Technicolor
- Production company: Famous Studios
- Distributed by: Paramount Pictures
- Release date: November 20, 1942
- Running time: 8 minutes (one reel)
- Language: English

Eleventh Hour is the twelfth of seventeen animated Technicolor short films based upon the DC Comics character Superman. Produced by Famous Studios, the cartoon was originally released to theaters by Paramount Pictures on November 20, 1942.

== Plot ==
Full film

While Clark Kent and Lois Lane are kept under house arrest as prisoners of war in the Japanese city of Yokohama, Superman becomes a saboteur. Every night, when the Eleventh Hour strikes, Superman destroys a ship or bridge and returns to his quarters through a window, putting the barred grille back in place.

Superman is careful to avoid being spotted and identified during these expeditions. However, one night Lois sees him leaping between buildings. She says to Clark (not knowing he is not in his room) that the saboteur is Superman. Her guards overhear this and realize they can use Lois as a hostage. Notices are put up saying 'Warning! Superman: One more act of sabotage and the American girl reporter will be executed at once!'.

Unaware of the threat, Superman sends another ship into the sea, but becomes buried under steel girders. Meanwhile, Lois is taken out for execution. As Superman digs himself out he sees one of the notices. He is fired upon but leaps away. He shields Lois from the bullets, defeats the executioners, and flies away with her. On a ship landing in America, Lois is interviewed. She tells the reporters Clark is still a prisoner, but Superman promised to look after him. The sabotage in Japan continues.
