= The Underground World =

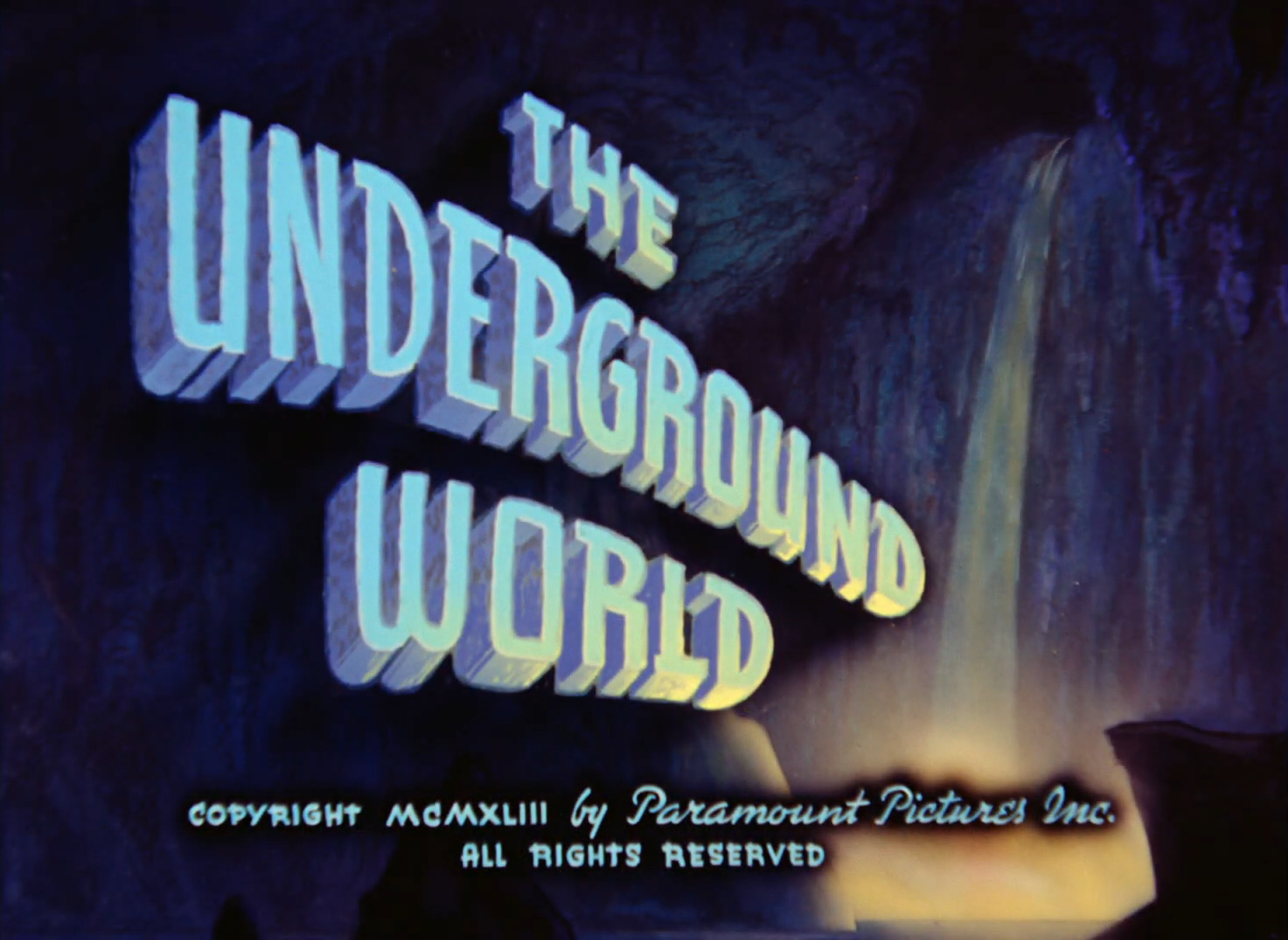
- Title card from The Underground World
- Directed by: Seymour Kneitel
- Story by: Jay Morton
- Based on: Superman by: Jerry Siegel; Joe Shuster
- Produced by: Sam Buchwald
- Starring: Julian Noa; Jackson Beck; Lee Royce; Barbara Willock
- Music by: Sammy Timberg
- Animation by: Reuben Grossman; Nicholas Tafuri
- Color process: Technicolor
- Production company: Famous Studios
- Distributed by: Paramount Pictures
- Release date: June 18, 1943
- Running time: 8 minutes (one reel)
- Language: English

The Underground World (1943) is the sixteenth of seventeen animated Technicolor short films based upon the DC Comics character Superman. Directed by Seymour Kneitel and produced by Famous Studios, the cartoon was originally released to theaters by Paramount Pictures on June 18, 1943.

== Plot ==
An explorer, Dr. Henderson, has a proposition for Perry White. More than 40 years earlier, Dr. Henderson's father disappeared while exploring a series of caverns that he named the "Henderson caves". Henderson wants the Daily Planet to co-finance an expedition into the Henderson caves in exchange for exclusive rights to the story. White agrees.

The caverns are part of a river system, so the only way into the caverns is by boat. Lois and Henderson take the first boat and Clark follows later. Lois and Henderson row into a large grotto. They dock on the side of the river, but once they finish unpacking, the boat drifts off down the river. A sack of dynamite in the boat is ignited by a waterfall and explodes.

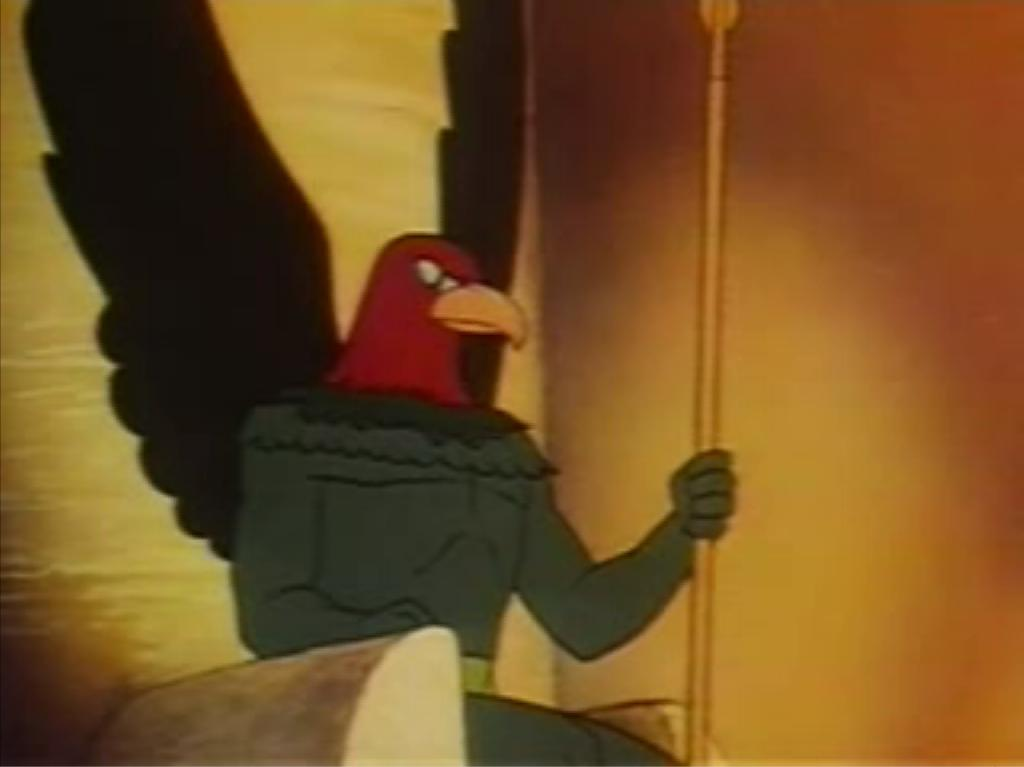
One of the hawk men.

Henderson and Lois are captured by a race of hawk men living in the caverns. The explosion blasted open a hole in their cave, giving them a passage to the surface. Henderson and Lois are brought before a statue of Henderson's father. Neither of them understands why the hawk men have a statue like that. Lois and Henderson are tied to a stone slab and lowered into a giant pot of a bubbling, liquid gold. Seeing the liquid, Lois realizes where the statue of Henderson's father came from: the hawk men coated him in gold. Clark finds them and changes into Superman, but is swarmed by hawk men. Once he is finished with the hawk men, he saves Lois and Henderson and gets them out of the cave. The hawk men fly after them, but Superman uses more dynamite to cover the entrance to the cave with rubble.

Back at the Daily Planet, Perry is impressed by Clark and Lois's findings, but comments that no one would believe the story. As Lois and Clark watch in dismay, Perry burns the report and the photograph of the cave-in.

== Voice cast ==
- Lee Royce as Clark Kent / Superman
- Barbara Willock as Lois Lane
- Julian Noa as Perry White
- Jackson Beck as the Narrator, Dr. Henderson
