= Jungle Drums =

- Title card from Jungle Drums
- Directed by: Dan Gordon
- Story by: Jay Morton; Robert Little
- Based on: Superman by: Jerry Siegel; Joe Shuster
- Produced by: Sam Buchwald
- Starring: Jackson Beck; Julian Noa; Lee Royce; Barbara Willock
- Music by: Winston Sharples; Sammy Timberg
- Animation by: Orestes Calpini; H.C. Ellison
- Color process: Technicolor
- Production company: Famous Studios
- Distributed by: Paramount Pictures
- Release date: March 26, 1943
- Running time: 8 minutes (one reel)
- Language: English

Jungle Drums (1943) is the fifteenth of seventeen animated Technicolor short films based upon the DC Comics character of Superman. Produced by Famous Studios, the cartoon was originally released to theaters by Paramount Pictures on March 26, 1943.

== Plot ==
Full film

Deep in the African jungle, a tribe of aboriginal warriors are having a celebration. Their leader is secretly a Nazi commander, and the tribe's temple is actually an underground Nazi outpost. The Nazis await the arrival of an American convoy with information about an Allied attack. When a military plane flies overhead, the Nazis shoot it down. The commander sends the warriors to search for survivors. At the wreck site, a mortally wounded Lieutenant Fleming hands his secret documents to the crew's only survivor, Lois Lane. He tells her to destroy the documents, but she is immediately caught by the natives. She frees herself, then runs into the jungle and hides the documents under a rock. She is captured and brought back to the temple. When she refuses to tell the location of the papers, the commander orders the warriors to burn her at the stake.

Meanwhile, Clark Kent and another pilot fly out to meet Lois's convoy. They spot the wrecked plane near the aboriginal village. Clark parachutes down to investigate. Once on the ground, he changes into Superman. Lois is being burned at the stake with the commander watching her, and a warrior recovers the documents Lois hid. The commander has his men radio headquarters and send Nazi U-boats to attack the Allied fleet.

Superman arrives and saves Lois from burning to death. When the warriors see a man who can walk through fire, they run in terror. The Nazi soldiers fight back against Superman. Lois takes a white cloak from a Nazi killed in the fight and sneaks in to use the radio. The commander catches her, but Superman comes to her rescue. She sends a message to the American headquarters, warning them about the Nazi subs. Before they can attack, the Nazi subs are bombed by a squadron of Allied B-26 bombers sent in response to Lois' warnings. The subs are destroyed, and the Allied fleet is saved.

In Berlin, Adolf Hitler listens to a newsflash about the defeat of the U-boat force. Angered, he changes the radio station to the tune "Praise the Lord and Pass the Ammunition".

== Reception ==
On April 29, 1943, The Film Daily said: "It's all wild, woolly, and in two words, in credible!"

== Voice cast ==
- Lee Royce as Clark Kent / Superman
- Barbara Willock as Lois Lane
- Jackson Beck as the Narrator
- Jack Mercer as First Pilot, Lt. Fleming
- Julian Noa as German Commander
