= List of television series based on DC Comics publications =

Current DC Studios logo

Below is a list of television series based on properties of DC Comics. This list includes live-action and animated series.

== Live-action ==
Title	Seasons	Episodes	Original airing	Production company	Network(s)	Notes	Ref.
Adventures of Superman	6	104	1952–1958	National Comics Publications / Motion Pictures for Television	Syndication		
Batman	3	120	1966–1968	20th Century-Fox Television / Greenway Productions	ABC		
Shazam!	3	28	1974–1976	Filmation / DC Comics	CBS		
The Secrets of Isis	2	22	1975–1976	Filmation	CBS		
Wonder Woman	3	60 (with pilots)	1975–1979	Warner Bros. Television / DC Comics / The Douglas S. Cramer Co. / Bruce Lansbury Productions, Ltd.	ABC (season 1); CBS (seasons 2–3)		
Superboy	4	100	1988–1992	DC Comics / Alexander and Ilya Salkind Productions / Cantharus Productions / Lowry Productions	Syndication		
Swamp Thing	3	72	1990–1993	MCA Television Entertainment / BBK Productions, Inc. / Batfilm Productions, Inc.	USA Network		
The Flash	1	22	1990–1991	Warner Bros. Television / Pet Fly Productions	CBS	Arrowverse adjacent (Note: This show or a character from this show was made canon to the Arrowverse either retroactively or via a crossover event. See List of DC Multiverse worlds § Arrowverse for further information.)	
Human Target	1	7	1992	Warner Bros. Television / Pet Fly Productions	ABC		
Lois & Clark: The New Adventures of Superman	4	88	1993–1997	Warner Bros. Television / December 3 Productions / Gangbuster Films Inc. / Roundelay Productions	ABC		
Smallville	10	217	2001–2011	Warner Bros. Television / DC Comics / Tollin/Robbins Productions / Millar Gough Ink	The WB (seasons 1–5); The CW (seasons 6–10)	Arrowverse adjacent	
Birds of Prey	1	13	2002–2003	Warner Bros. Television / Tollin/Robbins Productions	The WB	Arrowverse adjacent	
Human Target	2	25	2010–2011	Warner Bros. Television / DC Entertainment / Wonderland Sound and Vision	Fox / CTV (Canada, S1)		
Arrow	8	170	2012–2020	Warner Bros. Television / DC Entertainment / Berlanti Productions	The CW	Part of the Arrowverse	
Gotham	5	100	2014–2019	Warner Bros. Television / DC Entertainment / Primrose Hill Productions	Fox		
The Flash	9	184	2014–2023	Warner Bros. Television / DC Entertainment / Berlanti Productions	The CW	Part of the Arrowverse	
Constantine	1	13	2014–2015	Warner Bros. Television / DC Entertainment / Ever After Productions / Phantom Four Films	NBC	Part of the Arrowverse	
Supergirl	6	126	2015–2021	Warner Bros. Television / DC Entertainment / Berlanti Productions	CBS (season 1); The CW (seasons 2–6)	Part of the Arrowverse	
Legends of Tomorrow	7	110	2016–2022	Warner Bros. Television / DC Entertainment / Berlanti Productions	The CW	Part of the Arrowverse	
Powerless	1	12	2017	Warner Bros. Television / DC Entertainment / Ehsugadee Productions	NBC (episodes 1–9); TVNZ On Demand (episodes 10–12)		
Black Lightning	4	58	2018–2021	Warner Bros. Television / DC Entertainment / Berlanti Productions / Akil Productions	The CW	Part of the Arrowverse	
Krypton	2	20	2018–2019	Warner Horizon Television / DC Entertainment / Phantom Four Films	Syfy		
Titans	4	49	2018–2023	Warner Bros. Television / DC Entertainment / Weed Road Pictures / Berlanti Productions	DC Universe (seasons 1–2); HBO Max (seasons 3–4)	Arrowverse adjacent	
Doom Patrol	4	46	2019–2023	Warner Bros. Television / DC Entertainment / Berlanti Productions / Jeremy Carver Productions	DC Universe (seasons 1–2); HBO Max (seasons 2–4)	Arrowverse adjacent	
Swamp Thing	1	10	2019	Warner Bros. Television / DC Entertainment / Big Shoe Productions, Inc. / Atomic Monster	DC Universe		
Pennyworth	3	30	2019–2022	Warner Horizon Television / DC Entertainment / Primrose Hill Productions	Epix (seasons 1–2); HBO Max (season 3)	Set in the same universe as Gotham.	
Batwoman	3	51	2019–2022	Warner Bros. Television / DC Entertainment / Berlanti Productions	The CW	Part of the Arrowverse	
Watchmen	1	9	2019	Warner Bros. Television / DC Entertainment / Paramount Television / White Rabbit	HBO		
Stargirl	3	39	2020–2022	Warner Bros. Television / DC Entertainment / Mad Ghost Productions / Berlanti Productions	DC Universe (season 1); The CW (seasons 1–3)	Arrowverse adjacent	
Superman & Lois	4	53	2021–2024	Warner Bros. Television / DC Entertainment / Berlanti Productions	The CW	Arrowverse adjacent. (Note: Initially conceived as a spin-off set in the Arrowverse, the series' second season finale established it in its own adjacent universe.)	
Naomi	1	13	2022	Warner Bros. Television / DC Entertainment / Array Filmworks	The CW		
Peacemaker	2	16	2022–2025	Warner Bros. Television / DC Films (season 1) / DC Studios (season 2) / Troll Court Entertainment / The Safran Company	HBO Max	Part of the DC Extended Universe/DC Universe.	
Gotham Knights	1	13	2023	Warner Bros. Television / DC Entertainment/ Berlanti Productions	The CW		
The Penguin	1	8	2024	Warner Bros. Television / DC Studios / 6th & Idaho Motion Picture Company / Dylan Clark Productions / Acid and Tender Productions / Chapel Place Productions / Zobot Objects	HBO	Miniseries. Set in the same universe as The Batman.	
Ongoing
Lanterns	1	8	2026–present	Warner Bros. Television / DC Studios / Man, Woman & Child Productions	HBO	Part of the DC Universe.	
Upcoming
The People v. Gorilla Grodd	1	8	2027	Warner Bros. Television / DC Studios	HBO Max	Part of the DC Universe. Filming.	

=== From DC Imprints ===
==== Vertigo ====
Title	Seasons	Episodes	Original airing	Production company	Network(s)	Notes	Ref.
iZombie	5	71	2015–2019	Warner Bros. Television / Vertigo (DC Entertainment) / Spondoolie Productions	The CW		
Lucifer	6	93	2016–2021	Warner Bros. Television / Vertigo (DC Entertainment) / Jerry Bruckheimer Television	Fox (seasons 1–3); Netflix (seasons 4–6)	Arrowverse adjacent	
Preacher	4	43	2016–2019	Sony Pictures Television / AMC Studios / Woodbridge Productions / Short Drive Entertainment / Point Grey Pictures / Original Film / Kickstart Productions / KFL Nightsky Productions	AMC		
Sweet Tooth	3	24	2021–2024	Warner Bros. Television / DC Entertainment / Team Downey / Nightshade	Netflix		
Y: The Last Man	1	10	2021	FXP / Color Force / Future Investigations / Witch's Mark Productions	FX on Hulu (United States); Disney+ (International)		
DMZ	1	4	2022	Warner Bros. Television / DC Entertainment / ARRAY Filmworks	HBO Max	Miniseries	
The Sandman	2	23	2022–2025	Warner Bros. Television / DC Entertainment / Phantom Four / PurePop Inc. / The Blank Corporation	Netflix		
Bodies	1	8	2023	Moonage Pictures	Netflix	Miniseries	
Dead Boy Detectives	1	8	2024	Warner Bros. Television / DC Entertainment / Berlanti Productions / Ghost Octopus	Netflix	Set in the same universe as The Sandman.	

=== TV specials ===
Title	Year	Network	Notes
It's a Bird... It's a Plane... It's Superman	1975	ABC	
Legends of the Superheroes	1979	NBC	2 TV specials
Superman's 50th Anniversary	1988	CBS	
Return to the Batcave: The Misadventures of Adam and Burt	2003	CBS	90 mins

=== Pilots ===
Title	Year	Network	Notes
The Adventures of Superpup	1958		Unaired
The Adventures of Superboy	1961		Unaired
Who's Afraid of Diana Prince?	1967	ABC	Unaired
Batgirl	1967	ABC	Unaired
Wonder Woman	1974	ABC	Passed
Human Target	1990	ABC	Unaired. Footage and script from this were reused for the 1992 version's pilot.
The Flash	1990	CBS	
Justice League of America	1997	CBS	Passed
Global Frequency	2005	The WB	Passed, based on comic published by Wildstorm
Aquaman	2006	The WB	Passed
Wonder Woman	2011	NBC	Unaired
Scalped	2017	WGN America	Passed, based on the comic published by Vertigo
Green Arrow & The Canaries	2020	The CW	Backdoor pilot aired as part of Arrow's eighth season, Passed.
Painkiller	2021	The CW	Backdoor pilot aired as part of Black Lightning's fourth season, Passed.

=== Unscripted ===
Title	Seasons	Episodes	Original airing	Production company	Network(s)	Notes	Ref.
DC Daily	—N/a	450	2018–2020	Warner Bros. Television	DC Universe	Daily news show	
DC Universe All Star Games	1	6	2020	Warner Bros. Television	DC Universe	Game show	

=== Television commercials ===
Commercial	Year	Company	Notes
Superman Kellogg's	1952	Kellogg's	Eight "integrated commercials" starring George Reeves.
Batgirl Equal Pay Public Service Announcement	1974	Public Service Announcement	Put out by the U.S. Department of Labor.
Batman Diet Coke	1989	Diet Coke	
Catwoman Diet Coke	1992	Diet Coke	
Hawkman Baby Ruth	1997	Baby Ruth	A tongue-in-cheek commercial.
Batman OnStar commercials	2001	OnStar	A series of six television commercials.
The Adventures of Seinfeld & Superman	2004	American Express	Two short film commercials promoting American Express.
El Palacio de Hierro	2006	El Palacio de Hierro	A Mexican commercial starring Wonder Woman, Catwoman, and Batgirl.
Vai que... Batman	2014	Bradesco Seguros	A Brazilian commercial starring Batman and The Joker.
Honey Bunches of Oats	2016	Honey Bunches of Oats	Features archival footage of Wonder Woman in Super Friends.

== Animated ==
Title	Seasons	Episodes	Original airing	Production company(s)	Network	Notes	Ref.
The New Adventures of Superman	4	68	1966–1970	Filmation / National Periodical Publications	CBS	Part of The New Adventures of Superman franchise.	
The Adventures of Superboy	3	34	1966–1969	Filmation / National Periodical Publications	CBS	Part of The New Adventures of Superman franchise.	
The Superman/Aquaman Hour of Adventure	1	36	1967–1968	Filmation / National Periodical Publications	CBS	Part of The New Adventures of Superman franchise.	
Aquaman	1	36	1968–1970	Filmation / National Periodical Publications	CBS	Part of The New Adventures of Superman franchise.	
The Batman/Superman Hour	1	34	1968–1969	Filmation / National Periodical Publications	CBS	Part of The New Adventures of Superman franchise.	
The Adventures of Batman	1	17	1968–1969	Filmation / National Periodical Publications	CBS	Part of The New Adventures of Superman franchise.	
Super Friends	1	16	1973	Hanna-Barbera Productions / National Periodical Publications	ABC	Part of the Super Friends franchise.	
The New Adventures of Batman	1	16	1977–1978	Filmation / DC Comics	CBS	Part of The New Adventures of Batman franchise.	
The All-New Super Friends Hour	1	15	1977–1978	Hanna-Barbera Productions / DC Comics	ABC	Part of the Super Friends franchise.	
The Batman/Tarzan Adventure Hour	1	7	1977–1978	Filmation / DC Comics	CBS	Part of The New Adventures of Batman franchise.	
Challenge of the Superfriends	2	16	1978	Hanna-Barbera Productions / DC Comics	ABC	Part of the Super Friends franchise.	
The Plastic Man Comedy/Adventure Show	5	112	1979–1981	Ruby-Spears Productions / DC Comics	ABC		
The World's Greatest Super Friends	1	8	1979–1980	Hanna-Barbera / DC Comics	ABC	Part of the Super Friends franchise.	
Super Friends	3	22	1980–1983	Hanna-Barbera / DC Comics	ABC	Part of the Super Friends franchise.	
Batman and the Super 7	1	—N/a	1980–1981	Filmation / DC Comics	CBS	Part of The New Adventures of Batman franchise.	
The Kid Super Power Hour with Shazam!	2	38	1981–1982	Filmation / DC Comics	NBC		
Super Friends: The Legendary Super Powers Show	1	8	1984–1985	Hanna-Barbera / DC Comics	ABC	Part of the Super Friends franchise.	
The Super Powers Team: Galactic Guardians	1	8	1985	Hanna-Barbera / DC Comics	ABC	Part of the Super Friends franchise.	
Superman	1	13	1988	Ruby-Spears / DC Comics	CBS		
Swamp Thing	1	5	1990–1991	DIC Entertainment / DC Comics / Batfilm Productions, Inc.	Fox (Fox Kids)		
Batman: The Animated Series	2	85	1992–1995	Warner Bros. Animation / Warner Bros. Family Entertainment (1993–1995)	Fox (Fox Kids)	Part of the DC Animated Universe.	
The Superman/Batman Adventures	1	—N/a	1995–1997	Filmation / Hanna-Barbera / DC Comics	USA Network	Part of The New Adventures of Superman and Super Friends franchises.	
Superman: The Animated Series	4	54	1996–2000	Warner Bros. Television Animation / Warner Bros. Family Entertainment	The WB (Kids' WB)	Part of the DC Animated Universe.	
The New Batman Adventures	1	24	1997–1999	Warner Bros. Television Animation / Warner Bros. Family Entertainment	The WB (Kids' WB)	Sequel to Batman: The Animated Series. Part of the DC Animated Universe.	
The New Batman/Superman Adventures	1	3	1997–2000	Warner Bros. Television Animation / Warner Bros. Family Entertainment	The WB (Kids' WB)	Part of the DC Animated Universe.	
Batman Beyond	3	52	1999–2001	Warner Bros. Television Animation / Warner Bros. Family Entertainment	The WB (Kids' WB)	Part of the DC Animated Universe.	
The Zeta Project	2	26	2001–2002	Warner Bros. Television Animation / Warner Bros. Family Entertainment	The WB (Kids' WB)	Spin-off of Batman Beyond. Part of the DC Animated Universe.	
Justice League	2	52	2001–2004	Warner Bros. Animation / Warner Bros. Family Entertainment	Cartoon Network	Part of the DC Animated Universe.	
Teen Titans	5	65	2003–2006	Warner Bros. Animation / Warner Bros. Family Entertainment / DC Comics (season 5)	Cartoon Network		
Justice League Unlimited	3	39	2004–2006	Warner Bros. Animation / Warner Bros. Family Entertainment / DC Comics (season 3)	Cartoon Network	Sequel to Justice League. Part of the DC Animated Universe.	
The Batman	5	65	2004–2008	Warner Bros. Animation / Warner Bros. Family Entertainment / DC Comics (seasons 3–5)	The WB (seasons 1–3) / The CW (seasons 4–5) (Kids' WB) / Cartoon Network (2004–2006)		
Krypto the Superdog	2	39	2005–2006	Warner Bros. Animation / Warner Bros. Family Entertainment / DC Comics (season 2)	Cartoon Network		
Legion of Super Heroes	2	26	2006–2008	Warner Bros. Animation / Warner Bros. Family Entertainment / DC Comics	The CW (Kids' WB)		
Batman: The Brave and the Bold	3	65	2008–2011	Warner Bros. Animation / DC Comics (season 1) / DC Entertainment (seasons 2–3)	Cartoon Network		
Young Justice	4	98	2010–2022	Warner Bros. Animation / DC Entertainment	Cartoon Network (seasons 1–2) / DC Universe (season 3) / HBO Max (season 4)		
Green Lantern: The Animated Series	1	26	2011–2013	Warner Bros. Animation / DC Entertainment	Cartoon Network	Young Justice adjacent.	
Beware the Batman	1	26	2013–2014	Warner Bros. Animation / DC Entertainment	Cartoon Network (2013) / Adult Swim (2014)		
Justice League Action	1	52	2016–2018	Warner Bros. Animation / DC Entertainment	Cartoon Network		
DC Super Hero Girls	2	78	2019–2021	Warner Bros. Animation / DC Entertainment	Cartoon Network	Reboot of the 2015 web series of the same name.	
Harley Quinn	5	57	2019–2025	Warner Bros. Animation / DC Entertainment / Yes, Norman Productions / Ehsugadee Productions (seasons 1–2) / Delicious Non-Sequitur (seasons 3–5) / Lorey Stories (season 5)	DC Universe (seasons 1–2) / HBO Max (season 3) / Max (seasons 4–5)		
Aquaman: King of Atlantis	1	3	2021	Warner Bros. Animation / DC Entertainment / Atomic Monster	HBO Max / Cartoon Network	Miniseries. Stand-alone sequel to Aquaman.	
Suicide Squad Isekai	1	10	2024	Warner Bros. Japan / Wit Studio	Max (U.S.) / Hulu (U.S.) / Tokyo MX (Japan) / BS11 (Japan)	Anime.	
Kite Man: Hell Yeah!	1	10	2024	Warner Bros. Animation / DC Entertainment / Delicious Non-Sequitur / Lorey Stories / Yes, Norman Productions	Max	Spin-off of Harley Quinn.	
Ongoing
Teen Titans Go!	9	456	2013–present	Warner Bros. Animation / DC Entertainment	Cartoon Network	Stand-alone spin-off of Teen Titans. Season 9 ongoing Renewed for a tenth season	
Batwheels	3	98	2022–present	Warner Bros. Animation / DC Entertainment	Cartoon Network (Cartoonito)	Season 3 ongoing	
My Adventures with Superman	3	30	2023–present	Warner Bros. Animation / DC Entertainment	Adult Swim		
Batman: Caped Crusader	2	20	2024–present	Warner Bros. Animation / DC Entertainment / Amazon MGM Studios / 6th & Idaho Motion Picture Company / Bad Robot	Amazon Prime Video		
Creature Commandos	1	7	2024–present	Warner Bros. Animation / DC Studios / Lorey Stories / The Safran Company / Troll Court Entertainment	Max	Part of the DC Universe. Renewed for a second season	
Bat-Fam	1	10	2025–present	Warner Bros. Animation / DC Entertainment / Amazon MGM Studios	Amazon Prime Video	Sequel to Merry Little Batman.	
Upcoming
My Adventures with Green Lantern	TBA	TBA	TBA	Warner Bros. Animation / DC Studios	TBA	Spin-off of My Adventures with Superman.	
DC Super Powers	TBA	TBA	TBA	Warner Bros. Animation / DC Studios	TBA		
Starfire!	TBA	TBA	TBA	Warner Bros. Animation / DC Studios	TBA		
Mister Miracle	TBA	TBA	TBA	Warner Bros. Animation / DC Studios	TBA	Part of the DC Universe.	
Absolute Batman	TBA	TBA	TBA	Warner Bros. Animation / DC Studios	TBA		
Krypto	TBA	TBA	TBA	Warner Bros. Animation / DC Studios	TBA		
Joker: Laugh Riot	TBA	TBA	TBA	Warner Bros. Animation / DC Studios	TBA	Anime.	

=== From DC imprints ===
Title	Seasons	Episodes	Original running	Production company(s)	Network	Notes	Ref.
Wild C.A.T.s	1	13	1994–1995	Nelvana / WildStorm	CBS	Published at the time by Image Comics.	
Static Shock	4	52	2000–2004	Warner Bros. Animation / Warner Bros. Family Entertainment	The WB (Kids' WB)	Part of the DC Animated Universe.	
MAD	4	103	2010–2013	Warner Bros. Animation	Cartoon Network	Various sketches featured several DC Comics characters.	
Get Jiro	1	10	2026–present	Warner Bros. Animation / DC Studios	Adult Swim		

=== Pilots ===
Title	Year	Production company(s)	Network	Notes
The Mad Magazine TV Special	1974	Focus Entertainment Inc	ABC	Unaired.
Mad Magazine Special	1988	Hanna-Barbera Productions	CBS	Unaired.
Plastic Man	2006	Warner Bros. Animation / DC Comics	Cartoon Network	Unaired.

=== TV animated specials ===
Title	Year	Production company	Network	Notes	Ref.
Robot Chicken DC Comics Special	2012	Warner Bros. Animation / DC Entertainment / Williams Street / Sony Pictures Television / Stoopid Buddy Stoodios	Adult Swim		
Robot Chicken DC Comics Special 2: Villains in Paradise	2014	Warner Bros. Animation / DC Entertainment / Williams Street / Sony Pictures Television / Stoopid Buddy Stoodios	Adult Swim		
Robot Chicken DC Comics Special III: Magical Friendship	2015	Warner Bros. Animation / DC Entertainment / Williams Street / Sony Pictures Television / Stoopid Buddy Stoodios	Adult Swim		
Teen Titans Go! See Space Jam	2021	Warner Bros. Animation / DC Entertainment	Cartoon Network		
Beebo Saves Christmas	2021	Warner Bros. Animation / DC Entertainment / Berlanti Productions	The CW		
Harley Quinn: A Very Problematic Valentine's Day Special	2023	Warner Bros. Animation / DC Entertainment / Yes, Norman Productions / Delicious Non-Sequitur	HBO Max		

=== Motion comics ===
Title	Original running	Episodes	Production company(s)	Network	Notes	Ref.
Video Comics	1979–1981		Morganix Pictures / DC Comics	Nickelodeon; Columbus Alive!		
Watchmen: Motion Comic	2008	12	Warner Premiere Digital / DC Comics / Cruel and Unusual Films / Lawrence Gordon/Lloyd Levin Productions	iTunes		
Batman Black and White	2008	20	Warner Premiere Digital / DC Comics	iTunes	2 seasons.	
Batgirl: Year One	2009	9	Warner Premiere Digital / DC Comics	iTunes		
The Batman Adventures: Mad Love	2009	3	Warner Premiere Digital / DC Comics	iTunes		
Superman: Red Son	2009	12	Warner Premiere Digital / DC Comics	iTunes		
Jonah Hex	2010	7	Warner Premiere Digital / DC Comics	iTunes		

=== Web and short series ===
Title	Seasons	Episodes	Original running	Production company(s)	Network	Notes	Ref.
Lobo	1	14	2000	Warner Bros. Animation / NoodleSoup Productions	Lobo Online website	Part of the DC Animated Universe.	
Gotham Girls	3	30	2000–2002	Warner Bros. Animation / NoodleSoup Productions	Warner Bros. website	Part of the DC Animated Universe.	
Zatanna: Trial of the Crystal Wand	1	2	2003	Warner Bros. Animation / NoodleSoup Productions	Cartoon Monsoon website		
The Aquaman & Friends Action Hour	1	7	2003	Wild Hare Studios	CN Latin America	Spoof continuation of Super Friends.	
DC Nation Shorts	—N/a	162	2011–2014	Warner Bros. Animation / DC Entertainment	Cartoon Network	Animated shorts aired as interstitials on the DC Nation television block on Cartoon Network.	
Batman Unlimited	2	33	2015–2016	Warner Bros. Animation / DC Entertainment	YouTube (DC Kids Channel)		
DC Super Friends	1	15	2015	Warner Bros. Animation / DC Entertainment / Imaginext / Titmouse, Inc.	YouTube (DC Kids Channel)		
Justice League: Gods and Monsters Chronicles	1	3	2015	Warner Bros. Animation / DC Entertainment / Blue Ribbon Content	YouTube (Machinima channel)	Related to the film. Renewed for season 2, but subsequently shelved indefinitely.	
Vixen	2	12	2015–2016	Warner Bros. Animation / DC Entertainment / Blue Ribbon Content	CW Seed	Part of the Arrowverse.	
DC Super Hero Girls	5	112	2015–2018	Warner Bros. Animation / DC Entertainment	YouTube (DC Super Hero Girls channel)		
Justice League Action Shorts	1	22	2017	Warner Bros. Animation / DC Entertainment	YouTube (DC Kids Channel)		
Freedom Fighters: The Ray	2	12	2017–2018	Warner Bros. Animation / DC Entertainment / Blue Ribbon Content	CW Seed	Part of the Arrowverse.	
Constantine: City of Demons	1	2	2018–2019	Warner Bros. Animation / DC Entertainment / Blue Ribbon Content / Berlanti Productions / Phantom Four Productions	CW Seed	Part of the DC Animated Movie Universe.	
DC Super Hero Girls: Super Shorts	1	52	2019–2020	Warner Bros. Animation / DC Entertainment	YouTube (DC Super Hero Girls channel)		
Deathstroke: Knights & Dragons	1	2	2020	Warner Bros. Animation / DC Entertainment / Blue Ribbon Content / Berlanti Productions	CW Seed		
Beast Boy: Lone Wolf	1	10	2024	Hanna-Barbera Studios Europe / DC Studios	Cartoon Network (United Kingdom)		
Krypto Saves the Day!	1	4	2025–2026	Warner Bros. Animation / DC Studios	YouTube		

== See also ==
- List of television series based on Marvel Comics publications
- List of films based on DC Comics publications
- List of video games based on DC Comics
- List of unproduced DC Comics projects
- DC Animated Universe
- DC Animated Movie Universe
- Arrowverse
- DC Extended Universe
- DC Universe
