= The Adventures of Superboy =

- Created by: Whitney Ellsworth
- Based on: Superboy by: Jerry Siegel; Joe Shuster; Don Cameron
- Starring: Johnny Rockwell; Bunny Henning
- Country of origin: United States
- No. of episodes: 1

Production
- Running time: 25 minutes

The Adventures of Superboy is a proposed TV series that was put into production in 1961. It was meant to capitalize on the success of Adventures of Superman, which went out of production in 1958. Only a pilot episode ("Rajah's Ransom") was produced, although 12 additional scripts had been prepared, had the series been picked up.

It featured the first portrayals of Superboy and Lana Lang outside of comic books, and stands as a forerunner of later series based on Clark Kent's youth: Superboy, which lasted four seasons, and Smallville, which lasted ten seasons.

== Cast ==
- Johnny Rockwell as Kal-El/Clark Kent/Superboy
- Bunny Henning as Lana Lang
- Monty Margetts as Martha Kent

=== Guest cast ===
- Ross Elliot as Fred Drake
- Charles Maxwell as Gunner Ferde
- Robert Williams as Chief Parker
- Richard Reeves as Shorty Barnes
- Yvonne White as Miss Gibbs
- Stacy Harris as Jake Ferde
- Jimmy Bates as Jimmie Drake
- Ray Walker as Mr. Edlund
- True Ellison as Donna

== Home media ==
The only stand-alone releases so far for The Adventures of Superboy have been from specialty distributors, such as Video Rarities, which released it on VHS along with The Adventures of Superpup and screen test footage as Superboy and Superpup: The Lost Pilots.

This pilot episode has been included in the 62-disc DVD box set of Smallville: The Complete Series, released by Warner Home Video in November 2011, along with additional bonus features not included in the individual season releases of Smallville.

== Other media ==
A book titled Superboy and Superpup: The Lost Videos, written by Chuck Harter, was published in 1993 by Cult Movies Press. It looked at both The Adventures of Superboy pilot and The Adventures of Superpup pilot, as well as the 12 additional Superboy scripts that were prepared had the Superboy pilot been picked up as a series. The book also claims that a story in issue #88 of the Superboy comic is based on the pilot script. In September 2022, BearmanorMedia.com republished "Superboy & Superpup The Lost Videos" by Chuck Harter, now with a full color cover. The new edition is available in hardback, paperback, and e-book editions.
