= Western Comics =

- Western Comics #1 (Jan./Feb. 1948), artwork by Howard Sherman.

Publication information
- Publisher: DC Comics
- Schedule: Bi-monthly
- Format: Anthology
- Publication date: Jan./Feb. 1948 – Jan./Feb. 1961
- No. of issues: 85
- Main character(s): Pow Wow Smith; Wyoming Kid; Nighthawk; Cowboy Marshal; Rodeo Rick; Matt Savage, Trail Boss; Vigilante

Creative team
- Written by: Don Cameron, Gardner Fox, France Herron
- Artist(s): Carmine Infantino, Gil Kane, Howard Sherman, Leonard Starr
- Editor(s): Whitney Ellsworth, Julius Schwartz

Western Comics is a Western comic book series that was published by DC Comics. DC's longest-running Western title, it published 85 issues from 1948 to 1961. Western Comics was an anthology series, featuring such characters as the wandering cowboy the Wyoming Kid, the Native American lawman Pow Wow Smith, the Cowboy Marshal, Jim Sawyer, showman Rodeo Rick, and Matt Savage, Trail Boss. The masked Vigilante Greg Saunders appeared in the first four issues of the title, but was soon replaced by itinerant fix-it man Nighthawk.

Notable contributors included writers Don Cameron, Gardner Fox, and France Herron; and artists Carmine Infantino, Gil Kane, Howard Sherman, and Leonard Starr.

== Publication history ==
Whitney Ellsworth edited the book for most of its run, assisted by Julius Schwartz, who took over the editorial reins for the last two years. Originally featuring four or more stories per issue, by issue #70 (July/Aug. 1958), Western Comics reduced the number of stories to three. Western Comics' infrequently appearing letter column was titled "The Hitching Post".

== Recurring features ==
- Wyoming Kid: co-created by Jack Schiff and Howard Sherman, Bill Polk is a cowboy wandering the West looking for his father's murderer. Bill, with his horse Racer, improves his gunfighting skills while working as a ranch hand, rodeo rider, army scout, and so on, finally bringing the murderer to justice. A good-natured hero, the Wyoming Kid appeared in every issue of Western Comics, often featured on the cover in early issues. He was so popular in Western Comics that his adventures were also chronicled in World's Finest Comics from 1949 – 1953.
- Pow Wow Smith: moving over from Detective Comics, the character first appeared in Western Comics issue #43 (Jan./Feb. 1954), at that point becoming a principal figure, often appearing on the cover. He appeared in every issue from #43 to the end of the title's run.
- Nighthawk: masked cowboy Hannibal Hawkes appeared in every issue of Western Comics from #5 (Sept./Oct. 1948) – #76 (July/Aug. 1959)
- Rodeo Rick — co-created by artist Howard Post, Rick and his horse Comet's adventures were later chronicled by writers Gardner Fox and France Herron, and artists Jimmy Thompson, Ramona Fradon, and Tom Cooke. Rick was featured in most issues of Western Comics from #1 – #69 (May/Jun 1958). For a short time in later issues, he wore a disguise and was known as "The Masked Raider".
- Cowboy Marshal, Jim Sawyer — the Cowboy Marshal was featured in every issue of the title from #1 – #42 (Nov./Dec. 1953).
- Matt Savage, Trail Boss — created by Gardner Fox, Gil Kane, and Joe Giella, the character was a late addition to Western Comics (taking Nighthawk's slot) in issue #77 (Sept./Oct. 1959), but was the title's cover feature until the end. It was later established that Matt was Scalphunter's father, and was also related to Lt. Steve Savage, the World War I pilot briefly featured in All-American Men of War.
