= Cherie Wilkerson =

American writer

Cherie Dee Wilkerson is an American writer best known for her work on animated television series such as Batman: The Animated Series, DuckTales, The Transformers and the 1988 version of Superman, amongst others. Her TV writing career lasted from 1984 through 1992.

She also has published several short stories in the genres of horror and fantasy, beginning with an appearance in the 1981 anthology Shadows 4, edited by Charles L. Grant. She served as a co-editor for the 1995 non-fiction book The Big Elfquest Gatherum. Since 1996, she has worked as a freelance copy editor.

== Writing credits ==
=== Television ===
- My Little Pony (1986)
- Dinosaucers (1987)
- DuckTales (1987)
- Jem (1987)
- Spiral Zone (1987)
- Sylvanian Families (1987)
- The Transformers (1987)
- Superman (1988)
- Batman: The Animated Series (1992)
