= Janu the Jungle Boy =

Publication information
- Publisher: DC Comics
- First appearance: Action Comics #191 (April 1954)
- Created by: Jack Miller (writer); Ed Smalle (artist)

In-story information
- Species: Human
- Team affiliations: Congo Bill
- Notable aliases: Congorilla
- Abilities: Survival, tracking, swimming

Janu the Jungle Boy is a fictional character published by DC Comics. He is a young boy brought up in the jungle after his father has been killed by a tiger, and who appears as a sidekick to Congo Bill, who adopts him as his ward. Janu first appears in Action Comics #191 (April 1954), in a story written by Jack Miller and drawn by Ed Smalle.

Once Congo Bill became Congorilla, Janu's main job was to keep Congo Bill's human body protected while Bill's brain was transferred into that of the Golden Gorilla.

After a time, Janu left Congo Bill for formal education in America. When he later returned to Africa, he convinced Congo Bill that Africa's destiny was industrialization. The two became business partners and built a successful conglomerate. Bill eventually came to see this life as a betrayal of his former life and he rejected Janu's new philosophy, packed in the corporate life, and returned to adventuring as Congorilla.

In the 1994, Congorilla mini-series Janu has now grown up and betrays Congo Bill, usurping the Congorilla identity, and forces Congo Bill to fight him to death.

== See also ==
- Tarzan
