= Alfred Pennyworth =

Fictional character throughout the DC Universe

- Alfred Pennyworth as seen on the cover art of Batman #686 (March 2009). Art by Alex Ross.

Publication information
- Publisher: DC Comics
- First appearance: Batman (16 July 1943); DC Comics: Batman #16 (April–May 1943)
- Created by: As Alfred: Victor McLeod (writer); Leslie Swabacker (writer); Harry Fraser (writer); As Alfred Beagle: Don Cameron (writer); Bob Kane (artist); As Alfred Pennyworth: Bill Finger (writer); Jerry Robinson (artist)

In-story information
- Full name: Alfred Thaddeus Crane Pennyworth
- Species: Human
- Team affiliations: Batman Family; Wayne Family
- Supporting character of: Batman
- Notable aliases: Alfred Beagle, Alfred J(arvis), Pennyworth, Thaddeus Crane, Thaddeus Middleton, The Eagle, Penny-One, The Outsider
- Abilities: Classically trained butler; Classically trained actor; Former British special forces and intelligence expert; Proficiency in first aid medical techniques and computer systems; Skilled in armed and unarmed combat

Alfred Thaddeus Crane Pennyworth, originally Alfred Beagle, is a fictional character appearing in American comic books published by DC Comics, most commonly in association with the superhero Batman.

Alfred is depicted as Batman's meticulous, disciplined, loyal and tireless confidant, butler, legal guardian, best friend, aide-de-camp, and surrogate father figure following the murders of his parents, Thomas and Martha Wayne. As a British noble who is a classically trained butler, whose skills extend beyond housekeeping, Alfred is uniquely suited to support the lives of masked crime fighters. A former British intelligence officer, field medic and retired Shakespearean actor operative of honor and ethics with connections within the intelligence community, he has been called "Batman's batman". He serves as Bruce's moral anchor while providing comic relief with his sardonic and cynical attitude; as an amnesiac, he has also served as the supervillainous Outsider. A vital part of the Batman mythos, Alfred was nominated for the Wizard Fan Award for Favorite Supporting Male Character in 1994. Bane killed Alfred in 2019 during the City of Bane storyline, and he remains dead in the primary continuity of the DC Universe as of 2026.

In non-comics media, the character has been portrayed in live-action and voiced by actors William Austin, Eric Wilton, Michael Gough, Michael Caine, Jeremy Irons, Douglas Hodge, and Andy Serkis on film, and by Alan Napier, Efrem Zimbalist Jr., Ian Abercrombie, David McCallum, and Sean Pertwee on television, among others. Ralph Fiennes provided the voice of Alfred in the animated Lego Movie franchise, and Martin Jarvis voiced the character in the Batman: Arkham video game series. A young version of Pertwee's Alfred, played by Jack Bannon, is depicted before he became the butler to the Wayne family in the television series Pennyworth.

== Publication history ==
The character first appeared in Batman #16 (April–May 1943), by writer Don Cameron and artist Bob Kane. Evidence suggests that Alfred was created by the writers of the 1943 Batman serial film—Victor McLeod, Leslie Swabacker, and Harry Fraser—and that DC Comics asked Don Cameron to write the first Alfred story, which was published prior to the serial's release.

== Fictional character biography ==
In Alfred's first appearance, he was overweight and clean-shaven; however, when the 1943 Batman serial was released, William Austin, the actor who played Alfred, was trim and sported a thin mustache.

DC editors wanted the comic Alfred to resemble his cinematic counterpart, so in Detective Comics #83 (January 1944), Alfred vacationed at a health resort, where he slimmed down and grew a mustache.

This look has remained with the character ever since, even surviving his apparent "death" (Note: Bill Finger (w), Sheldon Moldoff (p), Joe Giella (i). "Gotham Gang Line-Up!" Detective Comics, no. 328 (June 1964). DC Comics.) and resurrection. (Note: Gardner Fox (w), Sheldon Moldoff (p), Joe Giella (i). "Inside Story of the Outsider!" Detective Comics, no. 328 (October 1964).Detective Comics #356 in 1966)

Alfred (later named Pennyworth) in his first appearance ever, as an overweight, bumbling detective

Alfred was originally conceived as a comedic foil for Batman and Robin; he spoke with a Cockney accent, and simply arrived on Wayne Manor's doorstep to announce that he was beginning his duties.

In most early tales, he made bungling attempts to be a detective on a par with the young masters. He was given a four-page feature of his own, "The Adventures of Alfred", in Batman #22 (April–May 1944) (Note: Mort Weisinger (w), Jerry Robinson (a). "Conversational Clue" Batman, no. 22 (April–May 1944). DC Comics.) and the feature lasted 13 issues, skipping Batman #35, with the last story in Batman #36. (Note: Jerry Robinson (a)"Elusive London Eddie" Batman, no. 36 (August–September 1946).)

The stories followed a simple formula, with Alfred solving a crime and catching the culprits entirely by accident. In later years, the comedic aspects of the character were downplayed.

=== Pre-Crisis ===
The Pre-Crisis comics (the comics that were published by DC Comics between 1935 and 1984) established Alfred as a retired actor and intelligence agent who followed the deathbed wish of his dying father (identified only as "Jarvis") to carry on the tradition of serving the Wayne family.

To that end, Alfred introduced himself to Bruce Wayne and Dick Grayson at Wayne Manor and insisted on becoming their butler. Although the pair did not want one, especially since they did not want to jeopardize their secret identities with a servant in the house, they did not have the heart to reject Alfred.

Initially, Alfred discovered their identities by accident; while fighting a burglar in Batman #16 (Alfred's first appearance), he accidentally hit a switch and opened a sliding panel leading to the Batcave. He is helpful to the duo, following them to a theater where they had been captured, bound, and gagged by a criminal gang, and rescues them after Batman attracts his attention by knocking a rope down before the crooks return.

This was revised in Batman #110 (September 1957); during his first night at Wayne Manor, Alfred awoke to moaning and followed the sound to the secret passage to the staircase leading to the Batcave and met his would-be employers in their superhero identities with Batman wounded in the field. As it turned out, the wounds were actually insignificant, but Alfred's care convinced the residents that their butler could be trusted. Since then, Alfred cheerfully included the support staff duties of the Dynamic Duo on top of his regular tasks.

Ironically, Alfred's loyalty would lead him to become a member of Batman's rogue's gallery: While pushing Batman and Robin out of the way of a falling boulder, Alfred was seemingly killed in Detective Comics #328 (June 1964). It was revealed in Detective Comics #356 (October 1966) that he had been revived by a scientist named Brandon Crawford. His attempt at regeneration gave Alfred pale white skin, superhuman powers, including telekinesis, and a desire to destroy Batman and Robin. Calling himself the Outsider, he indirectly battled Batman and Robin on a number of occasions, using others as his puppets. He did not physically appear in the comics until Detective #356, when he is bathed again in the rays of the regeneration machine during a struggle with Batman, and returns to normal, with no memory of his time as a supervillain.

Alfred was later reunited with his long-lost daughter, Julia Remarque, though this element was not included in Post-Crisis comics. Her mother was the war heroine Mademoiselle Marie, whom Alfred had met while working as an intelligence agent in occupied France during World War II.

=== Post-Crisis and Zero Hour ===
In the Post-Crisis comics continuity, Alfred has been the Wayne family butler all of Bruce's life and had helped his master establish his superhero career from the beginning.

In addition, he was Bruce's legal guardian and father figure following the murder of the boy's parents. Alfred's history has been modified several times over the years, creating assorted versions. In one such version, Alfred was hired away from the British royal family by Bruce's parents, and he virtually raised Bruce after they were murdered.

Another version of Alfred's Post-Crisis life was slightly more closely linked to his Pre-Crisis counterpart. In this version, Alfred is an up-and-coming actor on the English stage who agrees to become the Waynes' butler to honor his father's dying wish that he continue the "family business" of serving the Waynes; his father having been butler for Bruce's grandparents.

At the time he begins working for the Waynes, Bruce is a young child. After only a few months, Alfred informs the Waynes that he will resign his post, feeling that the role of a butler is beneath him. That same day, Bruce returns home after getting in a fight with a school bully. Alfred advises him to outsmart the bully rather than use physical force. The advice works, and when Bruce asks his parents if Alfred can stay, he agrees without a second thought. When Bruce is left orphaned by the murder of his parents, Alfred steps in as his legal guardian.

Alfred later helps Bruce raise his adopted wards Dick Grayson, Jason Todd, and Tim Drake, all of whom also become his crimefighting partner, Robin. He also has close friendships with other members of the Batman family, including Barbara Gordon and Cassandra Cain. Alfred often acts as a father figure to Bruce, and a grandfather to Dick, Jason, and Tim. He is also highly respected by Batman's fellow superheroes, including Superman, Wonder Woman, Green Lantern, and the original Teen Titans.

Alfred has also been romantically linked to Dr. Leslie Thompkins, a Wayne family friend who is also aware of Bruce's secret identity. He ends the relationship after she apparently allows Stephanie Brown to die from neglect. He also develops feelings for Tim Drake's stepmother, but again, nothing comes of it.

In the Knightfall story arc, Alfred watches helplessly as Batman slowly crumbles under the pressure of fighting every escaped criminal in Arkham Asylum, who were set free by Bane. When Bane breaks Batman's back, Alfred tries to treat the injury, but Batman remains paraplegic and a wheelchair user.

During the events of Knightquest, Alfred accompanies Bruce to England and becomes enraged when he insists on endangering his own health. This is the culmination of several weeks of Bruce's self-destructive behavior, and when Bruce returns to Gotham City, Alfred remains in England, after tendering his resignation. He spends some time vacationing in Antarctica and the Bahamas before returning to England, aware that Bruce would respect his choice and not actively try to look for him. Dick Grayson tracks him down several months later and convinces him to return to Wayne Manor after the two thwart a terrorist attack on the Channel Tunnel. In that story, it is revealed Alfred had walked out of his own wedding years earlier after his fiancé, Joanna Clark, was revealed to have been cheating on him for months beforehand. During a reunion with Joanna, she claims that her son Derek is actually Alfred's son rather than the son of her now-deceased lover and former husband, but after Derek is killed by terrorists Joanna admits that this was a lie to get Alfred's help. The matter resolved, Alfred decides to return to Gotham; having lived separate from the world for years in Wayne Manor, his time on holiday leads him to conclude that ordinary people let their emotions run deep but their understanding of themselves is shallow, choosing to return to Gotham now that Bruce has acknowledged his limits and resolved to control his destiny.

Alfred's resourcefulness comes to the fore in the No Man's Land storyline, especially in Legends of the Dark Knight #118. Batman goes missing for weeks, leaving Alfred alone to watch his city for him. He uses his skills as an actor, storyteller, medic, and spy to survive and collect information on the recently destroyed Gotham City. Alfred even uses hand-to-hand combat in a rare one-panel fight sequence between him and a pair of slavers that ends with his rescue by Batman.

In Batman #677, agents of Batman's mysterious enemy Black Glove attack and beat Alfred in front of Bruce and Jezebel Jet, severely injuring him. In the same issue, a reporter from The Gotham Gazette suggests to Commissioner Jim Gordon that Alfred may be Bruce's biological father and that this may be a reason for the murder of Bruce's mother Martha. Alfred later denies the entire story, agreeing with Bruce that it was a fabrication, explicitly noting that the man intended to be him in the doctored photographs looks nothing like Alfred at the implied age.

After the event of Final Crisis, when Batman is apparently killed in action, Alfred finds himself with the task of raising Bruce's biological son Damian with Grayson. Batman: Battle for the Cowl sees Alfred allowing Damian to take on his first mission as Robin, giving Damian a Robin tunic and calling on the Squire to assist the new Boy Wonder in finding Tim Drake, who had gone missing while hunting down Jason Todd. Alfred also assists Grayson in his role as Gotham's new Dark Knight.

Alfred is left emotionally shattered by Bruce's death, commenting more than once that, even if his biological fatherhood is a fabrication, in a deeper sense he actually was Bruce Wayne's father, having watched over him for years and feeling he failed him in the last moments.

In the Batman and the Outsiders Special, Alfred is seen apologizing at the graves of Thomas and Martha Wayne for Bruce's death, commenting that he grieves as a parent, regarding Bruce as his son. Later, a secret panel in Alfred's room opens, the result of a fail-safe planted by Bruce in the event of his death. Bruce leaves him one final task and also bids him an emotional goodbye, telling Alfred he considered him a father.

After discovering that the original Batman was actually lost in time after his battle with Darkseid, Alfred immediately seeks clues to his whereabouts. Eventually, Bruce finds his way to the present. After Batman successfully expands his mission globally with Batman Inc., Bruce assumes full responsibility as a father, and Alfred assists him in raising Damian.

=== The New 52 ===
In The New 52, it is revealed that Alfred's father Jarvis Pennyworth was the butler of the Wayne family before Alfred, when Bruce was a child. Jarvis was blackmailed by the Court of Owls to set a trap for the pregnant Martha Wayne. He declined and the Court managed to cause a car accident that caused the child to be born prematurely and eventually to have died.

Jarvis attempted to resign from his service and write a letter to his son in which he describes the manor as a cursed place, and tells Alfred that he should not begin his service under the Wayne family. However, Jarvis was unable to send the letter as he was murdered that night. (Note: Scott Snyder, James Tynion IV (w), Rafael Albuquerque (a), Dave McCaig (col). "Fall of the House of Wayne" Batman, vol. 2, no. 9-11 (July–September 2012). DC Comics.)

During Batman: Eternal, Alfred is reunited with his long-absent daughter, Julia Pennyworth, an agent of the Special Reconnaissance Regiment, when Batman finds her in Hong Kong and takes her back to Wayne Manor for medical treatment. She is initially hostile to Alfred, feeling that he has wasted his life going from a soldier to tending to a "fop" like Bruce Wayne. However, after Alfred is attacked by Hush and infected with a fear toxin, she discovers the Batcave and takes on her father's role to coordinate the Bat-Family's efforts against their foes.

Alfred is briefly transferred to Arkham Asylum before it is attacked as part of a conspiracy, but he manages to survive the explosion and tricks Bane into helping him reach an emergency cave Batman had installed under Arkham. The cave's defences knocking Bane out and allowing Alfred to call for help.

When Hush is briefly kept prisoner in the Batcave, he manages to break out of his cell and lock Alfred in it before sabotaging the Batman Family's equipment via the Batcomputer as they fought various villains, including crashing the Batwing with Batman still in it. However, he was swiftly returned to captivity when Alfred escapes the cell and knocks Hush out, Alfred harshly informs Tommy that he was hardly going to be locked up in his own home.

During the Batman: Endgame arc, the Joker breaks into the Batcave, and cuts off Alfred's right hand. Following the death of Bruce Wayne, Julia says that with current medical technology, they can have Alfred's hand reattached without any complications. However Alfred refuses, stating that with Bruce dead, he no longer has need of it as he has no one left to serve.

Even with the loss of Bruce as Batman, Alfred still assists the Batman Family in the Batcave, along with Julia. After Bruce is discovered to be alive but with no memory of who he is or of his life as Batman, Alfred tells Bruce everything that had happened in his life up to the point of the creation of Batman, but accepts Bruce's request not to learn any more.

However, when the new villain Mr. Bloom launches a mass attack that apparently kills Jim Gordon—the new Batman—the amnesic Bruce pieces together enough information to deduce that he was once Batman, and convinces Alfred to subject him to a machine that will theoretically download all of his memories as Batman into his mind. With his master restored, Alfred's hand is subsequently reattached.

=== DC Rebirth ===
Following the 2016 DC Rebirth continuity reboot, Alfred appears in Detective Comics and the third volume of Batman, as well as in All-Star Batman. In the latter, Alfred is among the many Gotham citizens blackmailed by Two-Face into stopping Batman from providing Two-Face's former self, Harvey Dent, a cure for his split personality; Alfred in particular reluctantly shoots down the Batwing as Batman is flying it.

Alfred was revealed to have been part of Briar's organization in his earlier life until he left where it was assumed that Briar had died. It would later be revealed that Briar survived and made a clone of Alfred Pennyworth called Dark Knight.

When asked, Alfred reveals his secret; years earlier, he had hired a hitman to kill Joker after the villain murdered Jason Todd and disabled Barbara Gordon. Alfred soon cancelled the hit, however, after realizing that committing cold-blooded murder would betray Batman's ideals.

In Batman #77 (part of the "City of Bane" storyline), the Flashpoint version of Thomas Wayne from an alternate dimension invades Gotham City and defeats Batman, and uses Alfred as a hostage to keep the rest of the Bat-Family out. At Thomas' behest, Bane breaks Alfred's neck, killing him after Robin sneaks into Gotham City to rescue him and defeat Bane.

In Nightwing #78, Barbara visits Dick Grayson and reveals that Alfred was a billionaire, due to stock from Wayne Industries after Alfred became Bruce's legal guardian. Barbara then tells Dick that Alfred has left his fortune to Dick in his will.

Alfred would officially be succeeded as a butler by his grandniece Verity Pennyworth.

== Characterization ==
=== Name ===
In 1945, Alfred's name was given officially as Alfred Beagle. (Note: Don Cameron (w), Dick Sprang (a). "Alfred, Private Detective" Detective Comics, no. 96 (February 1945).) The surname "Beagle" was explicitly used for Alfred starting in 1945 and on the introduction of "Pennyworth" this is treated as having always been their name by retcon.

This name was subsequently given to an alternative version of the character from the world of Earth-Two, and Pennyworth became Alfred's accepted surname in the mainstream continuity. (Note: Frank Robbins (w), Irv Novick (p), Dick Giordano (i). "Angel-- or Devil!" Batman, no. 216 (November 1969).)

The name "Pennyworth" was first used for Alfred in 1969, and thereafter it has been assumed that his father was named Jarvis Pennyworth; as it is customary for British domestic servants to be called by surname it might have been implied on Alfred's introduction that Jarvis was the surname he shared with his father.

Alfred has also used the alias "Thaddeus Crane", which is derived from his middle names. (Note: Edmond Hamilton (w), Dick Sprang (p), Charles Paris (i). "The Man Who Knew Batman's Secret!" Batman, no. 104 (December 1956).)

His full name of Alfred Thaddeus Crane Pennyworth was depicted on his tombstone in Superman/Batman: Generations. Grant Morrison's run has referred to the Beagle surname as a possible stage name. (Note: Grant Morrison (w), Tony Daniel (p), Sandu Florea (i). "Batman R.I.P.: Batman in the Underworld" Batman, no. 677 (July 2008).)

=== Family ===
- Jarvis Pennyworth: Alfred's father in both Pre-Crisis and New 52 continuity. In the TV series, Pennyworth he is named Arthur instead.
- Mary Pennyworth: Alfred's mother in the TV series, Pennyworth.
- Wilfred Pennyworth: Alfred's brother, Wilfred is referenced in the late 1960s and early 1970s (Note: Alan Burnett (w), Dustin Nguyen (p), Derek Fridolfs (i). "Torment" 'Superman/Batman', no. 37-42 (Late August 2007 - Early January 2008). DC Comics.) and is mentioned in the 1997 film Batman & Robin.
- Daphne Blake: Alfred Pennyworth's niece, daughter of Wilfred Pennyworth, Daphne briefly appeared in the late 1960s/early 1970s.
- Mademoiselle Marie: A war heroine with whom Alfred (while working as an intelligence agent in France) has a daughter named Julia in Pre-Crisis continuity. (Note: Detective Comics #501-502)
- Julia Remarque: Alfred's daughter by Mademoiselle Marie. Appears as Julia Pennyworth in The New 52 continuity as well as on Batwoman.
- Margaret Wilson née Pennyworth: Alfred and Wilfred Pennyworth's sister in the 1997 film Batman & Robin.
- Barbara Wilson: Alfred's niece, daughter of Margaret Wilson née Pennyworth in the 1997 film Batman & Robin. In traditional comics, her name is Barbara Gordon and is the daughter of James Gordon, with no relation to Alfred other than her place as Batgirl.
- Theobald: Alfred's second cousin in Earth-One continuity.
- Verity Pennyworth: The grandniece of Alfred and member of Society of the Midnight Key who succeeds him as Bruce Wayne's butler.

=== Skills, resources, and abilities ===
A highly intelligent and resourceful man, Alfred runs the day-to-day operations of Wayne Manor and maintains much of the equipment of the Batcave beneath it.

As a former actor, he can use his acting and disguise skills to help Batman in the field when necessary, and is even capable of impersonating Bruce Wayne's voice.

He has provided first aid up to and including suturing wounds and removing bullets, as well as occasional tactical support. He is also able to perform arthroscopy and other advanced medical procedures, thus limiting, if not eliminating, the need for hospital medical treatment even in the face of grievous injuries, helping to maintain Batman's secret identity by ensuring that Bruce Wayne has no need to visit hospitals for wounds inflicted on Batman. Nevertheless, Batman still requires professional medical treatment when Bane breaks his back (Batman: Knightfall) and Hush's machinations result in him sustaining a skull fracture (Batman: Hush). On these occasions, Alfred admits that his own skills are inadequate for such medical procedures.

While not as skilled at martial arts as Bruce Wayne, Alfred is still nearly as resourceful. In one story in which he is kidnapped, he readily escapes and overcomes his captors without disturbing the cut of his suit. It was later mentioned that he had been kidnapped unsuccessfully 380 times (these events take place in the Gotham Adventures comics, based on the animated adventures of Batman, and not within the standard DCU continuity). (Note: Scott Peterson (w), Craig Rousseau (p), Terry Beatty (i). "Captive Audience" Batman: Gotham Adventures, no. 16 (September 1999). DC Comics.)

Presumably due to his lack of superpowers, the advanced combat training Bruce's other associates have, and Alfred's age, Alfred is the only member of the "Batman Family" that Bruce does not mind using a firearm, in his case favoring a shotgun when dealing with direct attacks on his person.

Alfred has been shown to be a Renaissance man, as he has mastered several fields including rose breeding (even creating his own, the "Pennyworth Blue"), computer programming, electrical engineering, chemical engineering, mechanical engineering, nanotechnology, and biotechnology. He singlehandedly builds, programs, and maintains much of Batman's next-generational technology such as the Batcomputer. (Note: Michael Green (w), Denys Cowan (p), John Floyd (i). "Lovers & Madmen, Part Two: Peace in Arms" Batman Confidential, no. 8 (October 2007). DC Comics.)

== Other versions ==
=== Absolute Universe ===
In Absolute Batman, Alfred Pennyworth, rather than being the Wayne family's butler, is an MI6 agent who is tasked with observing the Party Animals terrorist organization in Gotham City. There, he confronts Batman and later discovers his secret identity as Bruce Wayne. While initially at odds with the vigilante due to his orders, they soon become allies.

=== All Star Batman and Robin the Boy Wonder ===
An alternate universe version of Alfred Pennyworth appears in All Star Batman & Robin, the Boy Wonder. This version is a Royal Air Force combat medic and former member of the British Secret Service.

=== Batman: The Dark Knight Returns ===
An alternate universe version of Alfred Pennyworth appears in Batman: The Dark Knight Returns. At the story's conclusion, having set Wayne Manor to self-destruct to protect Bruce Wayne's full secrets after his faked death during his fight with Superman, Alfred dies of a stroke. In the sequel series Batman: The Dark Knight Strikes Again, the Batcave computer has been programmed with an artificial intelligence named after Alfred.

=== Batman: The Murder Machine ===
In an alternate reality depicted in the Metals crossover, Alfred is killed by Bane, prompting Bruce to request Cyborg's help in completing "the Alfred Protocol", an artificial intelligence version of Alfred, created to allow Batman to keep some aspect of his 'father' with him. Once the Alfred Protocol is completed, its fixation on protecting its 'son' results in the A.I. version of Alfred murdering all of Batman's rogues gallery before merging with Bruce.

=== DCeased ===
An alternate universe version of Alfred Pennyworth appears in DCeased, where he becomes the host of the Spectre following Jim Corrigan's death.

=== Earth One ===
Alfred in Batman: Earth One. Art by Gary Frank.

An alternate universe version of Alfred Pennyworth appears in Batman: Earth One. This version is a former member of the Royal Marines who lost his right leg while saving Thomas Wayne during a battle in the Middle East. Thomas went on to give Alfred a prosthetic leg.

=== Elseworlds ===
Alfred has appeared in different Elseworlds stories:

- Alfred appears in the Elseworlds series Superman & Batman: Generations. He serves the Wayne family before dying in 1967. His spirit remains around to give Bruce advice, although Bruce is unsure if this is actually Alfred's ghost or a hallucination.
- In Batman: Castle of the Bat, Alfred is reimagined as Alfredo, a hunchback based on Igor who acts as Bruce Wayne's assistant.
- In Batman/Demon: A Tragedy, Alfred Pennyworth is the alter ego of Merlin, who bound Bruce Wayne to Etrigan centuries prior and chose to serve him to make up for his actions. Merlin/Alfred periodically erases Bruce's memory to prevent Etrigan from escaping. Every couple of decades, Etrigan begins to escape, initially targeting criminals but progressing to attack the innocent until Merlin wipes his memory again.
- In Batman: Dark Allegiances, Alfred is still Bruce Wayne's butler as Bruce faces various fascist-themed versions of his rogues gallery, but after the government asks Bruce to become an official American agent during World War II, Alfred joins Bruce and Selina Kyle in the field as the new Robin.
- In Batman: Dark Knight Dynasty, in a timeline where Thomas and Martha Wayne were not killed in Crime Alley, Alfred assists the adult Bruce in investigating his parents' deaths when they apparently fall out of their penthouse after Bruce's wedding to Julie Madison. Their death is revealed to have been due to the influence of Vandal Savage's henchwoman the Scarecrone when the Waynes threatened his plan to acquire the meteor that gave him his immortality. While studying available information on the meteor, Alfred discovers a record of the unusual energy reading it emits, but this discovery triggers a booby-trap that destroys Wayne Manor and kills him. Five centuries later, Bruce's descendant Brenda Wayne discovers a fragmented recording of Alfred and the energy reading that assists her in her own investigations into Savage's activities.
- In League of Justice, where the Justice League exists in a world where magic is prominent, Alfred is reinvented as a zombie-like figure, reinforcing Bruce's idea that science is more reliable than magic despite its greater potential power.
- Alfred plays a prominent role in the "Vampire Batman" trilogy, in which Batman is turned into a vampire to fight Count Dracula, (Note: Doug Moench (w), Kelley Jones (p), Malcolm Jones (i). Batman & Dracula: Red Rain (1991). DC Comics.) subsequently forging Batman's weapons to use against the remaining members of Dracula's "family" after the Joker takes command of the remaining vampires. (Note: Doug Moench (w), Kelley Jones (p), Malcolm Jones (i). Batman: Bloodstorm (1994). DC Comics.) When Batman succumbs to his vampire instincts, Alfred must work with Commissioner Gordon after the Dark Knight begins to kill his old enemies, Alfred forced to accept that his master would never have killed in the first place and aware that eventually he will turn his thirst on the innocent. At the conclusion of the trilogy, with Gordon being hunted by Two-Face and Killer Croc in the remains of the Batcave, Alfred sacrifices his life to allow the currently weakened Batman to drink his blood, affirming his faith that his old master just needs the strength to save Gordon and the people of Gotham one last time, even if Batman subsequently allows himself to die to end the threat that he has become. (Note: Doug Moench (w), Kelley Jones (p), Malcolm Jones (i). Batman: Crimson Mist (1998). DC Comics.)

=== Earth-3 ===
An alternate universe version of Alfred Pennyworth from Earth-3 appears in the "Trinity War" storyline. This version is the leader of the Secret Society.

=== Murphyverse ===
Alfred Pennyworth appears in stories set in the Murphyverse continuity, written by Sean Murphy.

In Batman: White Knight, Alfred is revealed to be dying from an unknown disease, causing him to be bedridden. Bruce Wayne recruits the help of Victor Fries in developing a cure for Alfred, as well as Victor's wife Nora. Without Alfred at his side, Bruce also takes a more violent approach to crimefighting, causing concern from his allies. Eventually, Barbara Gordon and Dick Grayson are informed of Alfred's condition, and they also help with the development of the cure. Following a lengthy battle against various supervillains in Gotham, Batman returns home severely injured. He later wakes up and finds his wounds attended to, while Alfred has passed away, having used the last of his strength to tend to Bruce. He also leaves a letter behind, which Bruce opens and reads alongside Barbara and Dick after they deal with Jack Napier / Joker.

In Batman: Curse of the White Knight, Alfred is revealed to have previously encountered a priest of the Order of St. Dumas, later revealed to be Jason Blood. The priest entrusted him with a journal belonging to Bruce's ancestor, Edmond Wayne; the journal itself had been lost for years, ending up in the hands of the Joker for some time. Alfred wished to destroy the journal, but was stopped by Leslie Thompkins, who told him that Bruce had the right to know about this journal; thus, Alfred left behind a letter before his death, instructing Bruce to recover Edmond's journal.

=== Nightwing: The New Order ===
In this alternate reality, Nightwing ends an ongoing feud between superpowered beings by activating a device that de-powers 90 percent of the super powered population. This builds to a future where superpowers are outlawed and any superpowered being must take inhibitor medications or be imprisoned. When Bruce is killed during the feud, Alfred inherits his estate and moves to Arizona, while allowing Dick Grayson and his son Jake to stay in Wayne Manor.

When Grayson discovers that Jake is beginning to develop powers, his house is invaded by his own police force, the Crusaders, to take Jake away. Alfred attempts to strike one of the Crusaders, who kills him.

=== Tangent Comics ===
An alternate universe version of Alfred Pennyworth appears in the 1997 Tangent Comics one-shot issue Green Lantern. This version is the head of a publishing company that owns the House of Mystery.

== Collected editions ==
Title	Material collected	Published date	ISBN
Batman Allies: Alfred Pennyworth	Batman (vol. 1) #16, 31, Detective Comics #83, 356, 501-502, 806, 807, Untold Legends of the Batman #2, Batman Annual (vol. 1) #13, Batman: Shadow of the Bat #31, Batman: Gotham Adventures #16, Batman Eternal #31, Batman Annual (vol. 2) #1, 3	March 2020	978-1401298944
Pennyworth	Pennyworth #1-7	July 2022	978-1779515674

== In other media ==
=== Television ===
==== Live-action ====
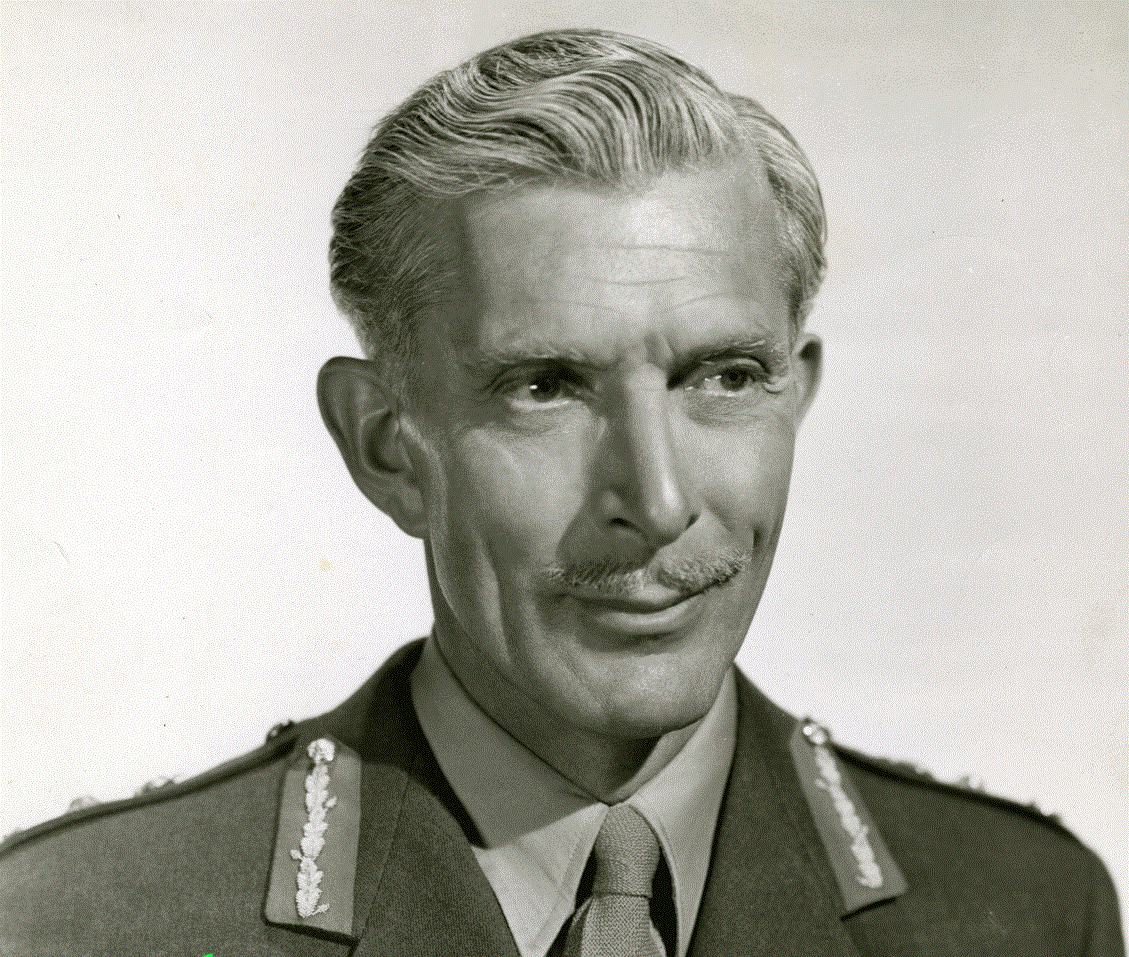
Alan Napier portrayed Alfred in Batman (1966)

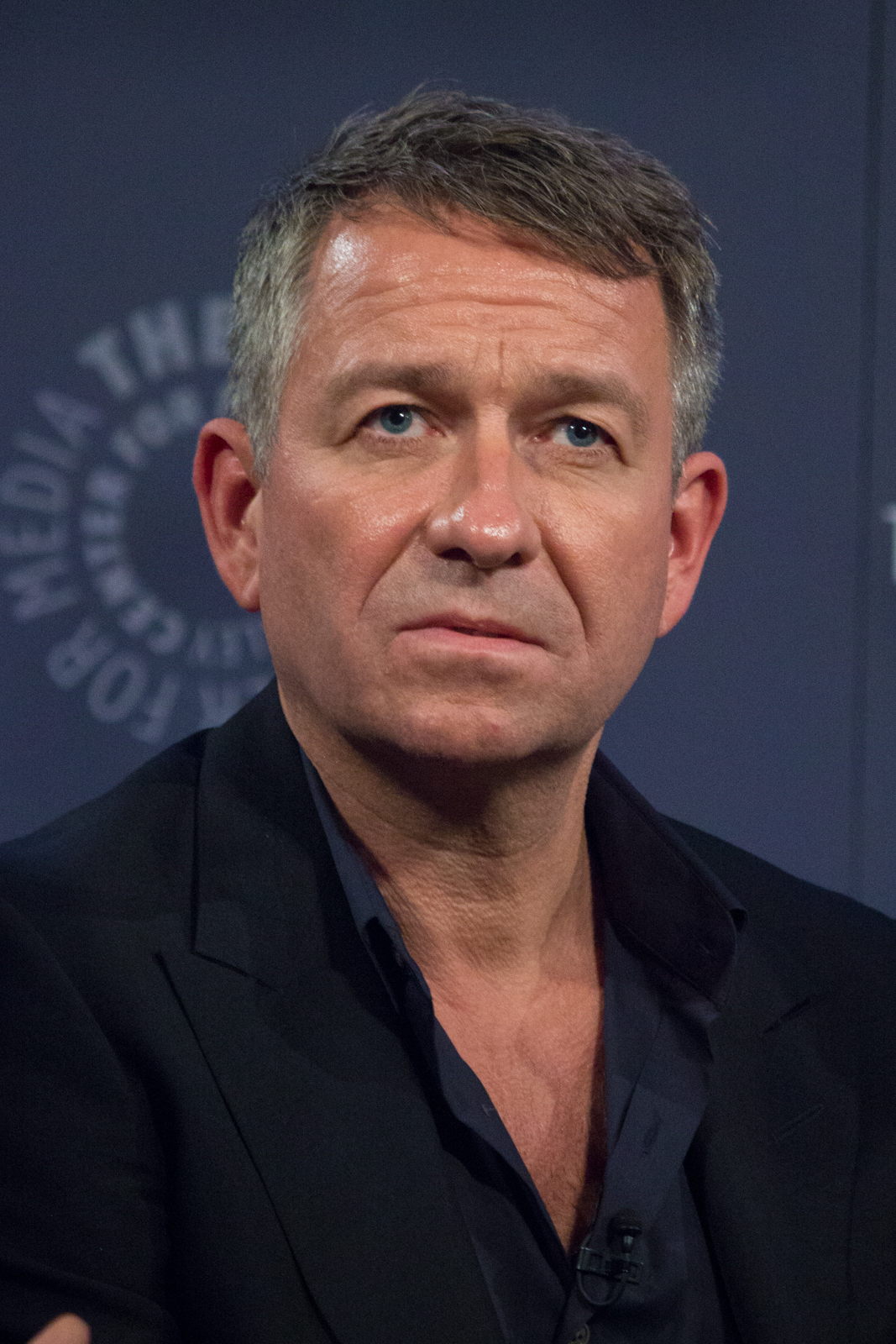
Sean Pertwee portrays Alfred Pennyworth in Gotham.

- Alfred appears in Batman (1966), portrayed by Alan Napier. No surname was given for this version as "Pennyworth" was not introduced in the comics until after the series had ended production.
- Alfred Pennyworth appears in a 1989 Diet Coke commercial, portrayed by Michael Gough.
- Alfred Pennyworth, based on his portrayal in Batman & Robin (1997), appears in a commercial promoting the home media release of the film, portrayed by Ian Abercrombie.
- Alfred Pennyworth appears in a series of Batman OnStar commercials, portrayed again by Michael Gough.
- Alfred Pennyworth appears in Birds of Prey, portrayed again by Ian Abercrombie.
- A young Alfred Pennyworth appears in Gotham, portrayed by Sean Pertwee.
  - Alfred appears in the prequel series Pennyworth, portrayed by Jack Bannon. This series explores his past as a soldier in the Special Air Service (SAS), his affair with the Queen of England, and his involvement in the British Civil War leading into the events of V for Vendetta.
- Alfred Pennyworth appears in Titans, portrayed by an uncredited actor. This version died sometime before the third season.

==== Animation ====
- Alfred Pennyworth appears in The Batman/Superman Hour, voiced by Olan Soule.
- Alfred Pennyworth appears in the Challenge of the Superfriends episode "Wanted: The Super Friends", voiced by William Callaway.
- Alfred Pennyworth appears in The Super Powers Team: Galactic Guardians episode "The Fear", voiced by Andre Stojka.
- Alfred Pennyworth appears in television series set in the DC Animated Universe, voiced initially by Clive Revill and subsequently by Efrem Zimbalist Jr..
- Alfred Pennyworth appears in The Batman (2004), voiced by Alastair Duncan.
- Alfred Pennyworth appears in Batman: The Brave and the Bold, voiced by James Garrett.
  - Additionally, the episode "The Super-Batman of Planet X!" features a robot inspired by Alfred named Alpha-Red (voiced by James Arnold Taylor) who serves the Batman of Zur-En-Arrh.
- Alfred Pennyworth appears in Young Justice, voiced by Jeff Bennett.
- Alfred Pennyworth appears in Beware the Batman, voiced by JB Blanc. This version is a former member of MI6 and Katana's godfather.
- Alfred Pennyworth appears in Lego DC Comics: Batman Be-Leaguered, voiced by Nolan North.
- Alfred Pennyworth appears in Teen Titans Go!.
- Alfred Pennyworth appears in the Scooby-Doo and Guess Who? episode "What a Night for a Dark Knight!", voiced by Steven Weber. This version is a family friend of Daphne Blake.
- Alfred Pennyworth appears in Harley Quinn, voiced by Tom Hollander. This version operates as the vigilante Macaroni via a wig equipped with various gadgets.
- Alfred Pennyworth appears in DC Super Hero Girls, voiced again by Keith Ferguson.
- A composite version of Alfred Pennyworth appears in Batman: Caped Crusader, voiced by Jason Watkins. This version has an appearance of Alfred Beagle, but has the moustache like Alfred Pennyworth.
- Alfred Pennyworth appears in Bat-Fam, voiced by James Cromwell.
- Alfred Pennyworth appears in Batwheels, voiced by Alfred Molina. He is the builder of M.O.E., the mechanic of the title characters.

=== Film ===
==== Live-action ====
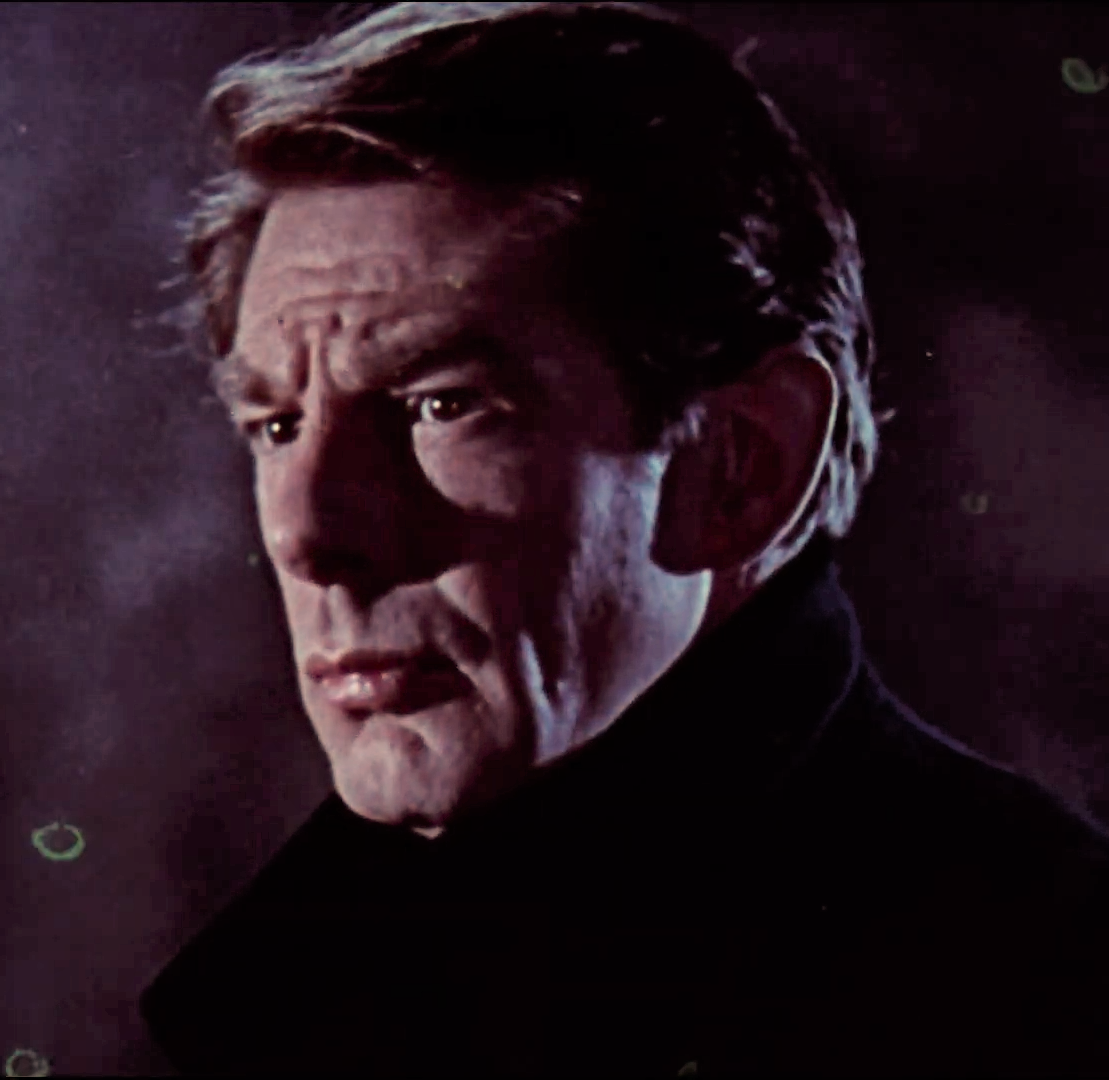
Michael Gough played Alfred Pennyworth in the Burton/Schumacher Batman film series

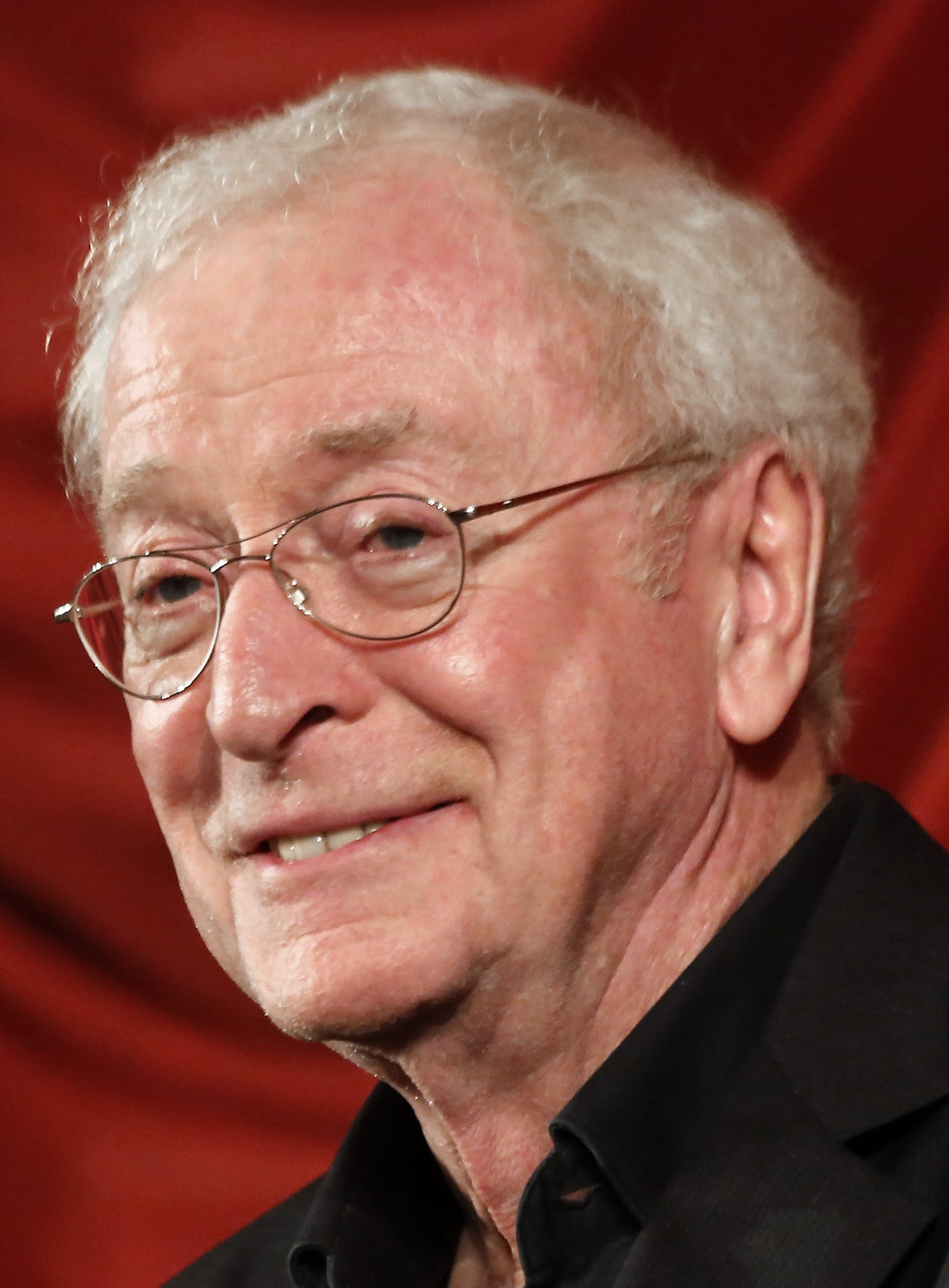
Michael Caine played Alfred in The Dark Knight trilogy

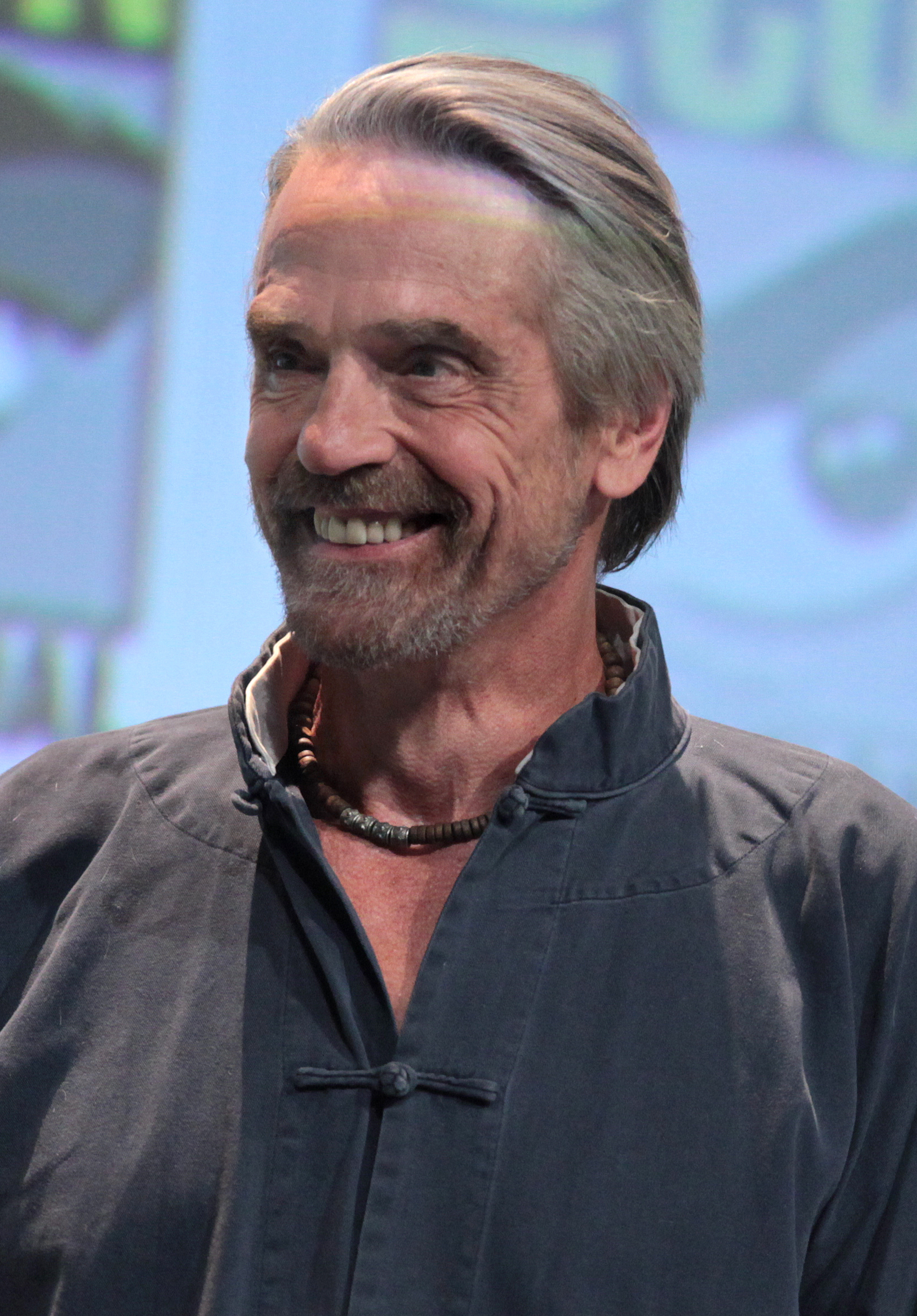
Jeremy Irons portrayed Alfred in the DC Extended Universe

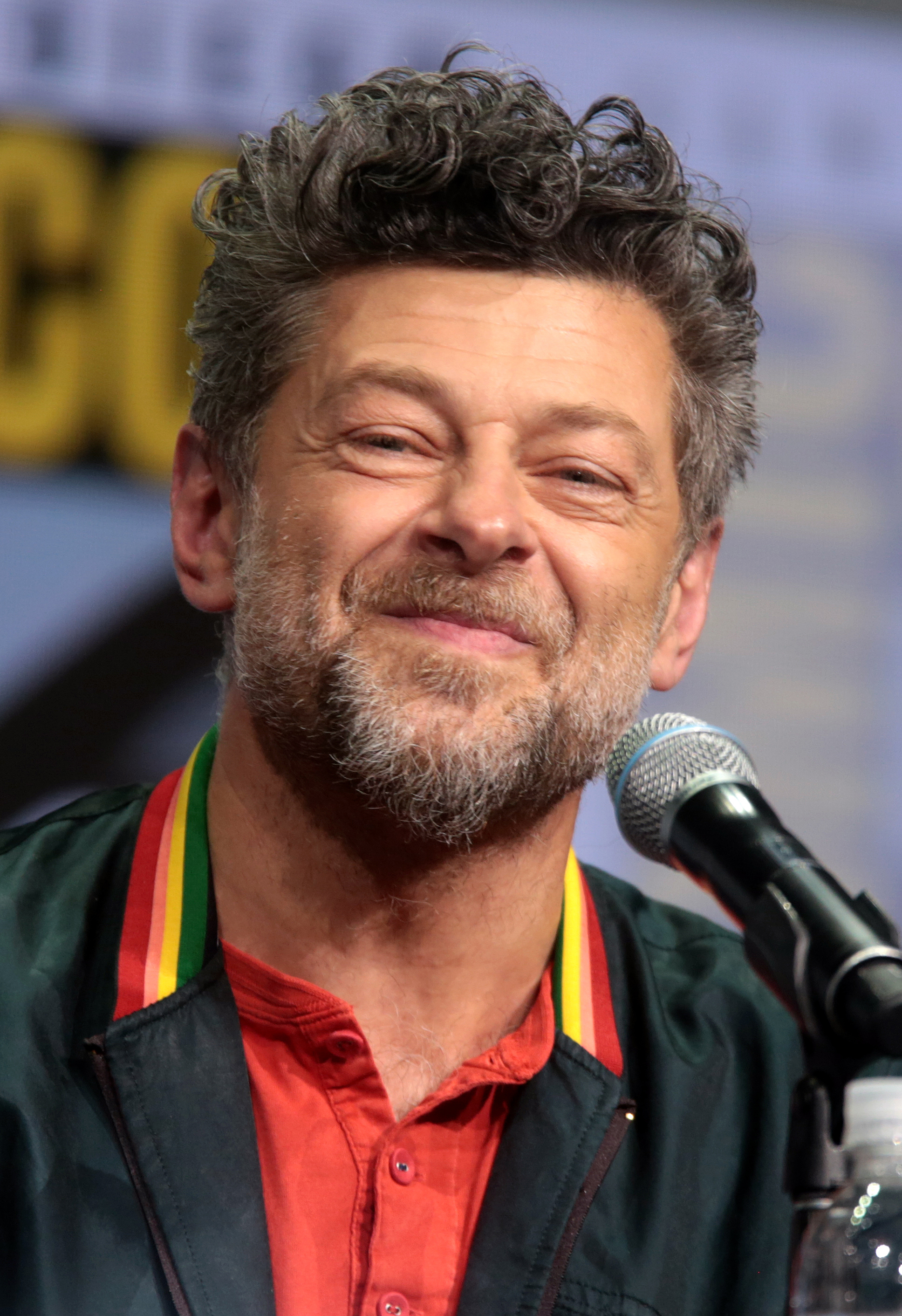
Andy Serkis portrayed Alfred in the 2022 film The Batman

- Alfred appears in Batman (1943), portrayed by William Austin.
- Alfred appears in Batman and Robin (1949), portrayed by Eric Wilton.
- Alfred appears in the Batman (1966) film of the same name, portrayed again by Alan Napier.
- Alfred Pennyworth appears in the Tim Burton/Joel Schumacher Batman film series, portrayed by Michael Gough in the present and Jon Simmons in flashbacks. This version is the uncle of Barbara Wilson.
- Alfred Pennyworth appears in Christopher Nolan's The Dark Knight trilogy, portrayed by Michael Caine. This version is a former senior NCO in the SAS and a veteran of tours of duty in Malaya, Cyprus, Borneo, Aden, West Germany, and twice in Northern Ireland.
- Alfred Pennyworth appears in films set in the DC Extended Universe, portrayed by Jeremy Irons.
- Alfred Pennyworth appears in Joker, portrayed by Douglas Hodge.
- Alfred Pennyworth appears in The Batman (2022), portrayed by Andy Serkis. This version is a former MI6 intelligence officer who served as the head of security to Thomas Wayne and has a hostile relationship with Bruce before they eventually reconcile.

==== Animation ====
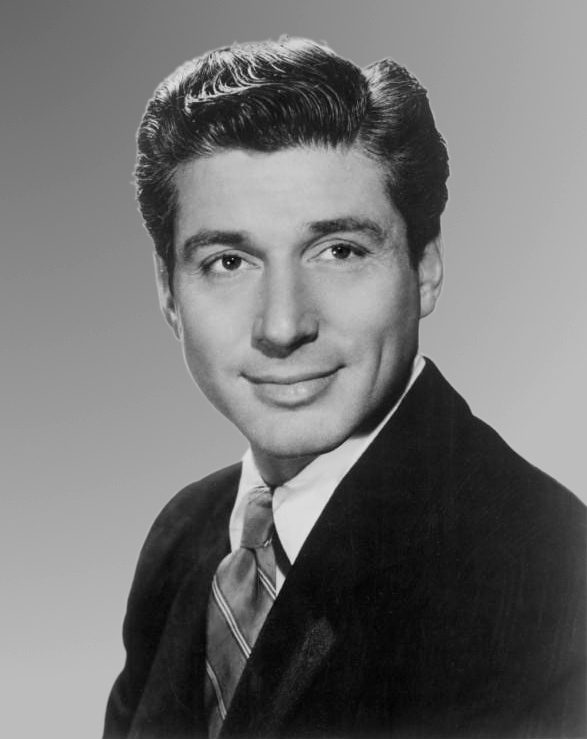
Efrem Zimbalist Jr. voiced Alfred in the DC Animated Universe

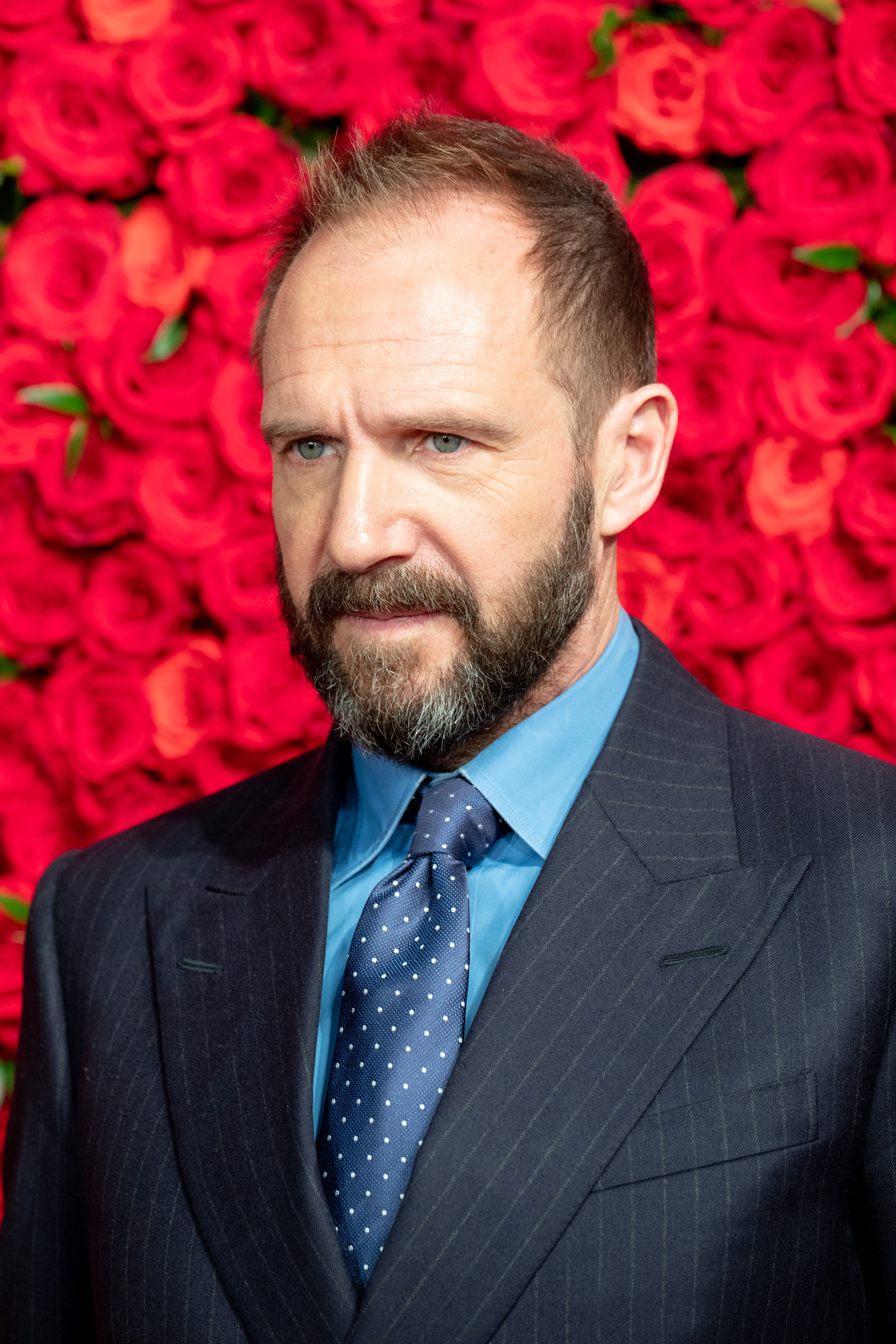
Ralph Fiennes voiced Alfred in The Lego Batman Movie

- Alfred Pennyworth appears in the DCAU films Batman: Mask of the Phantasm, Batman & Mr. Freeze: SubZero and Batman: Mystery of the Batwoman, voiced again by Efrem Zimbalist Jr.
- Alfred Pennyworth appears in The Batman vs. Dracula, voiced again by Alastair Duncan.
- Alfred Pennyworth appears in Batman: Gotham Knight, voiced by David McCallum.
- Alfred Pennyworth appears in Superman/Batman: Public Enemies, voiced by Alan Oppenheimer.
- Alfred Pennyworth appears in Batman: Under the Red Hood, voiced by Jim Piddock.
- Alfred Pennyworth appears in Batman: Year One, voiced by Jeff Bennett.
- Alfred Pennyworth appears in Justice League: Doom, voiced by Robin Atkin Downes.
- Alfred Pennyworth appears in Batman: The Dark Knight Returns, voiced by Michael Jackson.
- Alfred Pennyworth appears in films set in the DC Animated Movie Universe (DCAMU):
  - Alfred appears in Son of Batman and Batman vs. Robin, voiced again by David McCallum.
  - Alfred appears in Batman: Bad Blood, voiced again by James Garrett.
  - Alfred appears in Batman: Hush, voiced again by James Garrett.
  - Alfred makes a non-speaking cameo appearance in The Death of Superman.
- Alfred Pennyworth makes a non-speaking cameo appearance in Lego Batman: The Movie - DC Super Heroes Unite.
- Alfred Pennyworth appears in Batman: Assault on Arkham, voiced by Martin Jarvis.
- Alfred Pennyworth appears in the Batman Unlimited film series, voiced again by Alastair Duncan.
- Alfred Pennyworth makes a non-speaking cameo appearance in Lego DC Comics Super Heroes: Justice League – Gotham City Breakout.
- Alfred Pennyworth appears in Batman: The Killing Joke, voiced again by Brian George.
- Alfred Pennyworth appears in Batman: Return of the Caped Crusaders and Batman vs. Two-Face, voiced by Steven Weber.
- Alfred Pennyworth appears in The Lego Movie franchise, voiced by Ralph Fiennes.
- Alfred Pennyworth appears in DC Super Heroes vs. Eagle Talon, voiced by Frogman.
- Alfred Pennyworth appears in Teen Titans Go! To the Movies.
- Alfred Pennyworth appears in Batman: Gotham by Gaslight, voiced by Anthony Head.
- Alfred Pennyworth appears in Lego DC Batman: Family Matters, voiced by Nolan North.
- Alfred Pennyworth appears in Batman vs. Teenage Mutant Ninja Turtles, voiced again by Brian George.
- Alfred Pennyworth appears in Batman Ninja, voiced by Hōchū Ōtsuka and Adam Croasdell in the Japanese and English versions respectively.
- Alfred Pennyworth makes a non-speaking cameo appearance in Batman: Death in the Family.
- Alfred Pennyworth makes a non-speaking cameo appearance in Space Jam: A New Legacy.
- Alfred Pennyworth appears in Lego DC Shazam! Magic and Monsters, voiced by Nolan North.
- Alfred Pennyworth appears in Batman: The Long Halloween, voiced again by Alastair Duncan.
- Alfred Pennyworth appears in Batman: The Doom That Came to Gotham, voiced again by Brian George.
- Alfred Pennyworth appears in Merry Little Batman, voiced by James Cromwell.
- Alfred Pennyworth appears in Justice League: Crisis on Infinite Earths, voiced again by Alastair Duncan.
- A character based on Alfred Pennyworth named Acatzin appears in Aztec Batman: Clash of Empires, voiced by Roberto Sosa.
- Alfred Pennyworth appears in Batman: Knightfall, voiced by Simon Templeman.

=== Video games ===
- Alfred Pennyworth appears in Batman: Vengeance, voiced again by Efrem Zimbalist Jr.
- Alfred Pennyworth appears in the Batman Begins film tie-in game, voiced by Michael Caine.
- Alfred Pennyworth appears in Scribblenauts Unmasked: A DC Comics Adventure, voiced by Jim Piddock.
- Alfred Pennyworth appears in The Dark Knight Rises tie-in game, voiced by Steven French.
- Alfred Pennyworth appears in Batman (2013), voiced by David Lodge.
- Alfred Pennyworth appears in Batman: The Telltale Series, voiced by Enn Reitel.
- Alfred Pennyworth appears in Batman: The Enemy Within, voiced again by Enn Reitel.
- Alfred Pennyworth appears in Gotham Knights, voiced by Gildart Jackson. This version provides technical assistance and moral support to the eponymous Gotham Knights following Bruce Wayne's death.
- Alfred Pennyworth appears in Justice League: Cosmic Chaos, voiced again by Alastair Duncan.

==== Lego series ====
- Alfred Pennyworth appears as a playable character in Lego Batman: The Videogame, voiced by Keith Ferguson.
- Alfred Pennyworth appears as a playable character in Lego Batman 2: DC Super Heroes, voiced by Steve Blum.
- The comic book and Batman (1966) incarnations of Alfred Pennyworth appear as separate playable characters in Lego Batman 3: Beyond Gotham, with the former voiced by Robin Atkin Downes.
- Alfred Pennyworth appears in Lego Dimensions, voiced again by Robin Atkin Downes.
- Alfred Pennyworth appears as an NPC in Lego DC Super-Villains. Additionally, The Lego Movie 2: The Second Part incarnation of Pennyworth appears as a playable DLC character.
- Alfred Pennyworth appears as a playable character in Lego Batman: Legacy of the Dark Knight, voiced by Harry Myers.

==== Batman: Arkham ====
Alfred Pennyworth appears in the Batman: Arkham franchise, voiced primarily by Martin Jarvis and by Hugh Fraser in Batman: Arkham VR.

=== Miscellaneous ===
- Alfred Pennyworth appears in the BBC radio drama adaptation of "Batman: Knightfall", voiced by Michael Gough.
- Alfred Pennyworth appears in the Batman Black and White motion comic, voiced by Michael Dobson.
- Alfred Pennyworth appears in Smallville Season 11.
- Alfred Pennyworth appears in Injustice: Gods Among Us. This version is a member of Batman's Insurgency.
- Alfred Pennyworth appears in Holy Musical B@man!, portrayed by Chris Allen.
- Alfred Pennyworth appears in DC Heroes United, voiced by Andrew Wheildon-Dennis.
- A character based on Alfred Pennyworth called Alfred Copperworth appears in World of Warcraft: Wrath of the Lich King.
- A character based on Alfred Pennyworth called Aloysius Pennyworth appears in the Danganronpa franchise. He serves as the butler of Byakuya Togami.
