= Pow Wow Smith =

Fictional comic book character

- Pow Wow Smith from Western Comics #46 (July 1954), artist Carmine Infantino.

Publication information
- Publisher: DC Comics
- First appearance: Detective Comics #151 (September 1949)
- Created by: Don Cameron (writer); Carmine Infantino (artist)

In-story information
- Alter ego: Ohiyesa Smith
- Team affiliations: Rough Bunch; Justice Riders
- Partnerships: Hank Brown
- Abilities: Skilled detective, forensic specialist, bush tracker, expert marksman

Ohiyesa "Pow Wow" Smith is a fictional Western hero published by DC Comics. Created by writer Don Cameron and penciler Carmine Infantino, he is a Sioux who is the sheriff of the small Western town of Elkhorn, where he is known as a master detective. He prefers to be addressed by his proper name, Ohiyesa, but people called him "Pow Wow" so stubbornly that he eventually gives up and accepts the nickname among them.

Originally, the Pow Wow Smith character was located in the modern West. Later stories were set in the 19th century. It was eventually retconned that the Old West character was the ancestor of the modern-day character. Since then, Smith has remained a generation legacy, and a historical figure in the DC Universe, meeting other heroes in their occasional time travel stories.

== Publication history ==
Smith first appeared in Detective Comics #151, the only Western feature in the book. After four years as a regular feature in Detective Comics, his strip became the lead feature of Western Comics, which ran until 1961. Much of the art during the Detective period was by Leonard Starr, and when Smith found a home in Western Comics, his original illustrator Infantino returned. Stories were by France Herron and later Gardner Fox.

Smith also starred in the premiere issue of All-Star Western's second volume.

== Fictional character biography ==
Ohiyesa Smith is a Sioux Native American who leaves his native Red Deer Valley to learn about foreign culture, eventually becoming the sheriff of Elkhorn. For most of his adventures, Pow Wow's girlfriend (and later fiancée) is the Native American maiden Fleetfoot, daughter of Chief Thundercloud. Fleetfloot aids Pow Wow in a number of adventures.

=== U.S. Marshal Pow Wow Smith ===
U.S. Marshal Ohiyesa Smith, a present-day descendant of the original Pow Wow Smith, appears in Robin (vol. 2) Annual #6, a Western pastiche that also featured a modern-day version of Nighthawk. This Ohiyesa attended college in the East, then returned to Red Deer Valley, seeking to modernize his tribe. As a U.S. Marshall, he too takes the name Pow Wow Smith, but continues to live in Red Deer Valley. The modern-day Pow Wow Smith works with Robin and other heroes to take down the modern-day Trigger Twins, who unlike their 19th-century antecedents are homicidal criminals.

== In other media ==
Ohiyesa Smith appears in the Justice League Unlimited episode "The Once and Future Thing Part One: Weird Western Tales", voiced by Jonathan Joss.
