= Donald Clough Cameron =

American comic book writer (1905–1954)

Don Cameron
- Born: Donald Clough Cameron; December 21, 1905 Detroit, Michigan, U.S.
- Died: November 17, 1954 (aged 48) New York City, U.S.
- Area: Writer
- Pseudonyms: Don Cameron; C.A.M. Donne

Donald Clough Cameron (December 21, 1905 – November 17, 1954) was an American writer of detective novels and comic books. He is credited with creating several supporting characters and villains in DC Comics' line of Batman comic books.

== Career ==
Donald Clough Cameron graduated from St. John's Military Academy in Delafield, Wisconsin, and became a crime reporter for the Detroit Free Press in 1924 and later worked for the Windsor Star in Windsor, Ontario. In the 1930s, he settled in New York City and became a writer, publishing short stories, sometimes signed with the pseudonym C.A.M. Donne, for pulps and comic books.

Between 1939 and 1946, Cameron wrote six detective novels, three of which featured the young criminologist and detective Abelard Voss, who liked to take philosophical reflections during his investigations. The sixth and final novel by Don Cameron, White for a Shroud, features the character of Andrew Brant, the only journalist in a local newspaper, who investigates a series of murders committed in an American town isolated from the outside world by a snowstorm.

Cameron made several notable contributions to the Batman mythos. The story "Here Comes Alfred!" in Batman #16 (April–May 1943) by Cameron and Bob Kane introduced Alfred as Bruce Wayne's butler. Cameron co-created Tweedledum and Tweedledee in Detective Comics #74 (April 1943) and the Cavalier in Detective Comics #81 (Nov. 1943). His story "Brothers in Crime!" in Batman #12 (Aug.–Sept. 1942) featured "Batman's Hall of Trophies" a precursor to the Batcave, which debuted in Detective Comics #83 (Jan. 1944). Cameron and Win Mortimer created Batman's Batboat in Detective Comics #110 (April 1946). In addition, Cameron was one of the writers of the Batman comic strip for the McClure Newspaper Syndicate.

His work on Superman includes creating the Toyman in Action Comics #64 (Sept. 1943) and writing the earliest Superboy stories in More Fun Comics.

Cameron created Liberty Belle in Boy Commandos #1 (Winter 1942) and Pow Wow Smith in Detective Comics #151 (Sept. 1949). He was one of the writers of DC's Hopalong Cassidy licensed series based on the film and TV Western hero. Other comic book work by Cameron includes Aquaman, Congo Bill, and the Western character Nighthawk.

Donald Clough Cameron died of cancer in New York City in November 1954. His final comics story "The Giant Eagle Robberies" was published posthumously in Hopalong Cassidy #99 (March 1955).

== Other similarly-named creators ==
Donald Clough Cameron should not be confused with the similarly named Don Cameron, an artist who was also active during the Golden Age of Comic Books, nor with an unrelated Don Cameron, a comics artist who worked on the Cyberella series in the 1990s.

== Bibliography ==
=== Comic books ===
- Action Comics #58, 61–68, 70–71, 77–83, 85–86, 88–90, 99–100, 102, 107, 109, 119, 148, 151, 192 (1943–1954)
- Adventure Comics #91, 103–121, 123–128, 132, 138, 141, 147–149, 151, 154, 156, 158, 160–166, 168, 171–174 (1944–1952)
- Batman #12–17, 19–21, 23–30, 32, 36, 38, 46 (1942–1948)
- Boy Commandos #1–2, 6–8, 12–13, 16, 27–28, 30, 33 (1942–1949)
- Detective Comics #70, 73–75, 79, 81–83, 86, 89, 96, 98–101, 105–111, 114–117, 131, 151–152, 154–156 (1942–1950)
- Hopalong Cassidy #86–90, 92–99 (1954–1955)
- More Fun Comics #101–107 (1945–1946)
- Star-Spangled Comics #20–49, 51–68 (1943–1947)
- Superboy #6, 11, 19 (1950–1952)
- Superman #23–24, 26–44, 47, 49–50, 53, 60 (1943–1949)
- Western Comics #2, 6, 15, 18, 21–28, 30, 32–42, 44–47 (1948–1954)
- World's Finest Comics #12–13, 15, 17–21, 23, 25, 28–31, 33–34, 45, 47–48, 61, 63 (1943–1953)

=== Novels ===
==== Abelard Voss series ====
- Murder's Coming (1939)
- Grave Without Grass (1940)
- And So He Had to Die (1941)

==== Other novels ====
- Death at Her Elbow (1940)
- Dig Another Grave (1946)
- White for a Shroud (1947)

=== Pulps ===
==== As Donald Clough Cameron ====
- Mood for Murder (1939)
- In the Dark (1940)
- Benjy Takes a Holiday (1944)
- Attar of Homicide (1944)

==== As C.A.M. Donne ====
- Isle of Ghouls (1935)
- Marriage for Murder (1937)
- Vengeance of the Severed Hands (1937)
- Judgment of the Ghost God (1937)
- A Bride for the General (1939)
- White Man's Magic (1941)
- Rendezvous (1941)
- No More Raids (1941)

Preceded by Bill Finger	Batman writer 1942–1948	Succeeded by Bill Finger
Preceded by Joseph Greene	"Batman" feature in Detective Comics writer 1942–1948	Succeeded by Edmond Hamilton
Preceded by Jerry Siegel	Superman writer 1943–1949	Succeeded by William Woolfolk
Preceded by Jerry Siegel	"Superman" feature in Action Comics writer 1943–1947	Succeeded by Alvin Schwartz
