= Whitney Ellsworth =

American writer (1908–1980)

- Ellsworth, probably in the 1970s
- Born: Frederick Whitney Ellsworth; November 27, 1908 Brooklyn, New York, U.S.
- Died: September 7, 1980 (aged 71) North Hollywood, U.S.
- Areas: Comic book editor, television producer
- Pseudonyms: Frederic Wells, Fred Whitby, Richard Fielding (w/ Robert Maxwell)
- Notable works: Batman; The Adventures of Superman (TV series)

Frederick Whitney "Whit" Ellsworth (November 27, 1908 – September 7, 1980) was an American comic book editor and sometime writer and artist for DC Comics during the period known to historians and fans as the Golden Age of Comic Books. He was also DC's "movie studio contact", becoming both a producer and story editor on the TV series The Adventures of Superman.

== Biography ==
Ellsworth was born in Brooklyn, New York. He took a cartooning course at the YMCA in Brooklyn and worked on the syndicated features Dumb Dora (for Newspaper Feature Service), Embarrassing Moments (providing plots, pencils and inks for both) and Just Kids (assisting with pencils and inks, for the King Features Syndicate) between 1927 and 1929. In the early 1930s, he began working on another syndicated feature, Tillie the Toiler, for King, as well as writing gag cartoons, articles and features for the Newark Star-Eagle/Ledger newspaper (1931–1934), also finding time to work on a number of pulp magazine stories throughout the 1930s.

=== Comics ===
In late 1934, he became associated with Major Malcolm Wheeler-Nicholson's fledgling company National Allied Publications, later known as DC Comics. Initially an assistant editor, before becoming associate editor (1936–38), Ellsworth worked on such titles as Billy the Kid, Little Linda and More Fun Comics, as well as producing cover roughs for several years. Ellsworth left the company in c. 1937-38 for a brief hiatus in California before returning to DC a couple of years later. He subsequently served as editorial director until c. 1951–1953, in particular on such titles as the flagship titles Action Comics, Adventure Comics, Batman, Detective Comics and Superman between 1940 and 1951, and later on such diverse titles as The Adventures of Alan Ladd, All-Star Comics, Green Lantern, Mr. District Attorney, Real Fact Comics, Real Screen Comics, Scribbly, Superboy and Wonder Woman (among others) between 1948 and 1951. In 1945, he licensed The Fox and the Crow and other animated characters from their distributor, Columbia Pictures.

=== Pulps ===
Ellsworth also wrote short stories for the pulp titles Black Bat, G-Man (including the Dan Fowler novel "Spotlight on Murder" in September 1942) and The Phantom Detective (for which title he certainly ghosted two pulps – #76 Murder at the World's Fair and #77 The Forty Thieves in June and July 1939), among others.

=== Newspaper strip ===
Ellsworth was also the first writer on the Batman & Robin newspaper strip, which appeared first on Sundays and later on weekdays. Featuring artwork primarily from Sheldon Moldoff and Joe Giella, Ellsworth wrote the strip between 1966 and 1970, whereupon E. Nelson Bridwell took over for a couple of years.

== TV and film ==
In addition to his extensive comics work, Ellsworth "was DC's movie studio contact" on a number of projects, keeping his "editorial director" title, but working mainly on "DC properties in Hollywood" between c. 1951–1959.

=== The Superman serials ===
Ellsworth was the representative from National Comics during the production of the 1948 serial Superman, a position which gave him absolute control of the script and production. He initially objected to casting of Kirk Alyn as the lead, whom producer Sam Katzman had found by looking through studio photographs. This was made even worse when Alyn came in for a screen test, during filming on a historical film, with a goatee and moustache. These initial reservations were eventually overcome and Alyn got the part. Columbia's advertising claimed that they could not get an actor to fill the role so they had hired Superman himself. Kirk Alyn was merely playing Clark Kent.

=== The Adventures of Superman ===
Most notably, Ellsworth was a consultant on the serial sequel Atom Man vs. Superman (1950) (also with Kirk Alyn), and co-wrote the feature film Superman and the Mole Men (1951) before becoming a producer, episode writer, and script editor on the subsequent live-action TV series The Adventures of Superman (both starring George Reeves as the Man of Steel). In 1958, he created a pilot titled Superpup, which attempted to capitalize on that series' success by recasting the Superman mythos in a fictional universe populated by dogs instead of people.

Three years later, Ellsworth helped produce another, ultimately aborted pilot for another spin-off series called The Adventures of Superboy.

=== Other ===
According to noted comics historian Jerry Bails, Ellsworth was also a consultant on the 1943 Batman serial and its 1949 sequel, Batman and Robin; the Superman serial starring Kirk Alyn that was a precursor to the later live-action Superman features, and the Congo Bill serial (1949). He is listed as having been – for "one week only" – a consultant on the 1966 Batman TV series (with Adam West), and a writer for the Superman radio show during the war years.

In addition, he wrote the Off-Broadway production Maiden Voyage (1935), for the TV series The Millionaire^{1} (1955) between c. 1954–56 and produced another pilot in 1961, this time for a "comedy-detective series starring Sheree North" to be called Here's O'Hare (ABC did not pursue the show).

Ellsworth is also said by Bails to have helped co-write The Godfather.

== Later life ==
Ellsworth left DC (shortly after leaving the Batman newspaper strip) in 1970/1971. He died on September 7, 1980, in North Hollywood. In 1985, he was posthumously named as one of the honorees by DC Comics in the company's 50th anniversary publication Fifty Who Made DC Great.

=== References in popular culture ===
- The actor/film historian Jim Beaver, preparing a biography of Adventures of Superman star George Reeves, played a character called "Ellsworth" in the TV series Deadwood (2004). At his request, producer David Milch okayed the character being given the first name "Whitney" in homage to Reeves's Adventures of Superman producer.
- The actor Eric Johnson played the character Whitney Fordman in the Superman TV series Smallville (2001–2011). The name Whitney was a clear homage to Ellsworth, the producer (after Robert Maxwell) of the original Superman TV series.
