= Superman (TV series) =

1988 American animated television series

- Genre: Action; Adventure; Superhero
- Based on: Superman by: Jerry Siegel; Joe Shuster
- Written by: Cherie Wilkerson; Marv Wolfman; Michael Reaves; Larry DiTillio; Buzz Dixon; Martin Pasko
- Directed by: Cosmo Anzilotti; Bill Hutton; Tony Love
- Voices of: Beau Weaver; Ginny McSwain; Mark L. Taylor; Stanley Ralph Ross; Michael Bell; Lynne Marie Stewart; Alan Oppenheimer; Tress MacNeille
- Narrated by: William Woodson (opening narration)
- Opening theme: "Superman March" (composed by John Williams)
- Composer: Ron Jones
- Country of origin: United States
- Original language: English
- No. of seasons: 1
- No. of episodes: 13 (26 segments)

Production
- Executive producers: Joe Ruby; Ken Spears
- Producer: Larry Huber
- Running time: 22 minutes (2 11-minute segments)
- Production companies: Ruby-Spears Enterprises; DC Comics; Toei Animation; Daiwon Animation

Original release
- Network: CBS
- Release: September 17 – December 10, 1988

Superman is a 1988 American animated Saturday morning television series produced by Ruby-Spears Enterprises that aired on CBS from September 17 to December 10, 1988, featuring the DC Comics superhero of the same name (coinciding with the character's 50th anniversary, along with the live-action Superboy TV series that year). Veteran comic book writer Marv Wolfman was the head story editor, and comic book artist Gil Kane provided character designs.

== Format ==
The series was the second animated Superman television series (after the Filmation-produced The New Adventures of Superman). While its characterization was in keeping with previous licensed incarnations of Superman characters (e.g. Superman had powers from infancy, Superman had an indestructible cape, and Lex Luthor referred to himself as a "criminal scientist") the series was notable for introducing Marv Wolfman's conception of Lex Luthor into animation. In the first episode, Luthor was portrayed as a billionaire possessing a ring fashioned with a kryptonite stone, which he used to keep Superman from apprehending him. Wolfman blended characteristics of his recent comic-book revamp of Luthor with Gene Hackman's portrayal of the character in live-action films.

Other characters included Cybron (a time traveling conqueror composed of energy) and an appearance by Wonder Woman, in her first non-print appearance since the final season of Super Friends. The Prankster, General Zod, Ursa, Faora, and an original incarnation of Shadow Thief also makes appearances.

Classic characters included Jimmy Olsen, bow-tied in appearance, and Perry White. Lois Lane maintained her identity as an assertive woman with initiative, both in style and business attitude, although her dress and hairstyle were more reflective of the 1980s. A new character to the series was Jessica Morganberry, inspired by Miss Tessmacher of the live-action Superman film from 1978, who appeared to be the ditzy blonde live-in girlfriend of Lex Luthor with whom he fully confided his schemes.

Superman/Clark Kent was voiced by Beau Weaver, who would later go on to voice Mister Fantastic in the 1994 Marvel animated series Fantastic Four.

=== The "Superman Family Album" ===
The final four minutes of each Superman episode were devoted to a brief snapshot from the "Superman Family Album". In addition to "super-baby" misadventures in the early episodes, the segments featured rites of passage such as Clark Kent's first day at school, an overnight scouting campout, getting a driver's license, his first date, graduation from high school, and ultimately his premiere as Superman. The initial idea for the segments was proposed by Judy Price, then head of the CBS Kids division.

== Episodes ==
No.	Title	Written by	Original release date
1	"Destroy the Defendroids" "The Adoption"	Marv Wolfman	September 17, 1988
Destroy the Defendroids: Lex Luthor's company makes robots called Defendroids that stop crooks and save people so effectively it causes Superman to move away from Metropolis. With his old rival gone, Luthor uses the Defendroids to rob a train transporting a billion dollars in gold to Fort Knox.; The Adoption: After Jonathan and Martha Kent discover Jor-El's spaceship on the roadside with his son, they take the baby to an orphanage. Unfortunately there are a number of couples waiting, but - to the Kents' luck - the baby uses his superpowers in mischievous ways, which repel the other couples ahead of them. He is ultimately adopted by the Kents, with whom he gets along.
2	"Fugitive from Space" "The Supermarket"	Martin Pasko Cherie Wilkerson	September 24, 1988
Fugitive from Space: When S.T.A.R. Labs discovers an alien spaceship which crashes, Lois Lane, Clark Kent, Jimmy Olsen, and S.T.A.R. Labs scientists Albert Michaels and Jenet Klyburn find within the ship two aliens named Xelandra and Argan in suspended animation until Jimmy accidentally awakens them. When it is discovered the ship was used by an intergalactic policeman who arrested a criminal, Superman must find out who is who before the criminal uses Earth to lay eggs.; The Supermarket: When Martha Kent takes Clark on his first shopping trip, she tries to be careful that Clark doesn't give away his powers.
3	"By the Skin of the Dragon's Teeth" "At the Babysitter's"	Karen Willson & Chris Weber Cherie Wilkerson	October 1, 1988
By the Skin of the Dragon's Teeth: Lex Luthor buys the Great Wall of China and invites Lois Lane, Clark Kent, and Jimmy Olsen over for an interview. When Lex Luthor accidentally brings the statue of the Dragon King to life, he and Superman must work together to stop the dragon statue.; At the Babysitter's: Jonathan and Martha Kent leave Clark with Melissa the babysitter. Clark figures he can use his powers to skip bedtime, but learns even Kryptonians get naturally tired.
4	"Cybron Strikes" "The First Day of School"	Buzz Dixon Cherie Wilkerson	October 8, 1988
Cybron Strikes: When Superman is celebrating Lois Lane's birthday with a fly through the skies, a metal pyramid floats down to them and they meet its pilot, a hostile cyborg named Cybron who comes from the 35th century. When Cybron's pyramid is brought to a government facility, Cybron breaks free and turns Lois, Jimmy, and a bunch of people into robots.; The First Day of School: Clark Kent goes to school for the first time and meets Lana Lang. During his time at school, he gets blamed for letting the class guinea pig out of its cage.; Note: Initially intended to be a story centered on Brainiac, due to the comic counterpart being "in flux" Post Crisis it was instead decided to create the original character of Cybron.
5	"The Big Scoop" "Overnight with the Scouts"	Michael Reaves Cherie Wilkerson	October 15, 1988
The Big Scoop: Clark Kent's old friend Dr. Glozer invents the Chronotron which allows the user to see into the future. Lex Luthor wants the device and sends his men to capture Dr. Glozer and steal the machine. Using it to win at horse racing, Luthor sees a crime at the track and realizes Clark Kent is Superman. Luthor then gets Clark on a tabloid TV show to force him to reveal himself.; Overnight with the Scouts: Clark Kent camps in the woods with his boy scout troop where they tell ghost stories.
6	"Triple Play" "The Circus"	Larry DiTillio Meg McLaughlin	October 22, 1988
Triple Play: Prankster seeks his revenge against those who sent him to prison. He ends up transporting the Metros and the Goliaths (two baseball teams competing in the World Series) to his uncharted island, kidnaps Judge Cook, Lois Lane, and Jimmy Olsen (who were partially responsible for the events that sent him to prison), and threatens their lives. Superman is the only one who can rescue his friends from the Prankster when he is forced to play as a pitcher for Prankster's Robot Baseball Team against the two baseball teams for Prankster's amusement.; The Circus: Clark Kent inadvertently becomes part of the circus.
7	"The Hunter" "Little Runaway"	Karen Willson & Chris Weber Cherie Wilkerson	October 29, 1988
The Hunter: While out on a holiday with his parents, Clark Kent ends up having to leave as Superman when General Zod and his companions Ursa and Faora arrive. They create a creature called the Hunter, which can transform into any material it acquires. Things get difficult for Superman when the Hunter acquires the kryptonite in Lex Luthor's possession.; Little Runaway: Clark is unhappy with his adoptive parents and decides to run away from him. He leaves but after a number of problems, he returns after he realizes that home is not worse than life on the run.
8	"Superman and Wonder Woman vs. The Sorceress of Time" "The Birthday Party"	Cherie Wilkerson & Marv Wolfman Cherie Wilkerson	November 5, 1988
Superman and Wonder Woman vs. The Sorceress of Time: When Superman stops a meteor, a piece of it falls to Themyscira and breaks the crystal prison containing the sorceress Syrene (who has the ability to transport mythological creatures to the present) where she turns the Amazons into hideous short creatures. Superman and Wonder Woman must stop Cyrene before she obtains the ultimate power sealed within Themyscira, which she needs Wonder Woman to open.; The Birthday Party: Clark Kent's birthday party gets a surprise.
9	"Bonechill" "The Driver's License"	Larry DiTillio Cherie Wilkerson	November 12, 1988
Bonechill: A bookstore owner named Chilton Bone uses a medallion called the Talisman of Olaf to become Bonechill, who has the ability to bring mummies and other horror monsters to life.; The Driver's License: Clark Kent takes his driving test.
10	"The Beast Beneath These Streets" "First Date"	Michael Reaves Cherie Wilkerson	November 19, 1988
The Beast Beneath These Streets: Researchers have discovered an old part of Metropolis that has been buried for a hundred years. According to legend, this part of Metropolis was buried a hundred years ago when a scientist named Dr. Morpheus made a machine that allowed him to steal the powers of a number of different kinds of animals. The legend turns out to be true when Dr. Morpheus (who appears to be a humanoid bat/rat hybrid with spider web-shooting abilities) kidnaps Lois Lane. He lures Superman to his machine in a plot to steal Superman's powers, and uses bats to help Superman get there. Lois is tied to a chair and gagged in a theater on the stage. Superman sees her with his X-ray vision and unties her. She ungags herself and reveals it is a trap too late, as Dr. Morpheus drains Superman's powers. He tries to take over Metropolis and throws Superman into an underground river, but he escapes and Kryptonite is used to weaken Dr. Morpheus and force him into the machine. Superman reverses the polarity and gets his powers back. He uses his heat vision to trap Dr. Morpheus in the machine until the police arrive.; First Date: Clark Kent takes Lana Lang on a date to a concert.
11	"Wildsharkk" "To Play or Not to Play"	Marv Wolfman & Cherie Wilkerson Cherie Wilkerson	November 26, 1988
Wildsharkk: In the Bermuda Triangle, Superman must do battle with a villain named Captain Wildsharkk who is hijacking ships.; To Play or Not to Play: Clark Kent discovers that he cannot play football since his powers give him an unfair advantage.
12	"Night of the Living Shadows" "Graduation"	Buzz Dixon Cherie Wilkerson	December 3, 1988
Night of the Living Shadows: Lex Luthor develops a suit that enables a person to become a living shadow. He gives it to a low-level thug from Suicide Slum named McFarlane to rob a bank (who gets dubbed Shadow Thief), then uses the suit himself to rob a jewelry store. Lex Luthor then recruits a gang to use the suits in a plan to rob the mint where their robberies baffle Superman and Inspector Henderson.; Graduation: Clark Kent must solve a problem with his graduation robe when it gets dirty on Graduation Day.
13	"The Last Time I Saw Earth" "It's Superman"	Steve Gerber Cherie Wilkerson	December 10, 1988
The Last Time I Saw Earth: An Okaaran bounty hunter named Starrok steals the shuttle that Lois Lane and Jimmy Olsen are in. He brings them to Okaara where they are fattened up in order to gain the proteins from their bodies to become immortal.; It's Superman: Upon moving to Metropolis, Clark Kent gets a job at the Daily Planet and then becomes Superman for the first time by saving Lois Lane when a bank is being robbed.

== Cast ==
- Beau Weaver – Clark Kent / Superman
- Ginny McSwain – Lois Lane, Ursa (in "The Hunter"), Faora (in "The Hunter")
- Michael Bell – Lex Luthor, Patron (in "Superman and Wonder Woman vs. the Sorceress of Time")
- Tress MacNeille – Martha Kent
- Alan Oppenheimer – Jonathan Kent
- Stanley Ralph Ross – Perry White, Starrok
- Lynne Marie Stewart – Jessica Morganberry, Young Clark Kent
- Mark Taylor – Jimmy Olsen
- Bill Woodson – Opening Narration

=== Additional voices ===
- Jack Angel – General Hawkins (in "Cybron Strikes")
- René Auberjonois – General Zod (in "The Hunter")
- Brandon Bluhm – Scout Kid (in "Overnight with the Scouts")
- Don Bovinglough – Coach (in "To Play or Not to Play")
- P.L. Brown – (in "Night of the Living Shadows")
- William Callaway – Defendroids (in "Destroy the Defendroids"), (in "The Last Time I Saw Earth")
- Joey Camen – Short Henchman (in "Triple-Play")
- Darleen Carr – (in "The Hunter")
- Pat Carroll – Queen Hippolyta (in "Superman and Wonder Woman vs. the Sorceress of Time")
- Nancy Cartwright – Melissa (in "At the Babysitter's")
- Cathy Cavadini – Barbara (in "Bonechill"), Co-Ed (in "The Driver's License"), Maria (in "The Driver's License")
- Townsend Coleman – Teenage Clark Kent, Ted Kline
- Christopher Collins – Minotaur (in "Superman and Wonder Woman vs. the Sorceress of Time"), Cyclops (in "Superman and Wonder Woman vs. the Sorceress of Time")
- Danny Cooksey – George (in "The First Day of School")
- Peter Cullen – The Hunter (in "The Hunter")
- Keene Curtis – Bonechill/Chilton Bone (in "Bonechill")
- Gabriel Damon – (in "Superman and Wonder Woman vs. the Sorceress of Time"), Jessik (in "The Last Time I Saw Earth")
- Victor DiMattia (in "The First Day At School" and "Overnight with the Scouts")
- Shawn Donahue –
- Jeff Doucette – Sideshow Barker (in "The Circus")
- Jeannie Elias – Mrs. Murphy (in "The Supermarket")
- Ron Feinberg – (in "Night of the Living Shadows", "The Last Time I Saw Earth")
- Ben Ryan Ganger – Scout Kid (in "Overnight with the Scouts")
- Linda Gary – Mrs. Lang (in "Graduation")
- Liz Georges – Teenage Lana Lang
- Ellen Gerstell – Madame Nikua (in "By the Skin of the Dragon's Teeth")
- Ed Gilbert – Shuttle Captain (in ""The Last Time I Saw Earth")
- Dan Gilvezan – Dr. Morpheus (in "The Beast Beneath These Streets")
- Barry Gordon – (in "The Driver's License")
- Patrick Gorman – Ship Computer (in "Fugitive from Space")
- Edan Gross – Scout Kid (in "Overnight with the Scouts")
- Kenneth Hartman –
- Darryl Hickman – (in "The Last Time I Saw Earth")
- Jerry Houser – (in "To Play or Not to Play")
- Dennis Howard – (in "Wildsharkk")
- Erv Immerman – (in "Night of the Living Shadows")
- Danny Mann – (in "Bonechill")
- Kellie Martin – Young Lana Lang (in "The Birthday Party")
- Ron Masak – (in "Wildsharkk")
- Mary McDonald-Lewis – Syrene(in "Superman and Wonder Woman vs. the Sorceress of Time")
- Cindy McGee – (in "Graduation")
- Howard Morris – Prankster / Oswald Loomis (in "Triple-Play")
- Ron Palillo – (in "Night of the Living Shadows")
- Diane Pershing – Anne White (in "Wildsharkk")
- Pat Pinney – Scout Leader (in "Overnight with the Scouts")
- Henry Polic II – Captain Wildsharkk (in "Wildsharkk")
- Hal Rayle – (in "The Big Scoop", "The Last Time I Saw Earth")
- Kathy Ritter – (in "Bonechill")
- Jennifer Roach –
- Stu Rosen – Catcher Henchman (in "Triple-Play")
- Neil Ross – S.T.A.R. Labs Security Guard (in "Fugitive from Space")
- Will Ryan – Conroy (in "The Adoption")
- Susan Silo – Jenet Klyburn (in "Fugitive from Space"), Xelandra (in "Fugitive from Space")
- John Stephenson – Driving Instructor (in "The Driver's License")
- Carl Steven –
- Andre Stojka – Professor Gerber (in "Bonechill"), Bowling Alley Manager (in "Bonechill")
- Cree Summer – Astronaut (in "The Last Time I Saw Earth")
- Eric Suter – (in "Bonechill")
- Russi Taylor – Young Lana Lang (in "The First Day of School")
- B.J. Ward – Wonder Woman(in "Superman and Wonder Woman vs. the Sorceress of Time")
- Frank Welker – Cybron (in "Cybron Strikes")
- Tom Williams – Judge Cook (in "Triple-Play")
- Stan Wojno – Fat Henchman (in "Triple-Play")
- Patric Zimmerman – (in "Bonechill")

== Crew ==
- Ginny McSwain – voice director
- Lynne Batchelor – talent coordinator

== Production ==
During the approach of Superman's 50th anniversary, CBS teamed with Ruby-Spears to produce a new animated series hoping to tap into the zeitgeist having already produced the television special Superman's 50th Anniversary. Marv Wolfman was hired as story editor for the series as CBS had responded favorably to a Superman parody he'd written for the Garbage Pail Kids animated series and were unaware that Wolfman had written for the actual Superman comics. Wolfman had no problem adhering to the expectations of DC Comics due to his experience writing the character, but would often receive notes from CBS executives that proved challenging to work with. Producer Joe Ruby stated that when it came to Superman's character, the show took inspiration from Christopher Reeve's portrayal from the film series as they liked the combination of a sense of humor while still being Superman. Lex Luthor was written as a mixture of Gene Hackman's take on the character from the Reeve films as Wolfman found him fun to write, but did incorporate the Post Crisis take on the character making him a wealthy business magnate rather than a mad scientist criminal mastermind as he was in the film series and Silver Age of Comic Books. As Wolfman was not a fan of the Post Crisis Lois Lane on Superman's relationship, he also reintroduced the classic love triangle aspect where Clark Kent loves Lois while she loves Superman unaware that the klutzy Kent is in fact him.

Wolfman and his staff attempted to build stories incorporating Mister Mxyzptlk and Bizarro, but ultimately scrapped them as they couldn't find a way to make them work. Wolfman stated that the decision to incorporate more original rather than adapted antagonists for the series came from Wolfman feeling that Superman in contrast to Batman didn't have as good of a rogues gallery.

Superman struggled in the ratings as, according to Wolfman, the person in charge of CBS' children's programming had a thinly veiled distaste for superhero shows and put the show early in the morning where it struggled to meet its targeted demographic of 9-13 year olds. Coupled with the high licensing fees the series was canceled by CBS after one season. The series featured the final work of Jack Kirby during his time at Ruby-Spears as he would lose his position in the company following the end of the series.

== Ties to other Superman adaptations ==
The series is also of note due to its use of re-orchestrated versions of John Williams' classic themes from 1978's Superman: The Movie, as well as an opening sequence that delivered the same narration as the 1950s Adventures of Superman television series (but by the narrator from Super Friends).

== Broadcast ==
The series was broadcast on CBS from September 17, 1988 through September 12, 1989 and was dropped from CBS' Saturday morning schedule the following season. The series was never rebroadcast in the United States past its initial run.

== Home media ==
Superman Ruby-Spears DVD cover

Warner Home Video, DC Comics and Warner Bros. Family Entertainment released the series as a 2-disc set on November 3, 2009.
