= Superman's 50th Anniversary =

- Written by: Adam Green; Bruce McCulloch; Rosie Shuster; Robert Smigel
- Directed by: Robert Boyd
- Presented by: Dana Carvey
- Music by: Hal Willner
- Country of origin: United States
- Original language: English

Production
- Producers: Lorne Michaels
- Running time: 60 minutes

Original release
- Network: CBS
- Release: February 29, 1988

Superman's 50th Anniversary: A Celebration of the Man of Steel is a 1988 American live action/animated television special made to celebrate the 50th Anniversary of Superman.

== Premise ==
Host Dana Carvey looks back over the history of Superman featuring sequences utilizing footage from the Max Fleischer Superman animated shorts, the Adventures of Superman starring George Reeves, and the Christopher Reeve Superman as well as vignettes wherein guest stars portraying various citizens of Metropolis give their two cents on Superman.

== Cast ==
=== Host ===
- Dana Carvey

=== Guests ===
- The Amazing Kreskin
- Tom Davis
- Al Franken
- Hal Holbrook
- Jan Hooks
- Jack Larson
- Noel Neill
- John Randolph
- Christopher Reeve
- Robert Vaughn
- Fred Willard

=== Sketch cast ===
- Fred Willard as Finn Howard
- John Randolph as Morton Simon
- Robert Vaughn as Ross Webster
- Jackson Beck as Announcer
- Marcia Gay Harden as Marcia Connolly
- Robert Smigel as Brainwave

== Production ==
With the approach of Superman's 50th Anniversary, CBS enlisted producer Saturday Night Live producer Lorne Michaels and staff writer Rosie Shuster (who by chance was a cousin of Superman co-creator Joe Shuster) to produce a prime TV special to mark the event. Later that same year, CBS would also air the Ruby-Spears produced Superman animated series

== Reception ==
In his review for The New York Times, John J. O'Connor praised Dana Carvey as the host as well as the history covered regarding Superman, but criticized the comedy sketches as "labored" and "uninspired". Conversely, Terry Atkinson praised the special in a review for the Los Angeles Times calling it "a delightful and frequently irreverent 60 minutes of nostalgia and nonsense."
