= Bradesco Seguros =

Brazilian insurance company

Bradesco Seguros S.A.
- Type: Subsidiary
- Industry: Financial services
- Founded: 1983
- Headquarters: São Paulo, Brazil
- Key people: Ivan Luiz Gontijo Júnior, (CEO)
- Products: Insurance; Life insurance Health insurance
- Revenue: ▲US$ 21.4 billion (2015)
- Net income: ▲US$ 1.8 billion (2018)
- Total assets: ▲US$ 58.8 billion (2017)
- Number of employees: 7,000
- Parent: Banco Bradesco
- Website: www.bradescoseguros.com.br

Bradesco Seguros, created in 1983 from the acquisition by Banco Bradesco bank of the company Atlântica Boavista de Seguros. It is the largest insurance company of Brazil and Latin America.The company is headquartered in Barueri, São Paulo.

The company operates in the automobile, health, life and patrimonial insurance and has 346 facilities and 34,000 active brokers, in addition to having a network of over 3,600 branches of Banco Bradesco to serve its customers.

== Companies owned by Bradesco Seguros ==
- Bradesco Vida e Previdência S.A
- Bradesco Saúde S.A
- Bradesco Capitalization S.A
- Bradesco Auto/RE Companhia de Seguros S.A
- BSP Real Estate Developments
- Bradesco Dental
- Multipensions
- Mediservice
