= The Adventures of Superpup =

- The full pilot
- Genre: Children's television series; Adventure; Superhero fiction
- Written by: Cal Howard; Whitney Ellsworth
- Directed by: Cal Howard
- Starring: Billy Curtis; Frank Delfino; Ruth Delfino; Sadie Delfino; Harry Monty; Angelo Rossitto
- Country of origin: United States
- No. of episodes: 1

Production
- Producer: Whitney Ellsworth
- Cinematography: Joseph F. Biroc
- Running time: 22 min.

The Adventures of Superpup is a 1958 unaired television pilot, intended to capitalize on the success of the Adventures of Superman series. Superpup depicted the characters from the Superman series as anthropomorphic dogs.

== Background ==
Following the success of the Adventures of Superman series, Whitney Ellsworth sought to create tie-in media to capitalize on the franchise. A pilot for the Adventures of Superpup was created in 1958, placing the Superman mythos into a fictional universe populated by anthropomorphic dogs instead of humans. The characters were portrayed by actors with dwarfism wearing dog masks and the pilot was shot on the same sets used in the Adventures of Superman. Each character is renamed with a dog-inspired pun; for example, Clark Kent is renamed to Bark Bent and Lois Lane is renamed to Pamela Poodle. The pilot also features a rodent puppet as the narrator.

An urban legend suggests that the pilot was created with the intention of replacing the Adventures of Superman series after the death of star George Reeves, although this is untrue, as Reeves died the year after the pilot was produced.

The pilot was failed to acquire a corporate sponsor and ultimately never aired. Clips from the pilot were first included in the 2006 documentary film Look, Up in the Sky: The Amazing Story of Superman, and the entire pilot was released as a bonus feature in the 2011 Superman Anthology Blu-ray set.

== Cast ==
- Billy Curtis as Bark Bent / Superpup
- Ruth Delfino as Pamela Poodle
- Angelo Rossitto as Terry Bite
- Frank Delfino as Sergeant Beagle
- Harry Monty as Professor Sheepdip
- Sadie Delfino as Sheepdip's dupe
