= Congorilla =

Fictional gorilla which appear in DC Comics and Vertigo Comics

- Congorilla as seen in the promotional art for Justice League: Cry for Justice by Mauro Cascioli.

Publication information
- Publisher: DC Comics
- First appearance: More Fun Comics #56 (June 1940)
- Created by: Whitney Ellsworth (writer); George Papp (artist)

In-story information
- Alter ego: William Glenmorgan
- Species: Human (formerly); Enchanted golden gorilla (currently)
- Team affiliations: Forgotten Heroes; Justice League
- Notable aliases: Congo Bill
- Abilities: Superhuman strength, stamina, durability, agility, reflexes, and senses; Healing factor; Size manipulation; Immortality

Congorilla (originally in human: William "Congo Bill" Glenmorgan) is a superhero appearing in comic books published by DC Comics and Vertigo Comics. Originally co-created by writer Whitney Ellsworth and artist George Papp. The character first appeared in More Fun Comics #56 (June 1940).

== Publication history ==
Congo Bill was a long-running DC Comics adventure comic strip, often reminiscent of Alex Raymond's Jungle Jim newspaper strip. Originating in More Fun Comics #56, the strip was a moderate success and ran there until issue #67 (May 1941), after which it moved to Action Comics from issue #37 (June 1941).

Action Comics #191 (April 1954) introduced Janu the Jungle Boy, a young boy brought up in the jungle after his father had been killed by a tiger. In 1954, DC gave Congo Bill a solo series, published on a bi-monthly schedule, which lasted for seven issues (August/September 1954 – August/September 1955).

Congo Bill encountered the legendary golden gorilla in Action Comics #224 (January 1957). He also encountered the similarly named Congorilla in Action Comics #228 (May 1957). In issue #248 (January 1959), Bill was transformed into Congorilla and the title of the strip was likewise changed. The Congorilla series ran in Action Comics until issue #261 (February 1960), after which it was transferred to Adventure Comics from issues #270 (March 1960) to #283 (April 1961).

Since the demise of his series, Congorilla has mainly been seen as a guest star in other titles, including as part of the Forgotten Heroes. The character received a mini-series of his own in 1992, where Janu betrays Bill, usurps the Congorilla identity, and partially blinds him. In 1999, DC Comics once again brought Congo Bill back for another four-issue limited series under the company's mature readership Vertigo Comics imprint.

Congorilla returned in the 2009 series Cry for Justice, joining a proactive splinter faction of the Justice League. Following that series, Congorilla became a main character in Justice League of America as a full-time member of the Justice League. He also starred in the Starman/Congorilla one-shot (March 2011) alongside close friend and teammate Starman (Mikaal Tomas).

Congo Bill appears in the Rebirth continuity as the warden of Monster Rock, where he trains the hero Damage in controlling his abilities.

== Fictional character biography ==
William "Congo Bill" Glenmorgan was born in 1898, the son of a Scottish gamekeeper. At one point he was a member of the IRA, and during World War I he served as soldier in the Battle of the Somme in France 1916 and also Battle of Flanders Field in Passendale, Belgium. He worked his way up as a spy in Austria. He later became a globe-trotting adventurer, and for a time worked for the Worldwide Insurance Company, protecting policies they had written and saving the company from fraudulent payouts.

Bill grew content to live in his adopted African home, swearing to protect it from harm. There he befriended a witch doctor known as Chief Kawolo. When Kawolo was mortally injured in a fall, he summoned Bill to his bedside and offered him a magic ring. Kawolo told the skeptical Congo Bill that, by rubbing the ring, he could transfer his consciousness into the body of the legendary golden gorilla. He accepted the ring to humor his friend's dying wish. Several weeks later, an earthquake trapped Bill in a deep cave. With no possible escape, Congo Bill hopelessly rubbed the magic ring. Instantly, his mind was transported into the body of the Golden Gorilla. Racing to the cave-in, he used his massive strength to clear the blocked entrance and wondering what had become of his body without him being "home". He realized that when his consciousness entered the body of the golden gorilla, the creature's consciousness entered his own body. Bill decides to use his new powers to fight crime in the jungle. He is later assisted by Janu, a young boy raised in the jungle.

Years later, Bill (now known as Congorilla) is trapped in his golden gorilla form due to the death of his human body. He becomes the protector of a band of gorillas as well as befriending the South African hero Freedom Beast. When the gorillas and Freedom Beast are slaughtered by hunters, Congorilla decides to seek justice. After the trail leads to the villain Prometheus, Congorilla works with Starman and a splinter faction of the Justice League. After Prometheus's death, Congorilla and his new best friend Starman become full-time members of the Justice League.

During his time with the League, Bill faces off against such foes as the rogue Starheart and Eclipso. He is also part of a much larger makeshift Justice League squad when the return of Batman from a seeming death threatens to destroy time and space. After Batman Inc. appoints the vigilante Batwing as the official Batman of Africa, Congorilla realizes that the continent is too big for one hero to handle. He ultimately chooses to resign from the JLA to organize the superheroes of Africa into a more efficient team and find a worthy successor for Freedom Beast.

In 2011, The New 52 rebooted the DC universe. Congorilla appears as a potential member of Justice League International.

In 2016, DC Comics implemented a relaunch of its books called "DC Rebirth" which restored its continuity to a form much as it was prior to "The New 52". In contrast to the original continuity, the relaunch restored both Congo Bill's human version and the original Golden Gorilla. This change restores Congo Bill's need for the magic ring. Congo Bill is named the warden of Monster Rock and is Damage's mentor.

== Powers and abilities ==
Before becoming Congorilla, Bill is a skilled hunter, explorer, and marksman. As Congorilla, Bill's simian body granted him supernatural strength, stamina, durability, agility, reflexes, and senses, self-healing capabilities, the ability to grow in size, and virtual immortality. In order to become Congorilla, he originally rubs a magic ring, which would swap his consciousness with that of the golden gorilla.

== Other versions ==
- An alternate universe version of Congorilla makes a cameo appearance in JLA: The Nail as a prisoner of Cadmus Labs.
- An alternate universe version of Congorilla appears in Flashpoint.
- An alternate timeline version of Congorilla appears in Twilight of the Superheroes. This version is a crime boss who remained in his gorilla body for decades after his human body became too fragile. Due to the gorilla's spirit proving immortal despite being in his body, Congorilla keeps him hidden in his apartment.

== In other media ==
=== Television ===
- William Glenmorgan appears in the Arrow episode "My Name Is Emiko Queen", portrayed by Edward Foy. This version is a human mercenary.
- Congorilla appears in the Creature Commandos episode "Chasing Squirrels", voiced by Jason Konopisos. This version is an inmate of Belle Reve Penitentiary who is later killed by the Bride.

=== Film ===
Congo Bill appears in a self-titled film serial, portrayed by Don McGuire.

=== Video games ===
Congorilla appears as a character summon in Scribblenauts Unmasked: A DC Comics Adventure.

=== Miscellaneous ===
Congorilla appears in issue #19 of the Young Justice tie-in comic book series. This version is a gorilla deity and member of Solovar's troop.
