= Harry Monty =

American actor

- Born: Hymie Lichtenstein; April 15, 1904; Dallas, Texas, U.S.
- Died: December 28, 1999 (aged 95); Beverly Hills, California, U.S.
- Occupation: Actor
- Years active: 1939–1981

Hymie Lichtenstein (April 15, 1904 – December 28, 1999), better known as Harry Monty, was a Polish-American actor, dwarf actor and stuntman, whose most notable role was as a Munchkin and a winged monkey in the Wizard of Oz.

== Early life ==
Monty was born April 15, 1904 in Dallas, Texas to Frank and Lydia Lichtenstein, who had immigrated from Poland in the 1890s. He had three brothers.

== Career ==
Monty began his career in vaudeville, and appeared in various films from the 1930s to the 1970s, often uncredited. He appeared in Wizard of Oz in 1939 as a Munchkin, and also as one of the Winged Monkeys. He later said he considered his role as a Munchkin to be the most important of all his roles on stage and film in his 50-year career. His other film roles were in movies including Hellzapoppin', The Court Jester, Planet of the Apes, Papillon, a production of Swiss Family Robinson, Three Ring Circus, Hello, Dolly!, and as a rotoscope reference actor in the 1978 animated film The Lord of the Rings.

He worked as a stunt double for many child actors, and did all of Margaret O'Brien's stunt work. In addition, Monty served as a stuntperson in the films Tarzan Finds a Son!, Bad Bascomb, River of No Return, and Earthquake.

Monty also appeared in the television series Lost in Space, Bonanza, Bewitched, and H.R. Pufnstuf.

== Death and burial ==
Monty died on December 28, 1999, at age of 95. After a private funeral service he was buried at Shearith Israel Memorial Park in Dallas.

== Filmography ==
- Wizard of Oz (1939) – Munchkin Soldier / Winged Monkey (uncredited)
- Hellzapoppin' (1941) – Midget Taxi Driver (uncredited)
- Ride 'Em Cowboy (1942) – Midget in Pool (uncredited)
- Tarzan's New York Adventure (1942) – Minor Role (uncredited)
- Ghost Catchers (1944) – Midget (uncredited)
- See My Lawyer (1945) – Strong Man / Chauffeur (uncredited)
- George White's Scandals (1945) – Box Gag (uncredited)
- An Angel Comes to Brooklyn (1945) – Midget Musician (uncredited)
- Anna and the King of Siam (1946) – Midget Page Boy (uncredited)
- Crack-Up (1946) – Midget in Arcade (uncredited)
- Alias the Champ (1949) – Giant Killer (uncredited)
- Invaders from Mars (1953) – Mutant (uncredited)
- River of No Return (1954) – Young Man (uncredited)
- 3 Ring Circus (1954) – Circus Midget Clown (uncredited)
- The Court Jester (1955) – One of Hermine's Midgets (uncredited)
- The Flying Fontaines (1959) – Clown (uncredited)
- Mysterious Island (1961) – (uncredited)
- How the West Was Won (1962) – Pirate (uncredited)
- The Brass Bottle (1964) – Midget Gong Man (uncredited)
- Our Man Flint (1966) – Minor Role (uncredited)
- Planet of the Apes (1968) – Child Ape (uncredited)
- Hello, Dolly! (1969) – Midget (uncredited)
- Papillon (1973) – (uncredited)
- The Lord of the Rings (1978) – (voice)
- Hometown U.S.A. (1979) – Bellhop
- Americathon (1979) – Act
