= Superman in film =

DC Comics superhero adaptations

Adaptations of Superman in other media
- Actors who have portrayed Superman: (first row) Kirk Alyn, George Reeves, Johnny Rockwell, (second row) Bob Holiday, Christopher Reeve, John Haymes Newton, (third row) Gerard Christopher, Ron Ely, Dean Cain, (fourth row)Tom Welling, Brandon Routh, Henry Cavill (fifth row) Tyler Hoechlin, Nicolas Cage, and David Corenswet
- Original source: Comics published by DC Comics
- First appearance: Action Comics #1 (April 1938)

Films and television
- Film(s): Superman (1948); Atom Man vs. Superman (1950); Superman and the Mole Men (1951); Superman (1978); Superman II (1980); Superman III (1983); Supergirl (1984); Superman IV: The Quest for Peace (1987); Superman Returns (2006); Superman II: The Richard Donner Cut (2006); Man of Steel (2013); Batman v Superman: Dawn of Justice (2016); Justice League (2017); Zack Snyder's Justice League (2021); Black Adam (2022); The Flash (2023); Superman (2025); Supergirl (2026); Man of Tomorrow (2027)

DC Comics' Superman, created by Jerry Siegel and Joe Shuster in June 1938, has featured in various films. He debuted in cinemas in a series of animated shorts beginning in 1941 and was the protagonist of two movie serials in 1948 and 1950. An independent studio, Lippert Pictures, released the first Superman feature film, Superman and the Mole Men, starring George Reeves, in 1951. In 1973, the film rights to the Superman character were purchased by Ilya Salkind, Alexander Salkind, and Pierre Spengler. After multiple scripts and several years in development, Richard Donner was hired as director, and he shot two films, Superman (1978) (marketed as Superman: The Movie), and Superman II (1980), at the same time, both starring Christopher Reeve. Donner had filmed 75 percent of Superman II before it was decided to suspend shooting on the first film. The Salkinds fired Donner after Superman was released and commissioned Richard Lester as the director to finish Superman II. Lester returned to direct Superman III (1983). The Salkinds also produced the spin-off Supergirl (1984). They then sold the rights to Cannon Films, which produced the poorly reviewed Superman IV: The Quest for Peace (1987). Ilya Salkind commissioned a fifth Superman script before Warner Bros. acquired the rights in 1993.

Over the course of 11 years, Warner Bros. developed and canceled three projects: Tim Burton's Superman Lives, which would have starred Nicolas Cage; Wolfgang Petersen's Batman vs. Superman; and the J. J. Abrams-scripted Superman: Flyby which went between directors Joseph "McG" Nichols and Brett Ratner. In 2004, the studio hired Bryan Singer and released Superman Returns in 2006, starring Brandon Routh. Donner's director's cut for Superman II was also released that year. Despite positive reviews, Warner Bros. was disappointed with the financial performance of Superman Returns and canceled a sequel, which would have been released in 2009. The studio nearly started production of a Justice League film with George Miller directing and D. J. Cotrona as Superman for a 2009 release, but it was shelved in 2008.

The film series was rebooted in 2013 with Man of Steel, directed by Zack Snyder with Henry Cavill starring as Superman. Man of Steel launched what became known as the DC Extended Universe (DCEU). Cavill next appeared as Superman in the DCEU films Batman v Superman: Dawn of Justice (2016) and Justice League (2017) (both again directed by Snyder), and in the director's cut of Justice League, Zack Snyder's Justice League (2021); he then made a cameo appearance in the mid-credits scene of Black Adam (2022). The Flash (2023) featured Superman cameos portrayed by Henry Cavill, Nicolas Cage, George Reeves, and Christopher Reeve. Sasha Calle, along with Helen Slater, appeared as Supergirl in the film.

The series was once again rebooted with Superman (2025), with David Corenswet as Superman. The film was written and directed by James Gunn and is the first film of the DC Universe (DCU). Milly Alcock portrayed Supergirl in the film, and reprised the role in Supergirl (2026).

== List of films ==
Film	U.S. release date	Director	Lead	Story by	Screenplay by	Produced by	Music by	Distributor
Early films
Superman serial	January 5, 1948	Spencer Gordon Bennet and Thomas Carr	Kirk Alyn	Lewis Clay, Royal K. Cole, Arthur Hoerl, George H. Plympton and Joseph F. Poland		Sam Katzman	Mischa Bakaleinikoff	Columbia Pictures
Atom Man vs. Superman serial	July 20, 1950	Spencer Gordon Bennet	Kirk Alyn	David Mathews, George H. Plympton, and Joseph F. Poland	David Mathews, George H. Plympton, and Joseph F. Poland	Sam Katzman	Mischa Bakaleinikoff	Columbia Pictures
Superman and the Mole Men	November 6, 1951	Lee Sholem	George Reeves	Robert J. Maxwell and Whitney Ellsworth (collectively credited under the pseudonym "Richard Fielding")		Barney A. Sarecky	Darrell Calker	Lippert Pictures
1978–2006 film series
Superman	December 15, 1978	Richard Donner	Christopher Reeve	Mario Puzo	Mario Puzo, David Newman, Leslie Newman and Robert Benton	Pierre Spengler	John Williams	Warner Bros. (US); Columbia-EMI-Warner Distributors (UK)
Superman II	June 19, 1981	Richard Donner and Richard Lester	Christopher Reeve	Mario Puzo	Mario Puzo, David Newman, and Leslie Newman	Pierre Spengler	Ken Thorne	Warner Bros. (US); Columbia-EMI-Warner Distributors (UK)
Superman III	June 17, 1983	Richard Lester	Christopher Reeve	David Newman and Leslie Newman	David Newman and Leslie Newman	Ilya Salkind and Pierre Spengler	Ken Thorne	Warner Bros. (US); Columbia-EMI-Warner Distributors (UK)
Supergirl	November 21, 1984	Jeannot Szwarc	Helen Slater	David Odell	David Odell	Timothy Burrill	Jerry Goldsmith	Tri-Star Pictures (US); Columbia-EMI-Warner Distributors (UK)
Superman IV: The Quest for Peace	July 24, 1987	Sidney J. Furie	Christopher Reeve	Lawrence Konner, Mark Rosenthal and Christopher Reeve	Lawrence Konner and Mark Rosenthal	Menahem Golan and Yoram Globus	John Williams; Alexander Courage	Warner Bros. (US); Columbia-Cannon-Warner Distributors (UK)
Superman Returns	June 28, 2006	Bryan Singer	Brandon Routh	Michael Dougherty, Dan Harris and Bryan Singer	Michael Dougherty and Dan Harris	Jon Peters, Bryan Singer and Gilbert Adler	John Ottman	Warner Bros.
Superman II: The Richard Donner Cut	November 28, 2006	Richard Donner	Christopher Reeve	Mario Puzo, David Newman, and Leslie Newman	Mario Puzo	Pierre Spengler	John Williams	Warner Bros.
DC Extended Universe films
Man of Steel	June 14, 2013	Zack Snyder	Henry Cavill	David S. Goyer and Christopher Nolan	David S. Goyer	Christopher Nolan, Charles Roven, Emma Thomas and Deborah Snyder	Hans Zimmer	Warner Bros.
Batman v Superman: Dawn of Justice	March 25, 2016	Zack Snyder	Henry Cavill	Chris Terrio and David S. Goyer	Chris Terrio and David S. Goyer	Charles Roven and Deborah Snyder	Hans Zimmer; Junkie XL	Warner Bros.
Justice League	November 17, 2017	Zack Snyder and Joss Whedon (Note: Snyder was the director during principal photography, but was replaced by Joss Whedon during post-production. Snyder retained directorial credit for the finished film, though reports have indicated Whedon reshot a majority of the film. Consequently, Snyder released a director's cut in 2021.)	Henry Cavill	Zack Snyder & Chris Terrio	Chris Terrio and Joss Whedon	Charles Roven, Deborah Snyder, Jon Berg, and Geoff Johns	Danny Elfman	Warner Bros.
Zack Snyder's Justice League	March 18, 2021	Zack Snyder	Henry Cavill	Zack Snyder, Chris Terrio and Will Beall	Chris Terrio	Charles Roven and Deborah Snyder	Junkie XL	HBO Max
DC Universe films
Superman	July 11, 2025	James Gunn	David Corenswet	James Gunn	James Gunn	James Gunn and Peter Safran	John Murphy; David Fleming	Warner Bros.
Supergirl	June 26, 2026	Craig Gillespie	Milly Alcock	Ana Nogueira	Ana Nogueira	James Gunn and Peter Safran	Claudia Sarne	Warner Bros.
Man of Tomorrow	July 9, 2027	James Gunn	David Corenswet	James Gunn	James Gunn	James Gunn and Peter Safran	David Fleming	Warner Bros.

=== Direct-to-video, cameos, and others ===
- 1954: Stamp Day for Superman — a short film produced for the U.S. Treasury to promote "Stamp Day", featuring George Reeves as Superman and Noel Neill as Lois Lane.
- 1992: Tiny Toon Adventures: How I Spent My Vacation – direct-to-video, featuring Jonathan Winters as Superman.
- 2006: Superman II: The Richard Donner Cut — the director's cut of Superman II, featuring around 80% new footage originally shot by director Richard Donner, including material featuring Marlon Brando.
- 2006: Superman: Brainiac Attacks — direct-to-video film utilizing character designs from Superman: The Animated Series; starring Tim Daly and Dana Delany.
- 2017: DC Super Heroes vs. Eagle Talon — animated film in which Superman is voiced by Kenichi Suzumura.
- 2018: Teen Titans Go! To the Movies — animated film in which Superman is voiced by Nicolas Cage.
- 2019: Shazam! — part of the DC Extended Universe in which Superman cameos, portrayed using Ryan Hadley as a stand-in for Henry Cavill. Superman was also seen controlling a crowd of fans who wanted to have their pictures taken with Aquaman and arm-wrestling with Shazam in the film's animated end credits sequence.
- 2020: Superman: Red Son, where he lands in Ukraine and accepts Soviet values.
- 2022: DC League of Super-Pets — animated film in which Superman is voiced by John Krasinski.
- 2022: Batman and Superman: Battle of the Super Sons – direct-to-video film in which Superman is voiced by Travis Willingham.
- 2022: Black Adam — part of the DC Extended Universe in which Superman cameos, played by Henry Cavill.
- 2023: The Flash — Superman cameos are portrayed by Henry Cavill, Nicolas Cage, Christopher Reeve, and George Reeves. Sasha Calle stars as Supergirl along with a cameo by Helen Slater.

==== Lego DC Comics films ====
- 2013: Lego Batman: The Movie - DC Super Heroes Unite — Superman is voiced by Travis Willingham.
- 2014: The Lego Movie — Superman appears brieftly, voiced by Channing Tatum.
- 2014: Lego DC Comics Super Heroes: Batman Be-Leaguered — TV special featuring Nolan North as Superman.
- 2015: Lego DC Comics Super Heroes: Justice League vs. Bizarro League — direct-to-video with Superman voiced by Nolan North.
- 2015: Lego DC Comics Super Heroes: Justice League: Attack of the Legion of Doom — direct-to-video with Nolan North reprising his role as Superman.
- 2016: Lego DC Comics Super Heroes: Justice League: Cosmic Clash – direct-to-video with Nolan North reprising his role.
- 2017: The Lego Batman Movie — animated film featuring Superman with Channing Tatum reprising his role.
- 2019: The Lego Movie 2: The Second Part — animated film featuring Superman with Channing Tatum reprising his role.

==== Unofficial adaptations and parodies ====
- 1960: Return of Mr. Superman — Indian Hindi-language retelling of Superman, with the title role played by Paidi Jairaj.
- 1979: The Return of Superman (Turkish: Süpermen Dönüyor; also known as "Turkish Superman") — a Turkish adaptation directed by Kunt Tulgar and starring Tayfun Demir as Superman.
- 1980: Superman — Indian Telugu-language film starring N. T. Rama Rao as Superman.
- 1987: Superman — Indian Hindi-language film with Puneet Issar as Superman.
- 2011: The Death and Return of Superman — short film released on YouTube by writer Max Landis.

==== Animated Original Movies universe ====
The DC Universe Animated Original Movies is a direct-to-video animated film series that often features Superman in a leading or supporting role.

DC Universe Animated Original Movies
Title	Release date	Voice actor	Notes
2007	Superman: Doomsday	Adam Baldwin	Based on "The Death of Superman".
2008	Justice League: The New Frontier	Kyle MacLachlan	Based on DC: The New Frontier by Darwyn Cooke.
2009	Superman/Batman: Public Enemies	Tim Daly	Based on "Superman/Batman: Public Enemies" by Jeph Loeb and Ed McGuinness.
2010	Justice League: Crisis on Two Earths	Mark Harmon	Based on JLA: Earth 2 by Grant Morrison and Frank Quitely.
2010	Superman/Batman: Apocalypse	Tim Daly	Based on "Superman/Batman: The Supergirl from Krypton" by Jeph Loeb and Michael Turner.
2010	Superman/Shazam!: The Return of Black Adam	George Newbern	Short film
2011	All-Star Superman	James Denton	Based on All-Star Superman by Grant Morrison and Frank Quitely.
2012	Justice League: Doom	Tim Daly	Based on "JLA: Tower of Babel" by Mark Waid.
2012	Superman vs. The Elite	George Newbern	Based on "What's So Funny About Truth, Justice & the American Way?" by Joe Kelly.
2013	Batman: The Dark Knight Returns (Part 2)	Mark Valley	Superman only appears in the second part of this two-part adaptation of the eponymous graphic novel by Frank Miller.
2013	Superman: Unbound	Matt Bomer	Based on "Brainiac" by Geoff Johns and Gary Frank.
2013	Justice League: The Flashpoint Paradox	Sam Daly	Based on "Flashpoint" by Geoff Johns and Andy Kubert.
2014	JLA Adventures: Trapped in Time	Peter Jessop	
2014	Justice League: War	Alan Tudyk	Based on "Justice League: Origin" by Geoff Johns and Jim Lee.
2015	Justice League: Throne of Atlantis	Jerry O'Connell	Based on "Throne of Atlantis" by Geoff Johns.
2015	Justice League: Gods and Monsters	Benjamin Bratt	Features a reimagined version of Superman who is the son of General Zod.
2015	Justice League vs. Teen Titans	Jerry O'Connell	
2017	Justice League Dark	Jerry O'Connell	
2018	The Death of Superman	Jerry O'Connell	Based on "The Death of Superman".
2019	Reign of the Supermen	Jerry O'Connell	Based on "Reign of the Supermen".
2019	Batman: Hush	Jerry O'Connell	Based on "Batman: Hush" by Jeph Loeb and Jim Lee.
2019	Justice League vs. the Fatal Five	George Newbern	
2020	Superman: Red Son	Jason Isaacs	Based on Superman: Red Son by Mark Millar.
2020	Justice League Dark: Apokolips War	Jerry O'Connell	
2020	Superman: Man of Tomorrow	Darren Criss	
2021	Justice Society: World War II	Darren Criss	Criss portrays the same character from Superman: Man of Tomorrow and a parallel reality version nicknamed 'Shakespeare'.
2021	Injustice	Justin Hartley	Hartley also portrays the Earth-1 version of the character. Based on the 2013 video game Injustice: Gods Among Us.
2022	Batman and Superman: Battle of the Super Sons	Travis Willingham	
2023	Legion of Super Heroes	Darren Criss	
2023	Justice League: Warworld	Darren Criss	
2024	Justice League: Crisis on Infinite Earths	Darren Criss	Criss also portrays the Earth-2 version of the character. Based on Crisis on Infinite Earths by Marv Wolfman and George Pérez.

== Pre-Donner films (1941–1951) ==
=== Superman (1941–1943) ===
Superman first appeared in cinemas in a 17-part series of theatrical animated shorts, between 1941 and 1943. They were released by Paramount Pictures. Of those 17 shorts, 9 were produced by Fleischer Studios, and the remaining 8 by its successor, Famous Studios. Superman was voiced by Bud Collyer (who also played Superman on The Adventures of Superman radio series) for the Fleischer-produced shorts and Lee Royce for the Famous-produced shorts.

#	Title	Original release date
Fleischer Studios
1.	Superman	September 26, 1941
2.	The Mechanical Monsters	November 28, 1941
3.	Billion Dollar Limited	January 9, 1942
4.	The Arctic Giant	February 27, 1942
5.	The Bulleteers	March 27, 1942
6.	The Magnetic Telescope	April 24, 1942
7.	Electric Earthquake	May 15, 1942
8.	Volcano	July 10, 1942
9.	Terror on the Midway	August 28, 1942
Famous Studios
10.	Japoteurs	September 18, 1942
11.	Showdown	October 16, 1942
12.	Eleventh Hour	November 20, 1942
13.	Destruction, Inc.	December 25, 1942
14.	The Mummy Strikes	February 19, 1943
15.	Jungle Drums	March 26, 1943
16.	The Underground World	June 18, 1943
17.	Secret Agent	July 30, 1943

=== Kirk Alyn serials ===
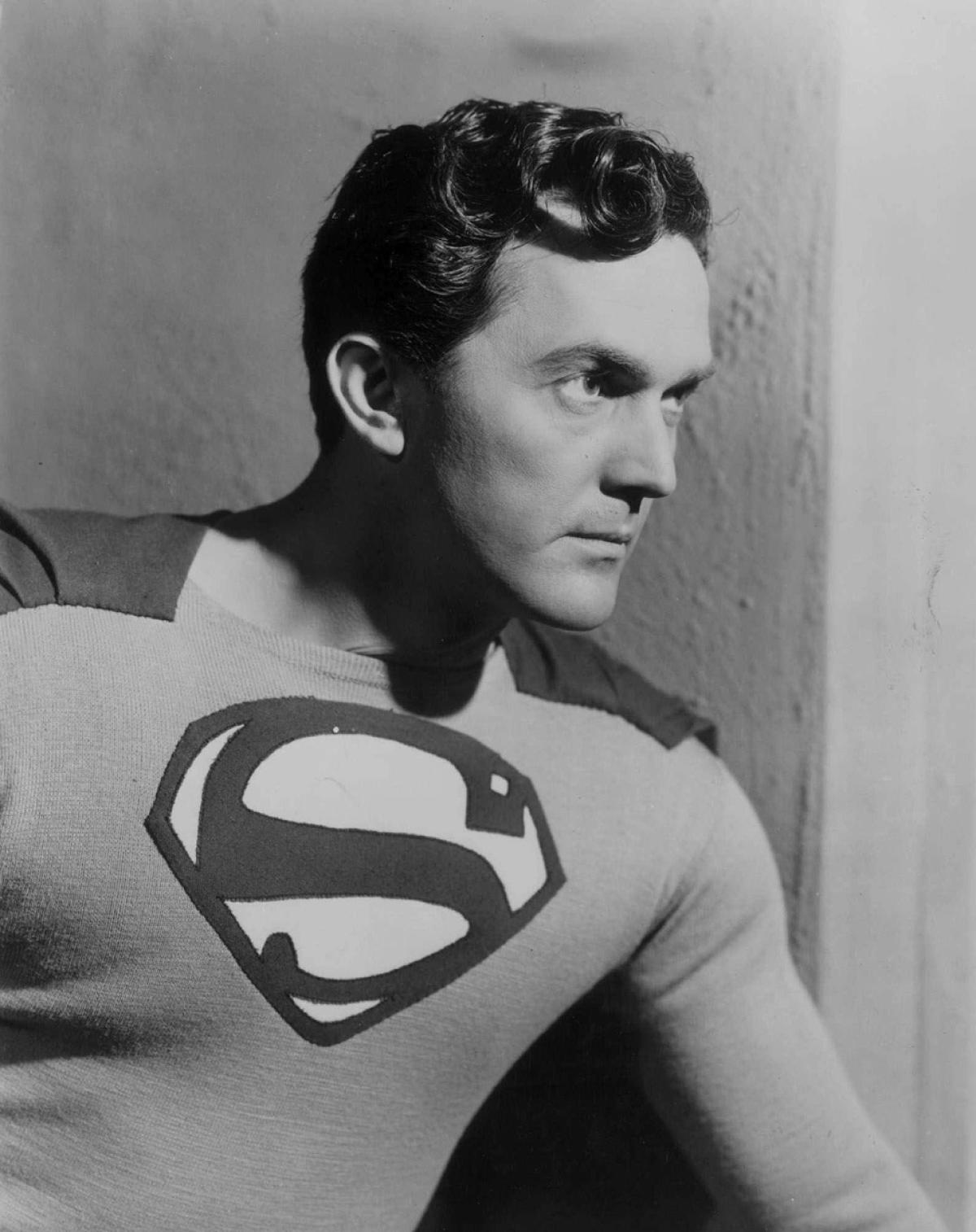
Kirk Alyn as Superman in a publicity still (1948).

==== Superman (1948) ====
The first appearance of Superman in live-action film was in Superman (1948), a 15-part film serial from Columbia Pictures, starring Kirk Alyn as the titular character (uncredited), Noel Neill as Lois Lane, and Tommy Bond as Jimmy Olsen.

==== Atom Man vs. Superman (1950) ====
The 1948 Superman was followed up by Atom Man vs. Superman, another 15-part serial from Columbia Pictures, the first installment of which was released in 1950. The serial featured the same main cast, including Kirk Alyn as Superman, with the addition of Lyle Talbot as Lex Luthor, also known as the "Atom Man".

=== Superman and the Mole Men (1951) ===
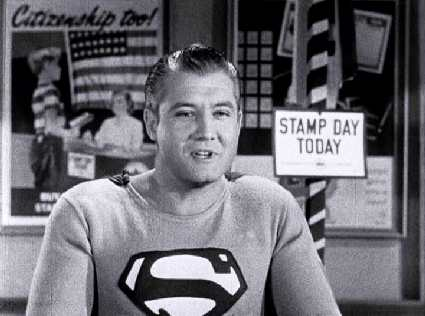
George Reeves as Superman in Stamp Day for Superman (1954).

Shot on a low budget, Lee Sholem's Superman and the Mole Men (1951) served as a trial run for the syndicated TV series Adventures of Superman (airing 1952–58), for which the 1951 film became a two-part pilot episode titled "The Unknown People".

Both the film and the subsequent TV series starred George Reeves as Superman. Lois Lane, on the other hand, was played by Phyllis Coates in the film and the first season of the show, but was recast in later seasons with Noel Neill (who also played the character in the previous Kirk Alyn films). The film was produced by Barney Sarecky with the original screenplay by Richard Fielding (a pseudonym for Robert Maxwell and Whitney Ellsworth).

In 1954, the short film Stamp Day for Superman was produced for the U.S. Treasury to promote "Stamp Day", featuring Reeves and Neill.

== Salkind/Cannon film series (1978–1987) ==
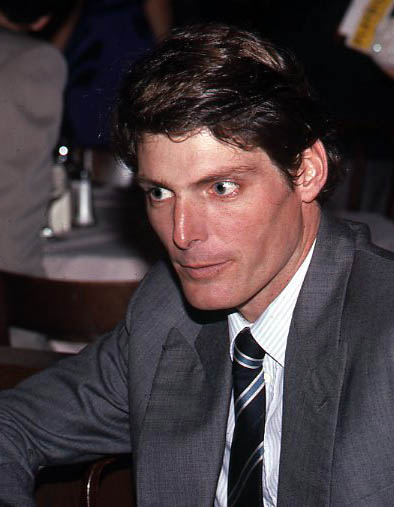
Christopher Reeve in 1985

In 1973, producer Ilya Salkind convinced his father Alexander to buy the film rights to Superman. They hired Mario Puzo to pen a two-film script and negotiated with Steven Spielberg to direct, though Alexander eventually landed on Richard Donner. Superman (1978) and Superman II (1980) were shot simultaneously.

=== Superman (1978) ===
Guy Hamilton was hired to direct, with Marlon Brando and Gene Hackman signing on to play Jor-El and Lex Luthor, respectively. With pre-production taking place in Rome, complications arose when it was discovered that Brando could not film in Italy as he faced an obscenity lawsuit over Last Tango in Paris (1972). As a result, production would subsequently move to England in late 1976, but Hamilton was unable to shoot in England as he had violated his tax payments. To replace Hamilton, the Salkinds hired Richard Donner, who in turn brought on Tom Mankiewicz to polish the script, giving it a serious feel with Christ-like overtones.

There was a lengthy search for a lead, and a number of famous figures turned down the role, including Robert Redford and Burt Reynolds. Eventually, Christopher Reeve was cast and underwent an exercise regimen to bulk up, gaining 24 pounds (11 kg) before filming. Margot Kidder was cast as Lois Lane.

With a budget of US$55 million, the 1978 Superman was the most expensive film made up to that point. It was a success both critically and commercially.

=== Superman II (1980) ===
Despite the success of 1978's Superman, director Richard Donner did not return to finish its sequel. Evidently, production of both films was marred by Donner's bad relationship with the Salkinds, for which Richard Lester acted as mediator.

With the film going over budget, the filmmakers decided to temporarily cease production of Superman II altogether, moving its climax into the first film. Eventually, it was completed with Lester, who gave it a more tongue-in-cheek tone relative to the first film. Nonetheless, Superman II was another financial and critical success, despite stiff competition with Raiders of the Lost Ark the same year.

In 2006, after many requests for his own version of Superman II, Donner and producer Michael Thau produced their own cut and released it on November 28 that year. The Donner Cut received positive response from critics as well as from the stars of the original film; according to the studio, the cut made Donner "the first director in history to be able to complete a film he left during production with nearly all his footage in the can".

=== Superman III (1983) ===
For the third installment, Ilya Salkind wrote a treatment that expanded the film's scope to a cosmic scale, introducing villains Brainiac and Mister Mxyzptlk, as well as Supergirl. Warner Bros., however, rejected and retooled the script into their own film, trimming Brainiac down into the film's evil "ultimate computer". The final product co-starred comedian Richard Pryor as computer genius Gus Gorman, who is manipulated into making fake Kryptonite that corrupts Superman.

Despite its success, fans were disappointed, in particular with Pryor's performance diluting the serious tone of the previous films, as well as controversy over the depiction of the evil Superman. Salkind's rejected proposal was eventually released online in 2007.

=== Supergirl (1984) ===
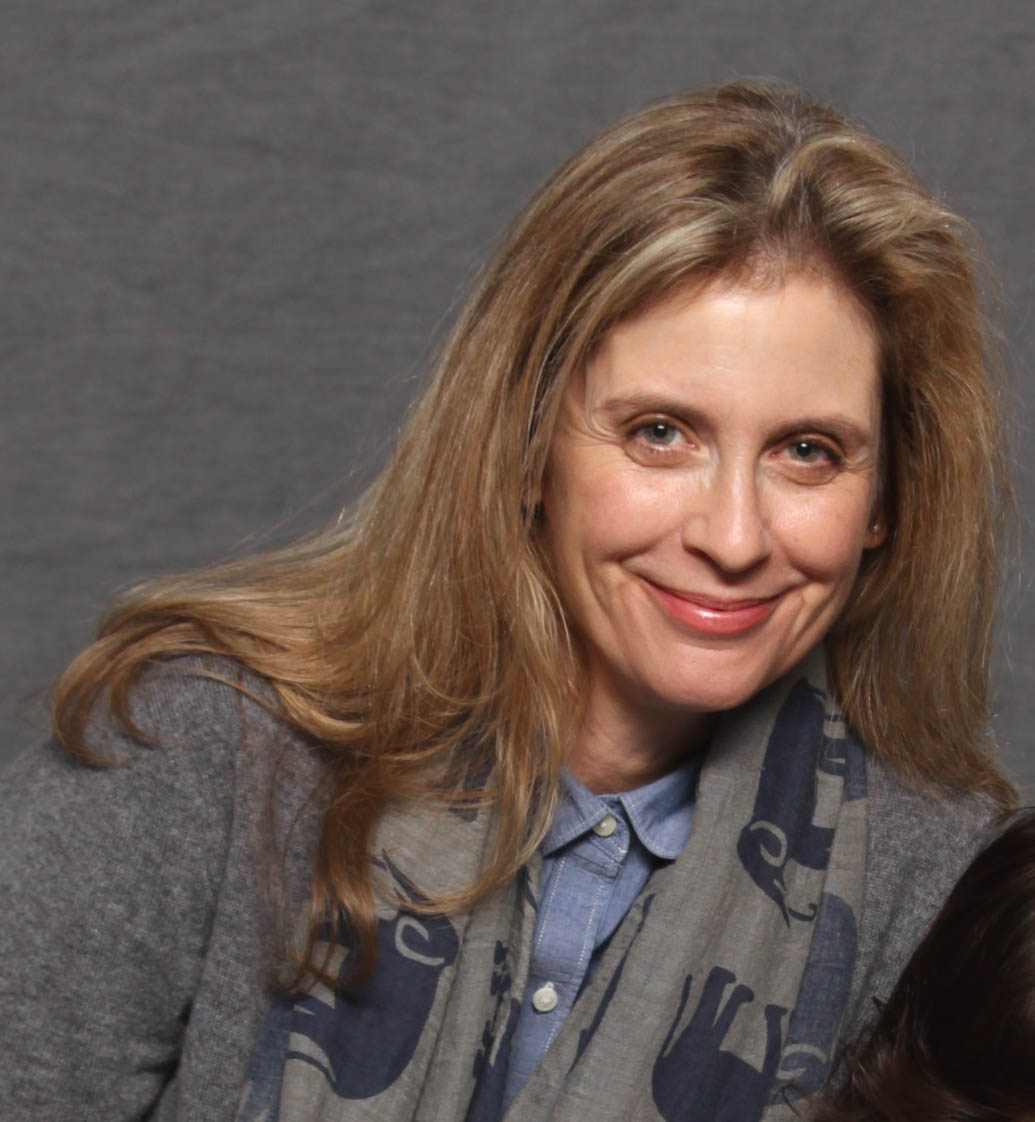
Slater at Florida Supercon in 2016.

Along with gaining the film rights to Superman, Alexander and Ilya Salkind also purchased the rights to the character of Superman's cousin, Supergirl.

Supergirl was released in 1984 as a spin-off of the Reeve films; Reeve was slated to have a cameo, but he ultimately backed out, though his likeness appears in a photo. It stars Helen Slater in her first motion picture in the title role, with Faye Dunaway (who received top billing) playing the primary villain, Selena, along with Marc McClure reprising his role as Jimmy Olsen.

Although the film received mostly negative reviews from critics and fared poorly at the box office, Slater was nominated for a Saturn Award for her performance.

=== Superman IV: The Quest for Peace (1987) ===
Cannon Films picked up an option for a fourth film, directed by Sidney J. Furie, with Reeve reprising the role due to his interest in the film's topic regarding nuclear weapons. Several others reprised their roles as well, including Kidder (Lois Lane) and Hackman (Lex Luthor). Cannon decided to cut the budget, resulting in poor special effects and heavy re-editing, which contributed to the film's poor reception.

Although the film was a minor financial success, Warner Bros. decided to end the series, following the mixed to negative reception of the last two films.

== Superman Returns (2006) ==
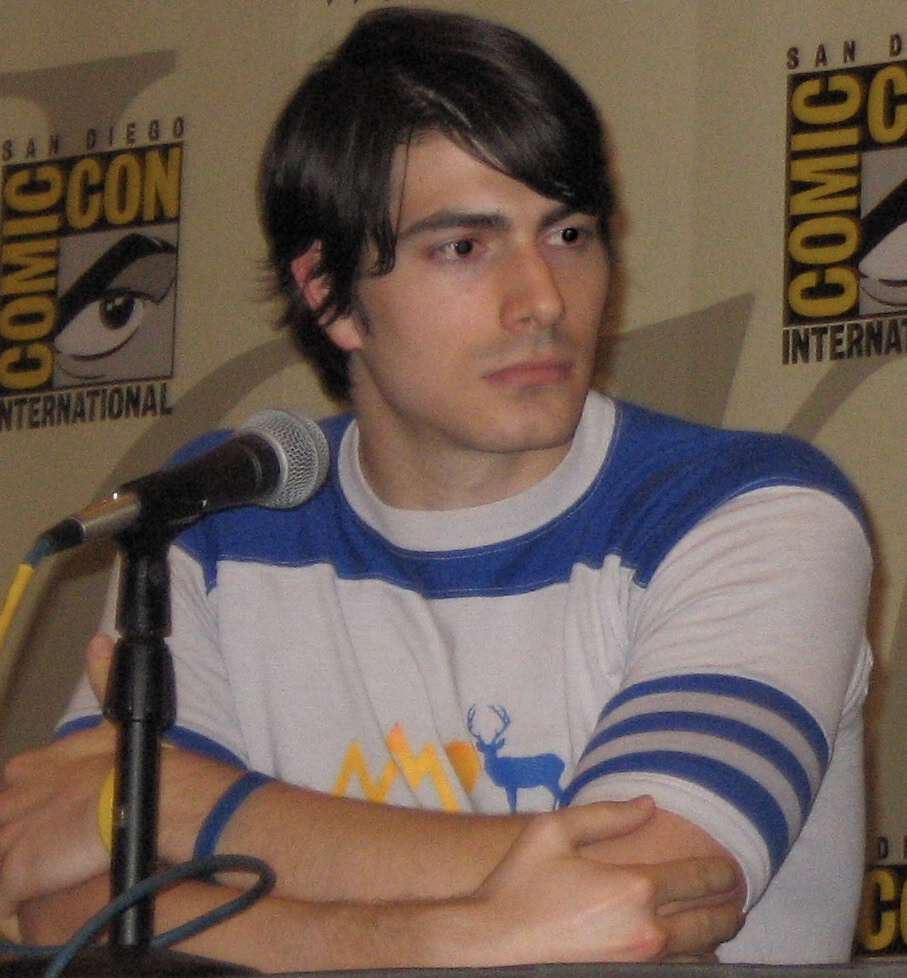
Brandon Routh in 2006

Following several unsuccessful attempts to reboot the franchise, Bryan Singer, who was said to be a childhood fan of the 1978 film, was approached by Warner Bros. to direct a new Superman film. He accepted, abandoning two films already in pre-production, X-Men: The Last Stand (which would come to be directed by Brett Ratner) and a remake of Logan's Run. To work on the film, Singer brought his entire crew from X2.

For the lead role, Brandon Routh was chosen in part because he resembled Christopher Reeve; in fact, Routh had been signed by his manager several years earlier due to this resemblance. Singer followed Richard Donner's lead in casting a relatively unknown actor as the titular character and more high-profile actors in supporting roles, such as Kevin Spacey as Lex Luthor. Through digitally-enhanced archive footage, Marlon Brando, who had died in 2004, appears in the film as Jor-El.

As backstory, the film uses the events of the 1978 film and Superman II, while ignoring the events of Superman III and Superman IV: The Quest for Peace and its spin-off Supergirl. Singer's story tells of Superman's return to Earth following a 5-year search for survivors of Krypton. He discovers that, in his absence, Lois Lane has given birth to a son and become engaged.

Superman Returns received positive reviews and grossed approximately US$391 million worldwide.

== DC Extended Universe (2013–2023) ==
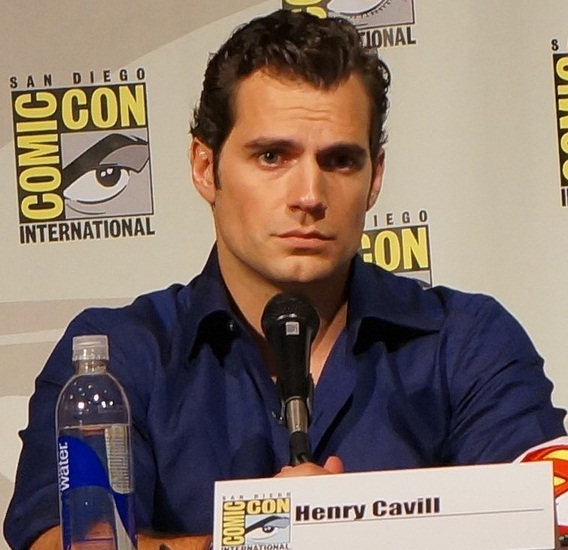
Henry Cavill in 2013

=== Man of Steel (2013) ===
In June 2008, Warner Bros. took pitches from comic book writers, screenwriters, and directors on how to restart the Superman film series. During story discussions for The Dark Knight Rises in 2008, David S. Goyer, aware that Warner Bros. was planning a Superman reboot, told Christopher Nolan his idea on how to present Superman in a modern context. Impressed with Goyer's concept, Nolan pitched the idea to the studio in February 2010, who hired Nolan to produce and Goyer to write based on the financial and critical success of The Dark Knight. Nolan admired Singer's work on Superman Returns for its connection to Richard Donner's version, and previously used the 1978 film as casting inspiration for Batman Begins. Zack Snyder was hired as the film's director in October. Principal photography started in August 2011 in West Chicago, Illinois, before moving to Vancouver and Plano, Illinois. The film stars Henry Cavill as Kal-El / Clark Kent / Superman, Amy Adams as Lois Lane, Michael Shannon as General Zod, Diane Lane as Martha Kent, Kevin Costner as Jonathan Kent, Laurence Fishburne as Perry White, and Russell Crowe as Jor-El. The film was released in June 2013.

=== Batman v Superman: Dawn of Justice (2016) ===
David S. Goyer and Zack Snyder respectively wrote and directed Batman v Superman: Dawn of Justice (2016), a follow-up to Man of Steel and the second film in the DC Extended Universe. Christopher Nolan returned as producer, albeit in a lesser role than he had in the first film. Goyer stated at the Superman 75th Anniversary Panel at the 2013 San Diego Comic-Con that Batman and Superman would battle, and titles under consideration were Superman Vs Batman and Batman Vs Superman. Over the next six months, Ben Affleck (as Batman), Gal Gadot (as Wonder Woman), Jesse Eisenberg (as Lex Luthor) and Jeremy Irons (as Alfred Pennyworth) were added to the cast. All have since appeared in other DCEU films as well.

The film was released on March 25, 2016; initially was slated to July 2015, but was delayed to give the filmmakers "time to realize fully their vision, given the complex visual nature of the story".

=== Justice League (2017) ===
Shortly after filming had finished for Man of Steel, Warner Bros hired Will Beall to script a new Justice League film in June 2012. With the release of Man of Steel in June 2013, Goyer was hired to write a new Justice League script, with the Beall draft being scrapped. Zack Snyder was hired to direct Goyer's Justice League script. Warner Bros. was reportedly courting Chris Terrio to rewrite Justice League, after having been impressed with his rewrite of Batman v Superman. During post-production of the film, Zack Snyder left the film due to the death of his daughter. Joss Whedon took over the project and wrote and directed reshoots.

=== Zack Snyder's Justice League (2021) ===
The divisive reaction toward the theatrical cut of Justice League, with Zack Snyder leaving directorial duties and the theatrical cut of the film in the hands of Joss Whedon, led to an argument comparing the situation to the one experienced by the film Superman II. Both Justice League and Superman II had a director who was replaced before the completion of the film (for different reasons), which led to a second director coming in and making substantial changes to the tone of the film. Richard Donner was able to complete his cut of Superman II in 2005. In the belief that Snyder had shot enough material for a finished film, a campaign for a "Snyder Cut" began online, to allow Snyder to receive a similar treatment to Donner. Arguments were made that Snyder's vision would be more cohesive than the previous films than the actual theatrical cut, which Snyder has not yet seen. Warner Bros. initially remained silent regarding any intention of making a "Snyder Cut".

In March 2019, Snyder confirmed his original cut did exist and stated that it was up to Warner Bros. to release it. In November, Variety reported that Warner Bros. was unlikely to release Snyder's version of Justice League in theaters or on HBO Max, calling it a "pipe dream". In December, however, Snyder posted a photo on his Vero account, which showed boxes with tapes labeled "Z.S. J.L Director's cut", and with the caption "Is it real? Does it exist? Of course it does". In May 2020, Snyder officially announced his cut of Justice League for HBO Max for 2021 release date. The cut cost $70+ million to complete the special effects, musical score, editing, and additional shooting. Initially, the cut was planned to be a four-part miniseries, but was instead eventually released as a four-hour film. Snyder said that this version is non-canonical to DC Extended Universe continuity, existing in a slightly alternate universe. Jason Momoa, however, said that James Wan's Aquaman (2018) takes place after Zack Snyder's Justice League rather than Whedon's version, while Wonder Woman (2017) director Patty Jenkins said that no DC director considers Whedon's Justice League canonical, and that she had worked with Snyder to ensure Wonder Woman maintained continuity with his film.

=== DCEU cameos (2019–2023) ===
- Superman made a cameo appearance in the DCEU film Shazam! (2019), in which he appears briefly at the end. He is played by Ryan Hadley, Zachary Levi's body double, owing to Cavill's unavailability. He appears from the neck down after Billy Batson announces to Freddy Freeman that he invited another person to sit with them at lunch. Upon seeing him, Freddy gasps in shock.
- Superman is referenced in The Suicide Squad (2021). Amanda Waller states that Bloodsport, a new member of Task Force X, was arrested and imprisoned for shooting Superman with a Kryptonite bullet.
- Superman has made a cameo appearance in the DCEU TV series Peacemaker (2022), in which he appears briefly in the final episode of the first season. He and the Justice League, except Batman and Cyborg, are called by Waller to assist Christopher Smith / Peacemaker in facing the Butterfly army, but arrive too late, missing the fight. He is played by Brad Abramenko.
- Cavill reprised his role as the character in a cameo, filmed for the mid-credits scene of Black Adam (2022). In the scene, Superman is dispatched by Amanda Waller to Kahndaq, to talk with Black Adam.
- Nicolas Cage makes a cameo appearance as an alternate version of Superman in The Flash. CGI versions of Henry Cavill, George Reeves and Christopher Reeve also appear as Superman. Additionally, Sasha Calle stars as Supergirl with a CGI version of Helen Slater as Supergirl also making an appearance.

== DC Universe (2025–present) ==
=== Superman (2025) ===
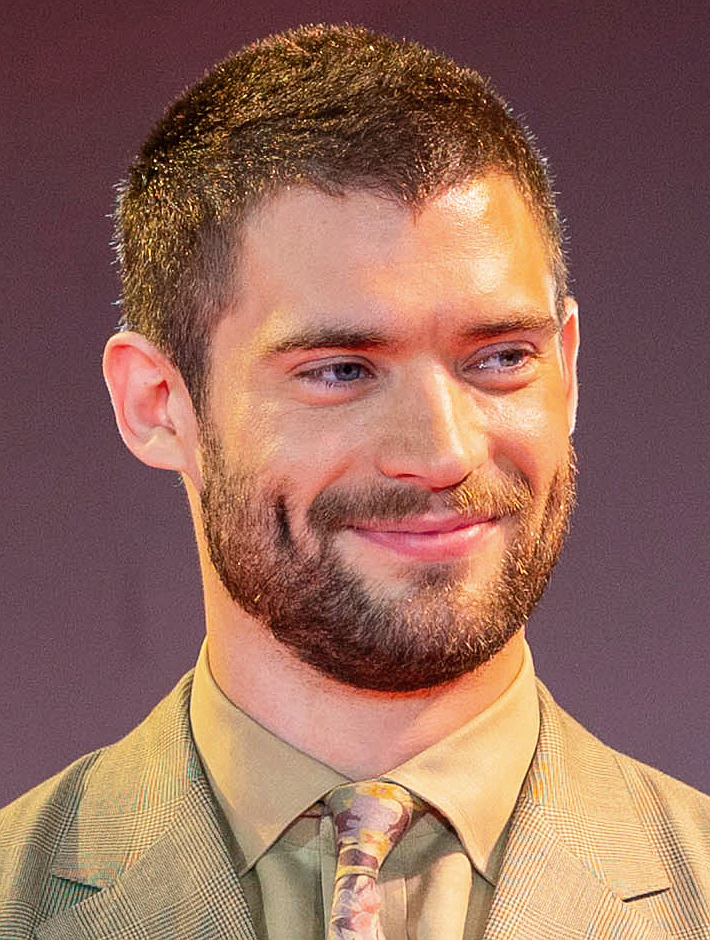
David Corenswet in 2025

In October 2022, filmmaker James Gunn and producer Peter Safran were appointed to serve as the co-chairmen and co-CEOs of the then-newly formed DC Studios to develop plans for a new DC shared universe slate. Gunn stated in December that Superman was a huge priority for the studio, and announced that he was writing a new Superman film that would focus on a younger version of the character, who would be depicted as a cub reporter interacting with key characters such as Lois Lane. As such, Henry Cavill was not expected to return, although Gunn and Safran met with the actor to discuss potentially working together in the future, including potentially portraying a different character. There was potential for Gunn to also direct the film, which was not expected to be an origin story for the character. The film's title was revealed to be Superman: Legacy in January 2023, with Gunn describing it as the "true start" to the studio's overarching narrative of the new DCU franchise, and is scheduled to be released on July 11, 2025. In June, David Corenswet was cast as Superman, and Rachel Brosnahan was cast as Lois Lane. In July, Isabela Merced, Edi Gathegi, and Nathan Fillion were cast as Hawkgirl, Mister Terrific, and Guy Gardner respectively. Anthony Carrigan was cast as Metamorpho right after. In November, Nicholas Hoult was cast to play Lex Luthor. By February 2024, the film had been retitled to Superman. A first look at Superman's suit emblem was also released, visually referencing Superman's appearance in DC Comics' Kingdom Come comic book miniseries.

=== Supergirl (2026) ===
In January 2023, James Gunn announced a standalone film featuring the character Supergirl set in the new DCU franchise, which would derive significantly from the Supergirl: Woman of Tomorrow miniseries by writer Tom King. Both Superman (2025) and Supergirl will be part of Chapter 1 of the DCU which is titled as Gods and Monsters. In November, Ana Nogueira was set to write the screenplay. In January 2024, Milly Alcock was cast as Supergirl to debut in another DCU project, reported to be Superman. Craig Gillespie entered talks to direct the film in April 2024, and was confirmed as director the next month when the film was given its release date. Filming took place from January to May 2025 and is scheduled to release theatrically on June 26, 2026.

=== Man of Tomorrow (2027) ===
In June 2025, Gunn said he had begun writing a follow-up to Superman that would not be a direct sequel, but would feature Superman in a major role. Corenswet and Brosnahan had options for a potential sequel, but following Superman's release in July, a direct sequel was not expected to be imminently announced. In August, Zaslav confirmed that Gunn was writing and directing the next film in the "Super-Family", which Gunn said he had finished writing a script treatment for. He described it as the next story in the "Superman Saga" and hoped to begin production soon. In September, Gunn announced that the film was titled Man of Tomorrow and it was given a release date of July 9, 2027.

=== Appearances in DCU media ===
- Clark Kent / Superman and Kara Zor-El / Supergirl make non-speaking cameo appearances in the animated series Creature Commandos, where they are depicted in a vision for a potential future, having been killed alongside several other heroes such as Batman, Wonder Woman, Hawkgirl, Peacemaker, Vigilante, Blue Beetle, Booster Gold, Starfire, Mister Terrific, Green Lantern, Robin, Flash, and Judomaster.
- Clark Kent / Superman and Kara Zor-El / Supergirl make non-speaking cameo appearances in the Peacemaker episode "The Ties That Grind", as silhouettes along with the Justice Gang, consisting of Mister Terrific, Guy Gardner, and Hawkgirl. They were contacted by Amanda Waller to aid Peacemaker and the 11th Street Kids against the Butterfly invasion, only to arrive too late. Their scene is a reshoot of the climax of the episode "It's Cow or Never", which originally featured the DCEU's Justice League (Superman, Wonder Woman, Aquaman and The Flash).

== Abandoned projects ==
=== Superman V (1980s/90s) ===
Before the failure of Superman: IV The Quest for Peace (1987), The Cannon Group considered producing a fifth Superman film with Albert Pyun attached as director. Cannon's subsequent bankruptcy resulted in the film rights reverting back to producers Alexander and Ilya Salkind. Under the Salkinds, development began on a sequel initially titled Superman: The New Movie, which was later retitled Superman Reborn. The project was intended to revive the franchise following Superman IV, with Christopher Reeve and Margot Kidder expected to reprise their roles as Superman and Lois Lane. The story reportedly featured the villain Brainiac and involved Superman dying and being resurrected in the bottled Kryptonian city of Kandor. The premise of Superman’s death and rebirth predated the 1992 DC Comics storyline The Death of Superman. The project should not be confused with a separate screenplay of the same title written by Jonathan Lemkin during the same period as part of other attempts to relaunch the character.

On November 12, 2024, a live script reading performance of Superman Reborn took place in Hollywood, California. The performance used an early draft of the script approved by producer Ilya Salkind and writers Mark Jones and Cary Bates prior to later revisions requested by Warner Bros. and DC Comics. The reading was followed by a question-and-answer session with Salkind and Jones, during which they stated that George P. Cosmatos had previously been attached to direct the film before leaving the project. The event partnered with the Christopher & Dana Reeve Foundation to raise funds for spinal cord injury research. A recording of the performance was later released on David Kocher’s YouTube channel on February 13, 2025.

=== Superman Reborn (1995) ===
"In any good Superman movie, the fate of the whole planet should be at stake. You've got to have villains whose powers and abilities demand that Superman (and only Superman) can be the one who stops them. That's the only way to make the movie exciting and a dramatic challenge".

— Writer Jonathan Lemkin on writing Superman Reborn

With the success of "The Death of Superman" comic book storyline, Warner Bros. purchased the film rights of Superman from the Salkinds in 1993, and hired producer Jon Peters to develop a new Superman film. Peters, in turn, hired Jonathan Lemkin to write a new script. Major toy companies insisted on seeing Lemkin's screenplay before the deadline of the 1993 American International Toy Fair.

Lemkin's script in March 1995, titled Superman Reborn, featured Lois Lane and Clark Kent with relationship troubles, and Superman's battle with Doomsday. When Superman professes his love to Lois, his life force jumps between them just as he dies, giving Lois a virgin birth. Their child, who grows to adulthood in three weeks, becomes the resurrected Superman and saves the world. Warner Brothers did not like the script because of the similar underlying themes with Bruce Wayne's obligations of heroism found in Batman Forever (1995).

To rewrite Lemkin's text, Peters hired Gregory Poirier, whose December 1995 script had Brainiac creating Doomsday, infused with "Kryptonite blood". In Poirier's script, Superman has romance problems with Lois Lane and visits a psychiatrist before he is killed by Doomsday. An alien named Cadmus, a victim of Brainiac, steals his corpse. Superman is resurrected and teams with Cadmus to defeat Brainiac. Powerless, Superman wears a robotic suit until his powers—which, according to the script, are a mental discipline called "Phin-yar"—return. At Peters' request, Poirier had Superman wear an all-black suit at the end of the script. Other villains included Parasite and Silver Banshee. Though Poirier's script impressed Warner Brothers, Kevin Smith was hired to rewrite; Smith thought that Poirier's script did not respect the Superman mythos properly.

=== Superman Lives (1998) ===
Kevin Smith pitched Jon Peters his story outline in late 1996, and he was allowed to write the screenplay under certain conditions:

- Peters did not want Superman to fly, arguing that the character would "look like an overgrown Boy Scout". Smith wrote Superman flying as "a red-and-blue blur in flight, creating a sonic boom every time he flew".
- Peters also wanted Superman to fight a giant spider in the third act.

Smith accepted the terms, realizing that he was being hired to execute a preordained idea. Peters would go on to insist further additions:

- Smith was also forced to write a scene involving Brainiac fighting a polar bear at the Fortress of Solitude.
- The Star Wars 20th anniversary re-release in theaters prompted Peters to commission a "space dog" that Brainiac could present to Luthor purely for merchandising appeal and toy sales.
- Peters also insisted that Brainiac's robot assistant L-Ron was to be voiced by Dwight Ewell, calling the character "a gay R2-D2 with attitude".

Smith's script, titled Superman Lives, had Brainiac sending Doomsday to kill Superman, as well as blocking out the sun to make Superman powerless, as Superman is fueled by sunlight. Brainiac teams up with Lex Luthor, but Superman is resurrected by a Kryptonian robot, the Eradicator. Brainiac wishes to possess the Eradicator and its technology. Powerless, the resurrected Superman is sheathed in a robotic suit formed from the Eradicator itself until his powers return, courtesy of sunbeams, and defeats Brainiac. Smith said that he originally wrote Brainiac with someone like Patrick Stewart in mind, however the studio was talking about casting Nicolas Cage as Brainiac. Smith recommended that Cage play Superman instead. Smith's "dream casting choices" included Ben Affleck as Clark Kent/Superman, Linda Fiorentino as Lois Lane, Jack Nicholson as Lex Luthor, Famke Janssen as Mercy Graves, John Mahoney as Perry White, David Hyde Pierce as the Eradicator, Jason Lee as Brainiac, and Jason Mewes as Jimmy Olsen. Affleck would go on to portray Superman actor George Reeves in the 2006 film Hollywoodland, and Batman in the DC Extended Universe, beginning with Batman v Superman: Dawn of Justice in 2016.

Robert Rodriguez was offered the chance to direct, but turned down the offer due to his commitment to The Faculty (1998), despite liking Smith's script.

Smith originally suggested Tim Burton to direct his script, and Burton signed on with a pay-or-play contract of $5 million. Smith was told that as soon as Burton signed on to direct that he said “I'm going to go another way, I'm going to do my own version of Superman". Warner Bros. originally planned on a theatrical release date for summer 1998, the 60th anniversary of the character's debut in Action Comics. Smith said that Peters first choice for Superman was Sean Penn. Nicolas Cage, a comic book fan, signed on as Superman with a $20 million pay-or-play contract, believing he could "reconceive the character". Peters also felt Cage could "convince audiences he [Superman] came from outer space". Burton explained Cage's casting would be "the first time you would believe that nobody could recognize Clark Kent as Superman, he [Cage] could physically change his persona". Kevin Spacey was approached for the role of Lex Luthor, while Christopher Walken was Burton's choice for Brainiac, a role also considered for Jim Carrey and Gary Oldman. Sandra Bullock, Courteney Cox and Julianne Moore had been approached for Lois Lane, while Chris Rock was cast as Jimmy Olsen. Michael Keaton confirmed his involvement, but when asked if he would be reprising his role as Bruce Wayne / Batman from Burton's Batman films, he would only reply, "Not exactly".

Filming was originally set to begin in early 1998.

==== Rewrites and production ====
In the summer of 1997, Superman Lives entered pre-production, with an art department employed under production designer Rick Heinrichs. Burton hired Wesley Strick to rewrite Smith's script, which disappointed Smith, who commented:

The studio was happy with what I was doing. Then Tim Burton got involved, and when he signed his pay-or-play deal, he turned around and said he wanted to do his version of Superman. So, who is Warner Bros. going back to? The guy who made Clerks, or the guy who made them half a billion dollars on Batman?

When Strick read Smith's script, he was annoyed with the fact that "Superman was accompanied/shadowed by someone/something called the Eradicator". He also felt that "Brainiac's evil plot of launching a disk in space to block out the sun and make Superman powerless was reminiscent of an episode of The Simpsons, with Mr. Burns doing the Brainiac role". After reading The Death and Return of Superman, Strick was able to understand some of the elements of Smith's script. Strick's rewrite featured Superman as an existentialist, thinking of himself as an outsider on Earth. Superman is threatened by Brainiac and Lex Luthor, who later amalgamate into "Lexiac", described by Strick as "a schizo/scary mega-villain". Superman is later resurrected by the power of 'K', a natural force representing the spirit of Krypton, as he defeats Lexiac.

Art designer Sylvain Despretz claimed the art department was assigned to create something that had little or nothing to do with the Superman comic book, and also explained that Peters "would bring kids in, who would rate the drawings on the wall as if they were evaluating the toy possibilities. It was basically a toy show". Peters saw a cover of National Geographic, containing a picture of a skull, going to art department workers, telling them he wanted the design for Brainiac's spaceship to have the same image. Burton gave Despretz a concept drawing for Brainiac, which Despretz claims was "a cone with a round ball on top, and something that looked like an emaciated skull inside. Imagine you take Merlin's hat, and you stick a fish bowl on top, with a skull in it". Concept artist Rolf Mohr said in an interview that he designed a suit for the Eradicator for a planned scene in which it transforms into a flying vehicle.

"We got the Kevin Smith script, but we were told not to read it, because they knew he wasn't going to stay on the movie. So we used Kevin Smith's script as a guide to the sets we might be doing, and we waited and waited for the new script to come in, but it never did".

— Art designer Sylvain Despretz on designing Superman Lives

Burton chose Pittsburgh, Pennsylvania as his primary filming location for Metropolis, while start dates for filming were pushed back. A minor piece of the Krypton set was constructed but then destroyed, and Cage had even attended a costume fitting.

The studio was also considering changing the title Superman Lives back to Superman Reborn. Deeming Wesley Strick's script too expensive, Warner Bros. enlisted the help of Dan Gilroy to rewrite it into something more economically feasible. Gilroy lowered the $190 million budget set by Strick's draft to $100 million, but the studio was still less willing to fast-track production, due to financial reasons with other film properties, having Gilroy turn in two drafts.

==== Abandonment ====
In April 1998, also following the critical failure of the 1997 film Batman & Robin, Warner Bros. ultimately chose to put the film on hold; at this point in production, the studio had spent $30 million on developing the film. Burton, having left to direct Sleepy Hollow (1999), cited differences with Peters and the studio: "I basically wasted a year. A year is a long time to be working with somebody that you don't really want to be working with".

Disappointed by the lack of progress on the film's production, aspiring screenwriter/comic book fan Alex Ford was able to have a script of his (titled Superman: The Man of Steel) accepted at the studio's offices in September 1998. Ford pitched his idea for a film series consisting of seven installments, and his approach impressed Warner Bros. and Peters, though he was later given a farewell due to creative differences. Ford said:

I can tell you they don't know much about comics. Their audience isn't you and me, who pay $7.00. It's for the parents who spend $60 on toys and lunchboxes. It is a business, and what's more important, the $150 million at the box office or the $600 million in merchandising?

With Gilroy's script, Peters offered the director's position to Michael Bay, Shekhar Kapur, and Martin Campbell, though they all turned down the offer. Brett Ratner turned down the option in favor of The Family Man. Simon West and Stephen Norrington were reportedly top contenders as well. In June 1999, William Wisher Jr. was hired to write a new script, and Cage assisted on story elements. Cage dropped out of the project in June 2000, while Wisher turned in a new script in August, reported to have contained similar elements with The Matrix. Oliver Stone was then approached to direct Wisher's script, but declined. Peters offered Will Smith the role of Superman, but Smith turned it down over concerns his ethnicity could result in him facing retaliation from the film industry for taking the role. Smith would eventually played Floyd Lawton/Deadshot in DC Extended Universe.

==== Retrospective development (2015–2018, 2023) ====
The film's backstory was covered in the 2015 documentary film The Death of "Superman Lives": What Happened?. Kevin Smith would go on to direct the ninth episode of the second season of Supergirl, which was titled "Supergirl Lives" as homage to Superman Lives.

In November 2016, Kevin Smith said that he was open to having the Superman Lives script be adapted as an animated film, with Nicolas Cage voicing Superman and Michael Rooker voicing Lex Luthor. The following year, Batman vs. Two-Face writer Michael Jelenic revealed that he originally pitched an animated film based on Smith's Superman Lives script, saying that Warner Bros seriously considered it for a long time. According to Jelenic, Cage would have loved to voice Superman in the film, but the idea never materialized and his pitch was abandoned.

Cage was ultimately cast to voice Superman in the animated film Teen Titans Go! To the Movies, based on the Teen Titans Go! cartoon show, which was released in July 2018. In 2019, Cage was approached to play Superman, in live-action form, by Marc Guggenheim and the producers of the Arrowverse five-part crossover event "Crisis on Infinite Earths", which aired from December 2019 to January 2020, but Cage's inclusion was ultimately dropped for unknown reasons. In 2023, Cage made a cameo as Superman in The Flash, directed by Andy Muschietti. The film includes a scene rendered through computer-generated imagery where Cage as Superman, exactly as he looks in the 1990s test footage, fights a robotic spider, as an homage to the demand that Jon Peters gave to Kevin Smith.

=== Batman vs. Superman: Asylum (2004) ===
In the early 2000s, Warner Bros. wanted to reboot the Superman film series with an origin story and ignore "The Death of Superman" storyline that had been stuck in development limbo through the late 1990s.

In 2001, screenwriter Paul Attanasio was almost signed to pen a new script for producer Jon Peters; although McG being widely reported as attached to Attanasio's Superman script, which was greenlit, he dropped out in favor of Charlie's Angels: Full Throttle (2003). Ultimately, Andrew Kevin Walker was hired in August that year after pitching Warner Bros. an idea titled Batman vs. Superman, attaching Wolfgang Petersen as director.

In February 2002, filmmaker J. J. Abrams was hired to write a new screenplay for a stand-alone Superman film, going under the title of Superman: Flyby, again approaching Petersen to direct. In July, Abrams turned in his script, designed to be the first of a trilogy. Lorenzo di Bonaventura—Warner Bros' executive vice president for worldwide motion pictures—though liking Abrams' script, nonetheless planned to release Batman vs Superman first. Abrams' script was thereby put on hold in favor of Walker's Batman vs. Superman idea.

Walker's draft was thought of as too dark by the studio, which hired Akiva Goldsman to do a rewrite, which was codenamed Asylum. Goldsman's draft, dated June 21, 2002, introduced Bruce Wayne attempting to shake all of the demons in his life after his 5-year retirement from crime-fighting. Dick Grayson, Alfred Pennyworth, and Commissioner Gordon are all dead. Meanwhile, Clark Kent is down on his luck and in despair after his divorce from Lois Lane. Clark serves as Bruce's best man at his wedding to the beautiful Elizabeth Miller. After Elizabeth is killed by the Joker at the honeymoon, Bruce is forced to don the Batsuit once more, tangling a plot which involves Lex Luthor, while Clark begins a romance with Lana Lang in Smallville and tries to pull Bruce back. In return, Bruce blames Clark for her death, and the two go against one another, prodded on by Luthor. After Batman decides not to succumb to his rage, the two team up, stop Luthor in his mechanized suit, and an incoming meteor storm. The studio wanted Johnny Depp as Batman and Josh Hartnett as Superman.

Christian Bale, who was being considered for the lead in Darren Aronofsky's Batman: Year One adaptation at the time (another canceled film), was simultaneously approached by Petersen for the Batman role. Petersen confirmed in a 2010 interview that the only actor he approached for Superman was Josh Hartnett. Warner Bros canceled development to focus on individual Superman and Batman projects after Abrams submitted another draft for Superman: Flyby. Christopher Nolan cast Bale as Batman the following year in Batman Begins.

In the opening scene of I Am Legend, a large banner displays the Superman symbol within the Batman symbol in Times Square. It is meant as an in-joke by writer Goldsman, who wrote the scripts for both Batman vs. Superman and I Am Legend.

=== Superman: Man of Steel (2004) ===
Turning in his script in July 2002, J. J. Abrams' Superman: Man of Steel, commonly referred to as Superman: Flyby, was an origin story that included Krypton besieged by a civil war between Jor-El and his corrupt brother Kata-Zor. Before Kata-Zor sentences Jor-El to prison, Kal-El is launched to Earth to fulfill a prophecy. Adopted by Jonathan and Martha Kent, he forms a romance with Lois Lane in the Daily Planet. Lois, however, is more concerned with exposing Lex Luthor, written as a government agent obsessed with UFO phenomena. Clark reveals himself to the world as Superman, bringing Kata-Zor's son, Ty-Zor, and three other Kryptonians to Earth. Superman is defeated and killed, and visits Jor-El (who committed suicide on Krypton while in prison) in Kryptonian heaven. Resurrected, he returns to Earth and defeats the four Kryptonians. The script ends with Superman flying off to Krypton in a spaceship.

Brett Ratner was hired to direct in September 2002, originally expressing an interest in casting an unknown for the lead role, while filming was to start sometime in late 2003. Christopher Reeve joined as project consultant, citing Tom Welling, who portrayed the teenage Clark Kent in Smallville, as an ideal candidate. Reeve added that "the character is more important than the actor who plays him, because it is an enduring mythology. It definitely should be an unknown". Ratner approached Josh Hartnett, Jude Law, Paul Walker and Brendan Fraser for Superman, but conceded that finding a famous actor for the title role had proven difficult because of contractual obligations to appear in sequels: "No star wants to sign that, but as much as I've told Jude and Josh my vision for the movie, I've warned them of the consequences of being Superman. They'll live this character for 10 years because I'm telling one story over three movies and plan to direct all three if the first is as successful as everyone suspects". Hartnett in particular was offered $100 million for a three-picture deal, but turned it down as he didn't want his life be "shallowed up" by his work. Walker tested for the role and seriously considered taking it, but later declined it and as well the $10 million deal as he felt it wasn't for him. He would later explained that "I could have made a gazillion dollars on that franchise. I could probably have bought my own fleet of jets or my own island. You know what? I don't need it". Law immediately felt he was wrong for the part upon putting on the costume, admitting that it was a "step too far". David Boreanaz, Victor Webster and Ashton Kutcher auditioned, along with Keri Russell as Lois Lane, but Kutcher decided not to pursue the role, citing scheduling conflicts with That '70s Show, the Superman curse and fear of typecasting, while Boreanaz had to back out due to obligations with Angel. James Marsden stated in a 2006 interview that at one point he was approached by Ratner. Although it was never formally announced, Matt Bomer confirmed that he was in the running for the lead role, being Ratner's preferred choice at the time. Bomer would later voice the character in the 2013 animated film Superman: Unbound. Bomer later felt that the reason he ultimately did not get the role was due to him coming out as gay. Amy Adams had also auditioned for Lois Lane, and would eventually win the role eight years later when she was cast in Man of Steel.

Superman: Man of Steel was being met with a budget exceeding $200 million, not including money spent on Superman Reborn, Superman Lives, and Batman vs. Superman, but Warner Bros. was still adamant about a summer 2004 release date. Christopher Walken was in negotiations for Perry White, while Ratner wanted to cast Anthony Hopkins as Jor-El, and Ralph Fiennes as Lex Luthor, two of his cast members from Red Dragon. Joel Edgerton turned down a chance to audition as Superman in favor of the villain Ty-Zor, before Ratner dropped out of the project in March 2003, blaming casting delays, and aggressive feuds with producer Jon Peters.

McG returned as director in 2003, while Fraser continued to express interest, but had fears of typecasting. ESC Entertainment was hired for visual effects work, with Kim Libreri as visual effects supervisor and Stan Winston designing a certain "prototype suit". McG approached Shia LaBeouf for Jimmy Olsen, with an interest to cast an unknown for Superman, Scarlett Johansson as Lois Lane and Johnny Depp for Lex Luthor. Robert Downey Jr. was soon afterward cast as Lex Luthor. Neal H. Moritz and Gilbert Adler were set to produce the film. McG also commissioned Josh Schwartz to rewrite the Abrams script. He also shot test footage with several candidates, including Jason Behr, Henry Cavill, Jared Padalecki, and Michael Cassidy. McG left the project soon afterward, blaming budgetary concerns and disagreement over filming locations. He opted to shoot in New York City and Canada, but Warner Bros. wanted Sydney, Australia, which would have cost $25 million less. McG released a statement saying that he felt "it was inappropriate to try to capture the heart of America on another continent". He eventually admitted in a 2012 interview that his fear of flying was the real reason for his objection to Australia. Abrams lobbied for the chance to direct his script, but Warner Bros. replaced McG with Bryan Singer in July 2004, resulting in Superman Returns, which was released in 2006.

In August 2013, Geoff Johns mentioned that Warner Bros. was considering turning unproduced scripts and screenplays into original animated films and had expressed interest in making an animated adaptation of the "Flyby" screenplay.

=== Superman Returns sequel (2008–2009) ===
Four months before the release of Superman Returns, Warner Bros. announced a summer 2009 theatrical release date for a sequel, with Bryan Singer returning as director, along with Brandon Routh, Kevin Spacey, Kate Bosworth, Sam Huntington, Frank Langella, and Tristan Lake Leabu expected to reprise their roles.

After the release of Superman Returns in July 2006, the studio was hesitant on moving forward with development. Warner Bros. President Alan F. Horn explained that Superman Returns was a successful film, but that it "should have done $500 million worldwide" and that the film could have featured more action for the young male audience. Singer was critical to the studio complaints, and considered that the film was financially successful enough to guarantee a sequel.

Filming was supposed to start in March 2008. While no screenplay was ever written, Singer would have titled it Man of Steel, stressing that it would have been more action-packed than Superman Returns.

Though Singer had an interest in Darkseid as the main villain, writer Michael Dougherty was interested in using Brainiac for the proposed sequel:

In my mind, if the Kryptonians really were a space-faring race ... it would only make sense that there would've been colonies and off-planet missions ... other Kryptonians making their way to Earth seemed like a pretty big one. It wouldn't necessarily be evil right off the bat. That's too easy and cliché ... I think it'd be interesting to see how these other Kryptonians show up, land, and have all these powers and [have to learn] how to adapt to them.

In February 2007, the studio commissioned husband and wife duo Michele and Kieran Mulroney to write a script for a Justice League film, halting development for the Superman Returns sequel. The Justice League script was submitted to Warner Bros. the following June, which prompted the studio to immediately fast-track production of what was to be titled Justice League: Mortal. As Singer went on to film Valkyrie (2008) the next month, George Miller signed to direct in September.

The script would have featured a different Superman in a separate continuity from Singer's film; Routh was not approached to reprise his role for Justice League: Mortal, which ended up going to D. J. Cotrona. The film nearly went into production in March 2008, but the Australian Film Commission denied Warner Brothers their 40% tax rebate and Cotrona's options eventually expired. With Justice League: Mortal canceled, Singer renewed his interest in the Superman Returns sequel that same month, stating that it was in early development. Paul Levitz, president of DC Comics, still expected the title role to be reprised by Routh, whose contract for a sequel expired in 2009.

In August 2008, the studio's President of Production, Jeff Robinov, admitted:

Superman Returns didn't quite work as a film in the way that we wanted it to.... It didn't position the character the way he needed to be positioned.... Had Superman worked in 2006, we would have had a movie for Christmas of this year or 2009. Now the plan is just to reintroduce Superman without regard to a Batman and Superman movie at all.

Routh later reprised his role as Superman in the 2019 Arrowverse television crossover "Crisis on Infinite Earths".

=== Justice League: Mortal (2009) ===
In February 2007, during pre-production for The Dark Knight, Warner Bros. hired husband and wife screenwriting duo Michelle and Kieran Mulroney to script a Justice League film featuring a younger Batman in a separate franchise.

George Miller was hired to direct the following September, with D. J. Cotrona cast as Superman, along with Armie Hammer as Batman. Filming had nearly commenced at Fox Studios Australia in Sydney, but was pushed back over the Writers Guild of America strike, and once more when the Australian Film Commission denied Warner Bros. a 45 percent tax rebate over lack of Australian actors in the film. Production offices were moved to Vancouver Film Studios in Canada for an expected July 2008 start and a planned summer 2009 theatrical release date, but Warner Bros. ultimately canceled Justice League following the success of The Dark Knight. Hammer's option on his contract lapsed, and the studio was more willing to proceed with Christopher Nolan to finish his trilogy separately with The Dark Knight Rises.

=== Man of Steel sequel (2014–2022) ===
Warner Bros. Pictures announced release dates for a full slate of DC Comics-based films in October 2014, forming a new shared universe known as the DC Extended Universe (DCEU). At the same time, the company said that an un-dated Superman film was in development, with Henry Cavill set to reprise his role of Clark Kent / Superman from Man of Steel (2013). Warner Bros. chose to prioritize Batman v Superman: Dawn of Justice (2016) as the second DCEU film after Man of Steel failed to meet the company's financial expectations, despite turning a profit. Director Zack Snyder said that Brainiac and the Kryptonians imprisoned in the Phantom Zone were considered as antagonists for the Man of Steel sequel before Warner Bros. decided to proceed with Batman v Superman. A sequel to Man of Steel entered active development in August 2016, and the studio wanted to get the character right for audiences. Henry Cavill and Amy Adams were expected to reprise their roles in the sequel. Matthew Vaughn was Warner Bros.' top choice to direct the film, and he had preliminary conversations about the project by March 2017. Vaughn had previously pitched an idea for a new Superman trilogy with comic book writer Mark Millar, before the development of Man of Steel, in which the destruction of the planet Krypton would not take place until after Superman had already grown-up on the planet. After the troubled production of the DCEU film Justice League (2017), Warner Bros. re-thought its approach to DC projects. By the end of 2017, a Man of Steel sequel was not coming "anytime soon, if at all". Justice League producer Charles Roven said that the story ideas for the film had been discussed, but there was no script.

Before the release of Mission: Impossible – Fallout in July 2018, director Christopher McQuarrie and co-star Cavill pitched their take on a new Superman film, but Warner Bros. did not pursue the idea. Later that year, the studio asked James Gunn to write and direct a Superman film, but he chose to make The Suicide Squad (2021) instead; Gunn was uncertain if he wanted to take on Superman, so Warner Bros. told him that he could adapt any DC property he liked. In September, negotiations for Cavill to reprise his role for a cameo appearance in Shazam! (2019) ended due to contract issues, as well as a scheduling conflict with Cavill's Fallout commitments. The actor was reported to be parting ways with the studio, with no plans for him to reprise his role in future projects, but, in November 2019, Cavill said that he had not given up on the character and still wanted to do the role justice. At that time, Warner Bros. was unsure which direction to take the character and was talking to "high-profile talent" about the property, including J. J. Abrams—whose company Bad Robot signed an overall deal with Warner Bros.' parent company WarnerMedia—and Michael B. Jordan, who pitched himself as a Black version of the character. By May 2020, Warner Bros. was no longer developing a Man of Steel sequel, but Cavill was in talks to appear in a different future DC film.

In October 2022, Warner Bros. re-entered the development of a sequel to Man of Steel with Roven serving as a producer and Michael Bay in talks to direct, and Cavill expected to reprise his role. The studio was searching for writers by then, and had a wishlist of directors that included McQuarrie, who reportedly had not been contacted and could be unable to direct due to his commitments to Mission: Impossible – Dead Reckoning Part One (2023) and Mission: Impossible – The Final Reckoning (2025). Cavill appeared that month in his role in the post-credits scene of the DCEU film Black Adam (2022). Cavill was revealed to have signed a one-off deal for Black Adam, though Warner Bros. was interested in having him return for future projects including another solo film, though there was only a verbal agreement on this. Shortly after, Warner Bros. announced that Cavill would return as Superman for future projects, and the actor said his Black Adam cameo was meant to be a starting point for plans for the character. Steven Knight had written a script treatment around that time, which reportedly included Brainiac as the antagonist. Warner Bros. executives were not thrilled about it and provided notes on it, and another writer was potentially hired due to Knight's busy schedule soon after. Andy Muschietti, who had directed The Flash (2023) for the studios, had expressed interest in directing a Superman project with a similar tone to Richard Donner's Superman (1978). Cavill had been paid $250,000 for each of his cameos in Black Adam and The Flash before the latter appearance was cut.

Cavill expressed interest in November for a future project to explore Superman's "capacity to give and to love" the people of Earth and to inspire others, and said he was looking forward to meet with James Gunn, who was then-recently appointed as the co-chairman and co-CEO of the newly formed DC Studios alongside Peter Safran, and was excited about future opportunities to work together. The project, however, was not moving forward quickly as Gunn and Safran were preparing their long-term plans for a DC shared universe, and Cavill did not sign a formal deal to return, and no writer or director was attached. By December, a Man of Steel sequel with Cavill was canceled as Gunn and Safran made plans with Warner Bros. Discovery CEO David Zaslav. The pair began development on a new film that would focus on a younger version of the character as a rising reporter in Metropolis interacting with key characters from his supporting cast such as Lois Lane. The film, titled Superman, released in July 2025 as the debut film of the new DC Universe (DCU) franchise with actor David Corenswet succeeding Cavill as Clark Kent / Superman.

=== Black-led Superman film (2021–2022) ===
In February 2021, Ta-Nehisi Coates was revealed to be writing a new Superman film for the DCEU that was in early development. J. J. Abrams was set as producer alongside Hannah Minghella, with no director or actors attached to the project yet. The film was expected to feature a Black actor portraying Superman, with potential for Michael B. Jordan to still take on the role after previously pitching himself as a Black version of the character. Coates said he was looking forward to "meaningfully adding to the legacy of America's most iconic mythic hero", while Abrams said the film would tell a "new, powerful and moving Superman story". This was reported by outlets as being a reboot of the franchise, but Richard Newby of The Hollywood Reporter felt the film starring a Black actor could indicate a new version of Superman that could exist alongside Cavill's portrayal within the DC Multiverse. Newby also noted that Coates' history as a non-fiction author and journalist focusing on African-American issues would give him "the insight and experience to delve further into the [Superman] mythos in a way never seen on screen".

Jordan said at the end of April that suggestions he star in the film were a compliment, but he would not be signing on to the role. The studio was in the early process of finding a director for the film at that point, and had committed to hiring a Black filmmaker for the project. They had met with potential directors by early May, working from a list that included Steven Caple Jr., J. D. Dillard, Regina King, and Shaka King; Dillard later said that he had not been approached for the film. Coates was not expected to deliver his script for the film until mid-December, and was believed to be introducing a new version of Kal-El / Superman in what was potentially a Civil Rights era-period piece. The film was believed to be set in a separate universe from the DCEU at that point. In July, Jordan's reasoning for distancing himself from the film was reported to be due to the decision to portray Kal-El as Black rather than introduce a different Superman character that is already portrayed as Black in the comics, such as Calvin Ellis or Val-Zod. This was seen by some as racebending a White character while "erasing" existing Black characters, a conversation that Jordan did not want to engage in. Instead, he began developing a limited series for HBO Max focused on the Val-Zod version of the character. In October 2022, Abrams and Coates' film was revealed to be set in a separate continuity from other DC franchises, similar to Joker (2019). The film remained in active development by December under the then-recently formed DC Studios when its co-chairman and co-CEO James Gunn announced that he was writing a new Superman film, which would eventually become Superman (2025). In July 2025, The Wall Street Journal reported that shortly after the formation of Warner Bros. Discovery in 2022, CEO David Zaslav cancelled the project, saying the script was "too woke"; however people familiar with the matter stated that Gunn and other co-CEO Peter Safran could still attempt to make the film in the future. Gunn said the film was still in development in January 2024.

== Recurring cast and characters ==
List indicators

This section includes characters who will appear or have appeared in multiple film series that featured Superman.

- An empty grey cell indicates the character was not in the film, or that the character's official presence has not yet been confirmed.
- ^{A} indicates an appearance through archival footage or audio.
- ^{C} indicates a cameo role.
- ^{O} indicates an older version of the character.
- ^{P} indicates an appearance in onscreen photographs.
- ^{S} indicates an appearance through use of special effects.
- ^{U} indicates an uncredited appearance.
- ^{V} indicates a voice-only role.
- ^{Y} indicates a younger version of the character.

Character	Fleisher / Famous Studio animated shorts (1941–1943)	Serial films (1948–1950)	Superman and the Mole Men (1951)	1978 film series (1978–1987)	Superman Returns (2006)	DC Extended Universe (2013–2023)	DC Universe (2025–)
Kal-El / Clark Kent Superman	Bud Collyer^{V} Lee Royce^{V}	Kirk Alyn Mason Alan Dinehart^{Y}	George Reeves	Christopher Reeve (Note: Additionally, Lee Quigley, and Elizabeth Sweetman portray a young Kal-El at different ages in Superman (1978).) Jeff East^{Y} Aaron Smolinski^{Y}	Brandon Routh Stephan Bender^{Y}	Henry Cavill (Note: Additionally, Dylan Sprayberry and Cooper Timberline portray a young Kal-El at different ages in Man of Steel, Ryan Hadley serves as a stand-in for the character in Shazam! (2019), and Nicolas Cage portrays a Superman from an alternate universe in The Flash.) Dylan Sprayberry^{Y} Cooper Timberline^{Y} George Reeves^{C}^{S} (Note: This version of the character is that seen in Superman and the Mole Men.) Christopher Reeve^{C}^{S} (Note: This version of the character is that seen in the Salkind series.)	David Corenswet Oliver Diego Silva^{Y}
Lois Lane	Joan Alexander^{V} Barbara Willock^{V}	Noel Neill	Phyllis Coates	Margot Kidder	Kate Bosworth	Amy Adams	Rachel Brosnahan
Perry White	Julian Noa^{V}	Pierre Watkin		Jackie Cooper	Frank Langella	Laurence Fishburne	Wendell Pierce
Jimmy Olsen	Jack Mercer^{V}	Tommy Bond		Marc McClure	Sam Huntington	Michael Cassidy^{C}	Skyler Gisondo
Jonathan Kent		Edward Cassidy (Note: This incarnation of Jonathan Kent is known as "Eben".)		Glenn Ford	Glenn Ford^{P}	Kevin Costner	Pruitt Taylor Vince
Martha Kent		Virginia Caroll		Phyllis Thaxter	Eva Marie Saint	Diane Lane	Neva Howell
Jor-El		Nelson Leigh		Marlon Brando	Marlon Brando^{A}	Russell Crowe	Bradley Cooper
Lara Lor-Van		Luana Walters		Susannah York		Ayelet Zurer	Angela Sarafyan
Lex Luthor		Lyle Talbot		Gene Hackman	Kevin Spacey	Jesse Eisenberg	Nicholas Hoult
Eve Teschmacher				Valerie Perrine			Sara Sampaio
Otis				Ned Beatty			Terence Rosemore
General Zod				Terence Stamp		Michael Shannon Greg Plitt^{S}	
Lana Lang				Annette O'Toole Diane Sherry^{Y}		Jadin Gould Emily Peterson^{O}	
Kara Zor-El / Linda Danvers Supergirl				Helen Slater		Sasha Calle Helen Slater^{C}^{S} (Note: This version of the character is that seen in the Supergirl film.)	Milly Alcock Imogen Turner^{Y}
Zor-El				Simon Ward			David Krumholtz
Alura In-Ze				Mia Farrow			Emily Beecham
Steve Lombard						Michael Kelly	Beck Bennett
Wonder Woman						Gal Gadot	TBA

== Reception ==
=== Box office performance ===
Film	Release date		Box office gross			Ref(s)
Film	North America	Other territories	North America	Other territories	Worldwide	Ref(s)
Superman (1978)	December 15, 1978		$134,451,603	$166,000,000	$300,218,018	
Superman II	June 19, 1981	December 4, 1980	$108,185,706	$108,200,000	$216,385,706	
Superman III	June 17, 1983		$59,950,623	$20,300,000	$80,250,623	
Supergirl (1984)	November 21, 1984	July 19, 1984	$14,296,438	—N/a	$14,296,438	
Superman IV: The Quest for Peace	July 24, 1987		$15,681,020	$14,600,000	$30,281,020	
Superman Returns	June 28, 2006		$200,081,192	$191,000,000	$391,081,192	
Man of Steel	June 14, 2013		$291,045,518	$379,100,000	$670,145,518	
Batman v Superman: Dawn of Justice	March 25, 2016		$330,360,194	$544,000,000	$874,360,194	
Justice League	November 17, 2017		$229,024,295	$432,302,692	$661,326,987	
Superman (2025)	July 11, 2025		$354,223,803	$264,500,000	$618,723,803	
Supergirl (2026)	June 24, 2026		$71,986,393	$53,800,000	$125,786,393	
Total			$1,809,286,785	$2,169,900,000	$3,979,033,226	

=== Critical and public response ===
Film	Rotten Tomatoes	Metacritic	CinemaScore
Superman (1978)	87% (123 reviews)	82 (21 reviews)	—N/a
Superman II	88% (113 reviews)	83 (16 reviews)	A+
Superman III	31% (103 reviews)	44 (15 reviews)	B−
Supergirl (1984)	20% (133 reviews)	41 (13 reviews)	C+
Superman IV: The Quest for Peace	16% (118 reviews)	24 (18 reviews)	C
Superman Returns	72% (290 reviews)	72 (40 reviews)	B+
Man of Steel	57% (342 reviews)	55 (47 reviews)	A−
Batman v Superman: Dawn of Justice	28% (437 reviews)	44 (51 reviews)	B
Justice League	39% (411 reviews)	45 (52 reviews)	B+
Zack Snyder's Justice League	71% (314 reviews)	54 (46 reviews)	—N/a
Superman (2025)	83% (502 reviews)	68 (58 reviews)	A−

== Home media ==
=== Collections ===
The initial four Superman films starring Christopher Reeve were released previously on VHS, and throughout the film series' history, three box sets of the films have been released by Warner Bros. The first occurred on May 1, 2001, when The Complete Superman Collection was released both on DVD and VHS, containing that year's DVD/home video releases of Superman, II, III, and IV: The Quest for Peace. The set was valued at US$49.99 for the DVD release and US$29.99 for the VHS release, and received positive reviews.

The four Christopher Reeve films were again released on November 28, 2006, in new DVD releases to coincide with Superman Returns, also released in that year. Superman (1978) was released in a four-disc 'special edition' similar to Superman II, which was released in a two-disc special edition. Both Superman III and IV were released in single-disc 'deluxe editions', and all four releases were available together in The Christopher Reeve Superman Collection, an 8-disc set that was valued at US$79.92 and received positive reviews (like the 2001 set before it).

Also on November 28, 2006, a 14-disc DVD box set titled Superman Ultimate Collector's Edition was released, containing the four Reeve films, along with Superman II: The Richard Donner Cut, Superman Returns, and Look, Up in the Sky: The Amazing Story of Superman, among other releases. All contents of the set were housed within a tin case. The set was valued at US$99.92, and received extremely positive reviews when first released. After only a day on the market, however, Warner Bros. announced that there were two errors discovered within the set: the first was that the 2.0 audio track on Superman, was instead the 5.1 audio track already on the disc; and the second was that the Superman III disc was not the 2006 deluxe edition as advertised, but the 2001 release instead. The set was soon recalled, and Warner Bros offered a toll-free number to replace the faulty discs for people who had already purchased the set. Due to popular demand, a corrected set was released and Superman Ultimate Collector's Edition returned to store shelves on May 29, 2007.

Another Christopher Reeve Superman film collection was released on October 14, 2008, entitled Superman: 4 Film Favorites, containing all four films, but with far less bonus material than previous sets. The collection was a 2-disc DVD-18 set that included the first disc of both special editions from the 2006 release and both deluxe editions.

The entire Superman anthology was released on Blu-ray for the first time on June 7, 2011.

All of the Christopher Reeve Superman films were released on Ultra HD Blu-ray in 2023.

== See also ==
- Superman curse — a series of supposedly related incidents, sometimes fatal, that have affected many associated with producing Superman in film and animation
- Superman franchise media
- Batman in film
- Steel (1997)
- Hollywoodland (2006) — a mystery drama film that presents a fictionalized account of the circumstances surrounding the death of actor George Reeves, the star of the 1950s television series Adventures of Superman.
- Brightburn (2019) — a superhero horror film that adapts the concept of Superman for explicit horror. It follows Brandon Breyer, a young boy of extraterrestrial origin reared on Earth, who discovers he has superpowers, using them with dark intentions.

== Bibliography ==
- Rossen, Jake (2008). Superman vs. Hollywood: How Fiendish Producers, Devious Directors, and Warring Writers Grounded an American Icon. Chicago Review Press. ISBN 978-1-55652-731-9.
- Scivally, Bruce (2008). Superman On Film: Film, Television, Radio And Broadway. McFarland & Company. ISBN 978-0-7864-3166-3.
- Tye, Larry (2013). Superman: The High-Flying History of America's Most Enduring Hero. Random House Trade Paperbacks. ISBN 978-0-8129-8077-6.
- Weldon, Glen (2013). Superman: The Unauthorized Biography. Wiley. ISBN 978-1-118-34184-1.
