= Volcano (1942 film) =

- Title card from Volcano
- Directed by: Dave Fleischer
- Story by: Bill Turner; Carl Meyer
- Based on: Superman by: Jerry Siegel; Joe Shuster
- Produced by: Max Fleischer
- Starring: Bud Collyer; Joan Alexander; Jackson Beck
- Music by: Sammy Timberg
- Animation by: Willard Bowsky; Otto Feuer
- Color process: Technicolor
- Production company: Fleischer Studios
- Distributed by: Paramount Pictures
- Release date: July 10, 1942
- Running time: 8 minutes (one reel)
- Language: English

Volcano (1942) is the eighth of seventeen animated Technicolor short films based upon the DC Comics character of Superman, originally created by Jerry Siegel & Joe Shuster. The eight-minute animated short, directed by Dave Fleischer and produced by Fleischer Studios, features Superman's adventures in saving a large island community from a volcanic eruption. It was originally released on July 10, 1942 by Paramount Pictures.

== Plot ==
Full film

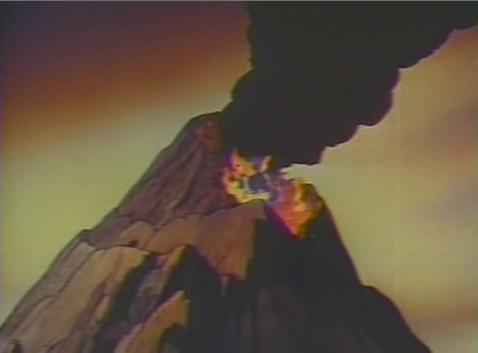
The erupting Mt. Monokoa.

Scientists at the Bureau of Meteorology check Mt. Monokoa, a volcano that has been dormant for 300 years but is beginning to produce slight tremors, threatening the city below. Lois Lane and Clark Kent are sent to the island by Perry White, who admonishes them to work together for a change. On arrival, Clark cannot find his press pass, Lois having hidden it in her purse so as to get the story all to herself. He goes to police headquarters to acquire another as Lois tours the volcano. An engineer tells her that to save the city, they plan to blow a hole in the rim of the volcano, thus diverting the lava from the city to the ocean.

The volcano suddenly erupts, and lava flows towards the city. Men on the volcano scramble to activate the machinery which will blow a hole in its rim, but a boulder cuts the wire connecting the dynamite to the power. Clark hears the volcano erupting and changes into his Superman costume. He flies to the volcano, catching a huge boulder hurtling toward the city and flinging it into the ocean. Lois flees from the volcano by climbing hand over hand along a cable to the stalled cable car, but the cable's anchor is dislodged by lava. Alerted by her scream, Superman flies her to safety, then catches the cable car and flings it at a mound near the advancing lava, causing a landslide that dams up the lava flow. Superman flies to the dynamite machinery and notices the cut wire. He pulls the wire together to complete the connection. The rim of the volcano explodes, and the lava slides harmlessly into the ocean.

Lois and Clark take a boat home. While Lois is writing her story, Clark walks in and notices his press pass sticking out of her open purse.

== Cast ==
- Bud Collyer as Clark Kent/Superman, Professor, Police Officer, Demolitions Expert #1
- Joan Alexander as Lois Lane
- Jackson Beck as Narrator, Guard, Demolitions Expert #2
- Julian Noa as Perry White
