= The Magnetic Telescope =

Magnetic Telescope
- Title card from Magnetic Telescope
- Directed by: Dave Fleischer
- Story by: Dan Gordon; Carl Meyer
- Based on: Superman by: Jerry Siegel; Joe Shuster
- Produced by: Max Fleischer
- Starring: Bud Collyer; Joan Alexander; Julian Noa; Jackson Beck
- Music by: Sammy Timberg
- Animation by: Thomas Moore; Myron Waldman
- Color process: Technicolor
- Production company: Fleischer Studios
- Distributed by: Paramount Pictures
- Release date: April 24, 1942
- Running time: 8 minutes (one reel)
- Language: English

The Magnetic Telescope (1942) is the sixth of the seventeen animated Technicolor short films based upon the DC Comics character of Superman, originally created by Jerry Siegel & Joe Shuster. This animated short was created by Fleischer Studios. The story runs for about eight minutes and covers Superman's adventures in saving the town from a comet drawn toward Earth by a magnetic telescope. It was originally released on April 24, 1942.

== Plot ==
Full film

A scientist demonstrates his magnetic telescope, drawing a comet towards Earth. The comet crashes into the town, rolls through the streets, and then tumbles into the ocean nearby. The disaster turns public opinion against the telescope experiments, but the scientist claims the importance of his work is worth the risk to human lives and uses the telescope to pull in another comet. To stop the danger, the police jam a metal bar into the electric generator running the telescope and cut its main wires with axes. The comet, now out of the scientist's control, hurtles towards the town.

As the police and scientist flee, Lois Lane calls the Daily Planet from the scientist's building, reporting the impending disaster as the building crumbles around her and pins her. Clark Kent takes a cab to the telescope. Pieces of the comet destroy the road in front of the cab, and the cabby flees. Clark changes clothes in the back of the car, becoming Superman.

Superman frees Lois from the rubble, then streaks towards the comet, striking it full-force. The impact knocks Superman unconscious. More comet-shards crush buildings, cars, and trains. Superman awakens and flies at the comet again, with similar results, falling into the telescope's generator room. He notices the metal bar in the generator and removes it, then winds some cable around its shaft and pulls, setting the generator into motion. He then completes the circuit to the scope by grabbing both ends of the cut wire and allowing the electric current to run through him. Lois sets the machine to reverse, and the comet is sent back into space. Superman's silhouette appears in the telescope control room, and Lois kisses him in admiration; much to her chagrin, the silhouette is Clark.

== Cast ==
- Bud Collyer as Clark Kent/Superman, Professor
- Joan Alexander as Lois Lane
- Julian Noa as Perry White
- Jackson Beck as the Narrator, Police Officer, Cab Driver
