= Electric Earthquake =

- Title card from Electric Earthquake
- Directed by: Dave Fleischer
- Story by: Seymour Kneitel; Isidore Sparber
- Based on: Superman by: Jerry Siegel; Joe Shuster
- Produced by: Max Fleischer
- Starring: Bud Collyer; Joan Alexander; Julian Noa; Jackson Beck
- Music by: Sammy Timberg
- Animation by: Steve Muffati; Arnold Gillespie
- Color process: Technicolor
- Production company: Fleischer Studios
- Distributed by: Paramount Pictures
- Release date: May 15, 1942
- Running time: 9 minutes (one reel)
- Language: English

Electric Earthquake (1942) is the seventh of seventeen animated Technicolor short films based upon the DC Comics character of Superman, originally created by Jerry Siegel & Joe Shuster. This animated short was created by the Fleischer Studios. The story runs for about nine minutes and covers Superman's adventures in stopping a madman from destroying Manhattan with electronically induced earthquakes. It was originally released on May 15, 1942. This is the first of the films to make it clear that the action is taking place in Manhattan.

== Plot ==
Full film

A Native American scientist demands the Daily Planet run a report that Manhattan belongs to his people and should be immediately vacated. Perry White dismisses him as a crank, and he storms off with a vague threat. Intrigued, Lois follows him to his motorboat. Hiding in the back, Lois is taken to a deserted fishing house and an elevator leading underwater. The scientist spots her in the elevator's reflection, brings her to his underwater capsule on the ocean floor, and restrains her in a mechanical chair. He starts up an earthquake machine, sending a surge of electricity through wires and into the bedrock under the city. This causes the entire city to shake and crumble. Clark Kent changes into his Superman costume.

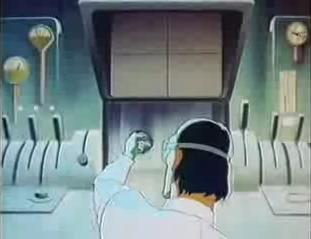
Starting up the earthquake machine.

Superman dives into the ocean and notices the wires embedded in the rock. He tries pulling them out, but the ends repeatedly explode in his face, destroying the bedrock, and tangle him up. Finally, Superman follows the wires to the underwater capsule and pulls them out from its base, causing explosions that destroy the machine. As water floods the capsule, the scientist takes the elevator to the surface. Superman spots the elevator and catches the scientist at the top, but is told that Lois is trapped, and darts back down to save her. The scientist loads the elevator with dynamite and sends it down after him. Superman frees Lois before the capsule explodes and captures the scientist as he is making a getaway in his motorboat.

Later, Clark and Lois watch the now-rebuilt Manhattan from a cruise ship and agree that it "looks just as good as ever".

== Cast ==
- Bud Collyer as Clark Kent/Superman
- Joan Alexander as Lois Lane
- Julian Noa as Perry White
- Jackson Beck as the Narrator, Native American Scientist
