= Billion Dollar Limited =

- Title card from Billion Dollar Limited
- Directed by: Dave Fleischer
- Story by: Seymour Kneitel; Isidore Sparber
- Based on: Superman by: Jerry Siegel; Joe Shuster
- Produced by: Max Fleischer
- Starring: Bud Collyer; Joan Alexander; Jackson Beck
- Music by: Sammy Timberg; Winston Sharples (uncredited); Lou Fleischer (uncredited)
- Animation by: Frank Endres; Myron Waldman
- Color process: Technicolor
- Production company: Fleischer Studios
- Distributed by: Paramount Pictures
- Release date: January 9, 1942
- Running time: 9 minutes (one reel)
- Language: English

Billion Dollar Limited (1942) is the third of seventeen animated Technicolor short films based upon the DC Comics character Superman. Produced by Fleischer Studios, Billion Dollar Limited centers on a train carrying one billion dollars in gold to the US Mint, which is sabotaged by robbers before Superman intervenes. The short was released by Paramount Pictures on January 9, 1942.

== Plot ==
Full film

A train is loaded with a billion dollars of gold, guarded by armed police officers, for shipment to the US Mint. Lois Lane, who is doing a story on the transfer, rides in a passenger car. Masked robbers board the train from the back and separate the final car carrying guards, leaving them stranded. Two other robbers attack the locomotive, throwing the engineer and a guard overboard, but fall off themselves. Lois, hearing the commotion, climbs to the engine's cab and is shot at from the robbers' car. Lois grabs the robbers' dropped machine gun and returns fire. A stationmaster notices the train does not stop at the next station, and sends out a telegraph. Clark Kent hears the news through the Daily Planet's telegraph, and discreetly enters a storage room, changing into his Superman costume.

The robbers force the train into a siding leading to a boxcar filled with explosives. Superman arrives, rips the track from the ground, and guides the train back onto the main line. The robbers demolish a bridge further ahead, causing the train to fall. Superman catches the train and places it back on the track. Finally, the robbers throw a bomb into the steam engine's boiler. Superman pulls Lois out before the boiler explodes. Both the locomotive and its tender car derail and fall into the canyon. Superman catches the lead car as the train rolls backwards, and pulls it up the hill. The robbers toss tear gas at him. After coughing and choking, Superman resumes marching up the hill despite the robbers' machine gun fire.

Superman pulls the train to the US Mint. The Daily Planet reports the delivery of the money and the capture of the robbers. Lois voices regret that she did not get a chance to thank Superman. Clark smiles at the fourth wall.

== Cast ==
- Bud Collyer as Clark Kent / Superman
- Joan Alexander as Lois Lane
- Tedd Pierce as Conductor / Gangster
- George Lowther or Grant Richards as the Opening Narrator (unconfirmed)
