= John Sylvester White =

American actor (1919–1988)

- Born: John Sylvester White Jr. October 31, 1919; Philadelphia, Pennsylvania, United States
- Died: September 11, 1988 (aged 68); Waikiki, Hawaii, United States
- Occupation: Actor
- Years active: 1951–1952; 1970–1983
- Known for: Michael Woodman in Welcome Back, Kotter
- Spouse: Joan Alexander

John Sylvester White Jr. (October 31, 1919 – September 11, 1988) was an American actor. Best known as Mr. Michael Woodman in Welcome Back, Kotter (1975–1979).

== Early life ==
John Sylvester White was born in 1919 on Halloween in Philadelphia, Pennsylvania, but grew up in the new town of Colmar Manor, Maryland, a bedroom community suburb of northeast Washington, D.C., where his father, an attorney also of the same name, was elected the first mayor of the community in July 1927.

== Acting career ==
Before becoming known in the 1970s as the assistant principal (and later head principal) Mr. Woodman on the sitcom Welcome Back, Kotter, White had been best known for his starring role as Keith Barron, the first husband of Mary Stuart's character Joanne Gardner on the television soap opera Search for Tomorrow from 1951 to 1952. Starting in 1970, he had guest appearances on various television shows, including Kojak and Baretta, and TV movies such as The Marcus-Nelson Murders, before landing a recurring role on Welcome Back, Kotter. In 1983, he appeared as Mr. Vogelman, the proprietor of the Raytown Travel Agency in the episode titled "Mama Gets a Job" (Season 1 – Episode 7) on Mama's Family.

White married Joan Stanton, known as Joan Alexander in the 1940s when she was the voice of Lois Lane on the radio version of "The Adventures of Superman," in 1944. They later divorced. White moved to Hawaii in the early 1980s.

== Death ==
He died on September 11, 1988, from pancreatic cancer in Waikiki, Hawaii, at the age of 68.

== Selected filmography ==
Year	Title	Role	Notes
1974	The Gun	Braverman	
1975-1979 1980|| Welcome Back, Kotter	Mr. Michael Woodman	94 episodes	
1982	Mama's Family	Mr. Herbert Vogelman	1 episode “Mama Gets a Job”
1984	E. Nick: A Legend in His Own Mind	Harry	1 episode “Mama Gets a Job”
