= The Adventures of Superman (radio series) =

Long-running radio serial

- National (DC) Comics publisher Harry Donenfeld (left) with Bud Collyer and Joan Alexander
- Other names: "Superman"
- Genre: Superhero fiction; Action/adventure
- Running time: 15 min, 30 min
- Country of origin: United States
- Language: English
- Home station: WOR-AM
- Syndicates: Mutual Broadcasting System, Citadel Media
- Starring: Bud Collyer, Joan Alexander
- Announcer: Jackson Beck
- Written by: George Putnam Ludlam
- Recording studio: New York
- Original release: February 12, 1940 – March 1, 1951
- No. of episodes: 2,088
- Sponsored by: Kellogg's Pep Cereal
- Podcast: Stream from Archive.org

The Adventures of Superman is a long-running radio serial that originally aired from 1940 to 1951 featuring the DC Comics character Superman.

The serial came to radio as a syndicated show on New York City's WOR on February 12, 1940. On Mutual, it was broadcast from August 31, 1942, to February 4, 1949, as a 15-minute serial, running three or, usually, five times a week. From February 7 to June 24, 1949, it ran as a thrice-weekly half-hour show. The series shifted to ABC Saturday evenings on October 29, 1949, and then returned to afternoons twice a week on June 5, 1950, continuing on ABC until March 1, 1951. Because the series never aired any repeats, this means that in all, 2,088 original episodes of The Adventures of Superman aired on American radio.

== History ==
Created by Jerry Siegel and Joe Shuster, the Man of Steel first appeared in Action Comics #1 in 1938.

The following year, the newspaper comic strip began, and DC's press agent Allen Ducovny and former pulp fiction author Robert Joffe Maxwell developed a Superman radio series, and four audition radio episodes were prepared, first broadcast on Monday, 12 February, 1940 as a transcribed series for Hecker H-O (Hornby's Oatmeal) Company of Buffalo, New York. When Superman was first heard on radio, the title character was portrayed by Bud Collyer.

During World War II and the post-war years, the juvenile adventure radio serial, sponsored by Kellogg's Pep, was a huge success, with many listeners following the quest for "truth and justice" in the daily radio broadcasts, the comic book stories and the newspaper comic strip. Airing in the late afternoon (variously at 5:15pm, 5:30pm and 5:45pm), the radio serial engaged its young after-school audience with its exciting and distinctive opening, which changed slightly as the series progressed. Most familiar today is the television opening, which copied the radio opening from 1945 onward (save for "and the American Way" line, which was an even later addition), but the most often heard radio opening through the mid-1940s was:

Presenting the transcription feature, Superman! [followed by Superman's "flying" audio effect]
Up in the sky! Look!
It's a bird!
It's a plane!
It's Superman!
Yes, it's Superman—strange visitor from the planet Krypton who came to Earth with powers and abilities far beyond those of mortal men. Superman, who can leap tall buildings in a single bound, race a speeding bullet to its target, bend steel in his bare hands, and who, disguised as Clark Kent, mild-mannered reporter for a great Metropolitan newspaper, fights a never-ending battle for truth and justice.

By September 5, 1945, the opening (repeated at the close) had morphed into:

Faster than a speeding bullet. More powerful than a locomotive. Able to leap tall buildings in a single bound.
Look! Up in the sky!
It's a bird!
It's a plane!
It's Superman!

That opening, one of the most famous in radio history, was delivered by Jackson Beck, the announcer-narrator for the program from 1943 to 1950. He also had recurring roles, voicing an occasional tough guy and also portraying Beany Martin, the Daily Planet's teenage copy boy. On Superman episodes featuring Batman, he played Bruce Wayne's butler, Alfred Pennyworth. Decades later, Beck portrayed Perry White, Clark Kent's boss, in Filmation's The New Adventures of Superman (1966–1970), in addition to serving as the show's narrator.

Just as Superman's true identity remained a secret, the identity of Superman's radio actor also remained a secret from 1940 until 1946, when the character of Superman was used in a promotional campaign for racial and religious tolerance and Collyer did a Time magazine interview about that campaign.

Since there were no reruns at that time, the series often used plot devices and plot twists to allow Collyer to have vacation time. Kryptonite allowed Superman to be incapacitated and incoherent with pain while the secondary characters took the focus. At other times, Batman (Stacy Harris) and Robin (Ronald Liss) appeared on the program in Superman's absence.

The scripts by B. P. Freeman and Jack Johnstone were directed by Robert and Jessica Maxwell, George Lowther, Allen Ducovny and Mitchell Grayson. Sound effects were created by Jack Keane, Al Binnie, Keene Crockett and John Glennon.

Many aspects associated with Superman, such as kryptonite, originated on radio, as did certain characters, including Daily Planet editor Perry White, copy boy Jimmy Olsen and police inspector Bill Henderson. On March 2, 1945, Superman met Batman and Robin for the first time.

Paramount's animated Superman short films used the same voice actors as the radio series, and Columbia's Superman movie serials (1948, 1950) were "adapted from the Superman radio program broadcast on the Mutual Network".

=== "Clan of the Fiery Cross" ===
In 1946, Stetson Kennedy, a human rights activist, infiltrated the Ku Klux Klan and other white supremacist terrorist groups. Concerned that the organization had links to the government and police forces, Kennedy contacted the Superman producers and proposed a story where Superman battles the Klan. Looking for new villains, the producers agreed. Kennedy provided information, including details of Klan rituals, to the writers. The result was a series of episodes, "Clan of the Fiery Cross", in which Superman took on the Klan. The trivialization of the Klan's rituals and natures had a negative impact on Klan recruiting and membership numbers.

Superman historian Michael Hayde has cast doubt on whether actual KKK codewords and details were broadcast in the Clan of the Fiery Cross story arc. He wrote: "[O]ne is hard pressed to uncover anything that might be construed as proprietary to the KKK, with the exception of one – and only one – sequence, heard in episode #2".

The story-arc was loosely adapted for a DC Comics limited series, Superman Smashes the Klan by Gene Luen Yang, which was released in October 2019.

=== Narrative notes ===
In the first few episodes, Superman's home planet of Krypton is located on the far side of the sun, as opposed to a distant star system as it is in most stories. During the journey to Earth, baby Kal-El grows into an adult and emerges fully grown from his ship after it lands on Earth. He is never adopted by Jonathan and Martha Kent and immediately begins his superhero career. This was eventually retconned in later episodes to match the narrative of the comic books.

This serial introduced the fictional mineral kryptonite, the radiation from which can weaken and even (in some continuities) kill Superman. Aside from giving Superman's foes a plausible way to fight him, it also allowed Superman's voice actor to take the occasional break: Superman would spend the next episode incapacitated, his groans voiced by a substitute actor.

== Ratings ==
In January 1945, the show was listened to on 3.1% of radios. In January 1946, it was listened to on 4.4% of radios.

== Stories ==
The syndicated series, titled simply Superman, first aired via pre-recorded transcription disks over 11 stations beginning on February 12, 1940, with an origin story, "The Baby from Krypton". The series aired in 15-minute episodes three times a week until May 9, 1941, with the conclusion of the "Nitrate Shipment" storyline. By that time, it had expanded to 63 stations.

=== Start of run: February 1940 ===
The first 19 episodes had individual titles that told three overall stories:

No.	Title	Original release date
1	"The Baby from Krypton"	February 12, 1940
On the planet Krypton, scientist Jor-El warns that the planet is doomed, but his plan to build spaceships and evacuate the planet meets with jeers. Jor-El only has time to build a model spacecraft. He and his wife Lara send their infant son, Kal-El, off in the spaceship just before the planet explodes. The child is sent off on a one-way trip to the planet Earth.
2	"Clark Kent, Reporter"	February 14, 1940
Kal-El has arrived in Metropolis all grown up. He saves a young boy, Jimmy and his father but asks them to keep it a secret. The two offer him the alias, "Clark Kent", as he gets accustomed to the planet. Clark goes searching for a job at the Daily Planet, where he meets Mr. Perry White. Mr. White gets a mysterious call from a "The Wolf" and offers Clark a temporary offer to put together a story on this "Mr. Wolf" and the Silver Clipper.
3	"Keno's Landslide"	February 16, 1940
Clark has received orders to head west and investigate his assignment. Meanwhile, Keno, an assailant for "The Wolf", is discussing what their plans are, which is to paralyze the railroads. Keno is questioning whether he wants to be a part of these diabolical plans. Clark is determined to foil "The Wolf's" plan and saves the train from being pummeled by a landslide, but after saving the train, he gets the attention of "The Wolf", who is ready to meet this "Clark Kent".
4	"Kent Captured by the Wolf"	February 19, 1940
5	"Locomotive Crew Freed"	February 21, 1940
6	"The Silver Clipper" "Yellow Mask Intro-Train Switch Thrown"	February 23, 1940
7	"The Atomic Beam Machine" "Dr. Dalgrin's Atomic Beam"	February 26, 1940
8	"Fuel" "Yellow Mask Steals Fuel For Atomic Beam"	February 28, 1940
9	"Threat to the Planet Building" "Yellow Mask Throws Lois Out of Plane"	March 1, 1940
10	"Fire in the Sterling Building"	March 4, 1940
11	"The Stabbing of June Anderson" "Relative Stabs June Anderson in Hospital"	March 6, 1940
12	"North Star Mining Company"	March 8, 1940
13	"The Steamship Madison" "Bart & Joe Set Fire on Steamer Madison"	March 11, 1940
14	"Plane to Canyon City" "Kent Falls off Plane to Canyon City, Idaho"	March 13, 1940
15	"Left to be Killed" "Superman Saves June From Mine Explosion"	March 15, 1940
16	"The Prison Riot" "Prison Riot With Keno & Wolfe"	March 18, 1940
17	"The Steam Plant" "Keno & Wolfe Head for Steam Plant With Lois"	March 20, 1940
18	"The Wolf vs the Yellow Mask"	March 22, 1940
19	"The Yellow Mask Escapes" "Superman Saves Jefferson Bridge"	March 25, 1940

=== Multi-part cliffhangers: March 1940 – May 1941 ===
The series then moved to multi-part cliffhanger stories, beginning with "The Mystery of Dyerville". Some stories spanned just a few episodes; others, like "The Last of the Clipper Ships", went on for up to 20 parts.

- "The Mystery of Dyerville" (March 1940) (2 parts, actually concludes the story begun on March 18)
- "The Emerald of the Incas" (April 1940) (6 parts)
- "Donelli's Protection Racket" (April 1940) (6 parts)
- "Airplane Disasters at Bridger Field" (April–May 1940) (6 parts)
- "Buffalo Heights" (May 1940) (6 parts)
- "Alonzo Craig, Arctic Explorer" (May–June 1940) (6 parts)
- "Horace Morton's Weather Predictions" (June 1940) (6 parts)
- "Hans Holbein's Doll Factory" (June–July 1940) (6 parts)
- "Happyland Amusement Park" (July 1940) (6 parts)
- "Lighthouse Point Smugglers" (July–August 1940) (6 parts)
- "Pillar of Fire at Graves' End" (August 1940) (3 parts)
- "The Mayan Treasure" (August 1940) (6 parts)
- "Professor Thorpe's Bathysphere" (August–September 1940) (12 parts)
- "The Curse of Dead Man's Island" (September–October 1940) (6 parts)
- "The Yellow Mask and the 5 Million Dollar Jewel Robbery" (October–November 1940) (15 parts)
- "The Invisible Man" (November 1940) (6 parts)
- "The 5 Million Dollar Gold Heist" (November–December 1940) (8 parts)
- "The Howling Coyote" (December 1940–January 1941) (14 parts)
- "The Black Pearl of Osiris" (January–February 1941) (11 parts)
- "The Dragon's Teeth" (February–March 1941) (10 parts)
- "Last of the Clipper Ships" (March–April 1941) (20 parts)
- "The Nitrate Shipment" (April –May 1941) (9 parts)

=== End of run: August 1941 – February 1942 ===
Beginning on August 25, 1941, a second series of transcriptions designed to air five days per week (although many stations continued the previous three-per-week schedule) aired. These concluded after 26 weeks with the final installment of "A Mystery for Superman" airing on February 20, 1942:

- "The Grayson Submarine" (August 1941) (6 parts)
- "Dr. Deutsch and the Radium Mine" (September 1941) (12 parts)
- "The White Plague" (September 1941) (8 parts)
- "Fur Smuggling" (September–October 1941) (6 parts)
- "Dr. Roebling and the Voice Machine" (October 1941) (16 parts)
- "Metropolis Football Team Poisoned" (October - November 1941) (15 parts)
- "Crooked Oil Association" (November–December 1941) (10 parts)
- "The Silver Arrow" (December 1941) (7 parts)
- "The Pan-Am Highway" (December 1941–January 1942) (15 parts)
- "The Mechanical Man" (January 1942) (10 parts)
- "Lita the Leopard Woman" (January–February 1942) (12 parts)
- "The Ghost Car" (February 1942) (8 parts)
- "A Mystery for Superman" (February 1942) (5 parts)

In February 1942, the syndicated series ceased production. At that time, it was airing in 85 North American markets.

=== First revival: August 1942 – June 1949 ===
In June, the Mutual Network discovered it would be losing its #1 juvenile show, Jack Armstrong, the All-American Boy to NBC's Blue Network at the end of August. To counter, MBS decided to revive the show, now officially titled The Adventures of Superman, on August 31, 1942. The new series aired live, five days a week. The revival began with two individual episodes, and then returned to the cliffhanger serial format.

The stories were of varying lengths—some stories were only five parts, while others could go into the dozens. Some of the longer stories include "Looking for Kryptonite" (25 episodes), "The Hate Mongers' Organization" (25 episodes) and "Superman vs Kryptonite" (33 episodes).

All stories broadcast from August 31, 1942, to September 3, 1945, are either wholly or partially missing. For those stories where some episodes are available in circulation, it will be noted which parts are available.

- "Superman Comes to Earth" (August 31, 1942)
- "Eben Kent Dies in Fire, Clark Goes to Metropolis" (September 1, 1942)
- "The Wolfe" (September 1942) (11 parts, Parts 4, 5, and 11 available)
- "The Tiny Men" (September 1942) (9 parts, Parts 1, 2, 4, 6, and 8 available)
- "Mystery in Arabia" (September–October 1942) (10 parts, Parts 1, 3-9 available)
- "The Black Narcissus" (October 1942) (9 parts, Parts 1-7 available)
- "The Headless Indian" (October–November 1942) (18 parts, Parts 1-16 and 18 available)
- "The Midnight Intruder" (November–December 1942) (14 parts, Parts 2, 5–10, and 14 available)
- "The Lost Continent of Atlantis" (December 1942) (9 parts, parts 1–5, 7, 8 available)
- "The Mystery Ship" (December 1942) (7 parts, Parts 1, 2, 4–7 available)
- "The Tin Men" (January 1943) (15 parts, parts 2–15 available)
- "Trouble in Athabascus" (January–February 1943) (9 parts)
- "The Island of Ghost Ships" (February 1943) (11 parts)
- "The Model Plane Mystery" (February–March 1943) (17 parts)
- "Dr. Cameron's Helicopter" (March 1943) (4 parts)
- "The Vulture and the Thunderbolt Express" (March–April 1943) (16 parts, Parts 3, 4, 9 available)
- "The Bainbridge Disaster" (April 1943) (12 parts)
- "Master of the Dream World" (April–May 1943) (14 parts)
- "The Ghost Squadron" (May–June 1943) (10 parts)
- "The Meteor from Krypton" (June 1943) (7 parts, Parts 3, 4 available)
- "Society of the Flamingo" (June–July 1943) (16 parts)
- "Mr. Prim and the Dragonfly Adventure" (July 1943) (12 parts, Part 12 available)
- "The Genie in the Bottle" (July–August 1943) (8 parts)
- "The World of the Future" (August 1943) (11 parts)
- "The Civil Air Patrol" (August–September 1943) (14 parts)
- "Penrose Salvage Company" (September 1943) (8 parts)
- "The Mystery of the Death Plane" (September 1943) (4 parts)
- "Adventures in the Capitol City" (September - October 1943) (7 parts)
- "German Submarine Menace" (October 1943) (8 parts)
- "The New German Weapon" (October 1943) (11 parts, Parts 3–6 available)
- "The Mystery of Prince Philip" (October–November 1943) (14 parts)
- "Military Espionage" (November–December 1943) (16 parts)
- "Stolen War Information" (December 1943 - January 1944) (17 parts)
- "Lois and Jimmy Disappear" (January 1944) (8 parts, Part 7 available)
- "The Green Death" (January 1944) (9 parts, Part 4 available)
- "The Mystery of the $100,000 Stamp" (January–February 1944) (12 parts)
- "The Mystery of the Transport Plane Crashes" (February 1944) (6 parts)
- "Lighthouse Point" (February–March 1944) (7 parts, one episode is available, but which part it is has not been determined)
- "The Rocket Plane" (March 1944) (4 parts)
- "The Mystery of Clifftown" (March 1944) (14 parts)
- "The Golden Homing Pigeon" (March–April 1944) (21 parts, part 10 available)
- "The Mystery of Desert Springs and the Birdmen" (April - May 1944) (21 parts)
- "The Hurdy-Gurdy Man" (May–June 1944) (12 parts)
- "The North Woods Story" (June 1944) (15 parts)
- "The Seagull, North Pacific Adventure" (July 1944) (9 parts)
- "The Mystery of the Aviation Freight Lines" (July 1944) (11 parts)
- "The Society of the Crimson Robe" (July–August 1944) (11 parts)
- "Ghosts of the Air" (August 1944) (10 parts)
- "The Scorpion" (August–September 1944) (9 parts)
- "Der Teufel's Atomic Pistol" (September 1944) (13 parts, Part 4 available)
- "The Mystery of the Mummy Case" (September–October 1944) (21 parts)
- "Dr. Roebling and the Voice Machine" (October–November 1944) (14 parts)
- "Planet Utopia" (November·December 1944) (13 parts)
- "Lois' Uncle John and the Missing Plans" (December 1944) (11 parts, parts 1, 4, 11 available)
- "The Missing Santa Claus" (December 1944) (6 parts, part 2 available)
- "The Man in the Velvet Shoes" (December 1944 – January 1945) (12 parts, parts 1, 5, 6, 10-12 available)
- "The Mystery of the Sleeping Beauty" (January–February 1945) (20 parts, parts 11, 13, 14, 16-20 available)
- "The Space Shell" (February 1945) (12 parts, parts 3, 6–10 available)
- "The Mystery of the Waxmen" (March 1945) (12 parts, parts 2, 3 available)
- "The Mystery of the Golden Nail" (March 1945) (12 parts, parts 3, 4, 8 available)
- "The Ghost Car" (April 1945) (9 parts, part 7 available)
- "The Boy King of Moravia" (April 1945) (9 parts, parts 3, 7 available)
- "Lair of the Dragon" (May 1945) (14 parts, part 8 available)
- "The Mystery of the Counterfeit Money" (May 1945) (10 parts)
- "Valley of the Giants" (May–June 1945) (10 parts)
- "The Desert Adventure" (June–July 1945) (19 parts)
- "The Underseas Kingdom" (July–August 1945) (19 parts, parts 16, 17 available)
- "The Flood" (August 1945) (13 parts, parts 4-6 available)
- "The Black Market" (August–September 1945) (7 parts)

From September 4, 1945 (part 1 of "Dr. Bly's Confidence Gang") to September 2, 1948 (part 3 of "The Mystery of the Silver Buffalo") all stories are fully available in circulation except for "The Hate Mongers' Organization", "Pennies for Plunder", and "Hunger, Inc." which are all missing a handful of episodes. For these three serials, it will be specified which parts are missing.

- "Dr. Bly's Confidence Gang" (September 1945) (14 parts)
- "The Meteor of Kryptonite" (September 1945) (2 parts)
- "The Scarlet Widow" (September–October 1945) (11 parts)
- "The Atom Man" (October–November 1945) (19 parts)
- "Atom Man in Metropolis" (November–December 1945) (19 parts)
- "Looking for Kryptonite" (December 1945 – January 1946) (26 parts)
- "The Talking Cat" (January 1946) (14 parts)
- "Is There Another Superman?" (January–February 1946) (13 parts)
- "The Radar Rocket" (February–March 1946) (20 parts)
- "The Mystery of the Dragon's Teeth" (March 1946) (10 parts)
- "The Story of the Century" (April 1946) (12 parts)
- "The Hate Mongers' Organization" (April–May 1946) (25 parts, Part 6 missing)
- "Al Vincent's Corrupt Political Machine" (May–June 1946) (14 parts)
- "Clan of the Fiery Cross" (June–July 1946) (16 parts)
- "Horatio F. Horn, Detective" (July 1946) (22 parts)
- "The Secret Menace Strikes" (August 1946) (15 parts)
- "Candy Meyer's Big Story" (August–September 1946) (8 parts)
- "George Latimer, Crooked Political Boss" (September 1946) (17 parts)
- "The Dead Voice" (September–October 1946) (15 parts)
- "Counterfeit Money" (October–November 1946) (14 parts)
- "The Disappearance of Clark Kent" (November 1946) (13 parts)
- "The Secret Letter" (November–December 1946) (7 parts)
- "The Phony Song Publishing Company" (December 1946) (8 parts)
- "The Phony Housing Racket" (December 1946) (9 parts)
- "The Phony Restaurant Racket" (December 1946 – January 1947) (8 parts)
- "The Phony Inheritance Racket" (January 1947) (8 parts)
- "Drought in Freeville" (January–February 1947) (16 parts)
- "The Monkey Burglar" (February 1947) (10 parts)
- "Knights of the White Carnation" (February–March 1947) (14 parts)
- "The Man Without a Face" (March–April 1947) (16 parts)
- "Mystery of the Lost Planet" (April 1947) (13 parts)
- "The Phantom of the Sea" (April–May 1947) (12 parts)
- "Superman vs. Kryptonite" (May–June 1947) (33 parts)
- "The Secret Rocket" (September–October 1947) (19 parts)
- "The Ruler of Darkness" (October–November 1947) (24 parts)
- "Pennies for Plunder" (November–December 1947) (21 parts, Parts 19–21 missing)
- "Hunger Inc." (December 1947 – January 1948) (12 parts, Parts 1–3 missing)
- "Dead Man's Secret" (January - February 1948) (14 parts)
- "Batman's Great Mystery" (February 1948) (11 parts)
- "The Kingdom Under the Sea" (February–March 1948) (15 parts)
- "The Mystery of the Stolen Costume" (March–April 1948) (17 parts)
- "The Skin Game" (April 1948) (9 parts)
- "The Crossword Puzzle Mystery" (April–May 1948) (13 parts)
- "The Ghost Brigade" (May 1948) (11 parts)
- "The Mystery of the Sleeping Beauty" (May–June 1948) (18 parts)
- "The Secret of Meteor Island" (June–July 1948) (17 parts)
- "The Voice of Doom" (July 1948) (18 parts)
- "The Secret of the Genie" (August 1948) (10 parts)
- "The Mystery of the Letter" (August 1948) (11 parts)

The remaining serialized stories are all either wholly or partially missing. For those stories where some episodes are available in circulation, it will be noted which parts are available.

- "The Mystery of the Silver Buffalo" (August–September 1948) (11 parts, Parts 1–3, 8, 9 available)
- "The Secret of Stone Ridge" (September–October 1948) (17 parts)
- "The Mystery of the Unknown" (October–November 1948) (17 parts)
- "Murder Scores a Touchdown" (November 1948) (10 parts)
- "The Riddle of the Mystery Message" (November–December 1948) (13 parts)
- "The Vanishing Killers" (December 1948) (11 parts)
- "Superman's Secret" (December 1948) (8 parts, Part 5 available)
- "The Return of the Octopus" (December 1948 – January 1949) (16 parts)
- "The Mystery of the Spellbound Ships" (January–February 1949) (11 parts)

Beginning on February 7, 1949, The Adventures of Superman episodes expanded to 30 minutes each. All were transcribed. Each episode was self-contained and had an individual story title. Only "The Mystery of the $10,000 Ghost", "The Mystery of the Flying Monster", and "The Case of the Double Trouble" are available in circulation.

- "The Frozen Death" (February 7, 1949)
- "The Mystery of the Golden Eagle" (February 9, 1949)
- "The Riddle of the Chinese Jade" (February 11, 1949)
- "The Curse of the Devil's Creek" (February 14, 1949)
- "The Lost Civilization" (February 16, 1949)
- "The Mystery of the Voice Machine" (February 18, 1949)
- "The Mystery if the Little Men" (February 21, 1949)
- "The Story of Marina Baum" (February 23, 1949)
- "Death Rides the Roller Coaster" (February 25, 1949)
- "The Mystery of the Singing Wheels" (February 28, 1949)
- "The Case of the Poisoned Town" (March 2, 1949)
- "Mystery of the $10,000 Ghost" (March 4, 1949)
- "Mystery of the Flying Monster" (March 7, 1949)
- "Case of Double Trouble" (March 9, 1949)
- "Superman's Mortal Enemy" (March 11, 1949)
- "The Mystery of the Disappearing Diamonds" (March 14, 1949)
- "The Cat as Big as an Elephant" (March 16, 1949)
- "The Mystery of the Walking Doll" (March 18, 1949)
- "The Return of Terror" (March 21, 1949)
- "How Time Stood Still" (March 23, 1949)
- "The World's Greatest Secret" (March 25, 1949)
- "Crime by the Carload" (March 28, 1949)
- "Fangs of Fury" (March 30, 1949)
- "The Mystery of the Citadel of Doom" (April 1, 1949)
- "The Mystery of the Death Train" (April 4, 1949)
- "Terror Under the Big Top" (April 6, 1949)
- "The Man of a Thousand Faces" (April 8, 1949)
- "The Lost King" (April 11, 1949)
- "The Mystery of Skull Cave" (April 13, 1949)
- Untitled story (April 15, 1949)
- "The Secret of the Sahara" (April 18, 1949)
- "A Voice from the Grave" (April 20, 1949)
- "The Deadly Double" (April 22, 1949)
- "The Adventure of the Impractical Joker" (April 25, 1949)
- "An Experiment in Danger" (April 27, 1949)
- "The Mystery of the Phantom Fleet" (April 29, 1949)
- "The Triangle of Crime" (May 2, 1949)
- "The Mystery of the Vibrating Death" (May 4, 1949)
- "The Mystery of Butte Valley" (May 6, 1949)
- "The Eye of Balapur" (May 9, 1949)
- "The Horseman of Doom" (May 11, 1949)
- "The Mystery of the New Face" (May 13, 1949)
- "The Vengeful Ghost" (May 16, 1949)
- "The Mystery of the Flaming Forest" (May 18, 1949)
- "The Winged Horse" (May 20, 1949)
- "Death on the Diamond" (May 23, 1949)
- "The Riddle of the Tapestry" (May 25, 1949)
- "The Mystery of the Singing Wheels" (May 27, 1949)
- "The Speedway of Terror" (May 30, 1949)
- "Crime at a Bargain" (June 1, 1949)
- "The Vanishing Ships" (June 3, 1949)
- "The Case of the Double Double Cross" (June 6, 1949)
- "The Portrait of Satan" (June 8, 1949)
- "The Ghost of Shipwreck Island" (June 10, 1949)
- "Eleven for Death" (June 13, 1949)
- "Forecast for Crime" (June 15, 1949)
- "Murder on the Midway" (June 17, 1949)
- "The Borrowed Corpse" (June 20, 1949)
- "Killer at Large" (June 22, 1949)
- "The Mystery of the Frozen Monster" (June 24, 1949)

The series left MBS with the 60th half-hour show, "The Mystery of the Frozen Monster", on June 24, 1949.

=== Adult themed revival: October 1949 – January 1950 ===
It returned as a mystery program targeted toward adults on Saturday, October 29, 1949, at 8:30pm over the ABC network. ABC aired this adult-themed version for 13 weeks, concluding with "Dead Men Tell No Tales" on January 21, 1950. This broadcast marked the final radio appearance of Bud Collyer as Clark Kent/Superman.

- "Mystery of the Walking Dead" (October 29, 1949)
- "One Minute to Death" (November 19, 1949)
- "Puzzle of the Poison Pomegranate" (November 26, 1949)
- "Death Rides the Roller Coaster" (December 3, 1949)
- "Diamond of Death" (December 17, 1949)

=== Re-used scripts revival: June 1950 – March 1951 ===
On June 5, 1950, ABC revived The Adventures of Superman as a twice-weekly afternoon half-hour series. This version reused the scripts for the 60 MBS half-hour episodes and the 13 "adult" ABC episodes but with new cast members. Michael Fitzmaurice replaced Collyer as Kent/Superman, Jack Grimes replaced Jackie Kelk as Jimmy Olsen, and Ross Martin replaced Jackson Beck as narrator. A total of 78 episodes were produced, with the final broadcast, "The Mystery of the Prehistoric Monster", on March 1, 1951. By then, producer Robert Maxwell was actively preparing Adventures of Superman for television.

== Cast ==
- Superman / Kal-El / Clark Kent:
  - Bud Collyer (1940–1950)
  - Michael Fitzmaurice (1950–1951)
- Lois Lane:
  - Rolly Bester
  - Helen Choate
  - Joan Alexander
- Perry White:
  - Julian Noa
- Jimmy Olsen:
  - Jackie Kelk
  - Jack Grimes
- Batman:
  - Matt Crowley
  - Stacy Harris
  - Gary Merrill
- Robin:
  - Ronald Liss
- Inspector Henderson:
  - Matt Crowley
  - Earl George
- Jor-El:
  - Ned Wever
- Lara:
  - Agnes Moorehead
- Ro-Zan:
  - Jay Jostyn
- Professor:
  - Jay Jostyn
- Jimmy (Professor's son):
  - Junior O'Day
- The Wolfe:
  - Ned Wever
- Keno:
  - Arthur Vinton
- Railroad Conductor:
  - Julian Noa
- The Yellow Mask:
  - Julian Noa
- Dr. Dahlgren:
  - Ned Wever
- June Anderson:
  - Marian Shockley
- Bartley Pemberton:
  - Ned Wever
- Captain Anderson:
  - Frank Lovejoy
- Beany Martin (Daily Planet copyboy):
  - Jackson Beck
- Alfred Pennyworth:
  - Jackson Beck
- Narrator:
  - George Lowther (1940–1942)
  - Jackson Beck (1943–1951)
  - Ross Martin (1951)

From 1949 to 1954 there was also an Australian version of the series. This series included 1040 15-minute episodes. It was cast with Australia actors such as Leonard Teale as Superman and Margaret Christensen as Lois Lane.
