= Jackson Beck =

American actor (1912–2004)

- Born: July 23, 1912; Greenwich Village, New York, U.S.
- Died: July 28, 2004 (aged 92); Manhattan, New York, U.S.
- Years active: 1931–1994
- Known for: the voice of Bluto

Jackson Beck (July 23, 1912 – July 28, 2004) was an American actor best known as the announcer on radio's The Adventures of Superman and the voice of Bluto in the Famous era Popeye theatrical shorts.

== Early years ==
Beck was born on July 23, 1912, in Manhattan, New York. Beck's father, Max Beck, was an actor on stage and in silent film. His grandfather Joseph immigrated from Saxony, Germany and founded the distillery Joseph Beck & Sons.

Beck grew up in Greenwich Village, Manhattan.

== Radio ==
Beck's early radio experience included work at WINS and WHN, both in New York City. Beginning in 1931, he worked on Myrt and Marge, among other roles. In 1934, he was the announcer for The Adventures of Babe Ruth on the radio. In 1943, he took over as narrator of radio's The Adventures of Superman; it was Beck who intoned the familiar prologue "strange visitor from another planet..." He also had recurring roles, voicing an occasional tough guy and also portraying Beany Martin, the Daily Planet's teenage copy boy. On Superman episodes featuring Batman, he played Bruce Wayne's butler, Alfred Beagle. At the same time, he provided narration for several of the 1940s Superman animated short films.

He also impersonated Joseph Stalin and other world leaders for The March of Time radio series, starred as The Cisco Kid on radio from 1942 to 1945 and sleuth Philo Vance in a syndicated series from 1948 to 1950, starred in the dramatic anthology Brownstone Theater on Mutual, and served as narrator for the radio adventures of Tom Corbett, Space Cadet.

Beck also co-starred in several episodes of the CBS Radio Mystery Theater.

== Television ==
Beck portrayed Perry White, Clark Kent's boss in Filmation's The New Adventures of Superman animated series and was narrator as well. He was the announcer for the first season of Tom Corbett, Space Cadet on television.

== Film ==
In 1966, Beck dubbed the English voice of the judge listing Tuco's many crimes before sentencing him to death by hanging in The Good, the Bad and the Ugly, and used his deep, dramatic, modulated voice as the narrator of Woody Allen's Take the Money and Run in 1969. He also narrated the cult comedy film Cry Uncle! in 1971, and was one of the players in National Lampoon's first comedy album Radio Dinner in 1972. He was prominent as well in Allen's 1987 film Radio Days, dubbing the voice of the on-the-spot newsman.

== Animation ==
Beck had a prolific career in animation, becoming one of the regular voice actors at Famous Studios in the mid-1940s. He voiced Bluto in the Popeye cartoons, Little Lulu's father, the fox in the Baby Huey cartoons, and Buzzy the Crow, who was a foil for Katnip the Cat in a number of cartoons. Beck used a black dialect for the voice of Buzzy. He was also the voice of King Leonardo in the 1960s TV cartoon series of the same name. He also had a part in the Peanuts 1977 film Race for Your Life, Charlie Brown as the snickering cat, Brutus. He narrated the 1980s G.I. Joe animated TV series. His other voice work included network TV promos (he did a series of promos for NBC's NFL coverage for much of the 1980s), narration for sketches on Saturday Night Live, movie trailers, and commercials for everything from toys to shampoo (one of Beck's very last commercials was for Infusium Shampoo).

== Other work ==
Beck also served as a pitchman for products from Combat Roach Killer to Little Caesars Pizza (he was Caesar Jr.) In 1999, he narrated a dramatization of L. Ron Hubbard's Dr. Methuselah for NPR's radio series 2000X. Beck also did few onscreen acting roles. A notable one was as mobster Willie Saffire in the crime-based daytime soap opera The Edge of Night from 1968 to 1969.

Beck was featured announcer on the 1972 comedy record album "National Lampoon Radio Dinner".

Beck had also done some voice work for MTV, mostly for their contest advertisements.

Beck also recorded voices for children's records such as The Little Engine That Could from Diplomat Records.

In 1990, he told Newsday, “My job is to sell a carload of whatever the hell it is. . .to clean out the supermarket shelves, and get them replenished. . .I’m an advertising man, and I treat my voice as a business. People who treat it as art don’t make money.”

In 1994, Beck voiced Darrel the Fifth Fish, Hunter #2, Wickersham Guard #2, the Sneetches and Greedy Ape in Storybook Weaver, and later in 2004, remade as Storybook Weaver Deluxe (his last voice).

== Death ==
Beck died of a stroke on July 28, 2004, five days after his 92nd birthday. He is buried in Brooklyn's Mount Hope Cemetery.
