= Joan Alexander =

American actress (1915–2009)

- Born: Louise Abrass; April 16, 1915; Saint Paul, Minnesota, U.S.
- Died: May 21, 2009 (aged 94); New York City, U.S.
- Other name: Joan Stanton
- Occupation: Actress
- Years active: 1941–1968
- Spouses: John Sylvester White; Robert Crowley; Arthur Stanton
- Children: 3

Joan Alexander (born Louise Abrass; April 16, 1915 – May 21, 2009) was an American actress known for her role as Lois Lane on the radio serial The Adventures of Superman and the animated Fleischer Superman short films.

== Early life and career ==
Alexander was born in Saint Paul, Minnesota, to a Lebanese-American family. Her father died when she was three, and when her mother remarried, the family moved to Brooklyn, New York. She was sent to attend a convent school on Long Island.

She became a model and actress, and studied acting in Europe with Benno Schneider, a director in the Yiddish theater. Though Abrass later took the first name Joan after the actress Joan Crawford, the origin of the name Alexander is unknown, according to her family. An early, first marriage in 1944 to actor John Sylvester White, who became known as Principal Woodman on Welcome Back, Kotter, was also unknown to Alexander's family until two years before Alexander's death.

== Voice of Lois Lane ==
Alexander portrayed newspaper reporter Lois Lane in the superhero radio program The Adventures of Superman for more than 1,600 episodes. The series began in 1940, two years after Superman's debut in the modern-day DC Comics' Action Comics #1 (June 1938), with Lane first appearing in the seventh episode. Though most sources indicate she was not the first actress cast, Alexander was cast early in the series' run and became the radio role's signature performer.

Initially, the show, which ran through to 1951, was syndicated through the Mutual Broadcasting System's cornerstone station, WOR in New York, subsequently taken up by the Mutual network and finally to ABC. Alexander also was heard on Dimension X and Philo Vance, Against the Storm and on Perry Mason, in the first portrayal of supporting character Della Street, secretary to defense attorney Mason. She also played Althea on The Brighter Day on radio. Alexander additionally provided Lois Lane's voice in the 1940s Fleischer Studios/Paramount Pictures animated Superman shorts, though she dropped the role after the ninth short, when Famous Studios took over the series and moved production to New Jersey. She reprised the role of Lois Lane for one season of the 1966 Filmation animated series The New Adventures of Superman.

== Later life and career ==
Following her divorce from White, Alexander married surgeon Robert Crowley. Author and screenwriter Jane Stanton Hitchcock (born as Jane Crowley) is their daughter. After that second marriage ended in divorce, Alexander in 1954 or 1955 married Arthur Stanton, chairman of the Orangeburg, New York-based World-Wide Volkswagen, at the time the distributor of Volkswagen and Audi vehicles in New York, New Jersey, and Connecticut, and which helped introduce the Volkswagen Beetle to the U.S. Stanton, who died January 20, 1987, adopted Alexander and Crowley's daughter, Jane when she was 9 years old. The couple's other children were sons Adam (died 1993) and Timothy. The Stantons entertained at their Manhattan apartment on the Upper East Side and their home in East Hampton, New York; their daughter told The New York Times that author George Plimpton proposed to his future wife, Freddy Espy, at one party there, that composer Leonard Bernstein sometimes performed at the piano, and that comedy playwright Neil Simon wrote a sketch for the daughter's 21st birthday.

Alexander appeared on television as a regular panelist on the 1951–1955 ABC-TV game show The Name's the Same. She appeared on Broadway in Poor Richard by Jean Kerr in 1964.

In April 2008, Alexander filed a lawsuit against financial adviser Kenneth I. Starr, alleging the late Stanton had left Alexander a $70 million estate which, according to court paper, Starr used inappropriately and squandered.

== Death ==
Alexander died on May 21, 2009, at the age of 94 from an intestinal blockage. She was survived by her son Timothy Stanton, his wife Agnes Stanton and grandsons Liam and Conrad Stanton as well as her daughter, Jane Stanton Hitchcock.

== See also ==
- Joanne Siegel, original model for Lois Lane
