= Superman: Up, Up and Away! =

2006 Superman comic book story arc

"Up, Up, and Away!"
- Cover of Superman #650 (May 2006), art by Terry Dodson.
- Publisher: DC Comics
- Publication date: May – August 2006
- Genre: Superhero; Crossover
- Title(s): Action Comics #837-840; Superman #650-653
- Main character(s): Superman/Clark Kent; Lois Lane; Supergirl/Kara Zor-El; Lex Luthor

Creative team
- Writer(s): Geoff Johns; Kurt Busiek
- Artist(s): Pete Woods; Renato Guedes

"Up, Up, and Away!" is an eight-issue Superman story arc written by Geoff Johns and Kurt Busiek with art by Pete Woods. The story primarily features a powerless Clark Kent (having lost his powers in the climax to Infinite Crisis) using his skills as a journalist to defend Metropolis from both organized crime and Lex Luthor, newly bankrupt and disgraced due to his actions in the series 52. Gradually, however, Superman begins to regain his powers, just in time to battle the embittered Luthor as he seeks to inflict his revenge upon Metropolis with the help of stolen Kryptonian battle technology and redesigned versions of the Toyman and Kryptonite Man.

It was originally published in Action Comics #837-840 and Superman #650-653 by DC Comics from May through August 2006. This was the first One Year Later Superman story.

== Plot ==
Clark Kent (powerless after his fight with Superboy-Prime a year earlier) has enjoyed his life as a civilian. After watching a presentation on Superman in Metropolis Park, his wife Lois Lane goes to report on the trial on Lex Luthor, who is now a free man after 120 counts against him are dropped. Luthor is carrying a Sunstone crystal in his hand. Praised by Perry White for his work at the Daily Planet, Clark goes to cover the return of Intergang while, at the same time, Lois is interviewing scientist K. Russell Abernathy when an accident turns him into a new Kryptonite Man. Clark calls Supergirl through his signal watch, and she defeats Kryptonite Man. Clark later runs into Luthor who assaults Clark because of articles that ruined Lex's career and cost him his company.

In an underground laboratory, Toyman works with Luthor on the Sunstone crystal while Clark nurses his injuries. Later, he heads to Metro Square and sees several men from Intergang wearing old LexCorp battle suits. They notice Clark and open fire, until Green Lantern (Hal Jordan) and Hawkgirl save him and take care of Intergang. Once that is done, Hal and Kendra talk privately to Clark, insisting that it is time for him to get back into the game - whereupon Hal presents him with an S-shaped Green Lantern ring.

Above Lois and Clark's apartment building, Lois sees Green Lantern, Hawkgirl with Clark playing around with the ring's power. Afterwards, he gives it back to Hal, stating he is fine now and does not know if he wants to resume his career as a superhero. While Lex Luthor meets and kidnaps Metallo, to steal the kryptonite inside him, robot insects break into Stryker's Island Penitentiary. Green Lantern and Hawkgirl arrive and find the Prankster behind it all and defeat him, while the new Kryptonite Man breaks out of prison.

The next day, with Jimmy Olsen by his side, Clark is checking around in hopes of exposing Intergang's illegal activity. Luthor wants to awaken an ancient Kryptonian warship that crashed in 1938, and he and Toyman harness Kryptonite Man to use his energy to the Sunstone crystal to do so. Neutron and Radion attack Clark because he exposed Intergang. The blasts do not seem to hurt him, and racing down a subway tunnel, Clark is hit by a subway car that tosses him several yards. Thinking he is dead, the villains leave. But Clark is alive, and sees his handprint on the hull of the subway car. He is once again, more powerful than a locomotive.

Later, with his powers returning only by one third, Clark needs to master them again. Lois notices his powers have returned when she sees his hand on the hot burner. She goes to the closet and pulls out a Superman costume and says, "Go get 'em". The Puzzler attacks the Daily Planet looking for Clark Kent when Superman appears. The fight is carried down into the street where, after Puzzler is defeated, Bloodsport, Livewire, Riot, Silver Banshee and the Hellgrammite attack. When Jimmy Olsen is about to be shot, Superman goes as fast as he can and stops the bullet. He is now, again, faster than a speeding bullet.

In the heated battle, Superman defeats all of the villains, then switches back to Clark Kent as he heads to the Daily Planet. Later, above Metropolis, Superman picks up something and tries to listen in. Then, dozens of Sunstone crystals grow out from the ground, damaging surrounding buildings. As Superman saves the city, he finds Luthor inside and controlling the ancient Kryptonian warship. With Metropolis having turned its back on him, Luthor declares his intent to destroy the city.

The Sunstone crystals then form tanks and hover-craft. Captain Marvel, Green Lantern, the Justice Society of America and the Teen Titans arrive to intervene but are prevented from entering the city by an energy shield generated by Luthor's stolen ship, which he declares to be the Kryptonian flagship once commanded by General Dru-Zod. Superman goes on to damage the section of the warship that controls the remote craft with his heat, causing Luthor to release kryptonite into the ship's matrix and also to change the warship into a robot. Having enough, Superman takes all of his energy and flies at speed through the cockpit of the warship, destroying it and removing Luthor from the controls. Weakened by the kryptonite, Superman's momentum carries both himself and Luthor through the ship and high above the West River as his powers fade, causing the two to crash into the water below.

On an island in the river Luthor and the still-depowered Superman fight each other hand-to-hand. Once Luthor is unconscious, Superman passes out only to awaken with his powers returned and Luthor taken into custody again. Flying above Metropolis, the crowd cheers and thanks him for saving their lives. After returning to the Planet as Clark Kent, he changes back to Superman to do some heroic deeds and to give Jimmy Olsen a new signal watch. After signing autographs from fans, Superman takes the Sunstone crystal Luthor used and flies to the Arctic. Knowing that it contains blueprints and designs from his Kryptonian parents, Superman throws it into the landscape and watches it construct a massive citadel. Superman decides to use this as his new Fortress of Solitude.
