= Parasite (character) =

DC Comics character

- The Rudy Jones version of Parasite as seen on the cover of Superman #684. Art by Alex Ross.

Publication information
- Publisher: DC Comics
- First appearance: (Jensen) Action Comics #340 (August 1966); (Jones) Firestorm (vol. 2) #58 (April 1987); (Allstons) The Adventures of Superman #633 (December 2004); (Allen) Superman (vol. 3) #23.4 (September 2013)
- Created by: (Jensen); Jim Shooter; (Jones) John Ostrander and Joe Brozowski; (Allstons) Greg Rucka, Matthew Clark, and Andrew Lanning; (Allen) Aaron Kuder, Dan Brown

In-story information
- Alter ego: Raymond Maxwell Jensen; Rudolph "Rudy" Jones; Alexander & Alexandra Allston; Joshua Michael Allen
- Species: Metahuman
- Team affiliations: Secret Society of Super Villains; Legion of Doom; Superman Revenge Squad; Suicide Squad
- Abilities: (All): Absorption of energy, appearance, knowledge, and powers through physical contact; (Jones): DNA mimicry

Parasite is the name of several supervillains appearing in American comic books published by DC Comics. Each iteration of the character has the ability to temporarily absorb the life force, attributes, memories, and superpowers of anyone through physical touch. The best-known incarnation is Rudy Jones, who has become one of Superman's most enduring enemies and belongs to the collective of adversaries that make up his rogues' gallery.

The Rudy Jones incarnation of Parasite has been substantially adapted from the comics into multiple forms of media, most notably in the DC Animated Universe's Superman: The Animated Series and Justice League as well as the live-action TV series Smallville and Supergirl, portrayed by Brendan Fletcher and William Mapother respectively. Additionally, Raymond Jensen and Ally Allston appear in Supergirl and Superman & Lois, portrayed by Anthony Konechny and Rya Kihlstedt respectively.

== Publication history ==
The Raymond Maxwell Jensen version of Parasite first appeared in Action Comics #340 (August 1966) and was created by Jim Shooter. Shooter, who began working for DC at age 13, says that his inspiration for the villain was learning about parasites in his ninth-grade biology class.

As of 2026, artist Al Plastino can be found listed as the character's co-creator. Shooter addressed the issue, and his process at DC at the time, in a 2016 email to writer Stephen Sonneveld:

Pet peeve: I did not "co-create" the Parasite. I designed the character visually and every other way. No one helped. But how would you know? The credits say otherwise, of course...

It's even more annoying because I supplied character designs and comprehensive layouts for that (and every) story done for DC. Nonetheless, whoever did the finished art is my "co-creator." Sigh.

Curt Swan, Al Plastino and the rest do not need their resumes padded. They're Hall of Fame on their own merits.

The Rudy Jones version of Parasite first appeared in Firestorm (vol. 2) #58 and was created by John Ostrander and Joe Brozowski.

The Alexander and Alexandra Allston versions of Parasite first appeared in The Adventures of Superman #633 and were created by Greg Rucka, Matthew Clark, and Andrew Lanning.

The Joshua Allen version of the New 52 Parasite first appeared in Superman (vol. 3) #23.4 and was created by Aaron Kuder.

== Fictional character biography ==
=== Raymond Maxwell Jensen ===
Cover to Action Comics #340, art by Curt Swan

In pre-Crisis continuity, Raymond Jensen is a lowlife who gets a job as a plant worker for a research center. Wrongly believing that the company payrolls are hidden in storage containers, Jensen opens one and was bombarded with energies from biohazard materials (which was actually waste collected by Superman when he traveled into outer space), transforming him into a purple-skinned, parasitic entity. Any time he touched someone, he could absorb their physical and mental properties. Touching Superman would instantly absorb a sizable fraction of his powers (it was established early on that he is not capable of acquiring the whole of Superman's powers). On one occasion, while attempting to absorb a greater portion of his adversary's powers than previously, his body disintegrated for a period of time due to the pressure in his cells. Despite these abilities, Parasite became depressed because he could no longer embrace his wife and children. Despite this, he had knowledge of his foe's alter ego and often used this to attack Clark Kent. Gaining sizable intellect from his multiple encounters with Superman, Parasite devised the means to reanimate dormant plant remains left behind from the Earth-Two supervillain Solomon Grundy, creating a newer and stronger version of the creature to plague his adversary. On another occasion, Parasite devised the means to temporarily transfer the powers of the hero Air Wave to Air Wave's adversary Casey Jones.

=== Rudy Jones ===
Cover to Action Comics #715, art by Kieron Dwyer

Originally a menial slacker, Rudy Jones is transformed into Parasite while working as a janitor at a Pittsburgh S.T.A.R. Labs facility. Unknown to anyone, Darkseid manipulates Jones into exposing himself to radioactive waste, transforming him into Parasite. Jones gains the ability to absorb the life energy of other people, which he requires to sustain his body. Parasite joins the Suicide Squad in confronting Firestorm, who is attempting to make the United States and the Soviet Union give up their nuclear weapons on behalf of a terminally ill Martin Stein.

Throughout his appearances, Parasite's abilities evolve, giving him the ability to absorb fire, electricity, and consciousnesses, and mimic the genetic makeup and appearance of others. However, he is forced to absorb energy more frequently to stay alive.

After escaping from S.T.A.R. Labs, Parasite formulates a plan to get back at Superman. After absorbing Lois Lane's knowledge and learning Superman's secret identity, Parasite plans to emotionally break Superman by posing as Lois. Just as Parasite is about to lay the final blow to Superman, he is stricken with kryptonite poisoning that he had drained from Superman, unbeknownst to either of them. Parasite dies before he can tell Superman Lois' whereabouts. In Justice League of America, Parasite resurfaces in St. Roch, Louisiana, where he uses his abilities to temporarily neutralize the powers of villains for a fee so they can evade detection.

The 2009-10 miniseries Superman: Secret Origin redefines Parasite's origin. In this version, Rudy Jones is an overweight janitor at the Daily Planet who is selected for a contest held by Lexcorp to have whatever he wants for the day. Jones is offered free donuts, unaware that Lex Luthor has infused one of them with Kryptonite radiation to see how it affects humans. Upon eating the infused donuts, Jones's physical body is mutated into Parasite.

In the DC Rebirth relaunch, Parasite is a member of the Suicide Squad. In Dawn of DC, Parasite reforms, is employed at Supercorp, and is given a special wristband that supplies him with energy. He also develops the ability to create small duplicates of himself and adopts one of them as a pet. Parasite is later seemingly killed by Doomsday, but absorbs part of Doomsday's energy, which allows him to survive.

=== Alexander and Alexandra Allston ===
Cover to The Adventures of Superman #635, art by J.H. Williams III

After the villain Ruin (who was secretly Professor Hamilton) performed some experiments, two new Parasites debuted, one purple, the other green. The two new Parasites were teenagers named Alex (the green Parasite) and Alexandra (the purple Parasite) who wanted to seek vengeance on the people who made their lives difficult. They were soon subdued by Superman after a battle.

Alexander is later killed by an OMAC while attempting to escape prison. Alexandra successfully escapes and joins the Secret Society of Super Villains under Alexander Luthor Jr.

=== Joshua Allen ===
In 2011, The New 52 rebooted the DC Comics universe. Joshua Michael Allen was a misanthropic delivery boy who was caught in the middle of a battle between Superman and a giant parasite. Allen snapped and attacked the creature, electrocuting it and himself with a live wire. While at S.T.A.R. Labs to check his health from the encounter, their testing transformed him into a creature who constantly feels hunger for energy he obtains from people, leaving their molded skeletons. Tired of this kind of life, he tried to commit suicide and was rescued by Superman, from whom Allen absorbed energy like never before. This eased the pain and hunger he experienced, until his energy was depleted. Allen was imprisoned in Belle Reve.

In later appearances, Allen joins the Secret Society of Super Villains and the Suicide Squad.

== Powers and abilities ==
All incarnations of Parasite can temporarily absorb the life energy, superpowers, and knowledge of their victims through physical contact, and are also able to drain virtually any other form of energy and use it as a power source.

In particular, Rudy Jones is granted enhanced strength, intelligence, agility, durability, and reflexes by absorbing the energy of other beings. When Jones drains other superpowered individuals, he gains their abilities for a limited period of time until he "runs out of life-energy" and must seek a new victim to "feed on". He is shown to have a heightened sense of perception that allows him to detect the life force and power within other beings. While drawing the energy of ordinary humans is almost instantaneous, it takes a notably longer time in the case of immensely powerful beings, which gives the victim more time to react and free themselves from Parasite's grip. Following an encounter with the Strange Visitor, however, Parasite's powers were enhanced and enable him to retain the energy he takes for longer as well as granting Jones the ability to shapeshift; he can now physically morph into his victims right down to their DNA, being able to access their memories, gain their natural abilities, and mimic their voices. Parasite's biggest weakness is that he also absorbs the weaknesses of his victims and cannot counter such susceptibilities even when he has other abilities that should do so; when he absorbed both Superman and Livewire's powers, he retained the latter's vulnerability to water despite possessing the former's near-invulnerability. Parasite also maintains Superman's weaknesses, like kryptonite, even when Parasite in addition already absorbed the powers of non-Kryptonians.

== Other versions ==
- An alternate universe version of Parasite appears in All-Star Superman.
- An unidentified alternate universe version of Parasite appears in JSA: The Liberty Files. This version is a former KGB agent and freelance contract killer.
- The Raymond Jensen incarnation of Parasite appears in Justice as a member of the Legion of Doom.
- An alternate universe version of Raymond Jensen / Parasite appears in Kingdom Come. He ruptures Captain Atom's outer shell, causing a massive nuclear explosion that kills them both and irradiates Kansas.
- An original, alternate universe version of Parasite appears in Just Imagine.... This version is Lucinda Radama, an African-American female serial killer.
- An alternate universe version of Raymond Jensen / Parasite appears in Superman: Earth One. This version has a sister named Theresa Jensen, who believes that he is a consultant with a real estate firm and is unaware of his criminal status.
- An original incarnation of Parasite, Otis, appears in Superman Family Adventures.
- An unidentified alternate universe version of Parasite appears in Superman: Red Son.
- An alternate universe version of Rudy Jones / Parasite appears in Superman American Alien.
- An alternate universe version of Parasite appears in Absolute Superman. This version, Project Parasite, is an experiment created and released by the Lazarus Corporation, turning into a giant monster as it absorbs people.

== In other media ==
=== Television ===
==== Live-action ====
- The Rudy Jones incarnation of Parasite appears in the Smallville episode "Injustice", portrayed by Brendan Fletcher. This version was a metahuman prisoner at the Black Creek facility before Tess Mercer stages a prison break and recruits Jones, among other prisoners, into a team in a failed attempt at making them heroes.
  - Additionally, an unrelated character called Eric Summers appears in the episodes "Leech" and "Asylum", portrayed by Shawn Ashmore. Throughout his appearances, he temporarily steals Clark Kent's powers via Kryptonite and electricity on two separate occasions, only to be defeated by him and lose them each time.
- Two incarnations of Parasite appear in Supergirl. Both versions are the result of humans being possessed by an alien parasite called an Angon:
  - Dr. Rudy Jones appears in the episode "Changing", portrayed by William Mapother. This version is an environmental scientist who is infected by an Angon that had laid dormant in an Arctic wolf's corpse and gains the ability to drain life force through physical contact. While fighting Supergirl, Alex Danvers, and Martian Manhunter, Jones absorbs Supergirl and Manhunter's powers and transforms into a monster before Supergirl overloads and kills him with plutonium.
  - Raymond Jensen appears in the fourth season, portrayed by Anthony Konechny. This version is a Department of Extranormal Operations (DEO) agent who despises aliens for wreaking havoc on National City. Throughout the episodes "American Alien" and "Parasite Lost", he leaves the DEO to join anti-alien activists Otis and Mercy Graves and Agent Liberty. Jensen later volunteers to be exposed to an Angon obtained from the DEO, gaining energy-absorbing abilities in the process, only to eventually end up comatose and taken into DEO custody.
- A character based on Alexandra Allston named Ally Allston appears in the second season of Superman & Lois, portrayed by Rya Kihlstedt as an adult and by Amber Taylor as a child. This version is a cult leader behind the Inverse Society who took over Bizarro World with help from her Bizarro counterpart (also portrayed by Kihlstedt), who she later merges with, gaining flight and the ability to drain energy. Nonetheless, they are defeated and separated by Superman and incarcerated by the Department of Defense.

==== Animation ====
- An original incarnation of Parasite named I.C. Harris appears in The New Adventures of Superman episode "The Pernicious Parasite". This version is a balding thief who specializes in stealing radioactive materials and lacks purple skin.
- The Raymond Jensen incarnation of Parasite appears in the Young Justice episode "Performance", voiced by Adam Baldwin.
- The Rudy Jones incarnation of Parasite appears in the Justice League Action episode "Power Outage", voiced by Max Mittelman. This version sports a more monstrous appearance and the additional ability to sprout tentacles from his torso.
- The Rudy Jones incarnation of Parasite makes non-speaking cameo appearances in Harley Quinn and Kite Man: Hell Yeah! as a member of the Legion of Doom.
- An original incarnation of Parasite appears in My Adventures with Superman. This version is a cybernetic armor called the Parasite 1.0, which was created and worn by Anthony Ivo (voiced by Jake Green) and is capable of growing larger and more monstrous in appearance as it absorbs energy.

===== DC Animated Universe =====
Rudy Jones / Parasite as he appears in the DC Animated Universe.

Two incarnations of Parasite appear in series set in the DC Animated Universe (DCAU):

- The Rudy Jones incarnation of Parasite appears in Superman: The Animated Series, voiced by Brion James. This version is a S.T.A.R. Labs janitor who gained his abilities from exposure to stolen chemicals that were originally intended to boost the rate of energy absorption in humans. He goes on to battle Superman on two occasions and briefly join forces with Livewire before ending up in a coma and being remanded to Stryker's Island.
- Jones appears in the Justice League two-part episode "Secret Society", voiced by Brian George. Having recovered from his coma, he is recruited into Gorilla Grodd's Secret Society and fights the Justice League, only to be defeated by Wonder Woman.
- Jones makes cameo appearances in Justice League Unlimited as a member of Grodd's expanded Secret Society before he is killed by Darkseid.
  - A monstrous, unidentified incarnation of Parasite appears in the episode "Epilogue", voiced by Marc Worden. This version is a member of a future version of the Society called the Iniquity Collective.

=== Film ===
- The Rudy Jones incarnation of Parasite makes a cameo appearance in Superman/Batman: Public Enemies.
- An unidentified Parasite, based on the All-Star Superman incarnation, appears in All-Star Superman (2011), voiced by Michael Gough.
- The Rudy Jones incarnation of Parasite appears in Superman: Man of Tomorrow, voiced by Brett Dalton. This version is a decorated former U.S. Marine, a veteran of the Middle East, and a loving family man who gained his abilities from exposure to an energy-absorbing biological weapon developed by S.T.A.R. Labs. Over the course of the film, Jones transforms into a massive, near-mindless beast as he absorbs energy until Superman appeals to his humanity, leading him to sacrifice himself to protect Metropolis from an exploding energy plant.

=== Video games ===
- The Rudy Jones incarnation of Parasite appears as a boss in Superman: Shadow of Apokolips, voiced again by Brian George.
- An unidentified Parasite appears as a boss in Superman 64. This version is a member of the Superman Revenge Squad.
- An unidentified Parasite appears as a boss in the Nintendo DS version of Superman Returns.
- The Rudy Jones incarnation of Parasite appears in DC Universe Online, voiced by Robert Faires. Additionally, weaker versions of Parasite called "Leeches" appear as well.
- The Rudy Jones incarnation of Parasite appears as a character summon in Scribblenauts Unmasked: A DC Comics Adventure.
- The Rudy Jones incarnation of Parasite makes a cameo appearance in Injustice: Gods Among Us via the Stryker's Island stage.
- The Rudy Jones incarnation of Parasite appears as a playable character in Lego Batman 3: Beyond Gotham, voiced by Travis Willingham.
- The Rudy Jones incarnation of Parasite appears as a playable character in Lego DC Super-Villains, voiced by Eric Bauza.

=== Miscellaneous ===
- An amalgamated incarnation of Parasite appears in Injustice: Gods Among Us: Year Five #3. This version is identified as Joshua Allen and resembles Rudy Jones. He battles Cyborg and Yellow Lantern until Superman arrives and throws Parasite into the sun.
- The Rudy Jones incarnation of Parasite appears in DC Super Hero Girls, voiced by Tom Kenny.

== See also ==
- List of Superman enemies
