= Superman: Shadow of Apokolips =

2002 video game

- North American PS2 cover art
- Developer: Infogrames Sheffield House
- Publisher: Infogrames (Note: Released under the Atari brand name)
- Producer: David Abrams
- Designer: Michael Traquair
- Programmer: Ian Badcoe
- Artist: Mark Sweeney
- Composer: Red Mustard Productions
- Platforms: PlayStation 2, GameCube
- Release: PlayStation 2: NA: September 24, 2002; EU: November 15, 2002; AU: November 22, 2002; GameCube: NA: March 26, 2003; EU: May 2, 2003
- Genre: Action-adventure
- Mode: Single-player

Superman: Shadow of Apokolips is a video game released in 2002 for the PlayStation 2 and GameCube consoles. It was developed by Infogrames Sheffield House, published by Infogrames under the Atari brand name, and released in conjunction with Warner Bros. Interactive Entertainment and DC Comics. It is based on the television series Superman: The Animated Series.

== Plot ==
Believing Intergang to be starting up again, Superman learns that beings causing chaos throughout Metropolis are a group of robots using Intergang's old methods. These "Interbots" have access to high-grade weaponry, which is powerful enough to injure or even kill Superman. These bots are commanded by Lex Luthor, who is secretly working with Darkseid.

Finding that the weapons come from Apokolips, Superman sets out to destroy the robots, and their weapons, having to fight a multitude of enemies that Luthor sends after him. Parasite, Metallo, and Livewire contracted to kill Superman to allow the bots free rein to obey Luthor's wishes.

== Development and release ==
In September 2000, Infogrames acquired the license to publish and develop Superman video games from Titus Interactive under a new deal with Warner Bros. Interactive Entertainment.

At E3 2002, Infogrames revealed Shadow of Apokolips as a PlayStation 2 title, based on Superman: The Animated Series, alongside its unrelated Xbox companion game Superman: The Man of Steel, which was based on the comic books.

The game featured designs reflecting the look and feel of Superman: The Animated Series. The story was advanced by cutscenes featuring cel-shaded animation that emulates traditional animation. The series' voice cast reprised their roles for the game, featuring Tim Daly as Superman, Dana Delany as Lois Lane, Lori Petty as Livewire, Malcolm McDowell as Metallo, Michael York as Kanto, and Clancy Brown as Lex Luthor. Kevin Michael Richardson and Brian George respectively replace Michael Ironside and the late Brion James as Darkseid and Parasite.

Infogrames published a GameCube port of the game in March 2003. The GameCube version, also handled by Infogrames Sheffield House, includes three selectable difficulty settings, Widescreen, Progressive Scan and Dolby Pro Logic II support, cheat codes, a free-roam mode, enhanced boss AI, and a "making of" movie featuring the game's development and beta elements.

== Reception ==
Reception

Aggregate scores
Aggregator	Score
GameRankings	(PS2) 65.46% (GC) 64.37%
Metacritic	(GC) 66/100 (PS2) 64/100

Review scores
Publication	Score
AllGame	3/5
Electronic Gaming Monthly	6.8/10
Game Informer	(PS2) 7/10 (GC) 6.5/10
GamePro	3/5
GameSpot	(PS2) 6.4/10 (GC) 6.2/10
GameSpy	(PS2) 3/5 (GC) 2/5
GameZone	6.9/10
IGN	(PS2) 7/10 (GC) 6.5/10
NGC Magazine	(NGC) 60/100
Nintendo Power	(NGC) 3.2/5
Official U.S. PlayStation Magazine	3.5/5
Entertainment Weekly	C−
PlayStation World	(PS2) 3/10

Superman: Shadow of Apokolips received "mixed or average" reviews, according to review aggregator website Metacritic. Prior to release, an air of apprehension surrounded the title due to the failure of Superman (1999). GameSpot praised the game's presentation, saying "...the Man of Steel has never looked or moved better", while panning the mechanics behind the game: "He's faster than a speeding bullet, able to leap tall buildings in a single bound, and can be trapped in walls because of poor collision detection: He's Superman!" IGN felt it was the superior title to the Xbox counterpart, Superman: The Man of Steel, but calling it an "average superhero game". Entertainment Weekly, however, gave the game a C− and wrote: "What keeps the game from taking off is the overly simplistic episodic nature of the missions set before you...The wacky control configuration also makes your heat vision, ice breath, X-ray vision, and superspeed incredibly difficult to use on the fly".

GameRankings gave the game a score of 65.46% for the PlayStation 2 version and 64.37% for the GameCube version, while Metacritic gave it a score of 64 out of 100 for the PS2 version and 66 out of 100 for the GameCube version.
