= Riot (DC Comics) =

Riot is the name of two different characters appearing in American comic books published by DC Comics.

== Publication history ==
The Frederick von Frankenstein incarnation of Riot first appeared in Superman: The Man of Steel #61 and was created by Louise Simonson.

== Fictional character biographies ==
=== New Titans Riot ===
The first Riot debuted in The New Titans #98 (June 1993), and was created by Marv Wolfman and Tom Grummett. She is a minor enemy of the Teen Titans who temporarily joins the team when the public turns against them.

=== Frederick Von Frankenstein ===
Riot

Publication information
- Publisher: DC Comics
- First appearance: Superman: The Man of Steel #61 (October 1996)
- Created by: Louise Simonson

In-story information
- Alter ego: Frederick von Frankenstein
- Species: Metahuman
- Abilities: Self-duplication

Frederick von Frankenstein is the last of a long line of scientists in his family. His father puts tremendous pressure on him to succeed in school and in the lab. The sheer volume of work proves too much for one man, so Frederick uses his uncle Hal's Phase Shifter to clone himself. he duplication process activates Frederick's metagene, giving him innate self-duplication abilities and a skeleton-like face. Frederick's duplicates deprive him of sleep, causing him to have insomnia. He is soon driven insane and turns to a life of crime under the alias of Riot.

Later, Riot accepts Morgan Edge's offer to join the Superman Revenge Squad alongside Maxima, Misa, Barrage, and Anomaly. Despite the team's bickering, they manage to beat Superman to a stand-still. The Superman Revenge Squad quickly fell apart when all the members realized that Edge is unable to fulfill all the promises he made to them. Edge ensured Riot's loyalty by keeping one clone of him behind, shackled with a device that prevented the others from reuniting with him. Riot frees the clone and escapes while Superman defeats the Squad.

Riot appears alongside Roxy Rocket and Doctor Phosphorus as part of an event arranged by Roulette to see who can defeat Batman. Batman, Robin, and Batgirl defeat all of the villains, rendering the bet void.

=== The New 52 ===
Following DC's 2011 relaunch of its titles, a different version of Riot (with powers similar to von Frankenstein's) appeared in The Green Team: Teen Trillionaires. This version of the character was established as Commodore Murphy's father, who used his son for genetic harvesting in order to gain superpowers, though he was sabotaged by his billionaire partner Bellachek Temple. His real name was not revealed in the course of the series.

== Powers and abilities ==
The Frederick von Frankenstein incarnation of Riot is a metahuman with the ability to clone himself at will or when attacked. The force of a blow delivered to one duplicate is dispersed across all of his currently-active clones, giving them a degree of enhanced durability.

== In other media ==
- The Frederick von Frankenstein incarnation of Riot makes a cameo appearance in Superman/Batman: Public Enemies.
- The Frederick von Frankenstein incarnation of Riot appears in Superman Returns, voiced by Peter Lurie.
- The Frederick von Frankenstein incarnation of Riot appears as a character summon in Scribblenauts Unmasked: A DC Comics Adventure.
