= Metallo =

DC Comics character

- The John Corben version of Metallo as depicted in Superman: Man of Tomorrow #14 (August 2020—digital). Art by Paul Pelletier.

Publication information
- Publisher: DC Comics
- First appearance: Action Comics #252 (May 1959)
- Created by: Robert Bernstein (writer); Al Plastino (artist)

In-story information
- Alter ego: John Corben
- Species: Human cyborg
- Team affiliations: Legion of Doom; Secret Society of Super Villains; United States Army; Superman Revenge Squad; Injustice League
- Notable aliases: Metal Zero (Metal-0)
- Abilities: Current: Bionic surgery: Superhuman strength, speed, stamina, and durability; Kryptonite power source; Imperviousness to pain; Hologram projection; Immortality; Former: Cyborg physiology: Interchangeable kryptonite; Computer interaction; Energy signature manipulation; Technomorphing; Computer brain; Immovability; Invulnerability; Laser vision; Radiation blasts; Mechanical engineering; Technological regeneration

Metallo (/məˈtæloʊ/) is the name of several supervillains appearing in American comic books published by DC Comics, commonly as an adversary of Superman. All versions of the character are powered by kryptonite and are partially or completely mechanical.

In 2009, Metallo was ranked as IGN's 52nd-greatest comic book villain of all time.

Metallo has been adapted into numerous media outside comics, primarily in association with Superman. Malcolm McDowell, Lex Lang, Jim Rash, Paul Blackthorne, and John C. McGinley have voiced the character in animation. Furthermore, several versions of Metallo appear in the live-action series Supergirl.

== Publication history ==
There was an earlier "Metalo" who appeared in World's Finest #6 (Summer 1942). This version was a man named George Grant who discovered the most powerful metal on Earth and invented a strength serum.

John Corben and Metallo first appeared in the Superman comic strip storyline "The Menace of Metallo", which ran from 15 December 1958 to 4 April 1959. The character debuted in comic books in Action Comics #252 (May 1959), in a story by Robert Bernstein and Al Plastino.

The Roger Corben version of Metallo debuted in Superman #310 and was created by Curt Swan and Martin Pasko.

== Fictional character biography ==
=== George Grant ===
The George Grant version of Metallo as seen on the cover of Superman Family #217 (April 1982). Artwork by Rich Buckler (pencils) and Dick Giordano (inks).

Metalo (alternate spelling) is the identity of an inventor/scientist named George Grant who had built a powered suit of armor made from "the most powerful metal on Earth" as well as a "strength serum" that made him a near-match for Superman. To draw him out, Metalo captured Lois Lane. At the end of their battle, Metalo fell into a crevice to what Superman assumed would be his death. Metalo was revealed to the reader to have "narrowly escaped destruction" and vowed to take revenge.

Nearly 40 years would pass before the character reappeared in print to challenge Superman again. Metalo had improved his armor and serum and also exposed Superman to a ray that reduced his power significantly, giving Metalo superior strength in their first battle. Superman engaged in a lengthy regimen of exercise and training to restore his powers and returned to easily defeat Metalo.

=== Kryptonian robot ===
A robot named Metallo built by Kryptonian scientists aided Superboy when he was marooned on an asteroid.

=== John Corben ===
John Corben's Metallo as drawn by John Byrne in Superman (vol. 2) #1 (January 1987)

John Corben was originally a journalist (and secretly a thief and murderer) who committed what he believed to be the perfect murder. While fleeing from the scene of the crime, he suffered a near-fatal accident that mangled his body beyond repair. An elderly scientist, Professor Vale, encounters Corben and transfers his brain into a robotic body covered by a flesh-like artificial skin. Corben discovered that his power source, a capsule of uranium, would only last one day, but was told by Vale that kryptonite would provide him an indefinite power supply.

After obtaining a job with the Daily Planet, Corben briefly tried to romance Lois Lane, while deciding that he would use his powers to eliminate Superman, the one person who might expose his criminal deeds. After setting a kryptonite death-trap for Superman, Corben stole what he thought was another sample of kryptonite from a museum as a new power supply, not knowing it was a fake prop; this mistake caused him to die just as he was about to kill Lois Lane for discovering that he was not Superman (as he had pretended to be, being super-strong and invulnerable as a cyborg). Superman eventually escaped from the kryptonite trap and arrived just after Metallo (John Corben) had died.

After John Byrne rewrote Superman's origins in the 1986 miniseries The Man of Steel, Metallo was given an altered backstory. In this version, Corben is inspired to battle Superman because Vale believes him to be an invader.

Despite ignoring Vale's commands, Metallo came into conflict with Superman on various occasions, largely due to his continued activities as a petty thug. Metallo later lost his kryptonite heart to Lex Luthor, though back-up life support systems allowed him to reactivate himself and escape. He remained a thorn in Superman's side and was powerful enough to cripple the Doom Patrol. Metallo later received a major upgrade via a bargain with the demon Neron. As a result, Metallo could morph his body into any mechanical shape he could imagine (such as turning his hands into guns or "growing" a jet pack from his back) and project his consciousness into any technological or metallic device. He could also grow to monstrous size. During one battle, his gigantic fists were separated and later turned into housing by other superheroes. In another incident, Metallo was rendered more insane by the Joker and used his height to destroy an elevated train of commuters.

==== Superman: Secret Origin ====
In the 2009–10 miniseries Superman: Secret Origin, which retells the origins of Superman and his supporting cast, Metallo is Sgt. John Corben and serves under Lois Lane's father, General Sam Lane. Lane is trying to push his daughter, Lois into a relationship with Corben. Though they had one date, she does not return his feelings for her. Corben is next seen signing up for a military option to neutralize Superman (ostensibly with the help of a power suit built by LexCorp). However, in his first encounter with Superman, a stray bullet hits the kryptonite rock inside the suit, generating a cascade of energy that nearly kills Corben. Through the efforts of Lex Luthor and a crack team of scientists, Corben survives as a cyborg, with the kryptonite functioning as his heart. Driven by a hatred for Superman, he became the villain known as Metallo. Metallo, now wearing a green, orange and red armor, attacks Superman again in a rampage which endangered not only the citizens of Metropolis, but his own fellow soldiers. He was defeated by Superman once more.

==== The New 52 ====
In September 2011, The New 52 rebooted DC's continuity. In this new timeline, John Corben is under the command of General Sam Lane. General Lane tells him to talk to Lois Lane, when she keeps questioning where Superman is. It is implied that Corben and Lois once had a relationship. When Superman escapes from the military's custody, Corben is seen enlisting in what appears to be a military project co-opted by Lex Luthor, General Lane, and young scientist Dr. John Henry Irons—"Project Steel Soldier"—to go against Superman. Corben is seen in the experimental Metal-Zero/"Metal 0" suit with scientists, mostly Irons, trying to help him. He continues believing that he did it for the affection of Lois and when the robotic needles are in his head, Coined "Metallo", he takes control and his heart bursts, then screams "Where is Superman?" Although the attack on Superman succeeds, Metallo is revealed to have been subverted by Brainiac as part of his own plans, and his rampage is defeated when Irons uses an armored suit of his own to fight Corben and upload a computer virus that he designed in the event of such a situation. After escaping, and still under Brainiac's control, Corben continued to fight Superman until he was able to reason with Metallo and to fight Brainiac's influence because of his feelings for Lois Lane. In doing so, Corben attacked Brainiac until Superman could defeat the villain, but he subsequently fell into a coma and was taken back by the army.

It was revealed during the "Forever Evil" storyline that the armor was keeping him alive thanks to alien technology, but without a heart he would soon die. General Lane told his scientists to find a way to save him since he helped to save Metropolis. He was later given a kryptonite heart to keep him alive since it was the only energy compatible with his cybernetics. After 31 months in a vegetative state, Corben was brought back with a shard of kryptonite to active duty in the U.S. Army. Since his actions caused the deaths of hundreds of civilians, Lane tried to kill him by exploding the plane he was being carried in. He survived and sought vengeance against Lane at his base, only to be confronted by an upgraded soldier like himself "Metal-2.0". When Corben proves too much, Metal-2.0 activates his self-destruct mechanism, hoping to destroy Corben along with himself. However, he is saved by the Scarecrow and offered a place in the Secret Society of Super Villains, now calling himself Metallo. Ultraman later rips off his kryptonite heart, because of his addiction to the mineral.

Corben was eventually seen again incarcerated in John Henry's isolated super-prison, eventually drafted by the U.S. government again shortly afterwards, but is only brought back into their service by compunction from Lois once more (who was secretly under Brainiac's influence). Given the present danger he represents as Doomsday was taking him over, Lois convinced Metallo to run Superman down in a kryptonite bombing run and was summarily incinerated by the blast; all that was left of him being the Metal Zero exo-mantel fused to his charred remains. Lois, now completely subsumed by the Brainiac consciousness inside of her, is able to recreate Corben's essential self by downloading her memory of the man he was into what's left of the old Metal-0 suit, said facsimile of the now-deceased military sergeant a loyal echo of whom he once was, obedient to Lane's every whim. He would serve as her bodyguard while Brainiac's influence compelled her to cripple military defense systems around the world. He would immediately switched sides once Lois is freed from Brainiac's control, however, and aided her in combating the extraterrestrial threat to their world. As Superman and Lois departed to stop Brainiac, Metallo was left on Earth to defend Metropolis in their stead. After the crisis is resolved, Corben is seen standing guard over Metropolis with Krypto, seemingly contented with his current position.

In the wake of Superman's identity being outed to the world as the hero began losing his powers, many an investigation was undertaken into his identity, contacts and motives by collective interests. Seeing as her life was in more danger than ever before, Metallo stuck close to his love as she went and did some investigating of her own in the meantime. While Vandal Savage made his play for ultimate power, Lois and Metallo were close by on the scene where Superman kept his warship from crushing a small town. While aiding Superman, as Lois refused to leave his side during the battle with Savage's empowered progeny, Metallo's bionic shell was badly damaged. Looking to make good with all the bad in his life, he willingly offered his kryptonite heart to Superman (the depowered hero having discovered a treatment for his loss of powers that essentially involved giving himself chemotherapy with kryptonite), knowing that he will not survive without it.

==== DC Rebirth ====
In DC Rebirth, Metallo appears alive as a member of the Superman Revenge Squad alongside General Zod, Mongul, Cyborg Superman, the Eradicator, and Blanque. After Superman is temporarily blinded, they are defeated when Lex Luthor, Supergirl, Superwoman, Kong Kenan, and Steel come to Superman's aid and Zod betrays the team for his own ends.

=== Roger Corben ===
Roger Corben is John Corben's brother, who works with the secret organization SKULL to avenge his death.

== Powers and abilities ==
Metallo's metallic body offers him a high degree of protection from physical and energy attacks. He has enhanced abilities and no longer needs to eat, sleep, or breathe. His brain is hermetically sealed inside a shielded alloy skull that has its own power supply. When he was first created, he was powered by a kryptonite heart; losing that, he subsisted on plutonium instead. Additionally, because of his cyborg body, Metallo possesses superhuman strength and speed, enough to pose a challenge and even a threat to opponents such as Superman (in that case, he also takes advantage of the weakening power of kryptonite besides his own strength).

Over the course of his criminal career, Metallo's body would be decimated constantly by various circumstances. As such he would receive numerous upgrades or whole new chassis' to replace his damaged parts, such as by the obscure supervillain organization Cerberus, which modified him with a vastly superior body, one with lead-lined skull-plating and an anatomic layer that even Superman could not demolish. This gave him greatly enhanced strength and durability, coupled with moderate mechanical regeneration to repair internal damage. He was later outfitted with a larger LexCorp tech body, which gave him laser vision and further augmented his physical abilities. Soon after it was destroyed, Corben had received a new body from fellow kryptonite-powered supervillain Conduit; which gave Metallo radioactive blasts from his hands and could utilize geomagnetism to make him physically immovable, even by the Man of Steel, so long as he stood on solid ground or flooring within a building complex.

Metallo would eventually sell his soul (or what was left of it) to the demon Neron in return for increased power, gaining the abilities to mentally control and absorb any mechanical or metal object he focuses on and transforming any technology (himself included) into an extension of his exoskeleton (an ability similar to Cyborg Superman).

In experimenting with his newfound abilities, Metallo found he could alternate differing energy frequencies for harnessing and redistributing it from various power sources. Brainiac 13 upgraded Metallo to tap into various light spectra to better utilize his kryptonite-charged abilities. His mechanical body was also upgraded to be able to grow towards monolithic proportions. He is also occasionally portrayed as having a liquid metal-based endoskeleton, possessing the ability to morph parts of his body, specifically his limbs, into different weapons or tools, such as chainsaws, shovels, hammers, etc. While not a genius like Lex Luthor or Brainiac, Corben's time spent with machines has given him a gifted understanding of how they work, enabling him to tinker with their mechanical functions even before gaining his technomorphing capabilities.

Salvation Run reveals that Metallo possesses a high-calculus cyber-mind with which to run the numbers of possible and probable outcomes as well as success ratios through. In the previous continuity, the pre-Flashpoint Lex Luthor modified Corben to holster and utilize different forms of kryptonite; boasting mutagenic red-k, inverted blue-k and lastly, artificial depowering gold-kryptonite on top of the green he already possessed. He could even power a great many anti-Kryptonian armaments developed by Luthor through it.

== Other versions ==
- An alternate universe version of Metallo appears in Superman: Red Son. This version was created by Lex Luthor for the US government to combat Superman, leader of the Soviet Union.
- The Silver Age incarnation of Metallo appears in Justice.
- An alternate universe version of Metallo appears in Superman Family Adventures. This version is Jack Corben, an astronaut who sustained terminal kryptonite poisoning after flying through a kryptonite asteroid field. Lex Luthor manipulates him into believing that Superman is responsible and gives him metallic armor to treat his condition.
- A private army called the Peacemakers appear in Absolute Superman as enforcers of Lazarus Corp, with Christopher Smith appearing as a captain within one of its rank who is mentally unstable and is later forcibly turned into the cyborg Metallo by Brainiac.

== In other media ==
=== Television ===
==== Live-action ====
Brian Austin Green as John Corben as depicted in Smallville.

- The Roger Corben incarnation of Metallo appears in Superboy, portrayed by Michael Callan. This version is a bungling bank robber who suffers from chest pains. In the episode "Metallo", he tries to rob an armored car despite his condition. Superboy arrives and apprehends the bank robber, but Corben has a heart attack and is taken to a hospital. After a lengthy recuperation, he murders his doctor and escapes, but suffers another heart attack, crashes his car, and is assumed dead. A mentally-unbalanced doctor subsequently recovers his body, turns him into a cyborg, and replaces his ailing heart with kryptonite.
- The John Corben incarnation of Metallo appears in a self-titled episode of Lois & Clark: The New Adventures of Superman, portrayed by Scott Valentine. This version is Lucy Lane's boyfriend and a petty criminal. After being shot during a holdup gone wrong, former LexCorp scientist Emmett Vale rebuilds Corben into a kryptonite-powered cyborg with help from his brother Rollie Vale. Using his new form, Metallo wreaks havoc in Metropolis and fights Superman, who eventually defeats him. Emmett is captured, but Rollie escapes with Metallo's kryptonite, leaving the latter to deactivate.
- The John Corben incarnation of Metallo appears in Smallville, portrayed by Brian Austin Green in the ninth season and an uncredited actor in the tenth season. This version is a former war reporter who works at the Daily Planet alongside Lois Lane and despises the "Blur" - Clark Kent - because he rescued a prisoner who went on to murder Corben's sister. In the episode "Metallo", Corben is hit by a truck and experimented on by Major Zod's Kandorian soldiers, receiving bionic appendages and an artificial kryptonite-powered heart. Corben targets the Blur to seek revenge for his sister, but Kent uses a lead plate to defeat him before Corben is recovered by LuthorCorp CEO Tess Mercer. In the episode "Upgrade", Corben's prior insanity is explained as a flaw in his kryptonite heart while Mercer's scientists turn him into a mindless weapon. After defeating Major Zod and a red kryptonite-infected Kent, Corben regains his free will, receives a red kryptonite heart from Lane that restores his sanity, and goes underground after parting ways on good terms with her and Kent. In the episode "Prophecy", he returns to villainy and using a green kryptonite heart after Toyman recruits him into his company, "Marionette Ventures". In the comic book continuation Smallville Season 11, it is revealed that Corben's change of heart happened due to him becoming a mercenary and his biology rejecting the red kryptonite heart. During this time, a dictatorship tasked him with subduing and eliminating the rebel forces' protector: a kryptonite-powered Lana Lang. Toyman gave him his new green kryptonite heart as well as the ability to absorb meteor energy signatures to strengthen himself. After absorbing Lang's kryptonite-powered nanites, Corben gains the ability to assimilate metallic or mechanical constructs. After Lang and Lane remove his power source, the U.S. government defeats and incarcerates Corben.

===== Arrowverse =====
Six different incarnations of Metallo appear in media set in the Arrowverse:

- John Corben appears in the Supergirl episode "The Adventures of Supergirl", portrayed by Frederick Schmidt. He is initially hired by the incarcerated Lex Luthor to assassinate his half-sister Lena Luthor to prevent her from rebranding LuthorCorp, but Corben's first two attempts fail due to Supergirl and Superman's intervention. During his third attempt, Corben is foiled by Lena and Alex Danvers, with the former shooting him after he takes the latter hostage. While being sent to the hospital, Corben is intercepted by Project Cadmus, who convert him into the first Metallo. After meeting Cadmus' leader, later revealed to be Lex's mother Lillian Luthor, Corben fights Supergirl and Superman alongside another Metallo (see below), with Supergirl and Danvers defeating Corben by removing his power source. Corben is sent to jail, but Hank Henshaw smuggles in an artificial kryptonite "heart" to help him escape and frames Lillian for it. Due to the artificial kryptonite's instability, Corben undergoes a radiological meltdown and self-destructs despite Supergirl's efforts.
- To assist Corben, Lillian converts unwilling Cadmus scientist named Dr. Gilcrist (portrayed by Rich Ting) into a second Metallo. During his fight with Superman, Martian Manhunter removes Gilcrist's kryptonite heart, deactivating him.
- An alternate universe incarnation of Metallo appears in the four-part crossover "Crisis on Earth-X", voiced by Frederick Schmidt. This version is an automaton used by the Nazi regime of Earth-X, who send Metallo to take several of Earth-1's heroes captive. It is eventually destroyed by the combined efforts of the Flash, Black Canary, Killer Frost, Citizen Cold, the Ray, the Atom, Firestorm, Heat Wave, Zari Tomaz, Vibe, and Vixen.
- The fourth incarnation of Metallo appears in the fourth season of Supergirl. Introduced in the season premiere "American Alien", Otis Graves (portrayed by Robert Baker) is a member of Ben Lockwood's anti-alien activist group the Children of Liberty. Following his apparent death in the episode "Ahimsa", Otis returns in the episode "O Brother, Where Art Thou?", having been resurrected with kryptonite and converted into a Metallo before Lockwood kills Otis. The "Metallo Procedure" itself is depicted in flashbacks in the episode "Crime and Punishment".
- A fifth, unnamed Metallo appears in the Supergirl episode "All About Eve", portrayed by an uncredited actor. This version is a security guard at Eve Teschmacher's lab in National City University.
- Another alternate universe incarnation of Metallo appears in the Supergirl episode "It's a Super Life". This version is the Lena Luthor (portrayed by Katie McGrath) of a universe where she never met Supergirl, suffered a failed attempt on her life carried out by Lex that left her gravely injured, was converted into a Metallo by Lillian and Cadmus, and subsequently conquered National City.

==== Animation ====
- The John Corben incarnation of Metallo appears in The Batman two-part episode "The Batman/Superman Story", voiced by Lex Lang. This version's kryptonite heart is located where a person's actual heart would be and has a back-up power source.
- The Roger Corben incarnation of Metallo makes a cameo appearance in the Batman: The Brave and the Bold episode "Battle of the Superheroes!".
- The John Corben incarnation of Metallo appears in the Justice League Action short "True Colors", voiced by Chris Diamantopoulos.
- The John Corben incarnation of Metallo appears in Harley Quinn, voiced by Jim Rash. This version is a member of the Legion of Doom.
  - Metallo makes non-speaking cameo appearances in Kite Man: Hell Yeah!.
- Metallo appears in My Adventures with Superman. This version is a series of kryptonite-powered drones used by Lex Luthor and Amanda Waller.

===== DC Animated Universe =====
Metallo as depicted in the DC Animated Universe.

The John Corben incarnation of Metallo appears in series set in the DC Animated Universe (DCAU), primarily voiced by Malcolm McDowell.

- Corben first appears in Superman: The Animated Series. Introduced in the pilot episode "The Last Son of Krypton", this version was originally an English mercenary who worked with Lex Luthor to stage the theft of an experimental armored war suit from LexCorp and give it to the nation of Kaznia in the hopes of prompting the U.S. government to pay Luthor. However, Corben is eventually caught by Superman and incarcerated at Stryker's Island. In the episode "The Way of All Flesh", Luthor and prison physician Doctor Vale infect Corben with a rare, fatal retrovirus and manipulate him into transferring his consciousness into an indestructible, kryptonite-powered robot body in exchange for helping them kill Superman. Initially, Corben uses a special skin covering to appear human. However, he is horrified to discover that he no longer has human senses, goes insane, and partially tears off the skin, dubbing himself "Metallo".
- Metallo returns in the Justice League episode "Hereafter", voiced by Corey Burton. He joins the Superman Revenge Squad in an attempt to achieve their titular goal, but are defeated by the Justice League.
- Metallo returns in the Justice League Unlimited episode "Chaos at the Earth's Core", voiced again by McDowell. As of this series, he has joined Gorilla Grodd's Secret Society. Metallo and Silver Banshee are sent to Skartaris to obtain kryptonite, but are defeated by the Justice League. He attempts to tell them about the Society, but his brain is fried by a protocol that Grodd created to prevent the Society's secrets from reaching the League. Nonetheless, Martian Manhunter probes what is left of his mind for information.

=== Film ===
- The John Corben incarnation of Metallo appears in Superman/Batman: Public Enemies, voiced by John C. McGinley. This version is President Lex Luthor's bodyguard before being killed by Major Force, who frames Superman for it.
- The John Corben incarnation of Metallo makes a cameo appearance in All-Star Superman as an inmate of Stryker's Island.
- The John Corben incarnation of Metallo appears in Justice League: Doom, voiced by Paul Blackthorne. This version is a member of Vandal Savage's Legion of Doom and possesses shapeshifting abilities. He battles the Justice League before being killed by Superman.
- Metallo was initially considered to appear in Zack Snyder's Man of Steel sequel, but the project was eventually cancelled in favor of Batman v Superman: Dawn of Justice. It was then revealed that Metallo was going to appear in an earlier draft of Dawn of Justice, using the body of Wallace Keefe (portrayed by Scoot McNairy). It was also rumored that Metallo was going to be in the final fight between Superman, Batman, and Wonder Woman instead of Doomsday, but this was never confirmed. Despite this, the character's creator, Emmet Vale, appears in Dawn of Justice, portrayed by Ralph Lister.
- The John Corben incarnation of Metallo makes a cameo appearance in The Death of Superman.
- The John Corben incarnation of Metallo appears in Justice League: Crisis on Infinite Earths.

=== Video games ===
The John Corben incarnation of Metallo appears in several video games:

- The final boss of Superman: Shadow of Apokolips, voiced again by Malcolm McDowell.
- A boss in Superman 64. This version is a member of the Superman Revenge Squad.
- A boss in Superman: The Man of Steel, voiced by Roger L. Jackson.
- A boss in Superman Returns, voiced by Joey Camen. This version can create robotic minions and assimilate metal to increase his size and strength.
- DC Universe Online, voiced by Ryan Wickerham. This version is a member of the Secret Society.
- A non-player character (NPC) in Injustice: Gods Among Us via the Stryker's Island stage.
- A character summon in Scribblenauts Unmasked: A DC Comics Adventure.
- A playable character in Lego Batman 3: Beyond Gotham, voiced by Travis Willingham.
- A playable character in Lego DC Super-Villains, voiced again by Travis Willingham.

=== Miscellaneous ===
- The John Corben incarnation of Metallo appears in Dirk Maggs' 1990 BBC Radio adaptation of The Man of Steel, played by Simon Treves. This version wears a suit of battle armor. While fighting Superman, Corben is left in a vegetative state due to the suit's unstable psionic interface, which Luthor sabotaged to hide his role in empowering Corben. Subsequently, Corben is taken by Doctor Schwarz, a disgruntled former LexCorp employee who had been tracking the capsule that brought the infant Superman to Earth and stole it from Jonathan and Martha Kent's farm. After building him an android body powered by the capsule's kryptonite power source, Schwarz and Corben plot to kill Luthor and Superman. However, Metallo betrays and kills Schwarz. Kidnapping Lois Lane and holding her hostage at Two Mile Island's power station, he awaits and eventually fights Superman until Luthor intervenes and tears out Metallo's kryptonite heart.
- An original incarnation of Metallo appears in Young Justice: Targets. This version is Juan Cordero, a metahuman with self-healing abilities. After Lex Luthor gives his family jobs and education, Cordero decides to serve him out of gratitude, subsequently being manipulated into becoming a cyborg to oppose Superboy.
- The John Corben incarnation of Metallo appears in Legion of Super Heroes in the 31st Century #20 as a disguise of Tharok.
- An original incarnation of Metallo appears in Superman '78: The Metal Curtain. This version is Maxim Nikolaev, a decorated soldier from the Soviet Union who wears kryptonite-powered armor. After being ordered by General Viktor Morosov to defeat Superman and prove their might to the world, he fights the latter, unaware that his constant exposure to kryptonite is making him more anger-prone. After witnessing Superman rescue Russian civilians, Nikolaev sacrifices himself to destroy his armor and ensure its kryptonite could not be used to harm others again.

=== Merchandise ===
The John Corben incarnation of Metallo received a "Collect and Connect" figure in Wave 5 of the DC Universe Classics line.

== See also ==
- List of Superman enemies
