= Toyman =

- The Winslow Schott incarnation of Toyman as depicted in Action Comics #865 (May 2008). Art by Jesus Merino.

Publication information
- Publisher: DC Comics
- First appearance: (Schott); Action Comics #64 (September 1943) (Nimball); Action Comics #432 (February 1974) (Okamura); Superman (vol. 2) #177 (February 2002)
- Created by: (Schott); Don Cameron; Ed Dobrotka (Nimball); Cary Bates; Curt Swan (Okamura); Jeph Loeb; Ed McGuinness

In-story information
- Alter ego: Winslow Percival Schott; Jack Nimball; Hiro Okamura
- Species: Human
- Team affiliations: (Schott); Superman Revenge Squad; The Society; Injustice League; Super Foes (Nimball); Legion of Doom
- Notable aliases: (Okamura): Toymaster
- Abilities: (All): Genius-level intellect; (Schott & Nimball): Use of dangerous toys; (Okamura): Mechanical aptitude

The Toyman is the name of three supervillains and one adolescent superhero appearing in comic books published by DC Comics. He is depicted as an adversary for Superman.

The most well-known incarnation of Toyman is Winslow Schott, a criminal who uses toy-based or toy-themed devices and gimmicks in his various crimes. Toyman made frequent appearances in Golden Age comics, but has appeared infrequently since then.

In the succeeding years, small-time crook Jack Nimball briefly took up the mantle after Schott retired while Japanese genius Hiro Okamura uses the name while operating as a superhero despite Schott coming out of retirement by then.

Schott, Nimball, and Okamura have made several appearances in DC-related media, with Schott appearing in television series set in the DC Animated Universe, in which he is voiced by Bud Cort, and the live-action television series Smallville, portrayed by Chris Gauthier. Additionally, Schott along with his son and series original character Winslow "Winn" Schott Jr. appear in the live-action Arrowverse television series Supergirl, portrayed by Henry Czerny and Jeremy Jordan respectively.

== Publication history ==
The Winslow Schott version of Toyman first appeared in Action Comics #64 (September 1943) and was created by Don Cameron and Ed Dobrotka. The first Silver Age appearance of Toyman was in Superman issue #182 from 1966.

The Jack Nimball version of Toyman first appeared in Action Comics #432 (February 1974) and was created by Cary Bates and Curt Swan.

The Hiro Okamura version of Toyman first appeared in Superman (vol. 2) #127 (February 2002) and was created by Jeph Loeb and Ed McGuinness.

== Fictional character biography ==
=== Winslow Schott ===
==== Pre-Crisis ====
Toyman vs. Superman, from the cover of Action Comics #64, art by Joe Shuster

Toyman first appeared in 1943 and appeared in several Golden Age Superman stories. Schott appeared less frequently in comics published after the early 1950s, but remained a semi-regular foe during the 1960s, 1970s, and 1980s.

Winslow Schott started out as a boy who had a knack for toymaking. He made his own biplane that got destroyed by the neighborhood bully Chester Dunholtz. When he reached adulthood, Schott became a successful toymaker, but the incident from his childhood led him to go on a life of crime and develop dangerous toys to help him in his crimes.

While initially portrayed as more of a nuisance, Toyman gradually grew more emotionally unstable and paranoid over time, his toys following suit by becoming significantly more dangerous. In his civilian persona, Winslow Schott was sweet, humble, and quirky (though socially withdrawn). As Toyman, however, he became a childish and destructive megalomaniac. During the 1970s, Schott was effectively retired from crime, but he kept in contact with Superman, even helping take down Jack Nimball, whom he felt had sullied the Toyman legacy.

This retirement proved to be short, as not long after Winslow put some of his toys on display, the entire museum exhibition was destroyed. Sightings reported this to be the work of a man in blue tights flying at great speeds. Believing Superman had made a fool of him, Schott swore to destroy everything that Superman cared about to avenge his life's work. It is revealed that the real culprit was Bizarro, in search of a duplicator ray, but by then it was already too late. Schott had already returned to his criminal ways, murdered Jack Nimball, and built a giant robot to terrorize the city. After this incident, Schott's mental state grew even worse, and while he often made several legitimate attempts to atone for his crimes, he would often relapse back into madness.

==== Post-Crisis ====
After 1985's miniseries Crisis on Infinite Earths and John Byrne's Man of Steel miniseries, Toyman's history was revised, and the Post-Crisis version of the character first appeared in Superman (vol. 2) #13 (January 1988). In this version, Winslow Schott is a British toymaker who was fired from his job and blames Lex Luthor and LexCorp for the loss of employment. He uses his toymaking talents to seek revenge, which causes him to cross paths with the British hero Godiva and Superman himself. Toyman continues to commit various crimes in Metropolis, including engaging in child abduction.

Toyman later became a much more sinister figure, shaving his head, wearing black and getting advice in his head from "Mother". This was prompted by him being told that a range of Superman action figures would not include him, as he was not "edgy" enough. While this seems to begin as a pose of what he thought people expect of a villain, it rapidly became a true psychotic break. While in this state he abducted and later murdered Adam Morgan, the son of Daily Planet reporter Cat Grant.

He was later seen as a member of the Injustice League in the Justice League of America Wedding Special.

Toyman's history was later revised in Action Comics #865, by Geoff Johns and Jesus Merino. Winslow Schott tells Jimmy Olsen that he was a toymaker who lived with his wife, Mary. When a businessman offered to buy his shop to expand the number of children that his toys can reach, he refused. When Mary was killed in a car accident a few weeks later, Schott agreed to the purchase. However, the businessman lied and gave his technologically advanced toy plans to arms manufacturers. Schott proceeded to bomb the business with an explosive teddy bear. A twist at the end of the story reveals that Mary was one of his first robotic creations.

Schott reveals to Jimmy Olsen that Toyman who killed Adam Grant was a robot created by Schott to replace him in the event that he was ever incarcerated and that a glitch in the robot's programming resulted in it developing a personality and a hatred of children, and that Schott's repeated attempts to contact the robot resulted in it suffering from delusions of "Mother".

In the Supergirl series while in Arkham Asylum, Toyman is visited by Cat Grant and Supergirl. Grant interrogates him about children who have been kidnapped with dolls left behind. Toyman claims that he is innocent and the robotic dolls attack him. Supergirl saves him and gets him to medical care. When Grant returns home, she is confronted by the Dollmaker. He identifies himself as Anton Schott, implying that he is related to Toyman. The Dollmaker reveals himself to be the abandoned son of Winslow, who has been kidnapping and enslaving children. He tells Grant that he wants her to become his new mother, and that he wishes to serve as a replacement for her murdered son, but Grant violently rejects him.

==== DC Rebirth ====
In 2016, DC Comics implemented another relaunch of its books called "DC Rebirth" which restored its continuity to a form much as it was prior to "The New 52". Toyman was first seen in Harley Quinn's hallucination.

While in his prison cell following a fight with Superman, Toyman was approached by King: Director of Checkmate who recruits Toyman to help take down Leviathan. Toyman takes this opportunity.

=== Jack Nimball ===
In the 1970s, Jack Nimball is a small-time crook assumes the identity of the second Toyman during a period in which Schott had retired from his criminal career. Nimball first appeared in Action Comics #432 (February 1974). Nimball wore a jester costume and used a similar modus operandi to the original Toyman. However, this version of Toyman proved short-lived. Schott killed Nimball with a mechanical toy bird and resumed his criminal career in Superman #305 (November 1976). Nimball was restored to continuity following the DC Rebirth relaunch where Superman thwarted his Christmas heist.

=== Hiro Okamura ===
Hiro Okamura (岡村 ヒロ, Okamura Hiro) is a teenage mechanical genius from Japan first appearing as Toyman in Superman (vol. 2) #177 (February 2002) by Jeph Loeb and Ed McGuinness. He shows up in Metropolis in a giant Superman Robot fighting Metallo, claiming that the cyborg's body was based on material stolen from his grandfather.

He later becomes an ally to Superman and Batman. In the Superman/Batman series, he aids the two in destroying a kryptonite meteor that threatens Earth. He strikes a deal with Batman to provide him with various technological implements. Okamura uses more technologically advanced devices than the traditionally-constructed contrivances that Schott uses and his work is largely whimsical in nature. Many of his inventions are inspired by anime and manga, including giant mechas.

In Superman/Batman #26, Okamura fakes his own kidnapping at the hands of Winslow Schott. Superboy and Robin attempt to rescue Okamura, but offer their friendship to him after learning of his scheme and realizing that he is lonely. Okamura attends Superboy's funeral at Titans Tower after he is killed by Superboy-Prime.

A future version of Okamura, allied with a power-hungry group of Titans, travels back in time to the modern day to cement their power-base in Teen Titans (vol. 3) #52 (January 2008).

In 2011, The New 52 rebooted the DC Comics universe. Hiro Okamura operates as the Toymaster. He appears as a confidant at his Toymaster Gameshop for a witness named Condesa to Clark Kent and Lois Lane's story on HODOR_Root, in which he agrees to help them.

== Skills and abilities ==
Winslow Schott possesses an incredible technological prowess and expertise in robotics, as well as knowledge of biological weaponry. Despite the childish motif which he usually insists on incorporating, his creations are highly sophisticated, destructive, and dangerous. In addition, most of these inventions have an innocuous or even comical appearance that disconcerts his opponents.

Jack Nimball, the second Toyman, possesses skills identical to Winslow Schott.

Hiro Okamura is considered to be a skilled engineer, able to fix most machinery (such as giant robots and computer hardware).

== Other characters named Toyman ==
=== Toyman robot ===
Toyman surfaces in Metropolis and allies with Lex Luthor in Action Comics #837 (May 2006) as part of the One Year Later 'Up, Up, and Away' story arc. His first appearance was written by Geoff Johns and Kurt Busiek with art by Pete Woods.

His appearance, inspired by the character's Superman: The Animated Series incarnation, is that of a child-sized doll. This Toyman mentions meeting Hiro Okamura in Japan and stealing one of his Superman robots. As part of his bargain with Luthor, he is given the information needed to find his creator Winslow Schott in exchange for assistance in a plot against Superman.

In Justice League of America (vol. 2) #13, Toyman appears as a member of the Injustice League.

=== Toywoman ===
A female version of Toyman named Toywoman appears in Superman #349 (July 1980). She is a gender-inverted version of Winslow Schott created by Mister Mxyzptlk to serve as an enemy to his creation Superwoman. Once Superman tricks Mxyzptlk into saying his name backwards, Superwoman and Toywoman are erased from existence.

=== Bizarro Toyman ===
A Bizarro counterpart of Toyman appears in Action Comics #856 (November 2007). He was created by the original Bizarro, who gained the ability to clone himself and create Bizarro lifeforms after being infused with radiation from a blue sun.

== Other versions ==
=== World's Finest Comics ===
An unidentified Toyman appears in World's Finest Comics #167 (June 1967).

=== Titans Tomorrow ===
An older Hiro Okamura appears in the Titans Tomorrow reality as a member of the Titans Army who utilizes a suit of orange-and-blue manga-themed battle armor.

=== Whatever Happened to the Man of Tomorrow? ===
Toyman appears in Whatever Happened to the Man of Tomorrow?, where he and Prankster are unwittingly manipulated by Mister Mxyzptlk to discover Superman's secret identity. They succeed after kidnapping Pete Ross and torturing the information out of him, then killing him. After managing to unmask Clark Kent in front of Lana Lang and others, Toyman and Prankster are captured.

=== Justice ===
Toyman appears in Justice. This version is a member of the Legion of Doom who communicates through a human-sized marionette resembling Jack Nimball, became obese and infected with Brainiac's cybernetics, and is based in a city resembling a funhouse and populated primarily by children and families that he has taken hostage.

Absolute Universe

The Winslow Schott iteration of Toyman appears in Absolute Superman. This version of the character is depicted as a more sinister corrupt businessman, engaging in brutal child labor and horrid human trafficking of children by turning them into living dolls to sell off to predators, with devices acquired from Brainiac. Superman gets into conflict with Winslow on multiple occasions, destroying his operations and having him imprisoned for his crimes.

== In other media ==
=== Television ===
==== Animation ====
- Toyman appears in The New Adventures of Superman. This version is the unnamed son of Winslow Schott.
- The Jack Nimball incarnation of Toyman appears in Challenge of the Superfriends, voiced by Frank Welker. This version is a member of Lex Luthor's Legion of Doom.
  - Toyman was meant to appear in the Super Friends: The Legendary Super Powers Show episode "The Case of the Dreadful Dolls", but was declared off-limits and replaced by series original villain the Dollmaker (not to be confused with the Batman villain of the same name). In a nod to Toyman, the Dollmaker's lair is located in Schott's Toymaking Factory.
- An original incarnation of Toyman resembling Jack Nimball appears in a self-titled episode of The Plastic Man Comedy/Adventure Show, voiced by Alan Oppenheimer.
- The Winslow Schott incarnation of Toyman appears in series set in the DC Animated Universe (DCAU), voiced primarily by Bud Cort, and by Corey Burton in Justice League. This version, also known as Winslow Schott Jr., is the son of Winslow Schott Sr., who dreamed of building a toy factory but lacked capital. Crime boss Bruno Mannheim offered to bankroll him to secretly use the factory as a front for a numbers racket. When the police discovered the scheme, the gangsters left Schott Sr. to take the fall. As a result, he was falsely imprisoned for 10 years and died in prison before he could be paroled. Meanwhile, Schott Jr. spent several years in abusive and neglectful foster homes, which left him a deranged adult. This version of Toyman notably wears a mask based on the head of a puppet doll, and his real face is never revealed.
  - Schott Jr. first appears in Superman: The Animated Series. Throughout the episodes "Fun and Games" and "Obsession", he creates an android named Darci Mason and seeks revenge against Mannheim for wronging his father as well as Superman for foiling his schemes before he and Darci are seemingly killed in the latter episode.
  - Schott Jr. resurfaces in the Static Shock episode "Toys in the Hood". Having survived the events of "Obsession", he and Darci turn up in Dakota to capture Static's friend Daisy Watkins and use her as a model for Darci's new nanite-constructed body. After Superman and Static join forces to confront Schott Jr. and rescue Daisy, Darci betrays him and tries to escape, only to be killed by a failsafe device he created to destroy her if she ever did so. Subsequently, Schott Jr. is taken to jail.
  - Schott Jr. appears in the Justice League episode "Hereafter" as a member of the Superman Revenge Squad. During their fight with the Justice League, he uses an experimental machine resembling a giant toy robot to seemingly kill Superman, but unknowingly transports him to a post-apocalyptic future.
  - Schott Jr. appears in Justice League Unlimited as a member of Gorilla Grodd's Secret Society. Prior to and during the episodes "Alive!" and "Destroyer", Lex Luthor takes command of the Society, but Grodd mounts a mutiny. In the ensuing battle, Schott Jr. sides with the former before Darkseid attacks and kills most of the Society. Luthor, Schott Jr., and the survivors return to Earth and work with the Justice League to foil Darkseid's invasion.
- The Jack Nimball incarnation of Toyman makes a cameo appearance in The Batman episode "Lost Heroes", voiced by Richard Green.
- The Winslow Schott incarnation of Toyman appears in the Batman: The Brave and the Bold episode "Battle of the Superheroes!", voiced by John DiMaggio.
  - Fun Haus, a character based on the Jack Nimball incarnation of Toyman, is voiced by Gary Anthony Williams.
- The Winslow Schott incarnation of Toyman appears in the Young Justice episode "Intervention", voiced by Cameron Bowen.
- The Jack Nimball incarnation of Toyman appears in Robot Chicken, voiced by Seth Green. This version is a member of the Legion of Doom.
- A villainous version of Hiro Okamura / Toyman appears in Justice League Action, voiced by Ken Jeong.
- The Winslow Schott incarnation of Toyman appears in Harley Quinn, voiced by Tom Hollander. This version is a member of the Legion of Doom.
  - Toyman appears in Kite Man: Hell Yeah!, voiced by Andy Daly.
- A teenage Winslow Schott appears in DC Super Hero Girls, voiced by Charlie Schlatter.
- The Jack Nimball incarnation of Toyman appears in Batwheels, voiced by James Arnold Taylor.
- The Winslow Schott incarnation of Toyman appears in My Adventures with Superman, voiced by Michael Yurchak. This version is an near-elderly pawn shop owner, a robotics and demolitions expert, and an old friend of Sam Lane.
- A villainous version of Hiro Okamura / Toyman appears in Bat-Fam, voiced by Kailen Jude.

==== Live-action ====
- An original incarnation of Toyman named Orlich Hoffman appears in the Wonder Woman episode "The Deadly Toys", portrayed by Frank Gorshin.
- A character based on Toyman called Nick Knack appears in Superboy, portrayed by Gilbert Gottfried. He is an electronics genius who dresses in child-like clothes.
- Winslow P. Schott appears in the Lois & Clark: The New Adventures of Superman episode "Seasons Greedings", portrayed by Sherman Hemsley. This version has a similar background to the post-Crisis incarnation of Schott and displays a genuine love for children, which contributes to him reforming by the end of the episode. Though the character is never referred to as Toyman, episode writer Dean Cain confirmed that he based him on Toyman while acknowledging that he differs from his comic book portrayal. A second Toyman, Harold Kripstly, was portrayed by Grant Shaud in the series' fourth season.
- The Winslow Schott incarnation of Toyman appears in Smallville, portrayed by Chris Gauthier. This version originally worked for S.T.A.R. Labs before he was hired by Oliver Queen to work for Queen Industries, subsequently fired for putting explosives in his toys, and found work with a recuperating Lex Luthor. After a string of failures that lead to him being arrested, Schott establishes Marionette Ventures, an organization dedicated to controlling Smallville's waterfront properties, to challenge Clark Kent and the Justice League.
- Several characters based on Toyman appear in Supergirl:
  - Introduced in the episode "Childish Things", the Winslow Schott incarnation of Toyman (portrayed by Henry Czerny) tried to kill his boss Chester Dunholz for his perceived theft of his projects 10 years prior to the series, but Dunholz survived while six innocents were killed. After learning what happened, his son Winslow "Winn" Schott Jr. (portrayed by Jeremy Jordan) never forgave him for giving in to his rage. In the present, Schott escapes from prison and forces Winn to help him make another attempt on Dunholz's life before Supergirl defeats him. As of the episode "Schott Through the Heart", Schott has died. In the two-part episode "Back from the Future", Winn encounters a digital consciousness based on his father while attempting to stop the digital consciousness of a villainous doppelgänger of himself. After Winn reluctantly agrees to let Schott help, the latter sacrifices himself to delete the alternate Winn's consciousness.
    - "Schott Through the Heart" also introduces a female version of Jack Nimball named Jacqueline Nimball / Toywoman, portrayed by Brooke Smith. Following Schott's death, his protégé Nimball targets his ex-wife Mary and Winn, though they work with Supergirl to defeat her.
    - "Back from the Future" also features an alternate universe version of Winn (also portrayed by Jordan) who took on the mantle of Toyman following his father's death. After Brainiac 5 frees him from prison on Lex Luthor's behalf, Toyman attempts to frame Winn for terrorism in the future by uploading his mind into the Department of Extranormal Operations (DEO)'s computers to invade the Internet. With help from a digital copy of his father's consciousness, Winn hacks the system and deletes both of the Toymen's consciousnesses. As he had joined the Legion by this time, Winn changes his Legionnaire codename from "Computer Lad" to "Toyman" in his father's memory and to do good in his name.

=== Film ===
- An unidentified Toyman appears in the unproduced Batman vs. Superman. This version would have been a reformed criminal that Batman interrogates and tortures to locate the Joker. When they are attacked by one of the Joker's deadly gadgets, Batman narrowly escapes, leaving Toyman to be caught in an explosion. His fate is not revealed in the script.
- The Winslow Schott incarnation of Toyman appears in Superman: Doomsday, voiced by John DiMaggio. This version is more deranged and unkempt than other incarnations and possesses a Goth aesthetic. Following Superman's apparent death while fighting Doomsday, Toyman holds a school bus full of children hostage while robbing a bank until a clone of Superman defeats him. Following this, Toyman becomes a fugitive and kills an innocent before the police recapture him. After learning this, the Superman clone kills Toyman.
- The Hiro Okamura incarnation of Toyman appears in Superman/Batman: Public Enemies, voiced by Calvin Tran.
- The Jack Nimball incarnation of Toyman appears in JLA Adventures: Trapped in Time, voiced by Tom Gibis. This version is a living wooden doll and a member of the Legion of Doom.
- The Jack Nimball incarnation of Toyman makes a cameo appearance in Justice League Dark: Apokolips War.
- The Winslow Schott incarnation of Toyman makes a non-speaking appearance in Teen Titans Go! & DC Super Hero Girls: Mayhem in the Multiverse as a member of the Legion of Doom.

=== Video games ===
- The Winslow Schott incarnation of Toyman appears in DC Universe Online, voiced by Matt Hislope.
- The Winslow Schott incarnation of Toyman appears as a character summon in Scribblenauts Unmasked: A DC Comics Adventure.
- The Winslow Schott incarnation of Toyman appears as a playable character in Lego Batman 3: Beyond Gotham, voiced by Nolan North.
- The Winslow Schott incarnation of Toyman appears as a playable character in Lego DC Super-Villains, voiced again by Corey Burton.
- The Jack Nimball incarnation of Toyman appears in DC Super Hero Girls: Teen Power, voiced again by Charlie Schlatter.
- The Hiro Okamura incarnation of Toyman appears in Suicide Squad: Kill the Justice League, voiced by Christopher Sean. This version is a supporting member of the Suicide Squad.

=== Miscellaneous ===
- The Smallville incarnation of Winslow Schott and Hiro Okamura appear in Smallville Season 11. After foiling criminals wearing teleportation vests that were stolen in a previous LexCorp robbery, Superman and Lex Luthor reluctantly join forces to solve the mystery. They initially suspect Schott, who is incarcerated at Stryker's Island in "hyper-solitary". Upon being interviewed by Lois Lane about the Prankster, Schott reveals they used to work together at Queen Industries' R&D department before he transferred to LexCorp and Prankster is a cheat who stole his idea for kryptonite bullets. Additionally, Schott modified John Corben's kryptonite heart to give him the ability to absorb kryptonite radiation.
- The Winslow Schott incarnation of Toyman and Hiro Okamura appear in the Batman: The Brave and the Bold tie-in comics.
- The Hiro Okamura incarnation of Toyman appears in the Catwoman: Queen of Thieves podcast.
- An unidentified Toyman appears in the DC Super Friends tie-in comics.
- In 2011, Mattel released a DC Universe Classics 6" Toyman figure based on the Jack Nimball incarnation of Toyman.

== See also ==
- List of Superman enemies
- Killer toys
