= Superman Revenge Squad =

Supervillain groups in DC Comics

Publication information
- Publisher: DC Comics
- First appearance: As the Superboy Revenge Squad: Superboy #94 (January 1962); As the Superman Revenge Squad: Action Comics #286 (March 1962)

In-story information
- Member(s): (Post-Crisis); Morgan Edge; Maxima; Barrage; Riot; Anomaly

The Superman Revenge Squad is the name of two fictional organizations appearing in American comic books published by DC Comics. As their name suggests, it is a group of Superman villains who banded together to defeat the Man of Steel.

== Fictional background ==
=== Pre-Crisis on Infinite Earths ===
In pre-Crisis continuity, the Squad originated as the Superboy Revenge Squad, debuting in Superboy #94 (January 1962); the Superman Revenge Squad subsequently appeared in Action Comics #286 (March 1962). Both Squads are composed of aliens from the planet Wexr II, whom Superboy had prevented from achieving galactic conquest. The Squad later grows to include members from other planets, all of whom are sworn enemies of Superman.

Many of the Squad's plans to destroy Superman use psychological warfare, including red kryptonite-induced nightmares, hypnotising Superman into committing destructive acts, and tricking Superman into revealing his secret identity. They transferred the intelligence of a Superman robot into a super-powered body, making him Wonder Man, and hoping he would destroy Superman with some kryptonite that he was given and to which he was invulnerable. He later realized their plot and, with Superman, threw the ship with such force it would take years for the two members to break free, but Wonder Man then told Superman that his body would soon die. Once they lured Superman into following them to 1,000,000 AD, where he lost his powers and was trapped on the Earth, due to the Sun having turned red by then. He used a miniature Kandorian rocket left in his Fortress of Solitude, after shrinking himself with red kryptonite, to travel back to his own time.

In their earliest appearances, the Squad members appeared hooded to keep their identities secret. Later versions of the Squad wear modified versions of Superman's costume, with the Superman logo made of kryptonite and their heads shaved bald in tribute to Lex Luthor.

=== Post-Crisis on Infinite Earths ===
In Adventures of Superman #543 (February 1997), a new version of the Revenge Squad is introduced. The new Squad is established by Morgan Edge, who assembles various characters with a grudge against Superman and attempts to frame Lex Luthor as their leader. Its members include Maxima, Barrage, Riot, Misa, and Anomaly.

In Action Comics #736 (August 1997), Edge assembles another version of the team, consisting of Barrage, Parasite, Rock, and Baud.

In the "Last Son" storyline, Lex Luthor constructs a new team, which Superman joins to battle General Zod. The Revenge Squad consists of Metallo, Parasite, and Bizarro.

==== DC Rebirth ====
A new incarnation of the Superman Revenge Squad appears in The New 52 continuity reboot, founded by Cyborg Superman and the Eradicator and consisting of Blanque, Metallo, Mongul, and General Zod.

== Other versions ==
- A Batman Revenge Squad appears in World's Finest Comics #175 (May 1968), consisting of Cash Carew, Barney the Blast, and the Flamethrower.
- An "Ambush Bug Revenge Squad", consisting of fans of the eponymous hero who want him destroyed, appear in Ambush Bug: Year None #4 (December 2008).
- A "Cyborg Revenge Squad" appears in DC Special: Cyborg #6 (December 2008), formed by Elias Orr and Cyborg 2.0 and consisting of Shrapnel, Gizmo, Magenta, Girder, the Thinker, and Cyborgirl.
- A Spider-Man Revenge Squad appears in Marvel Comics' The Spectacular Spider-Man (1976), consisting of lesser-known Spider-Man villains such as the Spot, Kangaroo, Gibbon, and Grizzly.

== In other media ==
- The Superman Revenge Squad appears in the Justice League episode "Hereafter", consisting of Metallo, Kalibak, Livewire, Weather Wizard, and Toyman.
- The Superman Revenge Squad appears in Superman 64, consisting of Lex Luthor, Darkseid, Parasite, Brainiac, Metallo, and Mala.
- The Superman Revenge Squad's name was adopted by Nosferatu D2 frontman Ben Parker for his solo recordings.
