= Legion of Doom =

Group of super villains in the DC universe

- The Legion of Doom members from left to right: Black Manta, Giganta, Toyman, Riddler, Bizarro, Scarecrow, Lex Luthor, Captain Cold, Cheetah, Solomon Grundy, Gorilla Grodd, Brainiac, and Sinestro.

Publication information
- Publisher: DC Comics
- First appearance: TV: Challenge of the Superfriends, Episode 1: "Wanted: The Super Friends" (September 9, 1978); Comics: Extreme Justice #16 (May 1996)

In-story information
- Base(s): Hall of Doom
- Leader(s): Lex Luthor
- Member(s): Bizarro; Black Manta; Brainiac; Captain Cold; Cheetah; Giganta; Gorilla Grodd; Riddler; Scarecrow; Sinestro; Solomon Grundy; Toyman

The Legion of Doom is a group of supervillains who originated in Challenge of the Superfriends, an animated series from Hanna-Barbera based on DC Comics' Justice League. The Legion of Doom has since been incorporated into the main DC Universe, appearing in American comic books, as well as further animated and live-action adaptations, and video games.

== History ==
In each episode of Challenge of the Superfriends that they appeared, the Legion of Doom would enact a plot against the Super Friends and a plot to take over the world only to be met with defeat by the end of the story. In some episodes, they would escape capture through a last-minute escape plan often contrived by Luthor. Other times, the Legion of Doom (or portions of it) would end up apprehended.

The episode "History of Doom" showed that Lex Luthor assembled 13 supervillains in order to form the most powerful and sinister group the world had ever seen.

== Development ==
When the Challenge of the Superfriends season was originally conceived, it was named Battle of the Superheroes and featured the introduction of Captain Marvel to the Super Friends. The group that challenged the heroes was to be called the "League of Evil", led by Captain Marvel's nemesis Doctor Sivana. However, Filmation was producing Shazam! and The New Adventures of Batman which prevented the use of characters such as Mister Atom, King Kull, Beautia Sivana, The Joker, The Penguin, Mr. Freeze, and Catwoman. Early conceptual art drawn by Alex Toth also included Heat Wave, Poison Ivy, and Abra Kadabra.

== The Hall of Doom ==
The Legion of Doom's headquarters was the Hall of Doom which was located in Slaughter Swamp (just outside Gotham City). The facility, which resembles Black Manta's helmet, could be lowered or raised above the swamp water's surface. It could fly or enter space using rockets. The Hall of Doom's mobility could be controlled through remote control helping the Legion to escape on several occasions. Its defenses included laser weapons and the ability to time travel.

In "Doomsday" after Sinestro, Black Manta and Cheetah are abandoned by the rest of the Legion after they take control of a mental device, they use it to create another Hall of Doom, which attacks the original one and enables the Legion to be captured.

In "History of Doom", it is revealed that the Hall of Doom was placed in a swamp as a compromise between Black Manta, Captain Cold, and Gorilla Grodd, who respectively wanted it to be placed in the ocean, underneath the polar ice caps, and in a jungle.

== Members ==
There were thirteen members of the Legion of Doom:

- Bizarro (voiced by William Callaway) is a twisted duplicate of Superman created from a duplication ray by Lex Luthor on Earth. He has powers similar to Superman, but opposite in some aspects, namely his ice vision and heat breath.
- Black Manta (voiced by Ted Cassidy) is a deep sea diver and would-be ocean conqueror.
- Brainiac (voiced by Ted Cassidy) is an alien android with advanced intelligence.
- Captain Cold (voiced by Dick Ryal) is a blue-suited villain with mastery over cold temperatures.
- Cheetah (voiced by Marlene Aragon) is a villain themed after her namesake who possesses cat-like abilities.
- Giganta (voiced by Ruth Forman) is a villain who stole Apache Chief's magical powder to duplicate his powers, gaining the ability to grow to an immense size.
- Gorilla Grodd (voiced by Stanley Ralph Ross) is a megalomaniacal gorilla who was exiled from Gorilla City. He possesses immense strength and intelligence.
- Lex Luthor (voiced by Stanley Jones) is a mad scientist and the founder of the Legion of Doom.
- Riddler (voiced by Michael Bell) is an enemy of Batman who uses riddles to taunt and confuse adversaries while committing crimes.
- Scarecrow (voiced by Don Messick) is an enemy of Batman who uses fear gas to bring his opponents' fears to life.
- Sinestro (voiced by Vic Perrin) is a renegade former Green Lantern and enemy of the Green Lantern Corps.
- Solomon Grundy (voiced by Jimmy Weldon) is a gangster who was resurrected as a superpowered zombie.
- Toyman (voiced by Frank Welker) is a villain who dresses as a jester and uses toy-based tactics to commit crimes.
- The episode "Super Friends: Rest In Peace" reveals that the Legion of Doom has a previously unrevealed fourteenth member, Doctor Natas. He created Noxium, a crystal with the ability to recreate and exploit the weaknesses of any hero.

== Appearances in comics ==
Members of the Legion of Doom made some appearances in the Super Friends spin-off comic title based on the TV series:

- A version of the Legion of Doom appeared in Extreme Justice #16–18 (May–July 1996), led by Brainwave Jr. and consisting of Killer Frost, Houngan, Major Force, the Madmen, and a robot duplicate of Gorilla Grodd.

The Legion of Doom in their Justice incarnation. From left to right: Clayface, Poison Ivy, Solomon Grundy, Parasite, Toyman, Sinestro, Black Manta, Scarecrow, Brainiac, Lex Luthor, Gorilla Grodd, Captain Cold, Cheetah, Riddler, Bizarro, Giganta, Black Adam and Metallo. Art by Alex Ross and Doug Braithwaite.

- The 2006 DC comic miniseries Justice features a version of the Legion of Doom, consisting of traditional members Lex Luthor, Bizarro, Black Manta, Brainiac, Captain Cold, Cheetah, Giganta, Gorilla Grodd, Riddler, Scarecrow, Sinestro, Solomon Grundy and new members Black Adam, Metallo, Clayface, Parasite, and Poison Ivy.
- An alternate version of the team appeared in the mini-series Flashpoint: Legion of Doom, part of the company-wide Flashpoint event. This iteration of the team consisted of supervillains interned in Doom Prison, which is based on the Legion headquarters from Super Friends. The membership consisted of Heat Wave, Plastic Man, Sportsmaster, Killer Wasp, and Cluemaster.
- A new Legion of Doom led by Superboy-Prime appeared in a Teen Titans storyline that ran from issues #98–100. The roster consisted of Sun Girl, Headcase, Persuader (Elise Kimble), Indigo, Zookeeper, three Superboy clones, and Inertia.
- In the mini-series Super Powers, Lex Luthor introduces a Legion of Doom featuring Bizarro, Black Manta, Brainiac, Captain Cold, Cheetah, Gorilla Grodd, Pryme, Riddler, Scarecrow, Sinestro, and Starro.
- In Superman #43 (May 2018), the Bizarro Legion of Doom on Earth-29 was called as Legion of Fun. It included Bizarro versions of Black Manta, Captain Cold, Cheetah, Giganta, Poison Ivy, Lex Luthor, Riddler, Scarecrow, Toyman, Sinestro (Green Lanturn), Gorilla Grodd (Gorilla-Odd), Joker (Jo-Cryer), Brainiac (Nobrainz), and Solomon Grundy (Solomon Grundzarro).
- The first arc of Scott Snyder and Jim Cheung's Justice League relaunch for DC Rebirth features the Legion of Doom as the main antagonists. The group consists of Lex Luthor, Sinestro, Cheetah, Gorilla Grodd, Brainiac, and Turtle. Former members include Black Manta and Joker, both excommunicated due to their own ulterior motives. To prepare for all-out war with the Justice League, Luthor also recruits various villains to his cause including Bizarro of Earth 29, Black Adam, Black Manta, Black Mask, Captain Cold, Catwoman, Circe and her Injustice League Dark (consisting of Floronic Man, Solomon Grundy, Klarion the Witch Boy, and Papa Midnite), Deathstroke, Harley Quinn, Heat Wave, Lobo, Mr. Freeze, Ocean Master, Oracle, Ra's al Ghul, Red Hood, Riddler, Talon, and the Terribles of Earth 29 (consisting of Mister Terrible, Change-O-Shape-O, Figment Girl, and Disposable Man).
  - This Legion reappears in Dark Crisis, consisting of Lex Luthor, Vandal Savage, Punchline, Cheetah, Gorilla Grodd, Black Manta, Sinestro, Scarecrow, and the Rogues (Captain Cold, Heat Wave, Golden Glider, Captain Boomerang, and Weather Wizard).
  - A new version of the Legion of Doom appears in the 2024 series Justice League Unlimited, consisting of Lex Luthor, Bizarro, Black Manta, Brainiac, Captain Cold, Cheetah, Gorilla Grodd, Joker, Riddler, Scarecrow, Sinestro, Solomon Grundy, and Pythoness.
  - As part of the Wonder Comics imprint, Wonder Twins featured a version of the Legion of Doom, whose roster is not revealed.
- A future version of the Legion of Doom is introduced in "Future State", led by T. O. Morrow and consisting of Amaz-X, Cobalt Blue, Despera, The Flood, Professor Ivo, Lex Luthor, Screech Owl, and UltraViolet Lantern.
- The Legion of Doom appears in DC x Sonic the Hedgehog: Metal Legion, consisting of Lex Luthor, Black Manta, Captain Cold, Catwoman (who is later revealed to be a double-agent working for the Justice League), Cheetah, Gizmo, and Sinestro. The Legion is later joined by Doctor Eggman, who ends up betraying them, and creating the Metal Legion, a horde of robotic duplicates of the Legion members similar to Metal Sonic.

== In other media ==
=== Television ===
- The Legion of Doom appears in Legends of the Superheroes, led by Mordru and consisting of Doctor Sivana, Riddler, Giganta, Sinestro, Weather Wizard, and Solomon Grundy.
- While never directly referred to as such in Justice League Unlimited, with only the DVD box set for the third season explicitly doing so, the Legion of Doom served as inspiration for the Secret Society, which is originally led by Gorilla Grodd before Lex Luthor takes over and also includes Bizarro, Devil Ray, Cheetah, Giganta, Sinestro, and Toyman among their ranks. Series producer Bruce Timm said that he wanted to include the Riddler and Scarecrow as members as a nod to the original Legion, but could not do so due to the "Bat-embargo", which limited the use of Batman-related characters at the time. By the end of the series, Luthor, Bizarro, Cheetah, Giganta, Toyman, and Sinestro, among others, survive an attack by Darkseid before joining forces with the Justice League to foil his invasion of Earth. Luthor disappears with Darkseid after finding the Anti-Life Equation while the other survivors are given a "five-minute head start" in return. Of this final appearance, series writer Matt Wayne stated that he consciously tried to round up as many of the original thirteen Legionnaires as he could, citing the Legion's Wikipedia page as one source. (Note: One of the nicest bits in "Alive!" was consciously making Luthor's team the villains that the audience had seen most of, more or less, and cared about. Which was good, since we were hopefully making the audience worry about and root for Luthor's group. This also let us come as close as we could to the classic 13 LOD villains. Grodd was now the enemy and was dead; Captain Cold wasn't around; Devil Ray and Grundy were gone and we couldn't use Scarecrow or Riddler, so we were left with: Luthor (who kind of counted as Brainiac), Bizarro, Giganta, Cheetah, Sinestro and Toyman. And no, I couldn't keep all 13 straight two years later without referring to my script and Wikipedia. — Matt Wayne (dcanimated.com))
- The Legion of Doom appear in the Batman: The Brave and the Bold episode "Triumvirate of Terror!", consisting of Lex Luthor, Joker, Cheetah, Weather Wizard, Felix Faust, and Amazo.
- The Legion of Doom appear in the Robot Chicken DC Comics Special, consisting of the original thirteen Legionnaires, Joker, Penguin, mailroom worker Glen, Aquaman, Bane, Catwoman, Two-Face, Icicle, Mirror Master, Harley Quinn, Deathstroke, Mr. Freeze, Mister Banjo, Chillblaine, Darkseid, and Robot Chicken original character Humping Robot.
- In the Teen Titans Go! episode "Snuggle Time", the Teen Titans decide to become supervillains and become the "Legion of Doooom", with Starfire becoming Starfire the Terrible, Cyborg becoming The Cyborg, Raven becoming the Demon of Azarath, Robin becoming Dick Gravestone, and Beast Boy becoming Beast Monster.
- The Legion of Doom appear in Robot Chicken DC Comics Special 2: Villains in Paradise, consisting of Lex Luthor, Bizarro, Poison Ivy, Black Manta, Joker, Penguin, Brainiac, Captain Cold, Scarecrow, Gorilla Grodd, Sinestro, Catwoman, Riddler, Toyman, and Two-Face as prominent members as well as Weather Wizard, Black Adam, Darkseid, Harley Quinn, Mr. Freeze, Professor Zoom, Starro, Killer Croc, and Clayface, who make cameo appearances.
- The Legion of Doom appear in Robot Chicken DC Comics Special III: Magical Friendship, consisting of Lex Luthor, Sinestro, Two-Face, Poison Ivy, Catwoman, Penguin, and Joker. Additionally, multiple incarnations of the Legion from across the multiverse appear as well.
- The Legion of Doom appears in the second season of Legends of Tomorrow, consisting of the Reverse-Flash, Damien Darhk, Malcolm Merlyn, and a time-displaced Captain Cold. Additionally, they are assisted by a brainwashed Rip Hunter and a reluctant Heat Wave. This version of the group received their name from Legends member Nate Heywood after a cartoon he enjoyed as a child and seek the Spear of Destiny to alter their fates. Despite succeeding, they are betrayed by Heat Wave and defeated by the Legends, who allow the Black Flash to erase the Reverse-Flash from existence before returning the other Legionnaires to the points in time that Thawne pulled them from with no memory of their time with the Legion.
- The Legion of Doom appear in Harley Quinn, led by Lex Luthor and consisting of the Joker, Scarecrow, Cheetah, Bane, Gorilla Grodd, Black Manta, Sinestro, Black Adam, Reverse-Flash, Toyman, Solomon Grundy, Metallo, Captain Cold, Parasite, Riddler, Penguin, Two-Face, Man-Bat, Calendar Man, Killer Croc, Killer Frost, Felix Faust, Livewire, Maxie Zeus, Snowflame, Doctor Trap, Firefly, Volcana, Terra, Tefé, and the Cock King. Additionally, Doctor Psycho was originally a member before he was ousted from the group for calling Wonder Woman and Giganta the "C word" on live television, which led to him siding with Harley Quinn, who seeks to join the Legion throughout the first season. This version of the group is based in Gotham and is described as a supportive community of elite supervillains dedicated to making the world a horrible place, having been behind some of the most evil plots in the 21st century. In the episode "The Horse and the Sparrow", Luthor approaches Poison Ivy with an offer to lead the Legion in exchange for eliminating the Joker. Despite failing the mission, she agrees, recruiting Nora Fries as her assistant, King Shark as the head of the IT department, Jim Gordon as a security guard, and Frank the Plant as well. In "Getting Ice Dick, Don't Wait Up", Ivy takes on Volcana, Terra, and Tefé as her mentees, the Natural Disasters.
  - The Legion of Doom appear in Kite Man: Hell Yeah!.

=== Film ===
- The Legion of Doom appears in Justice League: Doom, led by Vandal Savage and consisting of Cheetah, Star Sapphire, Metallo, Bane, Mirror Master, and Ma'alefa'ak.
- The Legion of Doom appears in JLA Adventures: Trapped in Time, consisting of Lex Luthor, Cheetah, Solomon Grundy, Toyman, Bizarro, Captain Cold, Black Manta and Gorilla Grodd. After Lex's misadventure with abusing Time Trapper's powers to eliminate Superman and Wonder Woman, Grodd takes control of the Legion.
- The Legion of Doom appears in Lego DC Comics Super Heroes: Justice League: Attack of the Legion of Doom, consisting of Lex Luthor, Cheetah, Captain Cold, Sinestro, Black Manta, and Gorilla Grodd. Additionally, Joker, Penguin, Man-Bat, Giganta, and Deathstroke appear as rejected members. This version of the group was formed by Luthor on Darkseid's orders.
- The Legion of Doom appears in Justice League vs. Teen Titans, consisting of Lex Luthor, Toymaster, Cheetah, Weather Wizard, and Solomon Grundy.
- The Legion of Doom appears in Lego DC Super Hero Girls: Super-Villain High, consisting of Lena Luthor and Lashina while Harley Quinn, Catwoman, Poison Ivy, Frost, and Cheetah join temporarily.
- The Legion of Doom appears in Teen Titans Go! & DC Super Hero Girls: Mayhem in the Multiverse, consisting of Lex Luthor, Cythonna, Riddler, Solomon Grundy, Toyman, Giganta, Catwoman, Poison Ivy, Livewire, Star Sapphire, Cheetah, and Harley Quinn.
- The Legion of Doom appear in a poster depicted in Scooby-Doo! and Krypto, Too!, consisting of Lex Luthor, Riddler, Cheetah, Sinestro, and Gorilla Grodd. Additionally, Giganta and the Joker are stated to be former members and Harley Quinn an associate.

=== Video games ===
- The Hall of Doom appears in DC Universe Online.
- The Legion of Doom appear as playable characters in Lego Batman 3: Beyond Gotham, consisting of Lex Luthor, Joker, Cheetah, Firefly, Killer Croc, and Solomon Grundy.
- The Legion of Doom appear as playable characters in Lego DC Super-Villains, consisting of Lex Luthor, Mercy Graves, the Rookie, Cheetah, Solomon Grundy, Joker, Harley Quinn, Clayface, Riddler, Scarecrow, Catwoman, Two-Face, Penguin, Captain Cold, Heat Wave, Mirror Master, Captain Boomerang, Malcolm Merlyn, Reverse-Flash, Killer Frost, Deadshot, Poison Ivy, Livewire, Gorilla Grodd, Sinestro, Black Adam, Deathstroke, Metallo, Firefly, Clock King, Kite Man, Polka-Dot Man, Bronze Tiger, Doctor Poison, Calendar Man, an unidentified OMAC Operative, Psycho-Pirate, and Condiment King.

=== Miscellaneous ===
- The Legion of Doom appears in The Aquaman & Friends Action Hour as bankrupt enemies of Aquaman.
- The Legion of Doom appears in a Six Flags New England live show written by Brandon T. Snider, consisting of Lex Luthor, Joker, Riddler, Cheetah, Captain Cold, and Sinestro.
- The Legion of Doom appears in the opening sequence for DC Super Friends: The Joker's Playhouse.
- Cryptozoic Entertainment released a Kickstarter-exclusive expansion pack for its DC Deck-Building Game Justice League Dark featuring the original Hanna-Barbera Legion of Doom.
- The Ladies of Doom, a group inspired by the Legion of Doom, appears in the Harley Quinn tie-in comic Harley Quinn: The Animated Series - Legion of Bats!, consisting of Knockout, Livewire, Nightfall, Porcelain, and Queen Bee. By the series' end, all but Porcelain and Queen Bee resign from the group.

== In popular culture ==
- In the 1990s, the Philadelphia Flyers forward line of John LeClair, Eric Lindros, and Mikael Renberg was nicknamed the Legion of Doom.
- Professional wrestling manager Paul Ellering named his wrestling stable the Legion of Doom after the supervillain group, eventually using the name to refer to his chief – and later sole – protégés, the tag team of The Road Warriors. When the Road Warriors arrived in the World Wrestling Federation in 1990, they changed their team name to the Legion of Doom.
- An episode of The Drew Carey Show featured Drew and his friends getting in trouble being a "gang". Drew gets sent to a counseling session for gangbangers and enters the room to see a group of imposing bikers and gang members sitting around a large table. He quips "the reason I've called you all here is to destroy Superman" as Lex Luthor would do when leading a Legion meeting.
- The Super Friends incarnation of the Legion of Doom appears in the Family Guy episode "It Takes a Village Idiot, and I Married One".
- In the Harvey Birdman, Attorney at Law episode "Peanut Puberty", the headquarters for the Legion of Doom was used for a club called the "Legion of Dance".
- The first episode of Season 3 of Duck Dodgers titled "Till Doom Do Us Part" featured the Legion of Duck Doom, led by Agent Roboto and was composed of various villains from the earlier seasons made up of Crusher, Fudd, a Catapoid, Count Muerte, New Cadet, Nasty Canasta, Commandante Hilgalgo, Baby-Faced Moonbeam, Long John Silver the 23rd, K'chutha Sa'am, and Tasmanian Warrior. A new villain that is part of the Legion of Duck Doom named Black Eel (a parody of Black Manta) makes his first appearance in this episode.
- In the Aqua Teen Hunger Force episode "The Last One", the Mooninites assemble a group akin to the Legion of Doom consisting of past antagonists Rabbot, Mothmonsterman, Happy Time Harry, Cybernetic Ghost of Christmas Past from the Future, Travis of the Cosmos, Randy the Astonishing, the Brownie Monsters, Romulox, MC Pee Pants's worm, the Trees, Frat Aliens, Oog, Dumbassahedratron, Ol'Drippy, and Major Shake. However, almost all of them are killed or asked to leave.
- In the Venture Brothers episode "It Happening One Night", Dr. Venture is blackmailed by The Doom Factory, a mash-up parody of the Doom Patrol mixed with Andy Warhol's Factory and the Warhol Superstars.
- In the Smallville episode "Prophecy", a similar group was named Marionette Ventures and under control of Toyman. Its members included Black Manta, Solomon Grundy, Metallo, Roulette, Vordigan, and Captain Cold.
- In the Krypto the Superdog episode "Mechanikalamity", the Intergalactic Villains Club that Mechanicat is a part of is a spoof of the Legion of Doom.
- The music video for the song "P.I.M.P." by rappers 50 Cent, Snoop Dogg, Lloyd Banks and Young Buck features 50 Cent seeking the join the "P.I.M.P. Legion of Doom" who are led by Snoop Dogg. The P.I.M.P Legion of Doom gathers around a round table and the pros and cons of 50 Cent joining their group. Despite not having a Cadillac or a perm, 50 Cent becomes a member by pleasing its members upon showing them his "magic stick".
- In Johnny Test, the Evil Johnny Stopping Force Five have a secret base in a swamp that closely resembles the Legion of Doom's secret headquarters.
- The song "Trap or Die" by rap artists Young Jeezy and Bun B contains the lyric "I've got my own Super Friends in a Legion of Doom", referencing the DC characters.
- In the early to mid 2010s, the Seattle Seahawks defense was nicknamed the Legion of Boom, a play on the villain group's name.
- In the New Orleans region of CLUBWAKA (World Adult Kickball Association), there is a team named Legion of Doom. Their colors are orange and black and they use a logo that incorporates the Hall of Doom in the imagery. Each member of the team chooses a villain from the DC roster, and one game a season they dress as their villainous alter egos while challenging their opponents to dress in costumes as DC heroes.
- President Donald Trump's ordered assassination of Qasem Soleimani outside of Baghdad International Airport resulted in Fox News reporting Trump had taken out "the legion of doom".

== See also ==
- Legion of Zoom
