= Mongul =

Comic book supervillain

- Mongul as depicted in DC Comics Presents #28 (December 1980). Art by Jim Starlin (pencils), Romeo Tanghal (inks), and Jerry Serpre (colors).

Publication information
- Publisher: DC Comics
- First appearance: DC Comics Presents #27 (November 1980)
- Created by: Len Wein (writer); Jim Starlin (writer/artist)

In-story information
- Species: Unknown
- Place of origin: Warworld / Debstam IV
- Team affiliations: (Mongul); Injustice League; Superman Revenge Squad; Suicide Squad (Mongul II); Sinestro Corps
- Partnerships: Hank Henshaw; Non; Draaga
- Abilities: Superhuman strength, speed, stamina, agility, and durability; Near-invulnerability; Teleportation; Energy projection; Heat vision; Anatomical liberation; Skilled hand-to-hand combatant; Genius-level intellect; Access to Warworld

Mongul (/ˈmɒŋɡəl/) is a supervillain appearing in American comic books published by DC Comics. Writer Len Wein and artist Jim Starlin created the first version of the character, who debuted in DC Comics Presents #27 (November 1980). Jerry Ordway created the second version, who first appeared in The Adventures of Superman #454 as the lord of Warworld. He was later embellished by Peter Tomasi and Scot Eaton in Showcase '95, #8. He is based on the Mongol Empire's founder Genghis Khan and his successors, hence his name. The character was given an origin story and a character study in New 52 Villains Month Green Lantern #23.2 by his co-creator Jim Starlin and artist Howard Porter. This issue blended elements from Mongul's origin story in Showcase '95 with the classic story For the Man Who Has Everything using the Black Mercy , as an homage to the writers who helped develop the character. He has become one of Superman's most enduring enemies, belonging to the collective of adversaries that make up his rogues gallery. Mongul and his successors also became enemies with the Green Lantern Corps.

Debuting in the Bronze Age of Comic Books, Mongul has been featured in other DC Comics-endorsed products such as animated series, video games, a direct-to-DVD film, and merchandise such as action figures and trading cards.

== Publication history ==
Mongul debuted in the title DC Comics Presents and was created by writer Len Wein and artist Jim Starlin. Starlin often receives credit as creator of the character, but Wein in an interview stated: "Well, [Mongul] had Starlin visuals, but he was my creation". Wein said he conceived Mongul specifically as a villain to physically challenge Superman. Starlin commented on the character as well stating, "When I went over to DC... I went over and created Mongul and he was definitely supposed to be Thanos in the DC universe"

== Fictional character biography ==
Mongul was the ruler of his species until he was overthrown in a revolution and forced to flee. In his first appearance, Mongul kidnaps Superman's friends (Lois Lane, Jimmy Olsen, and Steve Lombard), threatening to kill them unless the hero brings him a key that can activate the artificial planet Warworld. After Superman retrieves the key, Mongul activates Warworld. Psychically linked with its controls, Mongul tries to destroy Superman and Supergirl. Mongul is rendered unconscious by the mental strain caused from using its controls, but manages to escape before the heroes destroy Warworld.

Mongul then tries to conquer Throneworld, the home planet of Prince Gavyn. Mongul murders Gavyn's sister and forces Gavyn's lover into marrying him to usurp the throne of the empire for himself. He uses Throneworld's planet-destroying weapon to blackmail other planets into obedience. Superman arrives and battles Mongul, while Starman disables the weapon. Mongul retreats as soon as the weapon is disabled, planning to make his next move. Now wanting revenge on Superman, Mongul kills a Controller and steals a Sun-Eater to devour the Earth's Sun. While the Justice League and Legion of Super-Heroes battle Mongul, Superman finally defeats him as the Legion destroys the Sun-Eater.

Mongul attacks Superman on his birthday and ensnares him with Black Mercy, an alien plant that feeds off a victim's "bio-aura" and subdues them with visions of their ideal world. Meanwhile, Mongul nearly kills Wonder Woman while mocking her views that women are equal. In the end, thanks to Batman, Robin, and Wonder Woman, Mongul falls victim to the plant, receiving visions of being dictator of the universe.

=== Modern Age (1985–present) ===
Following the limited series Crisis on Infinite Earths, which rebooted DC's continuity, Mongul is reintroduced as the ruler of Warworld, a space empire where he entertains the citizens with gladiatorial games. Mongul's ship captures a dying Superman, who was floating adrift in outer space after he exiled himself from Earth, and Mongul decides to use him in the games, but Superman joins forces with Mongul's champion Draaga and makes Mongul flee. Mongul is then persuaded via torture to serve the Cyborg Superman to gain vengeance on Superman and to try to turn the Earth into another Warworld. In the process, Green Lantern Hal Jordan's home, Coast City, is destroyed, which leads to him joining Superman and his allies to defeat Mongul.

During the Underworld Unleashed storyline, the demon Neron offers various supervillains enhanced power in exchange for their souls. Mongul's pride causes him to decline the offer and threaten Neron. In response, Neron beats Mongul to death for his defiance, taking his soul in the process.

==== Son of Mongul ====
Mongul II as depicted in Green Lantern Secret Files and Origins 2005, art by Dave Gibbons and Peter Steigerwald

Mongul the Elder had twin children who survived: a boy and a girl. Both shared a strong sibling rivalry. The first, Mongal, was known for her physical strength, while the second, Mongul, was more rational than his sister. Mongul's son, also named Mongul, watched digital renderings of his father's battles with Superman and the destruction of Coast City. He copies his father's actions when he encounters a group of aliens whose spaceship crashes on Arkymandryte, turning them into his slaves. Mongul's father returns, and discovering his son's slaves, he kills the aliens and tells him only one being on the planet is worthy of adoration.

Mongul's son appears to assist and train Superman in preparation for the arrival of Imperiex. He is apparently killed during the Our Worlds at War storyline, but returns during Infinite Crisis. He seeks out Mongal to settle family squabbles. Stating family to be a weakness, Mongul kills Mongal with a single blow to her head.

Mongul receives a Yellow Power Ring after breaking a dying Sinestro Corps member's neck and takes over the Sinestro Corps. Following an unsuccessful attempt to invade Daxam, Mongul takes the Sinestro Corps to Korugar, Sinestro's homeworld. Soon after, Sinestro is brought to Korugar and confronts Mongul, imprisoning him in the Sinestro Corps' Central Power Battery and reclaiming control of the Corps.

Sinestro regains his Corps in Green Lantern (vol. 4) #46, art by Doug Mahnke and Christian Alamy

=== The New 52 ===
In The New 52, a 2011 reboot of the DC Comics universe, the original Mongul is reintroduced. In his introduction, he is laying waste to a planet he is poised to conquer as he brought a resisting general aboard his vessel to show him the devastation of his homeworld just before killing him and adding his remains to a trophy room on Warworld. After being deposed by Sinestro, Mongul allies with the Pale Vicars, a group who loot planets and nullify their inhabitants' emotions. Mongul is later killed and succeeded by his son, Mongul MDCCXCII.

== Powers and abilities ==
Mongul possesses immense superhuman physical abilities comparable to Superman. He can teleport, generate energy blasts, possesses limited telepathy and telekinesis, and wields a chest-mounted cannon. For a time, Mongul was also part of the Sinestro Corps and possessed the ability to create energy constructs and empower himself via fear. As a Pale Vicor, Mongul can negate the powers of the emotional spectrum and generate a protective aura.

== In other media ==
=== Television ===
Mongul as depicted in Batman: The Brave and the Bold.

- Mongul appears in the DC Animated Universe series Justice League and Justice League Unlimited, voiced by Eric Roberts.
- Mongul appears in Batman: The Brave and the Bold, voiced by Gary Anthony Williams.
- Mongul appears in Young Justice, voiced by Keith David.
- Mongul appears in the Justice League Action episode "Galaxy Jest", voiced by John DiMaggio.

=== Film ===
- Mongul appears in Superman/Batman: Public Enemies, voiced by Bruce Timm.
- Mongul appears in Justice League: Warworld, voiced by Robin Atkin Downes.

=== Video games ===
- Mongul appears in Superman: The Man of Steel, voiced by J.S. Gilbert.
- Mongul appears in Superman Returns, voiced by Todd Williams.
- Mongul appears in Batman: The Brave and the Bold – The Videogame, voiced again by Gary Anthony Williams.
- Mongul appears as a character summon in Scribblenauts Unmasked: A DC Comics Adventure.
- Mongul appears as a playable character in Lego DC Super-Villains, voiced by Fred Tatasciore.

== Reception ==
In 2009, Mongul was ranked as IGN's 41st Greatest Comic Book Villain of All Time.
