= Superman: The Man of Steel (2002 video game) =

- Developer: Circus Freak Studios
- Publisher: Infogrames (Note: Released under the Atari brand name.)
- Platform: Xbox
- Release: NA: November 12, 2002; EU: December 13, 2002
- Genre: Action-adventure
- Mode: Single-player

Superman: The Man of Steel is an action-adventure video game for Xbox, based on DC Comics' character Superman. It was developed by Circus Freak, and published by Infogrames under the Atari brand name and released in conjunction with Warner Bros. Interactive Entertainment and DC Comics. It is based on the comic book mythos, as opposed to most other Superman games which are adaptations of the character in other mediums besides the source material. The game was released in North America on November 12, 2002 and in Europe on December 13, 2002.

== Gameplay ==
Many portions of the game are given a time limit within which the players must complete several objectives. One common theme through the game across several levels requires Superman to travel through large distances across Metropolis in order to put out a series of fires with his freeze breath. Other scenarios within the city call for Superman to rescue civilians by transporting from an endangered area to a safer location, pursue and grab an enemy's getaway vehicle and take it to the authorities, and fight hordes of robots invading the city from Brainiac 13. Several enemies, particularly the robots, have a color-coded reticle through the targeting system, indicating that enemy's particular vulnerability. A yellow reticle on an enemy means that he is vulnerable to physical/melee attack, a blue reticle means that they are vulnerable to Superman's freeze breath, and a purple reticle means that the enemy is susceptible to Superman's heat vision.

Bizarro is the game's first boss, and the first portion of the level against him requires the player to chase him through the city and extinguish fires he causes. The boss battle itself follows a formula of attacking while Bizarro flexes, and he is easily defeated by dividing attacks between offensive powers and melee attacks. From here the game then moves to Brainiac himself, requiring Superman to use his X-ray vision and cut off power to the villain's shield. The X-ray vision is rendered into the map, allowing it to see beneath the surface of Metropolis and trace the power sources for Superman to disrupt. Many levels take place outside of Metropolis, but the scenarios tend to repeat themselves. On Mongul's Warworld for instance, the player may be required to save detainees from Mongul's prison, which follow the same gameplay method of saving civilians in Metropolis. Fighting the guards from the prison in the air follows the same method as fighting Brainiac's robots in Metropolis, although on Warworld the players are tasked with seeking and destroying several of Mongul's ships with heat vision. The Warworld level finishes with Superman moving giant rune stones in order to locate a powerful device of Mongul's, before heading into space.

In space above Warworld, it is required to save a fleeing prisoner ship by destroying the giant laser turrets on the side of Mongul's mother ship. After this, the players are tasked with transferring the mother ship's power supply to the prisoner ship while fending off Mongul's guards. This is all entirely achieved through flight and through a fast pace. After stopping Mongul's ship from escaping to destroy Earth, Superman returns to Metropolis to battle Metallo, first needing to rescue several civilians and put out several fires before moving to face him.

=== Abilities ===
Many of Superman's abilities are at the player's immediate disposal. Flight and super strength are inherent, super hearing assists with the game's radar system, X-ray vision is important for searching for bombs or other weapons, and freeze breath is widely used for putting out fires.

Heat vision is mostly used for enemies that have a vulnerability to heat. Super speed has a presence while flying, creating a red and blue streak behind Superman as he flies at the game's allowable top speed.

== Plot ==
The story flows out of events outlined in Superman: Y2K, in which futuristic villain Brainiac 13 injected Metropolis with a technological virus. Superman was able to prevent it from spreading, but as a result of it, the city was upgraded into a true "City of Tomorrow". Huge high-tech buildings soar into the sky while hover cars and the Rail Whale bullet train travel throughout the city.

As the game begins, Brainiac 13 has decided to return to Metropolis and harvest the technology that is residing in the city. This results in massive chaos and danger that Superman must stop. The game moves from areas such as the city of Metropolis, orbit above Earth, a deep space asteroid field, the villain Mongul's Warworld, and the Phantom Zone. The story was written by veteran DC Comics writer Scott Peterson, who also co-wrote the story for the later DC Comics video game Batman: Dark Tomorrow.

Villains in the game include Brainiac 13, Lex Luthor, Mongul, Metallo, Bizarro, and Cyborg Superman.

== Reception ==
Reception

Aggregate scores
Aggregator	Score
GameRankings	42.28%
Metacritic	44/100

Review scores
Publication	Score
1Up.com	D+
AllGame	1.5/5
Electronic Gaming Monthly	3.5/10
Game Informer	4.75/10
GamePro	2/5
GameSpot	6.4/10
GameZone	4.9/10
IGN	4.7/10
Official Xbox Magazine (US)	5.8/10
X-Play	2/5
Entertainment Weekly	D−
Maxim	4/10

The game received mixed-to-negative reviews, with many citing a confusing control scheme and repetitive mission modes. GameRankings gave it a score of 42.28%, while Metacritic gave it a score of 44 out of 100. IGN called the game "pure kryptonite", and was critical to the game's controls.

GameSpot was kinder to the game, praising the story, the large and detailed environments, and the use of the character's special abilities like X-ray vision. Conversely, they called the enemy lock-on system "problematic" and the game's repetitive timed missions as difficult to complete because of the player's relatively low top speed and low amount of time to complete certain objectives.
