= Livewire (DC Comics) =

DC Comics supervillain

- Livewire on the cover art of Action Comics #835, art by Kalman Andrasofszky.

Publication information
- Publisher: DC Comics
- First appearance: Superman: The Animated Series "Livewire"
- First comic appearance: Superman Adventures #5 (1997); Action Comics #835 (March 2006)
- Created by: Evan Dorkin; Sarah Dyer; Bruce Timm

In-story information
- Alter ego: Leslie Willis
- Species: Metahuman
- Team affiliations: Superman Revenge Squad; Supermen of America; Legion of Doom; Secret Society of Super Villains
- Abilities: Electrokinesis; Electron reconstruction; Energy absorption; Electro-blast; Intangibility and phasing; Superhuman strength when fully charged

Livewire is a supervillain appearing in multimedia produced by DC Entertainment, and American comic books published by DC Comics. Created for Superman: The Animated Series, the character appeared in March 1997 in Superman Adventures #5 (based on the animated series). Her first mainstream comic book appearance was in DC Comics' Action Comics #835 (March 2006).

In animation, the character was voiced by Lori Petty in Superman: The Animated Series and The New Batman Adventures, and by Maria Canals-Barrera in Justice League. In live-action, she has been portrayed by Anna Mae Routledge in Smallville and Brit Morgan in the Arrowverse series Supergirl.

== Fictional character biography ==
=== DC Animated Universe ===
Livewire, in Superman: The Animated Series.

Introduced in a self-titled episode of Superman: The Animated Series, Leslie Willis is a popular, yet controversial Metropolis radio shock jock who takes cynical joy in ridiculing Superman during her broadcasts. On the third anniversary of her career, she hosts a rock concert at Centennial Park to celebrate despite a concurrent thunderstorm and public safety concerns. Willis is electrocuted by a lightning strike that was conducted through Superman's body, giving her the metahuman ability to manipulate electricity.

In the Justice League episode "Hereafter", Livewire (voiced by an uncredited Maria Canals-Barrera) joins the Superman Revenge Squad, only to be defeated by the Justice League. In Justice League Unlimited, she joins Gorilla Grodd's Secret Society.

Livewire also appears in the Superman Adventures tie-in comic, where she works with Professor Hamilton to stop Brainiac and eventually reforms.

=== Comics ===
Leslie Willis / Livewire is introduced into the main comics continuity in Action Comics #835 (March 2006), written by Gail Simone and John Byrne. This version is a metahuman who was born with superhuman abilities and was originally a radio host who was fired when Miguel, the owner of the station she broadcasts on, decides to turn the station into a country station. Enraged at the loss of her job, she goes to the top of the station, where it was struck by lightning. Absorbing a large amount of energy from the lightning bolt, Willis gains chalk-white skin and blue hair and decides to take her revenge out on Superman.

Livewire and many other metahumans are kidnapped by a being called the Auctioneer. This being scours the universe looking for unique items to acquire (often by theft) before selling them to the highest bidder. Livewire's unique powers allow her, Superman and several other captives to escape their containment fields. She teams up with Nightwing, Superman, the Veteran, Blue Jay and other heroes in fleeing their situation and gaining information. A dampening field provides a psychological barrier against utilizing their powers. With the help of Mister Terrific, who communicates through Livewire's natural electricity, the field is soon neutralized.

During the escape attempt, Livewire accidentally creates a link between the makeshift team and every single television on Earth. This proves hard to shut off. Soon, the team confronts the Auctioneer. With great difficulty, Livewire gains control over the being's communication systems. Under Superman's suggestions, they threaten to broadcast the Auctioneer's entire database to every alien system possible unless he agrees to release the heroes and leave Earth alone. He reluctantly does so and returns everyone to Earth.

In Superman: Grounded, Livewire attacks Jimmy Olsen and takes hostages in Las Vegas to get Superman's attention. It is subsequently revealed that Livewire's powers are deteriorating and she can no longer control them safely. Superman gives Livewire a containment suit, which returns her power levels to normal. Livewire is arrested, but does not receive a hard sentence as she only damaged property, no one was wounded, and Superman spoke on her behalf. Iron Munro also chooses to use his influence in the justice department to help. With the help of Iron Munro and Serling Roquette, Livewire is declared reformed and is recruited into the Supermen of America.

==== The New 52 ====
In 2011, "The New 52" rebooted the DC universe. Livewire appears as a member of the Secret Society of Super Villains after the events of the "Forever Evil" storyline. Her origin is later given in an issue of Batgirl, where it is revealed that Leslie Willis was once a popular vlogger known for her pranks and makeup tutorials. During a stunt where she tried to reroute all the power in the city to spell out a dirty message that would be visible from space, she was accidentally electrocuted, granting her superhuman abilities.

== Powers and abilities ==
Livewire is a being of pure electricity able to absorb vast quantities from external sources. She can also manipulate electricity and generate lightning blasts of various intensities, with her strongest being able to weaken or stun Superman. She can also transform into living electricity to travel through electric currents and control electronic devices.

Due to her powers, her primary weakness is water, as even a small amount will cause her stored energy to go haywire unless she has stored up enough power. At this or any stage, Livewire would have to be completely drenched in water to be fully depowered. Additionally, silicon dust can also render her powerless due to its electrical resistance. When drained of her electricity, she reverts to her solid form and cannot use most of her abilities until she absorbs enough energy.

== In other media ==
=== Television ===
==== Animation ====
- Livewire makes a non-speaking cameo appearance in the Teen Titans Go! episode "Black Friday".
- A teenage Livewire appears in Young Justice, voiced by Britt Baron. This version is a member of the Outsiders.
- Livewire appears in DC Super Hero Girls, voiced by Mallory Low. This version is a teenage bully, internet troll, and member of the Super Villain Girls.
- Livewire appears in Harley Quinn, voiced by Aline Elasmar. This version is a member of the Legion of Doom.
  - Livewire makes non-speaking cameo appearances in Kite Man: Hell Yeah!.
- Livewire appears in My Adventures with Superman, voiced by Zehra Fazal. This version is a thief whose powers are initially derived from a special harness powered by an alien crystal before she later develops natural electrokinesis. Additionally, as of the episode "Olsen's Eleven", she has entered a relationship with Heat Wave.
- Livewire appears in Bat-Fam, voiced by Lori Alan.

==== Live-action ====
Anna Mae Routledge as Livewire on Smallville.

Brit Morgan as Livewire on Supergirl.

- Livewire appears in the Smallville episode "Injustice", portrayed by an uncredited Anna Mae Routledge. This version is a small-time crook who, after being incarcerated, is recruited by Tess Mercer and tasked with searching for Davis Bloome alongside Parasite, Neutron, Plastique, and Mercer's assistant Eva Greer. Livewire is later killed by an explosive implanted in her head off-screen.
- Livewire appears in Supergirl, portrayed by Brit Morgan. This version is a confident yet abrasive CatCo shock jock who acquires her powers after Supergirl, whom she had repeatedly denigrated on her radio show, is struck by lightning while rescuing her from a potential helicopter crash. Introduced in her self-titled episode, Livewire attempts to seek revenge on Cat Grant for demoting her, only to be defeated by Supergirl and turned over to the Department of Extranormal Operations (DEO)'s custody. In the episode "Worlds Finest", Silver Banshee breaks Livewire out of the DEO to help her kill Grant, Supergirl, and Kara Danvers. However, the pair are foiled by Supergirl, a dimensionally-displaced Flash, and a group of firefighters and incarcerated at National City's newly developed metahuman prison. In "We Can Be Heroes", scientist Dr. Hampton kidnaps Livewire in an attempt to steal her powers and create an army of electricity-powered super-soldiers, but she escapes with Supergirl's help and they form a truce. In "Fort Rozz", Livewire agrees to help Supergirl and Psi on a mission to the titular prison to gather information on Reign and later dies saving Supergirl.

=== Film ===
- An alternate reality variant of Livewire appears in Justice League: Gods and Monsters, voiced by Kari Wahlgren. This version is a human terrorist who wields an electric beam gun.
- Livewire makes a non-speaking appearance in Teen Titans Go! & DC Super Hero Girls: Mayhem in the Multiverse as a member of the Legion of Doom.

=== Video games ===
- Livewire appears as a boss in Superman: Shadow of Apokolips, voiced again by Lori Petty.
- Livewire appears as a boss in Superman: Countdown to Apokolips.
- Livewire appears in DC Universe Online.
- Livewire appears as a character summon in Scribblenauts Unmasked: A DC Comics Adventure.
- Livewire appears as a playable character in DC Legends.
- Livewire appears in Lego DC Super-Villains, voiced by Cree Summer.
- Livewire appears as a boss in DC Super Hero Girls: Teen Power, voiced again by Mallory Low.

=== Miscellaneous ===
- Livewire appears in DC Universe Online: Legends #9 as an associate of Brainiac.
- Livewire appears in the Injustice: Gods Among Us prequel comic.
- Livewire appears in the Harley Quinn tie-in comics Harley Quinn: The Animated Series: The Eat. Bang! Kill. Tour and Harley Quinn: The Animated Series: Legion of Bats.

== See also ==
- List of Superman enemies
- Superman: The Animated Series
- DC Animated Universe
