= Superman Returns (video game) =

2006 video game

- North American Xbox cover art
- Developer: EA Tiburon
- Publishers: Electronic Arts; Warner Bros. Interactive Entertainment
- Producers: Gary Sheinwald; David Abrams
- Artist: Mathias Lorenz
- Writers: Marv Wolfman; Flint Dille
- Composer: Colin O'Malley
- Platforms: Nintendo DS, PlayStation 2, Xbox, Xbox 360
- Release: NA: November 20, 2006; AU: November 30, 2006; UK: November 24, 2006
- Genre: Action
- Mode: Single-player

Superman Returns is a 2006 open world action video game based on the 2006 movie of the same name. It was developed by EA Tiburon and co-published by Electronic Arts and Warner Bros. Interactive Entertainment in conjunction with DC Comics. It was released for PlayStation 2, Xbox, Xbox 360, and Nintendo DS.

In the game, Superman combats Bizarro, as well as other classic villains (including Metallo, Mongul, and Riot) as well as being able to play as Bizarro in one of the minigames. The game features the voice and likeness of Brandon Routh (Superman / Clark Kent) as well as the voices of Kevin Spacey (Lex Luthor), Kate Bosworth (Lois Lane), Parker Posey (Kitty Kowalski) and Sam Huntington (Jimmy Olsen), all reprising their roles from the film.

== Gameplay ==
The game has an 80 sq. mile free-roaming map, and the character can fly into the stratosphere generated in the game surrounding the fictional city. Superman's complete array of superpowers is at the player's disposal, and the player is required to 'master' Superman's powers, because Superman might cause harm to the city if his powers are misused. If the player wishes to use heat vision, they must use the correct power level, for too much power can lead to civilian casualties and destruction. At the beginning of the game, players use the most basic forms of Superman's powers and must upgrade them to achieve greater strength, speed, distance, and damage.

As for flying in-game, the player can fly at different speeds, up to 800 mph, which is faster than the speed of sound. The faster Superman travels, the more the screen will blur. Each power will have different levels of energy.

In the main game, Superman is invincible: no matter what happens to Superman in the game, he cannot be killed. The one exception is during the second part of the tutorial mission, which is three boss fights in a row on War World, where Superman takes damage to the point of mission failure. Metropolis has a damage meter - if too much damage is done to the city during a mission (in other words, if the damage meter is fully depleted) then the game ends. Superman has a stamina meter that depletes as more power is used. The player can fly Superman into the atmosphere and absorb sunlight to replenish the stamina meter faster, as Superman has many times in comic books.

In the game, the player is challenged to be creative with Superman's powers. To stop a burning building, for example, Superman could use his freeze breath and risk not being able to save all of the civilian casualties in time, or he could pick up a fire truck and station it at a more convenient level (i.e., on top of a building adjacent to the burning one) for a faster extinguishing effect.

Amongst the various unlockables, there are alternate costumes (a 'Pod Suit' and 'Golden Age Suit' are featured in addition to the suit from the film). These costumes are accessed from the 'Fortress of Solitude' (the menu screen). A 'Bizarro' mode is also featured, where the player must destroy as much as they are told to in a limited time. There is also an unlockable 'Bizarro Rampage' mode that allows the player to cause havoc as Bizarro for an unlimited amount of time. This mode is accessible via a cheat code on the Superman Returns DVD.

Superman's famed x-ray vision is used automatically when Superman picks up an object. The object is made transparent to the player so it does not obstruct the player's view during gameplay.

== Plot ==
The story begins with Metropolis suffering a devastating meteor shower. Superman uses his full array of powers, including his strength, freeze breath, and heat vision to destroy the deadly rocks before they can strike the city.

Following this incident, astronomers announce that they have discovered the remains of the dead planet Krypton. Superman flies to the distant galaxy in the space rocket that his father sent him to Earth in to investigate the ruins of his homeworld and to see if there is anything left. He finds only gigantic, asteroid-sized chunks of kryptonite, pieces of the planet that were irradiated during the planet's destruction. Superman turns his ship around and heads back to Earth, but along the way he is intercepted by Mongul and forced to compete in gladiatorial combat in Warworld. Mongul first pits him against an elite team of warriors known as the Plahtune, but the Man of Steel easily beats them. Next, he confronts Overkhast, an alien who can fire energy from his hands and who can also transform into a gigantic energy-based creature that can emit shock waves of power. After Superman overcomes him, Mongul himself steps into the arena to battle Superman. Though he is powerful and possesses great strength, Mongul is still no match for Superman. At the conclusion of their fight, Superman picks up Mongul and prepares to deliver what would most certainly be a killing strike. Mongul taunts him, "Go on, Superman. You know you want to". Superman then throws Mongul to the floor and states that the fight is over. Superman then finds his ship and sets off for Earth, but Mongul vows that he will find him.

Superman's return to Metropolis is greeted with ecstatic applause by most, but Lois Lane seems somewhat hesitant to put her faith in him again. Soon after his return however, Metallo attacks the city with an army of robots when he hears Superman is back. He fights both the supervillain and his minions. While the lesser opponents are of little consequence to Superman, Metallo is another matter. After many fights, they have their last battle where Metallo transforms into a towering monstrosity that Superman cannot directly touch because of his kryptonite-powered body. He compensates for this by throwing objects at the villain. Realizing that he is about to be defeated, Metallo fires a large missile to destroy Metropolis, but Superman intercepts the projectile and hurls it into the sky. Superman shows Metallo no mercy, gathering all of his strength and charging the villain, tearing through his body and ripping out his power source.

Unknown to Superman during his absence, Lex Luthor broke into the Fortress of Solitude and stole his data crystals. Lex Luthor experiments with the crystals by adding a small particle to water, also causing an electromagnetic pulse that releases numerous villains and genetic creatures including Bizarro. Bizarro begins a rampage throughout Metropolis, destroying buildings and attacking citizens. Though Bizarro is of equal might, Superman is a much more experienced fighter. In the end, Superman defeats Bizarro, but does not kill him because he knows that the poor creature is incapable of understanding his actions.

Then Superman faces off against Riot and his clones in the Hyper Sector of Metropolis. Superman defeats Riot with a combination of his fists and freeze breath. No sooner has he defeated Riot then an old enemy returns for a rematch. Mongul and his minions have followed Superman to Earth. Superman battles Plahtune and Overkhast, and confronts Mongul afterward, once again. The fight is fierce, but as before Superman emerges victorious. Mongul admits that he is defeated and flees Earth.

Soon after, Lex Luthor has put his diabolical scheme of creating a new continent over America with the Kryptonian crystals into effect. Luthor plants the main crystal and an entire new landmass begins to form off the coast of Metropolis, which causes several tornadoes to form and tear through the city. Superman deflects the tornadoes and extinguishes the fires that have erupted throughout the city, then flies out over the water to investigate. He finds Luthor's boat sinking, the evil mastermind having abandoned it after planting the crystal. Lois had snuck onto the ship and is trapped as it is sinking, and Superman rescues her and takes her unconscious body to the coast guard. He then discovers the gigantic new island forming as a result of the crystal. Superman lands on the island and discovers too late that he has fallen into a trap, the island being laced with kryptonite. Luthor takes advantage of this to throw him into the ocean without his powers. Lois arrives with the coast guard and rescues her hero. Regained his powers, and strengthened by the sun's rays, Superman burrowing his way under the ocean floor and lifting the landmass directly out of the water and throwing it into space. Once again Superman beat Luthor and his evil plan, leave him alone on a dessert island.

Superman flies back to Metropolis to take care of the few remaining villains who earlier escaped him, ending the game.

== Reception ==
Reception

Aggregate scores
| Aggregator | Score |
|---|---|
| GameRankings | (Xbox) 54.18% (X360) 53.25% (PS2) 45.70% (DS) 31.92% |
| Metacritic | (Xbox) 51/100 (X360) 51/100 (PS2) 46/100 (DS) 33/100 |

Review scores
| Publication | Score |
|---|---|
| 1Up.com | D− |
| Edge | 3/10 |
| Electronic Gaming Monthly | 4.67/10 |
| Eurogamer | 3/10 |
| Game Informer | 6/10 |
| GamePro | 2.5/5 |
| GameRevolution | D |
| GameSpot | (X360) 4.5/10; 4.4/10 (DS) 2.3/10 |
| GameSpy | 3/5 |
| GameTrailers | 6.4/10 |
| GameZone | (X360) 7.7/10 (Xbox) 5/10 (DS) 4.3/10 |
| IGN | (X360) 5.5/10 (DS) 5.3/10 (Xbox) 5/10 (PS2) 4.8/10 |
| Official U.S. PlayStation Magazine | 3.5/10 |
| Official Xbox Magazine (US) | (X360) 6.5/10 (Xbox) 3/10 |
| The A.V. Club | D |

Superman Returns: The Video Game was received poorly. On the review aggregator GameRankings, it has a score of 31.92% for the DS version, 45.70% for the PS2 version, 54.18% for the Xbox version, and 53.25% for the Xbox 360 version; while it has Metacritic scores of 33 out of 100 for the DS version, 46 out of 100 for the PS2 version, and 51 out of 100 for both the Xbox and Xbox 360 versions.

IGN criticized the game's lack of a concluding villain saying that "the final boss in Superman Returns: The Videogame is a tornado. Not Lex Luthor. Not General Zod; not that Nuclear Man -- not even Richard Pryor. A tornado!"

Official PlayStation 2 Magazine UK gave the game a 5/10. Official Xbox Magazine gave the Xbox version of this game the award of "Best Graphics... if They Were on [the original PlayStation]" in the 2006 Game of The Year Awards. X-Play gave the Xbox 360 version a 1/5 for poor control, boring and bland enemies, and for featuring a tornado as the final boss.

The A.V. Club gave it a D and wrote that "a making-of documentary on how such a precious franchise was so flagrantly mishandled would be far more entertaining than anything the game has to offer".

It was reported to have sold 705,000 copies by 2008.

== Related games ==
A mobile phone game, also titled Superman Returns, was released in June 2006. It received a mediocre review score from IGN.

Superman Returns: Fortress of Solitude was released on November 28, 2006, for the Game Boy Advance. It features various puzzle challenges (one of which was Sudoku with superpowers) punctuated with short flying action sequences. The gameplay is a mixture of sorts between sudoku levels and battles that the player must do in order to advance through the game. GameSpot gave it a score of six out of ten, calling it "a passable puzzler that offers a decent selection of Sudoku-style puzzles".
