= Maxima (DC Comics) =

DC Comics character

- Maxima as depicted in Superman: The Man of Tomorrow #7 (December 1996). Art by Paul Ryan.

Publication information
- Publisher: DC Comics
- First appearance: Action Comics #645 (September 1989)
- Created by: Roger Stern (writer); George Pérez (artist)

In-story information
- Species: Almeracian
- Team affiliations: Justice League International; Extreme Justice; Superman Revenge Squad; Justice League
- Abilities: Superhuman strength, endurance, and speed; Invulnerability; Flight; Psychokinesis; Psychic bolts; Illusion casting; Mind control; Empathy; Telepathy; Teleportation; Telekinesis; Ferrokinesis; Ergokinesis; Hypnosis; Interstellar travel; Matter transmutation; Optic blasts; Force field generation

Maxima (/ˈmæksɪmə/) is a character appearing in American comic books published by DC Comics. She is a morally ambiguous queen, alien conqueror from the planet Almerac. Known for her obsession with Superman, she views him as the only man worthy to be her mate and king. Despite her beginnings as a despot, she later reformed herself to become a superheroine who has also served as a member of the Justice League.

In later stories it's revealed that the name "Maxima" is a title that can be used by different characters, sometimes at the same time.

Maxima has appeared in live-action TV shows Smallville portrayed by Charlotte Sullivan and by Eve Torres Gracie in Supergirl, and will appear in the DC Universe film Man of Tomorrow (2027) portrayed by Adria Arjona.

== Publication history ==
Maxima first appeared in Action Comics #645 (September 1989) and was created by writer Roger Stern and artist George Pérez.

== Fictional character biography ==
=== Post-Crisis ===
The oldest child of the royal family of the planet Almerac, the fiery-tempered Maxima came to Earth in search of a suitable mate to sire her heir, leaving behind her betrothed Ultraa. Maxima's first appearance in Metropolis was a simulacrum of her brought to Earth by her servant Sazu, who attempted to convince Superman to be her mate. The simulacrum was destroyed and Sazu was imprisoned. The real Maxima then appeared to free Sazu and came face to face with Superman. She and Superman, she argued, were genetically compatible; she could "give him what no Earth woman could - children". She was infuriated when Superman rejected her offer, saying he had no desire to father despots.

Maxima later reluctantly worked with Brainiac after he destroys Almerac. However, she eventually rebels against him and joins the Justice League. When the League helped her save Almerac from Starbreaker, the planet's ruling council exiled her. As a Leaguer, she helped in the fight against Doomsday, and when that version of the League disbanded, she became a member of Captain Atom's Extreme Justice. She considered Atom as a potential mate, but he was not interested. During the period of her flirtation with Atom, a jilted Ultraa angrily attacked him. Maxima eventually stopped the brawl and sent Ultraa back to Almerac. She later had a brief fling with another teammate, Amazing-Man, which lasted until the team was dissolved. While part of the Extreme Justice team, she joined with other heroes on a trip to Hell itself, mistakenly believing that Superman was trapped there. During the battle, Maxima fell and was lost in one of the 'nine rings'. She was sent back to Earth when Neron, the current ruler of Hell, was subdued.

She offered herself sexually to Superman again, hoping that her recent good deeds would offset her earlier ruthlessness. Superman, now married to Lois Lane, was even less interested in her proposal than before. Angry and humiliated, she joined the Superman Revenge Squad. She swore that Superman had rejected, humbled and humiliated her for the last time, and threatened that the next time they meet, it would truly be war.

During the buildup to the "Our Worlds at War" storyline, Maxima and the Chosen People of Almerac appear in Earth's Solar System, where they meet up with Superman. Maxima explains that she had been leading her people to safety from Imperiex, an entity who conquered Almerac. During the conflict with Imperiex, Maxima is killed stopping Brainiac from destroying the universe. Before dying, Maxima makes amends with Superman despite her animosity over his constant rejection of her.

=== The New 52 ===
In 2011, The New 52 rebooted the DC Universe. A younger, revamped Maxima is briefly introduced in Supergirl #36 as a member of the Crucible Academy, an intergalactic organization that trains its students to become their planets' protectors. She spends the next few issues bonding with Kara before eventually revealing in issue #40 that she is attracted to her. Maxima's homosexuality is the reason she left her home world and the demands of her culture to find an opposite-sex partner to produce children with. Additionally, "Maxima" is revealed to be a title rather than a name.

=== DC Rebirth ===
Maxima as seen in the interior artwork of Wonder Woman #754 (May 2020), art by Gleb Melnikov and Romulo Fajardo, Jr.

==== Superwoman ====
An older woman who resembles the more traditional pre-Flashpoint version of the character in both appearance and personality briefly appeared as a villain and usurped the title. This version was a former Almeracian soldier serving the true Maxima's mother who was disappointed with the younger Maxima's reluctance in finding a male mate on account of her homosexuality. Believing her unworthy of the Maxima title and her royal heritage, the usurper would kidnap the younger woman and attempt to take her place. The older impostor was eventually defeated and imprisoned by the combined might of Supergirl, Superwoman and the real Maxima.

=== DC All In ===
==== Superman: Hero for All ====
In the 2025 DC Treasury Edition oversized comic Superman: Hero for All, Maxima returns to Earth leading an invasion fleet in fury that Superman has married Lois Lane instead of her. With the aid of Cyborg Superman, she captures Superman and locks him into a mental fantasy world, while incapacitating or capturing all the rest of Earth's superheroes and causing massive destruction all over the world. Superman finally breaks free, rescues the other heroes and devastates Maxima's fleet, and both she and Cyborg Superman are captured and held awaiting trial.

== Personality and motivations ==
Overall, the portrayal of Maxima varied by writer. In her appearances in the various Superman titles, Maxima was a haughty and shallow individual with only self-centered motivations. By contrast, in her appearances in the comic book series Extreme Justice and Steel, Maxima was developed as an individual with a warrior's sense of honor and a strong countenance of noble pride that had its humorous moments in relation to other characters. This was evident during Extreme Justice #10 and #11, where Maxima hosted the bachelorette party for Captain Atom's fiancée, Plastique, wearing a stylish and elegant "red carpet" dress while everyone else wore jeans to the event that was held in the party room of a humble Tex-Mex restaurant. This occurred again in later issues of that series, where she is visibly uncomfortable from seeing newly joined members, Zan and Jayna, gorge themselves on junk food at a mall food court.

== Powers and abilities ==
As a scion of the Blood Royale of Almerac, Maxima commands a vast array of immense psionic powers that come from selective breeding and years of gene therapy which she can utilize in a variety of ways. In her first face to face encounter with Superman she displayed a high level of psionic powers, such as psychokinesis and seemingly hypnotic mind control. Maxima can use her psionic powers to give herself superhuman strength, enough to prove an effective opponent in hand-to-hand combat with a resurrected Superman or hold her own against the even stronger Doomsday. Maxima can increase her strength to an unlimited degree, pushing her past those in her tier. She also has enhanced stamina, as well as having such a degree of superhuman speed that she could easily move faster than the speed of light and proven herself to be able to keep up with speedsters such as the Flash. Through skillful application of her psionic powers, Maxima has been shown to emit powerful optical beams that can severely injure even Superman, take out Orion with one bolt, and she can create nearly impervious force fields. She is also capable of teleporting herself and others across vast distances, even from other worlds, which was demonstrated when she brought her adviser Sazu to Earth from a prison world. In the first battle with Doomsday in The Adventures of Superman #498, Maxima is the only one in that incarnation of the Justice League besides Superman who was able to hurt and withstand blows from Doomsday. Her various abilities make her a threat potentially for the entire Justice League.

== Other versions ==
An alternate universe version of Maxima appears in Armageddon 2001. This version married Superman following Lois Lane's death

== In other media ==
=== Television ===
Maxima as she appears in Superman: The Animated Series.

- A character based on Maxima named Neila appears in Superboy, portrayed by Christine Moore. She possesses superhuman strength, speed, and durability, pyrokinesis, the ability to alter her hair, and teleportation.
- Maxima appears in the Superman: The Animated Series episode "Warrior Queen", voiced by Sharon Lawrence. This version sports a whimsical personality, limited metal manipulation, and a bracelet that allows her to teleport.
- Maxima appears in the Smallville episode "Instinct", portrayed by Charlotte Sullivan. This version possesses a toxic kiss and empathic powers.
- Maxima appears in the Supergirl episode "Myriad", portrayed by Eve Torres Gracie. This version attempted to make Superman her mate, but was thwarted and incarcerated by the Department of Extranormal Operations (DEO).
- Maxima makes a non-speaking cameo appearance in the Kite Man: Hell Yeah! episode "Portal Potty, Hell Yeah!".

=== Film ===
- Maxima makes a non-speaking appearance in DC Super Hero Girls: Intergalactic Games as a student of the Korugar Academy.
- Maxima will appear in the DC Universe film Man of Tomorrow (2027) portrayed by Adria Arjona.

=== Video games ===
Maxima appears as a character summon in Scribblenauts Unmasked: A DC Comics Adventure.

=== Miscellaneous ===
Maxima makes non-speaking appearances in DC Super Hero Girls as a student of the Korugar Academy.

== See also ==
- List of Superman enemies
