= Prankster (comics) =

DC comics character

- The Prankster on the cover of Superman #660 (March 2007). Art by James Fry.

Publication information
- Publisher: DC Comics
- First appearance: Action Comics #51 (August 1942)
- Created by: Jerry Siegel (writer); John Sikela (artist)

In-story information
- Alter ego: Oswald Hubert Loomis
- Species: Human
- Team affiliations: Intergang; Injustice League; Underground Society
- Notable aliases: Doctor Loomis; The Pranksta; The Exorsist; Prisoner K1287931
- Abilities: Genius-level intellect; Equipment usage

The Prankster (Oswald Hubert Loomis) is a supervillain appearing in American comic books published by DC Comics, primarily as an enemy of Superman. The Prankster's particular gimmick is the use of various practical jokes and gags in committing his crimes.

== Publication history ==
The Prankster first appeared in Action Comics #51 (August 1942) and was created by Jerry Siegel and John Sikela.

== Fictional character biography ==
=== Golden Age version ===
The Prankster in his first appearance, Action Comics #51, art by John Sikela.

The original Prankster is Oswald Loomis, a criminal and conman who uses elaborate practical jokes and publicity campaigns to commit crimes. In his debut in Action Comics #51, the Prankster and his assistants break into a series of banks and force the employees to accept money. They even throw money at people in the streets. After he becomes famous for this joke, the Prankster enters yet another bank and takes all the money, also taking Lois Lane hostage. Superman, who had suspected the Prankster was up to no good, follows him to his lair. The Prankster seals his henchmen and Lois behind a sheet of glass and releases deadly gas, but Superman manages to rescue them and retrieve the money, while the Prankster is able to escape.

The Prankster returned several times to plague Superman throughout the Golden Age. As part of his advertisements for getting rewards for missing items, the Prankster later had his henchmen kidnap Lois and printed a story for Superman to pay a ransom of $50,000.00. Upon delivering the ransom to the location and finding out that the Prankster is in a lead bunker, Superman rescues Lois and informs the police about where to find the Prankster and his henchmen.

One of his more novel schemes involved the backing of several criminal leaders. The Prankster files copyright to own the English language. Once he gains legal ownership of the alphabet, the Prankster begins requiring payment of anyone using the written word. Superman is at first unable to do anything, as the Prankster is not breaking the law. Eventually, Superman discovers that the Prankster had hired an impostor to replace the registrar at the copyright office, and he turns the Prankster over to the authorities.

=== Silver Age version ===
The Prankster's history on Earth-One was still the same as his Earth-Two counterpart. The Prankster collaborates with the Toyman where they plotted to drive Superman crazy by committing crimes, breaking ridiculous obsolete laws like putting pennies in ears in Honolulu.

The Prankster later collaborated with Joker on different heists. Then the Prankster betrayed Joker when he captured Perry White and held him for ransom. Superman received help from Joker in taking down the Prankster. Then Superman took down Joker and rescued White.

In the Alan Moore-scripted story, Whatever Happened to the Man of Tomorrow?, the Prankster and the Toyman are unwittingly manipulated by Mister Mxyzptlk to discover Superman's secret identity. They succeed after kidnapping Pete Ross and torturing the information out of him, then killing him. After managing to unmask Clark Kent in front of Lana Lang and others by machine-gunning him and revealing his costume beneath his clothes, the Prankster and Toyman are captured by Superman.

=== Modern Age version ===
The first appearance of the modern age Prankster was in Superman (vol. 2) #16 (April 1988), in a story written and drawn by John Byrne. Comedian Oswald Loomis is the host of the children's variety series The Uncle Oswald Show. When the ratings begin to fall, the show is canceled by its network WGBS. Loomis finds himself typecast and unable to obtain new employment. Bitter that his gravy train has come to an end, Loomis seeks revenge on the network executives that were responsible for his show's cancellation (including Morgan Edge), but is foiled by Superman. This turned out to be an intentional objective for the Prankster since he knew he could not seriously oppose Superman, and so immediately surrendered upon facing the superhero with plans to exploit the media attention while in prison.

In The Adventures of Superman #579 (June 2000), Loomis reappears with a younger, more athletic body. He is presumed to have been empowered by Lord Satanus, but claims to have undergone expensive plastic surgery and dieting. His personality is changed as well; no longer an inept goofball, he is now a manic trickster seeking to unleash his twisted brand of laughter upon the world. By this time, Metropolis has been upgraded by Brainiac 13. The Prankster takes advantage of the new technology, creating high tech gadgets and weaponry, which retain a comical theme. He quickly challenges Superman again. Superman is infected with a kryptonite-infused nanotechnology virus and brought to S.T.A.R. Labs, where Steel, Superboy, and Supergirl shrink to microscopic size to destroy the virus.

In the One Year Later storyline, Lex Luthor hires the Prankster to wreak havoc in Metropolis. While Green Lantern and Hawkgirl bring down Loomis and his army of traffic-light-men, his rampage is just a distraction while Luthor breaks Kryptonite Man out of prison.

Apparently inspired by his turn working for Luthor, Prankster has taken on a new persona as a distraction-for-hire. Rather than pull off crimes himself, he is now hired by criminals to distract Superman and the police with his pranks while they commit crimes. He offers a discount to any client whose plans include Superman, as he sees Superman's involvement as "the best kind of free advertising". His new venture has apparently proven quite lucrative, as he is able to afford a high-tech lair. Above it sits a seemingly normal joke shop called 'Uncle Oley's Sure Fire Joke Shop'. Though the Prankster goads them to commit pranks on him, they do not always do so, for they fear his retaliation. He insists on never sharing his high-tech gadgets with clients, considering himself "an artist, not an armorer".

He was seen in the new Injustice League and is one of the villains featured in Salvation Run.

Prankster was among the many of Superman's villains who were rounded up and placed in the Phantom Zone by the people of Kandor. Superman freed Prankster to be taken to Belle Reve.

=== The New 52 ===
In 2011, The New 52 rebooted the DC universe. Oswald Loomis is the son of electrical engineer Harold Loomis who died in an accident caused by William Cole.

Prankster is one of the criminals who are plaguing Chicago. He has disabled New Western Station which William Cole's brother, Chicago mayor Wallace Cole, was about to reopen. Wallace later learned from the police that Prankster was behind the disabling of New Western Station. Prankster gathers an army of followers who are sympathetic to his cause and broadcasts across Chicago, stating that Wallace is not what he claims to be and has been harboring Tony Zucco. Zucco shoots Prankster in the shoulder, but he survives. Nightwing is relieved to see that the bullets went clean through and Prankster will survive. As police arrive, Nightwing swings away leaving Zucco and Prankster to face justice.

During the Forever Evil storyline, Prankster is among the villains recruited by the Crime Syndicate of America to join the Secret Society of Super Villains.

== Powers and abilities ==
Prankster has genius-level intellect.

=== Equipment ===
The Prankster has an arsenal of trick items that he uses in his crimes. Thanks to Brainiac 13's upgrade on Metropolis, Loomis possesses a new set of advanced tricks. These tricks include: ultrasonic devices that cause a person to laugh uncontrollably, high-voltage joy buzzers, exploding whoopee cushions, and nanobots.

== In other media ==
=== Television ===
- The Prankster appears in The New Adventures of Superman. This version is a member of A.P.E. (Allied Perpetrators of Evil).
- The Prankster appears in the Superman episode "Triple-Play", voiced by Howard Morris.
- An original incarnation of the Prankster appears in Lois & Clark: The New Adventures of Superman, portrayed by Bronson Pinchot. This version is Kyle Griffin, a former weapons designer who was incarcerated five years prior due to an article written by Lois Lane.
- Oswald Loomis appears in The Flash episode "Going Rogue", portrayed by Jesse Reid.

=== Video games ===
The Prankster appears as a character summon in Scribblenauts Unmasked: A DC Comics Adventure.

=== Miscellaneous ===
The Prankster appears in Smallville Season 11 #8. This version is a member of Intergang partnered with Mr. Freeze and a former Queen Industries R&D developer who turned to crime after being inspired by his former coworker Toyman.

== See also ==
- List of Superman enemies
