= 2013 in video games =

Numerous video games were released in 2013. Many awards went to games such as Madden NFL 25, NBA 2K14, WWE 2K14, NBA Live 14, BioShock Infinite, Grand Theft Auto V, The Last of Us, and The Legend of Zelda: A Link Between Worlds. New video game consoles released in 2013 include the PlayStation 4 from Sony Computer Entertainment and the Xbox One from Microsoft.

Series with new installments in 2013 include Ace Attorney, ARMA, Army of Two, Assassin's Creed, Batman: Arkham, Battlefield, BioShock, Call of Duty, Crysis, Dead Rising, Dead Space, Devil May Cry, Final Fantasy, Fire Emblem, Forza Motorsport, God of War, Gears of War, Gran Turismo, Grand Theft Auto, Killer Instinct, Killzone, The Legend of Zelda, Lost Planet, Luigi's Mansion, Mario Party, Metal Gear, Metro, Need for Speed, Pokémon, Rayman, Pikmin, Saints Row, SimCity, Sly Cooper, Sonic The Hedgehog, StarCraft, Super Mario, Tom Clancy's Splinter Cell, Tomb Raider, Total War, and Zoo Tycoon.

In addition, 2013 saw the introduction of several new properties, including Beyond: Two Souls, The Last of Us, Papers, Please, Tearaway, Cookie Clicker and The Wonderful 101.

== Highest-grossing games ==
The following were 2013's top ten highest-grossing video games in terms of worldwide revenue (including physical sales, digital purchases, subscriptions, microtransactions, free-to-play and pay-to-play) across all platforms (including mobile, PC and console platforms).

No.	Game	Revenue	Publisher(s)	Genre	Platform(s)	Business model	Ref.
1	Puzzle & Dragons	$1,522,000,000	GungHo Online Entertainment (SoftBank Group)	Puzzle	Mobile	Free-to-play	
2	Candy Crush Saga	$1,460,000,000	King Digital Entertainment	Puzzle	Mobile	Free-to-play	
3	World of Warcraft	$1,041,000,000	Blizzard Entertainment (Activision Blizzard)	MMORPG	PC, Console	Subscription / pay-to-play	
4	Grand Theft Auto V	$1,000,000,000	Rockstar Games (Take-Two Interactive)	Action-adventure	Console	Buy-to-play	
5	Call of Duty: Ghosts	$1,000,000,000	Activision (Activision Blizzard)	FPS	PC, Console	Buy-to-play	
6	Crossfire	$1,000,000,000	Smilegate / Tencent	FPS	PC	Free-to-play	
7	League of Legends	$624,000,000	Riot Games / Tencent	MOBA	PC	Free-to-play	
8	Pokémon X / Y	$464,000,000	Nintendo / The Pokémon Company	RPG	Console	Buy-to-play	
9	Dungeon Fighter Online	$426,000,000	Neople / Nexon	Beat 'em up	PC	Free-to-play	
10	World of Tanks	$372,000,000	Wargaming.net	Vehicular combat, MMO	PC	Free-to-play	

== Top-rated games ==
=== Critically acclaimed titles ===
Metacritic (MC) and GameRankings (GR) are aggregators of video game journalism reviews.

2013 games and expansions scoring at least 90/100 (MC) or 90% (GR)
Game	Publisher	Release Date	Platform	MC score	GR score
Grand Theft Auto V	Rockstar Games	September 17, 2013	PS3	97/100	97.01%
Grand Theft Auto V	Rockstar Games	September 17, 2013	X360	97/100	96.1%
BioShock Infinite	2K Games	March 26, 2013	PS3	94/100	95.94%
The Last of Us	Sony Computer Entertainment	June 14, 2013	PS3	95/100	95.09%
BioShock Infinite	2K Games	March 26, 2013	WIN	94/100	92.62%
Flower	Sony Computer Entertainment	November 15, 2013	PS4	91/100	93.57%
Fez	Trapdoor	May 1, 2013	WIN	91/100	93.5%
Metal Gear Solid: The Legacy Collection	Konami	July 9, 2013	PS3	93/100	93.33%
Super Mario 3D World	Nintendo	November 21, 2013	WiiU	93/100	92.56%
Brothers: A Tale of Two Sons	505 Games	September 3, 2013	WIN	90/100	93.12%
Rayman Legends	Ubisoft	August 29, 2013	WiiU	92/100	93%
BioShock Infinite	2K Games	March 26, 2013	X360	93/100	91.89%
Deus Ex: Human Revolution – Director's Cut	Square Enix	October 22, 2013	WIN	91/100	92.5%
Rayman Legends	Ubisoft	August 29, 2013	PS3	91/100	91.81%
The Legend of Zelda: The Wind Waker HD	Nintendo	September 20, 2013	WiiU	90/100	91.08%
The Legend of Zelda: A Link Between Worlds	Nintendo	November 22, 2013	3DS	91/100	90.55%
Spelunky	Mossmouth	August 8, 2013	WIN	90/100	91%
Mass Effect 3: Citadel	Electronic Arts	March 5, 2013	PS3	90/100	90.67%
The Stanley Parable	Galactic Cafe	October 13, 2013	WIN	88/100	90.25%
Dota 2	Valve	July 9, 2013	WIN	90/100	89.27%
Rayman Legends	Ubisoft	August 29, 2013	WIN	90/100	89%
Rayman Legends	Ubisoft	August 29, 2013	X360	90/100	88.88%
Crusader Kings II: The Old Gods	Paradox Interactive	May 28, 2013	WIN	88/100	90%
XCOM: Enemy Within	2K Games	November 12, 2013	PS3	88/100	90%
Rage of the Gladiator	Gamelion Studios	September 19, 2013	3DS	88/100	90%

=== Major awards ===
Category/Organization		31st Golden Joystick Awards October 25, 2013	VGX December 7, 2013		17th Annual D.I.C.E. Awards February 6, 2014		10th British Academy Games Awards March 12, 2014	14th Game Developers Choice Awards March 19, 2014
Game of the Year		Grand Theft Auto V			The Last of Us			
Independent / Debut (Note: Certain award presentations combine these categories.)		Mark of the Ninja	Gone Home		—N/a		Gone Home	
Downloadable		—N/a			Brothers: A Tale of Two Sons		—N/a	Papers, Please
Mobile/Handheld	Mobile	XCOM: Enemy Unknown	Plants vs. Zombies 2: It's About Time				Tearaway	The Legend of Zelda: A Link Between Worlds
Mobile/Handheld	Handheld	Assassin's Creed III: Liberation	The Legend of Zelda: A Link Between Worlds				Tearaway	The Legend of Zelda: A Link Between Worlds
Innovation		Oculus Rift	—N/a		The Last of Us		Brothers: A Tale of Two Sons	Papers, Please
Artistic Achievement	Animation	BioShock Infinite	—N/a		The Last of Us		Tearaway	BioShock Infinite
Artistic Achievement	Art Direction	BioShock Infinite	—N/a		The Last of Us		Tearaway	BioShock Infinite
Audio	Music	—N/a	Grand Theft Auto V		BioShock Infinite			BioShock Infinite
Audio	Sound Design	—N/a	—N/a		The Last of Us			BioShock Infinite
Character or Performance	Actor	—N/a	Troy Baker as Joel; The Last of Us	The Lutece Twins; BioShock Infinite	Ellie; The Last of Us		Ashley Johnson as Ellie; The Last of Us	—N/a
Character or Performance	Actress	—N/a	Ashley Johnson as Ellie; The Last of Us	The Lutece Twins; BioShock Infinite	Ellie; The Last of Us		Ashley Johnson as Ellie; The Last of Us	—N/a
Game Direction or Design		—N/a			The Last of Us		Grand Theft Auto V	The Last of Us
Narrative		The Last of Us	—N/a		The Last of Us			
Technical Achievement	Gameplay Engineering	—N/a			Grand Theft Auto V		—N/a	Grand Theft Auto V
Technical Achievement	Visual Engineering	—N/a			The Last of Us		—N/a	Grand Theft Auto V
Multiplayer/Online	Multiplayer	Payday 2	—N/a		World of Tanks		Grand Theft Auto V	—N/a
Multiplayer/Online	Online	World of Tanks	—N/a		World of Tanks		Grand Theft Auto V	—N/a
Action/Adventure	Action/Shooter	—N/a	BioShock Infinite				The Last of Us	—N/a
Action/Adventure	Adventure	—N/a	Assassin's Creed IV: Black Flag		The Last of Us		The Last of Us	—N/a
Casual or Family	Casual	—N/a	Animal Crossing: New Leaf		Plant vs. Zombies 2: It's About Time		Tearaway	—N/a
Casual or Family	Family	—N/a	Animal Crossing: New Leaf		Super Mario 3D World		Tearaway	—N/a
Fighting		—N/a	Injustice: Gods Among Us				—N/a	—N/a
Role-Playing		—N/a	Ni no Kuni: Wrath of the White Witch		Diablo III		—N/a	—N/a
Sports/Racing	Sports	—N/a	NBA 2K14		FIFA 14		FIFA 14	—N/a
Sports/Racing	Racing	—N/a	Forza Motorsport 5				FIFA 14	—N/a
Strategy/Simulation		—N/a			XCOM: Enemy Within		Papers, Please	—N/a
Special Award		Lifetime Achievement	—N/a		Hall of Fame	Pioneer Award	BAFTA Fellowship	Lifetime Achievement Award
Special Award		Ken Levine	—N/a		Sam Houser, Dan Houser, Leslie Benzies	Eugene Jarvis	Rockstar Games	Ken Kutaragi

== Major events ==
Date	Event	Ref.
February 14	Nintendo starts the "Year of Luigi" to celebrate the 30th anniversary of the titular character.	
February 20 – 22	Sony's eighth generation console PlayStation 4 (PS4) reveal held at New York City, New York.	
March	The beta for Kahoot! is released with the full version released in September.	
March 22 – 24	PAX East 2013 held at the Boston Convention and Exhibition Center.	
March 23 – 25	Midwest Gaming Classic 2013 held at the Sheraton Milwaukee Brookfield Hotel in Brookfield, Wisconsin.	
March 25 – 29	Game Developers Conference 2013 held in San Francisco, California.	
May	Cloud9 is founded in Santa Monica, California.	
May 21 – 23	Microsoft's eighth generation console Xbox One reveal held at Microsoft Redmond Campus, Washington.	
June 5	Jellyvision Games rebrands as Jackbox Games.	
June 11 – 13	E3 2013 was held at the Los Angeles Convention Center.	
June 22 – 23	Rezzed 2013 was held at the NEC Birmingham.	
July 18 – 21	SDCC 2013 was held at the San Diego Convention Center.	
July 19 – 22	PAX Australia 2013 was held at the Melbourne Showgrounds.	
August 1 – 4	QuakeCon 2013: The massive annual LAN party held in Dallas, Texas.	
August 7 – 11	The International 2013, the third iteration of the annual Dota 2 global esports tournament, was held in Seattle.	
August 9 – 11	The Pokémon World Championships was held in Canada instead of the United States.	
August 22 – 25	Gamescom 2013 held in Cologne, Germany.	
August 30 – September 2	PAX Prime 2013 held at the Washington State Convention Center in Seattle.	
September 9	The Spyro series celebrated its 15th anniversary.	
September 19 – 22	Tokyo Game Show 2013 at the Makuhari Messe in Tokyo.	
September 26 – 29	Eurogamer Expo 2013 held in Earls Court, London.	
October 3 – 6	Indiecade 2013 festival held in Culver City, California.	
October 4 – 7	EB Games Expo 2013 held at the Sydney Showground in Sydney Olympic Park, New South Wales.	
October 25 – 27	Games Week 2013 held in Milan, Italy.	
October 30 – November 3	Paris Games Week 2013 held in Paris, France.	
November 8 – 9	BlizzCon 2013 held at the Anaheim Convention Center in Anaheim, California.	
December 7	The final Spike Video Game Awards are held.	

== Notable deaths ==
- January 20 – Alexander Brüggemann, 46, Lead and Game Designer to The Settlers series and Co-founder of Piranha Bytes.
- January 20 – Kenji Eno, 42, Japanese musician and game designer for Juuouki, Casino Kid 2, Sunman
- January 25 – Normand Corbeil, BAFTA Games Award winner and composer for Heavy Rain, Indigo Prophecy and Beyond: Two Souls.
- February 11 – Robin Sachs, 61, Voice actor on Mass Effect, Star Wars: Knights of the Old Republic, Dragon Age: Origins – Awakening
- February 11 – Erik Cassel, 45, co-founder of Roblox Corporation.
- May 28 – Hiroo Isono, 68, Painter and illustrator for title such as main visual for Final Fantasy Adventure,Secret of Mana and Heroes of Mana.
- May 30 – Andrew Scott Reisse, 33, Co-founder of Oculus VR
- July 3 – Ryan Davis, 34, GameSpot journalist and co-founder of Giant Bomb.
- September 19 – Hiroshi Yamauchi, 85, Japanese businessman and third president of Nintendo (1949–2002)
- October 1 – Tom Clancy, 66, novelist and namesake of the Tom Clancy's series.
- October 13 – David Bunnett, 65, co-founder of Stormfront Studios and work on title; Neverwinter Nights and the Xbox exclusive Bloodwake.
- November 15 – Charles Bellfield, 43, former Sega of America VP of marketing and communication from 1998 to 2003. Also led the launch of the Dreamcast.
- November 28 – Danny Wells, 72, actor who played Luigi in The Super Mario Bros. Super Show! and provided voice work in Descent 3, Wizardry 8, Evolution Worlds, and Splinter Cell: Chaos Theory.

== Hardware releases ==
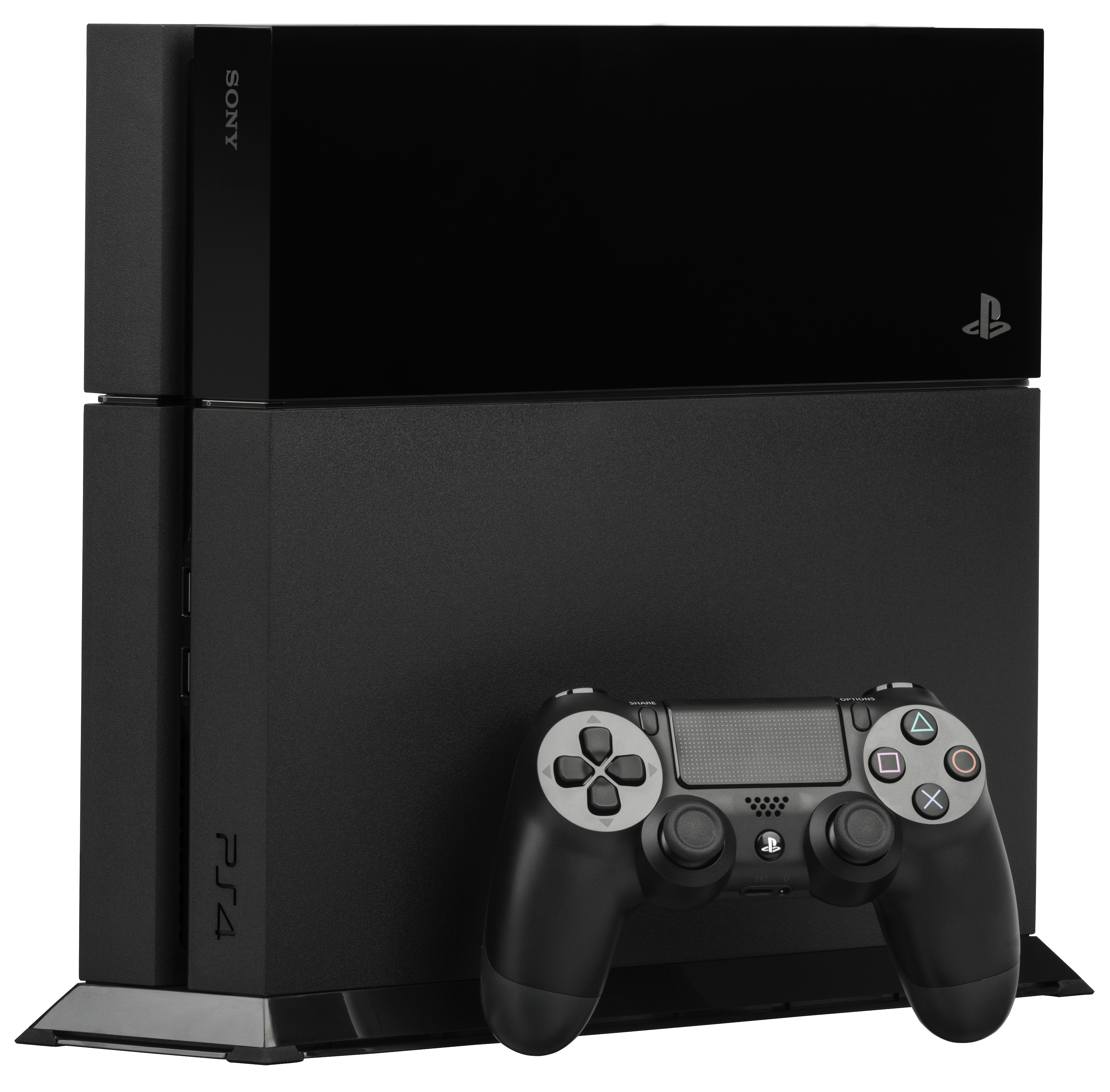
PlayStation 4

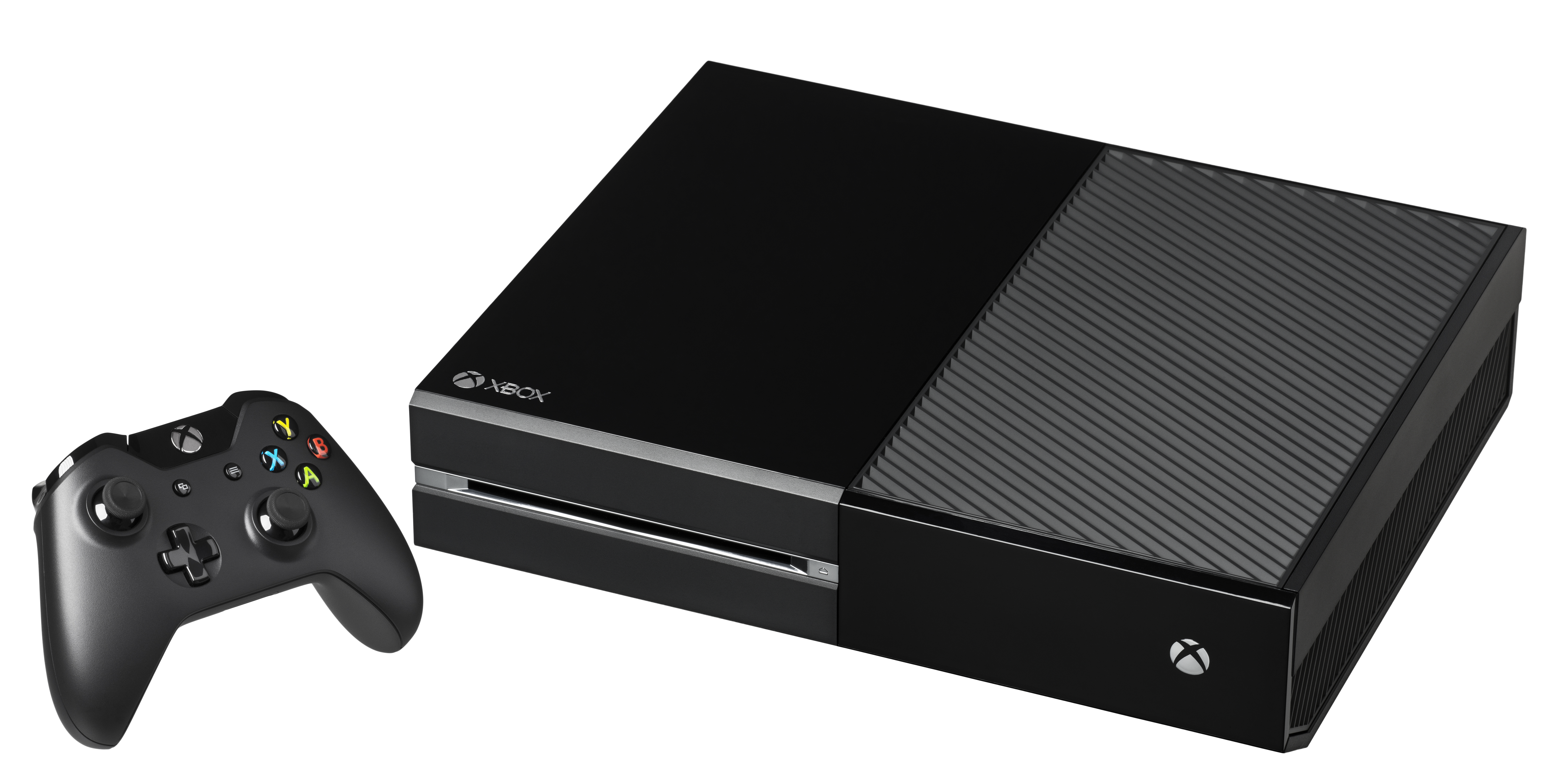
Xbox One

The list of game consoles released in 2013.

Date	Console	Manufacturer	Ref.
June 10	Xbox 360 E^{NA}	Microsoft	
June 20	Xbox 360 E^{EU}	Microsoft	
June 25	Ouya	Ouya Inc.	
July 31	Nvidia Shield	Nvidia	
October 12	Nintendo 2DS^{NA/PAL}	Nintendo	
November 14	PlayStation TV	Sony	
November 15	GameStick	PlayJam	
November 15	PlayStation 4^{NA}	Sony	
November 22	Xbox One	Microsoft	
November 26	Nintendo 2DS^{BR}	Nintendo	
November 29	PlayStation 4^{PAL}	Sony	
December 7	Nintendo 2DS^{KOR}	Nintendo	
December 10	MOJO	Mad Catz	

== Video game-based film and television releases ==
Title	Date	Type	Distributor(s)	Franchise	Original game publisher(s)	Ref.
Angry Birds Toons	March 17, 2013	Animated mini series	Toons.TV	Angry Birds	Rovio Entertainment	
Pac-Man and the Ghostly Adventures	June 15, 2013	3D anime series	Tokyo MX	Pac-Man	Namco	
Danganronpa: The Animation	July 4, 2013	Anime mini series	Mainichi Broadcasting System	Danganronpa	Spike Chunsoft	
Genesect and the Legend Awakened	July 13, 2013	Anime film	Toho (Japan)	Pokémon	Nintendo; The Pokémon Company	
Rabbids Invasion	August 3, 2013	3D animated series	Nickelodeon	Rabbids	Ubisoft	
Pokémon Origins	October 2, 2013	Anime mini series	TV Tokyo	Pokémon	Nintendo; The Pokémon Company	
The Smash Brothers	October 11, 2013	Documentary series	East Point Pictures	Super Smash Bros.	Nintendo	
Bayonetta: Bloody Fate	November 23, 2013	Anime film	Gonzo	Bayonetta	Platinum Games	
Persona 3 The Movie: No. 1, Spring of Birth	November 23, 2013	Anime film	Aniplex	Persona	Atlus	
How Videogames Changed the World	November 30, 2013	Documentary series	Channel 4	—N/a	—N/a	
Moshi Monsters: The Movie	December 20, 2013	Animated film	Universal Pictures	Moshi Monsters	Mind Candy	

== See also ==
- 2013 in esports
- 2013 in games
