= List of video games featuring Superman =

Superman video game for the Atari 2600, the first licensed Superman game released.

A number of officially licensed video games based on the character Superman have been created, the first being released in 1979, over a year after the Superman film.

Over the years, video games based on Superman have attained a reputation for being of low quality. The most prevalent example of this is the 1999 Nintendo 64 Superman game which is considered to be one of the worst video games ever made.

== Standalone games ==
Game	Details
Superman 1979 – Atari 2600	Notes: The player takes control of Superman, who must repair the bridge destroyed by Lex Luthor, capture Luthor and his henchmen, enter a phone booth to turn back into Clark Kent, then return to the Daily Planet in the shortest amount of time.; To slow Superman's progress, Kryptonite has been released by Luthor. If hit by Kryptonite, Superman loses his abilities to capture criminals and fly. To regain them, he must find and kiss Lois Lane.; One of the earliest console games to feature a pause option.
Superman: The Game 1985 – Commodore 64, Atari 8-bit	Notes: Originally for the C64 but was also ported to the Atari and many other systems in Europe.; Superman's enemy Darkseid is also playable.
Superman 1987 – NES	Notes: The Japanese version of the game for the Famicom features the John Williams Superman theme.
Superman 1988 – Arcade	Notes: Taito action game that allows a second player to play a red-garbed Superman.; Features John Williams Superman theme from the film series.
Superman: The Man of Steel 1989 – Commodore 64, ZX Spectrum, MSX, Amiga, Atari ST	Notes: Hybrid action game featuring 3D flying, overhead vertical scrolling and side scrolling sections.; Features both Lex Luthor and Darkseid as villains.
Superman 1992 – Genesis	Notes: Side-scrolling action game where the player controls Superman through various levels in an effort to defeat various villains, culminating with the evil supervillain Brainiac. In Europe it was released as Superman: The Man of Steel.
Superman: The Man of Steel 1993 – Master System, Game Gear	Notes: 2D scrolling action game developed by Graftgold and published in Europe only by Virgin Interactive. It is based on the earlier Superman game for the Genesis by Sunsoft.
The Death and Return of Superman 1994 – Super NES and Genesis	Notes: Beat 'em up video game based on "The Death of Superman" storyline.
Superman 1997 – Game Boy	Notes: Scrolling action game developed by Titus Software.
Superman Activity Center 1997 – MacOS, Windows	Notes: Educational game based on Superman: The Animated Series, from Knowledge Adventure.
Superman: The New Adventures 1999 – Nintendo 64	Notes: Unofficially known as Superman 64, it is a 3D action game in which the player takes control of Superman who must rescue his friends from a virtual-reality replica of Metropolis.; The game is notorious among critics and gamers as one of the worst games ever made. Common criticisms include poor collision detection, awkward controls, and bizarre glitches.
Superman: Shadow of Apokolips 2002 – PlayStation 2, GameCube	Notes: Based on Superman: The Animated Series, developed by Infogrames Sheffield House and published by Infogrames. The cut scenes used cel-shaded animation to emulate the look of traditional animation. The original Superman: The Animated Series voice cast all returned to their roles for the game.
Superman: The Man of Steel 2002 – Xbox	Notes: Action game from Circus Freak Studios and published by Infogrames based on the comic books.
Superman: Countdown to Apokolips 2003 – Game Boy Advance	Notes: From Infogrames, based largely on Superman: The Animated Series, including its character portrayals, and artistic style.; There are bosses such as Livewire, Darkseid, and Bruno Mannheim, as well as goons and other items.
Superman The Greatest Superhero July 6, 2005 – V-Smile	Notes: Educational game of Superman, from VTech.
Superman Returns 2006 – Nintendo DS, PlayStation 2, Xbox 360, Xbox	Notes: Loosely based on the Superman movie of the same name; features the voice and likeness of many cast members. In the game, Superman combats Metallo, who does not appear in the movie, as well as other classic villains.; For the Game Boy Advance, a different style of game was released to exploit the license. Superman Returns: Fortress of Solitude combines various puzzle challenges (one of which was Sudoku with superpowers) punctuated with short flying action sequences.
Superman 2006 – Handheld TV game	Notes: A TV game with different styles of game published by Jakks Pacific and developed by HotGen, with 5 episodes.

== Related games ==
Game	Details
Justice League Task Force 1995 – Super NES, Genesis	Notes: Superman is one of the playable characters in this 1995 Sunsoft fighting game.
Justice League: Injustice for All 2002 – Game Boy Advance	Notes: Superman is a playable character.
Justice League: Chronicles 2003 – Game Boy Advance	Notes: Superman is a playable character.
Justice League Heroes 2006 – Xbox, PlayStation 2, Nintendo DS, and PlayStation Portable	Notes: Based on DC Comics' premiere superhero team, the Justice League of America.; The handheld Nintendo DS version shares a similar visual style and gameplay mechanics to the console game, but serves as a prequel to its story.; Superman is voiced by Crispin Freeman.
Mortal Kombat vs. DC Universe 2008 – PlayStation 3, Xbox 360	Notes: Combined characters from the Mortal Kombat franchise with those from the DC Universe, including Superman (voiced by Christopher Corey Smith).; In his ending, Superman works with Shazam to prepare a new costume that makes him impervious to magic attacks.
Justice League Heroes United 2009 – Arcade	Notes: Scrolling fighter distributed by Global VR in which Superman, Batman, Hawkgirl, Wonder Woman and the Green Lantern are playable characters.
DC Universe Online 2011 – PlayStation 3, Microsoft Windows	Notes: Massively multiplayer online role-playing game featuring Superman (voiced by Adam Baldwin) as a non-playable character, but playable on Legends Mode (PVP Battle).
Lego Batman 2: DC Super Heroes 2012 – Microsoft Windows, PlayStation 3, PlayStation Vita, Nintendo 3DS, Wii, Nintendo DS, Xbox 360, Wii U	Notes: Main role, playable character (voiced by Travis Willingham).
Injustice: Gods Among Us 2013 – Xbox 360, PlayStation 3, PlayStation 4, Xbox One, Microsoft Windows, Wii U	Notes: Fighting game from the creators of Mortal Kombat vs. DC Universe featuring Superman (voiced by George Newbern) as a playable character, with an alternative version of the character as the primary antagonist and the original one as a minor protagonist. The alternate Superman became a dictator after the Joker tricked him into killing Lois and his unborn child and nuking Metropolis. In his Classic Arcade Battle Ending, Superman, though pleased with the outcome, feels troubled with the battle with his counterpart, noticing that he would not be the only Superman to go so far astray. After much discussion with his fellow Leaguers, just in case he would go rogue, Superman ingests a remote-release Kryptonite capsule, when triggered, the Kryptonite would permeate his body, killing him. In each week, a different Leaguer is voted to take possession of its remote control, with only Batman, however, being denied a shift.
Scribblenauts Unmasked: A DC Comics Adventure 2013 – Xbox One, Wii U, PlayStation 4, Microsoft Windows, Nintendo 3DS	Notes: A puzzle adventure game featuring Superman as a non-playable character.
Young Justice: Legacy 2013 – Nintendo 3DS, PlayStation 3, Xbox 360, Microsoft Windows	Notes: An action-adventure game based on the Young Justice television series featuring Superman as a non-playable character.
Lego Batman 3: Beyond Gotham 2014 – Xbox 360, Xbox One, Wii U, PlayStation 3, PlayStation 4, PlayStation Vita, Microsoft Windows, Nintendo 3DS	Notes: Sequel to Lego Batman 2: DC Super Heroes with Travis Willingham reprising his role.; He is designed after his appearance in The New 52.; Along with the default costume, Superman also has two additional variants: his Solar Suit (which is found in the final level), and the Man of Steel incarnation (which was available via DLC).
Infinite Crisis 2015 – Microsoft Windows	Notes: A free-to-play multiplayer online battle arena based on the comic book Infinite Crisis features Superman as a playable character.; Superman is voiced by Troy Baker, who previously voiced Batman in Lego Batman 2: DC Super Heroes and the Joker in Batman: Arkham Origins.
Injustice 2 May 16, 2017 – Android, iOS, PlayStation 4, Xbox One, Microsoft Windows	Notes: Sequel to Injustice: Gods Among Us with Superman (voiced by George Newbern) as a playable character.; Fighting game developed by NetherRealm Studios and published by Warner Bros. Interactive Entertainment; In his single player ending, Superman connects himself to Brainiac's ship. When he frees the worlds from Brainiac's ship, he plans to build a Legion of Super-Heroes to bring peace to the universe.
Lego DC Super-Villains October 16, 2018 – PlayStation 4, Xbox One, Nintendo Switch, Microsoft Windows	Notes: Sequel to Lego Batman 3: Beyond Gotham, with Travis Willingham reprising his role yet again.
Justice League: Cosmic Chaos March 10, 2023 – Nintendo Switch, PlayStation 4, PlayStation 5, Windows, Xbox One, Xbox Series X/S	Notes: Developed by PHL Collective and published by Outright Games.; Superman is a playable character.; Voiced by Nolan North.
Suicide Squad: Kill the Justice League February 2, 2024 – PlayStation 5, Xbox Series X, Microsoft Windows	Notes: A continuation of the Batman: Arkham series, this game revolves around the Suicide Squad's attempts to defeat Brainiac when he invades Earth and brainwashes the Justice League.
MultiVersus May 28, 2024 – Microsoft Windows, PlayStation 4, Xbox One, PlayStation 5, Xbox Series X/S	Notes: A crossover fighting game featuring Superman (voiced by George Newbern) as a playable character.

== Mobile games ==
Game	Details
Superman 2011 – iOS	Notes: Action game developepd by Chillingo.

== Canceled games ==
Game	Details
Superman III Cancellation date: 1983	Proposed system release: Atari 5200
Superman III Cancellation date: 1983	Notes: A game based on the Superman III movie was developed for the Atari 5200 but was never released.
Superman Cancellation date: 1992	Proposed system release: NES
Superman Cancellation date: 1992	Notes: Superman was in development by EIM and was going to be published by Sunsoft. After Sunsoft lost the Superman license, the game had some changes made and became Sunman, but was cancelled.
Superman Cancellation date: 2000	Proposed system release: PlayStation
Superman Cancellation date: 2000	Notes: This was initially intended to be a port of the N64 game, but following its critical failure, an entirely new game began development.; The game was hit by setbacks and after two years in development, when it was ready for release, Titus Software's rights to Superman had expired.
Superman: Battle for Metropolis Cancellation date: 2001	Proposed system release: Game Boy Color
Superman: Battle for Metropolis Cancellation date: 2001	Notes: In development by Neon Studios and to be published by Infogrames, but was cancelled after failing to impress DC Comics.; A prototype from late in its development was leaked onto the Internet in late 2019.
Blue Steel Cancellation date: 2008	Proposed system release: PlayStation 3, Xbox 360, Wii
Blue Steel Cancellation date: 2008	Notes: A Superman game was being created by Factor 5 for PS3, Xbox 360, and the Wii, but was cancelled when Brash Entertainment went out of business.
