= Real Sound: Kaze no Regret =

1997 adventure game designed for visually impaired players

- Developer: Warp
- Publisher: Warp
- Designer: Kenji Eno
- Writer: Yuji Sakamoto
- Composer: Keiichi Suzuki
- Platforms: Sega Saturn, Dreamcast
- Release: Saturn: JP: July 18, 1997; Dreamcast: JP: March 11, 1999
- Genres: Audio game, adventure
- Mode: Single-player

Real Sound: Kaze no Regret (Note: Riaru Saundo ~ Kaze no Riguretto (Japanese: リアルサウンド ～風のリグレット～)) is an adventure audio game developed and published by Warp. The game was first released for the Sega Saturn in July 1997, and was later ported to the Dreamcast in March 1999. The game was designed to provide equal access to sighted and blind players alike. Its subtitle, Kaze no Regret, roughly translates to "The Wind's Regret" or "The Wind(s) of Regret".

== Gameplay ==
Real Sound is an audio game that plays similarly to a visual novel. The screen is blank throughout the duration of the game, and the player spends the majority of the time listening as the plot unfolds. However, at critical points in the story a set of chimes will ring, signifying that the player needs to make a decision at that moment. These choices impact how the story progresses. The Dreamcast version features an optional "visual mode", which displays non-essential still pictures on the screen.

== Plot ==
The story follows Hiroshi Nonomura (voiced by Takashi Kashiwabara), an elementary school student who is seated next to Izumi Sakurai (voiced by Ryoko Shinohara), a transfer student. The girl's grandfather unexpectedly died, and will need to move to Tokyo on the day summer vacation starts. The two decide to elope, and arrange to meet at a clock tower to begin their flight. However, Izumi never shows up and shortly afterward she is transferred away again.

Ten years later, Hiroshi and Izumi, now young adults, are dating. Izumi arranged a job interview with her HR manager for Hiroshi, but as they were riding the train, she suddenly gets off and disappears, with Hiroshi unable to contact her for several days.

== Development ==
The concept for Real Sound: Kaze no Regret was conceived by Kenji Eno. After receiving numerous letters from blind fans of his games in Japan, Eno sought to create a game that both sighted and blind players could experience equally.

In a 2008 interview with 1Up.com, Eno stated:

I had a chance to visit people who are visually impaired, and I learned that there are blind people who play action games. Of course, [blind people are] not able to have the full experience, and they're kind of trying to force themselves to be able to play, but they're making the effort. So I thought that if you turn off the monitor, both of you are just hearing the game. So after you finish the game, you can have an equal conversation about it with a blind person. That's an inspiration behind [Real Sound: Kaze no Regret] as well.

Sega was interested in obtaining the exclusive rights to the game, and Eno stipulated that he would only sell the rights on the condition that Sega were to donate a thousand Saturn consoles to the visually impaired, with Warp in turn donating copies of Real Sound alongside the consoles. In explaining why the game has only been re-released once despite apparent interest in the title, Eno has stated that "it's been several years now, and of course the contract probably isn't valid anymore, but the reason that I haven't done anything with this game is that I made this promise with Sega back in the day, and it's exclusive because of those conditions."

The game was written by Yuji Sakamoto, and features a number of secondary characters voiced by actors such as Miho Kanno and Ai Maeda. The game's music was primarily composed by Keiichi Suzuki (best known in the West for his work on the Mother/EarthBound series), with Akiko Yano composing the ending theme.

== Reception and legacy ==
Reception

Review score
Publication	Score
Famitsu	8/10, 6/10, 5/10, 8/10 (SAT)

Four writers for Famitsu reviewed Real Sound: Kaze no Regret. One reviewer highlighted that it would give people divided opinions. One complimented it as an ambitious work from Warp while others were interested but felt the pacing of the game and its four hour length were problematic.

The Saturn version would go on to sell around 110,000 copies by early 1998, becoming a cult hit like many of Warp's other titles. The game is also known for its inclusion of feelies, a signature move that Eno had become known for. Every copy contained a set of instructions in braille, and a packet of seeds. Eno later explained why the seeds were included in the package:

The main reason for including seeds was that Real Sound is a love story, and it's a game that has a totally different concept from my former games, like horror games or the smaller titles, so I wanted people to understand the atmosphere of the game. So I thought that if I included these flower seeds, then that would pass on the image and give the user an idea of what kind of game it is without even explaining the story and all that. That's one of the reasons that I decided to do this. And, also, another reason is that I felt like I wanted the users to grow and support the game. I was also thinking about releasing sequels, so I wanted the users to grow the game, grow the franchise.

A version of the game representing only one path through the game aired on Tokyo FM in 1997.

A number of Warp's other games, such as Enemy Zero and D2, feature sound-based gameplay elements: most enemies in Enemy Zero are invisible, with the player needing to rely on sound cues to defeat them. D2 also drew heavily from the concept of limitations to sensory perceptions, featuring portions of the game where the main character is rendered blind (with only a voice to guide her) and alternately deaf (with only vision to guide her).

Real Sound was originally intended to be a series, with a second installment titled Real Sound 2: Kiri no Orgel (Note: リアルサウンド2 ～霧のオルゴール～, lit. Real Sound 2: Music Box of the Mist) being originally slated for a June 1998 release, before getting delayed and eventually cancelled due to issues with sound compression. Kiri no Orgel was intended to be horror-themed, and a planned third game, Spy Lunch (スパイランチ), was intended to be a comedy.

Real Sound: Kaze no Regret has since become one of the most popular games for the blind in Japan, due in part to it being one of the few commercially released games specifically designed with the visually impaired in mind. In 2024, From Yellow to Orange (the current incarnation of Warp) released an audiobook version of the game to commemorate its 27th anniversary.
