= Trip'd =

1994 video game

- North American 3DO cover art
- Developer: Warp
- Publishers: 3DO: JP: San-ei Shobo Publishing; NA: Panasonic; PlayStation: JP: Asmik
- Director: Kenji Eno
- Programmers: Hideki Miura; Hirofumi Hayashida
- Artist: Tomohiro Miyazaki
- Platforms: 3DO; PlayStation
- Release: 3DO: JP: August 6, 1994; NA: August 1995; PlayStation: JP: March 31, 1995
- Genre: Puzzle
- Modes: Single-player, multiplayer

Trip'd is a puzzle video game developed by Japanese studio Warp for 3DO. Using the falling block puzzle format, Trip'd presents the player with triads of colored, tile-shaped eggs that gradually descend the screen to stack up on the bottom. The objective is to connect four or more matching eggs to eliminate them from the play field. Creatures called Deow'Nz can be formed and destroyed to create various effects depending on the number of players.

The game was created by a small team led by Warp president Kenji Eno. It was initially released in Japan in August 1994 by San-ei Shobo Publishing as Uchū Seibutsu Flopon-kun (Note: Japanese: 宇宙生物フロポン君, Hepburn: Uchū Seibutsu Furopon-kun; lit. "Space Creature Flopon"). Asmik released an enhanced version of the game for PlayStation in Japan in March 1995 while Panasonic localized another version as Trip'd on 3DO in North America that August. Trip'd received a mediocre response from critics. Its core gameplay was largely seen as derivative of other puzzle titles while its distinct mechanics, graphics, and audio polarized reviewers.

== Gameplay ==
The play field shows a falling triad, a Hawk'n, and a number of eggs stacked on the bottom of the screen. This single-player mode features a score and level on the left.

Trip'd is a falling block puzzle game where triads of colored, tile-shaped eggs gradually descend the screen to stack up on the bottom. Should the stack of eggs reach the line at the top of the play field, the game ends. To avoid this, triads can be moved, rotated, and reoriented by the player as they fall. When four or more eggs of the same color are connected in a line, they are eliminated from the screen, causing any eggs stacked on top to shift down. However, aligning four similar eggs in a two-by-two square will spawn a creature called a Deow'Nz within that space instead. The player can also align a quartet of Deow'Nz of any color in a four-by-four square pattern to make one giant creature appear.

Connecting egg tiles in the aforementioned manner will destroy any Deow'Nz of that same color and trigger a special effect. These effects may differ slightly depending on the game mode. For instance, in single-player mode, destroying a gray Hawk'n will wipe out 12 additional eggs. Doing so in a split screen versus mode will spawn another creature, the green Citr'n, on the opponent's play field. Destroying a Citr'n will cause a layer of mismatched eggs to fall on that player's own field in all modes. The single-player option in Trip'd acts as a practice or survival mode and features a score that increases when eggs and Deow'Nz are eliminated. The speed at which the triads fall will steadily rise until the level increases, resulting in a layer of eggs disappearing and the speed resetting. The game features two versus modes which allow the player to either battle a second human opponent or choose a match against one of eight computer-controlled opponents of varying difficulty. A fourth mode called "Trip'Dance" allows the player to create music with each of the gamepad's buttons corresponding to a different instrument and psychedelic visual displayed on-screen.

== Development and release ==
The game's original incarnation Uchū Seibutsu Flopon-kun was developed by Japanese studio Warp and directed by its president Kenji Eno. It was Warp's second release after the action game Totsugeki Karakuri Megadasu!!. Both works were created out of Eno's philosophy to balance the company with the production of simpler, casual games and the larger, more serious projects like the horror title D. Alongside Eno, the development staff consisted of graphic designer Tomohiro Miyazaki and programmers Hideki Miura and Hirofumi Hayashida.

The game was launched in Japan on the 3DO on August 6, 1994 by San-ei Shobo Publishing. An enhanced edition called Uchū Seibutsu Flopon-kun P! was released by Asmik on PlayStation in Japan on March 31, 1995. The localized version, Trip'd, was published on the North America 3DO by Panasonic in August of that year as Warp's first release outside Japan. The name Trip'd is a nod to The 3DO Company founder Trip Hawkins. Eno took credit for the bizarre design of the game's packaging, explaining that he "basically put bulls*** all over [the] manual." This poked fun at stereotypical Western views of Japan like depicting the location of Warp's office with images of Mount Fuji, a Shinto shrine, and a bullet train, as well as introducing its designers as the children of people like geisha, samurai, sumo wrestlers, and ninjas.

A sequel with more varied gameplay options titled Flopon World was brought to the Japanese 3DO on September 14, 1995. This contained Uchū Seibutsu Flopon-kun 2, which was the version that was released in North America the month prior. This rendition was also a part of Short Warp, a minigame compilation of parodies of the developer's previous works that would serve as their final 3DO title on January 15, 1996. Eno was asked by 1UP.com in 2008 if he had any interest in bringing Trip'd to Nintendo DS or WiiWare. "Not really. I have no interest in my own past -- like, what I did in the past, what sold, how much, and so on," he answered. "Instead of working on something I did in the past, I would rather be working on something new. I want to move forward."

== Reception ==
Reception

Review scores
Publication	Score
GamePro	(3DO) 10/20
Next Generation	(3DO) 2/5
3DO Magazine	(3DO) 3/5
Dengeki PlayStation	(PS) 35/100, 45/100, 55/100, 65/100
Digital Press	(3DO) 6 / 10
Game Zero Magazine	(3DO) 16/50
MAN!AC	(3DO) 66%
VideoGames	(3DO) 8/10

The North American 3DO release of Trip'd has received a generally mediocre reaction from critics. Its gameplay was seen as derivative of previous puzzle titles while its more unique mechanics caused divided opinions. The staff of VideoGames praised the overall gameplay as fun and addictive, particularly in multiplayer. The magazine's Gabe Soria summarized, "If people like us, who see enough video games to make us blind, can be so impressed, it stands to reason something cool must be going on." While Stuart Wynne of 3DO Magazine was bored with the game's single-player experience, he lauded its multiplayer option as "arguably one of the best in a Tetris variant" and similarly admitted "there's never been a game which has got us so addicted as two-player Trip'd." Martin Gaksch of the German publication MAN!AC labeled Trip'd as a competent blend of Tetris and Columns and felt it offered solid computer opponents. Contraily, Next Generation felt that Trip'd's additions to the mechanics of Puyo Puyo "really only serve to complicate a wonderfully simple game, and make it more frustrating than innovative." GamePro criticized the game's slow pace and felt that only being able to adjust one tile in a triad per button press was frustrating. GameFan reporter Dan Granett echoed this, claiming that it took a great deal of physical energy to perform quick reactions using the stock 3DO gamepad and that it was a solitary blemish to a "would-be flawless puzzler."

Reception for the game's graphical and audio design was also mixed. Both GamePro and Game Zero Magazine condemned the game's lack variety in stage anesthetics and music options with the former declaring, "Three of the four modes use the same background, and the annoying music doesn't augment the gameplay. Volume control is a blessing." Wynne complimented the sound effects but described the inclusion of grotesque visual elements in the North American version of the game "a disaster". He conceded, "The best you can say about the new graphics is that they're mostly marginal to gameplay and you soon learn to ignore them." Granett was much more appreciative of these components, only conceding that the sound and music were "appropriately wacky – albeit repetitive." Soria revered the art direction, calling the game's "particularly Japanese sense of humor" one of its highlights.
