= You, Me, and the Cubes =

2009 video game

- Developer: From Yellow to Orange (Note: Co-developed with T&E Soft.)
- Publisher: Nintendo
- Director: Kenji Eno
- Producer: Hiroshi Sato
- Platform: Wii
- Release: JP: March 26, 2009; NA: September 21, 2009; EU: September 25, 2009
- Genre: Puzzle
- Modes: Single-player, multiplayer

You, Me, and the Cubes (Note: Japanese: きみとぼくと立体, Hepburn: Kimi to Boku to Rittai) is a 2009 puzzle video game developed by From Yellow to Orange and published by Nintendo for the Wii. Released in Japan on March 26, 2009 and internationally in September 2009 as a WiiWare title, it was the first game directed by Kenji Eno since the release of D2 (1999) and the last before his 2013 death.

== Gameplay ==
You, Me, and the Cubes is a puzzle game where the goal is to place humanoid figures named Fallos onto floating cubes, while maintaining their balance. Each level is split into six sub-levels – reflecting the six sides of a cube – in which the player is given a time limit and a required amount of Fallos to place on the stage, such that each cube is occupied with at least one Fallo. By shaking the Wii Remote, the player can create two Fallos, one male and one female, and then fling them onto the stage. Once they land, the Fallos may affect the stage's balance, making the cubes tilt in the process. If a Fallo loses their footing and falls off the stage, time is retracted from the time limit. After clearing each sub-level, the stage turns to a different side and a new cube is added to the scene, during which any Fallo that is not stabilized is dropped into the void. After clearing the final sub-level, the remaining Fallos are tallied and the player is graded by the number remaining on the stage.

As the player progresses through levels, they are greeted with various environmental hazards, as well as other cube types with different effects. In the game's co-operative mode, after a Fallo falls off the stage, enemies named Shades will appear and attempt to knock other Fallos off the cubes. They can be defeated by throwing a Fallo at them.

== Development ==
Following the release of D2 for the Dreamcast, Kenji Eno and his company Warp left the video game industry, choosing to focus on implementing services and branding for different companies under the name From Yellow to Orange. However, after seeing the Tokyo Game Show 2005 reveal of the Wii Remote, Eno became interested in developing a game for the Wii, and got in touch with Nintendo. The game was developed by a team of roughly ten people, with T&E Soft handling programming, design and sound implementation.

You, Me, and the Cubes was released by Nintendo on March 26, 2009 on the WiiWare service in Japan, and later in September that same year in North America and Europe.

== Reception ==
Reception

Aggregate score
Aggregator	Score
Metacritic	79/100

Review score
Publication	Score
IGN	8.5/10

You, Me, and the Cubes received generally positive reviews from critics. Philip J. Reed of Nintendo Life gave the game a 8/10 score, praising its simplistic yet logical and thoughtful gameplay. Lucas M. Thomas of IGN gave the game a 8.5/10 score, noting its strong gameplay and unique visual style. In contrast, bitmob of VentureBeat was disappointed by the game's shallowness but still appreciative its quirky nature.
