= Panic Restaurant =

1992 video game

- Developer: EIM
- Publisher: Taito
- Designer: Kenji Eno
- Programmer: Hideki Miura
- Composers: Hirohiko Takayama; Kenji Eno
- Platform: Nintendo Entertainment System
- Release: JP: April 24, 1992; NA: October 1992; EU: May 26, 1994
- Genre: Platform
- Mode: Single-player

Panic Restaurant, known in Japan as Wanpaku Kokkun no Gourmet World (わんぱくコックンのグルメワールド), is a 1992 platform game developed by EIM and published by Taito for the Nintendo Entertainment System.

Panic Restaurant stars a chef named Cookie who must navigate through his own restaurant, which has been cursed by a rival chef named Ohdove. Cookie has to battle evil food monsters with kitchen utensil weapons in six levels before taking on Ohdove in a final battle.

== Development ==
Kenji Eno was the game's designer. The names of the game's main character and villain were changed when the game was localized for Western audiences. In the Japanese version, the hero is a chef named Kokkun. The main villain was named "Hors d'Oeuvre"; the name "Ohdove" was the result of an incorrect transliteration of a French word to Japanese and then to English. In the overseas versions the "Clobber Pan" replaced the chef's head as the default weapon. Also, the best weapon was the "Wacky Pan", which did not exist in the Japanese version.

== Reception ==
Reception

Review scores
| Publication | Score |
|---|---|
| Famitsu | 23/40 |
| GamePro | 4/5 (Note: GamePro gave scores of 4.0, 3.5, 4.0, and 4.5 for graphics, sound, control, and fun factor) |
| HobbyConsolas | 88% |
| Nintendo Power | 3.55/5 (Note: Average of component scores of 3.4, 3.5, 3.4, and 3.8.) |
| Video Games (DE) | 73% |
| Ação Games | 11/16 |
| Nintendo Acción | 10/16 |
| Play Time | 59% |
| Power Unlimited | 80/100 |

Panic Restaurant received generally positive reviews from video game critics. Power Unlimited gave a score of 80% commenting: "Panic Restaurant is one of the tastiest platform games of all time. You work your way through the six levels in this game, because there is good food everywhere. The juicy graphics and crunchy humor only add to this."
