= Superman 64 =

1999 video game

Superman: The New Superman Adventures
- North American box art
- Developer: Titus Interactive
- Publisher: Titus Interactive
- Director: Rob Stevens (DVT)
- Producer: Eric Caen
- Executive producer(s): J.C. Methiaz
- Programmers: Benoit Blanchard; Jacques Chevalier; Laurent Duplessis; Francois Maingaud; J.M. Masson
- Composer: WAAM
- Series: Superman
- Platform: Nintendo 64
- Release: NA: May 29, 1999; EU: July 23, 1999
- Genre: Action-adventure
- Modes: Single-player, multiplayer

Superman: The New Superman Adventures, (Note: A typo on the box art states "Aventures" instead of "Adventures", although "aventures" is the French word for "adventures" in Titus Interactive's native language.) commonly referred to as Superman 64, is a 1999 action-adventure game developed and published by Titus Interactive for the Nintendo 64. It is based on the animated television series Superman: The Animated Series, and is the first 3D video game featuring Superman.

In the game, Lex Luthor has trapped Jimmy Olsen, Lois Lane, and Professor Hamilton in a virtual reality version of Metropolis that he created with the help of Brainiac, leaving it up to Superman to save them and dismantle the virtual world. The game shifts between outdoor levels, where the player flies through rings while rescuing civilians, and indoor levels, where the player searches for access cards, activates computers, and battles villains such as Brainiac, Mala, Metallo, Darkseid, and Parasite.

The development of Superman began in 1997 and was largely hindered by constraints between Titus and the game's licensors, Warner Bros. and DC Comics, leaving little room to refine the gameplay. BlueSky Software attempted to redo the game for the PlayStation, but this version was ultimately canceled, as Titus's license with Warner Bros. had expired by the time it was completed.

The game was released in North America on May 29, 1999, and in Europe on July 23, 1999. With three E3 presentations and positive press coverage prior to its release, Superman 64 achieved strong sales and favorable consumer reception; however, critical reviews were extremely negative, criticizing its unresponsive controls, technical flaws, repetitive gameplay, overuse of distance fog, and poor graphics. It is widely regarded as one of the worst video games ever made.

== Gameplay ==
Superman carrying a police car in the First Ride level

Superman is a three-dimensional action-adventure platform game in which the player takes on the role of the titular hero, saving the citizens of Metropolis, including Lois Lane, Jimmy Olsen, and Professor Hamilton, from a virtual reality version of the city created by Lex Luthor. This virtual Metropolis is filled with "Kryptonite fog", an apparent attempt by Luthor to diminish Superman's abilities. However, this is actually distance fog, a technique used to mask the game's draw distance.

In the main single-player mode, the player assumes the role of Superman, who is challenged by Luthor to complete various tasks and puzzles. Superman can fly, punch enemies, and use his super-strength to lift and carry large objects. Other superpowers, including heat vision, freeze breath, X-ray vision, super speed, and reprogramming (where Superman reprograms an enemy to help fight off other enemies), are accessible only through the collection of power-ups found in certain levels and have limited reserves. If Superman is attacked by enemies, hazards, or comes too close to Kryptonite, his health will decrease. The game ends if Superman loses all his health, requiring the player to restart the current mission. The player also faces game over if a civilian character is attacked or if the time limits imposed on various missions expire before completion.

Superman consists of fourteen levels, alternating between outdoor and indoor environments. The indoor levels involve combat, exploring environments to find access codes to locked areas, activating computers, solving puzzles to achieve objectives, and battling villains such as Mala, Metallo, Darkseid, and Brainiac, who is responsible for programming the computers that trap them in Luthor's virtual reality. The outdoor stages consist of traveling to the next indoor mission while flying through rings and rescuing civilians from enemies and hazards. Several missions must be completed within time limits. Superman: The New Superman Aventures features three difficulty modes: Easy, Normal, and Superman. In Easy mode, the player does not need to fly through rings during the ride stages. The penultimate ride stage and penultimate regular stage are playable only in Normal and Superman modes, while the final ride stage and regular stage are accessible only in Superman mode. Despite this, it is possible to complete the game without encountering a single ring if the player starts in Easy mode, as there is an option to switch from Easy to Normal mode that skips the penultimate ride stage, and an option to switch from Normal mode to Superman mode that skips the final ride stage. The time available to complete missions also decreases as the difficulty increases.

The game features two multiplayer modes—a racing mode and a battle mode—allowing play with up to four people. In battle mode, players must defeat their opponents by throwing various weapons and items at them. In racing mode, players control a spaceship while rings are shot from the backside of one opponent.

== Development ==
=== Conception ===
Eric Caen, one of the founders of the French developer Titus Interactive, secured the rights from WB Licensing to produce a Superman game during the development of The Animated Series. After learning about the upcoming show in the Los Angeles offices of Titus, Caen pursued the license since no other company had shown interest. He recalled in a 2015 interview that Warner Bros. "asked me three times if I was sure of what I was doing." In early 1997, Titus signed a licensing deal with Warner Bros. to develop games based on Superman: The Animated Series for the Nintendo 64, PlayStation, and Game Boy. The development team for each port consisted of two programmers and six to nine artists. The Game Boy game was completed and released by the end of that year.

Caen's initial plan envisioned a style of gameplay that only Tomb Raider (1996) had attempted before, featuring a 3D open world action-adventure video game that incorporated real-time strategy elements, allowing players to genuinely behave as a superhero. As he explained, "it would stretch the Nintendo 64 to its limits, feature Superman's ability to fly and fight, and include all of his superpowers." However, this concept proved too ambitious for the Nintendo 64's limitations. Consequently, less than ten percent of the original design made it into the final product.

=== Production ===
The Nintendo 64 game's development lasted two years. Titus' technical director Rob Stevens summarized the development as "pretty much a disaster from start to finish", boiling it down to "management problems, organizational problems, and inexperienced programmers". He explained that a plan to release the game before Tim Burton's Superman Lives, which was ultimately cancelled, rushed development. "If you start off with a short-term development," Stevens explained, "and then have an extension, it's no good." Near the end of development, Nintendo provided technical support to Titus.

Only a few days after the deal was finalized, the Warner Bros. licensing team underwent a change. According to Caen's testimony, the new group immediately disliked Titus and the project, attempting to halt its development. Their first demand was to transform Superman into a Sim City-style game, where Superman would act as the mayor of Metropolis rather than being featured in an action game. Warner Bros. became increasingly coercive after Titus rejected this idea, disregarding any decisions made by the French developer. Often, their rationale for rejection was that Superman would never engage in the activities Titus proposed. Elements that survived, such as Superman swimming underwater, were retained only after Titus staff members presented documentation from the original Superman comics.

Several changes were mandated to ensure that Superman was portrayed positively. In addition to limiting Superman's powers and removing destructible architecture, the game was set in a virtual world to prevent him from harming "real" people. Although the ring stages were initially intended as tutorial sections, they became a regular part of gameplay due to other changes. These conflicts led to a prolonged production process, where "it took [Titus] months to get every single character approved", resulting in an inability to address bugs and issues related to collision detection and controls, which would later be criticized in the final product.

=== Pre-release publicity ===
Superman was showcased at three E3 events in 1997, 1998, and 1999. Some publications unofficially referred to the game as Superman 64 since the 1997 E3 event, as evidenced by its coverage in Game Informer. The 1997 presentation did not disclose that the game took place in a virtual world but did reveal its premise: Superman attempting to save Lois and Metropolis from Lex Luthor's dangerous creation, the Lexoskel-5000. Additionally, it showcased models of empty rooms, a concept model of Lex Luthor, and highlighted Superman's X-ray vision power, which utilized the console's graphical capabilities effectively. An IGN journalist covering the event found little promise in the game, stating, "For a true fan, the game probably looked great because it was at least something to show, but to the casual observer or the jaded critic, the game just looked poor." However, Animation World Network was more optimistic, asserting that the game appeared to feature "stunning 3D environments, various fight levels, and rescue operations". At the time of the 1997 E3 showing, the release date was scheduled for late 1997, but it was ultimately delayed.

Titus announced that Superman was approximately 85–95% complete in March 1998. However, the game faced further delays following the 1998 E3 showing due to gameplay criticisms. On August 24, Titus released 3D character models and map sheets of the levels. The magazine GamePro, describing the game as an "E3 showstopper", praised its "good-looking graphics".

In June 1998, GameFan published the first screenshots of completed parts of Superman, showcasing views of interiors, Metropolis, and the 3D model of Superman. The magazine expressed enthusiasm for the game, with journalist ECM noting that other staff members were "drooling over these first-look shots". He suggested that the game "could be one of the hotter N64 titles of the year", even with heavyweights like The Legend of Zelda: Ocarina of Time and Banjo-Kazooie on the horizon. He highlighted the game's "astounding" visuals—aside from the fog in the Metropolis shots—and stated it was "set to raise the bar on the N64 again" with its "clean textures and smooth animation". ECM also shared gameplay details, mentioning "an assortment of missions numbering in the twenties" and Superman's powers like X-ray and Heat Vision, as well as the inclusion of villains like Brainiac and Bizarro.

In July 1998, Gamers' Republic reported that Superman would consist of 15 stages where the playable character would be "beating up bad guys and solving puzzles while trying to find the kryptonite diffusers in each level." The publication also revealed a four-player battle mode, which it positively compared to Star Fox; it praised the level design and the incorporation of Superman's powers.

In its August 1998 issue, Nintendo Magazine preview coverage indicated that Titus had not yet implemented the non-tutorial ring stages or the virtual world setting within the game's plot. The premise was described as Lex Luthor trapping all of Metropolis citizens in a "deadly Kryptonite fog". Despite this, the magazine expressed optimism for the final product, noting it was "packed with great ideas" and that the four-player mode looked promising.

In the December issue, which had changed its name to Nintendo Official Magazine, a follow-up preview highlighted more of Superman's abilities in the game. These included breaking through bricks, lifting cars and humans, punching, and utilizing heat vision and ice breath. The magazine also announced a North American release date of January 1999, with a spring date set for Europe.

A press release in October 1998 revealed that the release date for Superman 64 was scheduled for November 16, 1998. The announcement also detailed a "huge promotional campaign" that would include in-store promotions, displays, advertising across television, online, and print media. Promotional items planned for the campaign included standees, t-shirts, game footage, videotapes, and oversized boxes.

Superman was one of five Nintendo 64 games showcased at the 1999 Tokyo Game Show.

=== PlayStation version ===
After the critical failure of the Nintendo 64 version, Titus tasked BlueSky Software with completely redesigning Superman for the PlayStation. The game received approval from Sony; however, the license from Warner Bros. had expired, and Titus was unable to secure a new one, resulting in the game's cancellation in 2000. According to Caen, after Warner Bros. "forced us to kill the PlayStation version", the company planned to pay Titus a litigation settlement as compensation for its abusive behavior towards the developer. A build of the game, dated June 22, 2000, was eventually uploaded to MediaFire on November 28, 2020, by Richard Evan Mandel, who announced and linked to the build's release via a journal post on his DeviantArt page. Before the DeviantArt page was deleted, a user on the Internet Archive downloaded the build and made it available on the archive.

== Release ==
NPD Group data reported that Superman was a top-ten seller in North America during the weeks of June 1999. In July of that same year, Titus announced that Superman had become the third best-selling game for the N64. Over 500,000 units were sold. Eric Caen projected in 1998 that sales would reach around a million. Titus also reported that consumer feedback, obtained through a mail-in registration, was "overwhelming[ly] positive", with "more than 70% of Superman's target audience, aged 6 to 11 years, rating the game as an 'A' title".

== Critical reception ==
Contemporaneous reception

Aggregate score
Aggregator	Score
GameRankings	23%

Review scores
Publication	Score
AllGame	1/5
Consoles +	55%
Electronic Gaming Monthly	0.5/10, 4/10, 2/10, 1.5/10
EP Daily	3/10
Game Informer	1.25/10
GameRevolution	F
GameSpot	1.3/10
Hyper	10%
IGN	3.4/10
Jeuxvideo.com	9/20
Mega Fun	9%
N64 Magazine	14%
Next Generation	1/5
Nintendo Power	4.7/10
Official Nintendo Magazine	49%
Super Game Power	3.8/5
Video Games (DE)	21%

Award
Publication	Award
EGM	Biggest Gaming Industry "Slick Disaster"

Upon release, Superman 64 was claimed to be one of the worst games of all time by critics. Matt Casamassina of IGN suggested that it was "executed so poorly that it actually serves to butcher the reputation of the prominent action hero". Casamassina speculated that the developer had not "put forth any priorities for this title other than to finish it", commenting that the game had a "rushed, careless feel". The multiplayer modes received slightly better reviews than the single-player story mode, although issues with slowdown and difficulty controlling the space pod were noted.

The controls were criticized for being confusing and difficult to use. Commands for various actions were reported to be either unresponsive or inconsistent, particularly regarding flying, landing, and picking up objects. Tim Weaver of N64 Magazine complained that "the only way to stop flying is to crash into a solid object, preferably a wall", and that "you always have to press forward to go forward, even if you're facing into the camera". Conversely, Nintendo Magazine System, the official Nintendo magazine of Australia, countered these complaints about the flying controls, reasoning that they were simple if the player read the instruction manual. Other technical problems were reported to be common, including bugs, unfavorable camera angles, poor enemy AI, broken frame rates, clipping of environments and objects, and inadequate collision detection.

Some critics found the missions too easy, unengaging, and nonsensical; Hardcore Gaming 101's John Sczepaniak even went so far as to call them "obscenely stupid". He and other critics also panned the ridiculous-looking fights with enemies, with Hardcore Gaming 101 writing, "melee combat is slow, awkward, and imprecise, leading to much flailing of limbs".

Critics from Electronic Gaming Monthly noted the wasted potential of a game based on the Superman animated series, citing a "great story, interesting characters, plenty of villains", and the opportunity to fight criminals in 3D landscapes. Only a few reviewers suggested that Superman 64's gameplay might have been conceptually good. Jeuxvideo.com described the missions as action-packed and diverse, while Nintendo Power claimed that it was ambitious for a Superman game to attempt to be more than just "a brawler with some flight and superpowers thrown in". Critics found certain concepts unsuitable for a game centered around the titular hero, particularly the mechanic of flying through rings and limitations on lives and the need for power-ups.

Some reviewers praised the visuals for their closeness to the animated series, as well as the inclusion of its original voice actors. However, the graphics were widely condemned as "basic" and subpar for a Nintendo 64 game released in 1999. Frequent criticism centered on the excessive distance fog and the detail-less, repetitive textures. Sczepaniak noted that the flat textures of Metropolis made it resemble a Mode 7 background in a Super NES game. Reviews also criticized the character animations, especially those of Superman.

Responses to the audio were mixed. The music received lukewarm appreciation from some publications, including Jeuxvideo.com who noted its atmospheric quality but criticized its lack of stylistic variation. However, other sources, including GameSpot, criticized the repetitiveness of the soundtrack. GameSpot also remarked, "the sparse voice work even changes at one point, from Man of Steel actors to someone who sounds nothing like the lead of the show". As Hyper proclaimed, "the soundtrack is more than capable of causing spontaneous aneurysms at 50 paces, and the handful of canned smashing moves do a great job of driving home the horror".

== Legacy ==
Retrospective reception

Review score
Publication	Score
Shacknews	1/10

Statements regarding Superman 64 as one of the worst video games of all time have persisted in later years, including one of the worst highly-anticipated video games. The game has appeared on all-time worst lists, overall and in the categories of superhero adaptations and N64 titles, from various publications, including Electronic Gaming Monthly (2013), The Guardian (2015), SVG.com (2020), and topping lists of GameSpy (2004), GameTrailers (2006), and Den of Geek (2024). It has also appeared on worst-of-decade lists from Filter and Nintendo Power. It continues to be recognized as the all-time worst of the Superman video games, which are generally not well received.

As of 2017, Superman 64 holds the Guinness World Record for the lowest-rated superhero game, citing its Gamerankings aggregate score of 22.9%. In a report from 2018, The Guardian noted, "Superman 64 has cultivated a fanbase of curious masochists eager to see how bad it really is. Twitch and YouTube host plenty of videos dedicated to the anti-glory of Superman 64, some of them created by people who were barely born when it was released." Superman 64 ranked number 11 in an Uproxx list of the top 100 Nintendo 64 games, based on 250,849 user ratings from various websites. Publication writer Derrick Rossignol expressed confusion over the ranking: "I attribute that to users ironically giving the game many positive ratings over the years. Thankfully, though, those shenanigans don't seem prevalent in the data, and Superman is the only notable head-scratcher that I noticed."

== See also ==
- List of video games notable for negative reception
