= Superman (1988 video game) =

- North American arcade flyer
- Developer: Taito
- Publisher: Taito
- Director: Toshiyuki Nishimura
- Designers: Hidehiro Fujiwara; Noboru Yasukawa (hardware)
- Programmers: Tohru Sugawara; Hideaki Tomioka; Hideki Hashimoto; Mari Iwano; Tadakazu Aono
- Artists: Yoshihiko Wakita; Junji Yarita; Taira Sanuki; Shinobu Iwabuchi; Akira Saito; Minori Ishino; Takako Kojima; Toshiyuki Nishimura
- Composers: Masahiko Takaki; Kazuyuki Onui; Shizuo Aizawa; Takami Asano
- Series: Superman
- Platform: Arcade
- Release: NA: January 1989; JP: February 1989
- Genres: Beat 'em up, shoot 'em up
- Modes: Single-player, multiplayer
- Arcade system: Taito X System

Superman is a 1989 beat 'em up video game featuring the DC Comics character of the same name, developed and published by Taito for arcades. While it is not directly based on the original Superman film series, the "Superman Main Theme" and "Can You Read My Mind" from the Superman films are used as background music throughout much of the game.

The player assumes the role of Superman, who must fight through five levels to make the world safe from the evil Emperor Zaas, a character exclusive to this game. The game can be played by up to two players simultaneously, with the second player taking control of another Superman with a different colored costume.

== Gameplay ==
Superman faces a boss during the vertically scrolling part of game's first level.

The player takes control of Superman, who must fight through five levels to make the world safe from the evil Emperor Zaas, a villain similar to Brainiac. The first player takes control of the traditional blue Superman, while the second player takes control of a red Superman with a grey cape. The title starts out in Metropolis before going to San Francisco, Las Vegas, and Washington, D.C. Superman is able to punch, kick and fly. He can also use a projectile "Sonic Blast" attack when the player holds down then releases the punch button. There are also objects in the levels he can throw and/or break. Some of these objects release blue crystals that can restore Superman's energy, yellow crystals that allow the player to throw one projectile attack without charging or red crystals in flying stages that defeat all the enemies on the screen. The first four levels have three-parts - a side-scrolling part, followed by a vertically scrolling flying part and a final side-scrolling shooter part where Superman uses heat vision instead of kicking and can destroy or dodge obstacles such as rocks. Each part has a boss at the end. The final level, the main boss' spaceship, adds a side-scrolling shooting section to the beginning and an extra final boss fight at the end.

=== Second player ===
The second player's Superman is identical to the first player's blue Superman, except for the color scheme. Whereas the first player controls Superman in his traditional color scheme (blue tights with a red cape, trunks and boots), the second Superman wears red tights with grey cape, trunks and boots. The presence of this alternate Superman is never explained in the game and is only intended as a co-operative gameplay mechanic.

== Reception ==
In Japan, Game Machine listed Superman as the fifth most successful table arcade unit of March 1989. The game was met with mixed reception from reviewers since its release. Computer and Video Games gave the game a positive outlook. Your Sinclair's Ciarán Brennan gave the title an overall negative outlook. ACE gave it a mixed outlook. The Games Machine's Robin Hogg also gave it an overall mixed outlook. AllGame's Brad Cook gave it a two out of five stars rating.
