= Kenji Eno =

Japanese musician and video game designer (1970–2013)

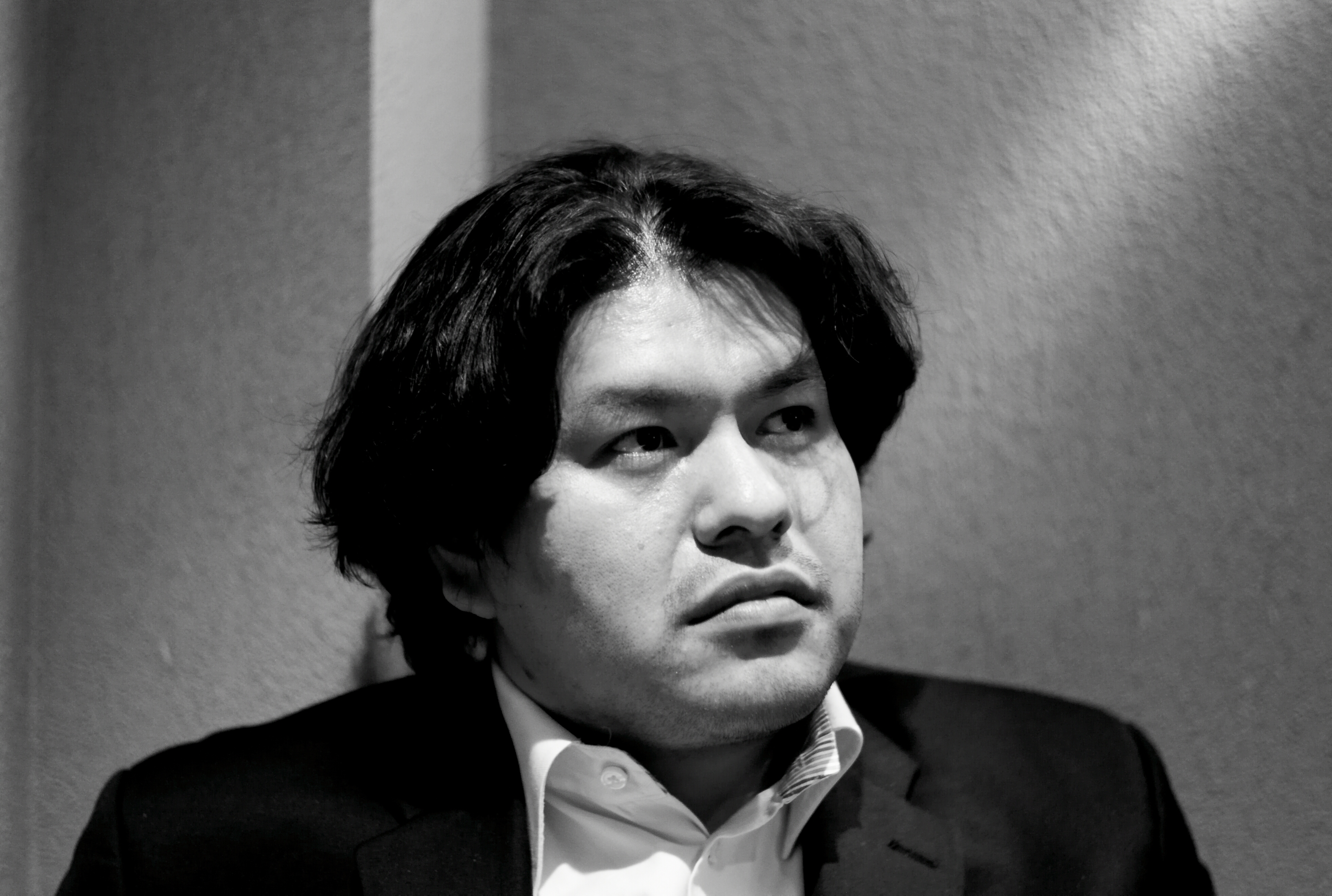
- Kenji Eno in 2007
- Born: May 5, 1970; Arakawa, Tokyo, Japan
- Died: February 20, 2013 (aged 42); Tokyo, Japan
- Occupations: Composer, game designer
- Known for: D · D2; Enemy Zero; Real Sound

Kenji Eno (飯野賢治, Japanese pronunciation: [iꜜːno̞ ke̞ꜜɲd͡ʑi], Iino Kenji; May 5, 1970 – February 20, 2013) was a Japanese musician and video game designer. He gained a reputation as a maverick during the mid-1990s for creating unorthodox games like Real Sound and is perhaps best remembered today for his rebellious marketing techniques. Outside of his homeland he was best known for his survival horror video games, D and Enemy Zero. Apart from creating video games, Eno was also a well-regarded electronic musician and he created the scores for several of his games. Eno founded the video game development companies EIM, Warp (later called Super Warp), and From Yellow to Orange. He also worked in a variety of fields apart from video games and music including the automotive, cellphone, tobacco, and hotel industries.

== Career ==
Uncommonly interested in video games and music from a young age, Eno had experimented extensively with programming and recording, and one of his first games, Towadoko Murder Case, placed in a regional game contest. Eno's first job in the industry was with the nascent video game company, Interlink (responsible for the small 1989 hit, Moulin Rouge War Chronicle: Blaze of Melville (Moulin Rouge Senki: Melville no Honoo)). With Interlink, Eno was given a small degree of control in his projects and the company soon released a game in the Ultra Series under his co-planning.

Unsatisfied with his role at Interlink, and interested in more direct control over the projects, Eno used his savings to found the video game development contract company, EIM, Ltd. ("Entertainment Imagination and Magnificence") (有限会社EIM, Yuugen Gaisha EIM) in 1989. Eno's plan for EIM was largely modeled upon Interlink, however as a strict contract company EIM focused solely on sequels and spin-off titles. Though Eno was now able to choose projects and control the company's output through his selections, he remained unsatisfied by the limitations imposed on EIM by the need to be faithful to the creative visions of the groups that contracted EIM's services. For this reason as well as growing mental instability, Eno dissolved EIM in 1992 and began work as a consultant to an automotive manufacturer.

=== Warp and From Yellow to Orange ===
In 1994, after having his interest in games revitalized by trips to Macworld 1994 and Be-In, a local video game expo, Eno formed Warp with a small team of programmers and designers including animators Fumito Ueda (Ico and Shadow of the Colossus), Takeshi Nozue (Final Fantasy VII Advent Children) and Ichiro Itano (Macross), all of whom later became famous under different employment. While EIM had been modeled after Interlink, Eno modeled Warp after Panasonic's 3DO department. Warp produced a number of titles for various platforms, however its main output consisted of games designed for the 3DO Interactive Multiplayer. Under Eno's management, Warp's games were noted for their outlandishness and unconventional production. The game Short Warp, for example, notably came shipped with condom feelies, and the game Real Sound shipped with a bag of "herb seeds". Eno took up radio broadcasting during this period. He developed a maverick reputation during his work with Warp, and shocked the Japanese video game press in a dramatic 1996 press conference where he burned bridges with Sony by displaying a video depicting the PlayStation logo morphing into the logo for Sega Saturn to indicate that Warp's latest game, Enemy Zero, would be a Saturn exclusive. Furthering this reputation, at the 1996 Tokyo Game Show Warp displayed a video of themselves dancing and singing a song with lyrics roughly translated as "Enemy Zero is a good game, Warp is a good company", at the end of which Eno threw to the floor a plush doll of Muumuu, the mascot of Sony's hit game Jumping Flash!. Warp's last four titles were designed exclusively for Sega. Due in part to the failure of the 3DO Interactive Multiplayer as a video game console, in part to Eno's growing episodes of mental instability, and dogged by mediocre sales figures for their non-3DO games, Warp disbanded shortly after the release of D2 in 2000.

Thereafter, Warp was renamed Superwarp. Superwarp diverged from Warp in concentrating on DVDs, network services, and online music. With Superwarp, Eno worked on 20 or 30 widely diverse projects including work with NTT DoCoMo, creation of a cell-phone purchase interface for Coca-Cola vending machines, marketing cigarettes, and designing a trendy hotel. Eno also began blogging during this period. Superwarp was disbanded in 2005 without having released a single video game title. Eno explained that this was his final act of distancing himself from his past at WARP.

Eno founded From Yellow to Orange (sometimes abbreviated as fyto) in 2001 and headed the company until his death. In 2006, Eno announced that From Yellow to Orange was in the process of designing a game and, during an interview at E3 2006, he hinted that the game would be designed for Nintendo's Wii. In the September 2008 issue of Electronic Gaming Monthly, Eno stated in an interview that he was working on a game that would be revealed either in the "next issue, or the next, next issue of EGM." On March 23, 2009, Nintendo released You, Me, and the Cubes on the Wii's downloadable games service, WiiWare, with Eno's company fyto developing. Eno cited the Wii Remote as a key motivation of his return to game development.

In August 2008 Kenji Eno teamed up with Kenichi Nishi (Chibi-Robo!, Captain Rainbow, etc.) under the control of Fieldsystem, Inc. to write the score for and help develop Newtonica, a game for the iPhone and iPod Touch.

== Personal life ==
Eno attended a school for gifted children in his younger years, however the regular course of his childhood was greatly affected by the disappearance of his mother from his life during his second year of elementary school. Eno dropped out of high school at age 17 and, after brief jobs at Canon and a telephone-appointment company, he soon entered the video game industry. Videogames had always played an important role in his life as he started to visit arcade game rooms from an early age. He cites Space Invaders and Pac-Man as two of the most influential games that motivated him to pursue a career in game design. Eno got married during the development of D, he was not planning on having kids as he felt he wasn't economically stable "I was pretty broke back then, living in a one bed room apartment", however with the success of D Eno stated that he was able to "afford kids".

In a 1997 interview Eno said that his best friend is Kazutoshi Iida, creator of the video games Aquanaut's Holiday and Tail of the Sun. Eno has claimed influence from electronic group, Yellow Magic Orchestra.

=== Death ===
Eno died on February 20, 2013, due to heart failure brought on by hypertension.

== Music ==
Eno's musical achievements are in general lesser known outside of Japan, although they have enjoyed more mainstream success than his video games. Eno has produced several albums independently as well as collaborated on albums such as The Cinematic Orchestra's Remixes 1998–2000. Eno is also credited with having composed music for several of his games including Juuouki, Casino Kid 2, Sunman, and the dark ambient scores to D and D2. Most recently he wrote the score for the Fieldsystem game, Newtonica.

== Games ==
=== Independently produced ===
- Towadako Murder Case (十和田湖殺人事件, Towadako Satsujin Jiken)

=== With Interlink ===
- Juuouki (Famicom, 1990) – Sound Creator
- SD Hero Soukessen: Taose! Aku no Gundan (Famicom, 1990) – Supervisor, Musician
- Ultraman Club 2: Kaettekita Ultraman Club (ウルトラマン倶楽部2 帰ってきたウルトラマン倶楽部) (Famicom, 1990) – Planner

=== With EIM, Ltd. ===
- Parallel World (NES, 1990)
- Time Zone (たいむゾーン) (Famicom, 1991) – Concept
- Casino Kid 2 (NES, 1992) – Sound Programmer, Music Composer
- Panic Restaurant (わんぱくコックンのグルメワールド, Wanpaku Kokkun no Gourmet World) (NES, 1992) – Concept, Supervisor, Music Composer
- Miyasu Nonki no Quiz 18-kin (Arcade, 1992)
- Kyouryuu Densetsu (Famicom, unreleased)
- Superman/Sunman (NES, unreleased) – Planner, Director

=== With WARP, Inc. ===
- Totsugeki Kikan (Karakuri) Megadasu!! (突撃機関メガダす!! "Attack Engine Mega!!") (3DO, 1994)
- Flupon: Space Biology (宇宙生物フロポン君, Uchuu Seibutsu Furopon Kun) (3DO, 1994)
- D (Dの食卓, D no Shokutaku "D's Dinning Table") (Sega Saturn/3DO, 1995)
  - D: Complete Graphics version (Dの食卓 コンプリートグラフィックス) (PS1, 1995)
  - D: Director's Cut version (Dの食卓 ディレクターズカット) (3DO, 1996)
- Flupon: Space Biology P! (宇宙生物フロポン君P!, Uchuu Seibutsu Furopon Kun P!) (PS1, 1995)
- Oyaji Hunter Mahjong (3DO, 1995)
- Trip'd (フロポンワールド, Furopon Warudo; also Flupon World) (3DO/PS1, 1995)
- Short Warp (ショートワープ) (3DO, 1996)
- Enemy Zero (エネミー・ゼロ) (Sega Saturn, 1996; PC, 1998)
- Real Sound: Kaze no Regret (リアルサウンド 〜風のリグレット〜 "Real Sound: The Winds of Regret") (Sega Saturn, 1997; Dreamcast, 1999)
- Sega Rally 2 (セガラリー 2) (Dreamcast, 1998) – Musician
- D2 (Dの食卓2, D no Shokutaku 2 "D's Dinning Table 2") (Dreamcast, 1999)

=== With From Yellow to Orange ===
- You, Me, and the Cubes (きみとぼくと立体, Kimi to Boku to Rittai) (Wii, 2009)

=== External contract work ===
- newtonica (iPhone/iPod Touch, 2008) (Fieldsystem, Inc.) – Music Composer
- newtonica 2 (iPhone/iPod Touch, 2008) (Fieldsystem, Inc.)
- newtonica 2 resort (iPhone/iPod Touch, 2009) (Fieldsystem, Inc.)
- One-Dot Enemies (iPhone, 2009) (Studio-Kura) – Designer

== Published works ==
- Games Super 27 Years Life (ゲーム Super 27 Years Life) (1997)
- Super hit game studies (スーパーヒットゲーム学) (1998, conversations with other game developers)
- Warp Company Profile (ワープ会社案内) (1998)
- 2003 Kenji Eno Dialogue Collection (2003 飯野賢治対談集) (1999)
- The book of Kenji Eno (飯野賢治の本) (1999)
- The Red Book Rain Waltz RE (レッドブック ワルツの雨 RE) (2006, with Ryusui Seiryoin)
- Dear Son, (息子へ) (2011)
