= EIM (video game developer) =

Japanese video game developer

EIM Group Ltd.
- Native name: 有限会社EIM
- Romanized name: Yugen-gaisha ī ai emu
- Type: Defunct
- Industry: Video games
- Founded: 1989
- Headquarters: Tokyo, Japan,
- Key people: Kenji Eno

EIM Group (有限会社EIM, Yuugen-gaisha EIM) ("Entertainment Imagination and Magnificence") was a Japanese game development company established in 1989 by Kenji Eno, who later started Warp.

== Games ==
Year	Title	Japanese title	Publisher	Platform	Note
1990	Parallel World	ぱられるワールド	Varie	Famicom	
1991	Time Zone	たいむゾーン	Sigma Entertainment	Famicom	
1992	Panic Restaurant	わんぱくコックンのグルメワールド (Wanpaku Kokkun no Gourmet World)	Taito	NES Famicom	
1992	Adventure Quiz: Capcom World 2	アドベンチャークイズ カプコンワールド2	Capcom	Arcade	creation of some quiz only
1992	Miyasu Nonki no Quiz 18-kin - Dr. Ecchan no Shinryo-shitsu	みやすのんきのクイズ18禁 - Dr.エッちゃんの診療室	Video System	Arcade	
1992	Casino Kid 2	n/a	SOFEL	NES	music/sound only
1993	SD Gundam Sangokushi Rainbow Tairiku Senki	SDガンダム三国志 レインボー大陸戦記	Banpresto	Arcade	
	Kyouryuu Densetsu	恐竜伝説	HAL Laboratory	Famicom	unreleased
	Sunman	n/a	Sunsoft	NES	unreleased

== See also ==
- Kenji Eno
