= D2 (video game) =

1999 video game

- North American box art
- Developer: Warp
- Publishers: JP: Warp; NA: Sega
- Director: Kenji Eno
- Writer: Yuji Sakamoto
- Composer: Kenji Eno
- Platform: Dreamcast
- Release: JP: December 23, 1999; NA: August 22, 2000
- Genres: Action-adventure, survival horror
- Mode: Single-player

D2 (Note: D2 (Ｄの食卓2, Dī no Shokutaku Tsū; lit. "D's Dining Table 2")) is a survival horror video game developed by Warp for the Dreamcast. Directed by Kenji Eno, it was published by Warp in Japan in 1999 and by Sega in North America in 2000. D2 stars the "digital actress" Laura, but has an independent story unrelated to the original D, and uses action-oriented gameplay in contrast to the puzzle-driven D.

== Gameplay ==
Laura searching for items in the polar environments

The game has a few different kinds of gameplay. The majority of D2 involves exploring the Canadian wilderness from a third-person perspective while interior locations are encountered in a first-person perspective. While exploring the wilderness, the player encounters random battles, much like those of a role-playing video game. When fighting monsters, the player cannot move Laura, but only aim her weapons. Defeating these creatures earns Laura experience points, which are used to level Laura up, increasing her health limit. Laura is initially equipped with a submachine gun with unlimited ammunition and a hunting rifle, which is used to hunt animals for meat which she can use to regain health.

In terms of the hunting feature, animals Laura kills for meat are totaled up during gameplay and on the Options screen, and players can see how many kills she has collected as well as any medals given. Additionally, Laura has a camera that she can use to take pictures any time in the game (except during cinematics). Players can also save the pictures to a VMU and view them later on.

== Plot ==
The game opens with Laura Parton falling asleep on an airplane trip to an undisclosed location. After being jolted awake by a tone over the airplane's PA system and a friendly conversation with a fellow passenger named David, a group of terrorists, who seem to be guided by some kind of mysterious cultist chanting to himself, suddenly and violently takes control of the plane. David, who turns out to be a special agent within the FBI, attempts to stop the terrorists, but he is thwarted when a meteorite strikes the plane, sending it crashing into the Canadian wilderness. After a series of bad dreams, Laura awakens in a small cabin being cared for by Kimberly Fox, a poet, and songwriter who also survived the crash. She explains that ten days have passed since the accident, although Kimberly had only found her some distance from the crash site two days prior, leaving a strange eight-day gap where she was mysteriously taken care of. The moment of peace is broken when another survivor, one of the hijackers, staggers into the cabin before suddenly transforming into a hideous plant-like monster. Here, Laura and Kimberly meet Parker Jackson, a CETI researcher and fellow crash survivor who drives out the monster, only to be driven out himself by a distrusting Kimberly.

Laura then sets out into the wilderness in order to investigate the possibility of contacting the outside world and seeking out other survivors only to discover that more strange, hideous creatures are lurking in the area, as something is causing the crash survivors to mutate into the very same monsters she must avoid and battle while traveling through the region. She is driven deeper into the mystery when she must venture into an abandoned mining facility in order to locate Jannie, a lost little girl Kimberly had found along with Laura and one of the plane's former passengers.

== Development ==
Development for D2 started as a premier game for the cancelled Panasonic M2 console, the successor to the 3DO console. The 3DO Company, with which Warp had a good working relationship, had suggested Warp create a sequel to D for their new console.

In this early version, a pregnant Laura is on a passenger flight to Romania which is attacked by a supernatural force. The plane crashes and her unborn child is spirited away by the Devil to medieval Transylvania, to be the child of a widowed duke who sold his soul for a son. The player would have taken the role of Laura's son as he enters adulthood, and must escape a large castle and fight the Devil to save his father. Unlike the original D, but like the D2 that was released for Dreamcast, the game was to feature full-motion video cutscenes but gameplay entirely played out with real-time graphics, and consisting of both puzzle solving and combat.

D2 was the first M2 game for which screenshots from a playable version were released to the public. Warp employed their usual unorthodox promotional tactics during development. For the first two days of the April 1997 Tokyo Game Show, Warp did not show any games, instead holding a celebration of the arrival of the cherry blossom season at their booth, before finally showing a demo of D2 on the third (and final) day of the show. For Christmas that same year, Warp sent out D2 brand packets of curry emblazoned with the images of Kenji Eno and Laura to select journalists.

Though at the time it was believed that D2 was nearly complete when Panasonic officially announced that the M2 was not going to be released, Eno later revealed the game was "about 50 percent finished". Following the abandonment of the M2, Warp began work on porting the game to the Sega Saturn. However, eventually Kenji Eno decided to abandon the original concept and create an entirely new game for the Dreamcast. At the March 1998 Tokyo Game Show, Warp passed out a flyer announcing that on May 23 D2 would be unveiled for a new platform. Though the flyer did not specify what the platform was, Warp's public relationship with Sega immediately led to speculation that D2 was being developed for the Dreamcast.

In Japan, a demonstration version of D2 was packaged with another Warp-produced game, the Dreamcast remake of the Sega Saturn title Real Sound: Kaze no Regret. This early preview of the game, known as D2 Shock Demo, features modified opening credits and a "heads up display" compared to the completed game. Additionally, it contains a save file that copies to the Dreamcast VMU and unlocks a "secret movie" in the retail Japanese version of D2. This movie is a preview of the shelved M2 version of D2. It was removed from the North American version but can briefly be seen as an in-flight movie during the hijacking sequence.

A playable animation demo of the M2 version of D2 was found and coded to run on M2 kiosk hardware in December 2019. It features the main character of the M2 version, Taren, executing the backflip sword slash seen in the alpha version of D2 previews from 1997.

== Release ==
The game was released in Japan as one standard edition and three limited edition variants. The standard edition features Laura on the cover, while the limited edition covers are white, silver or black, respectively, for the Hope, Bliss, and Eclipse variants. The limited editions also included a calendar of the year 2000. It was jewel-case sized and printed on a single page of translucent plastic, colored either yellow, red, blue, or green.

== Reception ==
Reception

Aggregate score
Aggregator	Score
Metacritic	69/100

Review scores
Publication	Score
AllGame	2.5/5
CNET Gamecenter	8/10
Electronic Gaming Monthly	5.5/10; 7/10; 6.5/10 (Note: Three critics of Electronic Gaming Monthly gave their own scores to the game.)
Famitsu	9/10, 7/10, 8/10, 8/10
Game Informer	4.75/10
GameFan	78%
GamePro	3.5/5
GameSpot	6.2/10
GameSpy	4.5/10
IGN	6.2/10
Jeuxvideo.com	15/20
Next Generation	3/5

D2 received "mixed or average" reviews according to the review aggregation website Metacritic.

D2 aroused conflicting reactions in reviewers. They lauded the graphics, music, and deep storytelling. However, they criticized the actual gameplay for being repetitive, dull and buried with cutscenes. Jeff Lundrigan of NextGen said of the game, "If you've got a lot of patience, it's well worth your time, but D2 desperately needs a better sense of pace." In Japan, Famitsu gave it a score of 32 out of 40.
