= From Yellow to Orange =

Japanese video game company

From Yellow to Orange Co., Ltd.
- Native name: 株式会社フロムイエロートゥオレンジ
- Romanized name: Kabushiki-gaisha furomuierōtouorenji
- Formerly: Warp Inc. (1994–2000); Super Warp (2000–2001)
- Type: Private
- Industry: Music; Video games (formerly)
- Founded: March 1, 1994; 32 years ago
- Founder: Kenji Eno
- Headquarters: Nishi-Shinjuku, Shinjuku, Tokyo, Japan
- Products: D (video game); Enemy Zero; D2 (video game)
- Website: fyto.com

From Yellow to Orange Co., Ltd. is a Japanese music publisher and former video game developer. Originally founded in 1994 as Warp Inc. by musician and designer Kenji Eno, the company is best known for its interactive movies, such as D and Enemy Zero, which often featured music composed by Eno himself. Following the release of D2, the company briefly rebranded as Super Warp, before settling on its current name in 2001. Kenji Eno headed the company until his death on February 20, 2013.

== History ==
The company was founded as Warp Inc., and briefly rebranded as Super Warp in 2000

Warp was founded by Kenji Eno on March 1, 1994. Its original logo–four television screens displaying the four letters of the company's name–was created by Eno and designer Tomohiro Miyazaki. The company began by developing games for the 3DO, due to the platform's low licensing fees. In 1995, Warp released D, an interactive movie that would go on to become a success in Japan and a cult hit internationally. Following a dispute with Sony over the amount of copies printed for the game's PlayStation version, Kenji Eno announced that Warp's future titles would be developed exclusively for Sega platforms. In 2000, after the release of D2, the company changed its name to Super Warp and exited the video game industry, widening its scope to network services, DVD products, and online music.

Following an investment by Neoteny Inc., the company changed its name once again to From Yellow to Orange (commonly abbreviated as Fyto) in 2001. Fyto released the game You, Me, and the Cubes in 2009. Eno headed the company as president and chief executive officer (CEO) until his death in February 2013. Katsutoshi Eguchi subsequently became the company's CEO. Eno's final project, Kakexun, became a collaborative effort between Fyto and Naoya Sato's company Warp2. Since 2015, no updates have been given on the state of the project.

After a period of dormancy, Yuka Eno was appointed as the company's CEO in 2022, and subsequently, Fyto started digitally distributing music. On the tenth anniversary of Kenji Eno's passing, the soundtracks of several Warp-era games were re-released, and a documentary by Archipel was screened in Tokyo, before being released online. In 2024, the company released an audiobook version of Real Sound: Kaze no Regret to commemorate the game's 27th anniversary.

As of an unspecified date, Sega owns the rights to Warp's game catalogue.

== Games developed ==
Year	Title	Publisher	Platform
1994	Trip'd	San-Ei Shobo Publishing (Japan); Panasonic (USA)	3DO
1994	Totsugeki Kikan Megadasu!!	San-Ei Shobo Publishing	3DO
1995	Uchuu Seibutsu Flopon-kun P!	Asmik Corporation	PlayStation
1995	D	San-Ei Shobo Publishing (3DO / Japan); Panasonic (3DO / USA); Acclaim Entertainment (DOS, PC, PS1, SS)	3DO, Sega Saturn, PlayStation, MS-DOS
1995	Oyaji Hunter Mahjong	Warp	3DO
1995	Flopon World	Warp	3DO
1996	D: Director's Cut	Warp	3DO
1996	Short Warp	Warp	3DO
1996	Enemy Zero	Warp (Japan); Sega (USA)	Sega Saturn, Microsoft Windows
1997	Real Sound: Kaze no Regret	Warp	Sega Saturn, Dreamcast
1999	D2	Sega	Dreamcast

As From Yellow to Orange Inc.

Year	Title	Publisher	Platform
2009	You, Me, and the Cubes (Note: Co-developed with T&E Soft)	Nintendo	Wii (WiiWare)
