= D (video game) =

1995 video game

- North American 3DO cover art
- Developer: Warp (Note: Ported to MS-DOS by Rozner Labs)
- Publishers: JP: San-Ei Shobo Publishing (3DO); NA: Panasonic (3DO); WW: Acclaim Entertainment (SAT, PS1, MS-DOS)
- Director: Kenji Eno
- Programmer: Hirofumi Hayashida
- Artist: Shosaburou Tateishi
- Writer: Kenji Eno
- Platforms: 3DO, Sega Saturn, PlayStation, MS-DOS
- Release: April 1, 1995: 3DO; JP: April 1, 1995; NA: 1995 Director's Cut; JP: January 1996 Saturn; JP: July 28, 1995; NA: March 5, 1996; EU: March 8, 1996 PlayStation; JP: December 1, 1995; NA: March 5, 1996; EU: March 8, 1996 MS-DOS; NA: March 5, 1996; EU: March 8, 1996
- Genres: Interactive movie, adventure
- Mode: Single-player

D (Note: Known in Japan as D no Shokutaku (Japanese: Dの食卓; lit. "D's Dining Table") or D's Diner.) is a 1995 horror-themed interactive movie and adventure game developed by Warp and directed by Kenji Eno. The game was first released for the 3DO, and was later ported to the Sega Saturn, PlayStation, and MS-DOS. The story follows Laura Harris as she goes to investigate a hospital after learning her father went on a mass murdering spree and barricaded himself inside. The hospital morphs into a castle upon her arrival, which she must explore to find her father. The player controls Laura through computer generated full-motion video (FMV) sequences, and must complete the game within two hours without a save or pause function.

Development lasted about one year and was primarily done with Amiga 4000 computers to create the FMVs. It would be the first major release for the still-unknown Eno and Warp, and so Eno felt that if it were not successful he would retire from game development. He added scenes of violence and cannibalism to make the game more striking, however he believed the content would be too extreme for censors or publishers and feared the game would not be permitted for publishing. To ensure these scenes would not be censored, Eno submitted a "clean" version for late publisher approval, knowing they would require him to deliver the game to the manufacturer. On his way to the manufacturer, he switched the clean version with his master version containing the more disturbing content.

The game was a commercial and critical success in Japan, selling a million copies and receiving a special edition re-release. Critics in the West praised D's horror elements, story, graphics, and presentation. Reviewers of the 3DO version found it to be one of the best games on the platform. For the PlayStation release, Sony did not print enough copies to match pre-orders. Eno was very upset with this, and would release his later games exclusively on Sega platforms. Warp dubbed the CG model for Laura Harris a "digital actress" and had "her" play different characters in two later games, Enemy Zero (1996) and D2 (1999), the stories for which are unrelated to D. Modern retrospectives find D less appealing, but still commend it for its place in history as a unique blend of cinema and gaming and an early example of mature horror game design.

== Gameplay ==
Laura finding an item for a puzzle

D is an interactive movie which features adventure game elements, a horror genre storyline, and heavy use of full motion video. The player takes on the role of Laura Harris, played by a "digital actress" named Laura that appears in games by Warp, although the stories are unrelated. The player directs Laura's movements as she explores the game's environment, solves puzzles, and unravels the story. The movements occur through FMV sequences as she walks to the desired location, from where the player is greeted with a static screen which may contain items they can interact with or other paths to direct Laura. There is no save or pause function, and after two real-time hours, the other world will be closed off and Laura will be pulled back to the real world, ending the game. Depending on the player's actions, there are different endings.

== Plot ==
Taking place in 1997, the story begins when Laura Harris is contacted by Los Angeles police, receiving a disturbing message: her father, Dr. Richter Harris, director of the Los Angeles National Hospital, has gone on a mass murdering spree and barricaded himself in the hospital. Laura rushes to the scene of the crime, desperate to find an explanation for the well-respected doctor's actions. Upon entering the hospital, she is so horrified at the murdered bodies lying about the halls that she covers her eyes. When she uncovers them again, she finds herself in an unknown medieval castle. (Note: This only occurs in the 3DO version. In later versions of the game, she is still in the hospital and explores further, until taken by a small metallic liquid-like entity to the castle.) Unwilling to give up her search, Laura continues through the dark corridors of the castle. While attempting to find her father, she experiences a series of flashbacks of her mother being stabbed to death. Laura's father (taking the form of apparitions) warns her to leave, saying that staying too long means being stuck in the alternate reality forever. He warns that he will soon become an emotionless monster and will eventually try to kill her. Still shaken, Laura proceeds to find her father.

Ultimately, Laura finds her father residing at the peak tower of the castle. He reveals the sordid past of his family: Laura and her father are part of a bloodline of cannibalistic vampires, dating back to the infamous Dracula. Driven by her vampiric urges, Laura killed and ate her mother years ago, but it was erased from her memory by her father. As Dr. Harris demands Laura to leave one last time, he begins to transform into a vampire. If the player approaches Dr. Harris at this point, he will consume Laura's flesh and fully transform. However, if the player shoots Dr. Harris with a revolver that can be found earlier in the game, the bullet will kill him and stop his transformation. As Laura tearfully cradles her dying father in her arms, he confesses that he allowed the transformation to occur out of scientific curiosity and thanks her for stopping him. With his death, the realm created by his mind fades and is replaced by the normal surroundings of the hospital.

== Development and release ==
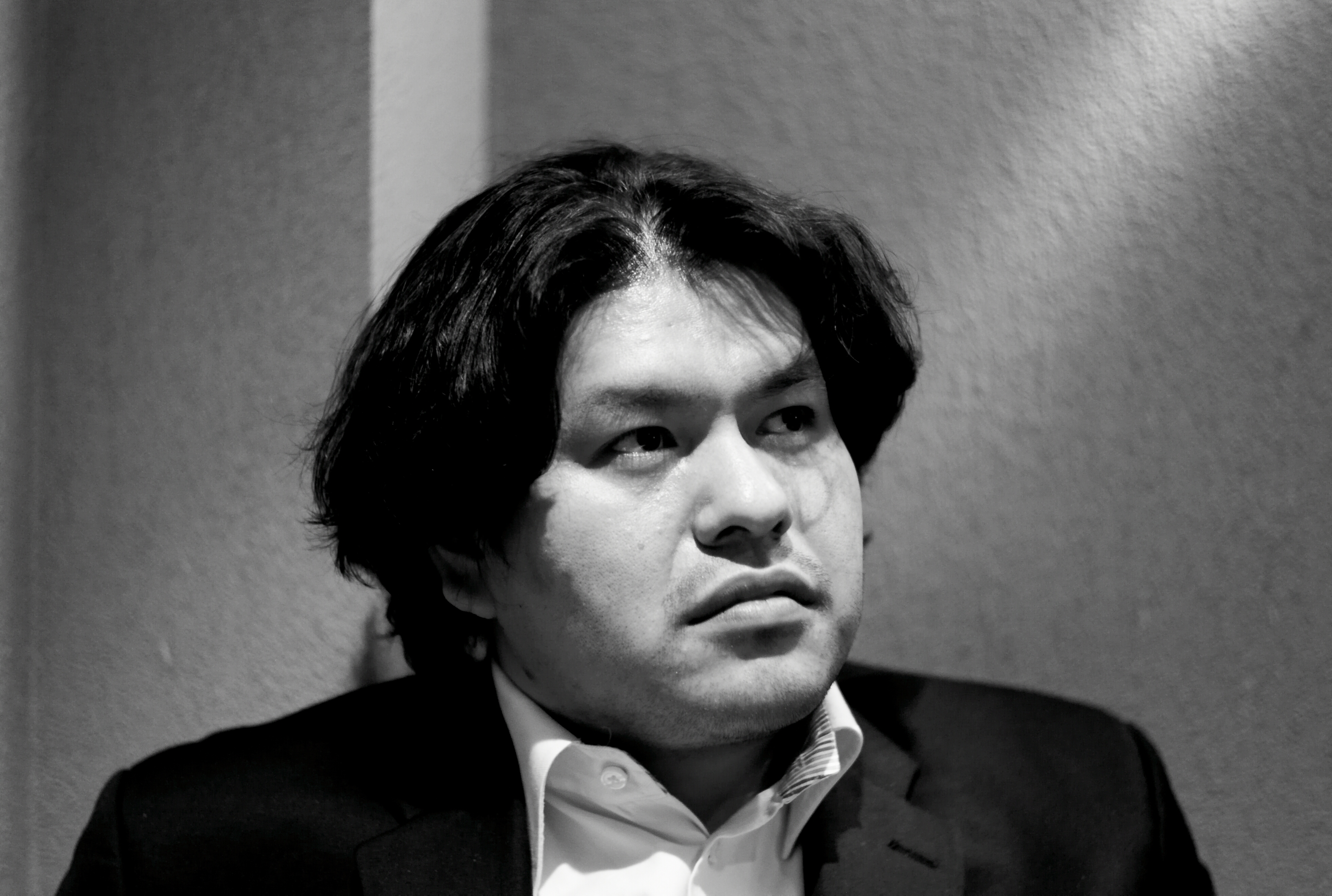
Kenji Eno, president of Warp and lead director of D, in 2007

Development of D lasted about one year and was directed by Warp president Kenji Eno. Eno was heavily inspired by Polarware's Transylvania adventure game series and he believes D would have never been created if it were not for playing those games. Eno and Warp were still relatively unknown in the industry, and D would be their first major title. With this in mind, Eno felt that he was gambling his development career on D, and if it were not successful he would stop developing games. There were three phases to D's development: the adventure game structure, the story creation, and finally violence was added. Since the adventure gameplay was largely finished before the story began to take fruition, flashbacks were added to detail the plot. The plot was largely based on that of Dracula, but Eno found it too boring, and so added violence and cannibalism to make the game more striking. The FMVs were created using Amiga 4000s.

Eno believed D's violent cannibalistic themes would be deemed taboo or too horrifying by others and was worried the game would not be permitted for publishing. With this in mind, Eno kept many of the violent sequences a secret, including from other members of Warp. When the game was finished, he submitted a "clean" version (i.e. without the violent and disturbing story content) for approval. He deliberately submitted the master late, knowing that part of the penalty would require him to hand-deliver it to the manufacturers in the United States. While on the plane ride to the US, he switched the "clean" discs with the finalized discs including the horrific content, thus completely bypassing all censorship.

D was released in Japan for the 3DO on April 1, 1995. D was a success in Japan. In total it sold one million copies there and the Saturn version reached the top of the sales charts in its first week. It had sold 450,000 copies in Japan by August 1996. It was one of the few genuine hits for the 3DO in Japan, and drew a significant cult following of hardcore fans even before being ported to other systems. A Japanese re-release for the 3DO titled D's Diner: Director's Cut contained additional content and a bonus soundtrack disc. The PlayStation release of D was set to be published by Acclaim and manufactured by Sony. Orders for around 100,000 units had already been made before Sony decided to give their other titles manufacturing priority. Sony told Eno they had only manufactured 40,000 units, which made Eno very upset, but ultimately, Sony had only manufactured 28,000 units. This shortage upset Eno so much that he later announced, at a Sony event, that he would release his next games for the Sega Saturn. Warp's later games, including Enemy Zero (1996) and D2 (1999), were released exclusively on Sega platforms.

== Reception ==
Reception

Review scores
Publication	Score
AllGame	2.5/5 (3DO); 2.5/5 (SAT)
Computer and Video Games	78% (SAT)
Electronic Gaming Monthly	8.5/10, 8.5/10, 7/10, 8/10 (SAT)
Famitsu	8/10, 9/10, 8/10, 7/10 (SAT); 8/10, 10/10, 8/10, 7/10 (PS)
Game Informer	6/10 (SAT)
GameFan	80/100, 92/100, 90/100 (3DO); 275/300 (3DO)
GameRevolution	C (SAT)
GamesMaster	85% (SAT)
Next Generation	3/5 (3DO, SAT, PS)
PC PowerPlay	8/10 (MS-DOS)
Play	69% (PS)
Dengeki PlayStation	80/100, 75/100, 70/100, 80/100 (PS)
Maximum	3/5 (SAT, PS)
Sega Saturn Magazine	83% (SAT)

Awards
Publication	Award
GameFan's 4th Annual Megawards	3DO Game of the Year, Best 3DO Graphic Adventure/FMV Game
GamePro Editors' Choice Awards 1995	Third Best 3DO Game

The original 3DO release of D was well received. In their import review, GameFan staff stated they normally disliked interactive movie FMV games, but praised D for being innovative and creative, dubbing it "a masterpiece." In their review of the English release, they commended its horror elements and concluded it to be "the best FMV game likely ever to be made" and the best 3DO title at the time. GamePro staff gave the game high scores for its presentation and likewise commended its scare factor. They called it "a frightening work of art" but cautioned that it was not for everyone. Next Generation reviewed the 3DO version first as an import, rating it two stars out of five, and stated that "This is without a doubt the most heavily atmospheric and creepy title to date for the 3DO - or for that matter, any home system." Their review of the domestic release said the graphics were astounding and enhanced the player's involvement in the creepy storyline. The reviewer criticized the English localization's dialogue and voice acting, and said the game suffers from low challenge and extremely short length, but still found the game enjoyable.

Reviews for the Saturn and PlayStation ports were mostly positive although some were mixed. Sam Hickman from Sega Saturn Magazine commented that the game manages to be extremely creepy and terrifying despite having almost no bloodshed. He predicted that the game would be outclassed by Resident Evil (still in development at the time of the review), but concluded that D was the best horror game presently on the market. Four reviewers at Electronic Gaming Monthly commented that the Saturn version had reduced the load times seen in the 3DO version to almost nothing. They highly praised the storyline and intelligently designed puzzles, and described it as "scary enough to make you an insomniac." GamePro staff gave positive reviews for both the Saturn and PlayStation versions, recommending it to those looking for a horror experience. Maximum staff likewise gave positive reviews to both versions, saying that D is similar to Myst (1993) and Mansion of Hidden Souls (1993) but ultimately better due to its more enticing story. They also praised the FMV graphics and cinematic presentation, but criticized it for its lack of longevity. The reviewers felt its short length, addictive gameplay, and lack of overly challenging puzzles ensured that the player will be finished with it very quickly. A Next Generation reviewer gave the same praises for the scary storyline and graphics, and also said the puzzles "are just challenging enough to satisfy and yet not so difficult as to impede your progress for very long." However, he felt the slow character movement and lack of longevity kept the game from being truly exceptional. Staff at Game Informer were more critical in their review of the Saturn version. They found the gameplay tedious but did praise the graphics and the storytelling, concluding the "story would make a great movie or book, but not a game."

=== Accolades ===
GameFan staff named D their 1995 3DO Game of the Year and the Best 3DO Graphic Adventure/FMV Game. GamePro staff ranked it the third best 3DO game for their 1995 Editors' Choice Awards. In 1996, GamesMaster ranked the Sega Saturn version 7th on their "The GamesMaster Saturn Top 10." It won the Japanese Trade Minister's award in 1995 or 1996.

== Legacy ==
Modern retrospectives find D less appealing by contemporary standards, but have acknowledged its cult following and unique place in video game history. John Szczepaniak of Hardcore Gaming 101 could not find a reason to recommend D over other adventure games released prior or after, outside of the cannibalistic themes. He still recommended those interested to watch a walkthrough on YouTube. Alex Wawro of Gamasutra believed that D is worth studying as an early example of horror game design. Brittany Vincent of Rock, Paper, Shotgun called it a "quintessential example" of a period when developers were attempting to blend FMV techniques with traditional game design to build something coherent. She called it a "surrealistic" phase in video game development when it seemed that the worlds of cinema and games were colliding. Staff at Core Gamers called D a benchmark for horror adventure games and one of the first console games with a mature-themed atmosphere. In an article titled "The aging horror of Kenji Eno's D", Richard Mitchell of Engadget shared the same sentiments as others. He commended D for ushering in the era of survival horror by paving a path for games like Resident Evil, and said that without historical context, it's difficult to enjoy D in modern times. In 2008, Game Informer listed it among the worst horror games of all time. In 2016, Nightdive Studios, a company known for reviving neglected classics, re-released the MS-DOS port of D on Steam and GOG.
