= Superman (1992 video game) =

- North American Genesis box art
- Developer: Thinking Rabbit (Note: Game Gear and Master System versions by Graftgold.)
- Publishers: NA: Sunsoft; EU: Virgin Games
- Directors: Masahiro Kataoka, Akito Takeuchi
- Producers: Kiharu Yoshida; Ian Mathias (GG, MS)
- Designers: Michael Mandheim; Steve Turner, Rod Mack (GG, MS)
- Programmers: Sakura Hasegawa, Ann Bob Winza; Steve Turner, Rod Mack (GG, MS)
- Artists: Minori Okamoto, Naomi Sanada, Takakiyo Masaki, Hiroyuki Karashima, Toyozumi Sakai, Dai Ozawa, Yukio Obayashi; John Lilley (GG, MS)
- Composers: Kenji Yamazaki, Junichi Ueda, Hiroshi Tsukamoto; Jason Page (GG, MS)
- Platforms: Sega Mega Drive/Genesis, Game Gear, Master System
- Release: NA: December 1992; EU: June 1993
- Genre: Action
- Mode: Single-player

Superman (known in Europe as Superman: The Man of Steel) is a video game released by Sunsoft for the Mega Drive/Genesis in 1992. It is based on the DC Comics character of the same name. It is a traditional single-player side-scrolling arcade game where the player controls Superman through various levels in an effort to defeat the evil supervillain named Brainiac. Other super villains, as bosses, include The Prankster, Metallo and Mister Mxyzptlk.

This game was planned to be released on the Super Nintendo Entertainment System, but was cancelled before it was completed. Versions of the game for the Master System and Game Gear were developed by Graftgold and published by Virgin Games in Europe as Superman: The Man of Steel, which was also the title received by the European Mega Drive version published by Virgin.

== Gameplay and plot ==
Superman must confront some generic bad guys before being able to confront the end-level boss.

Each level of the game begins with a front page of the Daily Planet announcing that some supervillain is wreaking havoc on the city, and with Clark Kent changing into his Superman costume in order to start the level.

The game limits the powers of Superman to jumping, punching and kicking (he cannot fly except in cutscenes). He can only use his superpowers by collecting certain icons scattered throughout the level that are required to accomplish a certain task, e.g., a superpunch icon to break down a wall in order to further advance in the level. At the end of each level, Superman battles a super villain from the comics, and the intermission between each level is a congratulatory message from the Daily Planet newspaper.

The final level involves Superman flying up into Brainiac's space station for a repeat battle with the previous super villain bosses and then a final battle with Brainiac.

== Reception ==
The game received from generally mixed to negative review. While the game was noted for its decent 16-bit graphics and sound, critics panned the game for its limited usage of Superman's powers and for having a limited storyline. As the player could only have one super power icon at a time, a glitch in the pre-production editions of the game (fixed before its release but still a problem in the edition that was reviewed by many video game critics) forced the player to reset the game if they collected the wrong icon.

== See also ==
- Sunman (video game), an unreleased NES game originally developed as a Superman game
