= Casino Kid =

1989 video game

- North American cover art
- Developer: SOFEL
- Publisher: SOFEL
- Artist: Tadao Nomura
- Composer: Toshio Murai
- Platform: NES
- Release: JP: January 6, 1989; NA: October 1989
- Genre: Casino
- Mode: Single-player

Casino Kid is a casino video game developed and published by SOFEL for the Nintendo Entertainment System in 1989. In Japan, the game was released as $1,000,000 Kid: Maboroshi no Teiou Hen (100万＄キッド 幻の帝王編) and is based on the manga series $1,000,000 Kid by Yuki Ishigaki.

== Gameplay ==
Casino Kid takes place two years in the future at the time of release in a fictional Las Vegas (the Japanese version uses the actual city of Las Vegas, Nevada) where the object is to earn much money and to defeat the evil King of the Casino. Games at the casino include blackjack and five-card draw poker. Slot machines and roulette were omitted from the North American version. While the North American version uses a parody name for the Las Vegas casino, the Japanese version uses the actual Golden Nugget name.

In the Japanese version, it is possible to travel to other casinos like New York City and Japan for a substantial airfare cost. Players can essentially customize the game in the Japanese version by placing in their own name. Casino Kid has blue hair in the Japanese version and blond hair in the North American version. A "free mode" is added into the Japanese version that allow for experimentation with gambling strategies.

There is a different introduction in the North American and Japanese version. The Japanese version has a kid imagining himself to be the casino champion while the North American version has the player compete in a tournament for the world's toughest gamblers. Both versions have waitresses in bunny costumes that give hints to the player. Attempting to skip an opponent allows players to find the exact location of the previous opponent while skipping two or more opponents is frowned upon in this game.

== Legacy ==
Casino Kid 2

Casino Kid II is the sequel to Casino Kid, released in North America in April 1993 by the same company. The sequel was originally going to be titled The Prince of Othello and given a 1990 release until Sofel decided to temporarily cancel the project.

In Casino Kid II, the titular protagonist, after having defeated the top players in Las Vegas, is issued a challenge by the top gamblers around the world. The matches are organized by a mysterious leader and, to unveil the leader, the Casino Kid must defeat nine opponents from around the world in the games of roulette, poker, and blackjack. There is a story sequence that is more elaborate than in Casino Kid. Gameplay in Casino Kid II differs, in that players no longer venture around the casino looking for rival gamblers, though the card games still operate in the same fashion as in the original Casino Kid. Players travel by plane to each destination either in the daytime or at night, depending on the country to which he is flying.

Unlike Casino Kid, Casino Kid II was never released in Japan. The game is probably most well-known for its music done by the EIM sound team of Kenji Eno and Michiya Hirasawa (both now deceased).
