= Parallel World (1990 video game) =

- Cover art
- Developer: EIM
- Publisher: Varie
- Composer: Hirohiko Takayama
- Platform: Family Computer
- Release: JP: August 10, 1990
- Genre: Real-time puzzle
- Mode: Single-player

Parallel World (ぱられるワールド) is a puzzle video game developed by EIM and published by Varie. It was released in Japan for the Family Computer on August 10, 1990.

== Summary ==
The player and his girlfriend must find their way back home after being sucked into an alternate universe.

A magnificent castle full of 25 different game worlds block their progress, however, and they are filled with enemies on every stage. The player has an overhead view to destroy the enemies for extra loot. Given a strict time limit of 100 seconds to solve each puzzle, the game rewards fast puzzle solvers. The first player controls the male while the second player controls the female. Players only start with three lives and lose them when time runs out or when a monster comes into contact with him/her.

Enemies in the game include springs, rollers, witches, and zombies.
