= List of Mass Effect 3 downloadable content =

Mass Effect 3 is an action role-playing video game developed by BioWare and published by Electronic Arts. It was released for Microsoft Windows, PlayStation 3 and Xbox 360 on March 6, 2012, and for Wii U on November 18, 2012. The game features a variety of downloadable content packs that were released from March 2012 to April 2013 on Xbox Live, PlayStation Network, and BioWare's Social Network. The Wii U version of the game does not support downloadable content but includes several packs. The content listed as promotional content was only available to the Microsoft Windows, PlayStation 3 and Xbox 360 versions of the game through limited promotional opportunities. Following the game's release on Steam, Mass Effect 3's DLC was collected into a single pack titled Mass Effect 3 DLC Bundle, and sold for the same price as the game itself. In 2021, all of the Mass Effect 3 downloadable content was remastered as part of the Mass Effect Legendary Edition.

== Single-player content ==
=== General content ===
Content	Release date	Wii U
From Ashes	March 6, 2012	Yes
Included in the Mass Effect 3 N7 Digital Deluxe Edition and the Mass Effect 3 N7 Collector's Edition.; Adds two missions, a squad member, an assault rifle, and other items.; Concerns the recovery of an ancient artifact of Prothean origin.
Extended Cut	June 26, 2012 (July 4, 2012 for PlayStation 3 in Europe)	Yes
Adds new cinematics and epilogue scenes that expand upon the game's original ending.
Firefight Pack	August 7, 2012	Yes
Adds a sniper rifle, a shotgun, two assault rifles, two submachine guns, and the sniper rifle from the M-90 Indra promotional content pack.
Leviathan	August 28, 2012 (August 29, 2012 for PlayStation 3 in Europe)	No
Adds numerous missions, the assault rifle from the M-55 Argus promotional content pack, the shotgun from the AT-12 Raider promotional content pack, and other items.; Concerns the chase of clues to the existence of a mythical Reaper-killing creature.
Groundside Resistance Pack	October 16, 2012	No
Adds two assault rifles, two shotguns, two heavy pistols, and a sniper rifle.
Alternate Appearance Pack 1	November 20, 2012	No
Adds an armor set and three squad member outfits.
Omega	November 27, 2012 (November 28, 2012 for PlayStation 3 in Europe)	No
Adds five missions, the N7 Valkyrie assault rifle from the N7 Warfare Gear promotional content pack, the assault rifle from the Chakram Launcher promotional content pack, and other items.; Concerns Shepard aiding gangster Aria T'Loak in retaking a black market station from enemy forces.
Citadel	March 5, 2013 (March 6, 2013 for PlayStation 3 in Europe)	No
Adds numerous missions, several gambling and arcade mini-games, a series of battle arena challenges, three armor sets, an assault rifle, a heavy pistol, and other items.; Shepard rallies their crew to help them investigate an attempted identity theft and prevent the hijacking of the Normandy, however the DLC is primarily concerned with allowing Shepard (and the player) to experience additional character interactions with crewmates and friends from the series.
Mass Effect: Genesis 2	April 2, 2013	Yes
Adds an interactive comic that allows the player to impact the story of Mass Effect 3 with several major plot decisions of the original Mass Effect and Mass Effect 2. This is primarily for players that have not played the earlier games, and want to catchup on the storyline as well as unique player decisions.

=== Promotional content ===
Content

AT-12 Raider
- Pre-order bonus from Origin (PC-only).
- Included in the Leviathan general content pack.
- Adds a shotgun.
M-55 Argus
- Pre-order bonus from any retailer.
- Included in the Leviathan general content pack and the N7 Warfare Gear promotional content pack.
- Adds an assault rifle.
M-90 Indra
- Limited code giveaway from Alienware (PC-only).
- Included in the Firefight Pack general content pack.
- Adds a sniper rifle.
Chakram Launcher
- Acquired by completing the demo for Kingdoms of Amalur: Reckoning.
- Included in the Omega general content pack.
- Adds an assault rifle.
Reckoner Knight Armor
- Acquired by completing the demo for Kingdoms of Amalur: Reckoning.
- Adds an armor set.
N7 Warfare Gear
- Pre-order bonus from GameStop.
- Adds an armor set, an assault rifle called N7 Valkyrie, and the assault rifle from the M-55 Argus promotional content pack.
- The N7 Valkyrie assault rifle is included in the Omega general content pack.
N7 Collector's Edition Pack
- Exclusive to players who purchased the Mass Effect 3 N7 Digital Deluxe Edition or the Mass Effect 3 N7 Collector's Edition.
- Adds a submachine gun, a shotgun, a sniper rifle, a heavy pistol, and other items.

== Multiplayer content ==
=== General content ===
Content	Release date	Wii U
Online Pass	March 6, 2012	N/A
Activates the multiplayer mode for PlayStation 3 or Xbox 360.
Resurgence Pack	April 10, 2012 (April 11, 2012 for PlayStation 3 in Europe)	Yes
Adds two maps, six characters, an assault rifle, a sniper rifle, a submachine gun, and other items.
Rebellion Pack	May 29, 2012 (May 30, 2012 for PlayStation 3 in Europe)	Yes
Adds two maps, six characters, a match objective, a gear slot, an assault rifle, a sniper rifle, and a shotgun.
Earth	July 17, 2012 (July 18, 2012 for PlayStation 3 in Europe)	Yes
Adds three maps, six characters, a difficulty setting, a match objective, an assault rifle, a heavy pistol, a shotgun, and other items.
Retaliation	October 9, 2012 (October 10, 2012 for PlayStation 3 in Europe)	No
Adds numerous characters released over time, an enemy faction, six variants of pre-existing maps, a challenges system, a sniper rifle, a submachine gun, the assault rifle from the Collector Assault Rifle promotional content pack, and other items.
Reckoning	February 26, 2013 (February 27, 2013 for PlayStation 3 in Europe)	No
Adds six characters, three assault rifles, two heavy pistols, a shotgun, a submachine gun, and other items.

=== Promotional content ===
Content

Collector Assault Rifle
- Acquired by pre-ordering a copy of The Art of the Mass Effect Universe from Barnes & Noble, or by purchasing the digital version of The Art of the Mass Effect Universe or the entire Mass Effect: Invasion series through Dark Horse digital store.
- Included in the Retaliation general content pack.
- Adds an assault rifle.
Battlefield 3 Pack
- Acquired by signing into the multiplayer using an Origin account linked to a Battlefield 3 Online Pass.
- Adds multiplayer items.
Premium Collectible Pack
- Acquired by purchasing Mass Effect action figure packs.
- Adds multiplayer items.
Recruitment Reward Pack
- Acquired through the Mass Effect 3 Recruitment Program application on Facebook.
- Adds multiplayer items.
