= Superman Activity Center =

- Developer: Gryphon Software
- Publisher: Knowledge Adventure
- Platforms: Windows; Macintosh
- Release: November 19, 1997
- Genre: Educational

Superman Activity Center is a 1997 video game developed by Gryphon Software and published by Knowledge Adventure. It is based on the 1996 animated series Superman: The Animated Series.

== Gameplay ==
The player progresses through three areas, Krypton, Smallville, and Metropolis, completing every activity in each area to unlock the next. Activities include repeating musical note sequences from memory, programming a mechanical arm to collect rocket parts, coloring scenes, finding household hazards with X-ray vision, predicting an escaping villain's movements to trap them, competing against Lex Luthor in a board game, identifying constellations, navigating mazes, reconstructing scrambled words, writing and laying out newspaper stories, and creating printable newspaper pages. Most activities feature three difficulty levels, and progression requires successfully completing the challenges within each area.

== Development ==
Superman Activity Center was developed by Gryphon Software, a company founded in 1991. It was released on November 19, 1997.

== Reception ==
Reception

Review scores
Publication	Score
All Game Guide	3.5/5
Hacker	45%

Kids Domain liked the variety in Superman Activity Center. The Daily Times found Superman Activity Center to be slightly challenging for younger users. The Canadian Toy Testing Council gave Superman Activity Center three stars on a scale of three stars, two stars, one star, novelty, not recommended.
