= Enemy Zero =

1996 video game

- European Sega Saturn cover art
- Developer: Warp (Note: Ported to Windows by Sega.)
- Publishers: JP: Warp; WW: Sega
- Director: Kenji Eno
- Programmers: Hideki Miura; Naoya Sato
- Artists: Shosaburou Tateishi; Yasushi Nirasawa
- Writer: Yuji Sakamoto
- Composer: Michael Nyman
- Platforms: Sega Saturn, Windows
- Release: Saturn: JP: December 13, 1996; NA: December 1, 1997; EU: December 5, 1997; Windows: EU: September 18, 1998; NA: November 5, 1998; JP: November 28, 1998
- Genres: Adventure, interactive movie
- Mode: Single player

Enemy Zero (Note: Japanese: エネミー・ゼロ, Hepburn: Enemī Zero) is a 1996 horror-themed adventure video game for the Sega Saturn, developed by Warp and directed by Kenji Eno. Players assume the role of an astronaut who awakens from cryogenic sleep to find her spaceship overrun by invisible creatures who are hunting and killing the ship's crew. They must navigate through the ship in a combination of puzzle-driven exploration rendered in full motion video and first-person shooter sections rendered in real time, during which they must rely on sound to either avoid or kill the invisible enemies.

Enemy Zero was initially designed for Sony's PlayStation, but due to grievances with Sony, Eno announced the game would be Saturn exclusive in a dramatic press conference stunt. As support for the Saturn outside of Japan was waning at the time, finding overseas publishers for the game became an uncertain struggle, with Sega itself ultimately taking on publication of the game in both North America and Europe. Upon release the game met with a wide spectrum of responses from critics, with some finding the game slow-paced and frustratingly difficult, while others praised its innovative emphasis on sound and the unique tension resulting from the gameplay design and setting.

Despite the divisive critical response and the exclusivity to a declining platform, Enemy Zero was a modest commercial success. After its Saturn release, it was ported to Microsoft Windows. It was the second game to star the "digital actress" Laura, the first being D. Laura is voiced by Jill Cunniff of the band Luscious Jackson in the English versions and Yui Komazuka in the Japanese version.

== Gameplay ==
Laura acquiring a gun during an FMV sequence

In Enemy Zero, gameplay sequences alternate between interactive full motion video (FMV) and real time exploration, both from a first person perspective. The interactive FMV component uses gameplay identical to an earlier Warp game, D. The player explores node-based environments, acquiring items for their inventory and solving puzzles.

The real time component of Enemy Zero is unique. Enemies are invisible, and location is only possible through the use of sound, with notes of different pitch helping the player find the distance and direction of enemies. Additionally, every gun in the game must be charged up immediately before each shot, and charging a shot for too long will cause the charge to dissipate, after which the charging must start over. Since all available guns have very limited range, this makes timing crucial; beginning to charge the gun too late or too soon will allow the enemy to reach Laura, resulting in an immediate game over. Reloading the gun and moving the character around are mechanics that have been made intentionally slow, which incentives players to avoid combat and direct contact with the alien enemies as much as possible. In the early segments of the game, avoiding detection is not only recommended; it is required, since the player has no means to defend themselves without a gun.

== Plot ==
Aboard the AKI space craft, a space station dedicated to biological research, Laura Lewis is in a deep cryogenic slumber. The jets of the chamber dissipate as the craft's emergency systems are activated. Laura is awakened by a large detonation on her deck. Outside a door marked with the letters E0, something of great strength is trying to break free. The door is thrown down, and the hallway is filled with a bright, incandescent light, followed by a horrific growl. Pipes and the remains of the steel door shift around, as if being stepped on. Laura, unaware of what is happening, uses the video phone above her sleep chamber to contact one of her crewmates, Parker. Laura watches in confusion as Parker looks away from the monitor, to his room's entryway doors. A screech sends him backing up to reach for his gun. Laura watches as Parker is mutilated by an unseen enemy.

Getting dressed and grabbing her gun, Laura heads out to learn what attacked Parker. As she ventures through the ship, Laura's earring-shaped "guidance system" gives her aural warnings of invisible enemies (seen escaping in the intro sequence) roaming the ship's corridors. She discovers that even the ship's captain Ronny (voiced by Tesshō Genda, credited as Genda Tetsusho, in the Japanese) has also been killed by the creatures as well. Laura eventually meets up with Kimberley (voiced by Naoko Kouda in the Japanese), another crewmate, and they make a plan to rendezvous with the other survivors. On their way Kimberley is attacked by an enemy and disappears, forcing Laura to make the journey on her own. She meets up with George (voiced by Hōchū Ōtsuka, credited as Yoshitada Ōtsuka, in the Japanese), the ship's resident computer scientist; as well as David (voiced by Akio Otsuka in the Japanese), her lover, and together they plan to head for the escape shuttles. Exploring the deceased captain's study, Laura discovers a log file that reveals that goal of the mission is to capture the enemies and bring them back to Earth over a 5 year long space journey (2059 - 2064) for use as biological weapons on behalf of Vexx Industries, and that the crew is expendable in case of an accident.

David is attacked by one of the enemies, and when Laura discovers his corpse, she learns that David was actually an android. She performs a body-scan on herself and finds that not only is she also an android herself, but that one of the enemy larvae is developing in her neck. George confronts her and tries to wipe her memories, but is attacked and killed by an enemy. When Laura heads for the escape pods, she finds Kimberley again, who kills the larva nesting inside of Laura, and reveals that she and Parker were assigned by Vexx Industries to supervise the mission. Kimberley then triggers the ship's self-destruct mechanism, and leaves Laura to join Parker, killing herself while cradled up next to his corpse. As Laura heads for the escape shuttle, her guidance system runs out of battery, but instead she receives guidance from David, whose consciousness has been uploaded to the ship's computer systems. Laura reaches the escape shuttle just in time as the AKI blows up behind her, and she enters cryogenic sleep one more time as she makes the return voyage to Earth.

== Development ==
Commenting on the impetus for Enemy Zero, designer Kenji Eno said, "I wanted to ask the question, 'Why do human beings exist?' That's why the game evolved into something with an enclosed space and invisible enemy - so that you would be forced to think about your own existence."

Enemy Zero began life on Sony's PlayStation. Its unveiling at the 1996 PlayStation Expo in Tokyo was described by journalists as the highlight of the show. Irritated by Sony's failure to meet even a third of preorders for the PlayStation version of D (and to a lesser extent, their policy that all marketing for third party games had to be approved by them), at a press conference during the expo Kenji Eno made a shocking move. Eno showed a preview of Enemy Zero. At the end of the clip the PlayStation logo appeared, but slowly transitioned into the Sega Saturn logo, indicating that the game would now be a Saturn exclusive. Despite popular opinion that the Saturn cannot handle 3D games as well as the PlayStation, Eno commented "...the PlayStation and the Saturn aren't that different, so moving [Enemy Zero] to Saturn wasn't too difficult." Acclaim Entertainment, which had published the Saturn and PlayStation versions of D in North America and Europe, withdrew their interest in publishing Enemy Zero in those regions due to the change in platform.

Screenwriter Yūji Sakamoto collaborated with Eno on the game's dialogue and characterisation, working from a scenario developed by Eno. In a contemporary interview, Eno emphasised that he wanted to portray the human drama surrounding Laura rather than focus exclusively on suspense and action. Fumito Ueda, director of the video games Ico and Shadow of the Colossus, worked as an animator on Enemy Zero before becoming a video game director. Enemy Zero was in development for nine months.

The full motion video sequences were all rendered on Silicon Graphics workstations using PowerAnimator. In a June 1996 interview with Japanese Sega Saturn Magazine, director Kenji Eno explained that the game's full-motion video sequences used TrueMotion compression, which he considered superior to Motion JPEG for achieving smooth playback. He also discussed experiments with real-time polygon rendering, including moving light sources that illuminated the surrounding environment. Warp also developed support for the Saturn's analogue controller, allowing more flexible movement in the real-time polygonal sections. Contemporary previews described the controller's use for movement and turning while exploring the spacecraft.

The game's computer-generated cinematics were produced by a dedicated CG team at Warp, whose members included Shosaburō Tateishi, Hirohiko Sugamura, Fumito Ueda, Hiromi Hayashi and Tomohiro Miyazaki. The team discussed the production of the game's animated sequences in an August 1996 interview with Sega Saturn Magazine. Creature designer Yasushi Nirasawa also collaborated with Eno on the project, an unusual assignment given that the game's enemies were deliberately concealed from the player during real-time gameplay. His concept illustrations additionally explored the design of the spacecraft AKI.

=== Music ===
Enemy Zero

Soundtrack album by Michael Nyman
- Released: April 18, 1997
- Recorded: August 19, 1996, CTS Studio, London; September 28–30, Abbey Road Studios
- Genres: Soundtrack, Contemporary classical, minimalism
- Length: 49:54
- Label: First Smile
- Producers: Michael Nyman, Kenji Eno

Michael Nyman chronology
The Ogre (1996)	Enemy Zero (1997)	Concertos (1997)

Singles from Enemy Zero
- 1. "Enemy Zero Piano Sketches" Released: October 25, 2006

While Eno did the music for D, he recruited Michael Nyman, composer for films such as Gattaca and The Piano, to create the soundtrack for Enemy Zero. Eno was a fan of Nyman and had wanted to collaborate with him, but felt it would be impossible. After the Great Hanshin earthquake struck Kobe in 1995, Nyman visited the city to evaluate pianos he had donated to schools in the city. Eno met Nyman in a hotel room during his visit and convinced him to provide music for the game after a long six hour meeting. Eno had initially considered asking Ryuichi Sakamoto to create the score, but decided that his style would not be appropriate for the game.

During development, Eno discussed the challenge of adapting music for an interactive game, distinguishing compositions intended for independent listening from those accompanying gameplay. Nyman's initial piano pieces provided thematic material for the soundtrack, which was subsequently developed into further arrangements.

The music was performed by the Michael Nyman Orchestra and Sarah Leonard. "Confusion" is a modification of material from Nyman's previous score, The Ogre, while the Enemy Zero/Invisible Enemy/Battle theme were modified into portions of Nyman's score for Man with a Movie Camera. The main theme is a variation on "Bird Anthem" from Michael Nyman.

"Laura's Theme," "Digital Tragedy," and "Love Theme" are solo piano works and are included on the EP, Enemy Zero Piano Sketches, which was released eight months before the complete soundtrack, and two months before the game.

== Release ==
Enemy Zero was released in Japan for the Sega Saturn on 13 December 1996. The original release comprised four CD-ROMs and had a retail price of ¥6,800. It received a release for the system in North America on December 1 and in Europe on December 5, 1997. It was later ported to Microsoft Windows by Sega.

20 copies of a limited edition of the Saturn version were produced and sold for a price roughly equal to 2,000 US dollars. These special copies were hand-delivered to recipients by Kenji Eno himself. The game thus holds the record for the "Most Exclusive Special Edition" of a video game, according to the 2012 Guinness World Records Gamer's Edition. Due to popularity in Japan, Sega sponsored the production of a few Enemy Zero items such as the official Enemy Zero soundtrack by Michael Nyman, a model of the in-game gun, and a strategy guide.

== Reception ==
Reception

Review scores
Publication	Score
CNET Gamecenter	8/10 (SAT)
Consoles +	89% (SAT)
Edge	6/10 (SAT)
Electronic Gaming Monthly	8/10, 8.5/10, 7.5/10, 6.5/10 (SAT)
EP Daily	8/10 (SAT)
Famitsu	8/10, 7/10, 8/10, 8/10 (SAT)
GameSpot	5.3/10 (SAT)
Génération 4	1/6 (PC)
Mean Machines Sega	90% (SAT)
Next Generation	4/5 (SAT)
Maniac	37/100
Sega Saturn Magazine	88% (SAT)

Prior to Enemy Zero's U.S. release, John Ricciardi of Electronic Gaming Monthly (EGM) made it his pick for "Sleeper Hit of the Holidays" for 1997, having enjoyed what he played of the Japanese version. American magazine GameFan called it their "Best Import Game of the Year" of 1996. British magazine Mean Machines ran a full review of the Japanese version of the game, nearly a year before its release in Europe. They opined that the state-of-the-art full-motion video rendering was itself enough to give the game a high review score.

Upon release, Enemy Zero received a wide spectrum of reviews, and critics sharply disagreed on a number of points. GameSpot reported that the puzzles are all either so easy that the solution is obvious before the player even encounters the puzzle (e.g. finding a keycard tells the player that they will eventually find a locked door to open) or so illogical that even after completing the puzzle it is not apparent what triggered the solution. In contrast, Next Generation insisted that "puzzles are logically designed, not contrived." They also stated that the story never seems too derivative of the Alien films, whereas GamePro and Shawn Smith and John Ricciardi of EGM all described it as a blatant Alien rip-off. While most critics found the game's audio design atmospheric and immersive, The Electric Playground complained at the near-total absence of music and said the audio overall was "not the sort of creepy aural atmosphere that keeps you light on your feet and looking over your shoulder."

Critics almost unanimously praised the high quality of the full-motion video, but also almost unanimously criticized the resulting slow movement of the player character. GamePro went so far as to call Enemy Zero "the slowest, most boring game in ages", giving it a perfect 5/5 for graphics but 3/5 for sound and 1/5 for both control and fun factor. The reviewer also complained that the first-person shooting is frustratingly difficult. However, a slight majority of critics instead praised the difficult challenge of confronting invisible enemies with a slow-firing weapon, saying that it creates a unique and intense brand of tension. The Electric Playground, for example, called Enemy Zero one of the best Saturn games they played in 1997, opining that the energy gun and VPS game mechanics are "innovations" that help set the game apart. Next Generation also gave a generally positive overall assessment, saying that it "manages to advance the graphic adventure by emphasizing other senses besides pure sight" and felt the typical problems that FMV games have do not hinder the overall experience.

EGM's four reviewers focused on the game's cinematic atmosphere and presentation. They remarked that while the slow, cerebral pacing would be unappealing to many gamers, Enemy Zero is a generally successful attempt at creating a different and frightening experience. Sega Saturn Magazine similarly acknowledged that many Saturn gamers would find Enemy Zero excessively challenging and/or slow-paced, but concluded it was the most successful attempt to create a true "interactive movie" to date. GameSpot instead found it to be too much of a mixed bag, commenting that while the hybrid of an unconventional first-person shooter and an FMV-based puzzle game could have been a success, the poor design of the puzzles drags down the successful shooter segments. Edge highly praised the first of the game's three discs for offering a "suspense-ridden atmosphere" and tense encounters with invisible aliens, comparing it favorably to the films Alien and Blade Runner. However, the magazine criticized the other discs for ruining that suspense with "space soap" themes and an almost embarrassing plot.

Ulrich Steppberger of Maniac Games said that although the game replicates the ambiance of Alien, and has high quality FMVs, it also has problems typical of FMV games such as trudging through long barren corridors and solving puzzles. He also found the weapon unwieldy and hard to use, and felt the ping system to find the enemy is not useful. French magazine Consoles + concluded that, while it might not please everyone, it is a "gory, original and beautiful" adventure game with "high difficulty" and a "special atmosphere".

Electronic Gaming Monthly named it a runner-up for "Adventure Game of the Year" (behind Tomb Raider II) at their 1997 Editors' Choice Awards.

In the March 1997 issue of Computer and Video Games, Enemy Zero topped the magazine's Japanese multi-format sales chart. The game was a commercial success, with Eno projecting the Saturn version to sell between 500,000 to 700,000 and achieving that goal.
