= 2013 in esports =

This article documents the year 2013 in esports.

== Calendar ==
For extended events, the final date is listed.

Date	Game	Event	Location	Winner/s
January 20	League of Legends	IEM VII Katowice	Katowice, Poland	Gambit Gaming
February 2	League of Legends	HOT6iX OnGameNet The Champions Summer 2013	South Korea	
February 9	FIFA 13; Madden NFL 13; NHL 13	Virgin Gaming Challenge Series	Las Vegas	
March 9	StarCraft II; League of Legends	IEM VII World Championships	Hanover	
March 9	StarCraft II	Global StarCraft II League (GSL) Season 1		
March 9	Dota 2	G-League 2012 Season 2		
March 17	Call of Duty: Black Ops 2 League of Legends; StarCraft II	Major League Gaming (MLG) Winter Championships	Dallas, Texas	
March 30	six games	Copenhagen Games	Copenhagen	
March 31	Heroes of Newerth	Garena Star League	Thailand	Stay Green
April 7	ShootMania	ShootMania Launch Tournament	San Francisco	Fariko Impact
April 7	Call of Duty: Black Ops II	Call of Duty Championships	Hollywood Palladium; Los Angeles, California	Impact
April 21	Dota 2	RaidCall EMS One Spring Final		
April 21	League of Legends	Garena Premier League (GPL) Spring		Taipei Assassins
April 28	League of Legends	LCS Season 3 Spring Finals		
May 26	Dota 2	G-League		
June 1	StarCraft II	StarCraft II World Championship Series (WCS)	Korea	
June 2	Crossfire	Crossfire Stars (CFS) Season 1		
June 5	StarCraft II	StarCraft II WCS Europe		
June 9	StarCraft II	StarCraft II WCS Finals		
June 15	League of Legends	OnGameNet The Champions Spring		
June 17	StarCraft II	WCS - America		
June 17	numerous games	DreamHack Summer 2013	Sweden	
June 18	StarCraft II	E-Sport SM 2013 Finals		
June 23	League of Legends	League of Legends Pro League (LPL) Spring 2013	China	
June 30	numerous games	MLG Spring Championship 2013		
July 6	Dota 2	Dota 2 Super League		
July 9	Dota 2	Alienware Cup 2013 Season 1		
July 12–14	fighting games	Evolution 2013	Paris Las Vegas; Las Vegas, Nevada	
July 14		Gfinity London 2013		
July 17	Turbo Racing League	Turbo Racing League $1,000,000 Shell-Out		
July 20	StarCraft II	Global StarCraft II Team League (GSTL) Season 1 2013		
August 3	StarCraft II	2012–2013 SK Planet Proleague		
August 10	StarCraft II	WCS 2013 Season 2: Korea		
August 7–11	Dota 2	The International 2013	Seattle, United States	
August 18	StarCraft II	WCS 2013 Season 2: Europe		
August 18	League of Legends	GPL Summer 2013		ahq e-Sports Club
August 25	StarCraft II	WCS 2013 Season 2 Finals		
August 28–31	League of Legends	OnGameNet The Champions Summer 2013		
September 1	League of Legends	LCS Season 3 Summer		
September 1	Halo 4	Halo 4 Global Championship		
September 5	StarCraft II	WCS 2013 Season 2: America		
October 4	League of Legends	Season 3 World Championship		
October 6	World of Tanks	Wargaming League Russia Season II		
October 13	StarCraft II	Gfinity 2 London 2013		
October 19	StarCraft II	WCS 2013 Season 3: Korea		
October 23	StarCraft II	WCS 2013 Season 3: Europe		
October 27	StarCraft II	WCS 2013 Season 3 Finals		
November 3	StarCraft II	WCS 2013 Season 3: America		
November 3	numerous games	ESWC 2013		
November 9	StarCraft II	WCS 2013 Global Finals		
November 9		BlizzCon 2013		
November 10	Dota 2	Nexon Sponsorship League Season 1		
November 10		National Electronic Sports Tournament (NEST)	Kunshan	
November 17	World of Tanks	WGL NA Season II		
November 17	Dota 2	Techlabs Cup Grand Final 2013	Moscow, Russia	
November 23		Global StarCraft II Team League (GSTL) Season 2 2013		
November 22–24	numerous games	MLG Fall Championship 2013	Columbus, Ohio	
November 24	League of Legends	LPL Summer 2013	China	
November 24	League of Legends etc.	IEM VIII Cologne	Cologne	
November 25	Dota 2	Nexon Invitational Super Match	South Korea	
November 30	League of Legends; Counter-Strike: Global Offensive numerous games	DreamHack Winter 2013		
November 28 - December 1	multiple games	World Cyber Games 2013	Kunshan, China	
December 1	StarCraft II	StarCraft Asian Open 2013		
December 1	StarCraft II; League of Legends	IEM VIII Singapore	Singapore	
December 8	Dota 2	RaidCall EMS One Fall 2013		
December 14	Call of Duty: Black Ops 2 Counter-Strike: Global Offensive; StarCraft II	Svenska E-sportcupen 2013 Grand Finals	Gothenburg, Sweden	
December 14	Dota 2	Fragbite Masters 2013		
December 14	Super Street Fighter IV Arcade Edition v2012 Ultimate Marvel vs. Capcom 3 Street Fighter x Tekken v2013	Capcom Cup 2013	Hyatt Regency San Francisco Airport; Burlingame, California	HORI Sako (AE2012); AGE NYChrisG (UMvC3); Infiltration (SFxT)
