= Sunman (video game) =

- Sunman title screen
- Developer: EIM
- Publisher: Sunsoft
- Director: Kenji Eno
- Producers: Chou Musou; Ikko Okumura
- Programmers: Hideki Miura; Takaya Nakamura
- Artists: Shingo Aoyama; Yoshiaki Kadowaki
- Composer: Hirohiko Takayama
- Platform: Nintendo Entertainment System
- Release: Canceled (intended for 1992)
- Genre: Action
- Mode: Single-player

Sunman is an unreleased action video game developed by EIM and planned to be published by Sunsoft for the Nintendo Entertainment System in 1992. Despite being mostly complete, it was never commercially released.

== Gameplay ==
The gameplay is similar to Sunsoft's Batman games, Batman: The Video Game and Batman: Return of the Joker, in that the character can run, jump, punch, and duck. However, in this game, the player can also fly simply by pushing up. There are also some side scrolling flying levels where the player can shoot laser/heat vision from Sunman's eyes. The game is divided into five stages, each made up of one to four areas, with a boss at the end of each stage.

== History ==
Sunman compared to its earlier incarnation as a Superman title.

The game features a superhero, named Sunman. He is reminiscent of Superman with his cape, and flying abilities - furthermore, the game's title screen is similar to the Superman logo. Sunsoft's involvement with other DC Comics character licenses lead some to speculate that Sunman was intended to be a Superman game. For an undisclosed reason, DC decided not to go along. The game had some changes made to lose the protagonist's likeness to Superman. In an interview with planner/director Kenji Eno, it was confirmed that this was originally intended to be a Superman game.

The game was obtained by The Lost Levels, a website that specializes in unreleased and prototype video games, from a European collector without any information on what it was. It was to much surprise that the game could be functionally played through from start to finish. The game was made available for play as a ROM for use with an NES emulator. The early, rough prototype of the ROM was also made for release on The Lost Levels. The prototype had sprites of Superman as the original sprites for the main character, and the background music played in-game replaced with John Williams's Superman Theme. Another unreleased Sunsoft cart in the US can be made to confirm that this was indeed Superman originally, as the levels are identical to Sunman, but they are in a less finished form, and the player is able to skip levels by pausing and pressing the select button.

In February 2014, a ROM hack was released by a user with the pseudonym Pacnsacdave of a full Sunman to Superman NES conversion. The hack changes the title screen, cutscenes, and sprites to those of the actual Superman prototype ROM.

== See also ==
- Superman (1987 video game) (Kemco)
- Superman (1992 video game) (Sunsoft)
