= Kite Man: Hell Yeah! =

American adult animated black comedy superhero television series

- Genre: Black comedy; Superhero
- Based on: Kite Man by: Bill Finger; Dick Sprang
- Developed by: Patrick Schumacker; Justin Halpern; Dean Lorey
- Showrunners: Dean Lorey; Katie Rich
- Voices of: Matt Oberg; Stephanie Hsu; James Adomian; Jonathan Banks; Natasia Demetriou; Michael Imperioli; Janelle James
- Music by: Michael Gatt; Jefferson Friedman
- Country of origin: United States
- Original language: English
- No. of seasons: 1
- No. of episodes: 10

Production
- Executive producers: Patrick Schumacker; Justin Halpern; Kaley Cuoco; Suzanne McCormack; Dean Lorey; Jennifer Coyle; Sam Register
- Producer: Joann Estoesta
- Editors: Dave Courter; Annie De Brock
- Running time: 23–24 minutes
- Production companies: Delicious Non-Sequitur; Yes, Norman Productions; Lorey Stories; DC Entertainment; Warner Bros. Animation

Original release
- Network: Max
- Release: July 18 – September 12, 2024

Related
- Harley Quinn

Kite Man: Hell Yeah! is an American adult animated black comedy superhero television series based on the DC Comics character Kite Man created by Bill Finger and Dick Sprang. The series stars Matt Oberg, Stephanie Hsu and James Adomian, and follows the adventures of Kite Man and his current girlfriend Golden Glider who have supported the purchase of a local bar named Noonan's.

The series serves as a spin-off of Harley Quinn, where Kite Man was featured as a supporting character and ex-fiancé to Poison Ivy. The series consists of ten episodes, with Matt Oberg returning to voice Kite Man. Much of the voice cast were revealed in September 2023.

Kite Man: Hell Yeah! premiered on July 18, 2024.

== Premise ==
The series follows the saucy adventures of Kite Man and his girlfriend Golden Glider who live together in Noonan's, Gotham City's seediest dive bar. They take their relationship to the next level by opening a bar in the shadow of Lex Luthor's Hall of Doom.

== Voice cast ==
=== Main ===
- Matt Oberg as Charles "Chuck" Brown / Kite Man / Beast Mode, Fake Calendar Man
- Stephanie Hsu as Lisa Snart / Golden Glider (Note: Hsu replaces Cathy Ang who previously voiced Golden Glider in the Harley Quinn series.), Stephanie Brown / Spoiler
- James Adomian as Bane, Fake Riddler, Lawrence Snart, Young Penguin, Etrigan the Demon (Note: Adomian replaces John Stamos who voiced Etrigan the Demon in the Harley Quinn Valentine's day special.), Man-Bat
- Jonathan Banks as Sean Noonan
- Natasia Demetriou as Malice Vundabar
- Michael Imperioli as Joe / Moe Dubelz
- Janelle James as Queen of Fables (Note: James replaces Wanda Sykes who previously voiced Queen of Fables in the Harley Quinn series.)

=== Supporting ===
- Dee Bradley Baker as Chessure
- Maria Bamford as Baby-Doll
- Tisha Campbell as Tawny Young
- Vic Chao as Leonard Snart / Captain Cold (Note: Chao replaces Ben Levin who voiced Captain Cold in the Harley Quinn series.)
- Margaret Cho as Rebecca Chen
- Lance Reddick as Lex Luthor (episodes 1–8) (Note: Reddick originally replaced Giancarlo Esposito who previously voiced Lex Luthor in the Harley Quinn series.)
- Andy Daly as Darryl Brown, Sinestro, Toyman (Note: Daly replaces Tom Hollander who previously voiced Toyman in the Harley Quinn series.)
- Keith David as Darkseid (Note: David replaces Michael Ironside who previously voiced Darkseid in the Harley Quinn series.)
- Carla Delaney as Goldilocks
- Phil LaMarr as Detective Chimp, DeSaad, Black Manta, Martian Manhunter
- Judith Light as Helen Villigan
- Eddie Pepitone as Sixpack
- Amuche Chukudebelu as Lex Luthor (episodes 9–10) (Note: Chukudebulu took over the role of Lex Luthor after Lance Reddick's death.)
- Rory Scovel as Gus the Goon
- Rhea Seehorn as Insect Queen

=== Guest ===
- Ben Aldridge as Jeremy Karne
- Lake Bell as Poison Ivy, Barbara Ann Minerva / Cheetah
- Lacey Chabert as Kenneth's Mother
- Kaley Cuoco as Dr. Harleen Quinzel / Harley Quinn
- Brycen Hall as Young Captain Cold
- Richard Kind as Health Inspector
- Araceli Prasarttongosoth as Young Golden Glider
- Cristina Pucelli as Kenneth
- Jim Rash as Riddler
- Katie Rich as Stacy
- J. B. Smoove as Frank the Plant
- Alan Tudyk as Clayface, Ocean Master
- Casey Wilson as Betty

== Episodes ==
No.	Title	Directed by	Written by	Original release date
1	"Pilot, Hell Yeah!"	Yoriaki Mochizuki	Dean Lorey; Patrick Schumacker; Justin Halpern	July 18, 2024
With the Anti-Life Equation in his possession, Lex Luthor reluctantly hires Kite Man as an aerial spy to guard the Legion of Doom against the Justice League due to the Legion's flying villains being unavailable. Kite Man fails at his task, so Luthor takes revenge by attempting to buy Kite Man's hangout, Noonan's bar for $10 million. Kite Man and his girlfriend Golden Glider strive to raise the money first, but are unable to borrow it from anyone. Harley Quinn and Poison Ivy advise the two to rob from villains worse than them. With help from former Legion member Bane, the group attack the mansion of Kite Man's father Darryl, who willingly surrenders his money as a reward for Kite Man finally standing up to him. Luthor's "revenge" is later revealed to be a deception so that he can hide the Equation behind Noonan's, unaware that Darkseid is also on a hunt for it.
2	"Grand Reopening, Hell Yeah!"	Jeff Wamester	Conner Shin	July 18, 2024
While preparing for Noonan's grand reopening, Kite Man hires Darkseid's entitled goddaughter, Malice, as a server despite Glider wanting to hire Bane for the job. Meanwhile, Kite Man grows desperate for Darryl to respond to his invite to the event. Displeased with Malice's attitude, Glider invites Luthor, among other notable Legion members, to the party, unaware that Luthor is throwing his own party to ensure Noonan's stays irrelevant. The latter event is subsequently ruined by Malice's cat Chessure, who escapes and temporarily becomes kaiju-sized after eating several civilians, unintentionally drawing attention to Noonan's. After realizing that he should focus more on impressing people who actually like him, Kite Man fires Malice, but Glider promotes her to social media manager to make Darkseid happy while Bane takes a job as bouncer. Elsewhere, a goon named Gus takes the Queen of Fables' head in as his kindergarten class pet, where she is forced to entertain his students before stealing the body of one boy's mother after being taken home.
3	"Villigan's, Hell Yeah!"	Ben Jones	Chris Marrs	July 25, 2024
Villigan's, a villain-themed chain restaurant, opens across the street, threatening Noonan's business. Meanwhile, Kite Man feels that he is not moving fast enough in his relationship with Glider and asks if they can move in together, though she avoids the subject upon noticing that he found her secret relationship spreadsheet. Kite Man tries to reignite their bond by discovering Villigan's intentions, but proves reluctant to kill the manager as he has never killed before. Meanwhile, Glider accepts Villigan's offer for a free spa day with the Queen, Malice, and Chessure. During this, she confesses that she loves Kite Man and has been ready to move in with him, but is afraid that she might kill him due to her unstable powers. The group later learn they stumbled onto a death trap owned by Villigan's founder Baby-Doll who reveals her intent to kill Kite Man and destroy Noonan's with a rigged gift basket. However, Kite Man throws the basket at the last second, destroying Villigan's. Kite Man and Glider later reconcile and agree to move in together.
4	"Portal Potty, Hell Yeah!"	Joonki Park	Vidhya Iyer	August 1, 2024
While moving in above Noonan's, Kite Man notices the lack of photos from Glider's youth, but she refuses to discuss her background with him. Meanwhile, Bane accidentally travels back to 1986 after defecating in the apartment's toilet, where he falls in love with Glider's mother Rebecca Chen. Through her brother Captain Cold, Kite Man learns their alcoholic, bickering parents frequented Noonan's in 1986, which is where Glider accidentally killed them upon using her powers for the first time. After falling out with Glider, Kite Man travels back in time to prevent her parents' deaths, with Glider following soon after. Despite saving Rebecca, Glider's father, Lawrence Snart, is killed in an explosion. Glider ultimately decides to focus on the present instead of the past, only to discover that Rebecca is still not around in the present. Unbeknownst to Glider, Rebecca ran away following Lawrence's death before being trapped in a jail cell and gassed by an unknown figure.
5	"Prison Break, Hell Yeah!"	Rick Morales	Katie Rich	August 8, 2024
After returning to the present, Bane learns Rebecca was imprisoned in his old home, the Pit. He, Kite Man, and Glider head there, where they discover Villigan's owner Helen Villigan purchased the Pit from the League of Shadows and is using brainwashed prisoners as slave labor. Braving the workers and various death traps, the trio rescue Rebecca and bring her back safely. When she awakens later however, Rebecca is not enthused to see Glider. Meanwhile, Malice closes Noonan's early to prepare for the arrival of her immortal boyfriend despite the presence of a health inspector. She asks everyone present to pretend she does not work there, but the boyfriend kills several patrons, leading to her telling the truth and him dumping her. These cause her to feel emotions for the first time. Through her actions, Noonan's receives a "D-" from the inspector, narrowly saving it from being closed down.
6	"Mother/Daughter Day, Hell Yeah!"	Jeff Wamester	Leslie Schapira	August 15, 2024
Glider attempts to reconcile with Rebecca via a mother-daughter day, with Malice tagging along at Rebecca's insistence. Before leaving, Rebecca tells Kite Man that he is not right for her daughter given his lack of prospects and powers, which gets to him. Rebecca later abandons Glider, confessing that she never wanted a child and left because she did not want to be killed by Glider's powers like Lawrence. Angered, Glider tricks her into using the portal potty to travel back to 1986. Meanwhile, despite his crush on Rebecca, Bane reunites with Betty, an old fling from Valentine's Day, (Note: As depicted in "Harley Quinn: A Very Problematic Valentine's Day Special".) who convinces him to give their relationship another chance. Concurrently, at Noonan's owner, Sean Noonan's suggestion, Kite Man separately meets with Etrigan and Helen to get superpowers, but is told by her that he must give up his kite in exchange. He agrees and becomes Beast Mode, gaining the ability to telekinetically bully others, which costs him his relationship with Glider. Satisfied that her plan is working, Helen burns his old kite.
7	"Sexiest Villain Alive, Hell Yeah!"	Joonki Park	Dean Lorey	August 22, 2024
With Bane, Luthor, and Beast Mode in the running for "Sexist Villain Alive," Malice upgrades Bane's wardrobe to increase his chances, completing his look with the briefcase containing the Anti-Life Equation, which she thinks is an accessory. Meanwhile, Glider deduces that Helen can change Beast Mode back into Kite Man, so she nabs Helen's power controller with the help of Clayface, but only the real Helen's eyes can bypass the security. At the award ceremony, the Queen and Moe bring Toyman and Insect Queen as dates, with the latter luring Moe back to her hive to kill him. The Queen and Toyman follow to warn him, only to stumble across the Queen's old body preserved in honey. Helen has the contest rigged in Beast Mode's favor, ordering him to distract Luthor with his insulting victory speech while her hummingbird drones hunt down the Equation, which Luthor has also located. The briefcase eventually lands in the possession of Glider, who merges with the Equation and finally gains control of her powers. She forces Helen to let her access the power controller, restoring Kite Man, and the two mend their relationship.
8	"Just Right, Hell Yeah!"	Diana Huh	Chris Marrs	August 29, 2024
Kite Man and Glider are on the run after obtaining the Anti-Life Equation and are allowed to hide out for one night at a resort owned by Frank the Plant. Kite Man is concerned that the Equation is corrupting Glider after she attacks random civilians out of paranoia and insecurity. Glider is faced with visions of Rebecca, who suggests that they can rule the world together now that she has control over her powers. Meanwhile, Bane is tasked with babysitting Goldilocks, who has escaped from the Queen's Book of Fables, and takes her along for a meeting with Luthor and Helen, who have temporarily joined forces to track down the Equation. Impressed by Goldilocks' high standards in self-esteem, Bane decides to spend more time with her and leaves, though the Equation's location is outed due to a call from Frank. Helen sends an army of robots for the Equation, but at Kite Man's insistence, Glider tosses it into a nearby nuclear plant, destroying the robots in the process, and restoring Glider's personality. Ultimately, the Equation remains intact after the explosion. Note: The episode was dedicated to Lance Reddick, who died in March 2023 during production.
9	"To Get to the Other Side, Hell Yeah!"	Jeff Wamester	Jess Lieberman & Lexi Slater	September 5, 2024
To seal away the Anti-Life Equation's corrupting power, Kite Man steals a chicken delivery truck and keeps the briefcase in the back, which mutates one of the chickens into a kaiju-sized carnivore. Meanwhile, Malice is visited by Darkseid, who offers to take her back to Apokolips, though she is conflicted about the proposal. When Six-Pack lets it slip that Kite Man and Glider have the Equation, Malice lies that Luthor actually has it. Darkseid learns that he was misled and sets out to find the Equation himself, unaware that Luthor plans to recapture it by holding Noonan at gunpoint to lure Kite Man back home. His attempt is thwarted by the rest of the bar gang, including Bane, who unknowingly sends Goldilocks to the Portal Potty to shield her from the violence. After Chessure fails to subdue the giant chicken, Glider and Kite Man defeat it by making it cough up the briefcase. Back on Apokolips, Darkseid, determined to complete his search for the Equation, decides to confront Malice about the truth, using a tracking app that came with Chessure.
10	"Hero Stuff, Hell Yeah!" (Note: Originally titled "Impossible Schemes, Hell Yeah!" when the episode first aired.)	Joonki Park	Dean Lorey	September 12, 2024
Helen informs Kite Man and Glider that according to her algorithm, the world population would be fully destroyed no matter who handles the Anti-Life Equation, except for Kite Man. The couple hold a meeting with their friends at Noonan's and decide that Kite Man should commit suicide after absorbing the Equation, with Glider being the mercy killer. Luthor tracks them down and arrives with the Legionnaires, resulting in a brawl with the bar gang. Darkseid arrives as well and almost takes the Equation, but Helen's robots and Glider delay him until Rebecca, who travelled back to the present upon hearing the stories from Goldilocks, grabs the Equation and jumps inside the Book of Fables. The book is then taken far away by Martian Manhunter, who has been disguised as Gus. Luthor retreats, while Darkseid and Helen make peace with the Noonan's group. Rebecca is revealed to have become the Evil Fairy Godmother inside the book and holds the power of the Equation. As she prepares for a future invasion with the demonized storybook characters, Brainiac's Skull Ship approaches Earth from outer space.

== Production ==
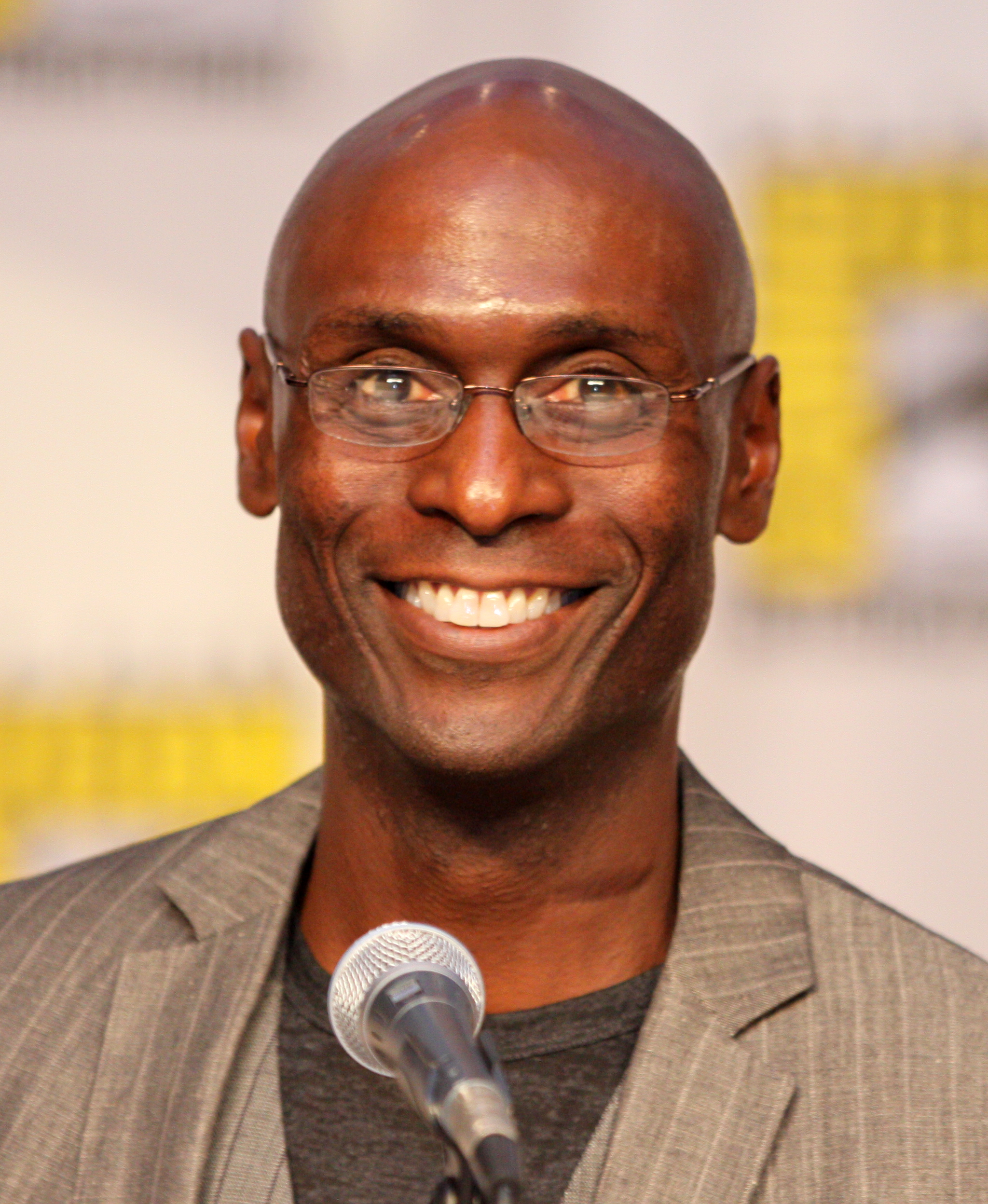
Lex Luthor was one of Lance Reddick's final roles before he died in 2023. The eighth episode, "Just Right, Hell Yeah!", was his final appearance and was dedicated to his memory.

=== Development ===
Harley Quinn showrunner Patrick Schumacker revealed at South by Southwest in March 2022, during the "Not Kidding Around: Warner Bros. Animation and the Reimagining of Iconic Characters for an Adult Audience" panel that development was underway for a spin-off featuring the character of Kite Man in the lead role.

In April 2022, HBO Max announced that it had given a series order, which would be titled Noonan's. That July, it was reported that Harley Quinn co-developer Dean Lorey and Katie Rich would serve as showrunners.

In June 2023, at the Annecy International Animation Film Festival, it was announced that the series would be re-titled as Kite Man: Hell Yeah!.

=== Casting ===
After the show was announced with a series order, Matt Oberg was announced to be reprising the role of Kite Man. In September 2023, alongside the release of the teaser trailer, James Adomian and Rory Scovel were confirmed to reprise their roles as Bane and Gus the Goon, alongside Stephanie Hsu, Jonathan Banks, Lance Reddick, Michael Imperioli, Natasia Demetriou, Judith Light, Janelle James, and Keith David joining the series, as well with Kaley Cuoco and Lake Bell guest starring as Harley Quinn and Poison Ivy.

== Marketing ==
The official teaser for the series was released on September 14, 2023, the same day as the release of the season 4 finale of Harley Quinn. The teaser shows scenes of Kite Man saying the words, the Queen of Fables, all the Legion of Doom characters during the quote "Take to Wing it", and finally a few clips of the first episode that was seen that ends with the title card saying the show's title. A full-length trailer was released on July 1, 2024. Kite Man: Hell Yeah! premiered on Max on July 18, 2024.

== Critical reception ==
Kite Man: Hell Yeah! received generally positive reviews from critics, who praised its humor and lighthearted tone. IndieWire described the show as an "outstanding new sitcom" that works as both a comedy and a superhero spinoff, while Decider recommended the series, calling it a "goofy-bloody" addition to the DC universe with a focus on lesser-known villains. Screen Rant highlighted the humor in the show's setting, managing a bar, and noted it stands out among DC's animated offerings for its comedic approach. In terms of character performances, IGN Movies and Paste specifically commend Bane, noting that he steals the show with his engaging presence. This sentiment is echoed by AV Club, which awarded the series a B+ and described it as a "delightful treat" for fans. Meanwhile, New York Times emphasizes the series' fun and irreverent tone, aligning it with the offbeat energy of the Harley Quinn series.

However, Collider offered a more critical view, acknowledging Kite Man: Hell Yeah! as a "worthy spin-off" but pointing out some flaws that may hinder its overall effectiveness. Despite these criticisms, the show remains largely celebrated for its irreverent tone and comedic charm.
