= List of Harley Quinn episodes =

Harley Quinn is an American adult animated black comedy superhero television series based on the DC Comics character of the same name created by Paul Dini and Bruce Timm. The series is written and executive-produced by Justin Halpern, Patrick Schumacker, and Dean Lorey, and follows the adventures of Harley Quinn and her partner Poison Ivy after leaving her boyfriend, the Joker. The show premiered on November 29, 2019.

As of March 20, 2025, 57 episodes of Harley Quinn have been released, concluding the fifth season. A sixth season is in development.

== Series overview ==
Season	Episodes	Originally released		
Season	Episodes	First released	Last released	Network
1	13	November 29, 2019	February 21, 2020	DC Universe
2	13	April 3, 2020	June 26, 2020	DC Universe
3	10	July 28, 2022	September 15, 2022	HBO Max
Special		February 9, 2023		HBO Max
4	10	July 27, 2023	September 14, 2023	Max
5	10	January 16, 2025	March 20, 2025	Max

== Episodes ==
=== Season 1 (2019–20) ===
No. overall	No. in season	Title	Directed by	Written by	Original release date
1	1	"Til Death Do Us Part"	Juan Meza-Leon	Dean Lorey and Justin Halpern & Patrick Schumacker	November 29, 2019
Following an unsuccessful yacht robbery, Harley Quinn is sent to Arkham Asylum, though she firmly believes that her boss and lover the Joker will break her out. A year later, her best friend, Poison Ivy, breaks her out during a prison break and tries to convince her that he does not love her. Despite Ivy's support, Harley's attempt to break up with the Joker fails after he convinces her to stay with him. The Riddler provokes the Joker into sending Harley to kill him before capturing her and Batman and giving the Joker the choice to save one while the other dies. When the Joker ultimately chooses Batman, Harley finally realizes she never meant anything to him. After learning Ivy and Riddler devised the death trap to drive that point home and that she was never really in any danger, Harley undergoes a costume change, officially breaks up with the Joker, and declares her intention to make a name for herself in the criminal underworld.
2	2	"A High Bar"	Matt Garofalo; Ben Jones; Frank Marino	Jane Becker	December 6, 2019
Believing she has to join the Legion of Doom to prove herself as a supervillain, Harley attempts to crash one of their criminal enterprises with Ivy's help. However, they accidentally crash a bar mitzvah for the Penguin's nephew, Joshua. When the Joker learns of Harley's presence and arrives at the party, Harley struggles to dissociate herself from him and prove to the attending villains, Bane, the Scarecrow, and Two-Face, how much better she is doing without him. This is exacerbated by her attempt to pull off a heist nearby, only to learn it was a staged heist with actors for Joshua to experience. Meanwhile, Ivy is relentlessly hit on by Kite Man, who inadvertently infects a group of boys with her pheromones, not realizing it will kill them by turning them into plants. They rush to her apartment to retrieve the antidote and return in time to help Harley fight off the other villains. Using her psychology background, Harley convinces them to stop taking abuse from Joker, forcing him to leave. Despite what happened, Harley remains committed to her goal of joining the Legion while Ivy cures the infected boys.
3	3	"So, You Need a Crew?"	Cecilia Aranovich Hamilton	Jess Dweck	December 13, 2019
After the Joker hijacks a robbery she was committing, Harley realizes that she needs a crew to pull off legitimate heists and attract the Legion of Doom's attention. However, she struggles to recruit others to her cause due to her gender and past association with the Joker. After talking with the Queen of Fables, Harley decides she needs other downtrodden villains like her, and recruits Doctor Psycho, who was kicked out of the Legion by Lex Luthor for calling Wonder Woman and Giganta the "C-word" on national television, and Clayface, Gotham City's self-proclaimed shapeshifting thespian extraordinaire. For their first heist, Harley decides to rob Maxie Zeus' Olympic gold medals as revenge for insults he made against her during her quest. Despite initial struggles, Harley, Psycho, and Clayface ultimately succeed after beating up Zeus before she sells the medals to purchase a nuclear warhead and force Gotham into naming a highway after her. Upon making the news, the media begins to consider her a potential competitor for the Joker, much to his ire.
4	4	"Finding Mr. Right"	Juan Meza-Leon	Jess Dweck	December 20, 2019
In search of a nemesis, Harley goes after Batman by stealing the Batmobile, but ends up with Robin, making her the laughing stock of the criminal underworld. Even worse, Robin appears on Tawny Young's talk show and lies about Harley agreeing to be his nemesis. After a failed attempt to get Superman to be her nemesis by kidnapping Lois Lane, Harley recruits King Shark into her crew, captures Robin, and threatens him into confessing he lied before revealing Young's talk show audience from behind a curtain to publicly humiliate him. When King Shark goes berserk after smelling blood, Batman arrives and subdues him before getting into a three-way brawl with Harley and an arriving Joker and Ivy. The Joker ends the fight by kidnapping Robin and forcing Batman to pursue them. Much to Ivy's dismay, she and Harley's crew are evicted from her apartment by her cybernetic landlord Sy Borgman. Batman later comforts a rescued Robin and assures him he can wait until he is ready for his own nemesis.
5	5	"Being Harley Quinn"	Juan Meza-Leon	Adam Stein	December 27, 2019
While shopping around for a new lair, Harley is unable decide what her "brand" is and goes into a fourth degree brain-freeze. Ivy has Psycho bring them, Clayface, and King Shark into Harley's mind and meet with her consciousness. However, she accidentally triggers her mental defenses and locks them all in. While trying to find the "Emergency Exit" in her subconscious, Harley discovers her indecision comes from the belief her "origin story" was not her decision and that she altered her memory to believe that her becoming a villain was Joker's doing. Choosing the moment she broke up with him as her true "origin story", Harley partially cures herself. Meanwhile, Borgman finds Harley and the crew's comatose bodies and believes they committed suicide, so he takes them to an abandoned mall to cremate them. At the last minute, everyone wakes up and nearly kill Borgman. Upon seeing the mall however, Harley decides to make it their new lair and allows Borgman to join her crew after learning he was a former secret agent.
6	6	"You're a Damn Good Cop, Jim Gordon"	Cecilia Aranovich Hamilton	Tom Hyndman	January 3, 2020
Harley's crew steals a mysterious device from Wayne Enterprises, but Clayface's arm gets severed and comes to life. Becoming depressed after learning Batman fails to see him as a friend, Commissioner Gordon interrogates Clayface's hand for the location of Harley's crew, but ends up bonding with it. While Harley, Clayface, and King Shark try to recover the hand, Ivy and Psycho seek revenge on an online personality called the Cowled Critic for slandering them. King Shark is beaten by police officers and sent to prison while Ivy and Psycho learn the Cowled Critic is his estranged son, Herman, and makes amends with him. While in a shoot-out with Gordon, Harley discovers the device is a teleporter when it sends her to the Batcave. Once Harley realizes she had been selfish and ignoring her teammates, she encourages Batman to help stop Gordon after he starts obsessively defending the hand. Batman reconciles with Gordon, Clayface reabsorbs his hand, and Harley and her crew escape. As they celebrate, they realize they forgot King Shark and quickly break him out of prison.
7	7	"The Line"	Juan Meza-Leon	Laura Moran	January 10, 2020
When the Queen of Fables is transferred from her U.S. Master Tax Guide Book prison to Arkham Asylum, Harley frees her so she can join her crew and help them steal a personal force field device from S.T.A.R. Labs. When the Queen slaughters an innocent family who witnessed them, however, the horrified crew kick her out as they are not willing to sacrifice innocent lives. They then use the force field device to steal a weather-controlling machine from Kord Industries to ransom Gotham, but the Queen shows up to steal it for herself. They are interrupted by Jason Praxis, a surviving member of the family with electrical powers who seeks revenge on the Queen for their murder. Harley uses the force field device to protect the Queen, subdue Praxis, and get her to leave. Killing Praxis on her way out however, the Queen tells Harley that only villains willing to cross any line can succeed and that she will regret letting her live. The crew later tries to program the weather machine, but accidentally cause it to self-destruct. Meanwhile, Ivy starts dating Kite Man, but his idiocy leaves her embarrassed to be around him in public.
8	8	"L.O.D.R.S.V.P."	Matt Garofalo; Ben Jones; Frank Marino	Tom Hyndman	January 17, 2020
After Harley's crew steal Atlantean jewels, they are invited to join the Legion of Doom's headquarters, where Luthor reinstates Psycho. However, he secretly reveals to Ivy that he is not actually interested in Harley and will not let her join unless she joins as well. Ivy refuses and tries to warn Harley of Luthor's treachery. Suddenly, Aquaman breaks into the Hall of Doom and beats up several villains while seeking revenge for Harley's theft, but she tricks him into breaking an aquarium and focus on saving the fish. As thanks, the Legion inducts Harley as an official member. Harley accuses Ivy of lying to her and they angrily part ways. Meanwhile, Psycho and Borgman deal with a mutant monster in their lair's basement. When Psycho tries to kill it, Borgman stops him, revealing the monster is his sister Mirielle, who was mutated because of his actions. Psycho uses his powers to let the siblings communicate and reconcile, but Mirielle is released into the streets and goes on a rampage. The next day, Harley and her crew minus Ivy go to the Hall of Doom, only to encounter the Joker.
9	9	"A Seat at the Table"	Cecilia Aranovich Hamilton	Jordan Weiss	January 24, 2020
To Harley's surprise, the Joker congratulates her on joining the Legion of Doom, treating her as an equal. Harley reconciles with Ivy and promises to help her attack an environmentally unfriendly company called Planetwide Pavers. However, her crew are treated as lowly henchmen and Bane hires them to help him get revenge on a clerk for always getting his name wrong. Harley attends a dinner date with the Joker, intending to persuade him to convince Luthor to elevate her crew's status, but forgets to due to how much fun she is having. While planting a bomb for Bane, King Shark ends up being hospitalized after the former loses patience and detonates it early. When Batman pursues them, Joker kisses Harley before shoving her out of his helicopter to slow the Dark Knight down. While the crew and Ivy stand vigil over King Shark in the hospital, they see an out-of-context image of the Joker and Harley kissing on the news. When Harley arrives, they accuse her of taking advantage of them and cut ties with her. Later that night, Ivy tries to attack Planetwide Pavers by herself, but is captured.
10	10	"Bensonhurst"	Colin Heck; Ben Jones	Laura Moran	January 31, 2020
Depressed over her crew abandoning her, Harley returns home to her parents in Bensonhurst, Brooklyn, but becomes upset with her deadbeat father. Later that night, an assassin attacks them and kills Harley's grandmother before she defeats him. Her father claims he owes a loan shark money, so Harley beats him and his henchmen to force them to leave her father alone. Meanwhile, Ivy is trapped in a laboratory, but manages to use a dandelion to tell her sentient plant Frank to get Harley's help before learning that the Scarecrow is her captor. Another assassin attacks and kills Harley's grandfather before she defeats her. Suddenly, her parents attack her, explaining that someone put a bounty on her and they want revenge because her reputation as a supervillain turned them into neighborhood pariahs. An enraged Harley defeats them before ultimately sparing and disowning them. Later, Frank finds Harley and tells her that Ivy is in trouble. Elsewhere, Bane discovers that Joshua Cobblepot put the bounty on Harley as revenge for her ruining his bar mitzvah and berates him for using a traceable credit card before destroying it to cancel the bounty.
11	11	"Harley Quinn Highway"	Vinton Heuck	Adam Stein	February 7, 2020
Harley reunites with her crew to apologize and request their help in rescuing Ivy. They agree, but only for Ivy's sake. Meanwhile, the Scarecrow harvests Ivy's pheromones so he can use them to destroy Gotham before poisoning her with his fear toxin, sending her into a panic. While Borgman protects their bodies, Psycho brings the crew into Ivy's head, where Frank informs them that the only way to save Ivy is to destroy the thing she fears the most, which initially appears as the Grim Reaper. Harley defeats the Reaper, but sees her face under the hood before she and the crew wake up. The Scarecrow tries to escape on the Harley Quinn Highway, but Borgman transforms into a car so the crew can give chase. Amidst said chase, Ivy tells Harley her fear is being abandoned by someone she trusted and that she resents her for being with the Joker instead of helping her. Harley attempts to make amends by stopping the Scarecrow, but he succeeds in poisoning the Gotham Reservoir and infecting the city's water supply with Ivy's pheromones; turning most of Gotham's trees into violent monsters.
12	12	"Devil's Snare"	Juan Meza-Leon	Jane Becker	February 14, 2020
The Scarecrow crop-dusts fear toxin around Gotham's perimeter to force thousands of civilians towards the park with the murderous trees. As Batman tracks him down, the Justice League arrives to stop the trees. They assume Harley's crew is behind the attacks and attempt to send them to the Phantom Zone, but Ivy uses Wonder Woman's Lasso of Truth to prove them wrong. Suddenly, the Queen of Fables traps the League in her fairy tale book before using a beanstalk to send Harley and her crew to be attacked by a giant cyclops. With Kite Man's help, they are able to return to the ground safely. Just then, the Joker uses a large tower to destroy the Hall of Doom as he enacts his plans to take over Gotham and orders the Queen to kill Harley and her crew. Ivy uses the contaminated water to enlarge herself and fight the trees while Harley kills the Queen. Just as Harley makes amends with Ivy, the Joker kills the latter.
13	13	"The Final Joke"	Brandon McKinney	Tom Hyndman	February 21, 2020
Harley, her crew, Frank, and Kite Man hold an impromptu funeral for Ivy before joining forces with Batman to avenge her. However, Clayface inadvertently ruins the plan and gets the crew and Batman captured while Harley is forced into hiding. With his takeover largely complete, Joker spends the next week subjugating Gotham and torturing Batman and the crew, only to get bored. Hoping to help, the Scarecrow unmasks Batman, but Joker kills the former for ruining the "mystery". Harley revisits Ivy's grave, where Frank and Kite Man tell her the crew is going to be publicly executed, so she surrenders herself in exchange for their lives. Once her crew is safe, Harley tries to kill the Joker, but he overpowers her. Instead of killing her, he decides to drop her in acid that will render her "normal". At the last minute, a resurrected Ivy saves Harley and drops the Joker in the acid, though not before he destroys his tower and sets off an earthquake, destroying Gotham. Batman saves Harley and Ivy before disappearing in the debris. Reunited, the crew reflect on everything that has happened amidst Gotham's ruins while a "normal" Joker emerges from the rubble laughing.

=== Season 2 (2020) ===
No. overall	No. in season	Title	Directed by	Written by	Original release date
14	1	"New Gotham"	Vinton Heuck	Adam Stein	April 3, 2020
Weeks after the Joker's defeat and Batman's disappearance, the President has declared the destroyed Gotham a no man's land and exiled it from the U.S. while Harley and her crew revel in the resulting chaos. The GCPD's surviving officers, with the exception of Gordon, have become outnumbered and unmotivated to restore law and order as various sections of the city have been taken over by the Penguin, the Riddler, Bane, Two-Face, and Mr. Freeze, who have formed the Injustice League following the Legion of Doom's destruction. Harley disapproves of their control, especially after they give her a small piece of territory to rule. She attempts to rebel against them, only to get herself captured. Months later, Ivy and the rest of the crew manage to break her out. After killing the Penguin, Harley sets out to seek revenge against the Injustice League. Meanwhile, paramedics find an unconscious Bruce Wayne among the rubble.
15	2	"Riddler U" (Note: Originally titled "Riddle U" when the episode first aired.)	Colin Heck	Sabreena Jalees	April 10, 2020
After learning that the Riddler has power and clean water, Harley, Ivy, and Clayface make plans to infiltrate his stronghold, "Riddler University", while King Shark and Doctor Psycho venture through Two-Face and Bane's territories to secure a water filter. Harley nearly blows her cover in front of the tour guide, Barbara Gordon, so she and Ivy intend to kill her before she can warn the Riddler. However, Barbara tells them she wants to stop the Riddler after deducing he was responsible for kidnapping students and that she procured invitations for a party at a fraternity house where the disappearances occurred. Harley and Ivy steal the invitations for themselves and Clayface and successfully enter the party, where they learn that the kidnapped students are being used as human batteries to power a water and electric system. The Riddler captures them, but they are rescued by Barbara, who became inspired by her father, Commissioner Gordon, and Batman, to successfully stop Riddler herself. Instead of killing the Riddler, Harley, Ivy, and Clayface use him to power the mall while Barbara becomes Batgirl.
16	3	"Catwoman" (Note: Originally titled "Trapped" when the episode first aired.)	Brandon McKinney	Sarah Peters	April 17, 2020
After a failed attempt to infiltrate Mr. Freeze's lair, Harley and her crew decide to steal Firefly's flamethrower from Doctor Trap's museum in order to melt their way in. Harley and Ivy recruit Kite Man and Catwoman to help them while the others have to locate the Riddler after he manipulated Psycho into facilitating his escape. During the theft, Ivy starts to question the direction her life is going and finds herself under even more pressure when Kite Man steals a ring from the museum and proposes to her. To make matters worse, Catwoman betrays them and escapes on her own, leaving them to die until they manage to escape by using the flamethrower. After beating Doctor Trap and heading home, Harley and Ivy help the rest of the crew recapture the Riddler, who decides to keep powering the mall for the time being. Afterward, Harley convinces Ivy that she does not have to feel ashamed about letting her past go, so Ivy insists Kite Man to pop the question again.
17	4	"Thawing Hearts"	Vinton Heuck	Tom Hyndman	April 24, 2020
Harley, Clayface, Psycho, and King Shark successfully use Firefly's flamethrower to storm Mr. Freeze's lair, only to get captured. Freeze explains his many failed attempts to save his ailing, frozen wife Nora Fries before trying to use Harley as a human lab rat, but she convinces Freeze to let her call Ivy, who she is certain can find a cure for Nora's illness. While they wait, Freeze invites them to lunch and relates his history with Nora. Due to her experience with Joker however, Harley believes he is lying and that Nora is his prisoner, so she uses Freeze's gun to thaw her out, only to learn she really is dying. An incensed Freeze threatens to kill everyone by detonating his lair unless Ivy finds a cure. Meanwhile, Ivy and Kite Man attempt to secure a wedding venue, but are forced to leave to save Harley and lose his preferred location to his nemesis, Condiment King. Ivy successfully creates a cure, but due to Nora's rare blood type, someone else has to take it, then give Nora a blood transfusion, which will kill them. Freeze volunteers and sacrifices himself for Nora, which Harley recognizes as an act of true love.
18	5	"Batman's Back, Man"	Juan Meza-Leon	Sarah Nevada Smith	May 1, 2020
As the only Injustice League members left, Two-Face and Bane decide to join forces to stand a better chance against Harley, but disagree on how to label their combined organization. Meanwhile, a recovering Bruce Wayne is desperate to pick up the cowl again in spite of his butler Alfred Pennyworth's advice to rest and heal. When he learns that Batgirl is fighting criminals, Bruce becomes concerned that she is giving Gotham a false sense of hope and that it will die if she dies, so he tasks Lucius Fox with building him a high-tech Batsuit to compensate for his injuries. Batman initially has the upper hand in battle, but he sustains more injuries while fighting Bane before he is saved from Two-Face's men by Alfred and Batgirl; the former having also adopted a vigilante persona, the Macaroni. Understanding the value of having Batgirl around, Batman asks Commissioner Gordon to work with her while he focuses on recovering. Meanwhile, an upset Bane nearly kills Two-Face for leaving him out of their partnership, but the latter offers him a pit to do with as he wishes to placate him.
19	6	"All the Best Inmates Have Daddy Issues"	Juan Meza-Leon	Jamiesen Borak	May 8, 2020
While spending a night together, Harley and Ivy encounter a living, sane Joker. Ivy tries to kill him, but Harley believes he has genuinely changed. To prove this, she recounts how she first met Ivy and Joker and changed her for the better. In a flashback, Dr. Harleen Quinzel had been asked by D.A. Harvey Dent and Commissioner Gordon to interview Joker about a bomb he hid in Gotham before he was imprisoned at Arkham. After a difficult first meeting, Harleen becomes inspired by a spiteful Ivy to ask about Joker's family. He tells her a heartfelt backstory about his abusive father to earn her trust before telling her the bomb is in Little Italy in exchange for having a private meal with her. While Batman and the authorities are distracted, Joker reveals he put the bomb in the prison chef nicknamed "Little Italy" and tries to kidnap Harleen. However, Ivy rescues her in return for a plant Harleen gave her. Once Harley finishes reminiscing, Ivy reveals Joker's backstory was actually hers before they bring in Doctor Psycho, who confirms the Joker has no memory of his old self. On their way out, Harley and Ivy get captured by Two-Face.
20	7	"There's No Place to Go But Down"	Colin Heck	Adam Stein	May 15, 2020
Harley and Ivy are put on trial in a kangaroo court held by Two-Face, with Bane as the judge and Man-Bat as their defense attorney. Against Harley's wishes, Ivy admits her role in their recent actions, leading to both of them being sentenced to life imprisonment in Bane's subterranean rehabilitation center, the Pit. Despite seeing no way out, Harley and Ivy formulate a plan to escape after learning George Lopez is headlining the upcoming talent show. Despite their initial plan going south when Lopez leaves, Ivy gives an inspiring speech about her recent life events in front of the other inmates and incites a riot, giving her and Harley a chance to escape. When Bane attempts to stop them, Harley sacrifices herself to allow Ivy to escape, but the latter saves the former and they share a passionate kiss. Meanwhile, Gordon's self-confidence takes another hit after he fails to stop the Ratcatcher. When Two-Face storms his house, he plans to give up until Batgirl saves him and reveals her identity to him. With Gordon's confidence restored, the pair team up to take back the GCPD headquarters, with Gordon defeating and incarcerating Two-Face.
21	8	"Inner (Para) Demons"	Tom Derosier	Tom Hyndman	May 22, 2020
With the Injustice League defeated, the President tasks Gordon with eliminating Harley before he can allow Gotham to rejoin the U.S. Batgirl tries to dissuade him, but Gordon rallies Gotham's citizens behind him to help. Meanwhile, Harley is struggling to reconcile her feelings over kissing Ivy. When Batgirl warns her of Gordon's plans, Harley decides to take over Gotham with an army. Together with an enthusiastic Psycho and a reluctant Clayface and King Shark, Harley steals Mister Miracle's Mother Box and uses it to travel to Apokolips, where she kills Granny Goodness with Psycho's help; earning Darkseid's respect and a Parademon army. Elsewhere, Ivy and Kite Man have brunch with his parents. When she learns they only want metahuman grandchildren however, Ivy tells them off and convinces Kite Man to do the same. Gordon's army confronts Harley's, only to be slaughtered until Ivy arrives and makes Harley realize she went too far. Harley relinquishes control of the Parademons and lets Gordon win, enraging Psycho into quitting the crew. When Harley tries to tell Ivy her feelings, Kite Man interrupts them, causing her to hide them once more.
22	9	"Bachelorette"	Christina Sotta	Sarah Peters	May 29, 2020
Harley, Ivy, Catwoman, Nora, and Jennifer, a friend from Ivy's past, travel to a Themysciran resort run by Eris for Ivy's bachelorette party. The girls enjoy themselves until Harley and Ivy get drunk and have sex. Ashamed, the latter vows to stay in her room for the rest of the weekend until the former lures her out after learning Eris hypnotized Queen Hippolyta to make her sell the island to LexCorp. The girls thwart a scheme, freeing Hippolyta and celebrating their victory with more alcohol, leading to Harley and Ivy unwittingly having sex again. Meanwhile, Kite Man has his bachelor party with Clayface, Frank, and King Shark until King Shark is called back to his home by his father, the Shark God, for an arranged marriage to Tabitha of the Hammerhead Clan to keep their clans from going to war. Though King Shark stands up to his father, he gets married anyway, but secretly agrees with Tabitha to an open marriage since there is no real love between them. When they return from Themyscira, Ivy chooses to stay with Kite Man, stating that she loves and trusts Harley with her life, but not her heart; leaving Harley distraught.
23	10	"Dye Hard"	Vinton Hueck	Jamiesen Borak	June 5, 2020
In an attempt to cope with Ivy rejecting her, Harley goes to a bar at Wayne Tower, only to find the amnesiac Joker working there. Suddenly, a group of thugs attack, holding the customers hostage and handcuffing the former lovers together. While escaping, the pair discover the thugs were a distraction so a newly muscular Riddler, who escaped from the mall again, could sneak in and steal a mind control helmet. Joined by Gordon, King Shark, Clayface, and Borgman, Harley and Joker quickly discover that Riddler is working with Psycho, who has sworn revenge on Harley for under-appreciating him, before he uses the helmet to enslave the remaining Parademons as well as Clayface and King Shark. Borgman gives his eye to Harley as a memento before sacrificing himself to help her, Gordon, and Joker escape. After realizing they need to free the Justice League from the Book of Fables, Joker mentions having several dreams about his past life, including the book, but he struggles to remember where it is. To jog his memory, Harley reluctantly brings him to Ace Chemicals and pushes him into a vat of acid to turn him back into the Joker.
24	11	"A Fight Worth Fighting For"	Tom Derosier	Tom Hyndman	June 12, 2020
Emerging from the acid, Joker remembers starting a relationship with a nurse named Bethany after she found him and nursed him back to health six months prior. Under threat of a bomb Harley put in his head, Joker takes her to Bethany's house to get the Book of Fables. However, he enrages Bethany into tossing the book, which is subsequently grabbed by a Parademon. As Harley and Joker attempt to retrieve the book, he reflects on his relationship with Bethany and realizes he found true love while she does the same in regards to Ivy. After retrieving the book, the pair are rescued by Batman and explain the situation to him, only to realize the book is not the Book of Fables. Concurrently, Darkseid orders Psycho to kill Harley while Ivy and Kite Man try to prepare for their wedding. After Ivy's dress is damaged, she confronts Psycho, but he brainwashes her. Returning to Bethany's house, Joker reconciles with her before Batman calls Zatanna to free the Justice League. Joker decides to resume his criminal lifestyle while maintaining his relationship with Bethany, and Harley decides to confess her feelings to Ivy just as Ivy arrives to kill her.
25	12	"Lovers' Quarrel"	Christina Sotta	Adam Stein	June 19, 2020
Kite Man rescues Harley and takes her to his apartment, where they use Borgman's eye to upload a digital version of him to Kite Man's electronics so he can help them build anti-mind control devices. Meanwhile, the Justice League defeat the Parademons, prompting Psycho to dispatch Ivy, Clayface, and King Shark to fight them after an impatient Darkseid arrives on Earth and threatens to kill him if he does not kill Harley soon. Though the League prevails again, Psycho has Ivy use her pheromones on them before bringing Harley back to the mall. Kite Man follows them and gives Harley a device before trying to free Ivy with true love's kiss, to no avail. Psycho forces Ivy and Harley to fight, but Harley kisses Ivy, distracting Psycho long enough to free Ivy so Harley can give her an anti-mind control device. Together, they defeat Psycho and impress Darkseid, who offers Harley his army and the Earth. She declines as she does not want to be a supervillain anymore. Once Darkseid leaves, Psycho uses the last of his strength to broadcast Ivy's memories of having sex with Harley to all of Gotham, leaving Kite Man bewildered and heartbroken.
26	13	"Something Borrowed, Something Green" (Note: Originally titled "The Runaway Bridesmaid" when the episode first aired.)	Tom Derosier; Juan Meza-Leon	Sarah Peters	June 26, 2020
Ivy convinces Kite Man to go through with the wedding after revealing she secured the venue he wanted. Meanwhile, on their way to Arkham and after listening to Gordon rant about not earning any recognition for saving Gotham, Two-Face convinces him to arrest all of the attending villains at the wedding so Gordon can earn public recognition and eventually run for mayor. Harley, having also been imprisoned at Arkham, refuses her crew's offer to break her out to attend the wedding, but changes her mind after learning of Gordon's plan from Two-Face, and teams up with him to escape. While trying to identify Gordon, she attacks the wrong person and enrages Ivy, who asks her to leave. Despite this, Harley foils Gordon when he gasses everyone in attendance, though she causes the wedding to turn into an all-out war between the villains and the GCPD. A frustrated Kite Man breaks up with Ivy, having come to realize that she only agreed to marry him to deny her feelings for Harley. Harley and Ivy escape from Gordon together, sharing a kiss as they drive off into the sunset.

=== Season 3 (2022) ===
No. overall	No. in season	Title	Directed by	Written by	Original release date
27	1	"Harlivy"	Juan Meza-Leon	Sarah Peters	July 28, 2022
Two weeks after confessing their love for each other and escaping from Gordon, Harley and Ivy fly around the world on their unofficial honeymoon, "The Eat, Bang, Kill Tour". Harley is overly excited about them being a couple while Ivy awkwardly tries to adjust to their relationship. While visiting "Edin", a botanical paradise that Ivy created years ago, they learn that Gordon has caught King Shark and Clayface to lure them out. As they return to Gotham to break them out of Arkham, Harley bumps into Amanda Waller, who claims that Ivy has not done anything villainous in years. To prove her wrong, Harley kidnaps her and brings her to Edin. Suicide Squad member Plastique arrives and fights Harley and Ivy, destroying Edin in the process before eventually killing herself while Waller escapes. Harley apologizes to Ivy for the damage and offers her help in Ivy's long desired plan to terraform the world. Meanwhile, Clayface auditions for James Gunn's new biopic about Thomas Wayne and gets a set job as the "director's chair". Concurrently, Gordon's mayoral campaign falters despite help from Two-Face until the sitting mayor is maimed by a bizarre series of accidents.
28	2	"There's No Ivy in Team"	Joonki Park	Adam Stein	July 28, 2022
After Harley and Ivy reunite with their crew, Ivy shares her plan to transform Gotham City into an Eden-like paradise. Their first step is to get amber containing prehistoric mosquitoes with the DNA of prehistoric plants from Gotham's Natural History Museum. Harley lets Ivy lead the crew this time, but she proves to be a terrible leader. After failing to create a serum from the DNA capable of bringing plants to life, Ivy chooses to work alone. Meanwhile, Nightwing returns to Gotham as well, but struggles to cooperate with the rest of the Bat Family. Harley and Batgirl bring their respective teams to a newly opened escape room to foster camaraderie, but the room turns out to be a death trap set up by the Riddler. To get out alive, they all need to work together, during which Ivy and Nightwing both learn to evaluate teamwork. After successfully escaping, Ivy tries to create the serum again, but her experiment destroys the crew's lair and causes Frank to grow legs and gain telekinesis.
29	3	"The 83rd Annual Villy Awards"	Mike Milo	Jamiesen Borak	July 28, 2022
Following their lair's destruction, the crew moves into Catwoman's old apartment. Harley learns that she and Ivy have been nominated for "Best Couple" at the 83rd Annual Villy Awards, which she had always won with Joker. Despite not liking the award ceremony, Ivy accompanies Harley, but becomes more uncomfortable when she learns that they are seated next to Kite Man and his new girlfriend Golden Glider. Meanwhile, Clayface impersonates Gunn to meet Billy Bob Thornton, who is playing Thomas Wayne in the new film. Thornton comes to appreciate Clayface's acting skills and shapeshifting abilities, but is accidentally killed by Catwoman's tiger, so Clayface takes his place in the film. At the ceremony, Harley tries to peek at the winners' list by fighting the android guarding it while Ivy bonds with Glider over their social anxiety. After their talk, Ivy realizes she should have been more supportive of Harley, who with Kite Man's help, realizes that Ivy's love is an award in itself. They leave the ceremony, despite turning out to be the winners, so Joker takes their award for himself.
30	4	"A Thief, a Mole, an Orgy"	Juan Meza-Leon	Tom Hyndman	August 4, 2022
Harley, King Shark, and Clayface unknowingly distract Ivy from working on her terraforming serum. To avoid conflict, she chooses to lie about what rules Catwoman adheres to in her apartment. In retaliation, Harley destroys the security cameras, but this proves to be a hindrance after Frank is kidnapped. Upon investigation, they find an owl-shaped badge, which Harley recognizes as the Court of Owls' symbol. With the Joker's help, Harley and Ivy infiltrate the Court, only to learn that it is an orgy club. As they search for Frank, Harley finds out that Ivy lied about Catwoman's rules and that the two of them had an affair years ago, which deeply upsets her. Meanwhile, Gordon also infiltrates the Court to gain funding from the elites for his mayoral campaign. Despite his unsuccessful attempt, Two-Face suggests that he use the knowledge of the orgy and pictures of the guests, such as Bruce Wayne, for his benefit. Ivy explains her history with Catwoman to Harley, detailing the emotional damage the relationship caused her and how Harley changed that when they got together. After they make up, they realize they forgot about Frank, who wakes up in an unknown laboratory.
31	5	"It's a Swamp Thing"	Vinton Hueck	Rachel Pegram	August 11, 2022
Ivy is unable to locate Frank through the "Green", the collective plant consciousness, so Harley suggests they take a break to clear her head. Accompanying Nora to New Orleans, they beat John Constantine in a shot contest before visiting Swamp Thing, a former associate of Ivy's who has a stronger connection to the Green. Nora spends the night with him, but when she claims that she is not looking for anything serious, Swamp Thing becomes enraged and attacks them. Ivy calms him down by opening up about her fear of losing Frank and reconciling with him. While Nora gives Swamp Thing a chance, Ivy's emotional breakthrough helps her strengthen her connection to the Green and learn that Bruce is holding Frank captive at Wayne Enterprises. Meanwhile, Bruce and Selina Kyle struggle with their new relationship due to their different needs, so Alfred asks the Music Meister to act as their therapist, forcing them to sing about their feelings. With the therapy not availing, Bruce decides to focus on stopping Ivy's plan to distract himself from his love life.
32	6	"Joker: The Killing Vote"	Joonki Park	Conner Shin	August 18, 2022
After learning that his stepchildren did not get into a Spanish education program at their school due to political reasons, the Joker decides to run for Mayor of Gotham to fix the city's problems. His mayoral campaign soon wins public favor, unlike Gordon's, who lacks any real policies. To guarantee he wins, Gordon reluctantly agrees to follow Two-Face's unethical methods, but loses Barbara's support as a result. Two-Face kidnaps the Joker's stepson Benicio and threatens his life unless the Joker drops out of the election. Joker surrenders, but Two-Face traps him and Benicio on a deadly rollercoaster, revealing that he only supported Gordon to become district attorney again and that he poisoned the sitting mayor. Upon learning of this, Gordon saves Joker and Benicio and almost kills Two-Face until Joker reminds him of the error of his ways. Realizing the Joker has truly changed for the better, Gordon drops out of the election, only to learn he will become jobless after Joker announces his plans to dismantle the GCPD. As Harley and Ivy return from New Orleans, they are shocked to discover the Joker has become the new Mayor of Gotham.
33	7	"Another Sharkley Adventure"	Cecillia Aranovich; Jennifer Coyle; Mike Milo	Sarah Nevada Smith	August 25, 2022
While Ivy recovers from the side effects of using the Green, Harley volunteers to kidnap Bruce to find out where he is keeping Frank. She sneaks into a charity gala Bruce is hosting at Wayne Tower, but Batgirl tries to stop her despite genuinely wanting to be friends with Harley. After a short fight, they both get captured by the Mad Hatter, who wants to kill them, Batgirl especially for interfering with his plans to mind-control Gotham's citizens. Harley talks her way out of captivity, but feels guilty for leaving Batgirl behind and eventually goes back to save her, killing Mad Hatter in the process. Meanwhile, King Shark returns home for his father's funeral, only to learn that his newly crowned brother Prince Shark plans to sell the Shark Kingdom to their arch-enemy Ocean Master. After failing to change his mind, they get into a violent fight, ending with King Shark unintentionally killing Prince. Back at Catwoman's apartment, Ivy appears fully recovered while Harley returns with the kidnapped Bruce.
34	8	"Batman Begins Forever"	Vinton Hueck	Jamiesen Borak	September 1, 2022
Bruce refuses to reveal where Frank is, so the crew asks Doctor Psycho to help them enter his mind. There, they find themselves in a repressed memory where Bruce's childhood trauma of Joe Chill murdering his parents constantly repeats itself. Harley interferes with the memory by helping the young Bruce escape, causing Ivy, Psycho, and Clayface to wake up while Bruce's consciousness keeps Harley with him. As they find the rest of Bruce's memories, she discovers how he became Batman and comes to respect his heroism. After Chill returns to confront young Bruce, Harley helps the latter think of a memory where he feels safe, transporting them to Bruce's last Christmas with his family. In return, he reveals that he modified Frank's powers to bring his parents back to life while Chill is revealed to be an adult Bruce who embodies his guilt over their death. Harley wakes up at Wayne Manor, having been captured by the Bat Family alongside her crew. She fails to convince Bruce to work through his trauma instead of undoing it, and he begins to resurrect his parents.
35	9	"Climax at Jazzapajizza"	Juan Meza-Leon	Tom Hyndman	September 8, 2022
With Frank's powers, Bruce unknowingly awakens every corpse in Gotham, resulting in a plant-based zombie apocalypse. While he is distracted with the return of his zombie parents, Harley, Batgirl, and Nightwing work together to stop the apocalypse. Ivy is able to control the zombies through the Green, but realizes she can use them to terraform the city and does so, turning the citizens into living plants with the zombies' vomit. At Wayne Manor, King Shark helps Bruce realize his mistakes and reconcile with his parents' death while Ivy announces her plan to Gotham at the Jazzapajizza jazz festival. Seeing how dangerous her plan is, Harley tries to talk Ivy down, but cannot bring herself to hurt her feelings after Ivy expresses how much Harley's support meant to her. However, when Harley is infected by a zombie while saving Bane, Ivy is forced to reverse everything to save her life. Though happy for Harley's safety, she becomes embittered about sacrificing her dream.
36	10	"The Horse and the Sparrow"	Joonki Park	Sarah Nevada Smith	September 15, 2022
Ivy is approached by Luthor with an offer to lead the Legion of Doom while Harley is hailed as a hero for saving the citizens. The crew attends the premiere of the Thomas Wayne biopic where Ivy plans to kill Mayor Joker as a part of Luthor's offer. Harley wants to help her, but after seeing Bruce's need for emotional support due to the film, she comforts him instead while Ivy talks to Joker about her relationship with Harley. Realizing Harley does not want to be a villain anymore, Ivy urges her to accept it, but Harley admits her fear of losing Ivy if she does so. While Ivy reassures Harley that she will love and support her no matter what, the film ends with a huge success, though no one believes that Clayface impersonated Thornton, much to his chagrin. Joker announces Bruce's arrest by the new GCPD for endangering Gotham and evading taxes. Bruce willingly faces the consequences of his actions and asks Barbara to lead the Bat Family in his absence. Harley continues to be his therapist and joins the Bat Family as its newest member.

=== Special (2023) ===
No. overall	Title	Directed by	Written by	Original release date
37	"A Very Problematic Valentine's Day Special"	Jennifer Coyle; Cecilia Aranovich Hamilton	Dean Lorey and Justin Halpern & Patrick Schumacker	February 9, 2023
While celebrating Valentine's Day for the first time as a couple, Harley uses the Lasso of Truth on Ivy to learn if this is her best Valentine's Day. When she admits it is not, Harley visits Etrigan's sex shop and buys a magic spell that will increase users' sexual arousal. After using it on Ivy while they are having sex, Ivy's subsequent orgasm causes her to involuntarily spread her pheromones across Gotham, causing its citizens to have sex uncontrollably. Meanwhile, Bane meets a dominatrix named Betty and buys a penis-enlarging potion from Etrigan to impress her, but it reacts adversely to his growth hormones, growing him to kaiju-size before going on a sex-addled rampage due to Ivy's pheromones. Harley and Ivy stop him by asking Clayface to transform into a giant version of Brett Goldstein and discuss Bane's turn-offs. Afterward, Betty agrees to go out with Bane while Harley apologizes to Ivy for not listening to what she wanted. Ivy reveals her best Valentine's Day was the night when she and Harley first met because Harley made her feel special for the first time in her life.

=== Season 4 (2023) ===
No. overall	No. in season	Title	Directed by	Written by	Original release date
38	1	"Gotham's Hottest Hotties"	Vinton Heuck	Tom Hyndman	July 27, 2023
On her first day as the Legion of Doom's new CEO, Ivy struggles to gain her employees' respect, so she approves all their evil plans to get them to like her. This backfires when Bane blows up an oil rig, causing chemical pollution in the sea, which Ivy originally wanted to prevent. After some encouragement from Nora and a brawl with Snowflame, Ivy stands up to the Legionnaires and hires Nora as her assistant. Meanwhile, a serial killer is targeting Gotham's hottest people, so Harley investigates with the Bat Family and eventually realizes Professor Pyg committed the murders to create a perfect henchman from the victims' best body parts. Using Nightwing as bait, the Bat Family captures Pyg, but Harley goes overboard and kills him, much to their horror. Concurrently, King Shark's wife Tabitha is expecting babies while Talia al Ghul decides to travel to Gotham after hearing about Wayne Enterprises' financial problems.
39	2	"B.I.T.C.H."	Joonki Park	Ava Tramer	July 27, 2023
Ivy attends a networking event for evil businesswomen, where she meets Talia, but learns through Harley that she is also a conservator of Wayne Enterprises. Talia advises on Ivy's plan about how to legally replace Gotham's male trees with female trees, unknowingly helping her ruin Wayne Pharmaceuticals in the process, which was Ivy's real plan. Despite initial tension, the two develop a mutual respect for each other's intellect and refined views on villainy. Meanwhile, as punishment for breaking the Bat Family's "No killing" rule, Harley is demoted to Alfred's assistant. He teaches her a technique called B.I.T.C.H. ("Breathe; Identify the Problem; Tea Break; Consider Your Options; Handle It"), which she ultimately finds useful in decisive thinking, especially after she witnesses Alfred trying to rob a bank. She stops him in front of the Bat Family, gaining their respect and earning her own Bat outfit while Alfred is arrested. Hoping his scheme will reunite him with Bruce in Blackgate Penitentiary, he is surprised to learn that he is being sent to Arkham instead for rehabilitation.
40	3	"Icons Only"	Michael Moloney	Sarah Nevada Smith	July 27, 2023
Harley and Ivy travel to Las Vegas to spend some quality time together while also planning to watch Clayface's new show, only to learn all the tickets are sold out. Harley realizes her hero reputation makes her a pariah in the villain community, but after seeing that Bruce can be a DJ in prison due to his public identity, she decides to create one for herself as well named Hargret. She enjoys her time with Ivy as Hargret until Clayface foils their attempt to steal tickets for his show as revenge for Ivy not keeping in touch with him lately, resulting in a fight between the two, which is interrupted by Tabitha going into labor. After giving birth to nine shark babies, she agrees to co-parent with King Shark, who chooses Harley and Ivy to be the children's godparents. Afterward, Ivy admits she had feared losing common interests with Harley due to their different jobs while Harley announces that she will be moving in with the Bat Family to learn more about her hero self. Though she is saddened to hear this, Ivy fully supports Harley's decision.
41	4	"The First Person to Come Back from a Business Conference Without Chlamydia" (Note: Originally announced as "Business Conference Without Chlamydia" before the episode aired.)	Vinton Heuck	Jimmy Mosqueda	August 3, 2023
Ivy goes to MalCon, a supervillain convention on the Moon, where she expects to hold a panel, but Luthor only wants her to give an opening speech for his presentation. On Talia's advice, she decides to build new business connections anyway, impressing many villains in the process with her ideas, including Steppenwolf. As Luthor holds his presentation, he realizes everyone is more interested in Ivy than him, which frustrates him into calling off the convention by destroying his lunar base. Meanwhile, due to Talia cutting the Bat Family's budget, Harley teaches them how to fight without weapons and rents out Wayne Manor to Scandinavian tourists to make more money. Upon discovering the Scandinavians want to rob the manor, they successfully use Harley's teachings to stop them. After Harley sells some of Ivy's belongings on the Internet, exploiting her newfound fame, the Bat Family can repurchase their equipment. As they check on the Batcave's security footage, they miss the feed displaying Harley sleepwalking and wreaking havoc in the manor during the night.
42	5	"Getting Ice Dick, Don't Wait Up"	Joonki Park	Jen Chuck	August 10, 2023
Harley undergoes LASIK surgery carried out by Supergirl to improve her efficiency in night missions. She calls Barbara to pick her up but is instead met by her roommate Alysia Yeoh, who found Barbara's phone. Nightwing informs Harley that Barbara went missing, but refuses to let Harley help find her due to his mistrust of her. Meanwhile, Luthor assigns his PR team, the Jons, to manage Ivy's career, and they convince her to boost her social media activity to gain more followers. As a result, Ivy begins to neglect her relationship with Harley and her mentees Terra, Volcana, and Tefé Holland. Harley locates Barbara in the mountains and goes there with Alysia to save her, only to learn that Barbara went there to bring her mother home from their family cabin after Gordon rushed back to Gotham to accept a security job at the Legion of Doom. Harley bemoans that she gave up everything from her previous life to join the Bat Family, yet still does not feel accepted, though Barbara assures her that it takes time. Later, they find Nightwing's dead body, which shocks them both.
43	6	"Metamorphosis"	Michael Moloney	Conner Shin	August 17, 2023
Following Nightwing's funeral, Harley, Batgirl, and Robin split up, reducing the chances of them being killed as well. Returning to Catwoman's apartment, Harley learns about her sleepwalking from Frank after he witnesses it. Lucius locates Nightwing's tracker at the Legion of Doom's headquarters, leading Barbara to conclude that Ivy is behind the murder, which Harley refuses to believe. The tracker is later revealed to have been found by Gordon in a parking garage but has become untraceable for further investigation. Meanwhile, Ivy realizes the Jons are manipulating her public image, so she decides to take them down with Terra, Volcana, and Tefé's help. She acts publicly disturbing at a children's beauty pageant she is hosting, purposely angering the Jons, who then morph into one giant individual and try to destroy Ivy. Using their abilities combined, Ivy and her mentees defeat and kill the Jons. Afterward, the Joker arrives at the Legion of Doom, announcing his return to villainy and claiming that he is Nightwing's killer, much to Barbara's anger. While the Legionnaires celebrate him, a shocked Harley notices an alternate version of herself winking at her from the crowd.
44	7	"The Most Culturally Impactful Film Franchise of All Time" (Note: Originally announced as "Most Culturally Impactful Film Franchise" before the episode aired.)	Brandon McKinney	Alexis Quasarano	August 24, 2023
After investigating the Joker's whereabouts on the night of Nightwing's murder, Batgirl finds proof that he is lying about being his killer and exposes him. Meanwhile, Harley tries to talk to Ivy about her mental problems, but she is busy stealing the Legion of Super-Heroes' time sphere. Frustrated, Harley uses the time sphere so they can visit their future selves for advice, only to arrive to an apocalyptic Gotham in the year 2048. A group of survivors explain to them that a mysterious force caused Gotham's destruction in 2024, killing many residents including Harley and Ivy, and led to an adult Robin taking over the city. Harley and Ivy meet their future daughter, named after Neytiri, but she sells them out to Robin, revealing they were bad parents and a bad couple due to their lack of communication, which makes Harley and Ivy reevaluate their relationship. One of King Shark's adult children helps them escape and urges them to change this future before sending them back to their time. However, they arrive at the present six days after the apocalypse has already started.
45	8	"Il Buffone"	Yori Mochizuki	Ava Tramer	August 31, 2023
Bane travels to Italy to prove himself to Nora by fixing Ivy's broken pasta maker but learns that the model is discontinued. In desperation, he seeks out an elderly Italian woman, who teaches him how to make pasta with his own hands and helps him overcome his insecurity. In return, he gets her tickets to Clayface's show as she is a big fan. Meanwhile, Luthor plans to thicken the ozone layer, but when the laser he used on the Moon proves to be too short to reach Earth's atmosphere, he decides to avail Volcana's powers. Disgusted, Nora refuses to let this happen, so Luthor traps her, Volcana, King Shark, and Captain Cold inside the Legion of Doom's headquarters. When he attempts to gas the building to force them out, they create an explosion to escape. However, the heat magnifies the atmosphere enough that Luthor can use his laser and block out the Sun. Consequently, Gotham's society crumbles into chaos in six days. When Harley and Ivy return from the future, the time sphere gets destroyed, and they realize that Luthor's goal was to render Superman powerless.
46	9	"Potato Based Cloning Incident"	Chad Hurd	Sarah Nevada Smith	September 7, 2023
Harley and Ivy discover that Harley has a clone, unknowingly created by Gordon with the Legion of Doom's cloning device. Being more of a rule follower, she suggests Ivy use her LexCorp board membership to vote Luthor out so they can legally turn off his ozone laser. To secure the last vote, Ivy organizes a golf tournament to sway an influential board member but accidentally kills him. Nonetheless, his wife votes against Luthor because Harley had previously saved her life, allowing Ivy to shut down Luthor's machine. Meanwhile, Clone Harley reveals she witnessed Harley killing Nightwing during one of her sleepwalking episodes, which Psycho confirms by entering Harley's memory, though she asks the Flash to turn back time five minutes to prevent him from knowing it. Clone Harley intends to arrest Harley as she did with other people whom she considered criminals for even minor mistakes, leading Harley to fight and destroy her clone. Ashamed of her actions and realizing her failure as a hero, Harley announces to Batgirl she is quitting the Bat Family before the Joker shoots Batgirl.
47	10	"Killer's Block"	Joonki Park	Sarah Peters	September 14, 2023
Harley questions her moral compass when she cannot bring herself to kill the Joker for paralyzing Batgirl. She later joins Ivy on the Moon for Luthor's birthday party where Ivy plans to kill Luthor, but they learn that he captured a weakened Superman and obtained his powers. Unable to defeat him and realizing her business partners are not interested in making a change, Ivy quits her job and teams up with Harley to destroy their businesses. With Batgirl's computer skills, they hack the ozone laser and blow up LexCorp, Wayne Enterprises, Veronica Cale's company, and the Legion of Doom while Steppenwolf sends Luthor to Apokolips as punishment. Harley also saves Superman before the Moon cracks, having finally accepted both her good and bad qualities. Three days later, with Superman regaining his powers and the Moon restored, Bruce is released from prison and becomes Batman again while Harley and Ivy form a new team with Barbara and Catwoman called the Gotham City Sirens. Having discovered that Nightwing's grave had been robbed, they decide to investigate the case, unaware that Talia took the corpse and resurrected Nightwing in a Lazarus Pit. Note : The episode was dedicated to Arleen Sorkin, the original voice of and inspiration for Harley Quinn, who died during the season's run.

=== Season 5 (2025) ===
No. overall	No. in season	Title	Directed by	Written by	Original release date
48	1	"The Big Apricot"	Diana Huh	Jamiesen Borak	January 16, 2025
Harley and Ivy spend a year doing lazy daily routines after the split-up of the Gotham City Sirens due to the teammates' inability to work together. Learning of the unveiling of a new Superman museum in Metropolis, Harley suggests they go there so she can receive Superman's gratitude for saving him previously. At the opening gala, they meet Bruce and his new girlfriend, Lena Luthor, and plan to steal the museum's most valuable artifact, Superman's first cape. They fail due to Metropolis' new Automaton Security System, but their spectacular gymnastic heist earns them recognition among the citizens. Lena offers Ivy to lead the Metropolis Green Initiative, while Harley convinces Superman, who feels useless lately, to take a vacation for self-discovery. Feeling they need a fresh start for their relationship, Harley and Ivy decide to move to Metropolis, while their recent activities in the city are being monitored by Brainiac.
49	2	"Back to School"	Christina Manrique	Leslie Schapira	January 23, 2025
King Shark arrives to Harley and Ivy's new apartment and asks them to babysit his children while he is on a date. Harley takes them to Vincent Edge's country club where a birthday party is held for Bane's adopted daughter Goldilocks, (Note: As depicted in Kite Man: Hell Yeah!.) but the shark babies' wild behavior damage the club. Vincent wants to ban Harley, but Lena appreciates her refreshing outspokenness as she defends the shark babies and allows her to join. Meanwhile, Ivy visits the Metropolis Botany Research Center, where she unpleasantly reunites with her old college professor and lover Dr. Jason Woodrue. Flashbacks reveal that Woodrue wanted to use Pamela Isley's experimental serum that can combine plant and human DNA for enrichment reasons. By trying to steal the test subject baby Frank, he caused a dangerous accident in the lab and locked Pamela inside to die, forcing her to use the serum on herself to save her life. Ivy takes revenge on Woodrue by trapping him in a lab with the same circumstances she faced and leaving him to die. Despite feeling a bit guilty, she does not tell Harley about it, unaware that Woodrue survived and turned himself into a plant–human hybrid.
50	3	"Floronic Man"	Joonki Park	Vidhya Iyer	January 30, 2025
Clayface's new one-man show receives negative reviews from the Daily Planet, so he seeks out its editor-in-chief Perry White and asks him to rewrite it. When Perry refuses, Clayface kidnaps him and tries to rewrite it himself, but his lack of writing skills prompts him to ask for Bane's help. Impressed by his review, Clayface decides to impersonate Perry and hires Bane as a lead columnist for the Daily Planet, assigning him to work with Lois Lane. Meanwhile, Harley learns about what happened to Woodrue from the news and confronts Ivy for not telling her. Wanting to avoid the conversation, Ivy goes to the Green, where Woodrue, now calling himself the "Floronic Man", appears via his new plant-based powers and tries to kill her. Harley has Frank to go to the Green and help Ivy while she locates Woodrue's unconscious body and kills him with a chainsaw. Ivy apologizes to Harley for not being honest about her problems before the two are captured by Automaton Security Robots and are taken to Brainiac's Skull Ship.
51	4	"Breaking Brainiac"	Diana Huh	Katie Rich	February 6, 2025
Years ago on planet Colu, Brainiac, known as Vril Dox, was an information and technology collector of other worlds for the Coluian government with a wife and son. Having been promoted to a position that no longer required traveling, his last mission was to obtain a shrinking weapon, the Hyper-Ray, from an uninhabited planet. After successfully returning home with the Hyper-Ray, he was devastated to find that Colu's entire population has been destroyed, including his family. Blaming himself for not calculating with the planet's minimal imperfections, he spent the next years traveling the galaxy, shrinking and collecting civilizations that he perfected. With Metropolis as his latest work, he finds Harley and Ivy's unpredictable nature too risky to deal with, so he decides to eliminate them. He is stopped by Lena, who is revealed to be working with Brainiac, and insists that she will keep Harley and Ivy in line if he lets them go. Brainiac agrees and returns them to Metropolis, erasing their memories about their captivity. However, while enjoying dinner with Ivy at home, Harley still feels the impact of their forgotten encounter with Brainiac.
52	5	"Big Pasta Dinner"	Christina Manrique	Jamiesen Borak	February 13, 2025
Bruce invites Harley and Ivy to a dinner party with other residents of his building, including Lois, Damian and the Joker's stepdaughter Sofia, whom the Joker accompanies. Harley and Ivy also bring along King Shark's son Shaun, whom they are babysitting. During dinner, Alfred is seemingly murdered by Harley, but Shaun says he saw in the dark that a skull-headed intruder put the murder knife in Harley's hand. The intruder soon reveals himself to be Red X, who is a resurrected Dick Grayson, wanting revenge on Harley for accidentally killing him. On the Joker's advice, Bruce apologizes to Damian and Dick for his aloofness, and Dick lets go of his anger towards Harley. Alfred reveals he is alive and that he hired Dick to kill Harley, Ivy and the Joker for their past villainous antics he got tired of cleaning up. Injecting himself with super-steroids, he turns into a monstrous version of the Macaroni, prompting the guests to work together to defeat him. After Alfred is arrested, Lois offers Harley an assistant job at the Daily Planet to help her uncover the source of the recent oddities in Metropolis.
53	6	"Bottle My Heart"	Joonki Park	Dean Lorey	February 20, 2025
While working at the Daily Planet, Harley discovers that Clayface is impersonating Perry and unintentionally provokes Lois to quit her job after refusing to accept a front-page story about her being Woodrue's killer. Concurrently, Brainiac ends his partnership with Lena due to their constant disagreement, angering Lena into seeking the Daily Planet and revealing Brainiac's plot to them while covering up her own part in it. Harley, Clayface and Bane decide to stage a musical to make the citizens aware of the situation without causing panic. The play dramatically tells Brainiac's backstory and his desire to make everything perfect, gaining him sympathy among the people, much to Lena's frustration. Brainiac also watches the play from his Skull Ship, making him realize his insanity and loneliness. At the end of the play, Frank is suddenly killed and Brainiac is pleased that Ivy now knows the pain of loss he felt for centuries.
54	7	"Frankette"	Diana Huh	Leslie Schapira	February 27, 2025
On Frank's funeral, a new baby plant named Frankette is born from the remains of Frank and the DNA of Ivy. Claiming that Brainiac killed Frank, Lena helps Harley and Ivy to get on his Skull Ship so they can avenge Frank. Harley and Ivy find a depressed Brainiac and learn that in his misery he programed the Automaton Security Robots to destroy Metropolis. They shrink him with the Hyper-Ray and intend to kill him, but Brainiac shows them footage that reveals Lena stabbed Frank to death. A vengeful Ivy goes to find her, but changes her plans to rescue Frankette after the Automatons attack them in a private school, where Bane also tries to protect Goldilocks. Unable to shut down the robots herself, Harley asks for Lena's help, who saves the city from destruction but asks for something in return. She later takes Frankette as her reward, inciting conflict between Harley and Ivy. Satisfied that her plan of breaking them up is working, she takes over Brainiac's Skull Ship and begins her reign over Metropolis.
55	8	"Family Feud"	Christina Manrique	Vidhya Iyer	March 6, 2025
Ivy chooses to go after Lena alone and breaks into her apartment to track her down using her teleporter. She deactivates Lena's home security android G.A.I.L. with the password Bruce gave her, only to learn that the teleporter has been destroyed. She finds and takes Lena's journal before escaping from the Automatons that Lena sent to kill her. Meanwhile, Harley receives a call from her father Nick that her mother Sharon died. Upon arriving at the Quinzel household, Nick captures Harley, revealing he lied to lure Harley over as Lena hired him to keep her away from Ivy. Harley breaks free as Lena's goons arrive to kill her, but she defeats them, though Nick is killed in the crossfire. His death makes Harley realize the importance of family, so she reunites with Ivy and the two reconcile. They find out from Lena's journal that her main motive is to surpass her brother Lex and gain his respect. Deducing Lex could be their only chance to stop Lena, they break him out of prison with Sharon's help. However, when they return to Metropolis, they discover that Lena has already shrunk and bottled the city.
56	9	"Bottle Episode (But Not a 'Bottle Episode')"	Joonki Park	Jamiesen Borak & Katie Rich	March 13, 2025
While panic erupts among the people in the shrunken Metropolis, Harley, Ivy and Sharon go to the Batcave to contact Bruce. He tells them about a prototype device called the Batradia that can send signals to satellites to pull Brainiac's Skull Ship down to Earth's atmosphere, where Harley and Ivy can reach it using the Batwing. Meanwhile, as the Automatons attack the citizens to find Lex at Lena's order, Bruce, Lois and the Joker form an alliance to try to call Superman. When the Batradia accidentally cuts down all communication systems in the city, Lois uses an old machine to send Morse code. Harley and Ivy confront Lena on the Skull Ship and bring Lex in so that he could reason with her. Using her psychological knowledge, Harley successfully reconciles the Luthor siblings, but they decide to rule the universe together and shrink Harley, Ivy and Sharon. Losing hope, a captured Harley breaks down in tears that she only wanted her life with Ivy to be perfect, which Brainiac empathizes with.
57	10	"The Mess Is the Point"	Diana Huh	Dean Lorey and Leslie Schapira	March 20, 2025
Harley ignites an argument between the Luthors as an attempt to stop them, resulting in Lena setting the Skull Ship to crash with planet Colu unless Lex apologizes to her. Harley, Ivy, Sharon and Brainiac break free, and the latter uses the Hyper-Ray to restore their original sizes and shrink the Luthors, who are then swallowed by Frankette. Inspired by Sharon's words that "the mess is the point" in life, Brainiac refuses to stop his ship from crashing, and instead makes peace with the loss of his family and embraces death. The others leave the ship in an escape pod and are later saved by Superman when the pod becomes damaged. One week later, Metropolis has returned to its original size and has been moved closer to Gotham. As friends of Harley and Ivy gather to celebrate, the couple reaffirm their love for each other before going into the night for new adventures.
