= Bottle Episode =

A bottle episode is a television episode that is produced specifically to be inexpensive and limited in scope.

Bottle Episode may refer to:

- "Bottle Episode" (The Simpsons), a 2024 episode of the American television series The Simpsons
- "Bottle Episode (But Not a 'Bottle Episode')", a 2025 episode of the American television series Harley Quinn
- "The Bottle Episode" (Supergirl), a 2020 episode of the American television series Supergirl
