= Katie Rich =

American comedian

- Education: Northwestern University
- Occupations: Comedian; writer; actress
- Spouse: Devlin Murdock (m. 2015)

Katie Rich is an American comedian, writer, producer and actress known for her work on Saturday Night Live.

== Early life ==
Rich was raised on the south side of Chicago, where she attended the grammar school St. Bede's, until her family moved to the suburb of Orland Park, Illinois. She graduated from Carl Sandburg High School and Northwestern University.

== Career ==
=== Early work ===
Rich began her career at Chicago's iO Theater, where she was part of a group called “Carl and the Passions.” During her time at iO, Rich also performed in a sketch show that she created with fellow comedian Kate Duffy called The Mary Kay Letourneau Players Present. She left iO to join The Second City, a comedy troupe with which she toured for three and a half years before moving to its mainstage cast. While in the mainstage cast, Rich performed in the show South Side of Heaven, among others.

=== Saturday Night Live ===
In December 2013, after auditioning for Lorne Michaels twice, Rich was hired to write for Saturday Night Live. She was also recommended for the job by SNL cast member Cecily Strong, a friend of Rich's who was her understudy during her time at The Second City. Rich was one of four writers who worked exclusively on SNL's Weekend Update segment.

On January 20, 2017, following Donald Trump's presidential inauguration, Rich tweeted about Trump's youngest son, 10-year-old Barron, saying he "will be this country's first homeschool shooter." NBC rapidly suspended Rich and had her name deleted from the Saturday Night Live closing credits. After widespread criticism, Rich deleted the tweet and deactivated her account, reactivating it on January 23 with an apology for what she called her "insensitive" and "inexcusable" comments. On January 26, 2017, Trump responded to Rich's tweet by calling Rich "terrible". Conversely, multiple comedians defended Rich and criticized NBC for suspending her.

On August 10, 2017, Rich returned to SNL as a writer on Weekend Update: Summer Edition. She left the show in 2019, after six years.

=== Films and television ===
Rich has appeared in the films The Ice Harvest (2005), Janie Jones (2010), and Bad Johnson (2014). She has also appeared in the Netflix show It’s Bruno and as various voices on Showtime’s Our Cartoon President. Rich has also written for many awards shows such as The ESPYS, NFL Honors, The Golden Globes, and The Emmys. She is also the co-creator and executive producer of the Netflix animated show Chicago Party Aunt. She served as a co-executive producer on the Harley Quinn spinoff, Kite Man: Hell Yeah!. She is currently an executive producer on season five of Harley Quinn.

=== Commercials ===
Rich has appeared in commercials for Discover Card and Walmart. She was also a part of the improvised Sonic Commercials. She is a copywriter who was the originator of the KFC campaign, "I Think I Ate The Bones."

== Awards ==
In 2015, she and her fellow Saturday Night Live writers were nominated for a Writers Guild of America Award for Comedy/Variety - Sketch Series. She has also been nominated for multiple Emmys for her work on SNL.

== Personal life ==
In July 2015, Rich married Devlin Murdock, who worked at the Museum of Science and Industry and later as a programs director for Recovery on Water, a rowing club for breast cancer survivors. As of at least September 2015, she divides her time between New York City and Chicago.

Rich has revealed that she has anxiety and panic disorder.

Rich met Mike Gordon from Phish at a Second City show and has done various projects with Gordon and the band.
