= Matt Oberg =

American actor (born 1976)

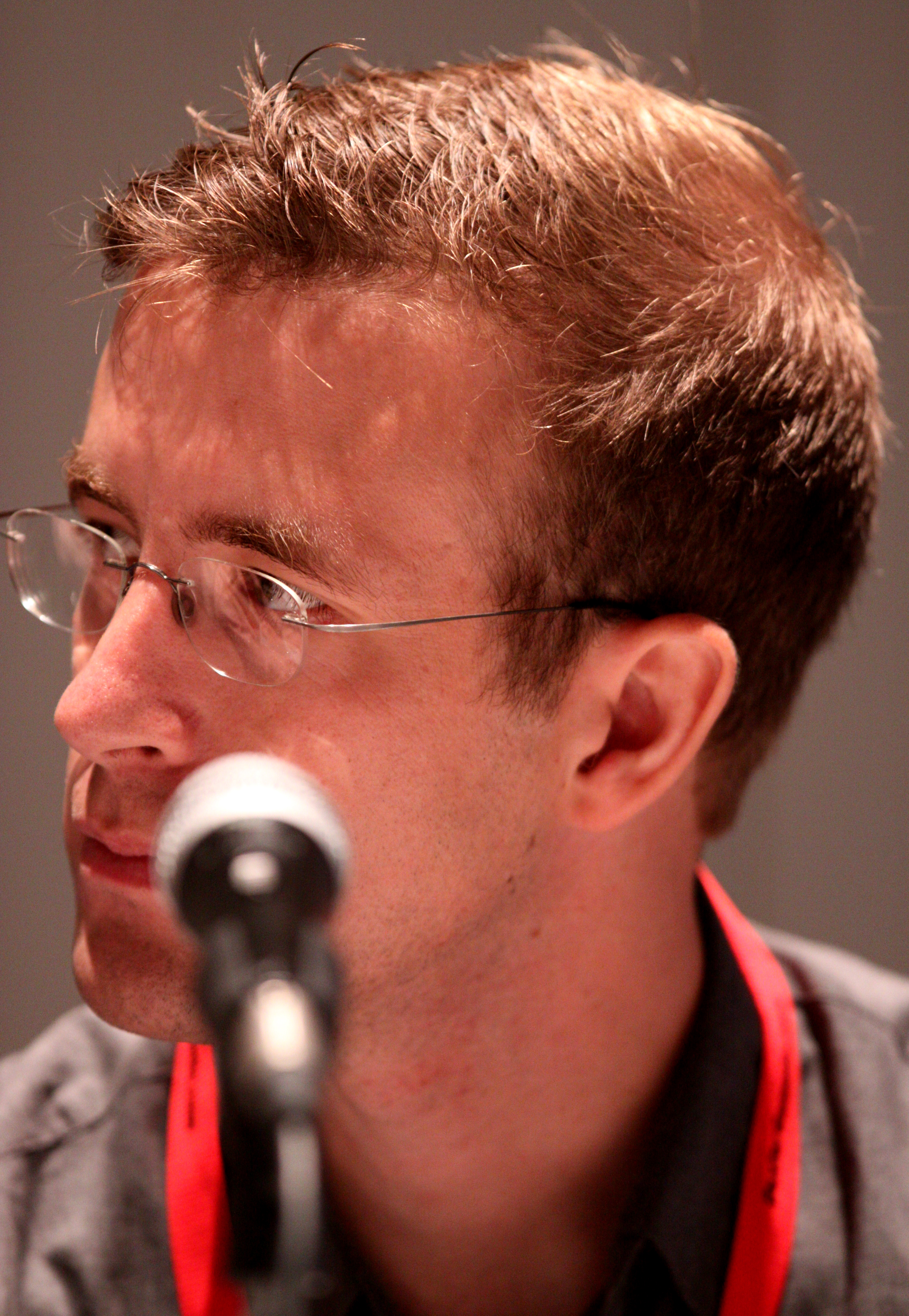
- Oberg at the 2010 San Diego Comic-Con
- Born: August 22, 1976 (age 50); Larchmont, New York, United States
- Occupation: Actor
- Years active: 2004–present

Matt Oberg (born August 22, 1976) is an American actor and comedian, known primarily for his roles in television series such as The Real O'Neals, Ugly Americans and Hart of Dixie, and for voicing Kite Man in Harley Quinn and Kite Man: Hell Yeah!. In 2015, he starred as Mitch Reed in The Comedians.

== Filmography ==
=== Film ===
Year	Title	Role	Notes
2010	A Little Help	Minister	
2011	They're Out of the Business	Wally	
2012	The Bourne Legacy	C-Team	
2013	Bert and Arnie's Guide to Friendship	Bert	
2015	Sisters	Rob	
2016	Brave New Jersey	Chardy Edwards	

=== Television ===
Year	Title	Role	Notes
2004	Chappelle's Show	Gay Butcher	Episode: "Season 2, Episode 11"
2007, 2013	30 Rock	Executive #2, Edward	2 episodes
2007	Starveillance	(voice)	Episode: "Pilot"
2009	Delocated	Network Executive	Episode: "Good Buds"
2010–12	Ugly Americans	Mark Lilly	31 episodes
2011	Onion SportsDome	Mark Shepard	10 episodes
2011	The Onion News Network	Tucker Hope	7 episodes
2013–15	Hart of Dixie	Scooter McGreevy	5 episodes
2014	Trophy Wife	DMV Clerk	Episode: "The Big 5-0"
2014	The Mindy Project	Zachary	2 episodes
2015	The Comedians	Mitch Reed	13 episodes
2016–17	The Real O'Neals	Clive Murray	Recurring role
2017	Powerless	Donovan Boucher	Episode: "Green Furious"
2017	Superstore	Confused Customer, Lawyer	3 episodes
2017–19	Veep	Buddy Calhoun	Recurring role
2017–18	Fresh Off the Boat	Matthew Chestnut	Recurring role
2018	Mom	Geoffrey	2 episodes
2019–present	Harley Quinn	Killer Croc, KGBeast, Bane Goon, Uncool Guard, Charles "Chuck" Brown / Kite-Man	Recurring roles
2023	American Auto	Gary	Episode: "Celebrity"
2024	Kite Man: Hell Yeah!	Charles "Chuck" Brown / Kite-Man	Main role
2024	Abbott Elementary	Miles Nathaniel	6 episodes
2025	Hacks	Brian Pile	6 episodes
2026	Elle	Principal Anderson	5 episodes

=== Video games ===
Year	Title	Role	Notes
2011	Ugly Americans: Apocalypsegeddon	Mark Lilly	
