= Harley Quinn (TV series) =

American adult animated dark comedy superhero television series

- Also known as: Harley Quinn & Poison Ivy (Note: Season 3, episode 1)
- Genre: Black comedy; Superhero
- Based on: Harley Quinn by: Paul Dini; Bruce Timm
- Developed by: Justin Halpern; Patrick Schumacker; Dean Lorey
- Voices of: Kaley Cuoco; Lake Bell; Alan Tudyk; Ron Funches; Tony Hale; Jason Alexander
- Music by: Jefferson Friedman
- Country of origin: United States
- Original language: English
- No. of seasons: 5
- No. of episodes: 57 (list of episodes)

Production
- Executive producers: Dean Lorey; Justin Halpern; Patrick Schumacker; Kaley Cuoco; Sam Register; Jessica Goldstein; Chrissy Pietrosh; Sarah Peters; Katie Rich
- Producers: Cecilia Aranovich Hamilton; Susan Ward; Sarah Nevada Smith
- Editors: James Atkinson; Annie De Brock; Craig Paulsen; Charles Breiner; Andy Young; Dave Courter; Thomas Latvys
- Running time: 23 minutes 44 minutes (special)
- Production companies: Yes, Norman Productions; Ehsugadee Productions; Delicious Non-Sequitur; Lorey Stories; DC Entertainment; DC Studios; Warner Bros. Animation

Original release
- Network: DC Universe
- Release: November 29, 2019 – June 26, 2020
- Network: HBO Max
- Release: July 28, 2022 – February 9, 2023
- Network: Max
- Release: July 27, 2023 – March 20, 2025

Related
- Kite Man: Hell Yeah!

Harley Quinn is an American adult animated superhero black comedy television series based on the DC Comics character of the same name created by Paul Dini and Bruce Timm. The series is written and executive-produced by Justin Halpern, Patrick Schumacker, and Dean Lorey, and follows the adventures of Harley Quinn and her partner Poison Ivy after leaving her boyfriend, the Joker. The series premiered on November 29, 2019.

The first and second seasons premiered on DC Universe, before moving to HBO Max for its third season and Max for its fourth. A standalone holiday-themed special episode premiered on February 9, 2023. In November 2023, the series was renewed for a fifth season, which premiered on January 16, 2025.

A spin-off series, Kite Man: Hell Yeah!, premiered in July 2024.

== Premise ==
The series follows the adventures of Harley Quinn and her journey of self-discovery after breaking up with the Joker upon realizing that he never loved her. Harley intends to make a name for herself in Gotham City's criminal underworld, starting with the formation of her own crew, which consists of her best friend Poison Ivy, Clayface, Doctor Psycho, King Shark, and Sy Borgman. During her attempts to prove herself as a competent villain, Harley faces her troubled past, gains self-confidence that helps her abolish the Joker's influence on her, and finds an autonomous identity.

In addition to the adventures of Harley's crew, the main storyline revolves around the relationship between Harley and Ivy. Having met in Arkham Asylum when Harley was Dr. Harleen Quinzel and Ivy's therapist, the two developed a strong friendship that gradually deepened over the course of the series. They eventually realize they have feelings for each other despite Ivy's initial insecurity and her engagement with Kite Man. After a series of misadventures, during which Harley proves her selfless love to Ivy and Kite Man breaks up with her in favor of Ivy's happiness, Harley and Ivy become a couple by the end of season two. Over later seasons, the pair experience what it is to be in a healthy romantic relationship with mutual support, honesty, and self-determination.

As the series progresses, more DC characters gain a bigger role in the story, primarily the members of the Bat Family and members of the Legion of Doom as Harley and Ivy figure out their respective goals regarding those affiliations. Harley realizes she wants to help people rather than hurting them while Ivy discovers the true potential of her superpowers and develops a social conscience.

Apart from Harley and Ivy, other members of Harley's crew begin to follow their own path; Clayface breaks out as an actor, King Shark becomes a father and the ruler of the Shark Kingdom, and Psycho starts his own self-help podcast. Most of the seasons also contain a standalone episode that does not feature Harley or Ivy but focuses on one of the supporting characters, such as Joker, Batman, or Bane.

== Cast and characters ==
=== Main ===
- Kaley Cuoco as Dr. Harleen Quinzel / Harley Quinn, Kylie Kryptonite, Harley Clone
- Lake Bell as Dr. Pamela Isley / Poison Ivy, Cheryl, Barbara Kean, Britney Bionic, Fans 1 & 2
- Alan Tudyk as the Joker, Clayface, Calendar Man, Doctor Trap, Condiment King, Firefly, Ocean Master, Kevin, Perry White
- Ron Funches as Prince Nanaue / King Shark
- Tony Hale as Doctor Psycho, Felix Faust

=== Supporting ===
- Charlie Adler as Nick Quinzel, Grandpa Quinzel
- James Adomian as Bane, Chaz, Ian, Ratcatcher, Clock King, Nelvin Eckles, Snowflame, Eclipso, Vincent Edge
- Jason Alexander as Sy Borgman
- Diedrich Bader as Bruce Wayne / Batman, Thomas Wayne, Gorilla Grodd, Steve, No Pinkie Pete
- Krizia Bajos as Bethany (seasons 3–4)
- Maria Bamford as Frankette
- Cherise Boothe as Selina Kyle / Catwoman (season 5)
- Kimberly Brooks as Shaun Shark
- Tisha Campbell as Tawny Young, Amanda Waller, Janice, M.O.N.I.C.A.
- James Corleto as Benicio
- Sammi Corona-Lampa as Sophia (seasons 2–4)
- Andy Daly as Harvey Dent / Two-Face, the President, Mister Miracle, Darryl Brown, Mr. Covington, High Owl
- Briana Cuoco as Barbara Gordon / Batgirl / Oracle
- Chris Diamantopoulos as Aquaman
- Paul W. Downs as The Jons
- Rachel Dratch as Nora Fries, Queen Hippolyta
- Aline Elasmar as Talia al Ghul, Livewire, Devora Macklewaithe
- Giancarlo Esposito as Lex Luthor (seasons 1–4)
- Susie Essman as Sharon Quinzel, Grandma Quinzel
- Stephen Fry as Brainiac
- Larissa Gallagher as Prawn, Amelie, Time Sphere
- Sean Giambrone as Joshua Cobblepot
- Harvey Guillén as Dick Grayson / Nightwing / Red X, Alvin
- James Gunn as himself
- Mary Holland as Jennifer, Tabitha
- Tom Hollander as Alfred Pennyworth / The Macaroni, Professor Pyg, Toyman
- Michael Ironside as Darkseid
- Wayne Knight as the Penguin
- Kerry Knuppe as Atlee / Terra
- Rahul Kohli as the Scarecrow
- Phil LaMarr as Jason Praxis, Black Manta, Lucius Fox, Brian, Samson, Shark God, Koko, Mr. Starr
- Sanaa Lathan as Selina Kyle / Catwoman (seasons 2–4)
- Ben Levin as Captain Cold
- Lilimar Hernandez as Sophia (season 5)
- Justina Machado as Bethany (season 2)
- Vanessa Marshall as Wonder Woman, Giganta, Joey Day
- Drew Massey as Jimmy Olsen
- Christopher Meloni as Commissioner James Gordon, Mr. Veronica Cale, Jeffrey the Parrot
- Alfred Molina as Mr. Freeze, Stew
- Natalie Morales as Lois Lane
- Matt Oberg as Kite Man, Killer Croc, KGBeast, Fred
- Vico Ortiz as Tefé Holland
- Edi Patterson as Veronica Cale
- Wendell Pierce as Lex Luthor (season 5)
- Scott Porter as The Flash (season 2)
- Jim Rash as the Riddler, Stan, Mr. Isley, Jor-El, Metallo, Tad, Luigi, Mayor of Gotham City, Imperceptible Man
- Sam Richardson as Alec Holland / Swamp Thing
- Zeno Robinson as The Flash (season 4)
- Will Sasso as Maxie Zeus
- Rory Scovel as Gus
- John Slattery as Dr. Jason Woodrue / Floronic Man
- J. B. Smoove as Frank the Plant
- Wanda Sykes as Queen of Fables
- Jeannie Tirado as Volcana
- Jacob Tremblay as Damian Wayne / Robin
- Aisha Tyler as Lena Luthor
- Gary Anthony Williams as the Shark Priest, Prince Shark, King Baby
- Casey Wilson as Betty
- James Wolk as Clark Kent / Superman

=== Guest voices ===
- Cathy Ang as Golden Glider
- Eric Bauza as Starro, Bouncing Boy
- Leila Birch as Enchantress (special)
- Quinta Brunson as Hawkgirl
- Lacey Chabert as Dr. Kara Zor-El / Supergirl
- Mary Deaton as Pippa Impersonator
- Carla Delaney as Goldilocks
- Keith Ferguson as Steppenwolf, Jonas
- Janeane Garofalo as Signora
- Brett Goldstein as himself
- Meryl Hathaway as Marcus
- Josh Helman as George Harkness / Captain Boomerang
- Jameela Jamil as Eris
- Tom Kenny as Clayface's Hand
- George Lopez as himself
- Zosia Mamet as Princess Ladyfingers / General Neytiri
- Howie Mandel as himself
- Brad Morris as Victor Zsasz
- Frankie Muniz as himself
- Suzy Nakamura as Realtor
- Griffin Newman as Jervis Tetch / the Mad Hatter
- Larry Owens as Music Meister
- Paula Pell as G.A.I.L.
- Rhea Perlman as Golda
- Jonah Platt as Clayface (singing voice)
- Katie Rich as Enchantress (season 5)
- Matt Ryan as John Constantine
- Amy Sedaris as Debbie Shirley
- John Stamos as Etrigan the Demon
- Jack Stanton as Young Bruce Wayne
- Nicole Sullivan as Mrs. Cobblepot, Benjamin
- Talia Tabin as Mrs. Calendar
- Jill Talley as Brainiac's Wife, Vril Dox II, Mrs. Starr
- Billy Bob Thornton as himself
- Gregg Turkington as Clegg
- Janet Varney as Mera
- Rain Valdez as Alysia Yeoh
- Kari Wahlgren as Plastique, Elizabeth II
- Jessica Walter as Granny Goodness, Wendy Brown
- Mark Whitten as Herman Cizko / The Cowled Critic
- Tyler James Williams as Hawkman

== Episodes ==
Season	Episodes	Originally released		
Season	Episodes	First released	Last released	Network
1	13	November 29, 2019	February 21, 2020	DC Universe
2	13	April 3, 2020	June 26, 2020	DC Universe
3	10	July 28, 2022	September 15, 2022	HBO Max
Special		February 9, 2023		HBO Max
4	10	July 27, 2023	September 14, 2023	Max
5	10	January 16, 2025	March 20, 2025	Max

== Production ==
=== Development ===
On November 20, 2017, it was announced that the then-unnamed DC Universe had ordered 26 episodes of Harley Quinn, a half-hour adult animated action-comedy series created and written by Justin Halpern, Patrick Schumacker and Dean Lorey. Executive producers were set to include Halpern, Schumacker, Lorey, and Sam Register with Jennifer Coyle serving as a producer. Production companies involved in the series were slated to consist of Ehsugadee Productions and Warner Bros. Animation. The first season consists of 13 episodes of the initial 26-episode order. Animation work is provided by NE4U, Digital eMation and Maven Image Platform in South Korea.

In June 2018, it was announced that the series would premiere in 2019. In October, it was further mapped as an October 2019 premiere. It was also reported that Kaley Cuoco would also serve as an executive producer for the series through her production company Yes, Norman Productions.

It was revealed that a second season was produced and consisted of another 13 episodes.

On September 18, 2020, three months after the second-season finale, it was announced that the series had been renewed for a third season, and would move to HBO Max. In February 2021, series creator Patrick Schumacker announced that they had begun recording season 3.

In June 2021, it was revealed that a planned oral sex scene between Catwoman and Batman in season 3 was cut by DC. It was replaced by a scene of Batman not being good at giving Catwoman a foot massage.

Schumacker stated the third season was more difficult to produce, but it will be much simpler not having to create two seasons back to back. Halpern has stated in an interview with Entertainment Weekly that season 3 will explore Harley's reaction to a half healthy relationship with Ivy as well as focusing more on Ivy's backstory as the previous two seasons were mainly focused on Harley. Schumacker said that new writers from the LGBTQ+ community have been hired because of the direction of season 2 and that it is a priority to diversify the staff for season 3. Schumacker also revealed that Dean Lorey would no longer be available to return as showrunner for season 3 and would be replaced by new co-showrunners Chrissy Pietrosh and Jessica Goldstein alongside him and Justin Halpern. Composer Jefferson Friedman revealed there would be a musical episode coming, and also stated that he wanted to refresh the music to give identity for each character. During an interview with Deadline Hollywood, Schumacker stated that his desire was to open season 3 on "an actual Zoom, where the GCPD is just being berated by the city of Gotham for their ineptitude". In February 2021, series creator Patrick Schumacker announced that they had begun recording season 3.

At DC FanDome 2021, Harley, King Shark, and Kite Man previewed some animatic footage from the third season, and announced it would be coming to HBO Max "sometime in 2022".

A comic prequel to season 3 was first released on August 3, 2021, under the title Harley Quinn: The Animated Series – The Eat. Bang! Kill. Tour by Tee Franklin (author), Max Sarin (cover art, penciller, inker), and Marissa Louise (colorist), in which Harley takes Ivy on a honeymoon where they face friends they've betrayed, their own feelings about how season 2 ended, and a few villains and heroes along the way. Commissioner Gordon tries to catch them repeatedly, causing Batman and Batgirl to worry about his sanity.

On August 9, 2022, it was announced that a fourth season is in development. On August 31, 2022, HBO Max renewed the series for a fourth season with Sarah Peters promoted to executive producer and showrunner, since Halpern and Schumacker will be busy with Kite Man: Hell Yeah!. On October 7, 2022, it was reported that the series is getting a holiday special called "Harley Quinn: A Very Problematic Valentine's Day Special" which was released in February 2023. On November 16, 2023, Max renewed the series for a fifth season, for which, Lorey became showrunner again.

People conducted an interview, on March 11, 2025, discussing what a hypothetical season 6 could be like. Executive producer Dean Lorey told Collider on March 22, 2025 that he hoped that they "stop one season before the wheels fall off," adding that they "have a pretty wonderful idea for what Season 6 would be if we get so lucky" and that they are "excited to continue." He also said that they have "every intention of doing more" and are doing "a lot of work figuring out what that will be." Previously, Lorey said that a sixth season would be "something very different...and...unexpected" and said that they "certainly plan to have more seasons."

=== Casting ===
Alongside the series order announcement, it was reported that the producers of the series were expected to approach Margot Robbie, who portrays the character in the DC Extended Universe (DCEU), to reprise the role; but this was false. In an interview after the season 1 release, Halpern went on record saying Robbie was kept in the loop, but she was never interested in playing the role since she was filming and producing Birds of Prey at the time. Other characters expected to be featured in the series included Joker, Poison Ivy, Sy Borgman, Doctor Psycho, Malice Vundabar, King Shark, and Clayface.

On October 3, 2018, it was announced that Cuoco would voice Harley Quinn and Lake Bell would voice Poison Ivy. Additional voice actors in the series include Alan Tudyk as Joker and Clayface, Ron Funches as King Shark, J. B. Smoove as Frank the Plant, Jason Alexander as Sy Borgman, Wanda Sykes as the Queen of Fables, Giancarlo Esposito as Lex Luthor, Natalie Morales as Lois Lane, Jim Rash as Riddler, Diedrich Bader reprising his role from Batman: The Brave and the Bold as Batman himself, Tony Hale as Dr. Psycho and Christopher Meloni as James Gordon. Shortly after, Rahul Kohli revealed he would voice Scarecrow in the series. In June 2019, Sanaa Lathan was revealed to be voicing Catwoman, who was depicted as African-American. On July 24, 2019, Vanessa Marshall revealed to be reprising Wonder Woman from Justice League: Crisis on Two Earths and Justice League: The Flashpoint Paradox. While on the following day, TV Guide revealed that veteran voice actor Charlie Adler has been confirmed to serve as the series' additional voice director with Schumacker and Lorey serving as the voice directors. In February 2020, Alfred Molina was announced to be voicing Mr. Freeze. In April 2020, Schumacker confirmed that Michael Ironside would be reprising his role as Darkseid from both the DC Animated Universe and the Lego DC Super-Villains video game.

In June 2021, Sam Richardson was announced as having joined the cast as Swamp Thing. In March 2022, filmmaker–later co-chairman and co-CEO of DC Studios, James Gunn announced he will voice himself in the show's third season; the showrunners contacted him on Twitter about making an appearance, knowing he was a fan of the show. Gunn recorded his lines remotely, as he was directing his DCEU series Peacemaker in Vancouver, Canada, while season 3 was being developed. That same month, Harvey Guillén was cast to play Nightwing.

In December 2024, Stephen Fry was revealed to be voicing Brainiac along with Aisha Tyler as Lena Luthor.

=== Music ===
Jefferson Friedman composed the music for the series. WaterTower Music released the soundtrack album for season 1 on August 21, 2020. The season 2 album was released on the same day.

=== LGBTQ representation ===
In the DC Universe, Harley Quinn (Dr. Harleen Quinzel) and Poison Ivy (Dr. Pamela Isley) started as friends. In the comics, Harley and Ivy would refer to each other as "Peanut" and "Pam-A-Lamb". The writers took notice giving them moments of birthday kisses and taking showers together making their friendship more intimate. Harley Quinn's and Poison Ivy's relationship took a turn in Gotham City Sirens when Harley whispers into Ivy's ear that the reason she "saves her" from the Joker is due to her romantic feelings for her, although the scene ends with Harley going back to Joker. It was not until the 2013 Amanda Connor and Jimmy Palmiotti's Harley Quinn comic series where they are shown in a romantic coupling instead of friendship. Harley refers to Ivy as her "hot girlfriend" and the two are in an open relationship where they can pursue other partners while remaining dedicated to each other. Outside the main universe, Harley and Ivy even got married in Injustice 2.

In the May 15, 2020, episode "There's No Place to Go But Down" Harley Quinn saved her partner-in-crime, Poison Ivy; both kissed each other after they escaped from prison. One critic who reviewed the episode stated that Harley and Ivy's romance was a "slow burn", adding that this love affair could turn into a "more realistic exploration of how it feels to fall in love with a friend or to have an awkward hookup with a workmate". Another reviewer, Sophie Perry, writing for a lesbian lifestyle magazine, Curve, noted how queerbaiting has long endured in LGBTQ+ representation, noting how She-Ra and Harley Quinn both had same-sex kisses, happening within stories which could have turned out to be "typical queerbaiting" but did not.

In the Valentine's Day special, Clayface, a member of Harley's villain crew, asks himself how he identifies his sexuality and says that he's fluid. This was after he attempted to go on a date with a man named Jimmy, and fits with his tendency to morph into people of all genders with equal enthusiasm. In season 2, he shifted into a woman named Stephanie and dated a college student named Chad.

The third episode of Season 3 brings another queer couple, introducing Clock King as The Riddler's boyfriend. Their relationship continues through the series, later getting engaged and then married.

In 2021, the series was nominated for a GLAAD Media Award for Outstanding Comedy Series. The series was also nominated for several awards at Autostraddle's 4th Annual Gay Emmys, in the categories of "Best Episode with LGBTQ+ Themes" for the episode "Something Borrowed," and "Outstanding Animated Series". The trailer for the show's third season, which came out in October 2021, was described as showing that the series is "for the gays".

== Release ==
Harley Quinn premiered on DC Universe on November 29, 2019. On October 3, 2018, ahead of the annual New York Comic Con, a teaser trailer featuring Harley Quinn, Poison Ivy and Batman in Arkham was released. A full, uncensored trailer set to Joan Jett's cover of the theme song from The Mary Tyler Moore Show was released on July 20, 2019, to coincide with the panel at San Diego Comic-Con.

On December 8, 2019, the first episode was shown as a special presentation on TBS. Season 1 started airing on Syfy on May 3, 2020. The series has aired on Adult Swim in Canada, with new episodes airing a week after their American premiere. The series started airing on E4 in the United Kingdom and Ireland on May 7, 2020. The series debuted on HBO Max on August 1, 2020. In the United States, Adult Swim's Toonami programming block aired a marathon of the first season on the night of August 7–8, 2021. On June 23, 2022, the series began airing on TNT. In Eastern Europe, the series became available on March 8, 2022, via HBO Max. The second season was available to stream on April 3, 2020, on DC Universe. An original short featuring Harley answering questions from fans was released online during DC FanDome in 2020. The first three episodes of season 3 were released on July 28, 2022, on HBO Max, with the remaining seven episodes released weekly until September 15, 2022. The fourth season premiered on July 27, 2023. The fifth season premiered on January 16, 2025.

=== Home media ===
The first season was released on DVD on June 2, 2020, and the second season was released on February 16, 2021, by Warner Bros. Home Entertainment. The first two seasons were also released on Blu-ray by Warner Bros. Home Entertainment under the Warner Archive Collection on February 16, 2021. The third season was released on Blu-ray on September 5, 2023.

Digitally, the first two seasons are also available for digital purchase on Amazon Prime Video and iTunes.

== Reception ==
=== Audience viewership ===
According to Reelgood, Harley Quinn has ranked among the top 30 comic book TV shows across all streaming services. According to Parrot Analytics, since the pandemic began, the series has ranked among the top 10 most in-demand digital series in five months and ranked as HBO Max's 8th most in-demand series overall domestically.

=== Critical response ===
Critical response of Harley Quinn
Season	Rotten Tomatoes	Metacritic
1	89% (37 reviews)	82 (7 reviews)
2	100% (25 reviews)	—N/a
3	100% (26 reviews)	94 (7 reviews)
4	96% (23 reviews)	81 (5 reviews)
5	94% (16 reviews)	—N/a

Harley Quinn has received critical acclaim since its release. On Rotten Tomatoes, the first season has an approval rating of 89% based on 37 reviews, with an average rating of 8/10. The website's critical consensus reads, "A strong voice cast and an even stronger grasp of what makes its titular antiheroine so beloved make Harley Quinn a violently delightful—and surprisingly insightful—addition to the DC animated universe." On Metacritic, the season has a weighted average score of 82 out of 100, based on reviews from 7 critics, indicating "universal acclaim".

The second season has an approval rating of 100% based on 25 reviews, with an average rating of 8.6/10. The website's critics consensus states, "Harley Quinn maintains its frenetic energy and humor while doubling down on the shenanigans and giving its titular anti-heroine even more room to play."

The third season has an approval rating of 100% based on 25 reviews, with an average rating of 8.8/10. The website's critics consensus reads, "Who woulda thought? — Harley Quinn graduates from a ribald spoof into one of the most heartening additions to the DC canon in a diabolically clever and emotionally textured third season." On Metacritic, the season has a weighted average score of 94 out of 100, based on reviews from 7 critics, indicating "universal acclaim".

The fourth season has an approval rating of 96% based on 23 reviews, with an average rating of 8.1/10. The website's critics consensus states, "Having settled into one of DC's most dependably entertaining series, Harley Quinn continues to be funny, quirky, and romantic." On Metacritic, the season has a weighted average score of 81 out of 100, based on reviews from 5 critics, indicating "universal acclaim".

The fifth season holds an approval rating of 94% based on 16 reviews, with an average rating of 7.9/10. The website's critics consensus reads, "Harley Quinn continues to grow, love and kill its way to the audiences' heart, proving it can't go wrong with a formula this good."

Caroline Framke of Variety wrote: "The animation feels like that of a typical Saturday morning cartoon, but its acidic scripts and shocking bursts of gore reminds you that Harley Quinn is taking full advantage of airing on a streaming service without censors. ... Sharp voice performances across the board from actors clearly relishing the chance to play in this world also prove too fun to resist. ... Most importantly, Harley gets to be an entire person all her own, as heartbreakingly naive as she is wickedly strange and funny." Robyn Bahr of The Hollywood Reporter wrote: "It's one of the best surprises of the year. ... 13 zippy, violent and irreverent half-hour episodes. ... The writing is frequently uproarious, chock full of Millennial nostalgia and cerebral gallows humor (the former may be low-hanging, rapidly-perishable fruit, but at least the show knows how to embrace its audience)."

=== Accolades ===
Award	Year	Category	Recipient(s)	Result	Ref.
Annie Awards	2020	Best TV/Media — General Audience	"So You Need a Crew?"	Nominated	
Annie Awards	2021	Best TV/Media – General Audience	"Something Borrowed, Something Green"	Nominated	
Annie Awards	2021	Best Writing – TV/Media	Sarah Peters for "Something Borrowed, Something Green"	Nominated	
Annie Awards	2023	Best TV/Media – Mature	"Batman Begins Forever"	Nominated	
Artios Awards	2021	Television Animation	Robert McGee and Ruth Lambert	Nominated	
Astra Creative Arts TV Awards	2024	Best Streaming Animated Series or TV Movie	Harley Quinn	Nominated	
Critics' Choice Super Awards	2021	Best Animated Series	Harley Quinn	Nominated	
Critics' Choice Super Awards	2021	Best Voice Actress in an Animated Series	Kaley Cuoco	Won	
Critics' Choice Super Awards	2021	Best Voice Actor in an Animated Series	J. B. Smoove	Nominated	
Critics' Choice Television Awards	2023	Best Animated Series	Harley Quinn	Won	
Critics' Choice Television Awards	2024	Best Animated Series	Harley Quinn	Nominated	
Dorian TV Awards	2021	Best Animated Show	Harley Quinn	Nominated	
Dorian TV Awards	2023	Best Animated Show	Harley Quinn	Won	
GLAAD Media Award	2021	Outstanding Comedy Series	Harley Quinn	Nominated	
GLAAD Media Award	2023	Outstanding Comedy Series	Harley Quinn	Nominated	
GLAAD Media Award	2024	Outstanding Comedy Series	Harley Quinn	Nominated	
Hollywood Critics Association TV Awards	2021	Best Animated Series or Animated Television Movie	Harley Quinn	Won	
Saturn Awards	2024	Best Animated Television Series or Special	Harley Quinn	Nominated	

== Comics ==
- Harley Quinn: The Animated Series: The Eat. Bang! Kill Tour: A 6-part series set between seasons 2 and 3 of the television series.
- Harley Quinn: The Animated Series: The Real Sidekicks of New Gotham Special: A 6 stories one-shot special set after season 3 of the television series.
- Harley Quinn: The Animated Series: Legion of Bats!: A series set after season 3 of the television series, where Harley Quinn joins the Bat-Family, while Poison Ivy becomes Legion of Doom's leader.

=== Publications ===
- Harley Quinn: The Animated Series Vol. 1: The Eat. Bang! Kill Tour (ISBN 978-1-77951-664-0/EAN-5 52499, 2022-08-30): Includes Harley Quinn: The Animated Series: The Eat. Bang! Kill Tour #1–6.
- Harley Quinn: The Animated Series: The Real Sidekicks of New Gotham Special (2022-08-30): Includes Tawny Tawks, Double Date, Identity Crisis, Showtime!, Wild Rlde, Two Jokers.

== Spin-off ==
Following the season 4 finale of Harley Quinn on September 14, 2023, it was announced that a spin-off series following the adventures of Kite Man and his girlfriend Golden Glider, titled Kite Man: Hell Yeah! (originally known as Noonan's), would officially premiere on July 18, 2024. The first season of Kite Man: Hell Yeah! consists of ten episodes, with Oberg returning to voice Kite-Man.
