= The Comedians (2015 TV series) =

American comedy television series

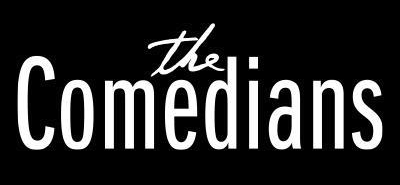
- Genre: Comedy; Mockumentary
- Based on: Ulveson och Herngren by Felix Herngren & John Nordling
- Developed by: Larry Charles; Billy Crystal; Matt Nix; Ben Wexler
- Starring: Billy Crystal; Josh Gad; Stephnie Weir; Matt Oberg; Dana Delany; Megan Ferguson
- Country of origin: United States
- Original language: English
- No. of seasons: 1
- No. of episodes: 13

Production
- Executive producers: Larry Charles; Jennifer Corey; Billy Crystal; Matt Nix; Ben Wexler; Henrik Bastin; Mikkel Bondesen; Carl Molinder; John Nordling
- Producers: Samantha Sprecher; Victor Hsu
- Camera setup: Single-camera
- Running time: 20-23 minutes
- Production companies: Jennilind Productions; Larry Charles Projects; Tamaroa Productions; Flying Glass of Milk Productions; Fabrik Entertainment; FX Productions; Fox 21 Television Studios

Original release
- Network: FX
- Release: April 9 – June 25, 2015

Related
- Ulveson och Herngren (2004)

The Comedians is an American comedy television series starring Billy Crystal and Josh Gad as fictional versions of themselves. A 13-episode first season was ordered by FX, and premiered on April 9, 2015. The series was developed by Larry Charles, Billy Crystal, Matt Nix, and Ben Wexler. On July 23, 2015, the series was cancelled after one season.

Because of the merge between Fox Television Studios and Fox 21, The Comedians was the first production by Fox 21 Television Studios.

It is an adaptation of the Swedish SVT series Ulveson och Herngren.

== Cast ==
- Billy Crystal as Billy, a superstar veteran comedian
- Josh Gad as Josh, a younger, edgier comic
- Matt Oberg as Mitch, the head writer of Billy and Josh's sketch show
- Stephnie Weir as Kristen, an anxiety-ridden producer
- Megan Ferguson as Esme, a PA on the show
- Dana Delany as Julie, Billy's wife

=== Guest Stars ===
- Mel Brooks as himself
- Rob Reiner as himself
- Jimmy Kimmel as himself
- Sugar Ray Leonard as himself
- Larry Charles as himself
- Robert Lopez as himself
- Kristen Anderson-Lopez as herself
- Steven Weber as Jamie Dobbs
- Rick Glassman as Clifford

== Episodes ==
No.	Title	Directed by	Written by	Original release date	Prod. code	US viewers (millions)
1	"Pilot"	Larry Charles	Ben Wexler & Matt Nix & Larry Charles & Billy Crystal	April 9, 2015	179	0.878
Billy Crystal unsuccessfully pitches a show that completely focuses on himself, entitled The Billy and Billy Show, to FX. Network executives agree to pick up the show under the condition that Josh Gad co-stars with Crystal, and it is re-branded as The Billy and Josh Show. Both Crystal and Gad hesitantly agree to work together on the show, but struggle to relate to each other and find common ground.
2	"Come to the House"	Larry Charles	Ben Wexler	April 16, 2015	101	0.534
In an attempt to bond outside of work, Billy invites Josh over to watch a Los Angeles Clippers basketball game at his house.
3	"The Red Carpet"	Larry Charles	Andrew Secunda	April 23, 2015	102	0.439
When Billy and Josh are both nominated for the same award, they decide to walk the red carpet together.
4	"Celebrity Guest"	David Mandel	Ben Wexler & Matt Nix	April 30, 2015	106	0.680
When FX pushes the premiere date of The Billy & Josh Show, the guys try to fix the show by pulling in opposite directions. Billy attempts to get Mel Brooks to make a guest appearance, while Josh asks Kristen and Robert Lopez to write an original song for the show. Mel Brooks was nominated for the Primetime Emmy Award for Outstanding Guest Actor in a Comedy Series for his performance in this episode.
5	"Go for Gad"	Larry Charles	Laura Krafft	May 7, 2015	103	0.474
When Josh is up for a role in a new Martin Scorsese film, he lets his ego get the best of him.
6	"Orange You the New Black Guy"	Larry Charles	Andrew Secunda	May 14, 2015	104	0.381
Billy and Josh insist on hiring a black writer when they become worried that there is a lack of diversity on the show's crew.
7	"Billy's Birthday"	Larry Charles	Eric Ledgin	May 21, 2015	107	0.387
When Billy is upset about turning 67, Josh takes him out for his birthday.
8	"Charity"	Richie Keen	Ben Wexler	May 28, 2015	109	0.624
Billy has an awkward interaction with a homeless man; Josh goes to his crush's charity event.
9	"Damage Control"	David Mandel	Laura Kittrel	June 4, 2015	105	0.302
An embarrassing viral video of Billy and Josh leaks on the Internet and the guys deal with the fallout.
10	"Misdirection"	Larry Charles	Eric Ledgin	June 11, 2015	111	0.390
After failing to get Rob Reiner to direct the show, Billy and Josh turn to an indie horror filmmaker, who suggests they do a location shoot in the woods at night.
11	"Red, White & Working Blue"	Richie Keen	Ben Wexler	June 18, 2015	110	0.532
After Billy axes a sketch that Josh writes, the crew must film a new one on the 4th of July.
12	"Overhear"	Larry Charles	Dan Gregor & Doug Mand	June 25, 2015	108	0.509
After Billy overhears Josh and his friend making fun of him, things get tense on set.
13	"Partners"	Larry Charles	Ben Wexler	June 25, 2015	112	0.306
Billy and Josh start to worry about the future as filming of the show's first season wraps up.

== Reception ==
The Comedians received mixed reviews from critics. On Rotten Tomatoes, the series has a rating of 58%, based on 38 reviews, with an average rating of 7.1/10. The site's critical consensus reads, "Though The Comedians' material doesn't break any TV molds, the stars' comic abilities push the show over the median with well-earned laughs." On Metacritic, the series has a score of 57 out of 100, based on 30 critics, indicating "mixed or average reviews".
