= Queen of Fables =

- The Queen of Fables as depicted in Wonder Woman (vol. 3) #24 (November 2008). Art by Bernard Chang.

Publication information
- Publisher: DC Comics
- First appearance: JLA #47 (November 2000)
- Created by: Bryan Hitch (artist); Mark Waid (writer)

In-story information
- Alter ego: Tsaritsa
- Species: Homo magi
- Abilities: Magic; Immortality; Commands an army of supernatural creatures; Reanimation; Reality alteration; Fairytale embodiment; Fictional-character summoning; Disintegration; Petrification; Conjuration; Omniscience; Matter manipulation; Metamorphosis; Size alteration; Spell casting; Eldritch blasts; Telekinesis; Teleportation; Telepathy; Empathy

Queen of Fables is a supervillain appearing in media published by DC Comics. Based on the character of the Evil Queen from "Snow White", the Queen of Fables is the living embodiment of all evil in folklore. She first appeared in JLA #47 (November 2000), and was created by Mark Waid, and Bryan Hitch.

Wanda Sykes voices the Queen of Fables in HBO's Harley Quinn, with Janelle James replacing Sykes for the spin-off series Kite Man: Hell Yeah!.

== Fictional character biography ==
The Queen of Fables was originally an evil sorceress from another dimension who was exiled to Earth and used her magic to oppress humanity. She reigned until princess Snow White defied her and she was trapped in the Book of Fables. Snow White used the book to turn fact into fiction and undo the Queen's acts.

Countless generations later, the Queen is unwittingly released from her prison. She transforms Manhattan into an enchanted forest full of creatures extracted from folk tales, having become obsessed with them. After being released, she attempts to locate Snow White, mistaking a television for a magic mirror, and orders it to show her "the fairest in the land". The Queen is shown a news report of the Justice League's latest battle and introduced to Wonder Woman, who she believes to be her daughter. The Queen exacts "revenge" by placing Wonder Woman in an enchanted sleep until she is awoken by Aquaman. Eventually, the Justice League manages to stop the Queen by making her realize that she was no longer immortal and eternally beautiful in the real world, and imprisons her in a tax book.

The Queen of Fables manages to free herself from the book and sets her sights on Superman. After transporting Superman to a glass forest, he is able to win his freedom and defeat the Queen (although the effort leaves him weak).

The Queen returns again after assuming the identity of Laney Kirswel, the film executive in charge of an unauthorized Wonder Woman biography, made mostly of unapproved and slandering materials. She deliberately puts Wonder Woman through hellish scenarios taken from the film, meant to represent distorted happenings in her life. Diana realizes the truth and coaxes the Queen into taking the form of a dragon, then blinds her with two axes, forcing her to flee.

== Powers and abilities ==
As a sorceress, the Queen of Fables has the power to alter the fabric of reality. She can conjure fictional beings and elements into real life, such as when she transformed Manhattan into an enchanted forest.

Styling herself as a fantasy queen, she prefers to summon creatures such as dragons, trolls, fairies, witches, ogres and goblins to serve her. Because her power is drawn from human imagination and fear, it is virtually limitless and gives the Queen the power to easily overcome even opponents as powerful as the Justice League. She also possesses immortality and eternal youth through her magic storybook, within which she cannot be harmed.

The Queen's only weakness is that she must have something creative to draw upon to maintain her power, usually a story. Without such creativity, she is powerless.

== In other media ==
=== Television ===
- The Queen of Fables appears in Harley Quinn, voiced by Wanda Sykes. This version's powers are derived from a magical storybook, the Book of Fables. In the 1980s, she attempted to transform Gotham City into an enchanted forest kingdom before being defeated by the Justice League and imprisoned in a tax book by Zatanna. In the present, the Queen is freed by a court order and sentenced to serve the rest of her term at Arkham Asylum. After Harley Quinn breaks her out in transit, the Queen temporarily joins her crew before her extreme and violent methods lead to her being ousted and vowing revenge. The Queen attempts to kill Harley and her crew, but is decapitated and reduced to a disembodied head.
  - The Queen of Fables appears in Kite Man: Hell Yeah!, voiced by Janelle James.

=== Video games ===
The Queen of Fables appears as a character summon in Scribblenauts Unmasked: A DC Comics Adventure.

=== Miscellaneous ===
- The Queen of Fables appears in Batman: The Brave and the Bold #5.
- The Queen of Fables appears in DC Super Friends #21.
