= Jefferson Friedman =

American composer (born 1974)

- Born: Swampscott, Massachusetts
- Education: Columbia University

Jefferson Friedman (born 1974) is an American composer. He has composed several orchestral pieces and television scores including Harley Quinn.

Friedman was born in Swampscott, Massachusetts. He received an M.M. degree in music composition from The Juilliard School, where he studied with John Corigliano, and a B.A. from Columbia University, where he studied with David Rakowski and Jonathan Kramer. Friedman also studied with George Tsontakis and Christopher Rouse. He lives in Los Angeles.

== Career ==
Friedman's work has received positive reviews. His pieces have been performed throughout the United States and abroad, including at the Kennedy Center for the Performing Arts, Lincoln Center's Alice Tully Hall and Avery Fisher Hall, the Brooklyn Academy of Music, Carnegie Hall's Weill Recital Hall, the Hollywood Bowl, and the American Academy in Rome.

Friedman was commissioned by Leonard Slatkin to write three pieces for the National Symphony Orchestra: "March", "The Throne of the Third Heaven of the Nations Millennium General Assembly", and "Sacred Heart: Explosion"

"March" is a brief closing piece, commissioned by the orchestra as part of the Hechinger Encores series. "The Throne" and "Sacred Heart" are the second and third sections of a planned orchestral trilogy entitled In the Realms of the Unreal, each movement of which is based on the life and work of a different American outsider or visionary artist.

"The Throne" is a musical depiction of Washington outsider artist James Hampton's (1909–1964) sculptural work of the same name. After its premiere, The Washington Post described the piece as having "ambitious scale and complexity" The piece has subsequently been performed by the New York Philharmonic at Lincoln Center's Avery Fischer Hall, and by the Los Angeles Philharmonic at the Hollywood Bowl.

"Sacred Heart: Explosion" was commissioned in October 2007, as a revised version of something Friedman wrote while a student at Juilliard. This is based on the work of visionary artist Henry Darger, of Chicago (1892–1972). After the premiere, The Washington Times reported that it was "thoroughly modern, highly intelligent music." It was performed by the Chicago Symphony Orchestra in June 2008, and included in the 2008 exhibit "Dargerism: Contemporary Artists and Henry Darger" at the American Folk Art Museum in New York

Other works include two string quartets, No. 2 and No. 3, written for the Chiara String Quartet. (Note: Sequenza 21 reported about quartet No. 3, " about two-thirds of the way through, something special happens... one realizes one has just heard something a little amazing.") String Quartet No. 2 was published by G. Schirmer, Inc. as part of the New American Voices series, and recorded by The Corigliano Quartet for their Naxos debut CD. (Note: No. 2 was performed with choreography by Brian Reeder at Columbia University's Miller Theatre. Selections from both quartets were performed at the Brooklyn Academy of Music, in a festival honoring John Corigliano's 70th birthday.)

Friedman also composed two pieces for a concert at the Miller Theater in February 2009: a solo piano piece written for Simone Dinnerstein, and a set of songs for rock singer and chamber ensemble, performed by Craig Wedren.

With the exception of String Quartet No. 2, his catalog is self-published by Montana 59 Music.

=== Recognition and other work ===
Friedman received awards for his work at Juilliard, and later received the 2004 Rome Prize Fellowship in Musical Composition, and the Leo Kaplan Award and Morton Gould Award from the ASCAP.

In addition to his composition, Mr. Friedman has performed with a number of rock bands, including Shudder To Think, and the electronic music duo Matmos, contributing string arrangements for their album The Rose Has Teeth in the Mouth of a Beast.

Friedman is the composer of the score for the adult animated sitcom Harley Quinn, as well as the score for the web series Helluva Boss.

In 2012 his String Quartet No. 3 was nominated for the Grammy Award for Best Classical Contemporary Composition.

== Discography ==
- Quartets (New Amsterdam Records, 2011)
- On In Love (New Amsterdam Records, 2014)
- Harley Quinn: Season 1 (WaterTower Music, 2020)
- Harley Quinn: Season 2 (WaterTower Music, 2020)
