= Kite Man =

- Kite Man as seen in the interior artwork from Batman #27 (September 2017). Art by Clay Mann and Danny Miki.

Publication information
- Publisher: DC Comics
- First appearance: Batman #133 (August 1960)
- Created by: Bill Finger; Dick Sprang

In-story information
- Alter ego: Charles "Chuck" Brown Ruadhàn Marrinan
- Species: Human
- Abilities: Excellent hang-glider pilot Uses a variety of gimmicked kites

Kite Man (Charles "Chuck" Brown) is a supervillain appearing in American comic books published by DC Comics who uses kite-based weapons to commit crimes. He is commonly depicted as an adversary of Batman. His name is an homage to Peanuts protagonist Charlie Brown, due to the latter character commonly being shown flying kites into trees. The character has been generally regarded as a joke in comparison with other supervillains due to his dimwitted personality and laughable gimmick. However, with his appearance in the DC Rebirth arc "The War of Jokes and Riddles", Kite Man gained a reputation as a cult favorite character among fans, due to his tragic backstory, persistence and motivation to become a better villain, and his catchphrase "Kite Man, hell yeah!".

In recent years, Kite Man has been adapted into several forms of media outside of comics, such as the adult animated series Harley Quinn, in which he is voiced by Matt Oberg. Oberg reprises his role in the spin-off series Kite Man: Hell Yeah!.

== Publication history ==
Kite Man first appeared in Batman #133 (August 1960), and was created by writer Bill Finger and artist Dick Sprang. He subsequently appeared in Batman #315 (September 1979) by Len Wein.

Tony Isabella would use the character in Hawkman #4 (November 1986), giving him the name Chuck and the catchphrase "Rats!" after Charlie Brown. Following this, he was primarily used as a minor character before being featured in Tom King's DC Rebirth Batman series.

== Fictional character biography ==
Charles "Chuck" Brown is a man who armed himself with kite weapons to be used to commit acts of evil. He flies with a big kite strapped to himself or in a kite plane. He also uses an array of specialty kites to overwhelm his enemies and commit crimes.

In his first appearance (which he announces), in Batman #133, he first drops tear gas from his kite to steal a precious ruby then frees mobster Big Bill Collins, nearly killing Robin along the way and capturing Batman. Leaving mobsters to guard Batman's room, on his return Kite Man is defeated when Robin returns, frees Batman and they use his own amazing Kite weapons against him, leaving a Kite Plane trophy on the Batcave wall.

Writer Len Wein brought him back in a story about payroll heists.

Hawkman, Hawkgirl, and Zatanna confront him again, in Hawkman's title. His real name is revealed. Zatanna defeats him in midair, and he falls into a tree and exclaims "Rats!"

Kite Man is one of many criminals to take advantage of the supervillain-friendly atmosphere of the country Zandia. He ends up joining its sports team and later becomes involved in a fight against an invading troop of superheroes.

In Infinite Crisis, Joker reports that Brown was thrown off Wayne Tower without his kite by Deathstroke after refusing to join the Secret Society of Super Villains. In 52, Kite Man is revealed to have survived, but is killed by Bruno Mannheim.

=== DC Rebirth ===
Kite Man appears in the DC Rebirth universe. This version is referred to as Charles, Chuck, and Charlie Brown. He seems to be happier, constantly chanting the catch-phrase "Kite Man, hell yeah!", a reference to his son, Charles Brown Jr.'s reaction to the first time he tried flying a kite. He first appears robbing a luxurious party before being foiled by Gotham Girl. He is then seen in a prison cell in Arkham Asylum as Batman walks down the aisles looking for criminals.

At some point, he escapes, as he is later one of the many villains taken down by Batman and Catwoman after he takes her along with him on an average night of his job in Gotham City. Kite Man later sold a kite to a pawn shop, where Headhunter purchased it to use to kill Swamp Thing's father. Batman and Swamp Thing interrogated Kite Man later.

In a story set during the early years of Batman's career, it is revealed that he studied wind in school. He was a divorced father, became an alcoholic and began a life of criminal activities, eventually being recruited by the Joker to design the Jokermobile. During "The War of Jokes and Riddles", he becomes encircled by Batman, who commands him to get the Joker's phone number and, later, to meet him. Shortly after, the Riddler kidnaps Charles, wanting to know about his future meeting with the Joker. After being freed, he is kidnapped again, this time by the Joker, who tells him about his encounters with Batman and the Riddler. He is then forced to serve as a suicide bomber by the Joker to kill Batman, but realizes that the bomb is fake. Charles Brown Jr., his son, is poisoned by the Riddler and subsequently dies. Wanting to get revenge on the Riddler, Charles Brown creates the persona of Kite Man to join the Joker's side.

After Batman joins the Riddler's side on the war he starts to defeat every villain on Joker's side, leaving Kite Man for last. When Kite Man is captured he tells Batman and the Riddler about Joker's last secret hideout on a building and provides them and all the villains on Riddler's side kites so they can infiltrate it. After breaking inside, Riddler and his villains turn against Batman, who tells Kite Man to activate the jet-propelled inverse parachutes in their packs, making the villains ascend to be captured by Alfred Pennyworth in the Bat-Blimp. After a scuffle, the Riddler then reveals that the creation of Kite Man, and his own defeat at Kite Man's hands, was part of an unsuccessful plan to solve the Joker's depression and make him laugh again.

== Other versions ==
=== DC x Sonic the Hedgehog: Metal Legion ===
Kite Man appears in DC x Sonic the Hedgehog: Metal Legion.

=== Flashpoint ===
An alternate timeline version of Kite Man makes a cameo appearance in Flashpoint: Batman Knight of Vengeance as one of several supervillains who had been killed by Batman.

== In other media ==
=== Television ===
- Kite Man appears in Batman: The Brave and the Bold, voiced by Jeffrey Combs. As a boy, this version was obsessed with Benjamin Franklin and attempted to recreate his famous kite experiment. However, he failed to take adequate safety precautions and the subsequent electrical shock psychologically traumatized him, forcing him into crime. Throughout his appearances, he battles Batman before he and Rubberneck were petrified by a theta beam gun he developed to defeat Plastic Man.
  - Additionally, an unnamed, heroic, alternate universe variant of Kite Man makes a non-speaking cameo appearance in the episode "Deep Cover for Batman!".
- Kite Man appears in Harley Quinn, voiced by Matt Oberg. This version is a dimwitted but usually well-meaning criminal known for his catchphrase "Kite Man, hell yeah!" and for trying to pick up women. Additionally, he is the son of metahuman parents, Darryl and Wendy Brown, who are disappointed with their son for not having powers like them. During the first two seasons, he serves as Poison Ivy's love interest until he breaks up with her after realizing that Ivy does not truly reciprocate his feelings. As of the third season, he has begun dating Golden Glider.
  - Kite Man appears in the spin-off Kite Man: Hell Yeah!, voiced again by Oberg.
- Kite Man makes a non-speaking cameo appearance in the DC Super Hero Girls episode "#LeagueOfShadows".

=== Film ===
- Kite Man makes a minor appearance in The Lego Batman Movie.
- James Gunn, director of The Suicide Squad, briefly considered adding Kite Man to the titular team, but eventually decided against it, believing it was not "the freshest way to go". However, he remained open to an appearance in a sequel.

=== Video games ===
- Kite Man appears as a character summon in Scribblenauts Unmasked: A DC Comics Adventure.
- Kite Man appears as a playable character in Lego DC Super-Villains, voiced again by Jeffrey Combs. This version is a member of the Legion of Doom.
- Kite Man appears in Lego Batman: Legacy of the Dark Knight.

== See also ==
- List of Batman family enemies
