= Nicotinism =

Nicotinism may refer to:

- Nicotine dependence
- Nicotine poisoning

== See also ==
- Nicotine (disambiguation)
