= List of Superman enemies =

Various enemies of Superman, as they appear on the cover of Superman Villains: Secret Files and Origins#1 (June 1998, art by Dan Jurgens)

This is a list of supervillains appearing in DC Comics who are or have been enemies of the superhero Superman. Several of Superman's opponents (most notably Darkseid and Brainiac) are or have been foes of the Justice League as well. Due to his long publication history and broad scope of activities, Superman's adversaries exist in every known capacity: humans, metahumans, androids, sorcerers, empowered animals, other aliens (such as Kryptonians), mythical/supernatural creatures, corrupt doppelgängers of himself (imposters, clones, or parallel universe counterparts), interdimensional beings (Mr. Mxyzpltk, Vyndktvx), and even deities.

== Central rogues gallery ==
In alphabetical order (with issue and date of first appearance):

Villain	First appearance	Description
Anti-Monitor	Crisis on Infinite Earths #2 (May 1985)	The villain behind Crisis on Infinite Earths, an event that rebooted the DC Multiverse. The Anti-Monitor is one of the most powerful beings in the DC Multiverse. This character has a strong metafictional nature.
Atomic Skull	Superman #323 (September 1976)	Albert Michaels was given radiation treatments that gave him atomic eye-blasts and worked his way up from an agent of SKULL to becoming its leader.
Atomic Skull	The Adventures of Superman #483 (October 1991)	Joseph Martin's superhuman powers manifested after exposure to the Dominators' gene-bomb; the film buff began to hallucinate that he was a 1930s movie hero called the Atomic Skull and that Superman was his nemesis.
Bizarro	Superboy #68 (October 1958)	Bizarro was created when Superboy was exposed to a "duplicating ray" and was later destroyed in the same story.
Bizarro	Action Comics #254 (July 1959)	Lex Luthor exposed Kal-El, now Superman, to another duplicating ray, this time creating an adult Bizarro. This Bizarro later created a Bizarro Lois Lane and left with her into space. In accordance with the science fiction concepts of Superman stories of the era, Bizarro relocated to "the Bizarro World," a cubical planet called Htrae (Earth spelled backwards) which operated under "Bizarro logic" (e.g., it was a crime to do anything good or right) and which Bizarro populated with duplicates of himself and Bizarro Lois Lane, as well as Bizarro versions of Superman's supporting cast and the other DC heroes and villains.
Bizarro	The Man of Steel #5 (December 1986)	Bizarro was a flawed clone created by Lex Luthor's staff of scientists.
Bizarro	Superman (vol. 2) #160 (September 2000)	Post-Crisis, another Bizarro was created when the Joker conned Mr. Mxyzptlk out of 99% of his powers and created a Bizarro World.
Bloodsport (Robert DuBois)	Superman (vol. 2) #4 (April 1987)	A gun-toting mercenary with Kryptonite bullets.
Brainiac	Action Comics #242 (July 1958)	Brainiac is an alien cyborg or android from the planet Colu and one of the most dangerous villains in the DC Universe. He utilizes advanced weaponry (such as force fields and shrinking rays) and is capable of physically matching or overpowering Superman as well as creating and manipulating computer systems.
Bruno Mannheim	Superman's Pal Jimmy Olsen #139 (July 1971)	Mannheim is one of Metropolis' most powerful gangsters and the leader of Intergang.
Cyborg Superman	The Adventures of Superman #466 (May 1990)	Hank Henshaw is an astronaut who died as a result of a doomed mission on board the space shuttle Excalibur. Because Superman failed to save him, Hank Henshaw blames him for the loss of his original body, as well as the death of his wife. Reduced to a formless entity that inhabits mechanical bodies, the Cyborg desires to cause Superman equal pain. Henshaw masqueraded as a resurrected Superman after the hero's apparent death, claiming to be the result of Superman's remains being reconstructed into cybernetic form.
Cyborg Superman	Action Comics #252 (May 1959)	Zor-El was introduced as the new Cyborg Superman following The New 52, a relaunch of the DC Universe. Zor-El was rescued from Krypton's destruction by Brainiac and was reconfigured as a cyborg to be his scout for looking for stronger species in the universe.
Darkseid	Superman's Pal Jimmy Olsen #134 (December 1970)	Uxas, son of Heggra, alien dictator of the planet Apokolips. As with gods in other mythologies, Darkseid is incredibly powerful, but cannot escape his ultimate destiny. It has been foretold that Darkseid will meet his final defeat at the hands of his son, Orion, in a cataclysmic battle. According to writer Mark Evanier, creator Jack Kirby modeled Darkseid on actor Jack Palance.
Doomsday	Superman: The Man of Steel #18 (November 1992)	The creature who killed Superman in a titanic battle that also resulted in Doomsday's death, although Doomsday comes back to life every time he dies, and even more powerful. Created by an ancient genetic experiment on Krypton.
Eradicator	Action Comics Annual #2 (1989)	A powerful artificial intelligence from Krypton, the Eradicator program initially sought to xenoform Earth into a new Krypton. Since then, it has merged with human scientist David Conner, serving as a replacement Superman after his apparent death and later as an ally to Superman himself.
Faora	Action Comics #471 (May 1977)	A Kryptonian martial artist and man-hater who was sent to the Phantom Zone for murdering several men, she is able to beat Superman using her knowledge of Horo-kanu, a Kryptonian martial art enabling the user to immobilize an opponent via pressure points.
General Zod	Adventure Comics #283 (April 1961)	General Dru-Zod is one of Superman's more prominent enemies. Once the Military Director of the Kryptonian Space Center, Zod had personally known Jor-El when he was an aspiring scientist. Zod attempted to take over Krypton using a machine that produced Bizarro-like duplicates during a period of turmoil caused by the termination of the space program; he was sentenced to the Phantom Zone for his crimes.
General Zod	The Adventures of Superman #444 (September 1988)	A General Zod based on the previous version created by the Time Trapper in a pocket dimension.
General Zod	Superman (vol. 2) #166 (January 2001)	Head of the Kryptonian military in an alternate reality created by Brainiac 13.
General Zod	Action Comics #779 (July 2001)	A Russian child who developed powers similar to Superman during an experiment. Zod gains power from red sunlight and becomes weak in yellow, the opposite of Superman.
General Zod	Superman (vol. 2) #204 (June 2004)	Created from the artificial Metropia constructed by Superman that claimed to be from Krypton.
General Zod	Action Comics #845 (January 2007)	Following Jor-El's belief that Krypton was doomed and attempting to usurp the ruling council, Zod and his compatriots Non and Ursa were captured and sentenced to the Phantom Zone with Jor-El, their jailer. Having escaped the Phantom Zone with his allies, Zod's new objective is to reclaim his son, Lor-Zod, who was adopted by Superman and Lois Lane and named Chris Kent.
Intergang	Superman's Pal Jimmy Olsen #133 (October 1970)	A nationwide organized crime syndicate armed with weapons supplied in part by Darkseid, led by Bruno Mannheim.
Jax-Ur	(Pre-Crisis) Adventure Comics #289 (October 1961)	Jax-Ur is an amoral and criminally deviant Kryptonian scientist who was imprisoned in the Phantom Zone for destroying Wegthor, a populated moon of Krypton with a population of 500, while experimenting with a nuclear warhead-equipped rocket.
Jax-Ur	(Post-Crisis) Action Comics #846 (February 2007)	In post-Crisis continuity, Jax-Ur destroyed Krypton's moon during an attempt at interstellar space travel. When the moon was destroyed, Brainiac became aware of Krypton and attacked Kandor, killing millions and shrinking the city, then placing it into a bottle. Jax-Ur subsequently became the first prisoner banished to the Phantom Zone.
Lex Luthor	Action Comics #23 (May 1940)	Superman's archenemy, and the consummate evil genius. He continues to play different roles in various Superman comics and media. Originally depicted as a mad scientist, Luthor was later reimagined as a wealthy CEO/scientist of LexCorp who hides his sociopathic tendencies behind a mask of philanthropy. Luthor eventually manipulates his way to the U.S. Presidency, but is forcibly unseated from office by Superman and the Justice League.
Livewire	Superman Adventures #5 (Note: The character's first comic book appearance is Superman Adventures #5 (March, 1997), which is set in the DC Animated Universe. Livewire's first appearance in the mainstream DC Universe was in Action Comics #835 (March 2006).) (March, 1997)	Leslie Willis was originally created for Superman: The Animated Series before being incorporated into the comics. Once a popular and controversial Metropolis radio shock jock, Willis gained electrical superpowers along with pale skin and blue hair after an accident where she was struck by lightning during a public performance. In the comics, Willis was born with superpowers and gained her current appearance after being struck by lightning.
Lobo	Omega Men #3 (June 1983)	A bounty hunter and the last member of the alien Czarnians.
Manchester Black	Action Comics #775 (March 2001)	A British telepath and antihero, he dislikes what he perceives as Superman's simplistic view of the world and becomes obsessed with twisting and destroying Superman's morality. He later learns Superman's true identity and manipulates a large group of supervillains to attack Superman and his known family/friends/associates. When even this manipulation, climaxed with tricking Superman into thinking he has killed Lois Lane, fails to break Superman's spirit, he retreats completely and ends his life over the anguish of his failure.
Mercy Graves	Superman Adventures #1 (November 1996) (Note: Mercy Graves was originally introduced in the Superman: The Animated Series episode "A Little Piece of Home", which first aired on September 14, 1996. The character's first comic book appearance is Superman Adventures #1 (November 1996), which is set in the DC Animated Universe. Mercy's first appearance in the mainstream DC Universe was in Detective Comics #735 (August 1999).)	Lex Luthor's personal assistant, who manages LexCorp during his absence.
Metallo	Action Comics #252 (May 1959)	Former mercenary John Corben was transformed into a powerful cyborg with a heart made out of kryptonite. He seeks to use this power source as the instrument of Superman's downfall.
Metallo	Superman #310 (April 1977)	Roger Corben, John Corben's brother, had his brain transferred into a similar robotic body as his brother by SKULL.
Mongul	DC Comics Presents #27 (November 1980)	Ruler of the gladiatorial planet Warworld, Mongul's strength rivals that of Superman and he has often attempted to break him.
Mongul	(unnamed) Showcase '95 #8 (September 1995) (as Mongul) Superman (vol. 2) #151 (December 1999)	Mongul's son who has since taken up the mantle, as has his daughter Mongal.
Morgan Edge	Superman's Pal Jimmy Olsen #133 (October 1970)	A corrupt corporate executive, he tried to take control of Intergang and organized the post-Crisis iteration of the Superman Revenge Squad.
Mister Mxyzptlk	Superman #30 (September 1944)	An imp from the Fifth Dimension, Mr. Mxyzptlk possesses nigh-limitless reality-bending powers, which he often uses to pose challenges to Superman for his own amusement.
Parasite	Action Comics #340 (August 1966)	Raymond Maxwell Jensen is a worker at a research plant who stumbles upon waste collected by Superman and is transformed into a purple-skinned monster that lives off the energy of others.
Parasite	Firestorm #58 (April 1987)	Rudy Jones, a S.T.A.R. Labs janitor, is manipulated by Darkseid into a similar situation that created the original Parasite, becoming green-skinned (however his skin eventually became purple, like the original Parasite, due to attempts made by doctors to cure his condition).
Prankster	Action Comics #51 (August 1942)	The Prankster (Oswald Hubert Loomis) was a criminal; his particular gimmick was the use of various practical jokes and gags in committing his crimes. In the early 2000s, he began using high-tech weaponry.
Professor Hamilton	The Adventures of Superman #424 (January 1987)	Emil Hamilton, a mad scientist from S.T.A.R. Labs; he spent years as Superman's ally, but he later turned to evil and joined the Secret Society of Super Villains.
Silver Banshee	Action Comics #595 (December 1987)	A Gaelic woman trapped in a version of Limbo for decades by magic after she was double-crossed by a clan chief, then emerged with magic powers and vowed to track down his descendants for revenge. Her scream drains the life out of others.
Superboy-Prime	DC Comics Presents #87 (November 1985)	Clark Kent was born on a parallel world akin to the real world that was destroyed during Crisis on Infinite Earths, Superboy-Prime was trapped outside time for decades. However, his faith in Earth's heroes was destroyed by decades of their mistakes, and he emerged from a pocket dimension to try to replace Superman. This character has a strong metafictional nature.
Titano	Superman #127 (February 1959)	A colossal chimpanzee with kryptonite vision. Post-Crisis, he was a test monkey transformed by a genetic experiment gone awry.
Toyman	Action Comics #64 (September 1943)	The Toyman (Winslow Percival Schott) uses toy-based or toy-themed devices and gimmicks in his various crimes. The Toyman's weapons, while sometimes comical, are also very dangerous.
Ultra-Humanite	Action Comics #13 (July 1939)	Ultra-Humanite is the first supervillain ever faced by Superman and one of the first of the Golden Age of Comics. He was designed to be the polar opposite of Superman: while Superman is a hero with superhuman strength, Ultra-Humanite is a criminal mastermind who has a crippled body but a highly advanced intellect. Jerry Siegel and Joe Shuster retired Ultra-Humanite as Superman's arch-enemy when Lex Luthor was introduced. Ultra-Humanite was thus retired for several decades, only to return as an enemy of the Superman of Earth-Two and the Justice Society of America. Ultra-Humanite has developed a process of transplanting his mind into different bodies, first doing this with actress Delores Winters when he was nearly killed, most famously with an albino ape, and also with Johnny Thunder.
Ultraman	Justice League of America #29 (August 1964)	An evil counterpart of Superman from an alternate Earth, Ultraman possesses powers similar to Superman's. Ultraman's power source is through exposure to kryptonite, while the Earth's yellow sun weakens him. Ultraman is the leader of the Crime Syndicate of America, a villainous version of the Justice League native to his universe. His power levels are equal to or greater than Superman's as long as his exposure to kryptonite is maintained; if he does not regularly consume it, his strength will decrease. If he is exposed to yellow sunlight for too long, his powers fade.

== Foes of lesser renown ==
In alphabetical order (with issue and date of first appearance):

Villain	First appearance	Description
Aarbur-Z	Action Comics #383 (December 1969)	Disembodied intelligence inhabiting super-powered costume, pursued by similar entity Enforcer NZ-2, attempted to possess Superman.
Acid Master	Action Comics #348 (March 1967)	Philip Master is a chemist and saboteur who allied with forces behind the Iron Curtain.
Aethyr	The Phantom Zone #3 (March 1982)	A godlike entity from the Phantom Zone who was created from the fusion of millions of souls.
Adversary	The Adventures of Superman #579 (June 2000)	Cary Richards is a young child neighbor of Clark and Lois who uses a wheelchair. He made a deal with the demon Lord Satanus to gain psionic powers, subconsciously becoming a stereotypical macho 1990s supervillain (musclebound, wearing leather with metal spikes, spouting profanities, chewing a cigar) named the Adversary that wanted to develop a reputation defeating Superman in a similar fashion to Doomsday.
Alex Evell	Superman #5 (summer 1940)	Corrupt politician who forces publisher Zachary Collum to sell the Morning Pictorial to him to help him take over the city. He uses it to lie about his enemies, and when Daily Planet publisher Burt Mason refuses to stop a story by Clark Kent about his lies and will not sell the paper he declares war against the Planet. His men attack delivery trucks, steal papers and attack those selling them, but Superman helps the Planet and stops the thugs. Knowing Superman is fond of Lois, he calls her to say Clark has been badly injured and is calling for Lois at Bentley Hospital. When she gets to the hospital she is kidnapped, although Superman follows. Bentley sets the place on fire, despite two of his gang members being in there, but Superman escapes, rescues the gangsters and stops Evel's car. Bentley says that he will not talk, but the thugs say that they will get even with him. Superman leaves them at a police station, Collum gets his paper back and Evell goes to prison.
Amalak	Superman #190 (October 1966)	Alien bounty hunter whose planet was once conquered by Krypton during an imperial phase of its history.
Amalak	Superman #669 (December 2007)	His people wiped out by Admiral Zod, Amalak dedicated his life to eradicating all Kryptonian life from existence.
Amazing Grace	Superman (vol. 2) #3 (March 1987)	A servant of Darkseid, she uses her powers of persuasion to maintain his control of Apokolips.
Amazo	The Brave and the Bold #30 (June 1960)	An android with powers similar to those of the Parasite, except that he duplicates their abilities instead of absorbing them.
Amok	Superman: The 10¢ Adventure (2003)	It is known that he was born in Iceland, but how he achieved his metahuman super-strength and energy powers is not yet known.
Amphi-Bandits	Action Comics #90 (November 1945)	Inventor-turned-criminal Horace Rikker led this gang who evaded police pursuit via a secret submersible vehicle in a Metropolis river.
Andrar	Superboy #164 (April 1970)	Superboy enemy; led the Crab Nebulan attempt to invade Earth with android duplicates.
Annihilator and Annihilator Jr.	Action Comics #355-357 (October–December 1967)	Defecting scientist from the Iron Curtain, he utilized Kryptonian explosives, briefly ruled the U.S. As the madness of his condition faded, his adopted son took a drink of the explosives and gained similar powers.
Anomaly	The Adventures of Superman #539 (October 1996)	Created by Project Cadmus, a Anomaly is a clone of a felon. However, he was altered to have the power to mimic the substance of his surroundings.
Archer	Superman #13 (December 1941)	Quigley, first name unrevealed. Extortionist and archer who targets millionaires, shooting them with a bow and arrow if they do not pay. Superman starts to pursue him and prevents him from shooting Lois and Jimmy. He is revealed to be a hunter who decided to hunt humans instead of animals.
Atlas	1st Issue Special #1 (April 1975)	A former one-shot Jack Kirby character who was later revamped as a morally ambiguous anti-hero. Atlas wields a crystal that gives him strength comparable to Superman's.
Atom Man	World's Finest #271 (September 1981)	Heinrich Melch is a Nazi super-soldier on Earth-Two who gained his powers through his father's experiments with Green Kryptonite. After a fight with Superman, Melch was somehow transported to Earth-One where he gained new powers and assumed the alias of Henry Miller. He was defeated by Superman and Batman who managed to send him back to Earth-Two. Atom Man's powers faded and he was apprehended by Earth-Two's Superman and Robin.
Auctioneer	Action Comics #841 (September 2006)	A gigantic alien who uses advanced technology to collect valuable items and beings to auction to the highest bidder.
Baron Sunday	Superman (vol. 2) #26 (December 1988)	A villain who uses Voodoo magic against Superman.
Barrage	Superman (vol. 2) Annual #2 (1988)	Karnowsky is an armored criminal who came into conflict with Superman when he attacked Maggie Sawyer and would go on to join the Superman Revenge Squad.
Baud	Superman: The Man of Steel #71 (September 1997)	A female energy being who worked for Mainframe as a spy and fought Superman as part of the Superman Revenge Squad.
Big Dome	Batman #307 (January 1979)	Large-headed purple-skinned being, possible extraterrestrial, planned planetary conquest from Earth base, defeated by Superman with civilian assistance.
Blackie Sarto	New York World's Fair Comics #2 (1940)	A jewel thief who enters the World Fair in an attempt to steal the Madras Emerald, one of the world's biggest jewels which is being delivered from India. Clark Kent recognises him and tells Lois Lane, and when she tells him Pinkerton checks on criminals and will not let them on, Clark says he covered a story four years ago in London where he was a suspect, but released on lack of evidence. With his super-hearing Clark hears him talking about stealing the Madras Emerald to a thug and tells Lois he has a hunch. Lois evades him and follows Sarto, who realises she is following and kidnaps her by seizing her and threatening to shoot her. He takes her to a car where two accomplices are waiting. Clark realises she tried following Sarto and changes into Superman. Meanwhile, Lois is taken to Sarto's riverfront hideaway. Sarto says they will decide how to get rid of her when they get back and Lois is left bound and gagged. Sarto's gang throws deadly gas bombs at the armoured car delivering the Emerald while wearing gas masks, but Superman stops them despite Sarto trying to kill them all with a gas bomb. Superman saves the crooks and takes them unconscious to the police. He then flies to the building and frees Lois, then takes her to the fair and delivers the gem. He then wires the story to the editor as Clark Kent.
Blackrock	Action Comics #458 (April 1976)	A man equipped with an alien rock which gives him energy-manipulation powers.
Blaze and Satanus	Action Comics #655 (July 1990)	Lady Blaze is the half-demon daughter of the wizard Shazam.
Blaze and Satanus	The Adventures of Superman #493 (August 1992)	Lord Satanus, the half-demon son of the wizard Shazam, resembled a traditional demon, save that he wore a heavy Roman-style helmet and either had black skin or else the helmet buried his face in shadow. He and his sister Lady Blaze fought for possession of Lady Blaze's domain, using Superman as a pawn. At the end of the story, it was revealed that Lord Satanus was disguised as "Collin Thornton", the publisher of Newstime magazine, who had first appeared in Adventures of Superman #460 (Nov. 1989) and had previously hired Clark Kent as editor.
Black Zero (supervillain)	Superman #205 (1968)	The original Black Zero was a space saboteur who destroyed planets for pay and was the man responsible for destroying Krypton. He was erased from existence following Crisis on Infinite Earths.
Black Zero (supervillain)	Superboy (vol. 4) #61	In an alternate reality in which Superman never returned from the dead, Superboy (Conner Kent) became the new Black Zero and took control of Earth by force.
Bloodsport (Alex Trent)	The Adventures of Superman #506 (November 1993)	A white supremacist, Alex Trent uses similar technology to the first Bloodsport.
Bloodthirst	Superman: The Man of Steel #29 (January 1994)	A massive alien creature with multiple holes on his skin that emit a green gas. His weapon appeared to be a circular device like a clock without hands that he could use to slow down or even to stop time. Bloodthirst bragged throughout his first and (to date) only appearance that he was the cause of every major war and was there at every assassination. Bloodthirst was easily defeated by Superman and left Earth. Bloodthirst has not been seen or mentioned since. His storyline is similar to Cerberus who was mentioned in Superman: The Man of Steel #1, then was finally seen in #4 and not seen afterward.
Borden Moseley	Superman #5 (summer 1940)	A financier who is in league with Lex Luthor. Luthor places narcotics around some of the country's most powerful men, taking control of their minds and allowing him to throw the country into depression. Moseley gets business tips from Luthor, although Luthor gets 75% of his profits. Superman finds out about Moseley and gets a list from his safe of those under Luthor's control, despite Moseley trying to lock him in the safe. Moseley tries to commit suicide by leaping from the window, but Superman saves him. He disguises himself as Moseley by contorting his face, a power which he used to use, and infiltrates Luthor's meeting. Luthor realises Superman is there and threatens to shoot those under his control, but Superman stops him and he apparently dies after a plane crash, although he returns later. Those under his control are freed and Moseley is presumably arrested, although it is possible he committed suicide after Superman left.
Calvin Denby	Superman #12 (September–October 1941)	After a series of explosions at American defense industries, Superman rounds up members of the Grotak Bund, an organization that has orders to destroy certain American factories to seriously slow down U.S. defence operations. Lois Lane goes to one factory but is seized by a criminal and prevented from speaking. The criminals bind her hand and foot and gag her next to dynamite, hoping her remains will be found and she will be blamed. However, Superman stops the bomb in time. Lois goes to see Calvin Denby, who claims to be a patriotic American and is about to give his view on the attacks. Superman realises he is the Leader of the Grotak Bund and when Denby fires at Lois he deflects the bullet, stunning Calvin, who is jailed.
Chameleon	Action Comics #126 (November 1948)	A master of disguise.
Chandu	Adventure Comics #219 (December 1955)	Superboy enemy; a giant gorilla who gained x-ray/heat vision from drinking powdered kryptonite. Chandu employed by Doc Baird and his gang for crimes.
Chemo	Showcase #39 (July–August 1962)	A giant, semi-intelligent, humanoid and artificial being with superhuman strength, durability and regenerative capabilities and the ability to produce and expel numerous chemical solutions.
Colonel Future	Action Comics #484 (June 1978)	Edmund H. Future uses his gang to steal the most advanced technology and employ its use in his crimes.
Colonel Future	Superman #378 (December 1982)	Edmund Hamilton is a NASA scientist who, through a freak accident, developed the ability to glimpse into the future by surviving near-death experiences. He uses this knowledge to develop an arsenal to steal components to prevent an event that would destroy the Earth. He reappears in a later story trying to save Superman from an assassination attempt, only to find out that he himself (in a Superman costume) would be the victim, and is saved by Superman performing CPR. The character and his alter ego are a homage to science fiction author Edmond Hamilton and his most famous work, Captain Future.
Composite Superman	World's Finest Comics #142 (June 1964)	An out-of-work diver, Joseph Meach gained the combined powers of the Legion of Super-Heroes after being struck by the energy discharge of their statues. He then desired to defeat Superman and Batman. However, the effects eventually wore off. Later, they are given back by an alien whose father was imprisoned by the two heroes, but when he turned back, he sacrificed himself to save Superman and Batman from the Magna-Gun that the alien had shot at them.
Conduit	Superman: The Man of Steel #0 (October 1994)	A bully and rival of Clark Kent's while growing up, Kenny Braverman was exposed to kryptonite radiation as a baby and so became a living kryptonite battery. After years of coming in second to Clark, Braverman becomes determined to kill him and Superman.
Count X	Action Comics #301 (June 1963)	Master spy.
Crime Professor	Superboy #30 (January 1954)	Superboy enemy; Mr. Oates, criminal strategist.
Cyclotronic Man	Black Lightning #3 (July 1977)	A Batman villain formerly called Bag O' Bones who developed new powers, Ned Creegan adopted the identity of the Cyclotronic Man and fought Superman and Black Lightning at the time when he was hired by Tobias Whale of the 100 to kill them.
Dabney Donovan	Superman's Pal Jimmy Olsen #142 (October 1971)	A "mad scientist" and expert at genetic manipulation and cloning, former employee of Project Cadmus.
Carl Draper/the Master Jailer	Superman #331 (January 1979)	Carl Draper, a master trapmaker, was hired to build a trap to contain the Parasite. However, when his daughter Carla challenged him to trap Superman, he wholeheartedly accepted it. He would appear to Superman as a hologram and challenge him to escape the traps he created. Post-Crisis, his powers and skills were enhanced and he was part of an Anti-Kryptonian Brigade with Bizarro, Mongul and the Silver Banshee. He eventually (somewhat) reformed and was employed by Checkmate.
Dev-Em	Adventure Comics #287 (June 1961)	A surviving Kryptonian juvenile delinquent, he kidnapped Superboy and took his place. Years later he time-traveled to the future and became a law-enforcement agent.
Doctor Chaos	The New Adventures of Superboy #25 (January 1982)	Superboy enemy; Burt Belker, Professor Lewis Lang's assistant, empowered and possessed by a Lord of Chaos via the Chaos Helmet from the Valley of Ur.
Dominus	Action Comics #747 (August 1998)	An alien priest who sought the powers of Kismet and brainwashed Superman into conquering Earth.
Duke Duvvil	Adventure Comics #199 (April 1954)	Superboy enemy; traitorous nobleman in subterranean kingdom of Subbania, sought to overthrow Queen Lya.
Duplicate Man	World's Finest #106 (December 1959)	An enemy of Superman and Batman. Capable of splitting himself into two separate bodies.
Duran	Superman (vol. 2) Annual #12 (August 2000)	Created as part of the Planet DC Annuals event, Duran is a Mexican wizard who is a member of the fictional "Oto tribe". Disturbed by the practices of capitalist, anti-environment developers, Duran becomes their sworn enemy and embarks on a career of eco-terrorism. He devises a plan to summon and set loose an army of monsters against the Mexican people to punish them for the pollution they produce. Duran abducts a young girl and takes her to his base under the Plaza de la Constitución in Mexico City, with the intention of using her as the focus of a magical ritual to summon the power of the Aztec god Ometeotl. His plans were foiled by Superman with the assistance of the Mexican heroes Iman, Acrata and El Muerto.
Dyna-Mind	The New Adventures of Superboy #42 (June 1983)	Superboy enemy; Johnny Webber, granted telekinetic powers by meteor, able to create and animate giant figures.
Eclipso	The House of Secrets #61 (August 1963)	The immortal incarnation of the Wrath of God and the Angel of Vengeance who is able to possess people and has a huge variety of magical powers.
Effron the Sorcerer	World's Finest Comics #210 (March 1972)	A sorcerer who came from the magic kingdom of Veliathan and controlled a faceless puppet army.
Elias Orr	Superman Vol. 2 #205 (July 2004)	A mercenary who is Equus' partner.
Emperor of America	Action Comics #52 (September 1942)	Power-mad individual who creates a device which emits rays that take away the will of people to resist. He blankets the nation in the rays, then with just a few henchmen wearing helmets that make them resistant to the ray, he marches into the White House and declares himself the Emperor of America. He takes vast amounts of wealth and even replaces the Supreme Court with his henchmen. Only Superman remains immune and he is finally able to stop the Emperor's plan. The character should not be confused with the Atom (Al Pratt)'s enemy of the same name from All-American Comics #21 (December 1940).
Equus	Superman #206 (August 2004)	A villainous cyborg, working under the direction of Mr. Orr as a mercenary (sometimes for covert elements of the American government).
La Encantadora	Secret Origins of Super-Villains 80-Page Giant (December 1999)	Gaining magic powers from the mystical Mists of Ibella, Lourdes Lucero first encountered Superman while hypnotizing him to react adversely to fake kryptonite.
Erik Drekken	Action Comics (vol. 2) #6 (March 2012)	In search of the secrets of Captain Comet, Erik Drekken mutated himself, becoming a giant ape that attacked Superman only to be defeated. Drekken managed to gain full control over his own DNA, allowing him to either evolve or devolve into any lifeform at will. Drekken later joined the Anti-Superman Army.
Evolution King	Superman #15 (March–April 1942)	An evil scientist who has "learned how to advance or revert a human being’s age" by means of special pills. Aided by gangster Joe Glower and his henchmen, the Evolution King kidnaps prominent athletes, transforms them into helpless old men, and threatens to leave them in their decrepit condition unless they meet his extortion demands. He then starts turning people into infants. Clark realises an old man is a missing athlete due to his fingerprints. Lois Lane is with one of the athletes so is kidnapped with him, blindfolded, and driven to the base. Clark is also captured. Both he and Lois are soon tied to chairs and in the presence of the Evolution King. Goaded finally by Clark Kent into demonstrating the effects of his old-age pills by swallowing one himself, the Evolution King ages, causing Lois to faint. Clark then breaks his bonds and forces the Evolution King to reveal how people can be turned back. The Evolution King dies after accidentally consuming more aging pills instead of the intended antidote.
Faustus Coven	Superboy #175 (June 1971)	Superboy enemy; patriarch of the Coven family, used combination of sorcery and science to separate Superboy's soul from his body and enslave it.
Ferlin Nyxly	Superman #235 (March 1971)	Former curator of the Metropolis Music Museum who, on some occasions, has attacked Superman with the help of magical objects or alien technology he found or stole.
Futuremen	Superman #128 (April 1959)	Two criminals, Vard and Boka, from the year 2000 travel back in time, and claim to an incredibly gullible FBI chief that Superman is a criminal from their time. They capture him using red kryptonite, and reveal an atomic experiment has dried up Earth's water supply and they want Superman to restore it with ice from Saturn, hoping to get billions from Earth. Superman escapes them, has them jailed by the authorities of the year 2000 and then returns to 1959.
Gaff Lomar	Superboy #27 (August–September 1953)	Superboy enemy; "pied piper" who mesmerized Smallville's children into following him.
Gog	The Kingdom #1 (February 1999)	In a possible future timeline, a boy called William was the sole survivor of the destruction of Kansas in a nuclear blast. Saved by Superman, he came to view Superman as a savior and became a minister of a church devoted to him. When Superman tried to correct this misguided view, William came to see him instead as a demon whose failure had led to Kansas' destruction. Empowered by the cosmic beings known as the Quintessence, Gog has traveled across the dimensions of Hypertime, slaying versions of Superman wherever he finds them.
Galactic Golem	Superman #248 (February 1972)	An artificial construct created by Lex Luthor that was used by him twice to fight Superman. It was erased from history after Crisis on Infinite Earths.
Gambler	Superboy #140 (July 1967)	Superboy enemy; "Lucky" Lucifer Chancel, gangster and obsessive gambler, engineered crises for Superboy to face, then accepted bets on the results.
Gem	Superboy #19 (April–May 1952)	Superboy enemy; a.k.a. the Crystalloid, crystalline life-form that consumes all in its path.
Glowman	(as Bashford) Superboy #157 (June 1969); (as Glowman) New Adventures of Superboy #30 (June 1982)	Superboy enemy; Bradley "Bash" Bashford, Smallville High bully transformed into a monstrous fiery form.
Goldie Gates	Superman #27 (March–April 1944)	The notorious Goldie Gates convinces Randall Rocksell that if he will invest huge sums of money with him, Rocksell will make half a million dollars a day on his investment. However, Superman discovers that Rocksell is being paid dividends with his own money and Gates is perilously close to gaining the power of attorney over Rocksell's money and property. When Randall fully believes that Gates will make him money, he gives him access to his vault, after which Goldie takes the money. Superman sees the crooks and recognizes one as Bucktooth Burger, one of Goldie Gates' mob. Later, Gates' crooks get into Randall's house, where he and Lois are talking. Bucktooth points a gun at Lois and Goldie says that she will be shot unless Randall signs a document giving him control over his property. Despite Lois telling him not to, Randall signs. Bucktooth then crams a cloth into Lois's mouth to gag her and Randall is knocked out. He comes to in an underground room with Lois next to him. Both of them are tied to a log. Goldie plans for them both to be killed by dynamite. However, Superman gets to the room and stops the dynamite from exploding. Meanwhile, the crooks think that they will be unable to get out of the tunnel in time. They are relieved to see Superman, who then takes them off to jail. Randall, meanwhile, becomes a better person.
Grax	Action Comics #342 (October 1966)	Brainiac's blue-skinned, four-armed rival featuring a 20th-level intellect (as opposed to Brainiac's 12th-level intellect) whose plots are also foiled by Superman and who seeks vengeance. He also appeared in the Super Friends comic book.
Harkon	Superboy #194 (April 1973)	Superboy enemy; renegade Atlantean/merman scientist, temporarily transformed Superboy into a merboy.
Hellgrammite	The Brave and the Bold #80 (October–November 1968)	Roderick Rose transforms himself into a large insectoid creature and has battled Superman several times since.
The Host	Superman (vol. 2) #6 (June 1987)	A construct containing the souls of a long-lost prehuman race.
Illena	Superman's Girl Friend, Lois Lane #52 (October 1964)	Alien woman, romanced Superman with intent to turn him into stone.
Ignition	The Adventures of Superman #582 (September 2000)	Created by the Joker after he stole the powers of Mr. Mxyzptlk. Later became ally/underling of the Russian General Zod, guarding Pokolistan.
Insect Queen	(Pre-Crisis, Earth-One) Superboy #124 (October 1965) (Pre-Crisis, Earth-Two) Superman Family #213 (December 1981) (Post-Crisis) Superman #671 (February 2008)	Pre-Crisis, the Earth-One Lana Lang saves an alien that gives her a ring that offered her the powers of any insect or arachnid and becomes a superhero. Post-Crisis, Earth-Two Lana Lang receives a magical scarab from her archaeological father that possesses her and offers the power to enlarge and control insects, becoming a supervillain. Also post-Crisis, the Insect Queen is an alien who assists Lex Luthor in return for his assistance into colonizing Earth. She uses Lana Lang's DNA to make a new body mixed with her own genetic material. She would later return, possessing Lana's body.
J. Wilbur Wolfingham	Superman #26 (January–February 1944)	A notorious confidence man whose elaborate schemes are interfered with by Superman to profit his victim while he is left with nothing. On one occasion he placed oil in a well to con the Eden Farming Community, an area recently hit by a tornado. He then bought the land and claimed that there was an oil well on it, after which the locals paid in cash for shares in it. Lois and Clark told them who Wilbur really was and they started searching the area for him. Lois found him in a barn and told him to give himself up, but he seized her, covering her mouth to prevent her from speaking. He then bound and gagged her and lowered her into the well. He said she would probably be found before she starved, but by then he would be gone. He then hid in a haystack, but a match dropped by him set the oil alight. The flames then started burning through the rope holding Lois up. Clark saw where she was with his X-ray vision, changed into Superman and saved her just as the rope snapped. He then burrowed underground to escape the explosion from the layer of oil, freed Lois, then found a genuine oil well which he diverted to the town. After this he captures Wilbur, who was stuck in the burning haystack, and makes him return the money to the people, who will now become rich due to the oil.
J. E. Curtis	Superman #4 (spring 1940)	An agent paid by a foreign power to stop the nation's return to prosperity, which is happening after the Great Depression. His men cause incidents in industry to cause strikes. Superman investigates and stops the attacks. He gets to the boss, who tries to poison him, then when Superman is not killed, he tells Superman about Curtis. Curtis is about to make a call to agents in the stock market to cause the worst depression in American history, but Superman enters with the other crook. Curtis kills the man with a device that fires electrical bolts and tries to kill Superman after Superman refuses his offer to join him. But Superman is unharmed and touches Curtis, electrocuting and killing him.
Imperiex	Superman (vol. 2) #153 (February 2000)	An all-powerful force of nature whose purpose is destroying galaxies, planning to create a new universe. Eventually, Superman, Steel, and Darkseid stopped Imperiex by using Doomsday as an ally, along with a powerful weapon called the Entropy Aegis.
Kalibak	New Gods #1 (February 1971)	The son of Darkseid.
Kancer	Action Comics #777 (May 2001)	Created from a sliver of kryptonite-induced cancer at the behest of the Russian Zod.
Khyber	Superman #657 (December 2006)	Hassan-I-Sabbah, leader of the Hashshashin assassins, is a shadowy figure behind world politics, steering humanity to fall under his rule in the future. Arion reveals to Superman that his presence on Earth has weakened humanity against future threats and in the future, after Superman falls to the cybernetically enhanced Khyber, humanity will die out because of this weakness.
King Kosmos	DC Comics Presents Annual #2 (1983)	A time-traveling despot from the future who comes to the present to conquer it. His efforts are halted by Superman and the mysterious Superwoman, who also makes her premiere appearance and is, in reality, time traveler Kristin Wells.
Klaxxu	The Superman Family #197 (September–October 1979)	Superboy enemy; extraterrestrial exiled to Earth for attempting to overthrow his planet's government, posed as teacher at Smallville High, used mind-melder device in attempt to convince Superboy he was Klaxxu's fellow subversive.
Kokra	The New Adventures of Superboy #2 (February 1980)	Superboy enemy; Middle Eastern demon who possessed Prof. Lewis Lang (Lana's father).
Kosmon the Hunter	Adventure Comics #266 (November 1959)	Superboy enemy; alien hunter, captured Krypto and used shapechanging protoplasm creature to lure Superboy into battle.
Kronn	Adventure Comics #308 (May 1963)	Superboy enemy; criminal Atlantean scientist, allied with Luthor to transmit mass hypnotic illusions to Smallville.
Kru-El	Superman's Pal Jimmy Olsen #62 (July 1962)	In most settings, Superman's villainous cousin.
Kryptonite Man	Superboy #83 (September 1960)	A teenage delinquent who passed through a cloud of kryptonite and gained superpowers. Originally known as the Kryptonite Kid, he changed his name to the Kryptonite Man after reaching adulthood.
Kryptonite Man	Superman #397 (July 1984)	The ruler of an alien race that resided on Krypton 100,000 years ago.
Kryptonite Man	Superman (vol. 2) #43 (May 1990)	A Green Kryptonite-infused clone of Superman created by Simyan and Mokkari.
Kryptonite Man	Superman/Batman #20 (December 2005)	An energy being formed from the latent energy of Major Force combining with the energy from the kryptonite meteor that Captain Atom sacrificed himself to keep it from destroying Earth. This being could hop between bodies, taking a body over and emanate Kryptonite radiation.
Kryptonite Man	Superman #650 (May 2006)	A scientist looking for a way to turn kryptonite into a fuel source; he arrogantly ignores any dangers and is turned into the Kryptonite Man.
Kryptonite Man	Action Comics (vol. 2) #5	Clay Ramsay was a scumbag who Superman stopped from abusing his wife. Wanting revenge, he joined "Project K-Man" and was turned into Kryptonite Man where he fought Superman before being defeated by Steel. After being freed by General Sam Lane, Clay would later become part of the K-Men where he becomes K-Man Green.
Kryptonoid	Superman #328 (October 1978)	A protoplasmic entity who sought revenge against Jor-El by seeking out his son and merging with a Superman Robot and General D. W. Derwent (who blamed Superman for the loss of his arm).
Kuku and Nardu	Superboy #167 (July 1970)	Superboy enemies; circus performers and criminals, used robot elephant to commit crimes.
Kyack	Superman #13 (November–December 1941)	Warrior of subterranean kingdom descended from a pre-Ice Age civilization, sought to conquer surface world, destroyed buildings in prelude to invasion.
Lady Lunar	World's Finest Comics #266 (January 1981)	Stacy Macklin was exposed to the same radiation as the Moonman to become Lady Lunar and troubled Metropolis. It would take the efforts of Superman and Batman to stop her.
Lashina	Mister Miracle #6 (January 1972)	A member of Darkseid's Female Furies.
Laughing Gas Bandits	Adventure Comics #484 (August 1981)	Three men, used nitrous oxide laced with kryptonite in effort to immobilize Metropolis.
Leader	Adventure Comics #277 (October 1960)	Superboy enemy; with two fellow aliens, fought a duel with Superboy, with potential invasion of Earth as the stakes.
Lelia	Superman #13 (December 1941)	Lelia is a secret agent whose allies captured, tortured, and killed scientist Charle Pierson to gain control of a weapon he created.
Leopard	Superman #20 (January–February 1943)	Sam Kennedy, publicity manager for Cosmo's Circus, wore a leopard head mask during a crime spree in which he and his gang used packs of big cats to commit crimes.
Lightning Master	Superman #14 (January–February 1942)	A villain who learns how to control lightning with a special machine and tries to ransom Metropolis for $300,000. He captures Lois Lane twice, first when she goes to hear his ransom demand. She tries to unmask him, but is captured by him and bound hand and foot to a chair. He tries to send electrical bolts at the house to kill her, but Superman rescues her. The second time, he straps her into an electric chair as he prepares to attack Metropolis for not paying the ransom. However, Superman stops this and in the fight the Lightning Master is electrocuted and killed. Though Lightning Master actually survived and later worked with Ian Karkull.
Loophole	The Adventures of Superman #505 (October 1993)	Deke Dickson, a former S.T.A.R. Labs employee; uses technology to open up portals that act as a tunnel through matter.
Lorac-K7	Adventure Comics #250 (July 1958)	Superboy enemy, criminal descendant of Lana Lang, traveled back in time from 2958 to steal cobalt for a cobalt bomb, impersonating Lana while doing so.
Lord Satanis and Syrene	Action Comics #527 (January 1982)	Living in a time millions of years from now where magic has taken the place of science, Lord Satanis led a revolt of sorcerers against the powerful Queen Ambra and killed her. However, he was denied the right to possess her runestone of Merlin when she cast it into the past, out of his reach. Satanis would marry Ambra's daughter Syrene (whom she had with Merlin), who also sought possession of the runestone. Both of them would eventually find the spells necessary to follow the runestone through time and face Superman, who was needed as a component to use it. The couple would attempt to get the runestone several times before finally returning to their own time period.
Lyla	Action Comics #812 (April 2004)	A telepath who pulled Superman into Kandor and stole his powers to escape in hopes of making the people of Earth worship her as a god.
Maaldor the Darklord	DC Comics Presents #56 (April 1983)	An other-dimensional being of incalculable power who wanted to test his strength against Superman and Power Girl. When it became clear Maaldor was too powerful, Superman tricked him into destroying himself, but he instead became a cosmic intelligence. Maaldor would return repeatedly, often seemingly resurrecting from destruction, to face Superman two more times (the second time with Madame Xanadu and the third time with both the Phantom Stranger and the Joker) and then the Green Lantern Corps. He finally perished for good in Crisis on Infinite Earths #10 (January 1986) and has not been seen since.
Magpie	The Man of Steel #3 (November 1986)	A female master jewel thief named Margaret Pye, who targets gems named after birds and replaces them with booby-trapped replicas.
Malleable Man	(as "Skizzle" Shanks) Plastic Man #17 (April–May 1977) (as the Malleable Man) DC Comics Presents #93 (May 1986)	A criminal present when Plastic Man gained his powers, "Skizzle" Shanks later recreated the process to make himself malleable. He manipulated Plastic Man, Elongated Man, and Elastic Lad to battle Superman.
Mask	World's Finest Comics #66 (September–October 1953)	Harry "King" Sapphire, crime czar who wore a lead mask as part of an elaborate scheme to frame Superman for his crimes.
The Masked Stuntman	Adventure Comics #165 (June 1951)	Superboy enemy; Flip Wilson, acrobatic criminal using a stuntman school as a front.
Massacre	The Adventures of Superman #509 (February 1994)	An alien warrior who traveled space as energy seeking a worthy opponent; he died during the Our Worlds at War crossover.
Mechanical Master	The Superman Family #193 (January–February 1979)	Superboy enemy; able to animate machines to do his bidding.
Medini	Action Comics #25 (June 1940)	An Asian hypnotist who performs crimes, using his hypnotism to make people forget them. When he meets Superman, he is weakened by Medini's hypnotic power and is unable to control his powers properly, while Medini leaves with a captive hypnotized Lois Lane, planning to rob a gold shipment to Kentucky from a plane. Superman leaps through the stratosphere, then suddenly down again, the swift descent and sudden atmospheric change restoring his mind to normal. He then stops the plane Medini has robbed from crashing and tells the police where the loot is hidden. It is unknown what happened to Medini, as he is not mentioned to have been arrested or escaped, although Superman is shown throwing the emptied plane onto some of his henchmen, so possibly Medini was also killed.
Microwave Man	Action Comics #487 (September 1978)	Lewis Padgett was a supervillain named the Microwave Man in the 1930s who traveled with aliens through space for 40 years, returning to Earth as an old man. Padgett convinced the aliens to return his youth, although it meant he only had hours to live. His final wish was to defeat Superman, which the hero granted so that Padgett could die happy.
Mighto	Superboy #108 (October 1963)	Superboy enemy; a.k.a. Tim Tates, superpowered alien youth briefly adopted by the Kents prior to their adoption of Kal-El, became spacefaring criminal, returned years later to battle Superboy.
Mind's-Eye	The New Adventures of Superboy (December 1982)	Superboy enemy; seized mental control of Smallville High student body and channeled their energies to empower himself to fight Superboy.
Mister Cipher(s)	Superboy #150 (September 1968)	Superboy enemies; lookalike robots, equipped with explosives, attempted to take over Smallville on behalf of the alien Cybor.
Mister Electronics	Superboy #73 (June 1959)	Superboy enemy; criminal scientist, employed mind-reading device.
Mister Migraine	More Fun Comics #106 (November–December 1945)	Superboy enemy; racketeer.
Mister Ohm	Superman #51 (March–April 1948)	Used electromagnetic plane to draw armored cars into air and take them to his gang's hideout to loot at leisure.
Mister Sinister	Superman #16 (May–June 1942)	Real name Lylo, he is a purple-skinned denizen of the Fourth Dimension, would-be conqueror and failed poet who used advanced technology to abduct buildings with inhabitants to hold for ransom. Not to be confused with the Marvel Comics character of the same name.
Mister Z	Superman (vol. 2) #51 (January 1991)	A mysterious immortal who seeks to trap famous people from history in a mystical crystal. He attempts to entrap Superman, but the Man of Steel manages to destroy the crystal.
Momentus	Superman #355 (January 1981)	Asa Ezaak was a noted author (based on legendary science-fiction writer Isaac Asimov) who could transform into a water-like being capable of controlling gravity after injecting himself with his created potion "Ezaakis". Kidnapping Ezaak-fan Jimmy Olsen because he erroneously thought he was being investigated by the reporter, Momentus died in battle with Superman.
Mongal	(unnamed) Showcase '95 #8 (September 1995) (as Mongal) Superman (vol. 2) #170 (July 2001)	The daughter of the interstellar tyrant Mongul.
Moonman	World's Finest Comics #98 (December 1958)	Superman assists the military by launching astronaut Brice Rogers to travel around the Moon. When Rogers returns to Earth, under the rays of the Moon, he transforms into the supervillain called the Moonman and menaces Superman, Batman and Robin.
Mummer	Adventure Comics #148 (January 1950)	Superboy enemy; costumed criminal, ex-vaudevillian, committed crimes with three "robot dummies".
Nam-Ek	Superman #282 (December 1974)	A Kryptonian who illegally killed two beasts called rondors to develop an elixir for immortality. While it worked, Nam-Ek was transformed into a rondor-like monster and sentenced to the Phantom Zone for his crime. He would escape years later and battle Superman.
Negative Superboy	Superboy #168 (September 1970)	A negative-energy duplicate of Superboy created in a cosmic accident.
Neutron	Action Comics #525 (November 1981)	Nathaniel Tryon was a petty thug and a member of the TNT Trio before an accident transformed him into living nuclear energy.
Nick O'Teen	Superman vs. Nick O'Teen (1980)	A villain who tries to get children to smoke cigarettes.
Nimrod the Hunter	Action Comics (vol. 2) #6 (April 2012)	A gamesman of uncanny skill, Maxim Zarov gained a deserved reputation as the finest big game hunter on Earth. As his skill and reputation grew, so did his pride, and he believed he had reached the logical end of his career, until one of his beaters convinced him to try to kill the alien Superman. Intrigued, Nimrod took the challenge.
Njllnans	The New Adventures of Superboy #40 (April 1983)	Superboy enemies; N’ll, Vrt and others attempted to make Superboy into a "living robot" as their pawn in conquering Earth.
N.R.G.-X	(Pre-Crisis) Superman #339 (September 1979); (Post-Crisis) Superman/Batman #68 (March 2010)	Pre-Crisis: Grant Haskill was transformed into a living robot by an explosion. At one point, he accidentally turned the Man of Steel into actual steel. Post-Crisis: Miguel Diaz and Ray Ryker were two physicists until a nuclear experiment goes wrong. Diaz is caught in an explosion that transfers his essence into the mechanical being, N.R.G.-X (Nuclear Radiation Generator - Experimental). Confused and trying to escape, he confronts Superman encasing him in a steel shell. N.R.G.-X attempts to go after Ryker. Breaking free, Superman once again confronts N.R.G.-X, who self-destructs in the process. He reverts to his human form and is rendered comatose.
Nylor Truggs	The New Adventures of Superboy #50 (February 1984)	Superboy enemy; 30th century criminal, stole the Dial H for Hero dial from a museum and traveled back in time to ally with teen Lex Luthor; used dial-created super-identities Cyclone, Landslide, Smasher and High-Roller.
Nzykmulk	Superman #421 (July 1986)	Mr. Mxyzptlk's deranged cousin from the Fifth Dimension with magical powers surpassing even Mr. Mxyzptlk's own. Although to human eyes he looks identical to Mxyzptlk, according to Mxyzptlk nothing could be further from the truth. Escaping from the Fifth Dimension's mental institution equivalent of a madhouse (gooloogog), Nzykmulk's greater Fifth Dimensional powers stems from several more years of experience in comparison to his cousin, 42 joljos difference with his greater age. Appeared only once during the last of the Pre-Crisis era days to cause Superman and Mxyzptlk problems, while trapping them both within the Fifth Dimension itself.
Obsession	The Adventures of Superman #532 (February 1996)	A disturbed fan of Superman, Dana Dearden stole magical objects to gain powers to be Superman's partner and lover, beating Jimmy Olsen until he gave her his signal watch. Dubbing herself Superwoman, Olsen instead called her Obsession and she would eventually give her life to save Superman.
Orbitrons	Batman #312 (June 1979)	Floating globe-like aliens residing "somewhere in the outermost galaxy", used magnetic rays to plunder gold and abduct Earth scientists until dissuaded by Superman.
Othar	Superboy #101 (December 1962)	Superboy enemy; abducted Superboy and other superheroes to the planet Thrann.
Pee Wee Ragan	Superboy #110 (January 1964)	Superboy enemy; scrawny criminal, received duplicate Superboy powers from Professor Sardon.
Planeteer	Superman #387 (September 1983)	a.k.a. King Alexander. Alexander Mason was a child prodigy who became the world's leading magnetism expert at a very young age; however, he was also a megalomaniac who believed that he was the reincarnation of Alexander the Great and that it was his destiny to conquer the world. As the Planeteer, he used advanced magnetic field technology to abduct world leaders. When Superman rescued them, he destroyed the magnetic machines, unaware that by doing so, he was channeling their power directly into the Planeteer, who thus gained superhuman magnetic abilities. He later teamed up with Zazzala the Queen Bee.
Povra	The New Adventures of Superboy #20 (August 1981)	Superboy enemy; beautiful woman from planet Ulmara, abducted Superboy and brainwashed him to be a tourist attraction on Ulmara.
Predators	Superman vs. Predator, DC Comics/Dark Horse Comics crossover miniseries (May–July 2000)	A space hunter from the 1987 horror film Predator directed by John McTiernan. The Predators are depicted as large, sapient and sentient humanoid creatures who possess advanced technology, such as active camouflage and energy weapons, and are capable of interstellar travel.
Preus	Superman (vol. 2) #202 (April 2004)	Formerly a law enforcement officer from the bottle city of Kandor, he escaped the city and hunted Superman.
Professor Amos Weldon	Superboy #53 (December 1956)	Superboy enemy; criminal scientist, his time-ray inadvertently caused Superboy to change places in time with Superman.
Professor Sands	Action Comics #178 (March 1953)	a.k.a. the Sandman of Crime; proprietor of the Dreamorama, a theater which, via what today might be considered virtual reality technology, allowed demoralized criminals to live out their greatest criminal fantasies in "dream films".
Professor X	Superboy #69 (December 1958)	Superboy enemies; two criminals using a single identity as a mob boss.
Professor Zee	Superman #8 (January–February 1941)	An evil scientist who creates a formula that turns people into giants. He causes chaos around the country, kidnapping a powerful figure and threatening to turn his daughter into a giant. However, he is killed in an accident caused by the giants. He is not to be confused with the Professor Zee who created the time machine used by Per Degaton.
Psiphon and Dreadnought	Superman (vol. 2) #19 (July 1988)	Psiphon drained Superman's powers and gave them to the Dreadnought.
Pulsar	The New Adventures of Superboy #31 (July 1982)	Superboy enemy; Robert Altus Jr., empowered by obsessed scientist father to supplant Superboy.
Puzzler	Action Comics #49 (June 1942)	A criminal obsessed with games and puzzles, he fought Superman after he tried to start a protection racket.
Puzzler	Superman #187 (December 2002)	Valerie Van Haften is made up of living puzzle pieces, able to move and reconstruct herself at will.
Quarmer	Superman #233 (January 1971)	Originally a non-corporeal being from a realm called the Quarrm Dimension, it entered the main dimension where it built itself a body of sand and, over time, drained Superman's powers, transforming into a sand doppelganger of Superman.
Quex-Ul	Superman #157 (November 1962)	A Kryptonian criminal and inmate of the Phantom Zone. Usually a henchman of General Zod.
R24	Superman #71 (July–August 1951)	Leader of a uranium-smuggling ring.
Rainbow Raider	Superboy #84 (October 1960)	Superboy enemy; the Rainbow Raider identity was originally used by Jonathan Kent to impersonate a supervillain as part of an elaborate scheme for Superboy to capture gangster Vic Munster and his henchmen. Later, Munster himself used the Rainbow Raider identity, but was again defeated. Not to be confused with the later member of the Rogues, a supervillain group made up of various enemies of Flash.
Rainmaker	World's Best Comics #1 (spring 1941)	Used a rain-making machine to destroy dams and flood valleys as part of an extortion scheme, briefly weakened Superman with a "radical new paralysis gas".
Ralph Cowan	Action Comics #41 (October 1941)	A respectable figure who has been paid to cause sabotage around the nation. One of his agents, Steve Grant, places a bomb inside a plant. He is one of three employees who took the day off and is tracked down by Superman. Cowan tries to kill him to stop him from talking, but Superman foils the attempts. He hears of a wave of sabotage across the nation. Cowan, angry at the Daily Planet writing down stories of the sabotage, gets into the Planet, and when Lois meets him, he claims to be an electrician. She sees him planting a bomb, so he ties her up and gags her. He leaves, hoping she will be killed in the bomb blast. However, Superman rescues her in time and stops the bomb from destroying the Planet. He then captures Cowan.
Razkal	Superman #15 (March–April 1942)	The dictator of Oxnalia who is based on Adolf Hitler and attacks the democratic nation of Numark. Superman stops an assassination attempt on Numark's King Boris, then saves Numark's young Prince Michael after he is kidnapped and taken to the castle of the treacherous Lord Murgot, who is killed. Superman then stops an attacking army, as well as bringing about peace between the two nations. Razkal tries to escape, but is shot and killed by one of his own men.
Rebello	Superboy #72 (April 1959)	Superboy enemy; renegade Superboy robot, considered itself more "perfect" than Superboy and sought to supplant him.
Red Cloud	DC Nation #0 (July 2018)	Robinson Goode an enforcer for the "Invisible Mafia", a clandestine criminal organization based out of Metropolis. She also works as a reporter for the Daily Planet, although this is just to ensure the secretive nature of her organization is upheld. Robinson possesses the metahuman gene, providing her with the power to transform into red mist. The mist is toxic to other people, including Kryptonians.
Redemption	Action Comics #848 (May 2007)	Jarod Dale is able to draw power from his congregation's faith and prayer to become an immensely powerful superhuman. However, Pastor Matthews Hightower was the catalyst behind the power and subverted Redemption into killing soldiers in Africa.
Remnant	Superman: Day of Doom miniseries (2003)	A villain whose identity is still a mystery. He holds Superman responsible for the tragedies that resulted from his first battle with Doomsday. Even though he looks like a supernatural wraith, Superman deduced the villain is an ordinary human with such advanced illusionary technology that even Superman had difficulty discerning, despite his enhanced senses.
Ringmaster	Adventure Comics #120 (September 1947)	Superboy enemy; led a "Crime Circus" including Grillo, Musculo, Loop and Swoop.
Riot	Superman: The Man of Steel #61 (October 1996)	Scientist Frederick Von Frankenstein worked with machinery and discovered a way to duplicate himself at the cost of his ability to sleep. Driven mad by insomnia, he began a criminal career.
Rock	Superman: The Man of Tomorrow #8 (spring 1997)	An astronaut who, after an experiment, becomes a rock-like behemoth, blaming Lex Luthor for the development and clashing with Superman while trying to enact revenge.
Ron-Avon	Superboy #141 (September 1967)	Superboy enemy; superhuman youth from the planet Belgor, forced to fight Superboy in gladiatorial combat.
Savior	Action Comics #705 (December 1994)	Ramsey Murdoch believes that Superman is a fake and that the real Superman never recovered from his death at the hands of Doomsday. He has the ability to create or become anything he imagines.
Seal Gang	Action Comics #231 (August 1957)	Modern-day pirates whose use of a subterranean base on the supposedly deserted island Vumania was inadvertently exposed by Jimmy Olsen when he inherited the island.
Seeker	The Superman Family #191 (September–October 1978)	Superboy enemy; sentient Kryptonian spacecraft, sent prior to Krypton's destruction to locate a suitable planet for relocation, attempted to xenoform Earth to fit the specifications.
Shadowdragon	Superman (vol. 2) #97 (February 1995)	A quasi-techno-ninja, Savitar Bandu is the prince of Bhutan who worked briefly for Conduit before learning his true nature and turning on him.
Shockwave	Blue Devil #2 (July 1984)	A short, armored criminal.
Simyan and Mokkari	Superman's Pal Jimmy Olsen #135 (January 1971)	Products of the twisted genius of Dabney Donovan, they ran from him and became servants of Darkseid.
SKULL	Superman #301 (July 1976)	Criminal organization of geniuses and scientists formed by the original Atomic Skull that often comes into conflict with Kobra.
Skyhook	Superman (vol. 2) #15 (March 1988)	Aleister Hook is a Fagin-like corrupter of children who was turned into a winged demon by Blaze. His egg-like cocoons can mutate children into winged beings under his control.
Sleez	Action Comics #592 (September 1987)	An evil schemer from Apokolips with psychic abilities, able to feed on and manipulate the emotions of others.
Slug Kelly	Superman #5 (summer 1940)	A racketeer who places rigged slot machines in stores to tempt money from schoolchildren, threatening some store owners. When Lois and Clark confront him and refuse bribes, he holds Clark hostage and forces Lois to sign an allegation that her editor George Taylor is a partner in the racket, hoping to discredit any news story against him. Subsequently, Superman destroys his hideout, captures his secret ledgers, and systematically clears the slot machines from Metropolis. Slug kidnaps Lois, but Superman captures Slug and dangles him over a school building until he confesses the truth of his racket. This spurs hundreds of schoolchildren to rush to the police testifying against him, sealing his arrest and clearing Taylor.
Socrates	Adventure Comics #225 (June 1956)	Superboy enemy; mynah bird who acquired superpowers and criminal human-level intelligence from drinking kryptonite-tainted water.
Sodom and Gomorrah	Action Comics #819 (November 2004)	A husband-and-wife team who have the ability to fire blasts when touching each other's hand. The blast on impact turns whatever it hits into salt.
Solar Boy	Adventure Comics #269 (February 1960)	Superboy enemy; superpowered alien youth who captured and sadistically mistreated Krypto the Superdog, until Superboy rescued him.
Solomon Grundy	Superman #319 (January 1978)	When the original Earth-Two Solomon Grundy left some residual cells behind, they formed a more beastial version of the Earth-Two Solomon Grundy when Parasite used a special crystal on the cells.
Space-Boy	Adventure Comics #264 (September 1959)	Superboy enemy; Zall-Dix, alien youth who attempted to force Superboy to exchange bodies with him.
Srakka	Superman #398 (January 1984)	An alien dybbuk who can possess the bodies of others.
Stasis	The Superman Family #192 (November–December 1978)	Superboy enemy; able to halt biological functions in victims' bodies, led a gang in an attempted takeover of Smallville.
Subjekt-17	Superman #655 (October 2006)	An alien family crashes in Kazakhstan, the father dead and the pregnant mother taken by Russian scientists for testing. However, the alien female would die during this time and all that was left was the alien infant. Dubbed Subjekt-17, the infant would spend largely his entire life imprisoned. Upon his escape, unable to blend into human culture because of his appearance and angry at his treatment by the Russian scientists, he seeks revenge against the humans of Earth, the similarly alien Superman becoming the focus of his ire.
Strongarm Bandit	Action Comics #27 (August 1940)	A masked criminal with enormous strength who starts committing crimes around the city after a circus comes to town. Though strongman Herculo is suspected (and easily outdone by Superman in a strength contest), the bandit is in reality the circus' clown, an ex-strongman who is caught 'red-handed' after robbing money that Clark Kent had secretly marked with red powder.
Superwoman	Justice League of America #29 (August 1964)	A villainous version of Wonder Woman from a reversed version of Earth.
Susan "Suzie" Thompkins	Action Comics #59 (April 1943)	The niece of Lois Lane. Her preferred pastime seems to be making her Aunt Lois' life complicated with her overactive imagination. In The New 52 timeline, Captain Comet reveals her as a member of a race of post-humans known as Neo-Sapiens or Nutants.
Talon	Superman #17 (July–August 1942)	Albert Caldwell, the president of Metropolis Subway Inc. and Axis fifth columnist who attempted to sabotage Metropolis's transportation system.
Tara Cobol	Mystery in Space #114 (December 1980)	With assistant Fortran, used the S.T.A.R. Labs computer to seize control of weather satellites.
Terra-Man	Superman #249 (March 1972)	An interstellar outlaw; Tobias "Toby" Manning commits crimes to carry the legend of the Wild West outlaw across the stars. Terra-Man was noted for using futuristic weapons modeled after those used in the Old West as well as riding a winged horse-like alien named Nova.
Thaddeus Killgrave	Superman (vol. 2) #19 (July 1988)	Mad scientist and ally to Intergang.
Thing from 40,000 A.D.	Superman #87 (February 1954)	Shape-changing mass of "primeval matter" banished from the year A.D. 40,000, impersonated Superman and others during an attempt to return to its home era and conquer it.
Thought Explorers	Adventure Comics #456 (March–April 1978)	Superboy enemies; two alien researchers, used illusory attacks on Smallville to test Superboy.
Tolos	Superman (vol. 2) #107 (December 1995)	An alien wizard who added alien beings to the bottle city of Kandor with the ability to possess the bodies of its inhabitants.
Turlock the Berserker	The New Adventures of Superboy #49 (January 1984)	Superboy enemy; extradimensional barbarian warrior, wielded burning sword, rode in chariot drawn by two two-headed half-dog/half-rat creatures.
Tweeds	Action Comics #26 (July 1940)	Clark arrives for a date with Lois, who is making a donation to the Brentwood Rehabilitation Home. Clark tells her that the place is more interested in money than their young charges. Lois decides they should visit the home so that she can disprove Clark. After a pleasant visit, Lois and Clark are stopped by a charge, Davey Merrill, who cut his hands climbing the wall just to ask for something to eat. Once they feed him, he tells them all about the horrible conditions at the home. They return, but the barking of the guard dog Black Satan wakes up Mrs. Tweed. Superman saves them from the dog, but when Davey enters the Tweeds find him and seeing his cut hands, they realize he has been over the fence and lock him in a cupboard downstairs. Lois goes back to investigate and finds records which prove the Tweeds are not spending the money on the children, but she is seized by the Tweeds. They tie her up, gag her and leave her in a barred cell. Lois then hears a noise from Davey. She rubs her face against the iron bars of her cell and removes her gag, then talks to Davey. Assuming Lois has gotten into trouble, Superman rushes to the home to save her and Davey. He saves them both and the Tweeds are arrested.
Untouchables	DC Comics Presents #58 (June 1983)	Originally called the Intangibles, they are a trio of criminals who use technology that make themselves intangible and fought Superman, Robin and the Elongated Man. They would return, modelling themselves after John Dillinger, Bonnie Parker and Clyde Barrow, and battle the Hawk and the Dove.
Vakox	Superboy #104 (April 1963)	A Phantom Zone prisoner.
Varx	Superboy #192 (December 1972)	Superboy enemy; sole survivor of subterranean Atlantean civilization, attempted to screen Smallville from the sun, which he superstitiously feared.
Vyndktvx	Action Comics #1 (September 2011)	An impish supervillain who is an enemy of Superman and Mister Mxyzptlk.
Wraith	The New Adventures of Superboy #21 (September 1981)	Superboy enemy; a spectral menace from outer space.
Xadu / Xa-Du	Adventure Comics #283 (April 1961)	A Kryptonian researcher, interested in improving research into suspended animation. He conducted illegal experiments that led him to be banished to the Phantom Zone. In The New 52, Xa-Du is the first inmate of the Phantom Zone and swore revenge on the family of the Phantom Zone's discoverer, Jor-El. Over the course of his incarceration in the Phantom Zone, Xa-Du built an "ecto-suit" to allow him to walk freely outside of it and operated as the "Phantom King".
Xasnu	Action Comics #278 (July 1961)	Alien plant-being, planned Earth invasion, empowered and mind-controlled Perry White as "Masterman" to battle Superman.
Xenomorphs	Alien (1979)	A parasitic species that is the primary antagonist of the Alien film series. They have battled Superman in Superman/Aliens and Superman and Batman versus Aliens and Predator.
Xnorians	Adventure Comics #294 (March 1962)	Superboy enemies; teleported Smallville students to Xnor and Xnor students to Earth in involuntary "student exchange program," threatened to destroy Earth if Xnorian students were mistreated.
Zaora	The Adventures of Superman #444 (September 1988)	A Kryptonian criminal and inmate of the Phantom Zone, usually connected to General Zod. She may be a post-Crisis variant of Faora Hu-Ul (see above).
Zha-Vam	Action Comics #351 (June 1967)	Only appearing in Action Comics #351-353, created by the gods to defeat Superman with their powers, like Hercules' strength, and possessing a belt that gives him other powers, like transforming into a Gorgon.
Zozz	Superboy #81 (June 1960)	Superboy enemy; tyrant of planet Xenon, where most inhabitants have superhuman powers and those who do not are persecuted and exiled.

== Group villains ==
Group/team	First appearance	Description
Anti-Superman Army	Action Comics (vol. 2) #5 (2012)	As Superman grew more powerful and popular in his early years, Vynxktvx gathered up his enemies and collected them up into an army. One girl, Susie, was an exception to this, as she was tricked into joining the Army. Eventually, the army was defeated by Superman when he used everybody alive to stop Superdoom. Composed of Vyndktvx, Erik Drekken, Nimrod the Hunter, Susie Thompkins, Xa-Du, the Kryptonite Men (Kryptonite Man Green, Kryptonite Woman Red, and Kryptonite Man Blue), the Metaleks and Superdoom.
Black Zero (organization)	World of Krypton (January 2012)	A "clone liberation" movement and terrorist organisation from the planet Krypton that was ultimately responsible for the planet's destruction.
Intergang	Superman's Pal Jimmy Olsen #133 (October 1970)	An organized crime syndicate based primarily in Metropolis that uses technology provided by Darkseid.
Invisible Empire	Superboy #153 (January 1969)	Superboy enemies; alien invaders able to disassemble their atomic structure to enter and control any objects or people, sought to possess Earth's leaders.
Invisible Mafia	Superman #1001 (September 2018)	The major metahuman crime organization of Metropolis. It gets its distinct name from the fact that not even Superman himself could find it.
Phantom Zone criminals	Adventure Comics #283 (April 1961)	Pre-Crisis, these were Kryptonian criminals exiled to a border continuum called the "Phantom Zone", discovered by Superman's father, in which they only existed in a ghost-like form; this allowed them to survive the destruction of Krypton. Many of them would escape at various times and attack Superman, especially Jax-Ur, Faora, and Dru-Zod.
Superman Revenge Squad	Action Comics #286 (March 1962)	After Superboy foiled the plans of several blue-skinned criminals from the planet Wexr II, the Wexrans banded together as the Superboy Revenge Squad and plotted against him; the group's name changed when Superboy reached adulthood as Superman. Over the years, their membership expanded to include villains from several planets, all seeking vengeance against Superman for curtailing their criminal activities. Named members include leader Rava and Scout 627 (from Action Comics #287); Dixo and Vagu (Action Comics #295); Dorx and Krit (Action Comics #380); Dramx-One, Fwom, Jumrox, Klakok, and Nryana (Superman #366); Nakox (Superman #367); and Tydru (Superman #368).
Superman Revenge Squad	The Adventures of Superman #543 (February 1997)	A group of villains brought together by Morgan Edge with the intention of killing Superman. Their numbers in this Post-Crisis incarnation included Maxima, Barrage, Riot, Misa, the Anomaly, Baud, the Rock and the Parasite.

== Antiheroes and reformed, semi-reformed, or occasionally reformed supervillains ==
The following is a list of Superman enemies who have reformed and are more often depicted as allies than enemies.

Name	Alter ego	First appearance
Lobo	Unpronounceable	Omega Men #3 (June 1983)
Rampage	Karen Lou "Kitty" Faulkner	Superman (vol. 2) #7 (July 1987)
Maxima		Action Comics #645 (September 1989)

== Allies in conflict ==
Some characters originally conceived as heroes have come into conflict with Superman.

Enemy	First appearance	Description
Batman	Detective Comics #27 (May 1939)	As a child, Bruce Wayne watched his parents get murdered by mugger Joe Chill. Driven by this, he worked to make himself into the perfect crime fighter. He has fought Superman on occasion, most notably in the 1986 miniseries Batman: The Dark Knight Returns.
Vartox	Superman #281 (November 1974)	An alien superhero who sometimes fights Superman. His powers are equivalent to Superman's and he was once a boyfriend of Lana Lang.

== Enemies created for other media ==
These are Superman villains created in other media, with no appearances in previous comics.

Villain	Media	Actor/Actress	Description
Spider Lady	Superman (1948 serial)	Carol Forman	
Luke Benson	Superman and the Mole Men	Jeff Corey	
Blinky	Stamp Day for Superman	Billy Nelson	
Warlock	The New Adventures of Superman	Ray Owens	A male witch who appeared in six episodes of Filmation's The New Adventures of Superman animated TV series. His power is derived from a red jewel fitted to his cane that casts magical energy beams.
Otis	Superman; Superman II	Ned Beatty	Lex Luthor's bumbling henchman. Different versions of him later appear in the comics.
Non	Superman; Superman II	Jack O'Halloran	The mute henchman of General Zod. He has the same superpowers as Superman and Zod and sports a mustache and thicker beard than that of Zod. Non later crossed into the comics.
Ursa	Superman; Superman II	Sarah Douglas	The female companion of General Zod. She has the same superpowers as Superman and Zod and sports short hair. She has a fascination with authoritative-appearing badges and is driven by "perversions and unreasoning hatred of all mankind".
Ross Webster	Superman III	Robert Vaughn	An industrialist trying to gain a monopoly by destroying his rivals, who turns Superman evil with tainted kryptonite.
Nuclear Man	Superman IV: The Quest for Peace	Mark Pillow (actor); Gene Hackman (voice)	A solar-powered menace born by detonating a nuclear bomb attached with Superman's genetic material in the sun.
Lenny Luthor	Superman IV: The Quest for Peace	Jon Cryer	Lex Luthor's nephew.
Dollmaker	Super Friends; Batman vs. Robin	Frank Welker "Weird Al" Yankovic	Not to be confused with Barton Mathis, a Batman villain who also calls himself "the Dollmaker". The character was originally created for the animated series Super Friends: The Legendary Super Powers Show as a stand-in for the Toyman, but would later go on to appear in the comic books. The character, with elements of Barton Mathis, also appeared in the animated film Batman vs. Robin.
Nigel St. John	Lois & Clark: The New Adventures of Superman	Tony Jay	The butler and confidante of Lex Luthor, who later betrays him to Intergang and attempts to blackmail Superman with knowledge of his identity.
Tempus	Lois & Clark: The New Adventures of Superman	Lane Davies	Using the alias "John Doe", Tempus is time-traveler from the future who despises the peaceful society Superman created and wants to change time by killing or disposing of him beforehand.
Lionel Luthor	Smallville	John Glover	The father of Lex Luthor and a classic corrupt businessman.
Tina Greer	Smallville	Lizzy Caplan	A shapeshifter obsessed with Lana Lang.
Baern	Smallville	Bow Wow	A wraith that escaped from the Phantom Zone and could absorb and project nuclear energy. He possessed an Earth teenager.
Aldar	Smallville	Dave Bautista	A hulking man-eating humanoid.
Titan	Smallville	Kane	A bloodthirsty alien warrior looking for the ultimate opponent.
Margaret Thoreaux	Smallville	Kristin Kreuk	Lana Lang's ancestor and a witch.
Big Susan and Lizzie	Superman: The Animated Series	Valri Bromfield (Big Susan); Laurie Fraser (Lizzie)	Small-time robbers.
Kurt Bowman	Superman: The Animated Series	Eddie Barth	A corrupt detective. He ironically realized that Clark Kent is Superman moments before his execution by gas chamber.
Earl Garver	Superman: The Animated Series	Brian Cox	A mad scientist who held Metropolis for ransom with a lead-covered bomb.
Livewire	Superman: The Animated Series	Lori Petty	A Superman-criticizing shock jock named Leslie Willis who received the power to manipulate and turn into electricity from a bolt of lightning.
Livewire	Justice League	Maria Canals-Barrera	
Luminus	Superman: The Animated Series	Robert Hays	Edward Lytener is a former LexCorp scientist armed with light-based weaponry and hard-light constructs.
Mercy Graves	Superman: The Animated Series	Lisa Edelstein	Lex Luthor's faithful henchwoman, an experienced hand-to-hand combatant. Graves was later incorporated into the comics continuity, where she is depicted as an Amazon.
Mercy Graves	Justice League	Lisa Edelstein	Lex Luthor's faithful henchwoman, an experienced hand-to-hand combatant. Graves was later incorporated into the comics continuity, where she is depicted as an Amazon.
Mercy Graves	The Batman	Gwendoline Yeo	Lex Luthor's faithful henchwoman, an experienced hand-to-hand combatant. Graves was later incorporated into the comics continuity, where she is depicted as an Amazon.
Prometheon Creature	Superman: The Animated Series	Frank Welker	A large humanoid alien with minimal intelligence that was created for simple labor and absorbs heat to fuel itself.
Corey Mills	Superman: The Animated Series	Xander Berkeley	An outstanding officer who was selected to don a battle suit controlled by his neural systems, but is driven insane by its effects.
Unity	Superman: The Animated Series	Stephen Root	A slimy alien that converts humans into mindless drones.
Volcana	Superman: The Animated Series	Peri Gilpin	Claire Selton, a pyrokinetic imprisoned by the government as a secret weapon. She is rescued by Superman, but later returns to being a villain. Volcana was later incorporated into the comics continuity, where she is depicted as a member of the Masters of Disaster.
Volcana	Justice League	Peri Gilpin	Claire Selton, a pyrokinetic imprisoned by the government as a secret weapon. She is rescued by Superman, but later returns to being a villain. Volcana was later incorporated into the comics continuity, where she is depicted as a member of the Masters of Disaster.
John Henry Irons / “Captain Luthor” / The Stranger	Superman & Lois	Wole Parks	A survivor from an alternate Earth which was destroyed and somehow crash landed on Earth-Prime where he vows revenge against Superman for supposedly killing those he loved.

== Villains from comics in other media ==
A number of villains from the comic books have made an appearance, or appearances, in Superman related live-action media.

Villain	Media	Actor/Actress
Amanda Waller	Smallville	Pam Grier
Amos Fortune	Smallville	James Kidnie
Bizarro	Superboy	Barry Meyers
Bizarro	Superman & Lois	Tyler Hoechlin
Bizarro	Smallville	Tom Welling; Quinn Lord
Brainiac	Smallville	James Marsters; Allison Mack
Bruno Mannheim	Smallville	Dominic Zamprogna
Bruno Mannheim	Superman & Lois	Chad L. Coleman
Darkseid	Smallville	John Glover; Michael Daingerfield
Deadshot	Smallville	Bradley Stryker
Deathstroke	Lois & Clark: The New Adventures of Superman	Antonio Sabàto Jr.
Deathstroke	Smallville	Michael Hogan
DeSaad	Smallville	Steve Byers
Doomsday	Batman v Superman: Dawn of Justice	Robin Atkin Downes
Doomsday	Smallville	Sam Witwer; Dario Delacio
Faora	Man of Steel	Antje Traue
Faora	Smallville	Erica Durance; Sharon Taylor
General Zod	Superman; Superman II	Terence Stamp
General Zod	Man of Steel	Michael Shannon
General Zod	Superman & Lois	Tyler Hoechlin
General Zod	Smallville	Michael Rosenbaum; Callum Blue; Terence Stamp
Glorious Godfrey	Smallville	Michael Daingerfield
Granny Goodness	Smallville	Nancy Bell; Christine Willes
Icicle (Joar Mahkent)	Smallville	Gardiner Millar
Icicle (Cameron Mahkent)	Smallville	Wesley MacInnes
Jax-Ur	Man of Steel	Mackenzie Gray
Lashina	Smallville	Rochelle Okoye
Lex Luthor	Atom Man vs. Superman	Lyle Talbot
Lex Luthor	Superman; Superman II; Superman IV: The Quest for Peace	Gene Hackman
Lex Luthor	Superman Returns	Kevin Spacey
Lex Luthor	Batman v Superman: Dawn of Justice	Jesse Eisenberg
Lex Luthor	Superboy	Scott James Wells; Sherman Howard
Lex Luthor	Lois & Clark: The New Adventures of Superman	John Shea
Lex Luthor	Superman & Lois	Michael Cudlitz
Lex Luthor	Smallville	Michael Rosenbaum
Livewire	Smallville	Anna Mae Routledge
Livewire	Supergirl	Brit Morgan
Mad Harriet	Smallville	Lindsay Hartley
Maxima	Smallville	Charlotte Sullivan
Maxima	Supergirl	Eve Torres
Maxwell Lord	Smallville	Gil Bellows
Maxwell Lord	Supergirl	Peter Facinelli
Mercy Graves	Batman v Superman: Dawn of Justice	Tao Okamoto
Mercy Graves	Supergirl	Rhona Mitra
Metallo	Superboy	Michael Callan
Metallo	Lois & Clark: The New Adventures of Superman	Scott Valentine
Metallo	Smallville	Brian Austin Green
Metallo	Supergirl	Frederick Schmidt
Mister Mxyzptlk	Superboy	Michael J. Pollard
Mister Mxyzptlk	Lois & Clark: The New Adventures of Superman	Howie Mandel
Mister Mxyzptlk	Smallville	Trent Ford
Mister Mxyzptlk	Supergirl	Peter Gadiot, later Thomas Lennon
Morgan Edge	Smallville	Rutger Hauer; Patrick Bergin
Morgan Edge	Supergirl	Adrian Pasdar
Nam-Ek	Smallville	Leonard Roberts
Non	Superman Superman II	Jack O'Halloran
Non	Supergirl	Chris Vance
Neutron	Smallville	Jae Lee
Parasite	Smallville	Brendan Fletcher
Parasite	Supergirl	William Mapother
Persuader	Smallville	Fraser Aitcheson
Plastique	Smallville	Jessica Parker Kennedy
Prankster	Lois & Clark: The New Adventures of Superman	Bronson Pinchot
Roulette	Smallville	Steph Song
Roulette	Supergirl	Dichen Lachman
Silver Banshee	Smallville	Odessa Rae; Allison Mack; Erica Durance
Silver Banshee	Supergirl	Italia Ricci
Solomon Grundy	Smallville	John DeSantis
Toyman	Lois & Clark: The New Adventures of Superman	Sherman Hemsley
Toyman	Smallville	Chris Gauthier
Toyman	Supergirl	Henry Czerny
Ultraman	Smallville	Tom Welling
Curtis Knox	Smallville	Dean Cain
Nick O'Teen	Health Education Council	

== See also ==
- List of Aquaman enemies
- List of Batman family enemies
- List of Flash enemies
- Rogues
- List of Green Lantern enemies
- List of Wonder Woman enemies
