= Nicotine (disambiguation) =

Nicotine is a chemical compound.

Nicotine may also refer to:

- Nicotine (novel), a 2016 novel by Nell Zink
- Nicotine (band), an Indian heavy metal band
- Nicotine (album), a 2020 album by Trevor Daniel, or the title song
- "Nicotine" (song), a 2013 song by Panic! at the Disco from Too Weird to Live, Too Rare to Die!
- Nicotine, a client of the file-sharing software Soulseek
- "Nicotine", a 2003 song by Anet from Talented Girl

== See also ==
- Nicotinic acid, or niacin
- Nicotine gum
- Nicotine patch
- Nicotine poisoning
- Nick O'Teen
