= Shu Hai Practices Javelin =

Studio album by Chaya Czernowin
- Released: 2002
- Genre: Contemporary classical music
- Length: 72:43
- Label: Mode Records
- Producer: Chaya Czernowin

Chaya Czernowin chronology
Afatsim (1999)	Shu Hai Practices Javelin (2002)	Maim (2010)

Shu Hai Practices Javelin is the second CD of music by Israeli composer Chaya Czernowin released by Mode Records, with music settings of poems by Zohar Eitan whose 1997 poetry collection it borrows. It features prominently German singer and improviser Ute Wassermann, and the vocal writing has been described as reminiscent of that of John Cage, Cathy Berberian and Luciano Berio.

== Track listing ==
1. "Six Miniatures And A Simultaneous Song" – 11:30
2. "Shu Hai In An Orchestral Setting: First Orchestral Entrance" – 4:57
3. "Shu Hai In An Orchestral Setting: First Vocal Entrance" – 5:59
4. "Shu Hai In An Orchestral Setting: Second Orchestral Entrance" – 4:41
5. "Shu Hai In An Orchestral Setting: Second Vocal Entrance" – 13:59
6. "Shu Hai Mitamen Behatalat Kidon: First Movement" - 13:12
7. "Shu Hai Mitamen Behatalat Kidon: Second Movement" - 18:25
