= Afatsim =

Studio album by Chaya Czernowin
- Released: 1999
- Genre: Contemporary classical music
- Length: 68:07
- Label: Mode Records
- Producer: Chaya Czernowin

Chaya Czernowin chronology
Afatsim (1999)	Shu Hai Practices Javelin (2002)

Afatsim is the first portrait CD of music by Israeli composer Chaya Czernowin, released in 1999. It was reviewed in the Paris Transatlantic Review as “gritty stuff,” featuring “grainy string writing” and “imaginative use of non-European instruments”.

== Track listing ==
1. “Afatsim” – 9:36
2. “String Quartet” – 12:30
3. “Die Kreuzung” – 10:24
4. “Dam Sheon Hachol” – 24:24
5. “Ina” – 11:13
