= Kiryat Yam =

Kiryat Yam קִרְיַת יָם
- City

Hebrew transcription(s)
  - ISO 259: Qiryat Yamm
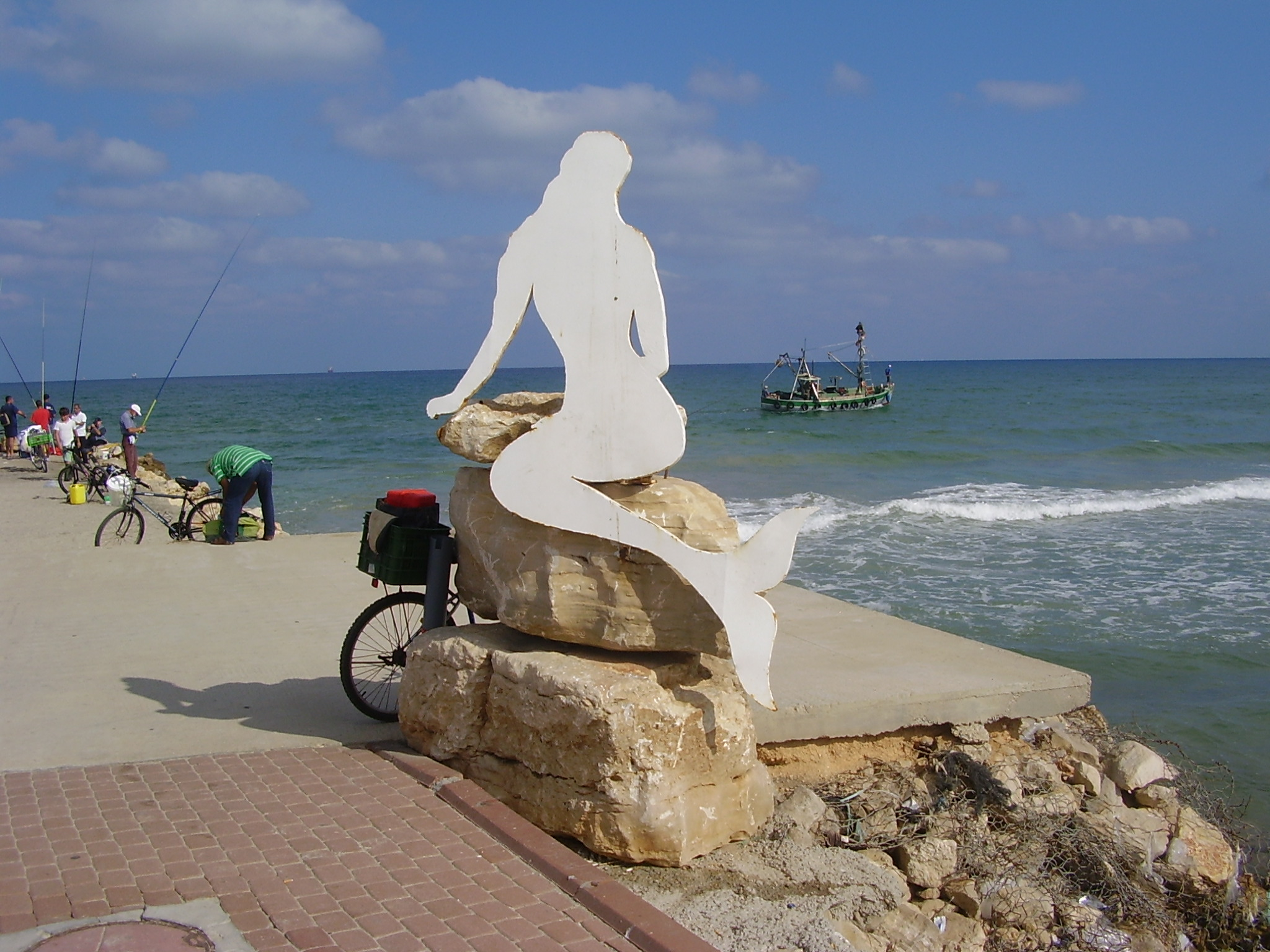
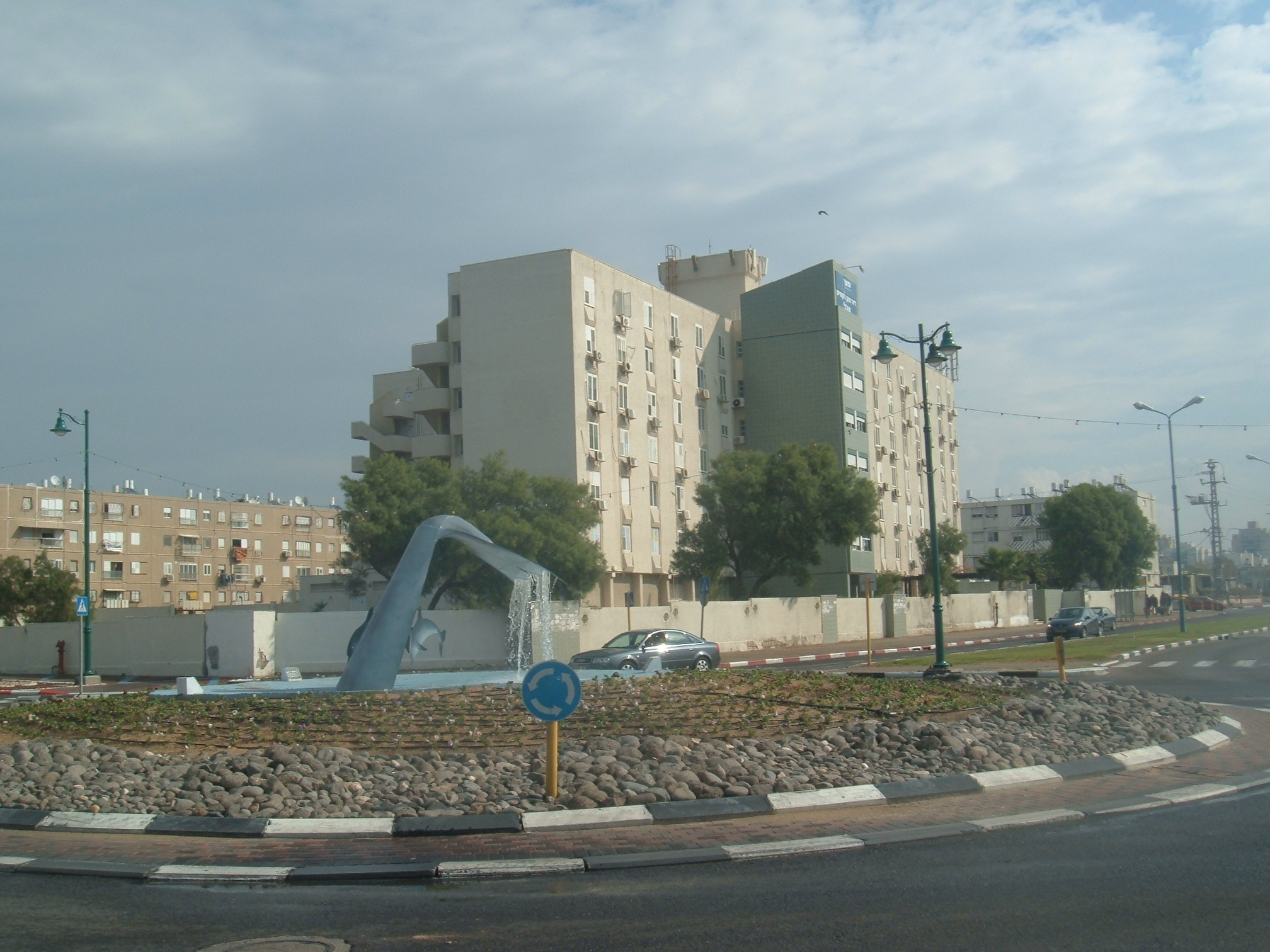
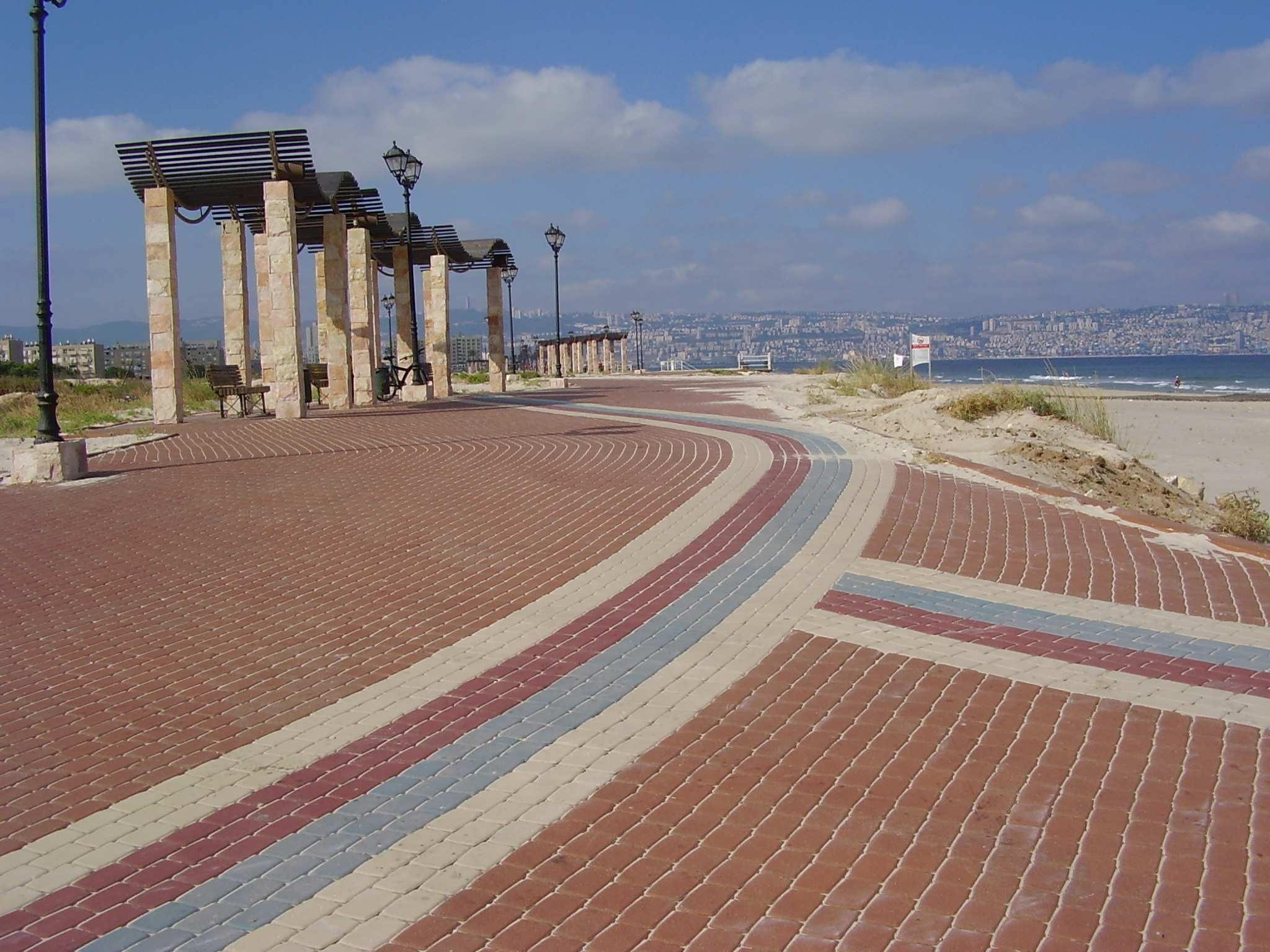
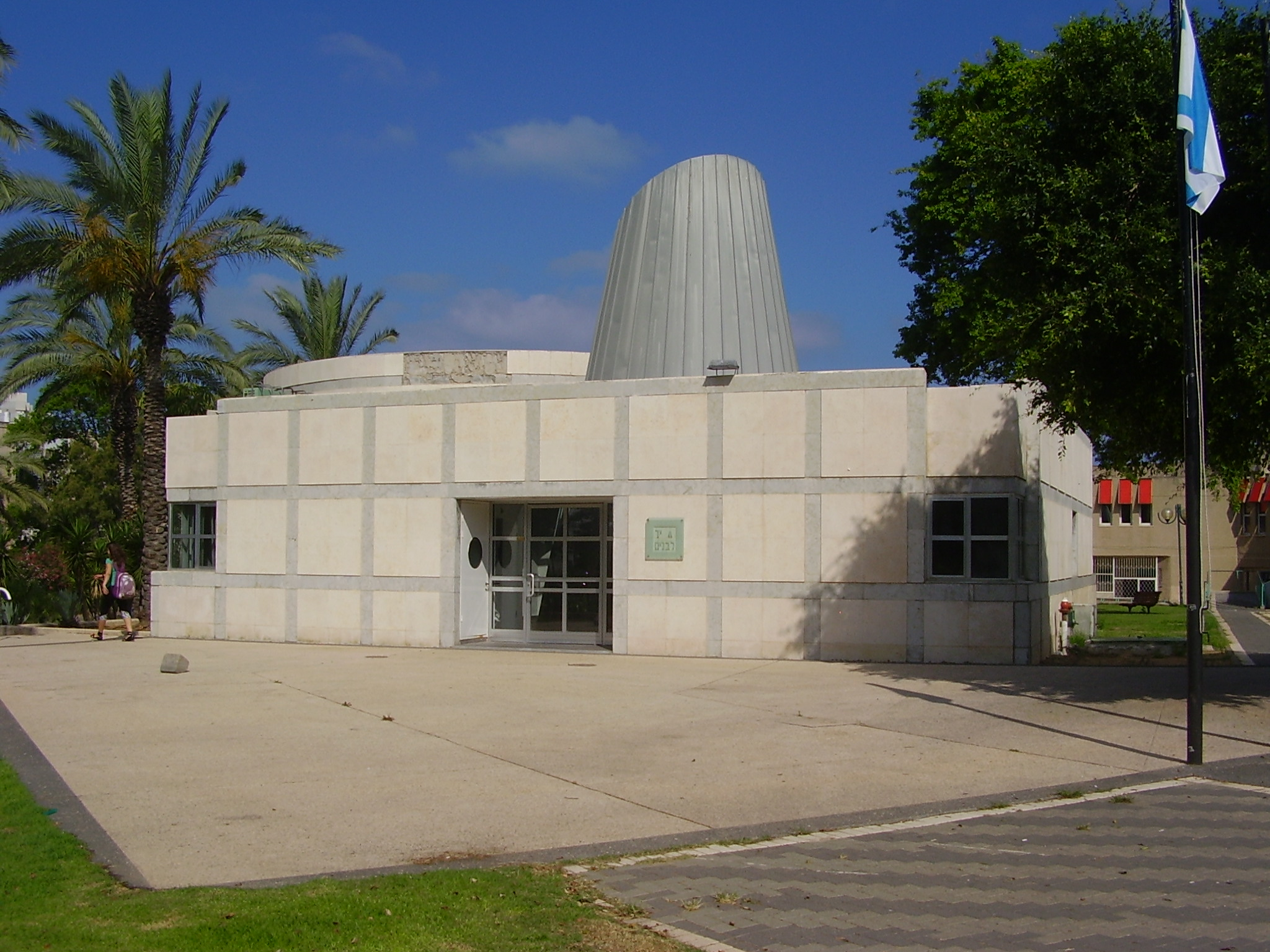
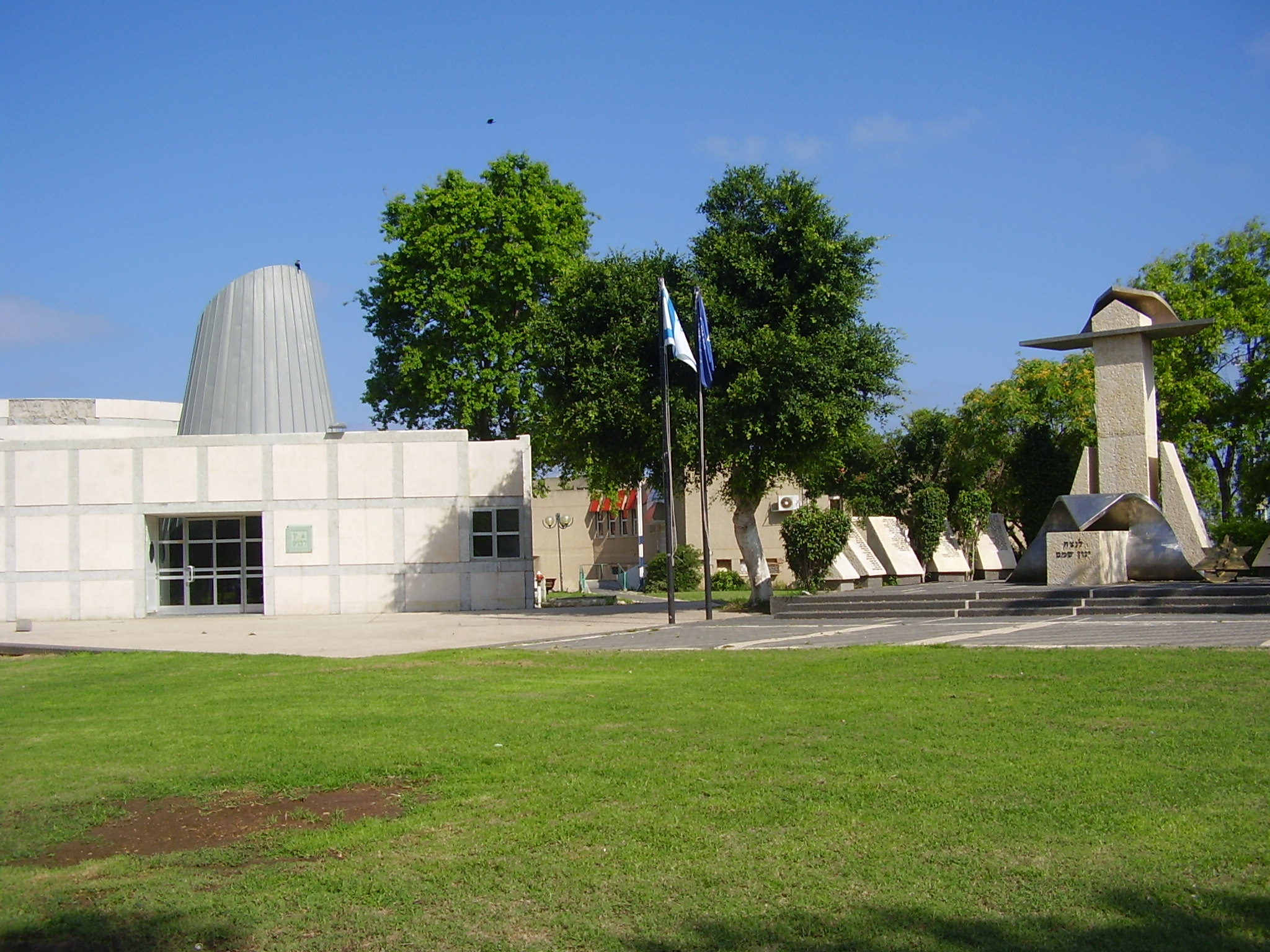

- Kiryat Yam emblem

- Location within Haifa region of Israel Location within Israel
- Coordinates: 32°50′0″N 35°04′0″E
- Country: Israel
- District: Haifa
- Subdistrict: Haifa
- Founded: 1945

Government
  - Mayor: David Even-Tzur

Area
  - Total: 4,339 dunams (4.339 km^{2}; 1.675 sq mi)

Population (2024)
  - Total: 41,957
  - Density: 9,670/km^{2} (25,040/sq mi)

Ethnicity
  - Jews and others: 99.8%
  - Arabs: 0.2%
- Name meaning: Sea Town
- Website: www.kiryat-yam.muni.il

Kiryat Yam (Hebrew: קִרְיַת יָם, lit. Sea Town, Arabic: كريات يام) is a city in the Haifa Bay district of Israel, 12 km (7 mi) north of Haifa. One of a group of Haifa suburbs known as the Krayot, it is located on the Mediterranean coast, between Kiryat Haim and the Tzur Shalom industrial area, west of Kiryat Motzkin. In 2024 it had a population of 41,957.

== History ==
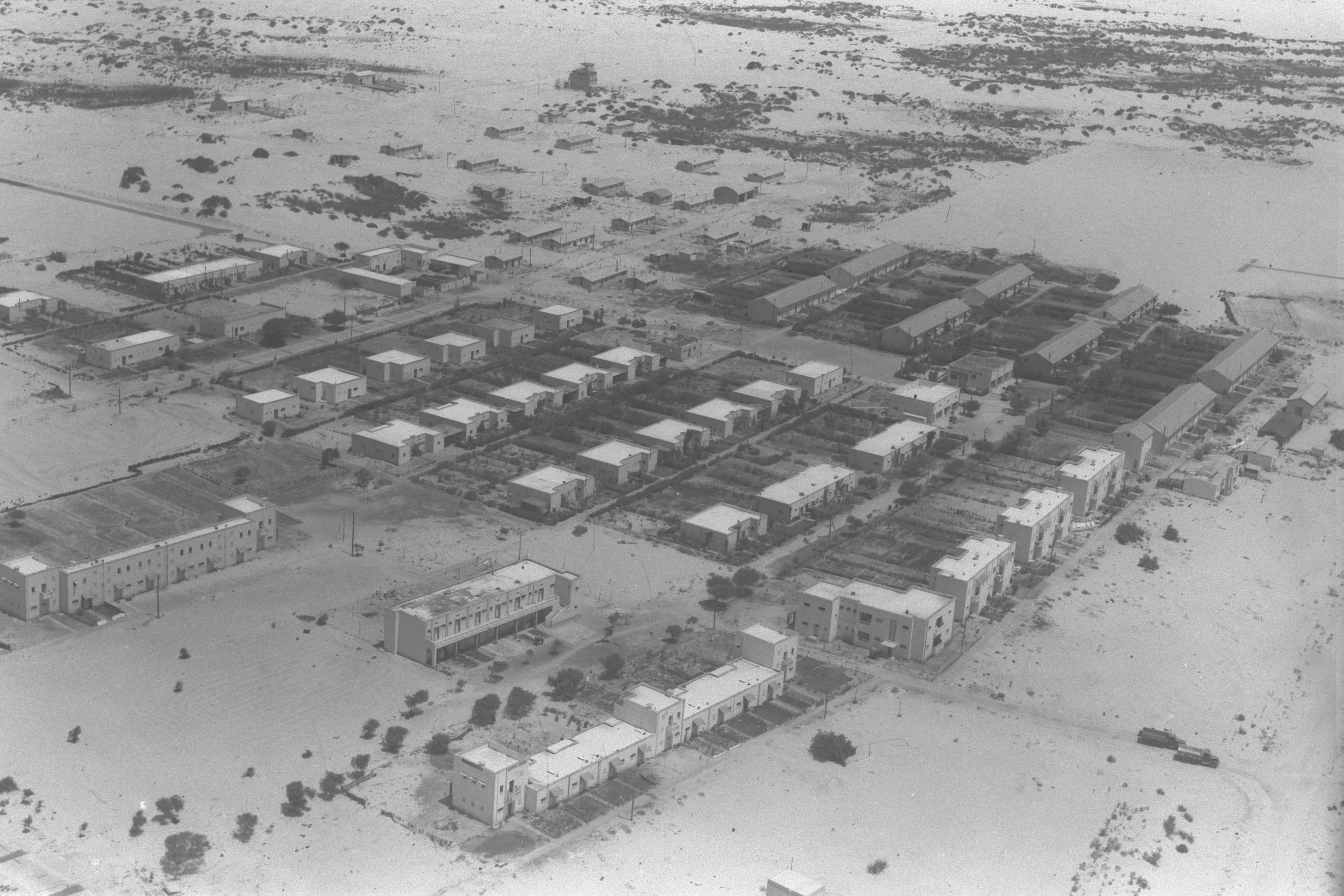
Kiryat Yam, 1949

The area was acquired by the Jewish community as part of the Sursock Purchase, in which a large tract of land on the Haifa Bay was purchased from the Sursock family of Beirut by the American Zion Commonwealth in 1925. In 1928, the Bayside Land Corporation, a joint venture of the Palestine Economic Corporation and the Jewish National Fund, acquired 2,400 dunams of residential land in a deal related to the building of the IPC oil pipeline. Development of a residential area began in 1939, and the first houses were completed in 1940.

== Demographics ==
Historical population
Year	Pop.	±%
1972	20,100	—
1983	29,300	+45.8%
1995	39,000	+33.1%
2008	37,700	−3.3%
2022	38,906	+3.2%
2024	41,959	+7.8%

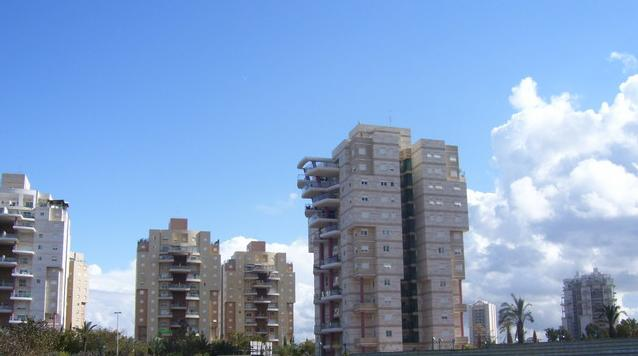
Psagot Yam neighborhood

Kiryat Yam has a population of 38,945. The northern area of the city is home to many immigrants from the former Soviet Union, North Africa and Ethiopia in which the municipality and its mayor Shmuel Sisso worked to build dozens of centers and homes to help the immigrants settle. The city is ranked medium on the socio-economic scale.

== Schools ==
Kiryat Yam has 15 preschools, eight elementary schools and 3 high schools (Rabin, Rodman & Levinson) with a student population of 10,000. In 2015 Rodman High School was merged with Rabin high school. The merging caused overcrowding at Rabin High School, resulting in overload and malfunction of public facilities and adjustment struggles of adolescents. Most of elementary schools and junior highs are included in public transport routes. Rabin high school was detached in circa 2015 from a particular bus line. The line has not been returned in spite of requests sent to the local municipality about the overcrowding and malfunction of public facilities.

== Israeli-Arab conflict ==
During the 2006 Lebanon War, Kiryat Yam was hit by Hezbollah rockets and suffered casualties and property damage.

== Urban development ==
Urban development plans aimed at upgrading the old Gimmel neighborhood were blocked by Rafael Advanced Defense Systems, whose main weapons development plant borders Kiryat Yam. In 2009, the Haifa district planning committee approved high-rise construction for the neighborhood, overruling Rafael's objections.

== Neighbourhoods ==
- Kiryat Yam (Dalet) – including Almogim
- Kiryat Yam (Gimmel) – built in the 1950s
- Kiryat Yam (Bet)
- Kiryat Yam (Alef)
- Savyoney Yam
- Psagot Yam & Bne Beitkha

== Voting patterns ==
In the 2022 election, 56 percent of voters in Kiryat Yam voted for the parties of the right-wing coalition led by Benjamin Netanyahu, while 42 percent voted for the parties of the center-left coalition led by Yair Lapid and 0.1 percent voted for the Arab parties.

In the 2026 election, 52 percent of voters in Kiryat Yam voted for the parties of the right-wing coalition led by Benjamin Netanyahu, while 42 percent voted for the parties of the center-left coalition led by Gadi Eisenkot and 0.1 percent voted for the Arab parties. An additional 3.7 percent voted for the Reservists, and 1.4 percent voted for Amcha Yisrael. Voter turnout increased 21 percent from the 2022 election.

== Notable people ==
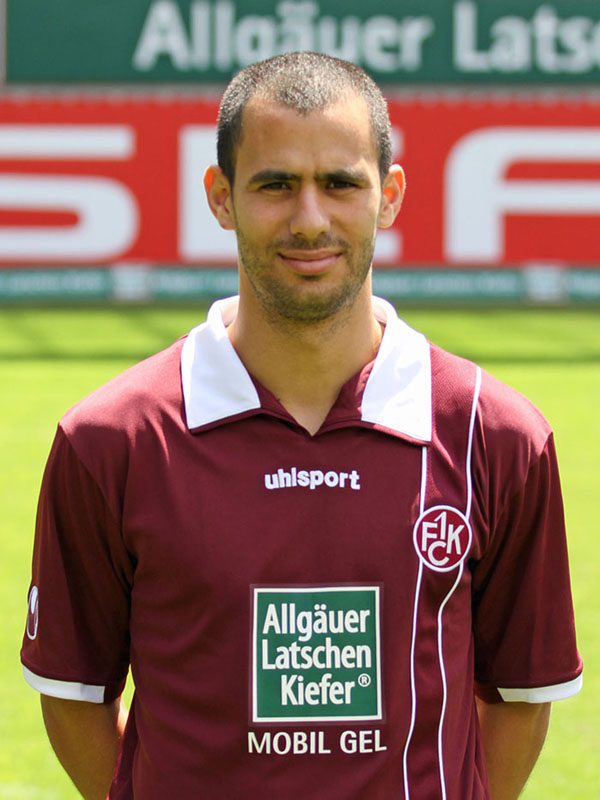
Gil Vermouth

- Avner Shats (born 1959), author and poet
- Sam Vaknin (born 1961), writer
- Erez Eisen (born 1980), musician
- Orel Grinfeld (born 1981), football referee
- Gil Vermouth (born 1985), footballer

== Twin towns – sister cities ==
Kiryat Yam is twinned with:

- Créteil, île-de-France (France)
- Friedrichshain-Kreuzberg, Berlin (Germany)
- Makó (Hungary)
- (Georgia (country)) Poti (Georgia)
- Sighetu Marmației (Romania)
