= Nell Zink =

US writer and media scholar

Helen "Nell" Louise Zink
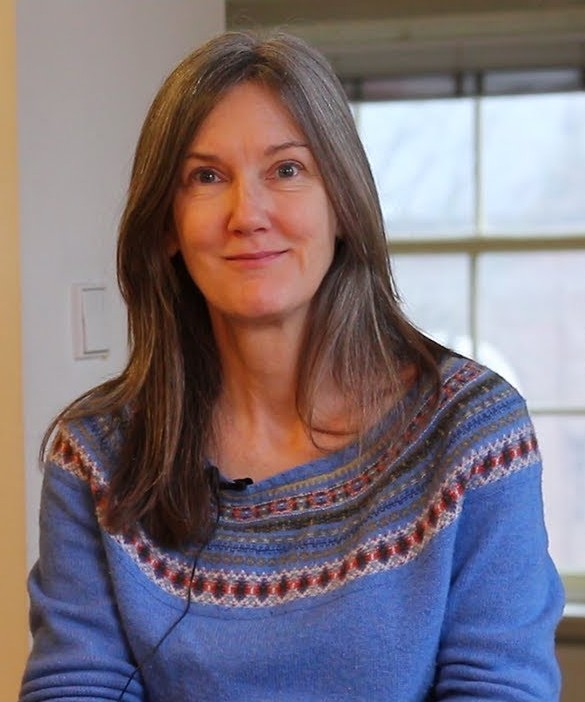
- Born: 1964 (age 61–62); California, U.S.
- Education: College of William and Mary; University of Tübingen
- Occupation: Novelist
- Writing career
- Language: English

Helen "Nell" Louise Zink (born 1964) is an American writer living in Germany. After being a long term penpal of Avner Shats, she came to prominence in her fifties with the help of Jonathan Franzen and her novel, Mislaid, was longlisted for the National Book Award. Her debut The Wallcreeper was released in the United States by the independent press Dorothy and named one of 100 notable books of 2014 by The New York Times, as was Mislaid. Zink then released Nicotine, Private Novelist, and Doxology through Ecco Press. In 2022 she published Avalon, also a New York Times notable book, with Alfred A. Knopf. In 2025 she received a Guggenheim Fellowship.

== Writing career ==
After fifteen years spent writing fiction exclusively for a single penpal, the Israeli postmodernist Avner Shats, Zink caught the attention of Jonathan Franzen with a letter promoting the work of the German ornithologist Martin Schneider-Jacoby and asking for his help to save birds in the Balkans. The two writers began a correspondence, and Franzen was surprised to learn that Zink had no published literary work. Zink comments:

I was so tired of Franzen saying that I should take myself seriously as a writer and I wanted to make very clear that there's a very clear distinction between taking your career seriously and taking your writing seriously. So I wrote the first part of a new novel, called The Wallcreeper, in just four days to show him that I knew what I was doing as a writer.

In early 2012, Zink sent Franzen her collected manuscripts. Franzen tried unsuccessfully to interest publishers in her 1998 novel Sailing Towards the Sunset by Avner Shats [sic]. Franzen's agent finally negotiated a six-figure publishing deal for Zink's Mislaid. Meanwhile, The Wallcreeper was published independently in the United States in 2014 by Dorothy, a publishing project. Reviewing it in The New York Times Robin Romm wrote, "Zink's work may be, at times, cerebral and a little distancing, but its vitality and purpose are invigorating" and "The passages about European environmental groups, government programs and methods of protest are less universal and more like amusement for insiders—more like the impromptu they started as, in other words." Overall she compliments the book on its humor, liveliness, and critique of humanity's "mindless consumption". Kirkus Reviews called it "a brief yet masterful novel of epic breadth." It was listed as one of the 100 notable books of 2014 by The New York Times.

Zink's second novel, Mislaid (Ecco Press), her first under a major publisher, follows the story of a white lesbian, Peggy, later 'Meg', born in rural Virginia in the 1960s. Peggy leaves her marriage to her professor, and with the help of a stolen birth certificate, creates a new African-American identity for herself and her daughter, Mireille/Karen. Though Dwight Garner called the book "a minor and misshapen novel from a potentially major voice," he later named it among his top ten books for the year. Walter Kirn, in The New York Times Book Review, found it a "provocative masquerade with heart," identifying an "elegance and confidence that are exceptionally rare now." New York Times Magazine writer Daniel J. Sharfstein observed that while Zink's plot may be "over-the-top," the real-life case of former NAACP chapter president Rachel Dolezal bears a remarkable parallel. Mislaid was longlisted for the National Book Award.

Nicotine was published in 2016. Joe Dunthorne wrote, "there is a recklessness and a freshness to this complex tale that is at its best when its elements of horror and humor collide." In the New York Times, Garner praised the book, writing, "I could listen to Ms Zink's dialogue all day; she may be, at heart, a playwright."

In Kirn's review of Mislaid, he writes that toward the end of the novel, "Piquancy and intimacy are lost, sacrificed to momentum and high mayhem. The damage isn't fatal, though; the novel's charm and intelligence ran deep." Overall, he compliments the book's pace and "sharp observations" made by her narration.

== Personal life ==
Zink was born in California in 1964 and raised in rural Virginia, a setting she draws on in Mislaid. She attended Stuart Hall School and the College of William and Mary, where she earned a B.A. in philosophy.

In 1993, while living in Hoboken, New Jersey, Zink founded a zine called Animal Review, which ran until 1997 and "featured submissions and interviews with punk musicians about their pets, from King Crimson guitarist Robert Fripp writing about his rabbit Beaton Bunnerius Bun, to Jon Langford, of British punk band The Mekons, discussing his loach fish." Zink has worked as a secretary at Colgate-Palmolive and as a technical writer in Tel Aviv. She has worked in construction, waited tables, and as a secretary before working as a translator. "There's never a market for true art," Zink told an interviewer from The Paris Review, "so my main concern was always to have a job that didn't require me to write or think."

Zink moved to Germany in 2000, eventually earning a PhD in Media Studies from the University of Tübingen. She has worked as a translator for Zeitenspiegel agency. She lives in Bad Belzig.

Zink has been married and divorced twice. On May 8, 1990, she eloped with Benjamin A. Burck in a "very simple civil ceremony" at the Henrico County Courthouse in Richmond, Virginia; they divorced in 1996. That year she married the Israeli composer and poet Zohar Eitan.

== Bibliography ==
=== Novels ===
- The Wallcreeper (200 pages, Dorothy, a publishing project, 2014, ISBN 0989760715)
- Mislaid (256 pages, Ecco Press, 2015, ISBN 0062364774)
- Nicotine (304 pages, Ecco Press, 2016, ISBN 0062441701)
- Private Novelist (336 pages, Ecco Press, 2016, ISBN 0062458302)
- Doxology (416 pages, Ecco Press, 2019, ISBN 006287778X)
- Avalon (224 pages, Alfred A. Knopf, 2022, ISBN 0593534891)
- Sister Europe (195 pages, Alfred A. Knopf, 2025, ISBN 9780593534915)

=== Short fiction ===
- Zink, Nell (2017). "Bonebreaker". Harper's, June 2017.
- Zink, Nell (2019). "Marmalade Sky". Harper's, July 2019.

=== Essays ===
- Zink, Nell (2019). "The Bird Angle". Harper's, November 2019.
- Zink, Nell (2020). "This Babushka Has Talons". n+1, January 2020.

=== Liner notes ===
- Two Originals of Tom Liwa, 2002

=== Critical studies and reviews ===
- Schulz, Kathryn (May 18, 2015). "Outside in : Nell Zink turned her back on the publishing world. It found her anyway". Life and Letters. The New Yorker. Vol. 91, no. 13. pp. 38–45.
- Haas, Lidija (October 2016). "Are You Kidding : The inscrutable sincerity of Nell Zink". Harper's.
- Tayler, Christopher (2 March 2017). "Agent bait". London Review of Books. 39 (5).
- Schwartz, Madeleine (September 2019). "Nell Zink's Satire Raises the Stakes". The New Yorker. September 2, 2019 Issue.
