= Avner Shats =

Israeli author and poet (born 1959)

Avner Shats (Hebrew: אבנר שץ; born 1959) is an Israeli author and poet. Born in Kiryat Yam, Israel, he now lives in Haifa.

Having attended the naval academy in Acre as a boy, Shats commanded a swift boat on the Dead Sea before going to work for a shipping company. He is held to be an expert on maritime lore in general and the brief, checkered history of seafaring Israel in particular.

He is regarded as Israel's token postmodernist, having first come to public attention in 1989 with an anonymous short story "Figs" that had the judges of the first Haaretz short story competition convinced that its author was a young Palestinian woman. A collection of stories "Ma'agalim Mudpasim" (Printed Circuits) followed. The novel "Lashut el Ha-Shkiʹah" (Sailing to the Sunset) received the 1997 Schweipert Prize, bestowed by the Hebrew University. That novel's main character, Elad Manor, was accepted to the prestigious Mishkenot Sha'ananim Poetry Workshop, also in Jerusalem. In 2000 Shats was a fellow of the Oxford Center for Hebrew and Jewish Studies, associated with Oxford University, where he began his second, still unfinished novel, "42." The children's story "Hila ve Dag Ha-Gerev" (Hila and the Sockfish) appeared in 2005.

A collection of short stories by Shats was published in November 2016 by Locus Publishing .

"Private Novelist" by Nell Zink contains two novellas titled "Sailing Towards the Sunset by Avner Shats" and "European Story for Avner Shats".
