= Doxology (novel) =

2019 novel by Nell Zink

- First edition cover
- Author: Nell Zink
- Audio read by: Eileen Stevens
- Cover artist: Élisabeth Vigée Le Brun; Allison Saltzman (design)
- Language: English
- Publisher: Ecco Press
- Publication date: 27 August 2019
- Publication place: United States
- Media type: Print (Hardcover and Paperback) and e-book
- Pages: 416
- ISBN: 978-0-06-287778-9
- Dewey Decimal: 813/.6
- LC Class: PS3626.I55 D69 2019

Doxology is a 2019 novel written by American author and novelist Nell Zink. The novel is set in New York City and concerns three musicians, and the impact that 9/11 has on their lives. In a 2019 interview, Zink described Doxology as being "set in a specific Senior Executive Service milieu in Northwest [Washington, DC]. New York in the book starts and ends as an unrealizable vision—the gleaming towers resting on grimy cubbyholes—plus the characters almost never leave the East Side. The tug-of-war is between two ideas of the good life."

== Plot ==
In the 1980s three artists meet in New York City. Pam, a coder, has escaped her confining and abusive family. Joe, an undiagnosed high-functioning Williams syndrome case. Daniel, a part time proofreader dreams of becoming a music distributor. Pam learns she is pregnant by Daniel and despite being ambivalent towards motherhood she decides to keep the baby and ends up marrying Daniel. Daniel manages to produce one single for Joe. Against all odds they manage to leverage the single into a successful record contract and Joe goes on to become a rock star, though he continues to babysit Pam and Daniel's daughter Flora.

On September 11, 2001, the three friends separately witness the terrorist attack on the twin towers. Daniel returns home and manages to escape the city to Washington, D.C., with Pam and Flora where they settle in with her parents. Joe and his girlfriend Gwen decide to shoot heroin which results in an overdose and death for Joe. Gwen flees the city and eventually calls Daniel to tell him that Joe is dead and though Daniel holds her responsible for Joe's death she is never charged.

As a result of the terrorist attacks Pam allows Flora to grow up in Washington, D.C., and be raised by her parents even as Daniel and Pam return to work.
