= Zohar Eitan =

Israeli poet and musicologist (born 1955)

- זֹהַר אֵיתָן
- Born: July 20, 1955 (age 71); Kfar Saba, Israel
- Education: Tel Aviv University (B.A., M.M.A.); University of Pennsylvania (Ph.D.)
- Occupations: Poet; Composer; Music scholar
- Spouse: Nell Zink (divorced)
- Children: 1
- Writing career
- Genres: Poetry, prose poetry
- Notable works: Shu Hai Practices Javelin (1996); Ma Yesh (2007); Tongueless (2017); The Inner Cheek (2024)
- Notable awards: Israel's Ministry of Culture award for debut books (1996); Hezy Leskly award (1997); Teva award for poets (2007)

Zohar Eitan (Hebrew: זֹהַר אֵיתָן; born 20 July, 1955) is an Israeli poet, composer and music scholar whose research focuses on music cognition and perception. Currently an emeritus professor at the Buchman-Mehta School of Music at Tel Aviv University.

== Early life and education ==
Eitan born in Kfar Sava, Israel on July 20, 1955.

Earned a B.A. in Music (Theory & Composition) and Philosophy (1982) and an M.M.A. in Music Composition (1983) at Tel Aviv University, where he studied composition with Prof. Abel Ehrlich, Ph.D. in Music Theory from the University of Pennsylvania (1991), under the supervision of Leonard B. Meyer. Since 1991, Eitan has taught music theory, analysis and cognition at Tel Aviv University, becoming a full professor in 2013.

== Academic career ==
Eitan’s research fields include music theory, perception and cognition. His primary research interest is cross-modal correspondence in music - the associations between musical parameters (such as pitch, volume, and tempo) and non-auditory perceptual dimensions such as visual brightness and tactile roughness. Published dozens of research articles in central music and cognitive science journals, including Cognition, JEP-APP, Scientific Reports, Experimental Psychology, Psychology of Music and Music Perception. His book, Highpoints: A Study of Melodic Peaks, was published by the University of Pennsylvania Press.

== Poetry ==
Eitan has published four poetry books. His poems have appeared in various poetry publications in Israel and were composed by several contemporary composers, including Chaya Czernowin, Abel Ehrlich, Amnon Wolman, Kiki Keren-Huss and Hagar Kadima.

Eitan was described as “one of the distinct voices of postmodern Hebrew poetry”. Many of his poems are prose poems, some of which were originally written in English. His poems are characterized by dialogue between canonical and popular culture sources, integrating references to popular and classical music, as well as allusions to cultural, linguistic, philosophical and political concepts. His recent poetry integrates concrete Israeli reality with a dream-like, often nightmarish and surrealistic environment, derived in part from psychedelic experiences.

== Personal life ==
Divorced with 1 child. Was previously married to the American writer and media scholar Nell Zink.

== Books ==
- Highpoints: A Study of Melodic Peaks. Philadelphia: University of Pennsylvania Press. 1997. ISBN 978-0-8122-3405-3.
- Or, Amir, ed. (1996). שו-האי מתאמן בהטלת כידון [Shu Hai Practices Javelin] (in Hebrew). Helicon-Bitan. (poetry collection)
- Kaplan, Liat, ed. (2007). מה יש [Ma Yesh] (in Hebrew). Kvar / Carmel. (poetry collection)
- Kaplan, Liat, ed. (2017). שום שפה [Tongueless] (in Hebrew). Kvar / Bialik Institute. (poetry collection)
- Oz, Daniel; Schneider-Eilat, Shai, eds. (2024). הלחי הפנימית [The Inner Cheek] (in Hebrew). Gnat. (poetry collection)

== Reviews ==
- Huron, David (1998-12-01). "Review: Highpoints: A Study of Melodic Peaks, by Zohar Eitan". Music Perception. 16 (2): 257–264. doi:10.2307/40285791.
- לעאל, איריס (2008). "קולה המיוחד של סוף המאה". הארץ ספרים (in Hebrew). on Shu Hai Practices Javelin
- סתיו, שירה (2007). "הספר הזה עוד יחיה". הארץ ספרים (in Hebrew). on Ma Yesh
- הירש, אלי (2018). "על שום שפה". ידיעות אחרונות (in Hebrew). on Tongueless

== Literary awards ==
- Israel’s Ministry of Culture award for debut books (1996)
- Hezy Leskly award (1997)
- Teva award for poets (2007)
