= Nicotine (novel) =

2016 novel by Nell Zink

- Cover of hardback edition
- Author: Nell Zink
- Language: English
- Set in: New Jersey
- Published: 2016
- Publisher: Ecco Press
- Media type: Book
- Pages: 304
- ISBN: 9780062441706

Nicotine is a satirical 2016 novel by US novelist Nell Zink. It follows the character of Penny as she deals with both the death of her father and squatters in one of his properties. The book was well received by critics.

== Plot ==
Over some weeks, Penny watches her father (a prominent New Age guru) slowly die. After the funeral, which is attended by many of his followers, her mother Amalia and brother Matt push Penny to assess the condition of a house in Jersey City, New Jersey, which has been abandoned since her grandparents died there in a fire. She discovers that it has been squatted in the meantime and is named Nicotine because the activists who live there all smoke and promote smoking. Instead of evicting the squatters, she spends time getting to know them better and falls in love with two of them (Jazz and Rob). Her brother Matt then visits the house since he is eager to sell it, only to fall in love with Jazz as well.

Penny likes the anarchist subculture she finds herself in and moves into another housing co-operative called Tranquility. After an environmental protest which goes wrong and with tensions rising due to the love quadrangle, there are quarrels at the Nicotine house which culminate in Matt attacking Rob, and Jazz almost shooting Matt. The squatters flee in different directions and Matt takes possession. He decides to convert the house into an anarchist community centre named after his father, hoping that it will lure Jazz back to him. She has escaped with Rob and Sorry in a van, reaching the West Coast. When Matt's direction of the centre hits problems, he abandons New Jersey to pursue Jazz in Hawaii, allowing the reunited couple of Penny and Rob to squat the freshly constructed penthouse suite.

== Characters ==
- Penny, the main character
- Amalia, Penny's Kogi mother who has become a successful businesswoman
- Matt, Penny's half-brother who wants to gentrify the Nicotine house
- Patrick, Penny's half-brother who lives abroad
- Rob, a squatter who Penny falls in love with
- Jazz, a squatter who Penny and Matt both fall in love with
- Sorry, a squatter
- Tony, a squatter who ends up in a relationship with Amalia
- Sunshine, a squatter who lives at another housing co-operative

== Themes ==
Nell Zink satirizes the milieus in which her various characters move. She pokes fun at the anarchist squatters, calling them "ineffectual live and let live pseudo-revolutionaries" but also draws a sympathetic portrait of their existence. The house where Rob and Jazz live is called Nicotine since all the residents are smokers and they tell Penny that they are pro-smoking activists. The housing co-operative where Penny takes a room is called Tranquility and is "committed to indigenous people’s right to self‑ determination", thus the members are pleased that Penny is half Kogi. Zink herself commented that "I don’t think of it as satire because I like those people".

Another theme is grief, since Penny is dealing with the emotional fallout from the death of her father. She was the one who sat with him as his condition slowly worsened.

== Background ==
Zink claims to have drafted Nicotine in one month and received an advance payment of $425,000 from Ecco Press for it. Zink based the character of Jazz on a real-life friend and for the housing co-operatives, she drew on her experiences of living in New Jersey as a young woman.

== Reception ==
Nicotine was generally liked by reviewers. The Independent praised its humour and commented that it "proves Zink’s distinctive verve as mesmerising as ever". Reviewing the book in The Guardian, Joe Dunthorne noted the speed at which she is known to write novels and hoped "a book this good didn’t come easily", saying that "Zink writes with a joyful recklessness". Vox also enjoyed her "energetic and zingy" prose. For Kirkus Reviews, the book was "social satire with a sharp wit and a big heart".
