= Hezy Leskly =

Israeli poet and painter (1952–1994)

- חזי לסקלי
- Born: Yehezkel Leskly; 26 July 1952; Rehovot, Israel
- Died: 26 May 1994 (aged 41); Givatayim, Israel
- Occupations: Poet; choreographer; painter; dance critic
- Years active: 1970–1994

Hezy Leskly (Hebrew: חזי לסקלי; 26 July 1952 – 26 May 1994) was an Israeli poet, choreographer, painter and dance critic.

== Biography ==
Yehezkel (Hezy) Leskly was born in Rehovot to Czech-Jewish parents who survived the Holocaust from which his father’s first wife and child had perished. The family moved to Givatayim early in his childhood.

Leskly wrote his first poems at 14 and published in magazines at the age of 18. At age 22, Leskly moved to The Hague in the Netherlands where he studied dancing and art. He worked as a painter and a choreographer, and published four books of poems. One of his most widely known works was Dutch Poetry - Four Imagined Dutch Poets and a Nonexistent Israeli Poet, published in 1992.

Leskly was among the first Israelis to identify as gay and was active in many LGBT organisations. The primary topics of Leskly's poetry were homosexual life and dance.

== Death ==
Leskly died as a result of AIDS-related complications in Givatayim on 26 May 1994, at the age of 41. He was interred at Kiryat Shaul Cemetery.

== See also ==
- Dance of Israel
- Israeli literature
