= Nick O'Teen =

Comic supervillain

- Nick O'Teen as he appears in the comic Superman vs. Nick O'Teen

Publication information
- Publisher: DC Comics
- First appearance: 1980
- Created by: Health Education Council; Saatchi & Saatchi

Nick O'Teen, is a supervillain from British anti-smoking public service announcements in the 1980s, created by Saatchi & Saatchi and the Health Education Council of London in collaboration with DC Comics. The character is an enemy of Superman who uses various means to attempt to convince children to pick up tobacco smoking.

== PSA campaign ==
Nick O'Teen debuted on 26 December 1980 in a British television advertisement. He was designed by the advertising agency Saatchi & Saatchi and the advertisement was paid for by the Health Education Council (HEC). The advertisement was part of a campaign that featured television advertisements as well as comics that lasted until 1982. The campaign was built off a poster from 1979 published by the HEC, which featured Superman discouraging the use of cigarettes. The HEC received over 70,000 requests for the poster, and the money from it meant that the campaign could be expanded considerably.

Nick O'Teen was created to make the advertisements easy for children aged seven to eleven to understand. A 1979 creative brief from Saatchi & Saatchi stated:

We need advertising which states in simple terms to which children will relate that smoking is not a necessary adjunct to adult, cool or heroic behaviour. The health dangers inherent in the habit should be a secondary part of the message.

— Saatchi & Saatchi

Superman was chosen as the hero of the advertisements because he served as a role-model for children. In 1980, a report commissioned by the HEC stated that Superman "was considered to be the most appropriate character of all the super heroes to represent good against bad and advise children not to smoke," and that research "demonstrated that he is an acceptable and exciting figure to small children".

Rather than simply educate, the campaign sought to enlist children to participate in it by signing a pledge to battle Nick O'Teen by not smoking, for which they received a poster and pin buttons featuring Superman. By the time the campaign ended in 1982, the HEC had received over 800,000 requests for these products.

While the campaign was popular, there was no noticeable drop in smoking rates among children in the United Kingdom from the 1980s to the 1990s.

== Fictional character biography ==
Nick O'Teen is a mysterious villain who lurks in alleys and vacant parking lots in order to offer cigarettes to children. In the comic Superman vs. Nick O'Teen, he attempts to convince children to smoke by telling them that it will make them grow up faster, but is spotted by Clark Kent, who quickly changes into his Superman costume and blows out Nick O'Teen's match with his super-breath. Superman then informs the children that with his x-ray vision, he can see the damage that smoking causes their bodies. The rest of Nick O'Teen's advertisements follow a similar formula, with Nick O'Teen trying new methods to convince children to smoke, such as lying to them that it is easy to quit smoking if they do not like it or disguising himself as a wizard magician, before being thwarted by Superman.

In one encounter, Superman throws Nick O'Teen high into the sky, which has been interpreted by some viewers as Superman killing Nick O'Teen.

== Reception ==
While the advertisement campaign proved popular with children and public schools, many adults criticized it as symptomatic of declining standards in children's media. Concerns expressed included worries that it was "dumbed down", "too American", and "too violent". Many private schools rejected the PSAs altogether because of moral panic surrounding comic books at the time.

The Libertarian magazine Reason described one of the Nick O'Teen advertisements as a "weird, old piece of nanny-state propaganda", comparing Superman's violent treatment of Nick O'Teen to the killing of Eric Garner for allegedly selling cigarettes.

== See also ==
- Joe Camel
- Marlboro Man
