= Brainiac (story arc) =

2008 Action Comics storyline

- Cover art to Action Comics #866, art by Gary Frank.
- Publisher: DC Comics
- Publication date: August – December 2008
- Genre: Superhero
- Title(s): Action Comics #866-870
- Main character(s): Superman; Brainiac; Kara Zor-El

Creative team
- Writer: Geoff Johns
- Penciller: Gary Frank
- Inker: Jon Sibal
- Letterer: Rob Leigh
- Colorist: Brad Anderson
- Editor(s): Nachie Castro; Matt Idelson
- Hardcover: ISBN 1-4012-2087-8

"Brainiac" is a five-issue comic book story arc written by Geoff Johns and illustrated by Gary Frank, published in Action Comics #866-870 by American company DC Comics in 2008. The story includes several major plot developments regarding Superman: the death of Superman's adopted father Jonathan Kent, the return of the pre-Crisis bottled city of Kandor, and the return of the original Silver Age incarnation of the supervillain Brainiac. It also serves as a prelude to the "Superman: New Krypton" storyarc.

== Plot ==
In flashback, Brainiac is shown stealing the city of Kandor. In the present, the Daily Planet is having a staff meeting attended by Perry White, Lois Lane, Clark Kent, Jimmy Olsen, and Ron Troupe. Also present are Cat Grant and Steve Lombard, who have recently returned to the staff. Clark hears a mysterious noise with his super hearing and investigates as Superman. He discovers the noise is a Brainiac drone, sent to locate Superman. Superman promptly defeats the drone and takes it back to the Fortress of Solitude. With help from Supergirl it is revealed that Superman has never fought the real Brainiac, as all earlier encounters Superman had with Brainiac were with one of his probes. It is also revealed that Supergirl was on Krypton when Kandor was stolen, and because of this is terrified of Brainiac.

After visiting the Kents, Superman flies all through the galaxy in an attempt to track down Brainiac. He discovers his probes on one planet, and witnesses Brainiac capture a city as he did with Kandor. Brainiac then fires a missile into that planet's sun, causing the sun to explode and destroy the planet. The explosion knocks Superman unconscious and he is brought upon Brainiac's ship. When Superman awakes he escapes and makes his way around Brainiac's ship. There he discovers a room full of thousands of bottled cities, including Kandor. At this point the true Brainiac reveals himself. It is revealed that Brainiac has been collecting information on all the planets he has been destroying and the next planet he will attack is Earth, including capturing Superman and Supergirl as the last remnants of Krypton.

Brainiac's ship arrives over Metropolis and sends out probes which everyone, including Supergirl, does their best to fend off. Meanwhile, Superman fights with Brainiac. After knocking him out, Superman hears a voice that sounds distinctly like his father; it is actually the voice of his uncle Zor-El, who is alive inside the bottled city of Kandor (along with his wife Alura). As Superman and Zor-El talk, Brainiac attacks Superman from behind. Supergirl is also caught at this point and brought to Brainiac's ship just as Metropolis is encased in a bottle and a solar-aggressor missile is fired towards the Sun.

Superman is unconscious and hooked up to all the bottled cities, which allow him to hear their cries for help. Superman escapes and attacks Brainiac, before taking the bottled Metropolis and Kandor. He frees Supergirl and convinces her to stop the solar-aggressor from hitting the Sun. Superman then attacks Brainiac and knocks him out of the ship, forcing Brainiac to land on Earth. Brainiac is overwhelmed by Earth bacteria and micro-organisms. As a result, he cannot control anything on Earth and is promptly defeated by Superman. Brainiac reveals that the cities cannot be sustained outside of the ship, and Superman flies off and returns Metropolis before flying to the Arctic and releasing Kandor to its normal size.

Supergirl intercepts the solar-aggressor, preventing the Sun from being destroyed. However Brainiac has one final trick left. After reading Superman's mind while he was kidnapped, he knows where Superman's parents live, and he promptly fires a missile which explodes on the Kent farm. Although no one is hurt by the explosion itself, Jonathan Kent suffers a heart attack and dies in Martha's arms, just as Clark arrives.

The epilogue begins with Jonathan Kent's funeral. Clark looks over and sees Bruce Wayne and Alfred Pennyworth standing under a tree nearby, and after a moment with Lois, he then retreat to his family barns, where he is devastated by the loss of his adoptive father.

== Recall ==
The recalled cover of Action Comics #869, showing Superman and Jonathan "Pa" Kent enjoying a bottled beverage. The bottom of the drink's label appears to say "root beer", though the word "root" is less clear. Art by Gary Frank.

The penultimate issue of the series, Action Comics #869, was recalled at the retailer level by DC Comics for cover content. The original cover depicted Clark and his adoptive father outside the Kent farmhouse apparently holding what may be beer.

DC issued a statement to retailers that the issue was recalled, and that any copies featuring the original cover be destroyed. The next week, DC reprinted the issue featuring a cover in which the label on the bottle was changed to read, "soda pop".

== Reception ==
Johns' writing and Frank's art received praise from Mayday Trippe.

== In other media ==
=== Film ===
- The animated film Superman: Unbound (2013) was released as part of the DC Universe Animated Original Movies. It was directed by James Tucker and scripted by Bob Goodman. Actor Matt Bomer voices Superman in the film, while actresses Stana Katic and Molly Quinn voiced Lois Lane and Supergirl respectively. John Noble provided the voice of Brainiac.
- DC Universe Infinite has cited the "Brainiac" story arc on Twitter as one of the comic book stories that served James Gunn as an inspiration for his DC Universe (DCU) film Superman (2025). Gunn considered to include Brainiac as the film's villain.

=== Video games ===
Injustice 2 loosely adapts the comic in the opening scene of Brainiac taking Kandor.

== Collected editions ==
The storyline was collected in March 2009 in hardcover format:

- Superman: Brainiac (128 pages, hardcover, March 2009, ISBN 1-4012-2087-8)

In 2023, DC announced "Absolute Superman by Geoff Johns and Gary Frank", which would reprint the creative team's Superman stories, including the Brainiac storyline. It is set to be published on May 26, 2024.
