= Ron Troupe =

Fictional character in the DC comics universe; associate of Superman

- Ron Troupe, in The Adventures of Superman #481 (August 1991), art by Tom Grummett.

Publication information
- Publisher: DC Comics
- First appearance: The Adventures of Superman #480 (July 1991)
- Created by: Jerry Ordway (writer); Tom Grummett (artist)

In-story information
- Alter ego: Ronald Troupe
- Team affiliations: Daily Planet; Newstime Magazine
- Supporting character of: Superman

Ronald Dorian Troupe is a fictional character appearing in American comic books published by DC Comics. Ron Troupe has appeared in several DC Comics media, as such as television series and films.

He appears in the DC Universe film Superman, portrayed by Christopher McDonald.

== Publication history ==
Ron Troupe debuted in The Adventures of Superman #480 (July 1991) and was created by Jerry Ordway and Tom Grummett.

== Fictional character biography ==
Along with Cat Grant, he is one of the most enduring characters of the Daily Planet bullpen created in DC's Post-Crisis Universe. He first appeared in The Adventures of Superman #480 (July 1991) where he was turned down for a job at the Daily Planet by acting-editor Sam Foswell. In the following issue, he got a job at Colin Thornton's Newstime magazine when Jimmy Olsen was late for his interview. Shortly afterwards, he was fired from Newstime and hired by Perry White, who had returned to the Planet. During the Reign of the Supermen, White compared Troupe's piece on the Cyborg Superman to the first Superman stories by Lois Lane and Clark Kent.

Troupe was one of the Planet's more level-headed reporters, and not as likely as Lois or Jimmy to get into situations he cannot get out of, although he was still prepared to run risks in pursuit of a story. He twice took on the racist supervillain Bloodsport. During events following the selling of Daily Planet to LexCorp, Ron Troupe and Lois Lane's sister Lucy Lane were romantically involved. He married Lucy, and had a son, Samuel Troupe, named for Lucy's father Sam Lane.

Between the events of Infinite Crisis and The New 52 revamp of Superman continuity, Ron and Lucy's relationship was not explored. Lucy worked in Washington D.C. for the military and Ron was still in Metropolis; the canonical status of their relationship appeared to remain untouched following the events of Infinite Crisis as Ron appeared in a flashback to Sam Lane's funeral, but the events that drove the two apart were unrevealed. According to Action Comics Annual #11 (May 2008), Ron Troupe is the most highly educated reporter on staff at the Daily Planet, and has more awards than anyone else at the paper. It is also stated that he is known for his political editorials, he is an avid activist in too many groups to list, and he often butts heads with Daily Planet Sports Editor Steve Lombard on nearly everything.

His relationship with Lombard is highlighted in the 'Brainiac' storyline, where the two come into verbal conflict over the manner each chooses to cover sports related topics. However, both work together when alien robots invade the Daily Planet, even saving Cat Grant's life in the process.

The 2009-2010 miniseries Superman: Secret Origin established that Troupe, in post-Infinite Crisis continuity, was already on the staff of the Daily Planet when Clark Kent began working at the newspaper.

== In other media ==
=== Television ===
- Ron Troupe appears in Superman: The Animated Series, voiced by Dorian Harewood. This version does not wear glasses and has a mustache.
- Ron Troupe makes non-speaking cameo appearances in Justice League.
- Ron Troupe makes non-speaking cameo appearances in Justice League Unlimited.
- Ron Troupe appears in the Smallville episode "Booster", portrayed by P. J. Prinsloo.
- Ron Troupe appears in the Superman & Lois episode "A Brief Reminiscence In-Between Cataclysmic Events", portrayed by Charles Jarman.
- A female character based on Ron Troupe named Ronnie Troupe appears in My Adventures with Superman, voiced by Kenna Ramsey. She lacks glasses and is a member of the Daily Planet's "Scoop Troop" who, unlike her fellow reporters, respects interns Clark Kent, Lois Lane, and Jimmy Olsen.

=== Film ===
- Ron Troupe makes a non-speaking cameo appearance in All-Star Superman.
- Ron Troupe appears in Superman: Unbound, voiced by Michael-Leon Wooley.
- Ron Troupe appears in Reign of the Supermen, voiced by an uncredited Nyambi Nyambi.
- An alternate universe incarnation of Ron Troupe appears in Superman: Red Son, voiced by Phil LaMarr.
- Ron Troupe appears in Superman: Man of Tomorrow, voiced by Eugene Byrd.
- Ron Troupe appears in Superman (2025), portrayed by Christopher McDonald. This version is a political reporter for the Daily Planet.

=== Miscellaneous ===
- Ron Troupe appears in The Batman Strikes! #44.
- Ron Troupe appears in Smallville Season 11.
- Ron Troupe appears in a marketing article published by Wired for the film Batman v Superman: Dawn of Justice.
