= Bloodsport (character) =

Fictional comic-book character

- Design of Bloodsport (Robert DuBois) following Infinite Frontier. Art by Jonboy Meyers.

Publication information
- Publisher: DC Comics
- First appearance: Superman (vol. 2) #4 (April 1987)
- Created by: John Byrne

In-story information
- Full name: Robert DuBois
- Species: Human
- Team affiliations: Suicide Squad; Secret Society of Super-Villains
- Partnerships: Lex Luthor; Amanda Waller; Harley Quinn; Peacemaker; King Shark
- Abilities: Expert martial artist, hand-to-hand combatant, and stick fighter; Expert strategist, tactician, and field commander; Peak human physical and mental conditioning; Proficient in utilizing various high-tech equipment and weapons; Expert marksman; Has access to advance weaponry that allows for teleportation of weaponry.

Bloodsport is the name of several supervillains appearing in American comic books published by DC Comics.

The first incarnation, Robert DuBois, was created by writer and artist John Byrne, first appearing in Superman #4 (April 1987). He made sporadic appearances within Superman-related titles as an African-American who was originally a mentally ill draft dodger exploited unknowingly as a vigilante against Superman which culminated in a famous assassination attempt. The character's reinvention due to the DC Extended Universe has him as an avid patriot and a mercenary who is recruited into the Suicide Squad (Task Force X). Subsequent incarnations of Bloodsport include white supremacist Alexander Trent and an unidentified African-American mercenary.

The Robert DuBois incarnation of Bloodsport made his live-action debut in the television series Supergirl, played by David St. Louis. Idris Elba portrayed the character in the film The Suicide Squad (2021).

== Publication history ==
The first incarnation, Robert DuBois, created by writer and artist John Byrne, first appeared in Superman #4 (April 1987) as Bloodsport. The second incarnation, Alexander Trent, made his first appearance in The Adventures of Superman #507 (December 1993) and was created by writer Karl Kesel and artist Barry Kitson. The third incarnation made his first appearance in Superman #652 (July 2006) and was created by writers Kurt Busiek and Geoff Johns, and artist Pete Woods.

== Fictional character biography ==
=== Robert DuBois ===
Initial design of Robert DuBois as Bloodsport; art by John Byrne.

Robert "Bobby" DuBois is a Vietnam draft evader who had a mental breakdown and became obsessed with the Vietnam War after learning that his brother Mickey had gone in his stead. DuBois was drafted to serve in the United States Armed Forces. Upon receiving his induction notice, DuBois fled to Canada, not because he was morally opposed to the war, but because he was afraid of death. DuBois' younger brother, Michael, reported for induction in his place, passing himself off as Robert. Michael DuBois was sent into combat in Vietnam, where he lost both his arms and legs. After learning this, Robert went insane from guilt.

Later, DuBois was contacted by employees of Lex Luthor who sought a pawn to assassinate Superman. Operatives of Luthor, under the direction of a man named Kimberley, played upon DuBois's fixations on Vietnam to condition him psychologically to want to kill Superman. They also equipped DuBois with an arsenal of powerful, advanced weapons, including a Kryptonite gun. DuBois then went into action in Metropolis, calling himself Bloodsport. He now claimed that both his brother and he had served in combat in Vietnam and had been injured there. Professing rage at the citizens of Metropolis for wasting the freedom he claimed both his brother and himself fought to defend, Bloodsport indiscriminately slaughtered dozens of innocent people. In his first clash with Superman, Bloodsport severely weakened him with a Kryptonite bullet. After receiving medical aid, Superman confronted Bloodsport once more. Even Luthor, outraged by Bloodsport's murders of so many people due to the attention this would attract to his assault, attempted to stop the mad killer. Superman succeeded in causing the teleportation device Bloodsport used to bring weapons to himself to malfunction. Bloodsport then threatened to detonate his teleporter's power pack, blowing up ten square miles of the city. Superman's friend Jimmy Olsen had learned of Bloodsport's true identity and located his brother. Confronted by Michael, Bloodsport collapsed in grief and was taken into custody.

DuBois has a brief encounter with Deadshot, which was eventually broken up by Superman and Batman. He also appeared in JLA/Avengers as a villain who ambushes Vision and Aquaman with a group of other villains. He later fights Steel, but is restrained by Hal Jordan. DuBois remained in prison for several years, and eventually earned the enmity of Alexander Trent, another prisoner on Stryker's Island who had since taken up the name Bloodsport. As racial tension began to overwhelm Stryker's Island, the prison warden decided to host a boxing match between DuBois and Trent. He believed that this was the ideal way to allow the inmates to vent their frustrations without inciting further acts of violence. To safeguard the situation, the warden asked Superman to referee the match. The riot broke out, resulting in DuBois getting his hands on one of Trent's weapons and using it to blast a hole in the prison wall. DuBois ran for freedom, but was apparently shot dead by armed prison guards in the watchtower.

Following the events of Dark Nights: Death Metal, Robert DuBois was reintroduced to the DC Universe during Infinite Frontier as a world-class marksman capable of making anything into a weapon trained by his father (similarly to his DCEU counterpart). He was inspired by the bravery of his brother Mickey who was enlisted and killed in action so his mental state deteriorated, leading him to be the mercenary Bloodsport. After failing to kill Superman, he was sent to Belle Reve until he was forced into the Suicide Squad with the task of exploring the multiverse for Amanda Waller's ambitions.

== Personality ==
Robert DuBois pretends that he is a bitter Vietnam veteran who feels greatly betrayed and rejected by his country, thus he enjoys powerful and righteous anger toward his fellow Americans for wasting the freedoms invading Vietnam supposedly helped preserve. However, he has no first-hand experience about this war, ergo, his speeches and character are largely drawn from movies about the war and folk representations of Vietnam War veterans. Though at first he seemed aware that his vet persona was fictional, he grew increasingly delusional and dissociated. Described as a very violent and powerful man, DuBois was plunged into a permanent fantasy about being a soldier, and was even feared by the other dangerous prisoners at Stryker's Island Prison in Metropolis.

== Powers and abilities ==
Originally, Bloodsport possess no superhuman abilities but was considered an average hand-to-hand combatant and proficiency with firearms whom possess advance technology can teleport various high-tech weaponry originating from LexCorp to himself at will, in which said arsenal is described as Superman to be "extradimensional" in quality and quantity. His technology includes a device that enables him to teleport high-tech weaponry to him from a distant location instantaneously, with many being one-of-a-kind prototypes from advanced LexCorp research projects. He also has a wide variety of firearms, from handguns to shoulder-fired weapons.

The more recent iteration improved this concept, making him a superbly trained in all forms of combat, a world-class marksman whom has a penchant in making anything in his hands a deadly weapon, and similarly possess an arsenal of high-tech weaponry. This arsenal includes a suit that enables multiverse travel and protects the user from experiencing insanity from it and has various scanner functionalities. His weaponry also includes rifles powered by sound and kryptonite.

== Other versions ==
Alexander Trent as Bloodsport; art by Barry Kitson

- An unnamed person took up the Bloodsport mantle, and eventually teamed up with Hellgrammite, Silver Banshee, Kryptonite Man, Toyman, Puzzler, Livewire and Riot to take on Superman. Superman attempted to stop all the villains, especially Bloodsport who had attempted to shoot Jimmy Olsen. After these events, Bloodsport turned up in the crowd of villains transported to another planet in Salvation Run; and to be a quickly defeated menace by Guardian.
- Demolitia, a female version of Bloodsport, is introduced by writer David Michelinie, and artists Kieron Dwyer and Denis Rodier in Action Comics #718 (February 1996), in which she procured Bloodsport's technology.
- The Earth 3 version of Robert DuBois is a well-adjusted teacher.

=== Alexander Trent ===
Alexander "Alex" Trent is a fanatical racist. He is the son of members of a white supremacist group that both Perry White and Franklin Stern encountered in their youth. He adopts the Bloodsport name, ironically used previously by an African American. He also has a similar teleporter grafted into his body, which he can likewise use to summon weapons. He is captured by Superman after Ron Troupe destroys the warehouse from which he was teleporting his weapons. Some time later, in an effort to provide an outlet for rising tensions at Stryker's Island Prison, a boxing match between the two Bloodsports is organized. Trent is able to activate his teleporter and bring in weaponry. In the resulting confusion, DuBois is killed while trying to escape. Trent is later burned in his prison cell by his own so-called allies for showing weakness in front of DuBois. However, Trent survived as a grotesque burn victim who tried to kill Wit Saunders, but is stopped by Superman.

== In other media ==
Idris Elba as Bloodsport in The Suicide Squad.

=== Television ===
- The Robert DuBois incarnation of Bloodsport makes non-speaking appearances in Justice League Unlimited. This version is a member of the Secret Society led by Gorilla Grodd and Lex Luthor before he's killed by Darkseid.
- The Robert DuBois incarnation of Bloodsport appears in the Supergirl episode "Girl of Steel", portrayed by David St. Louis. This version was originally part of the military until he was caught stealing weaponry and is a mercenary and terrorist.

=== Film ===
- The Alexander Trent incarnation of Bloodsport appears in Justice League vs. the Fatal Five, voiced by Tom Kenny. This version is a deranged conspiracy theorist who holds the Gotham News Network crew hostage to try and prove a conspiracy about John F. Kennedy's Assassination was fake, but is stopped by Miss Martin and Batman.
- The Robert DuBois incarnation of Bloodsport appears in The Suicide Squad, portrayed by Idris Elba. This version is a Black British mercenary armed with a high-tech suit and collapsible weapons that only he can use, who is serving time in prison for shooting Superman with a Kryptonite bullet. Additionally, he has a daughter named Tyla (portrayed by Storm Reid).

=== Video games ===
- The Robert DuBois incarnation of Bloodsport appears as a playable character in DC Legends.
- The Robert DuBois incarnation of Bloodsport appears as a character summon in Scribblenauts Unmasked: A DC Comics Adventure.
- The Robert DuBois incarnation of Bloodsport, inspired by the DCEU incarnation, appears as a skin in Fortnite Battle Royale.
- The Robert DuBois incarnation of Bloodsport, inspired by the DCEU incarnation, appears as a playable character in DC Worlds Collide.

== See also ==
- List of Superman enemies
