= The Death of Superman (film) =

2018 film directed by Sam Liu

- Blu-ray cover
- Directed by: Sam Liu; Jake Castorena
- Written by: Peter J. Tomasi
- Based on: The Death of Superman by: Mike Carlin; Dan Jurgens; Roger Stern; Louise Simonson; Jerry Ordway; Karl Kesel
- Produced by: Sam Liu; Amy McKenna
- Starring: Jerry O'Connell; Rebecca Romijn; Rainn Wilson
- Edited by: Christopher D. Lozinski
- Music by: Frederik Wiedmann
- Production companies: Warner Bros. Animation; DC Entertainment
- Distributed by: Warner Bros. Home Entertainment
- Release dates: July 20, 2018 (San Diego Comic-Con); July 24, 2018 (digital)
- Running time: 81 minutes
- Country: United States
- Language: English

The Death of Superman is a 2018 American animated superhero film produced by Warner Bros. Animation and DC Entertainment. It is based on the comic book storyline of the same name, the eleventh film of the DC Animated Movie Universe and the 33rd film in the DC Universe Animated Original Movies line.

The film premiered at San Diego Comic-Con on July 20, 2018, and was released on July 24. It received a limited theatrical release by Fathom Events in January 2019. A sequel, Reign of the Supermen, was released on January 15, 2019.

== Plot ==
Superman has become a popular superhero in Metropolis and the world. After foiling an attempted abduction of the mayor by Intergang, he takes a piece of their technology to S.T.A.R. Labs for analysis. Following this, Superman is interviewed by Daily Planet reporter Lois Lane about his family heritage and the origins of how he came to Earth. Later that night, Lois meets Clark Kent's adoptive parents. Because of her little knowledge about Clark's personal life, Lois leaves upset and reconsiders their relationship.

At S.T.A.R. Labs, Dr. Silas Stone and Dr. John Henry Irons examine the technology from the Intergang attack and confirm it to be of mixed Apokoliptian (Note: A planet that invaded Earth in the 2014 film Justice League: War.) and Earth origin, leading Superman to suspect that his archenemy Lex Luthor might be to blame, though Luthor denies his involvement. Meanwhile, in space, astronauts Hank Henshaw, his wife Terri, and their crew are suddenly impacted by a meteorite, killing Terri and the crew and leaving Hank's fate unknown. After the meteor crash-lands in the ocean, Luthor and Atlantis separately send crews to investigate, where they are attacked and killed by a large being in a containment suit.

The unknown being heads toward Metropolis, attacking everything and everyone it sees in a mindless rampage until the Justice League arrives to confront it. Despite the heroes' efforts, the being injures Hawkman, Green Lantern, and the Flash in a relatively short time, then takes down Aquaman, Cyborg, Martian Manhunter and Batman. Suspecting that the Justice League may not be able to prevail, Luthor plots to seize the glory of destroying the monster himself. At a restaurant owned by Superman fan Bibbo Bibbowski, Clark confesses to Lois that he is Superman and that he loves her before he leaves to aid his comrades in the Justice League.

The being then enters Metropolis, where it fights and nearly kills Wonder Woman before Superman intervenes, destroying its suit with his heat vision. The being emerges from its suit and is revealed to be an evolving, gray-skinned, white-haired monster with incredible strength, stamina, and invulnerability. The creature, dubbed "Doomsday" by Lois, engages in a fierce battle with Superman across Metropolis, their blows causing seismic disruptions demolishing various infrastructure. When they land on a bridge leading out of the city, Superman manages to tie down the monster, but he is forced to rush to rescue several civilians, giving it the chance to escape and throw him at the news helicopter containing Lois and Jimmy. Superman recovers and manages to catch the helicopter and land it safely back in the city, but he has to return to combat Doomsday because he is the only one who can.

Superman tries to force the rampaging beast out of Earth's atmosphere, but is unable to sustain his attack, allowing Doomsday to crash on top of Superman and cause a decimating crater back in Metropolis. Doomsday emerges from the debris preparing to attack Lois, but Luthor arrives in a new mechanized suit (Note: His previous mechanized suit was destroyed by Superman in the 2016 film Justice League vs. Teen Titans.) and bombards it with an energy weapon. Despite having the upper hand, Luthor lets down his guard as he gloats, allowing Doomsday to destroy the suit using newly-developed heat vision and nearly kill Luthor, only for him to be narrowly saved by Superman. Heavily injured, Superman engages Doomsday once more in the wreckage of the Hall of Justice, but he is quickly defeated. Doomsday savages him until Lois arrives and despairingly distracts the beast, professing her love for Superman. As Doomsday prepares to kill her, Superman flies at full speed and strikes Doomsday in the face at full power, snapping Doomsday's neck and killing it. Superman is victorious, but is stabbed through the chest in the process and dies in Lois' arms, with the tragedy broadcast to the world by Jimmy.

In the aftermath, a state funeral is held for Superman, and Luthor speaks at the funeral on behalf of the Justice League. The Kent family welcomes Lois in their shared love for Superman. Luthor tries to gain possession of Doomsday's body and Superman's Kryptonian rocket ship before they are sent to S.T.A.R. Labs, but the latter flies out of a government facility on its own. Sometime later, Jimmy brings Lois back to Superman's memorial, where his coffin is empty. As Lois watches alongside a recording Jimmy, a figure resembling Superman flies away.

Meanwhile, (Note: Setting up the 2019 film Reign of the Supermen.) a clone of Superman survives numerous failed experiments from LexCorp, Irons forges his own Superman suit from steel, Superman's rocket buries itself in the North Pole, resulting in the creation of the Fortress of Solitude, and a Superman-like cyborg flies to Earth.

== Voice cast ==
| Voice actor | Character |
|---|---|
| Jerry O'Connell | Kal-El / Clark Kent / Superman |
| Rebecca Romijn | Lois Lane |
| Rainn Wilson | Lex Luthor |
| Rosario Dawson | Princess Diana / Diana Prince / Wonder Woman |
| Nathan Fillion | Hal Jordan / Green Lantern |
| Christopher Gorham | Barry Allen / Flash |
| Matt Lanter | Orin / Arthur Curry / Aquaman |
| Shemar Moore | Victor Stone / Cyborg |
| Nyambi Nyambi | J'onn J'onzz / John Jones / Martian Manhunter |
| Jason O'Mara | Bruce Wayne / Batman |
| Jonathan Adams | Mayor Booker |
| Rocky Carroll | Silas Stone; Perry White (uncredited) |
| Trevor Devall | Bruno Mannheim; Dabney Donovan |
| Paul Eiding | Jonathan Kent; Astronaut Jim (uncredited) |
| Patrick Fabian | Hank Henshaw / Cyborg Superman |
| Jennifer Hale | Martha Kent; Dr. Klyburn (uncredited); Camper (uncredited) |
| Charles Halford | Bibbo Bibbowski; Kryptonian AI / Eradicator (uncredited) |
| Erica Luttrell | Mercy Graves |
| Max Mittelman | Jimmy Olsen; Steve Lombard (uncredited) |
| Toks Olagundoye | Cat Grant |
| Rick Pasqualone | Dan Turpin |
| Amanda Troop | Maggie Sawyer; Terri Henshaw (uncredited) |
| Cress Williams | John Henry Irons; Officer (uncredited) |

Mera, Alfred Pennyworth, Damian Wayne, Hawkman, Kate Kane, and others appear in non-speaking cameos during Superman's funeral.

== Production ==
The Death of Superman is the 32nd installment in the DC Universe Animated Original Movies line, the 11th film in the DC Animated Movie Universe, and is based on the 1992—93 DC comic book storyline of the same name. The story had previously been adapted in the 2007 film Superman: Doomsday, but the film greatly altered and condensed the story to fit it within a 75-minute runtime, including the events associated with the return of Superman and that sequel-based comic. The Death of Superman was written to be much more faithful to the original story; according to DC's Tim Beedle, the film is "much less condensed" and includes many of the fan-favorite moments from the story that were left out of Doomsday. The film is co-directed by Jake Castorena and produced by Warner Bros. Animation and DC Films. According to supervising producer James Tucker, a primary theme of the film is relationships and their impact on Superman's world.

== Release ==
The Death of Superman had its premiere at San Diego Comic-Con on July 20, 2018 and was released in direct-to-video on August 7, distributed by Warner Bros. Home Entertainment on DVD, Blu-ray, and on digital distribution platforms on July 24. The film was also released in a limited theatrical release alongside Reign of the Supermen on January 13, 2019. The film was re-released on home video, edited together with its sequel, on October 1, 2019, as The Death and Return of Superman.

== Reception ==
On Rotten Tomatoes, 92% of the critics liked the film with an average rating of 7.4/10 based on 13 reviews. Kat Calamia of Newsarama called the film "One of DC's Best Animated Films in Past 5 Years", praising its epic scope and the emotional effect it invoked. Evan Narcisse, writing for i09, praised Superman's character arc, his relationship with Lois, and the manner in which DC Universe Movies adapted pre-Crisis storylines into the film's continuity to explore different permutations of those storylines, and effect a sense of threat. Jim Vejvoda, writing for IGN, pointed out that the film was the third time in 11 years that a DC film killed off Superman. Vejvoda found a "tedious" re-use of an old premise, even while conceding that the film presented that plot point in way that was more faithful to the comics storyline than either 2007's Superman: Doomsday or 2016's Batman v Superman: Dawn of Justice.

The Death of Superman peaked at #1 on the Top Ten Blu-ray Sellers for Week and the Top Five Home Media Sellers for Week, scoring a strong Blu-ray market share of 78%. The film earned $1,081,703 from domestic DVD sales and $6,529,102 from domestic Blu-ray sales, bringing its total domestic home video earnings to $6,527,374.

== Accolades ==
The Death of Superman was nominated for the Golden Reel Award for Outstanding Achievement in Sound Editing – Sound Effects, Foley, Music, Dialogue and ADR for Non-Theatrical Animated Long Form Broadcast Media award.

== Comic book tie-in ==
In August 2018, DC released a 12-part digital comic series titled The Death of Superman: Part 1, by veteran Superman writer Louise Simonson. In the US, retailer Best Buy offered an exclusive "Deluxe Edition" Blu-Ray containing a hardcover graphic novel titled "The Death of Superman: The Wake". The Best Buy graphic novel includes the last four chapters of Simonson's digital comic series.

- The Death of Superman: The Wake (ISBN 1-77950-113-7/978-1-77950-113-4, 2019-11-20): includes The Death of Superman: Part 1 #1-12.

== Sequel ==
A sequel titled Reign of the Supermen, was released on DVD and Blu-Ray on January 15, 2019. It is based on the second part of the storyline. The cast includes Cameron Monaghan as Kon-El / Conner Kent / Superboy and Charles Halford as Eradicator.
