= Intergang =

Fictional crime group in DC comics

- A giant-size Bruno Mannheim from Superman #654 (September 2006). Art by Carlos Pacheco.

Publication information
- Publisher: DC Comics
- First appearance: Superman's Pal Jimmy Olsen #133 (October 1970)
- Created by: Jack Kirby

In-story information
- Type of organization: Organized crime
- Leader(s): Darkseid; Bruno Mannheim; Lex Luthor; Moxie Mannheim
- Agent(s): Frank Sixty; Whisper A'Daire; Kyle Abbot; Morgan Edge; Vincent Edge

Intergang is a fictional organized crime syndicate appearing in American comic books published by DC Comics. Armed with technology supplied by the villainous New Gods of the planet Apokolips, they consistently appear as enemies of Superman.

Intergang appears in the TV series Lois & Clark: The New Adventures of Superman, Supergirl, Superman & Lois, the animated series Superman: The Animated Series, Young Justice, and My Adventures with Superman, and the DC Extended Universe film Black Adam (2022).

== Publication history ==
Intergang first appeared in Superman's Pal Jimmy Olsen #133 (October 1970) and was created by Jack Kirby. Members of Intergang were first shown in the first issue of Kirby's Forever People in 1971.

== Fictional organization history ==
=== Pre-Crisis ===
Intergang was founded in the 1920s by gangster Moxie Mannheim, who was later killed by rivals. It was then revived by Morgan Edge and run by Moxie's son Bruno Mannheim. Bruno receives orders and weaponry from Darkseid, who is using Intergang to help track down the Anti-Life Equation.

Morgan Edge, the head of the Galaxy Broadcasting System television network, initially appeared to have ties to Intergang. It was later revealed that this was not the real Morgan Edge, but a clone from the "Evil Factory". The original Edge would later escape with the help of Jimmy Olsen. During an ensuing battle with Intergang, the clone is killed. Following the clone's death, several other members of Intergang run Intergang in the real Edge's absence.

=== Post-Crisis ===
Vincent Edge as seen in The Adventures of Superman #500.

In post-Crisis continuity, Morgan Edge was the leader of Intergang until he suffered a heart attack due to stress. While he believed he was working for Darkseid, his Apokoliptian contact was actually DeSaad, whose only aim in supplying him with weaponry was to cause suffering. While he was in the hospital, Edge's legitimate businesses were taken over by his father Vincent Edge and Intergang was taken over by Bruno Mannheim. A later retcon established that Mannheim was the original leader of Intergang.

Eventually, Intergang was brought down by Clark Kent and Cat Grant, with Mannheim being arrested. Some time later, Mannheim's father Moxie Mannheim, a gangster who had been in prison since the 1940s after being captured by the Newsboy Legion, was released. Mannheim arranges for Dabney Donovan to transfer him into a younger cloned body and resurrect his lieutenants Ginny McCree, Mike Gunn, Noose, and Rough House in superpowered clone bodies.

Following a short-lived attempt by Morgan Edge to regain control, Lex Luthor gains control of Intergang, retaining Moxie as a figurehead. Mike Gunn is later sprung from prison by Ginny McCree, but is killed in a confrontation with the police. Following Gunn's death, McCree commits suicide. Moxie and his remaining lieutenants Noose and Rough House are captured by Superman. When last seen, Intergang was run by criminal cyberneticist Frank Sixty.

=== 52 ===
In the series 52, Intergang members Noose and Rough House visit Kahndaq and offer Adrianna Tomaz as tribute to Black Adam in exchange for safe passage for their group's smuggling activity. Both of them are killed by Adam. Later in the series, Question tells Renee Montoya that Intergang is preparing to attack Gotham City. Montoya and the Question investigate and learn that Intergang has been reorganized as a semi-religious group that venerates Cain as a heroic figure for committing the first murder. Bruno Mannheim is revealed to be the current head of Intergang as well as a cannibal who kills and eats those who refuse to join the group.

=== The New 52 ===
In 2011, The New 52 rebooted the DC universe. Gotham City has fallen to Intergang's Religion of Crime branch. During a gunfight between his gang and the police, Mister Untouchable claimed that Intergang has cut him out of the action occurring in Metropolis by selling the location of their meth laboratory to the law enforcement.

Attackers from Intergang ambush Lois Lane and Jon Kent when she is driving him home from school. They run Lois' car off the road and into the woods. While Jon knocks out one of the attackers, Lois contacts Superman who defeats the attackers. Later at their barn, Lois and Clark figure out that their attackers are from Intergang and had followed Lois from her meeting. When Lois goes to pick up Jon from school and finds him in the library, they are ambushed by Intergang agents, who attempt to kill them. Jon's superpowers manifest as he manages to break down the door, allowing him and Lois to escape.

== Membership ==
=== Leaders ===
- Moxie Mannheim - First leader of Intergang and the father of Bruno Mannheim. Known as "Boss Moxie".
- Morgan Edge - Second leader of Intergang and the son of Vincent Edge.
- Vincent Edge - Third leader of Intergang and the father of Morgan Edge.
- Bruno Mannheim - Fourth and current leader of Intergang and the son of Moxie Mannheim. Mannheim is later retroactively established to be the original leader of Intergang.
- Lex Luthor - Fifth leader of Intergang.
- Frank Sixty - A cyborg who is the sixth leader of Intergang.
- Darkseid - The benefactor of Intergang.

=== Other members ===
- Alistair Bendel-White - A fixer.
- Aku Kwesi - A criminal who was responsible for murdering Vixen's mother.
- Anomaly - A clone of murderer Floyd Barstow who briefly was a member of Moxie Mannheim's Intergang branch.
- Blackrock - Bradley Glenn wore the Blackrock armor granting him super strength and leaping ability.
- Chiller - Pale assassin and former member of the 1000 who is a foe of Booster Gold.
- Dabney Donovan - A mad scientist who worked with Moxie Mannheim. He cloned Moxie into a younger body and cloned the dead members of his gang.
- Doctor Moon
- Doctor Polaris
- Doctor Sivana
- Gillespie
- Ginny McCree - A pyrokinetic operative of Intergang and girlfriend of Mike Gunn. She later committed suicide following the death of Mike Gunn.
- Hellgrammite -
- Joe Danton - An Intergang operative who was a short-time leader following the death of Morgan Edge's clone. He was killed by a car bomb.
- Johnny "Stitches" Denetto - A crime boss who had his face peeled off by Tobias Whale. DeSaad sewed a new face onto him on Bruno Mannheim's behalf.
- Key
- Kyle Abbot - An operative for Ra's al Ghul and former member of the League of Assassins who can transform into a wolf and a werewolf-like form.
- Macho Gato - Raoul is a member of the late Benny Red's gang who is killed by Mike Gunn and Ginny McCree. Dabney Donovan obtains Raoul's DNA prior to his death and creates a clone of him named Macho Gato, who possesses a tiger-like appearance.
- Magpie
- Mantis
- Mari Nichol - The daughter of the second Doctor Polaris.
- Max Danner - An Intergang operative who become leader following Joe Danton's death.
- Mike Gunn - An operative of Intergang and boyfriend of Ginny McCree who Dabney Donovan cloned from one of Moxie's original henchmen. He can shape his hands into guns that can fire bone bullets. Donovan also made several other clones of Gunn. One clone of Gunn died fighting Superman. The second clone was shot by Moxie as a show of good faith towards Lex Luthor. The third clone was killed during a police chase following a jailbreak.
- Neutron
- Noose - An operative of Intergang who Dabney Donovan cloned from one of Moxie's original henchmen. He can extend his fingers, giving them a tentacle-like appearance. He was later killed by Black Adam.
- Parademons
- Pestilence - Member of the Four Horsemen of Apokolips.
- Prankster
- Radion - A henchman with irradiated powers.
- Rough House - A super-strong operative of Intergang who Dabney Donovan cloned from one of Moxie's original henchmen. He was later killed by Black Adam.
- Samuel Simeon - An Intergang crime boss who Superman saved from an assassin sent by SKULL.
- Shockwave (Arnold Pruett) - A Chicago-based supervillain for hire who wields armor that enables him to generate high-frequency waves.
- Steel Hand - An Intergang mobster with a prosthetic right hand made of steel. He was responsible for using a sniper to murder Thaddeus Brown before being brought to justice by Mister Miracle.
- Thaddeus Killgrave - A mad scientist with dwarfism who worked for Intergang.
- Tobias Whale - He ended up bought out by Intergang and made the CEO of Kord Industries to serve as a front for Intergang's activities.
- Torque - Dudley Soames is a detective from the Blüdhaven Police Department who was secretly allied with Blockbuster. His head was twisted 180 degrees by Blockbuster for crossing him yet survived. Due to his head remaining at this angle, Torque uses mirrored glasses to see forward.
- Toyman
- Ventriloquist
- War - Member of the Four Horsemen of Apokolips.
- Whisper A'Daire - An operative for Ra's al Ghul and former member of the League of Assassins who can transform into a king cobra or a humanoid king cobra-like creature.

== Other versions ==
A possible future incarnation of Intergang appears in "Armageddon 2001", in which they take Metropolis hostage with a nuclear bomb. However, one of their members grows nervous and detonates it too early, leading to several deaths, such as Lois Lane's, and Superman destroying every nuclear weapon on Earth.

== In other media ==
=== Television ===
- Intergang appears in Lois & Clark: The New Adventures of Superman, led by Bill Church Sr., his wife Mindy, and his son Bill Church Jr. of Multiworld Communications. This version of the group is not involved with Apokolips.
- Intergang appears in Superman: The Animated Series, initially led by Bruno Mannheim until he is killed while preparing Earth for Darkseid's invasion and Granny Goodness takes over leadership.
- Intergang appears in the Smallville episode "Stiletto". It was initially led by Ron Milano, head of the Ace o' Clubs, before Bruno Mannheim kills him and takes over leadership. Additionally, Mr. Freeze and Prankster appear as members of Intergang in the series' comic book continuation, Smallville Season 11.
- Intergang appears in Young Justice, led by Bruno Mannheim and consisting of Whisper A'Daire, Scorpia A'Daire, and Cairo DeFrey.
- Intergang appears in the Supergirl episode "Dream Weaver".
- Intergang appears in Superman & Lois, consisting of Antony "Boss" Moxie, Bruno Mannheim, Thaddeus Killgrave, Elias Orr, Aleister Hook, Mike Gunn, James Distefano, and Peia Mannheim. This version of the group was originally led by founding member Moxie before the Mannheims usurped and killed him.
- Intergang appears in My Adventures with Superman, led by Silver Banshee and consisting of Rough House and Mist. This version of the group wields Kryptonian technology.

=== Film ===
- Intergang appears in the DC Animated Movie Universe (DCAMU) films The Death of Superman and Reign of the Supermen.
- Intergang appears in Black Adam. This version of the group is an international crime syndicate.

=== Video games ===
Intergang appears in DC Universe Online, with Bruno Mannheim, Whisper A'Daire, and Kyle Abbot as prominent members.

=== Miscellaneous ===
Intergang appears in the Arrowverse tie-in comic Earth-Prime #2, consisting of Bruno Mannheim, Barrage, Hi-Tech, Loophole, Thaddeus Killgrave, Sleez, and Terra-Man.
