= Bibbo Bibbowski =

DC Comics character

- Bibbo Bibbowski as depicted in Showcase '95 #10 (September 1996). Art by Denis Rodier.

Publication information
- Publisher: DC Comics
- First appearance: The Adventures of Superman #428 (May 1987)
- Created by: Jerry Ordway; Marv Wolfman

In-story information
- Full name: Bo Bibbowski
- Team affiliations: Ace o' Clubs
- Supporting character of: Superman
- Abilities: Skilled pugilist and martial artist

Bibbo Bibbowski is a fictional character appearing in American comic books published by DC Comics. He is typically portrayed as a close friend and staunch supporter of Superman.

Bibbo Bibbowski first appeared in The Adventures of Superman #428 (May 1987) and was created by Jerry Ordway and Marv Wolfman. He is based on Ordway's friend Jo Jo Kaminski, described as a "hard-as-nails softie".

Bibbo Bibbowski has appeared in various media outside comics, primarily in association with Superman. Brad Garrett, Miguel Ferrer, and Charles Halford have voiced the character in animation.

== Fictional character biography ==
Bibbo first appears in a Suicide Slum bar called the Ace o' Clubs. When Superman comes in looking for information, Bibbo, thinking this is "some clown in a Superman suit", punches Superman, damaging his hand. He gains respect for the Man of Steel. He would later refer to Superman as his "fav'rit" hero.

During the Eradicator saga, Bibbo teams up with Lobo and Raof, a teleporter, to witness Lobo kill Superman. Lobo gives Bibbo a set of special goggles that will record the battle. All three, however, get drunk on Okaaran liquor and thus suffer loss of all memory of the battle, which Superman won by a ruse engineered by the Eradicator artifact. Additionally, Bibbo wore the goggles backwards, and thus the entire recording was of his reactions. As a result, the aliens who retained Lobo to kill Superman have no proof that there even was a battle.

Bibbo becomes a more significant part of the comic when he finds a winning lottery ticket dropped by Gangbuster and uses the money to buy the Ace o' Clubs bar and to help those living in the slum.

Bibbo attempts to assist Superman when Superman becomes involved in a fight against Doomsday. Bibbo works with Professor Hamilton on a plan to blast Doomsday with a large laser. They score a direct hit, but Doomsday is unaffected.

When Doomsday and Superman kill each other, Bibbo is on the scene and helps Hamilton use a device to try to perform CPR on Superman, despite the risk of the device killing Bibbo himself. The plan fails and Bibbo is injured. Hamilton takes over CPR but also fails.

Shortly afterward, Bibbo encounters a young man who, his family rendered homeless by Doomsday's rampage, is blatantly selling "Death of Superman" commemorative souvenirs during a public commemoration honoring the Man of Steel. At first outraged at the man's crassness, Bibbo feels some sympathy for his losses and buys his entire inventory to get him off the street, then offers him a job at the Ace O' Clubs. While Superman is gone, Bibbo takes to putting on a 'disguise' of sorts and helping out on the streets. Around this time he saves a man from suicide. This is mostly told through tall tales concerning various super-villains.

Bibbo briefly takes care of a small white dog named Krypto whom he had saved from drowning, not to be confused with the Kryptonian dog of the same name. The name was supposed to be "Krypton", but the engraver Bibbo hired to make a name tag made an intentional mistake, trying to extort more money from Bibbo (the price accorded was for six letters). Bibbo took the tag as it was.

A poster seen by the hero Aztek indicates that, at one point, Bibbo fought the hero Wildcat during a charity boxing event. Later in the series, the Ace O' Clubs bar is the site of a battle between Parasite and Aztek. Bibbo and his friends ignore the fight, playing cards instead and trusting others to handle the villain.

Bibbo and his history with the Clubs bar is examined in House of Brainiac. As Bibbo tries to help Perry White's run for mayor, he reminisces working at the bar since he was a child. Bibbo also gets involved in related mayoral issues, namely that White's opponent is leading a xenophobic campaign.

== Other versions ==
- An alternate universe version of Bibbo Bibbowski appears in Superman: The Dark Side.
- The pre-Zero Hour incarnation of Bibbo Bibbowski appears in Convergence.
- An alternate universe version of Bibbo Bibbowski appears in Absolute Batman. This version is a mixed martial arts champion competing in Gotham City.

== In other media ==
=== Television ===
- Bibbo Bibbowski appears in the Lois & Clark: The New Adventures of Superman episode "Double Jeopardy", portrayed by Troy Evans.
- Bibbo Bibbowski appears in Superman: The Animated Series, voiced by Brad Garrett. This version is an unemployed sea captain who frequents Hobb's Bay.
- Bibbo Bibbowski appears in Young Justice, voiced by Miguel Ferrer.

=== Film ===
Bibbo Bibbowski appears in the DC Animated Movie Universe films The Death of Superman and Reign of the Supermen, voiced by Charles Halford.

=== Video games ===
- Bibbo Bibbowski appears as a character summon in Scribblenauts Unmasked: A DC Comics Adventure.
- Bibbo Bibbowski makes cameo appearances in the Metropolis stage in Injustice 2.
