= Franklin Stern =

Fictional DC comics character, created 1993

Publication information
- Publisher: DC Comics
- First appearance: Superman: The Man of Steel #27 (November 1993)
- Created by: Louise Simonson (script); Jon Bogdanove (art)

In-story information
- Full name: Franklin Stern
- Team affiliations: Daily Planet

Franklin W. Stern is a fictional character appearing in American comic books published by DC Comics. He first appeared in Superman: The Man of Steel #27 (November 1993), and was named after long time DC writer Roger Stern.

== Fictional character biography ==
Franklin Stern is the owner and publisher of the Daily Planet newspaper, taking over from the TransNational Enterprises consortium which itself succeeded the villainous Lex Luthor.

Stern is a long-time friend of the editor, Perry White, although they often disagree about politics. When falling profits force him to sell the newspaper, this allows Luthor to purchase it again, with dire consequences for the Planet and its staff. Shortly afterwards, the Planet is purchased by Bruce Wayne. In The New 52 reboot continuity, the Daily Planet was bought by Morgan Edge and merged with his Galaxy Broadcasting System.

At one point Stern dated the sister of Daily Planet reporter Ron Troupe, but the outcome of this relationship is not known.

== In other media ==
- Franklin Stern appears in the Lois & Clark: The New Adventures of Superman episode "The House of Luthor", portrayed by James Earl Jones.
- Franklin Stern appears in the Smallville episode "Charade", portrayed by Blu Mankuma.
