= Superman: Man of Tomorrow =

2020 animated superhero film

- 4K Ultra HD cover
- Directed by: Chris Palmer
- Written by: Tim Sheridan
- Produced by: Jim Krieg; Kimberly S. Moreau
- Starring: Darren Criss; Zachary Quinto; Alexandra Daddario
- Edited by: Bruce A. King
- Music by: Kevin Riepl
- Production companies: Warner Bros. Animation; DC Entertainment
- Distributed by: Warner Bros. Home Entertainment
- Release date: August 23, 2020
- Running time: 86 minutes
- Country: United States
- Language: English

Superman: Man of Tomorrow is a 2020 American animated superhero film based on the DC Comics character Superman. Produced by Warner Bros. Animation, and DC Entertainment, and distributed by Warner Bros. Home Entertainment, it is the first installment in the DC Animated Movie Universe's second phase, and the sixteenth overall. The film is directed by Chris Palmer, and written by Tim Sheridan, and stars Darren Criss, Alexandra Daddario and Zachary Quinto. The film depicts the early days of Clark Kent's career as the superhero Superman. It is the 42nd film in the DC Universe Animated Original Movies line.

== Plot ==
Following the planet Krypton's destruction, Kryptonian infant Kal-El was sent by his parents to Earth where he is adopted by farmers Jonathan and Martha Kent who raise him as "Clark". Years later, Clark works for the Daily Planet as an intern and is known to the public as "the Flying Man" when using his abilities. He attends the launch of an orbital rocket telescope made by LexCorp in hopes to seek other life in the universe, but reporter Lois Lane exposes LexCorp CEO Lex Luthor of gross negligence that could lead to the destruction of Metropolis leading to his arrest. Meanwhile, Clark befriends S.T.A.R. Labs janitor Rudy Jones, who informs him about extraterrestrial experiments going on inside the lab. Suddenly, the rocket falls towards Metropolis and Clark stops the rocket as the Flying Man. Unbeknownst to Clark, he is being watched by a mysterious figure in a trench coat.

S.T.A.R. Labs detect a UFO grabbing the attention of Clark, who is confronted by an alien bounty hunter named Lobo. Lobo reveals that Clark has a bounty on him because he is the last of his kind. During the fight, which is led to S.T.A.R. Labs, Rudy is caught in the crossfire of the damage being fused with unknown substances while Lobo learns of Clark's weakness to Kryptonite. Just as Clark is being beaten by Lobo, the figure intervenes, revealing himself as a Martian to the public. While he distracts Lobo, Clark uses Earth's sun to heal and ultimately defeat Lobo. That night, the Martian introduces himself as J'onn J'onzz to the Kents and reveals Clark's Kryptonian history to him. He then warns Clark to stay hidden from humanity as they can be xenophobic despite Clark's disagreements. Elsewhere, a hospitalised Rudy awakens and discovers he has the ability to drain life, turning victims into husks.

Martha gifts Clark a new suit with an "S" imprinted at the front and a cape while the media officially coin him "Superman". Rudy attacks S.T.A.R. Labs in an attempt to gain answers from Lobo but frees him in the process after draining his cell's energy which transforms Rudy into a parasite-like creature who begins rampaging across Metropolis. Superman and J'onn work together to stop Rudy, but during the battle, Rudy is draining their powers while extracting information from them. The battle results in J'onn's death after being burnt by Rudy. A powerless Superman requests help from an imprisoned Luthor to help him restore his abilities by sending him to the sun. Through S.T.A.R. Labs CCTV footage, Superman realizes Rudy became the Parasite thanks to Lobo's grenade; it consisted of a purple foam/liquid and was designed to absorb energy, but instead bonded with Rudy's DNA to create the Parasite. Luthor deduces that the Parasite would have gained Superman's weaknesses from absorbing his energy, and reveals that he has enlisted Lobo after buying out S.T.A.R. Labs.

Lex, Clark, and Lobo devise a plan to lure the Parasite into Metropolis' power plant and use Lobo's Kryptonite ring to weaken it. The plan fails, prompting Lobo to suicide-bomb the Parasite. Luthor equips the ring with a magnifying pulse rifle and shoots the Parasite, ultimately taking it down. Luthor then double-crosses Superman but is stopped by J'onn, who had faked his death using his psychic abilities. With the plan failed, Superman tries to calm the Parasite down by using his humanity and in turn, Superman formally introduces himself to the world as Kal-El. Suddenly, the power plant begins to overload, and Parasite sacrifices himself to stop it. In the aftermath, Superman and J'onn meet at the roof of the Daily Planet where they also see Lobo alive due to his regeneration abilities. J'onn laments that they are each the last of their species but Lobo reveals there might be more Martians and Kryptonians out there, with J'onn heading off to find them.

== Voice cast ==
Voice actor	Character
Darren Criss	Kal-El / Clark Kent / Superman
Alexandra Daddario	Lois Lane
Zachary Quinto	Lex Luthor
Ike Amadi	J'onn J'onzz / Martian Manhunter
Ryan Hurst	Lobo
Brett Dalton	Rudy Jones / Parasite
Neil Flynn	Jonathan Kent
Bellamy Young	Martha Kent
Cristina Milizia	Maya, Petey, Kaylie
Eugene Byrd	Ron Troupe
April Stewart	Mrs. Ross
Piotr Michael	Perry White
David Chen	Med Student, Scientist

== Production ==
The voice cast for Superman: Man of Tomorrow was revealed in 2020, with Darren Criss, Alexandra Daddario and Zachary Quinto in the lead, as Superman, Lois Lane and Lex Luthor, respectively. In a July interview with DC Comics, writer Tim Sheridan said he drew inspiration from comics Superman: American Alien and Superman: Birthright, with a touch of several others.

== Release ==
Superman: Man of Tomorrow was revealed at San Diego Comic-Con held in July 2019. The film was released on digital on August 23, 2020, and on Blu-ray, DVD, and on 4K Ultra HD on September 8. The film was made available online for free during DC FanDome on September 12.

== Music ==
A soundtrack album by Kevin Riepl was released by WaterTower Music on September 10.

== Reception ==
Superman: Man of Tomorrow peaked at #1 of the Top Ten Blu-ray Sellers for Week and the Top Five Home Media Sellers for Week, achieving an HD market share of 100%. It earned $3,234,932 from domestic home video sales.

On the review aggregator website Rotten Tomatoes, the film has an approval rating of 93% based on 14 reviews.

Jesse Schedeen of IGN rated the film a 7 out of 10: "Superman: Man of Tomorrow is a safe and largely predictable take on the Man of Steel's iconic origin story. While that lack of narrative ambition is disappointing at times, there's a reason this particular story has endured so well over the years. Man of Tomorrow gets to the heart of Clark Kent and the emotional journey he has to experience before he can truly become Superman. With a revamped visual style and a strong voice cast, Man of Tomorrow serves as a solid start for this new animated universe".

The film was nominated for Best Superhero Film at the 2021 Critics' Choice Super Awards.
