= Cat Grant =

Fictional character from Superman franchise

- Cat Grant as she appeared on the cover of Supergirl (vol. 7) #5 (January 2017). Art by Bengal.

Publication information
- Publisher: DC Comics
- First appearance: The Adventures of Superman #424 (January 1987)
- Created by: Marv Wolfman (writer); Jerry Ordway (artist)

In-story information
- Full name: Catherine Jane "Cat" Grant
- Team affiliations: Daily Planet; Galaxy Broadcasting System
- Supporting character of: Superman; Supergirl

Catherine Jane "Cat" Grant is a fictional character appearing in American comic books published by DC Comics. Cat Grant works at the Daily Planet, and is a recurring character in the Superman franchise.

In live-action television, the character has been played by Tracy Scoggins in Lois & Clark: The New Adventures of Superman, Keri Lynn Pratt in Smallville, and Calista Flockhart in Supergirl. She is portrayed in the 2025 DC Universe film Superman by Mikaela Hoover.

== Publication history ==
Created by writer Marv Wolfman and artist Jerry Ordway, Cat Grant first appeared in The Adventures of Superman #424 (January 1987) as a gossip columnist for the Daily Planet. Introduced as a potential love interest for Clark Kent, her character added a new dimension to the Clark, Lois Lane, and Superman dynamic.

== Fictional character biography ==
Cat Grant arrives in Metropolis as a new hire for the Daily Planet. She is well known for her syndicated gossip column, which until this point was written in her native Los Angeles. Recently divorced from Joe Morgan, a husband who had driven her to drink, Cat was now a single mother with a young son named Adam Morgan, trying to get a fresh start and stay sober.

Cat is instantly attracted to Clark Kent. They become friends and even dated for a time, but eventually, this ends because Clark cannot ignore his romantic feelings for Lois Lane. He seems more interested in helping Cat fix up her life than dating her. Jimmy Olsen in turn is attracted to Cat, but she seems to either not notice or not care. Her unprofessional behavior around the office upsets both Lois and Perry White at different times and gradually ostracizes her from most of the newsroom.

To prove that she can be a "real reporter", Cat goes undercover at Galaxy Broadcasting affiliate WGBS to help Clark expose company president Morgan Edge's links to Intergang. Following this, she needs a bodyguard and Jose Delgado (aka the costumed vigilante Gangbuster) takes the job. The two become romantically linked, but Jose is resented by Cat's son Adam, who still hero-worships her ex-husband.

Cat then switches professions by joining WGBS for real to become an on-air reporter, which plays more to her strengths. She eventually gets her own talk show, The Cat Grant Show. Superman gives Cat an interview on her show, which is cut short by the rampage of Doomsday. Later, Cat is on the scene covering the events of Superman's battle with Doomsday for a live report.

She is then unexpectedly promoted to station manager. There are rumors that she got the position thanks to a relationship with Morgan's father and successor Vincent Edge. Cat ends the rumors at WGBS when she reports Edge for sexual harassment. Vincent Edge is removed from the board of WGBS, and the company settles with Cat by giving her his position.

Cat's son Adam is one of several children abducted by the criminal Toyman, and Adam is murdered when he tries to escape. Toyman is unrepentant when Cat confronts him in prison, mocking her as a poor mother. Tempted to start drinking again to deal with her grief, Cat instead refocuses on her career.

During Lex Luthor's tenure as President of the United States, Cat resigns from WGBS to accept the position of White House Press Secretary. After Luthor is impeached, Cat moves back to Los Angeles and resurrects her gossip column at a small tabloid, the Los Angeles Tattler.

=== Return ===
Cat returns to Metropolis following new developments about Toyman's involvement in the death of her son. Jimmy Olson repeats a claim from Toyman that he created an android in his likeness to replace him if he was ever incarcerated, and that a glitch in its programming caused it to become violent. Toyman argues that he would never intentionally harm a child, but refuses to accept responsibility for Adam's death.

Cat is rehired by the Planet as editor of the paper's Entertainment and Arts section. Her personality seems to have changed during her absence. Cat dresses more provocatively and acts more flirtatious than she ever has. During a conversation with Clark, she shamelessly implies that she has had breast implants. Lois Lane says that she thinks "Cat's lost it" and jokingly refers to her as a cougar. Clark tells Lois that he believes Cat is dressing and acting the way she is to cover up the painful memories of her son.

New Supergirl writer Sterling Gates told Newsarama about the direction of Grant's character: "We're integrating Supergirl's book more into the Superman universe, and that includes having a supporting cast that overlaps with that world. I'm very interested in tying her back into Metropolis and making sure that her world is a part of the Superman universe. So in my first issue, in the first three pages, I set up a foil for her in Cat Grant. And Cat Grant will be a regular supporting cast member, as will Lana Lang".

Cat develops a grudge against Supergirl because of her lack of respect and careless handling of a metahuman fight that left her slightly wounded. Cat starts a slander campaign against Supergirl in the pages of the Daily Planet, turning a large number of the Metropolis population against her. In retaliation Kara, after sending her a self-made greeting card satirizing her enmity, comes to visit her at the Planet with her new secret identity of Linda Lang, teenage niece of Lana Lang.

=== The New 52 ===
Following the events of Flashpoint, the DC Universe was re-structured with the New 52, which eliminated Cat's past marriage and her son Adam from continuity. Her personality was also softer from how she was portrayed prior to Flashpoint, being portrayed as much more professional and less flirtatious. When Clark Kent is fired from the Daily Planet, Cat decides to quit in solidarity. The two then start their own news blog, Clarkcatropolis.com.

=== DC Rebirth ===
In DC Rebirth, taking inspiration from Supergirl, Cat was re-introduced as the CEO of CatCo Worldwide Media in National City. Cat's personality has undergone a noticeable change, becoming far more arrogant, commanding, and snarky than previously seen in the New 52 and often coming off as ruthless, unapologetic, unsympathetic, and uncompromising, similar to the iteration from the television series Supergirl. However, she seemed to be a good judge of character, able to see the potential in many people, including Kara Danvers and Ben Rubel. She is also quick to protect her employees, as shown during an invasion by Cyborg Superman when she quickly organized an evacuation of CatCo's offices.

== Other versions ==
- An antimatter universe variant of Cat Grant makes a cameo appearance in JLA: Earth 2 as a bitter and mean-spirited employee of the Daily Planet marked by a hideous appearance caused by numerous plastic surgeries.
- Cat Grant makes a minor appearance in All-Star Superman #3.

== In other media ==
=== Television ===
Cat Grant as she appears in Lois & Clark: The New Adventures of Superman and Supergirl
- Cat Grant appears in the first season of Lois & Clark: The New Adventures of Superman, portrayed by Tracy Scoggins. This version is a brunette Daily Planet society columnist and rival of Lois Lane who usually dresses in provocative attire, flirts with several men, such as Superman, and displays romantic attraction towards Clark Kent.
- Cat Grant appears in the tenth season of Smallville, portrayed by Keri Lynn Pratt. This version is a reporter for the Daily Planet partnered with Clark Kent who was born Mary Louise Shroger before she changed her name to protect her son from an abusive ex-boyfriend. Additionally, she displays an anti-vigilante stance, feeling that they steal attention away from "real heroes", before eventually softening up after becoming attracted to Booster Gold and being saved by a disguised Kent.
  - Additionally, an unrelated character named Catherine Grant, whose name Cat considers a coincidence, appears in the ninth season episode "Crossfire", portrayed by Emilie Ullerup. This version is studying for two advanced degrees and served in the Peace Corps. While applying for a hosting job at a TV morning show, Kent tries to impress the producers by going on a blind date with Catherine, who eventually gets hired instead of him.
- Cat Grant appears in Young Justice, voiced by Masasa Moyo. This version is a reporter for the news channel WGBS-TV.
- Cat Grant appears in Supergirl, portrayed by Calista Flockhart. This version initially started as Perry White's assistant at the Daily Planet, during which she was reluctantly referred to as "CJ" by White, before a disguised, time-traveling Nia Nal convinced her to resign. Cat went on to become a gossip columnist, move to National City, give birth to sons Carter Grant and Adam Foster, and found her own media conglomerate, CatCo Worldwide Media. Despite being snarky and rude to her subordinates, she also serves as a role model to Kara Danvers / Supergirl throughout the series. In the first season, Cat hires Danvers as her personal assistant, uses Supergirl to boost CatCo's ratings, and deduces Danvers is Supergirl. After Danvers and Martian Manhunter seemingly convince Cat otherwise, she maintains the façade until the end of the second season. In the third season episode "Girl of Steel", Cat becomes the White House Press Secretary, leaving James Olsen in charge of CatCo. By the sixth season, Andrea Rojas gains control of CatCo until Cat eventually buys her company back, hires Danvers as the new editor-in-chief, and hosts an interview wherein Danvers reveals her identity as Supergirl during the series finale "Kara".
  - Additionally, a young Cat also appears in the sixth season, portrayed by Eliza Helm.
- Cat Grant appears in My Adventures with Superman, voiced by Melanie Minichino. This version is a member of the Daily Planet's "Scoop Troop".

=== Film ===
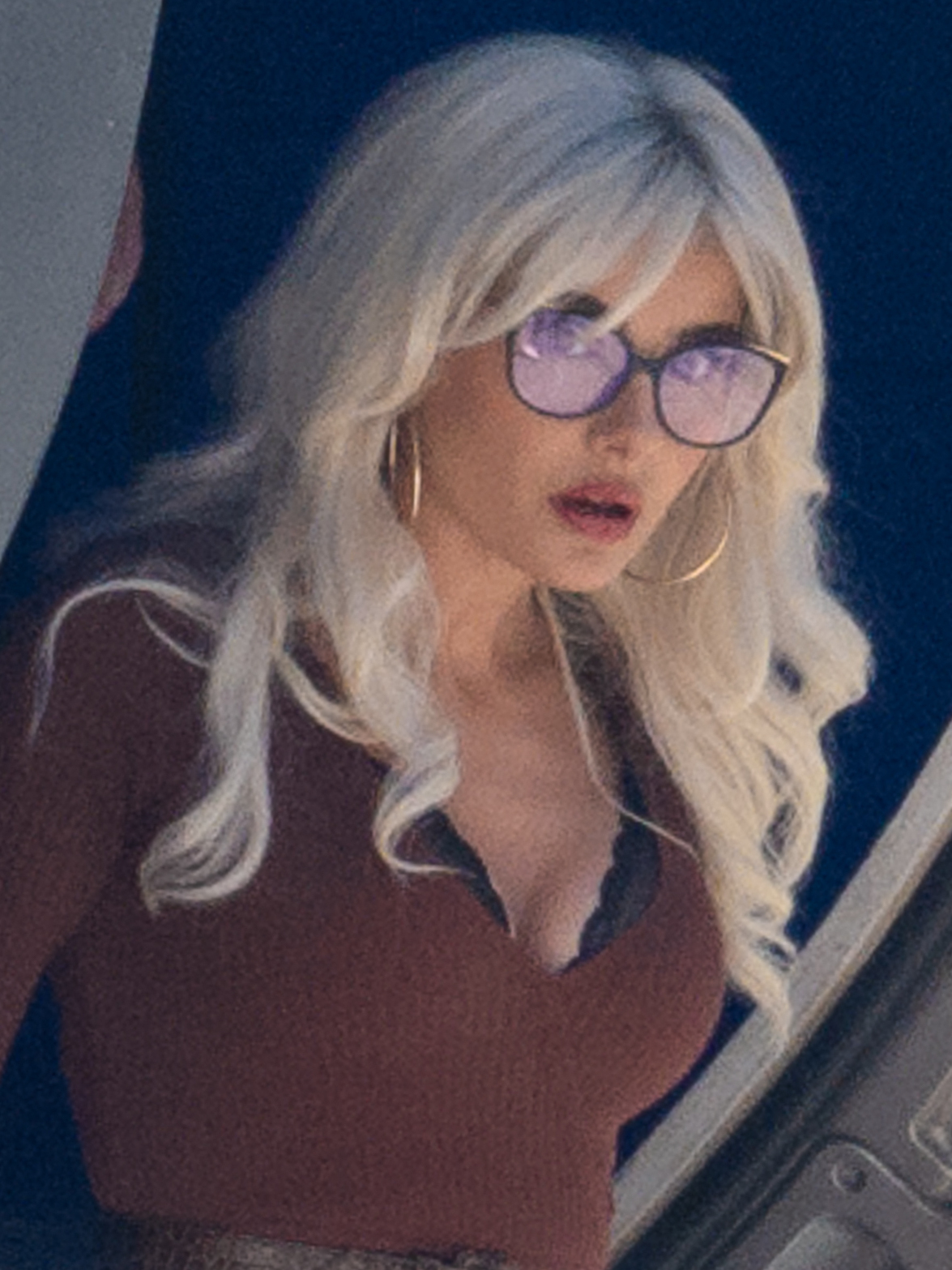
Mikaela Hoover as Cat Grant during the filming of Superman in June 2024

- Cat Grant appears in All-Star Superman, voiced by an uncredited Cathy Cavadini.
- Cat Grant makes a non-speaking appearance in Superman: Unbound.
- An African-American incarnation of Cat Grant appears in the DC Animated Movie Universe (DCAMU) films The Death of Superman and Reign of the Supermen, voiced by Toks Olagundoye.
- Cat Grant appears in Superman (2025), portrayed by Mikaela Hoover. This version is a friend to Lois Lane instead of a rival.

=== Miscellaneous ===
- Cat Grant makes a cameo appearance in The Batman Strikes! #44.
- Cat Grant appears in Superman Returns: Prequel #2 as a television reporter for Metro4News Early Edition.
