= Michael-Leon Wooley =

American actor

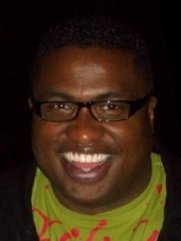
- Wooley in 2008
- Born: Fairfax, Virginia, U.S.
- Other name: Michael Leon Wooley
- Occupation: Actor
- Years active: 1992–present

Michael-Leon Wooley is an American actor. He was the voice of Louis the Alligator in Disney's Oscar-nominated animated feature film, The Princess and the Frog and played Judge Grady on the radio station WKTT in Rockstar's Grand Theft Auto IV.

== Early life ==
Wooley was born in Fairfax, Virginia, to George and Winnie Wooley. He has a twin brother, Marcus-Leon, and a younger brother, George Jr. He grew up in Bowie, Maryland. Wooley began playing the piano at age 5 and initially wanted to be a classical concert pianist. However, after participating in a high-school production of Oklahoma! he became interested in theatre.

At 16, he was given the opportunity to study piano at the Duke Ellington School of the Arts in Washington, D.C., but turned it down to instead focus on acting and singing. At age 18, Wooley was awarded a full scholarship to the American Musical and Dramatic Academy (AMDA) in New York City, one of 21 scholarships granted in a nationwide competition. He studied at AMDA for a year before embarking on his own to pursue an acting career.

Wooley performed in the national tour of Purlie, after which, worked as a singing waiter on the Spirit of New York, a dinner cruise ship that circles Manhattan.

== Career ==
=== Theatre ===
In 1992, Wooley made his Broadway debut as an understudy (Big Moe and Eat Moe) in the Clarke Peters' musical, Five Guys Named Moe. After Five Guys Named Moe he embarked on national tours with The Pointer Sisters in Ain't Misbehavin' and The Wiz with Stephanie Mills. He returned to Broadway in 2000 as Olin Britt in the Broadway revival of The Music Man, directed and choreographed by Susan Stroman.

He was also the voice of the man-eating plant, Audrey II, in the 2003 Broadway revival of the musical Little Shop of Horrors at the Virginia Theatre (renamed the August Wilson Theatre in 2005). Ben Brantley of the New York Times wrote Wooley had a "soulful bass voice" and Clive Barnes of the New York Post said Wooley as the "doom-struck voice of Audrey II" rounded out "one of the best casts on Broadway."

With conductor, Skitch Henderson, Wooley made his Carnegie Hall debut with the New York Pops as one of the "New Faces of 2004," along with other Broadway notables such as John Tartaglia and Stephanie D'Abruzzo, the stars of the Broadway's Avenue Q. The event was hosted by New York Post gossip columnist Liz Smith.

Partial list
Show	Role	Notes
American Buffalo (Broadway)	Donnie Dubrow	Understudy for Cedric the Entertainer
A Soldier's Play (National tour)	C.J. Memphis	
Ain't Misbehavin' (National tour)	Ken	Featuring The Pointer Sisters
At Least It's Pink (Off-Broadway)	Simon	Michael Patrick King, director
Five Guys Named Moe (Broadway)	Big Moe	Understudy
Floyd Collins (Regional)	Ed Bishop	
Little Shop of Horrors (Broadway)	Voice of Audrey II, the plant	
New Faces of 2004	Featured Artist	Carnegie Hall debut
Purlie (National tour)	Chorus	
The Music Man (Broadway)	Olin Britt	Susan Stroman, director and choreographer
The Wiz (National tour)	Uncle Henry	Starring Stephanie Mills
Up in the Air (The Kennedy Center)	Bull Frog	

=== Film ===
Wooley was the voice of Louis the jazz trumpet-playing alligator, in Disney's The Princess and the Frog; and Tiny Joe Dixon in the 2006 motion picture, Dreamgirls, singing "Takin' The Long Way Home" on the film's soundtrack. He also played Cocoa Butter in the Netflix Original series AJ and the Queen.

=== Voice work ===
Wooley's voice has been heard in many television ad campaigns for Reebok, General Motors, McDonald's, Dairy Queen, K-Mart, Oxygen Network and others. He was the voice of the demon boss, Twayne Boneraper, on Comedy Central's Ugly Americans. He made numerous guest appearances on Cosby, Law & Order: Special Victims Unit, The Knights of Prosperity, Now & Again, Rescue Me and The Rosie O'Donnell Show. He was a guest singer on The Penguins of Madagascar in "The Falcon and the Snow Job" and voiced the DC Comics villains Darkseid and Kalibak on the animated series, Batman: The Brave and the Bold.

From 2013 to 2014, Wooley voiced Tobias Whale in Beware the Batman. In 2014, he voiced Chill Bill from Sanjay and Craig as well as Master Lun in Kung Fu Panda: Legends of Awesomeness and Pumpers in Breadwinners. In 2015 and 2017, he was a guest voice on Penn Zero: Part-Time Hero and Acorn and Achaka in the 2015–16 video game series King's Quest. He voices Judge Grady on radio station WKTT, in the video game Grand Theft Auto IV and Dexter DeShawn in the video game Cyberpunk 2077.

=== Web series ===
In 2012, he voiced Impossibear in Pendleton Ward's Bravest Warriors which airs on Frederator's YouTube funded channel Cartoon Hangover.

== Personal life ==
Jon-Marc McDonald, a close friend and sometimes-publicist for Wooley, confirmed on his website that Wooley performed We Have To Change at a fundraiser for Barack Obama in New York City on August 11, 2008. The song was specifically written for the fundraiser by Bill Russell and Henry Krieger.

== Filmography ==
=== Film ===
Year	Title	Role	Notes
2006	Dreamgirls	Tiny Joe Dixon	Singing "Takin' the Long Way Home"
2008	Ghost Town	Medical Attorney	
2009	A Secret Promise	Booth Attendant	
2009	The Princess and the Frog	Louis the Alligator (voice)	
2012	Premium Rush	NYPD Tow Truck Driver	
2013	Superman Unbound	Ron Troupe (voice)	Direct-to-video
2015	Hotel Transylvania 2	Additional Voices	
2016	Savva: Heart of the Warrior	Morton	
2018	Hotel Transylvania 3: Summer Vacation	Additional Voices	
2022	Hotel Transylvania: Transformania	Additional Voices	
2023	Urkel Saves Santa: The Movie	Dream Santa, Plastic Reindeer (voice)	Direct-to-video
2023	Once Upon a Studio	Louis (voice)	Archival Recordings

=== Television ===
Year	Title	Role	Notes
1999–2000	Cosby	George	2 episodes
2010	The Penguins of Madagascar	Singer (voice)	Episode: "The Falcon and the Snow Job"
2010	Batman: The Brave and the Bold	Kalibak, Darkseid (voice)	2 episodes
2010–2012	Ugly Americans	Twayne Boneraper (voice)	Main role
2013–2014	Beware the Batman	Tobias Whale, Matatoa (voice)	5 episodes
2014	Sanjay and Craig	Chill Bill (voice)	Episode: "Chill Bill"
2014	Kung Fu Panda: Legends of Awesomeness	Master Lun (voice)	Episode: "Eternal Chord"
2014–2015	Breadwinners	Mr. Pumpers (voice)	Main role
2014–2017	Penn Zero: Part-Time Hero	General, Additional Voices (voice)	Recurring role
2015	Be Cool, Scooby-Doo!	Chazz (voice)	Episode: "Kitchen Frightmare"
2015–2016	Sofia the First	King Oberlyn (voice)	2 episodes
2015–2016	The Adventures of Puss in Boots	Taranis (voice)	2 episodes
2015–2017	Harvey Beaks	Officer Fredd, Lobster Guy, Skeleton Statue (voice)	Recurring role
2016	Avengers Assemble	Galen-Kor (voice)	Episode: "Captain Marvel"
2016	The Mr. Peabody & Sherman Show	Ziryab, George Crum (voice)	2 episodes
2017–2019	OK K.O.! Let's Be Heroes	Cool Sun, Bell Beefer, Galgarion, Big Bull Demon, RPG Narrator	Recurring role
2019	Young Justice	Darkseid (voice)	Episode: "Evolution"
2019	Grace and Frankie	Will	2 episodes
2019	Where's Waldo?	Tinsel (voice)	Episode: "A Wanderer Christmas"
2020	Kipo and the Age of Wonderbeasts	Tad Mulholland (voice)	3 episodes
2020	AJ and the Queen	Louis Bell, Cocoa Butter	10 episodes
2020–2022	Trolls: TrollsTopia	Lownote Jones (voice)	Main role
2021–2022	Madagascar: A Little Wild	Oggie (voice)	2 episodes
2022–2023	Hamster & Gretel	Roman Carter, The Nightmarionette (voice)	7 episodes
2023	Record of Ragnarok	Papiyas (voice)	2 episodes
2023	The Tiny Chef Show	Spoon (voice)	3 episodes
2023	Akuma-kun	Satan (voice)	
2023	City Island	Carry (voice)	
2026	Regular Show: The Lost Tapes	Thomas (voice)	Episode: Spice it Up

=== Video games ===
Year	Title	Role
2008	Grand Theft Auto IV	Judge Grady from Just or Unjust
2009	The Princess and the Frog	Louis the Alligator
2011	Ugly Americans: Apocalypsegeddon	Twayne Boneraper
2012	Sorcerers of the Magic Kingdom	Louis
2013	Grand Theft Auto V	The Local Population
2015	King's Quest	Acorn, Achaka, Goblin Man, Mordon
2017	Injustice 2	Darkseid
2020	Cyberpunk 2077	Dexter "Dex" Deshawn
2022	World of Warcraft: Dragonflight	Echo of Neltharion
