= Charles Halford =

American actor

- Born: Salt Lake City, Utah, U.S.
- Other name: Charlie Halford
- Occupation: Actor
- Years active: 2001–present

Charles Halford is an American actor. He is best known for playing Chas Chandler on the NBC series Constantine, Yago in Episode 4 Season 8 of The Walking Dead, Big John in Outer Banks, Earl in Logan Lucky and Sammy Wilds in Bad Times at the El Royale. Known for his distinctively deep voice, he also provided the voices of Konstantin in Rise of the Tomb Raider, Gorilla Grodd in Injustice 2 and Bibbo Bibbowski and the Eradicator in The Death of Superman and Reign of the Supermen.

== Filmography ==
=== Film ===
Year	Title	Role	Notes
2001	Ocean's Eleven	Bellagio Security Guard	Uncredited
2004	Baptists at Our Barbecue	Rich Paddlefin	
2005	The World's Fastest Indian	Gas Station Attendant	
2006	Blind Dating	Basketball Player	Uncredited
2007	American Pastime	Corporal Norris	
2008	The Adventures of Food Boy	Golf Coach	
2008	Friends for Life	Rutgers	
2009	The Cell 2	Deputy Finch	Direct-to-video
2009	Evil Angel	Ray	
2010	Waiting for Forever	State Trooper	
2012	Darling Companion	Christus	
2014	Small Time	Redneck	
2015	H8RZ	Officer Randals	
2015	Being Charlie	Harry	
2017	The Clapper	Ronnie	
2017	Logan Lucky	Earl	
2018	The Death of Superman	Bibbo Bibbowski (voice)	Direct-to-video
2018	Armed	Meth	
2018	Bad Times at the El Royale	Sammy Wilds	
2019	Reign of the Supermen	Bibbo Bibbowski, Eradicator (voice)	Direct-to-video
2019	The Laundromat	Pyro Guy	Uncredited
2020	Joe Bell	Will	
2022	Kimi	Tall Thug	
2023	Scooby-Doo! and Krypto, Too!	Lex Luthor (voice)	Direct-to-video
2023	Riddle of Fire	John Redrye	
2024	Horizon: An American Saga – Chapter 1	James Sykes	

=== Television ===
Year	Title	Role	Notes
2001	Cover Me: Based on the True Life of an FBI Family	James Hench	Episode: "RashoMom"
2001	The Luck of the Irish	McDermott	Television film
2006	Lightspeed	General Haade	Television film
2007	Ice Spiders	Coach Mike	Television film
2009	Dadnapped	Skunk	Television film
2010	Zeke and Luther	Man with Dog	Episode: "Local Heroes"
2010	Dark Blue	Cousin Red	Episode: "Home Sweet Home"
2011	The Event	Roman	3 episodes
2012	Body of Proof	Quentin Whitsett	Episode: "Shades of Blue"
2013	Vegas	Tony	Episode: "From This Day Forward"
2013–14	Agents of S.H.I.E.L.D.	Agent Shaw	2 episodes
2014	True Detective	Reggie Ledoux	2 episodes
2014–15	Constantine	Chas Chandler	10 episodes
2015	NCIS: Los Angeles	Decker	Episode: "Rage"
2015	Law & Order: Special Victims Unit	Johnny Drake	2 episodes
2015	Supergirl	Jemm	Episode: "Human for a Day"
2016	The Night Shift	Justin Wilson	2 episodes
2016	Lucifer	Boris Sokolov	Episode: "My Little Monkey"
2016	Rectify	Nate	4 episodes
2017	Blindspot	Abel Marx	Episode: "Devil Never Even Lived"
2017	Longmire	Hawk Robinson	Episode: "Thank You, Victoria"
2017	The Walking Dead	Yago	2 episodes
2017–20	Rapunzel's Tangled Adventure	Vladimir (voice)	10 episodes
2019	Into the Dark	Gerald	Episode: "I'm Just F*cking with You"
2019	Reprisal	Percy Montgomery	3 episodes
2020–23	Outer Banks	Big John	13 episodes
2021	Chicago P.D.	Logan Teague	Episode: "Instinct"
2021	Blade Runner: Black Lotus	Gang Leader (voice)	English dub Episode: "City of Angels"

=== Video games ===
Year	Title	Role
2011	Star Wars: The Old Republic	Captain Cormac, Gezda, Zank Helrott
2015	Fallout 4	Knight Gavil, Winlock
2015	Rise of the Tomb Raider	Konstantin
2016	The Walking Dead: A New Frontier	Lonnie
2017	Injustice 2	Gorilla Grodd
2018	God of War	Additional voices
2018	Spyro Reignited Trilogy	Additional voices
2023	Immortals of Aveum	Rook
