= Steve Lombard =

- Steve Lombard's first appearance, art by Curt Swan.

Publication information
- Publisher: DC Comics
- First appearance: Superman #264 (June 1973)
- Created by: Cary Bates; Curt Swan

In-story information
- Full name: Steven Lombard
- Team affiliations: Daily Planet; Galaxy Communications
- Supporting character of: Superman

Steve Lombard is a fictional character appearing in American comic books published by DC Comics.

The character made his cinematic debut in the DC Extended Universe in the 2013 film Man of Steel, played by Michael Kelly. Lombard appears in the DC Universe in the 2025 film Superman, played by Beck Bennett.

== Publication history ==
Steve Lombard first appeared in Superman #264 (June 1973) in a story written by Cary Bates and penciled by Curt Swan. When editor Julius Schwartz suggested adding a sportscaster to Clark Kent's news reporter, Bates decided to create a workplace adversary for Kent to contrast with Kent's friendly relationship with the other characters, drawing partial inspiration from the character Ted Baxter of The Mary Tyler Moore Show. Lombard's physical model was real-life football star Joe Namath.

For several years after Steve Lombard's debut, he appeared in nearly every published Superman story. Action Comics writer Martin Pasko later attempted to explain the character's popularity:

"... Lombard is one of the few examples of a character that all of us Superman scripters at that time wrote in more or less the same way - as opposed to, say, the way Lana Lang seemed to be a totally different character when she'd show up in Action on occasion. I think that's because Lombard was one of the most sharply drawn and purposefully designed (though not particularly complex) characters I've ever handled - the most clearly communicated idea I've ever heard from an editor and the writer who co-created it: the jock doofus unwittingly trying to bust Superman's cajónes. The audience waits for it, knowing that a hotfoot with a match won't trump a hotfoot from heat vision, or whatever. And I gather the other Superman writers thought so, too. That's why Lombard became, for me, at least, one of the best examples of what, in sitcoms, we call the 'run-through character'. That's certainly what Ted Baxter was on TV: the character you knew you could 'run through' a scene and get laughs just from his showing up. ... The audience starts laughing when they show up because they're laughing at what they're imagining is gonna happen. They're 'waiting for it'".

Bates wrote Steve Lombard out of the comic in Superman #384, though his final pre-Crisis on Infinite Earths appearance was not until Superman #413.

== Fictional character biography ==
=== Pre-Crisis ===
In pre-Crisis continuity, Steve Lombard is a quarterback for the fictional football team the Metropolis Meteors. The day before his team is to play in the Super Bowl, Steve exacerbates existing injuries to his knees while saving a baby falling from a building. An experimental radiation treatment cures his knees, but also produces an energy clone of him. Initially taking credit for the energy being's performance, Lombard publicly confesses the truth after the being goes on a rampage and is defeated by Superman. Steve resigns from the Meteors and retires from football over his actions, leading Morgan Edge to hire him as a sportscaster for Galaxy Broadcasting, working alongside anchor Clark Kent on the Six O'Clock News.

Steve is portrayed as brash and arrogant, and often plays childish pranks on Clark. However, Steve also considers Clark one of his few real friends, since he takes Steve's behavior in stride and never bears him a grudge. Steve has a brother named Vernon, who is a doctor, and a nephew named Jaime. Steve also has an aunt, Kaye Daye, who is a mystery novelist who works with the Mystery Analysts of Gotham City. Morgan Edge ultimately fires Steve after many years due to his declining popularity with the viewing audience. Steve goes to Clark's apartment seeking solace, only to be attacked by a former college roommate who did not shrug off Steve's pranks as well as Clark did, and obtained superhuman powers to get revenge. In a rare display of genuine courage and humanity, Steve forces Clark to safety before confronting his opponent, although Clark returns as Superman and rescues Steve.

=== Post-Crisis ===
Lombard was not part of the original reboot of the Superman storyline that began in The Man of Steel. His first post-Crisis appearance is as a news anchor on WGBS-TV in The Adventures of Superman #467 (June 1990).

In post-Crisis continuity, Steve works for the Daily Planet, as the editor of the Sports section. Perry White states Steve has recently returned to the paper, so it can be assumed that Steve used to work there before leaving to work for WGBS. Action Comics Annual #11 (May 2008) gives the following information on Steve: "Sports Reporter. Steve Lombard played football in high school, college, and briefly for the pros. He sees himself as a man's man, everything Clark Kent is not in fact. He is a walking encyclopedia of sports trivia and put-downs. Lombard cannot figure out why Lois Lane does not throw herself at him". It is also stated that Steve often butts heads with coworker Ron Troupe.

The 2009-2010 miniseries Superman: Secret Origin established that Lombard, in post-Infinite Crisis continuity, was already on the staff of the Daily Planet when Clark began working there.

== Alternate versions ==
Steve Lombard, based on the post-Crisis incarnation, appears in All-Star Superman. This version works as a sportswriter at the Daily Planet.

== In other media ==
=== Television ===
- Steve Lombard makes a non-speaking appearance in the DC Super Hero Girls episode "#EmperorPenguin".
- Steve Lombard appears in the Young Justice episode "Evolution", voiced by David Kaye. This version hosts the Steve Lombard Sports Show radio series.
- Steve Lombard appears in My Adventures with Superman, voiced by Vincent Tong. This version is a member of the Daily Planet's "Scoop Troop".

=== Film ===
- Steve Lombard appears in All-Star Superman, voiced by Kevin Michael Richardson.
- Steve Lombard appears in Superman: Unbound, voiced by Diedrich Bader.
- Steve Lombard appears in Man of Steel, portrayed by Michael Kelly.
- Steve Lombard appears in the DC Animated Movie Universe (DCAMU) films The Death of Superman and Reign of the Supermen, voiced by an uncredited Max Mittelman.
- Steve Lombard appears in Superman (2025), portrayed by Beck Bennett.

=== Miscellaneous ===
- Steve Lombard appears in The Batman Strikes! #44.
- Steve Lombard appears in Smallville Season 11: Chaos #2.
