= Reign of the Supermen (film) =

2019 animated film directed by Sam Liu

- Blu-ray cover
- Directed by: Sam Liu
- Written by: Tim Sheridan; Jim Krieg
- Based on: Characters from DC Comics
- Produced by: Sam Liu
- Starring: Jerry O'Connell; Rebecca Romjin; Rainn Wilson
- Edited by: Christopher D. Lozinski
- Music by: Frederik Wiedmann
- Production companies: Warner Bros. Animation; DC Entertainment
- Distributed by: Warner Bros. Home Entertainment
- Release dates: January 13, 2019 (limited); January 15, 2019 (digital download and Blu-ray)
- Running time: 87 minutes
- Country: United States
- Language: English
- Box office: $4,223

Reign of the Supermen is a 2019 American animated superhero film produced by Warner Bros. Animation and DC Entertainment. The film is a direct sequel to The Death of Superman (2018) and is based on the comic book story arc of the same name in "The Death of Superman" event. It is the twelfth film of the DC Animated Movie Universe and the 35th film of the DC Universe Animated Original Movies line.

The film was released in limited Fathom Events theaters on January 13, 2019, and to digital and Blu-ray two days later.

== Plot ==
Six months following Superman's sacrifice and death at the hands of Doomsday, (Note: As depicted in The Death of Superman.) the crime rate in Metropolis has spread, while four new controversial Supermen have emerged. Lois Lane and Clark Kent's adoptive parents are still in mourning over his death. Lois has been investigating the new Supermen by gathering information from different sources.

Lex Luthor introduces a new Superman to the world at a press conference, who Lois discovers is actually a clone – Superboy created by Dr. Dabney Donovan. The conference is interrupted by the Eradicator, Steel, and Cyborg Superman (who claims he is the true Superman) who fight each other until both the Eradicator and Cyborg Superman leave the battle. Unknown to anyone, Superman has barely survived his battle with Doomsday and is recuperating at the Fortress of Solitude as the Eradicator rejuvenates his DNA. That night, Cyborg Superman visits Lois in an attempt to convince her that he is not a fake. Luthor becomes frustrated with Superboy for his childish actions.

The Justice League, accompanied by Superboy, are hired as bodyguards for the President, who is unveiling their new Watchtower. The presentation is suddenly attacked by Parademons, summoned via a boom tube portal. Cyborg Superman rescues the president and is announced to the world as the true Superman as the portal falls apart and lands on The Justice League, who are declared dead. Angered, Luthor reveals to Superboy he shares his DNA and kills Donovan by sending an army of monsters after he explains to Luthor that Superboy is the best clone they could create. With the help of Steel, Lois discovers Cyborg Superman is the deceased astronaut Hank Henshaw who blames Superman for not saving him and his wife and has decided to destroy his legacy by impersonating him. Henshaw reveals to the world his new "Cyber Corps" militia, which are created by Mother Boxes infused with humans.

Steel tracks the Eradicator to the Fortress, where he learns that Superman is currently going through a revitalization cycle, and the two engage in a fight. The fight is broadcast to Lois' phone. Lois realizes that the Eradicator is a hologram from Superman's ship's matrix, created to protect Superman. The fight stops when a heavily weakened Superman is revived. Through Henshaw's technology, Luthor and Lois discover that Henshaw is being controlled by Darkseid from Apokolips, (Note: Introduced in Justice League: War.) who created Doomsday and orchestrated its attack on Earth.

Superman, Superboy and Steel head towards Metropolis. Luthor sends Lois to the Watchtower as he uses a Mother Box to rescue the League. Darkseid continues to torment Henshaw for his failure to keep Superman dead and attempts to open a portal for his arrival, using the Mother Box infused with Henshaw. After being mocked by Lois, Henshaw rips out the Mother Box inside him, deactivating Darkseid's control over the Cyber Corps. Before Henshaw can kill Lois, Superman arrives. Henshaw constantly blames Superman for his wife Terri's death. Superman eventually regains his full power from the sun and deactivates Henshaw by stabbing his forehead with a crystal taken from the Fortress of Solitude containing the Eradicator program. Henshaw's defeat also deactivates the Cyber Corps, but kills them in the process.

In the aftermath, Martian Manhunter disguises himself as Superman to announce Clark Kent's safe return with the cover up of him being missing during the Doomsday attack. Superboy is sent to live with the Kents and is named "Conner". In a post-credit scene, the League gather at the Watchtower to confront Darkseid themselves, (Note: Setting up the events of Justice League Dark: Apokolips War.) with Luthor inviting himself in.

== Voice cast ==
Voice actor	Character
Jerry O'Connell	Kal-El / Clark Kent / Superman, Hank Henshaw (voice modulation)
Rebecca Romijn	Lois Lane
Rainn Wilson	Lex Luthor
Cameron Monaghan	Kon-El / Conner Kent / Superboy
Cress Williams	John Henry Irons / Steel
Patrick Fabian	Hank Henshaw / Cyborg Superman
Jason O'Mara	Bruce Wayne / Batman
Rosario Dawson	Diana Prince / Wonder Woman
Shemar Moore	Victor Stone / Cyborg
Nathan Fillion	Hal Jordan / Green Lantern
Christopher Gorham	Barry Allen / The Flash
Nyambi Nyambi	J'onn J'onzz / John Jones / Martian Manhunter; Ron Troupe (uncredited)
Tony Todd	Uxas / Darkseid
Charles Halford	Bibbo Bibbowski; Eradicator
Rocky Carroll	Perry White
Toks Olagundoye	Cat Grant; Becky (uncredited)
Max Mittelman	Jimmy Olsen; Steve Lombard (uncredited); Eric (uncredited)
Paul Eiding	Jonathan Kent; Cemetery Worker (uncredited)
Jennifer Hale	Martha Kent; President Joan Dale (uncredited); Watchtower Computer
Trevor Devall	Dabney Donovan; G. Gordon Godfrey (uncredited); Droid #2 (uncredited); Snakey Doyle (uncredited)
Erica Luttrell	Mercy Graves; Droid #1 (uncredited); Sullivan (uncredited)

== Release ==
Reign of the Supermen was released and distributed by Warner Bros. Home Entertainment in limited Fathom Events theaters on January 13 and 14, 2019, followed by Digital HD on January 15, then Ultra HD Blu-ray Combo Pack and Blu-ray Combo Pack on January 29, but disc releases were moved up to January 15. The film was re-released on home video, edited together with its predecessor, on October 1 as The Death and Return of Superman. The Limited Edition gift-set also includes a Steel figure, Superman: Doomsday, and bonus animated episodes (Blu-ray).

== Reception ==
Reign of the Supermen earned $3,413,951 from domestic home video sales.

== The Death and Return of Superman ==
Shortly after the release of Reign of the Supermen, it and The Death of Superman were edited together into a single feature. On Rotten Tomatoes, the film has a 93% score based on reviews from 15 critics.
