= Morgan Edge =

Fictional DC comics character

- Morgan Edge as he first appeared. Art by Jack Kirby and Vince Colletta.

Publication information
- Publisher: DC Comics
- First appearance: Superman's Pal, Jimmy Olsen #133 (October 1970)
- Created by: Jack Kirby (writer & artist)

In-story information
- Alter ego: Morris Edelstein
- Species: Human
- Team affiliations: Intergang; Galaxy Communications; Superman Revenge Squad

Morgan Edge is a fictional character appearing in American comic books published by DC Comics. Originally a supporting character, he is a media mogul who acquires the Daily Planet and employs Clark Kent as a television journalist for his WGBS TV network. After the Crisis on Infinite Earth continuity reboot, Edge is depicted as a member of Intergang.

Edge has been adapted into various media outside comics, with Rutger Hauer and Patrick Bergin portraying him in Smallville and Adrian Pasdar in Supergirl. In Superman & Lois, Adam Rayner played a version of the character who is also Superman's Kryptonian half-brother Tal-Rho.

== Publication history ==
Morgan Edge first appeared in Superman's Pal, Jimmy Olsen #133 and was created by Jack Kirby. Kirby based Edge's physical appearance on actor Kevin McCarthy, while his personality was inspired by television executive James T. Aubrey. According to Kirby's production assistant Mark Evanier, Kirby "wanted to explore the theme of organized crime gaining a foothold in corporate America - particularly a giant media conglomerate. Given the shady background of the company that acquired Warner Bros. and DC [i.e. Kinney National Company], it was something of an inside joke." However, under prodding from editorial staff who preferred Edge to be an ongoing supporting character rather than a villain who would ultimately have to be brought to justice and written out of the series, the Edge connected to Intergang was revealed to be an imposter.

== Fictional character biography ==
=== Pre-Crisis ===
In his original incarnation, Edge was the president of the Galaxy Broadcasting System (owners of television station WGBS), a media corporation that eventually bought the Daily Planet. Edge was in many ways a stereotype of a ruthless capitalist, intervening in the Planet's homey atmosphere and challenging the authority of the somewhat older Perry White, but he was a decent man who had moments of good-heartedness and maintained reasonably friendly relationships with most of his employees, including Clark Kent. Following the takeover of the Planet, Edge transferred Kent to the news division, making him a traveling correspondent and later anchorman on WGBS. This move added several TV co-workers to the Superman supporting cast, including producer Josh Coyle, sports broadcaster Steve Lombard, weather forecaster Oscar Asherman, and co-anchor Lana Lang, Clark's childhood friend.

As one of the wealthiest men in Metropolis, Edge was a major political figure in the city and frequently encountered Superman, the subject of many of his network's news stories, whom he, like most others, failed to realize was also Clark Kent. Although rarely integral to a plotline, Edge was a supporting character in many Superman stories.

For a while, it appeared that Edge was connected to the Apokolips-sponsored crime organisation Intergang, but this was revealed to be a clone created by the 'Evil Factory', a genetics laboratory working for Darkseid.

It was later revealed that Morgan Edge is Jewish and was born Morris Edelstein before changing his name, as he was ashamed of his background and worked to keep it secret.

=== Post-Crisis ===
When DC continuity was rebooted after Crisis on Infinite Earths, Edge remained president of WGBS, but his ties to the Planet and friendship with Superman were retconned away, and he was genuinely connected to Intergang. He was eventually exposed by the Daily Planet, in articles by Clark Kent and Cat Grant, who was working for WGBS undercover. Edge was imprisoned, but even managed to cause trouble there by publishing his autobiography On the Edge, which dumped upon his father Vincent Edge as well as Cat Grant, revealing that she slept her way into a scoop. After his release from jail, Edge returned as sponsor of the Superman Revenge Squad.

=== The New 52 ===
In 2011, "The New 52" rebooted the DC universe. Morgan Edge appears as an African-American media mogul and the new owner of the Daily Planet. Although a tough businessman, Edge did recognize talent, and awarded Lois Lane the editorship of the Daily Planet.

Edge's multiple media holdings become a benefit to Superman as Lois Lane, now director of Edge's Metropolis news station, has said building's security cameras "hacked" to provide vital intelligence on a rampaging villain.

Prior to DC Rebirth, in the last issue of the 2011 Justice League series, it is mentioned that Lex Luthor bought the Daily Planet from Edge.

== In other media ==
=== Television ===
- Morgan Edge appears in Smallville, initially portrayed by Rutger Hauer and later by Patrick Bergin. This version is a Metropolis crime lord and old friend of Lionel Luthor, who he grew up with in Suicide Slum. He later conspires with Lionel to break Lex Luthor's psyche before being killed in a shootout.
- Morgan Edge appears in the Justice League episode "Secret Society", voiced by an uncredited Brian George. This version is a collector of unique oddities and displays no moral qualms against collecting sentient beings, such as Clayface, whom he kept in a jar for some time until the Secret Society rescues him. It is implied to the viewers that Killer Frost froze him once he served his purpose.
- Morgan Edge appears in the third season of Supergirl, portrayed by Adrian Pasdar. This version is an immoral real estate developer who runs Edge Global.
- A variant of Morgan Edge appears in Superman & Lois, portrayed by Adam Rayner. This version is a Kryptonian named Tal-Rho, the son of Lara Lor-Van and Zeta-Rho and the maternal half-brother of Superman. Like Superman, Tal-Rho was also sent off of Krypton in an escape pod. After landing in England, he comes into conflict with the local townspeople and is captured and experimented on, developing a hatred of humanity in the process. After escaping, he develops the identity of "Morgan Edge", an intelligent, eloquent and impassioned self-made mogul and the head of EnerCorp and Galaxy Holdings. In the first season, he enacts a plot to resurrect Krypton on Earth by implanting Kryptonian consciousnesses into human hosts using X-Kryptonite and the Eradicator, only to be defeated by Superman and John Henry Irons, and remanded to a cell with red solar lighting. In the second season, Tal-Rho assists Superman in fighting Ally Allston before relocating to the Inverse World.
  - Tal-Rho's Inverse World counterpart appears in the episode "Bizarros in a Bizarro World", also portrayed by Rayner. He is married to his version of Lana Lang and is on good terms with Bizarro before being killed by Allston.

=== Video games ===
Morgan Edge appears as a character summon in Scribblenauts Unmasked: A DC Comics Adventure.

== See also ==
- List of Superman enemies
