= Superman: Unbound =

2013 animated film directed by James Tucker

- DVD cover
- Directed by: James Tucker
- Screenplay by: Bob Goodman
- Based on: Superman: Brainiac by Geoff Johns
- Produced by: James Tucker; Alan Burnett
- Starring: Matt Bomer; Stana Katic; John Noble; Molly Quinn
- Cinematography: Al Jean
- Edited by: Christopher D. Lozinski
- Music by: Kevin Kliesch
- Production companies: Warner Premiere; Warner Bros. Animation; DC Entertainment
- Distributed by: Warner Home Video
- Release date: May 7, 2013
- Running time: 75 minutes
- Country: United States
- Language: English

Superman: Unbound is a 2013 American animated superhero film based on the 2008 comic book story arc "Superman: Brainiac" by Geoff Johns. It was directed by James Tucker and written by Bob Goodman. It is the 17th film of the DC Universe Animated Original Movies.

== Plot ==
Offering herself as a hostage, Lois Lane is caught in an aerial confrontation between her terrorist captors and Supergirl before Superman arrives to save the day. Soon after, knowing Superman's civilian identity, Lois attempts to get Clark Kent to make their relationship public despite his fear of the consequences, but their argument is halted by a Daily Planet staff meeting before Clark leaves after being alerted to an approaching meteor. Intercepting it, Superman learns the meteor is actually a robot that he promptly defeats before activating its beacon and taking it to the Fortress of Solitude. With help from Supergirl, Superman learns the robot is a drone controlled by a being named Brainiac, a Coluan scientist who subjected himself to extensive enhancements, turning him into a muscular, red-eyed giant with computer-like components and enhanced physical abilities comparable to Superman's. Supergirl, horrified at seeing Brainiac's robot, reveals her experience with the monster. Brainiac had seized and miniaturized Krypton's capital city of Kandor prior to the planet's destruction with her parents attempting to track him down before they mysteriously lost contact with Krypton. She is now worried that Brainiac will do to Earth what he did to Kandor.

Fearing more drones will come, Superman flies through the galaxy with a Kryptonian spacecraft in an attempt to track down Brainiac before finding his drones attacking a planet. Though he attempts to stop them, Superman witnesses Brainiac capture the planet's capital like he did with Kandor before firing a missile to consume the planet in its exploding sun. The explosion knocks Superman unconscious, and he is brought on board Brainiac's ship. Coming to in the examination room, he fights his way through the vessel before discovering a room full of bottled cities and being attacked by Brainiac. At this point, confirming that he spared Krypton because of its eventual destruction, it is shown that Brainiac has been collecting information on the planets he visited before destroying them. Using Superman's spacecraft and his telepathic abilities, Brainiac discovers that he has been living on Earth. Brainiac decides to chart a course to Earth while sending Superman into Kandor. Inside Kandor, his strength waning due to the artificial red sun, Superman meets his uncle Zor-El and aunt Alura. They explain that Brainiac was instructed to learn all that is knowable about the galaxy. Being a cyborg, Brainiac interpreted his directive literally and realized that he could not achieve this goal because life keeps changing. His knowledge of one world would become out-of-date as soon as he moved on to the next world. Brainiac therefore destroys civilizations after studying them so that they cannot change further, thus leaving him with literally complete and up-to-date knowledge of them.

Superman formulates a plan and escapes Kandor using the subjugator robots. From there, Superman disables Brainiac's ship and takes Kandor with him back to Earth. At that time, Lois learns from Supergirl why Superman left and alerts the Pentagon of a possible invasion by Brainiac, who repairs his ship and arrives in Metropolis.

Despite everyone doing their best to fend his drones off, Metropolis is encased in a bottle and both Superman and Supergirl are captured. Having hooked Superman up to his ship, Brainiac reveals that Earth offers nothing to him, tortures Superman by overloading his mind with data, and attempts to destroy the planet. However, telling his captor what Earth means to him, Superman breaks free and then frees Supergirl and convinces her to stop the Solar-Aggressor from hitting the sun. Remembering Zor-El's words about Brainiac's ideals, Superman knocks him out of the ship and they crash into a swamp. As he fights Brainiac, Superman forces him to experience the chaos of life itself outside of the safe, artificial environments he has created. The combined strain takes its toll on Brainiac, and he combusts. After restoring Metropolis, taking Kandor to another planet similar to Krypton to restore its normal size, and establishing a colony where they can rebuild, Superman (as Clark Kent) makes his love life with Lois public with a marriage proposal.

In a post-credits scene, Brainiac's remains in the Fortress of Solitude glow, indicating that Brainiac still has some degree of his power.

== Cast ==
- Matt Bomer as Kal-El / Clark Kent / Superman
- Stana Katic as Lois Lane
- John Noble as Brainiac
- Molly Quinn as Kara Zor-El / Supergirl
- Diedrich Bader as Steve Lombard
- Alexander Gould as Jimmy Olsen
- Frances Conroy as Martha Kent
- Stephen Root as Zor-El
- Jason Beghe as Terrorist Leader
- Sirena Irwin as Alura
- Wade Williams as Perry White
- Melissa Disney as Thara Ak-Var
- Michael-Leon Wooley as Ron Troupe
- Will Yun Lee as Parasoldier Leader
- Ian James Corlett as Kryptonian #1
- Andrea Romano as News Anchor #2, Superman's Ship

== Reception ==
Superman: Unbound received positive reviews. Based on five reviews, it has a rating of 100% on Rotten Tomatoes with an average rating of 7.4/10. IGN gave the film a 6.5 out of 10. Brian Lowry of Variety stated "the 75-minute film boasts some impressive animation and action sequences – essentially getting the job done, without by any means approaching the operatic majesty of the studio's recent two-part epic The Dark Knight Returns". Common Sense Media gave the film a 4 star rating out of 5, commenting "Superman fights, learns life lessons in animated thriller".

The film earned $1,686,042 from domestic DVD sales and $1,804,778 from domestic Blu-ray sales, bringing its total domestic home video earnings to $3,490,820.
