= Daily Planet =

Fictional broadsheet newspaper

Publication information
- First appearance: Action Comics #23 (April 1940)

In-story information
- Type of business: Newspaper
- Owner(s): Morgan Edge; Franklin Stern; Lex Luthor; Bruce Wayne
- Employee(s): Perry White (editor-in-chief); Clark Kent; Lois Lane; Jimmy Olsen; Cat Grant; Ron Troupe; Steve Lombard; Lana Lang

The Daily Planet is a fictional newspaper appearing in American comic books published by DC Comics, commonly in association with Superman. The newspaper was first mentioned in Action Comics #9 (November 13, 1939) – Underworld Politics, War on Crime. The Daily Planet building's distinguishing feature is the enormous globe that sits on top of the building.

Based in the fictional city of Metropolis, the paper employs Clark Kent, Lois Lane, Jimmy Olsen, and Perry White as its editor-in-chief. The building's original features were inspired by the Old Toronto Star Building where Superman's co-creator, Joe Shuster, was a newsboy when the Toronto Star was still called the Daily Star. Shuster has claimed that Metropolis was visually inspired by Toronto. Over the years, however, Metropolis has come to serve as an analogue to New York City.

== Fictional history ==
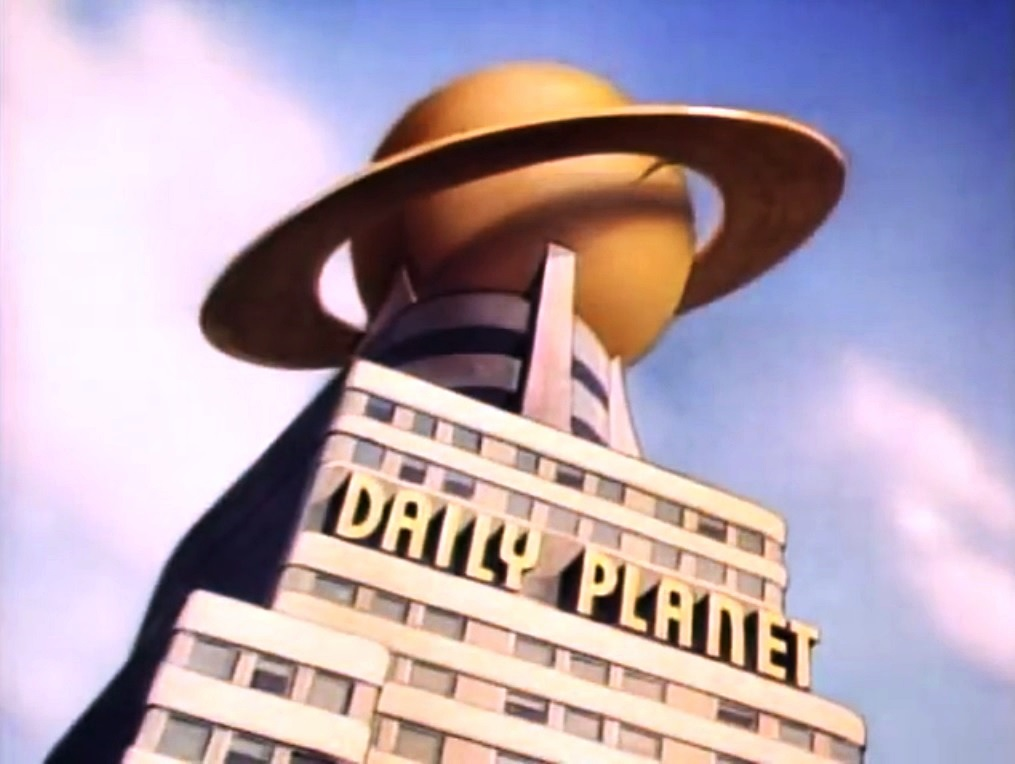
The Daily Planet building (1942)

=== Golden and Silver Age ===
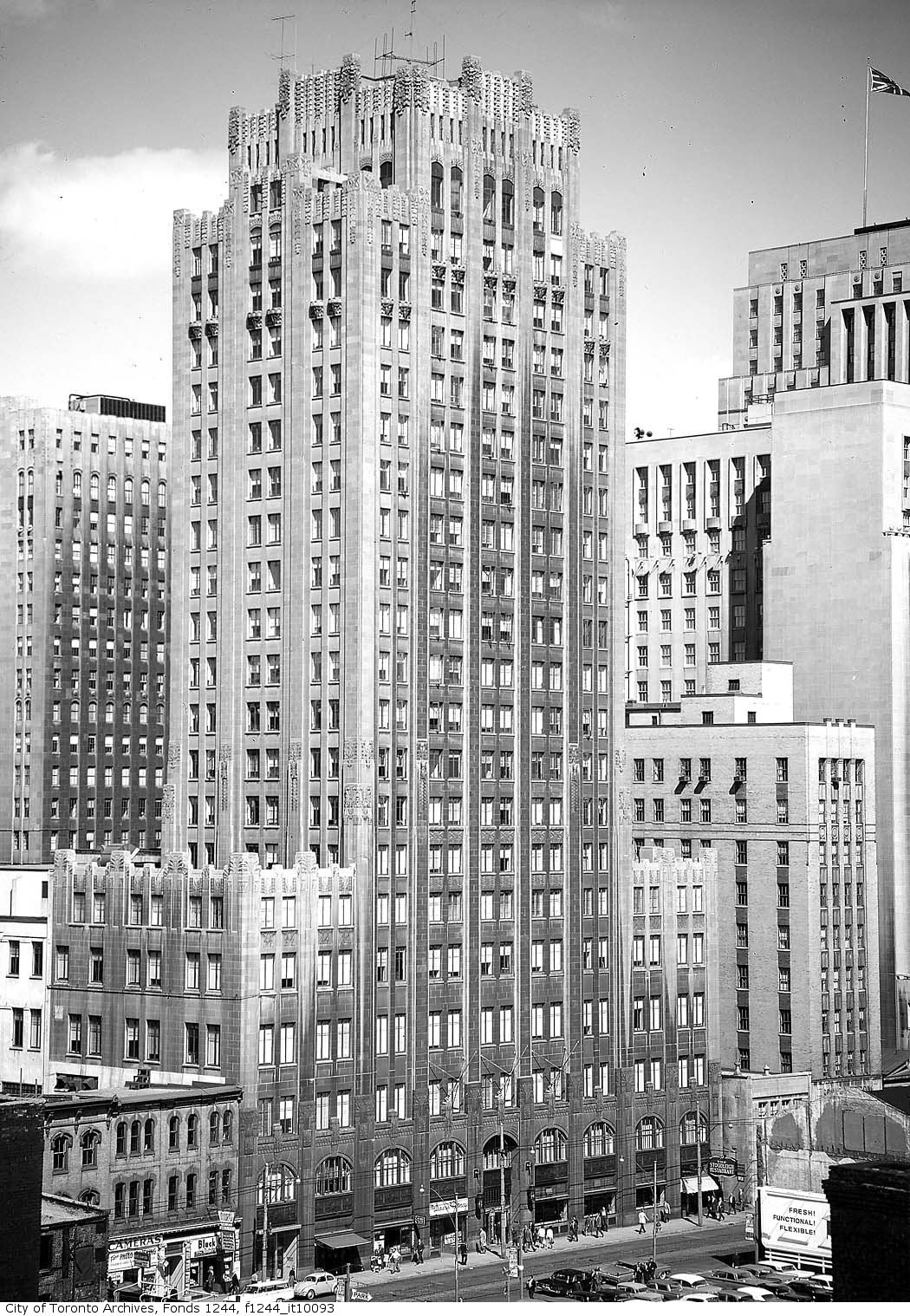
Old Toronto Star Building, demolished in 1972, was Shuster's model for the Daily Planet building.

The Daily Star logo

When Superman first appeared in comics (specifically 1938's Action Comics #1), his alter ego Clark Kent worked for a newspaper named the Daily Star, under editor George Taylor. Joe Shuster named the Daily Star after the Toronto Daily Star newspaper in Toronto, Ontario, which had been the newspaper that Shuster's parents received and for which Shuster had worked as a newsboy. It was not until later that the fictional paper became the Daily Planet. The real-world newspaper was called the Evening Star prior to 1899; the Toronto Daily Star is now known as the Toronto Star.

While choosing a name for the fictitious newspaper, consideration was given to combining the names of The Globe and Mail (another Toronto newspaper) and the Daily Star to become The Daily Globe. But when the comic strip appeared, the newspaper's name was permanently made the Daily Planet to avoid a name conflict with real newspapers. In Superman #5 (Summer 1940), the publisher of the Daily Planet is shown to be Burt Mason, a man who is determined to print the truth even when corrupt politician Alex Evell threatens him. In Superman #6 (September–October 1940), Mason gives free printing equipment to The Gateston Gazette after its editor, Jim Tirrell, is killed and its equipment is destroyed by racketeers that Tirrell insisted on reporting.

When DC made use of its multiverse means of continuity tracking between the early 1960s and mid-1980s, it was declared that the Daily Star was the newspaper's name in the Golden Age or "Earth-Two" versions of Clark Kent, Lois Lane and Jimmy Olsen, while the Daily Planet was used in the Silver Age or "Earth-One" versions. The Clark Kent of Earth-Two eventually became the editor-in-chief of the Daily Star, something his Earth-One counterpart did not achieve.

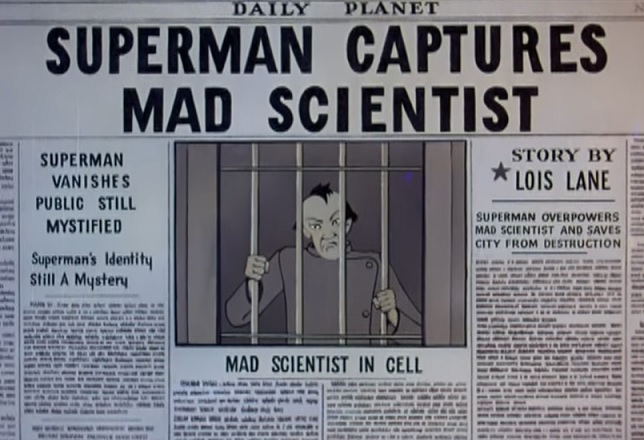
A Daily Planet headline (1941)

In the Silver and Bronze Age universes, Clark's first contact with the Daily Planet came when reporter (and future editor) Perry White came to Smallville to write a story about Superboy, and wound up getting an interview where the Boy of Steel first revealed his extraterrestrial origins. The story resulted in Perry earning a Pulitzer Prize. During Clark Kent's years in college, Perry White was promoted to editor-in-chief upon the retirement of the Daily Planet's previous editor, the Earth-One version of George Taylor.

After graduating from Metropolis University with a degree in journalism, Clark Kent went to work at the Planet, and quickly met Lois Lane (who had been working there for some time already). After Clark was hired, Jimmy Olsen joined the paper's staff.

In 1971, the Daily Planet was purchased by Morgan Edge, president of the Galaxy Broadcasting System. Edge proceeded to integrate Metropolis television station WGBS-TV's studios into the Daily Planet building, and named Clark Kent as the anchor for the WGBS evening news. Lana Lang, Clark's former schoolmate from Smallville, joins him as a co-anchor.

After the 1985–1986 miniseries Crisis on Infinite Earths, many of these elements, including Morgan Edge buying the Daily Planet, were retroactively changed or eliminated from the Superman canon.

=== Post-Crisis ===
In post-Crisis continuity, years before Clark or Lois began working for the paper, Lex Luthor owned the Daily Planet. When Luthor, deciding to sell the paper, began taking bids for the Planet, Perry White convinced an international conglomerate, TransNational Enterprises, to buy the paper. They agreed to this venture with only one stipulation: that White would become editor-in-chief. White had served as the Planet editor-in-chief ever since, barring the few times he was absent. During those times, people such as Sam Foswell and Clark Kent have looked after the paper. Franklin Stern, an old friend of White's, became the Daily Planet's publisher.

The Daily Planet building in Action Comics #1051 (January 2023). Art by Lee Weeks (pencils/inks) and Elizabeth Breitweiser (colors).

The Planet saw its share of rough times during White's tenure. For example, it had many violent worker strikes. The building itself, along with most of the city, was destroyed during the "Fall of Metropolis" storyline; it is only much later that it was restored by the efforts of various superheroes. The Planet building sustained heavy damages after the villain Doomsday's rampage. Later, Franklin Stern decided to put the paper up for sale. Lex Luthor, disliking the heavy criticism of himself and his company that the Planet became noted for, purchased the Daily Planet and subsequently closed the paper down. Luthor fired every employee of the newspaper except for four people: Simone D'Neige, Dirk Armstrong, Jimmy Olsen, and Lois Lane. As a final insult, Luthor saw to it that the Planet globe was unceremoniously dumped in the Metropolis landfill. In the Planet's place emerged LexCom. a news-oriented Internet website that primarily catered to Luthor's views of "quality journalism."

After Lois Lane made a deal with Luthor where, in exchange for him returning the Planet to Perry, she would kill one story of his choosing with no questions asked, Luthor sold the Daily Planet to Perry White for the token sum of one dollar. The paper was quickly reinstated, rehiring all of its old staff. Sometime later, ownership of the Planet fell into the hands of Bruce Wayne, where it has remained ever since. In the Batman: Hush storyline, it is named a subsidiary of Wayne Entertainment.

During the "Y2K" storyline (involving the city of Metropolis being infused with futuristic technology thanks to a descendant of the villain Brainiac), the Daily Planet building was "upgraded" along with the rest of Metropolis, and a holographic globe replaced the physical one. Eventually due to temporal instabilities caused by the B13 Virus, Metropolis and the Daily Planet building, globe and all, were restored to their former states.

In the current comics and media spinoffs, the Daily Planet is presented as a thoroughly modern news operation, including operating an Internet website much like most large newspapers. The Planet's reporters also have access to the best modern equipment to aid their work, though Perry White has often been shown as still favoring a manual typewriter. In 2008, it was said that Clark (at least in this era/continuity) uses a typewriter at his desk due to his powers causing minor interference in regular desktop computers.

During this era, the Planet's major competitors in Metropolis include the tabloid newspaper the Daily Star, WGBS-TV (which also employed Jimmy Olsen and Cat Grant for a time), and Lex Luthor's various media operations. A contemporary publication is Newstime Magazine, where Clark Kent worked as the editor for a time. The publisher of Newstime is Colin Thornton, who is secretly the demon Satanus, an enemy of Superman.

=== Superman: Birthright ===
In the Superman: Birthright limited series, the Daily Planet's publisher was Quentin Galloway, an abrasive overbearing loudmouth who bullied Jimmy Olsen, and later Clark Kent, before being told off by Lois Lane, whom Galloway could not fire because of her star status. This was meant to be a new origin for Superman but one that applied to the Post-Crisis continuity, so later Planet history concerning Luthor temporarily owning it and other events still applied.

=== Post-Infinite Crisis ===
During the story Infinite Crisis, parts of the post-Crisis history were altered. These changes were explained gradually over the next several years. The 2009 mini-series Superman: Secret Origin clarified the earlier history of the Planet in the new continuity. The story established that while Lex Luthor, in the revised history, owns every media in Metropolis and uses it to enforce his public image as a wealthy benefactor, the Planet had always stood free, refusing him ownership and even condemning his actions in editorials signed by Perry White himself. As a result, when Clark Kent is first inducted into the Planet, the newspaper was almost bankrupt, dilapidated and unable to afford new reporters. This changed after Superman begins his career. Thanks to Superman granting exclusive interviews and photographs to Lois Lane and Jimmy Olsen when he debuts, the paper's circulation increased 700%.

General Sam Lane (Lois' father) attempts to capture Superman, seeing him as an alien threat. When he failed to do so, he forcibly shut down the Planet as part of an attempt to force Perry White and Lois to turn over any information they had on Superman that they have not released to the public. Eventually, Superman turns the public to his favor and Sam Lane was seen in a bad light after his soldier John Corben, also known as Metallo, ruthlessly endangered civilians. These events lead to the people of Metropolis no longer looking at Lex Luthor as a savior and the Daily Planet becomes the city's top-selling paper, as well as a major player in media.

In Final Crisis #2, the villain Clayface triggers an explosion in the Daily Planet building, greatly damaging the offices, leaving many injured and at least one person dead. Lois Lane is hospitalized. Despite the chaos of Final Crisis and more than half of humanity being enslaved by evil, the newspaper continues to spread news and inform the public via a printing press in Superman's Fortress of Solitude. In Final Crisis #7, it is shown functioning once again.

=== The New 52 ===
The Daily Planet building as it appears in the New 52. Art from Superman (vol. 3) #1 (November 2011) by George Pérez and Jesús Merino.

With the reboot of DC's line of comics in 2011, the Daily Planet was shown in the Superman comics as being bought by Morgan Edge and merged with the Galaxy Broadcasting System, similar to the Silver/Bronze Age continuity. In Action Comics, it is revealed that in the new history/universe, Clark Kent begins his journalism career in Metropolis roughly six years before Galaxy Broadcasting merges with the Daily Planet. Along with being a writer for The Daily Star, partly because editor George Taylor was a friend of his adopted parents, Clark is an active blogger who speaks against political corruption and reports on the troubles of everyday citizens who are not often the focus of news media. While working at the Star, Clark meets Planet photographer Jimmy Olsen and the two become friends despite working at rival publications. Clark is also a great fan of Lois Lane's work at the Daily Planet, eventually meeting her through Jimmy. Months after Superman makes his public debut, Clark leaves The Daily Star on good terms and accepts a position at the Daily Planet.

After the merger with Galaxy Broadcasting, Lois was promoted to run the TV division, with Clark acting as an on-the-scene reporter for the TV division. Clark is later assigned the "Superman beat." But after rising tension between himself and Lois, as well as with Galaxy Broadcasting head Morgan Edge, Clark concludes that the Daily Planet is now more concerned with ratings and internet page views than actual journalism. He quits and goes off to begin an independent, internet news site with fellow journalist Cat Grant. Though Lois and Jimmy consider this to be a bad and risky decision, they continue to act as Clark's friends and confidants, offering aid when they can.

At the conclusion of the New 52, following the New 52 Superman's death, Lex Luthor buys the Daily Planet.

=== 30th and 31st centuries ===
In virtually every incarnation of the era inhabited by the Legion of Super-Heroes, the Daily Planet is depicted as a fixture in Metropolis, and one of Earth's major media sources. Frequently, the Flash's wife Iris West (a native of the era) is depicted as a member of its staff or editorial board.

== Fictional employees ==
The staff of the Daily Planet from Action Comics Annual #11 (July 2008). Art by Adam Kubert and Stéphane Roux.

Daily Planet's staff at various times included:

- Perry White - Editor-in-chief
- Clark Kent - Reporter
- Lois Lane - Reporter
- Jimmy Olsen - Photographer, cub reporter
- Lana Lang - Business columnist, editor
- Cat Grant - Gossip columnist, editor
- Ron Troupe - Political columnist, editor
- Steve Lombard - Sports columnist, editor

== In other media ==
=== Television ===
==== Live-action ====
- The Daily Planet appears in Adventures of Superman, with exterior shots represented by Los Angeles City Hall and the E. Clem Wilson Building.
- The Daily Planet, renamed the Daily Bugle (not to be confused with the Marvel Comics property of the same name), appears in The Adventures of Superpup.
- The Daily Planet appears in the first season of Lois and Clark: The New Adventures of Superman. This version of the building has a small globe near the entrance and a helipad in place of the large rooftop globe. At the end of the season, the Daily Planet is bought out and closed down before Metropolis businessman Franklin Stern funds a relaunch.
- The Daily Planet appears in Smallville. This version of the building is located across from LuthorCorp's corporate headquarters at 355 Burrard St., the address of the Marine Building where filming of the series took place.
- The Daily Planet appears in Superman & Lois.

==== Animation ====
- The Daily Planet appears in Super Friends.
- The Daily Planet appears in Superman (1988).
- The Daily Planet appears in Superman: The Animated Series. This version is stated to have offices in Gotham City.
  - The Daily Planet appears again in Justice League.
  - The Daily Planet appears again in Justice League Unlimited.
- The Daily Planet appears in The Batman episode "The Batman / Superman Story".
- The Daily Planet appears in Batman: The Brave and the Bold.
- The Daily Planet appears in Young Justice.
- The Daily Planet appears in Justice League Action.
- The Daily Planet appears in My Adventures with Superman.
- The Daily Planet appears in the fifth season of Harley Quinn.

=== Film ===
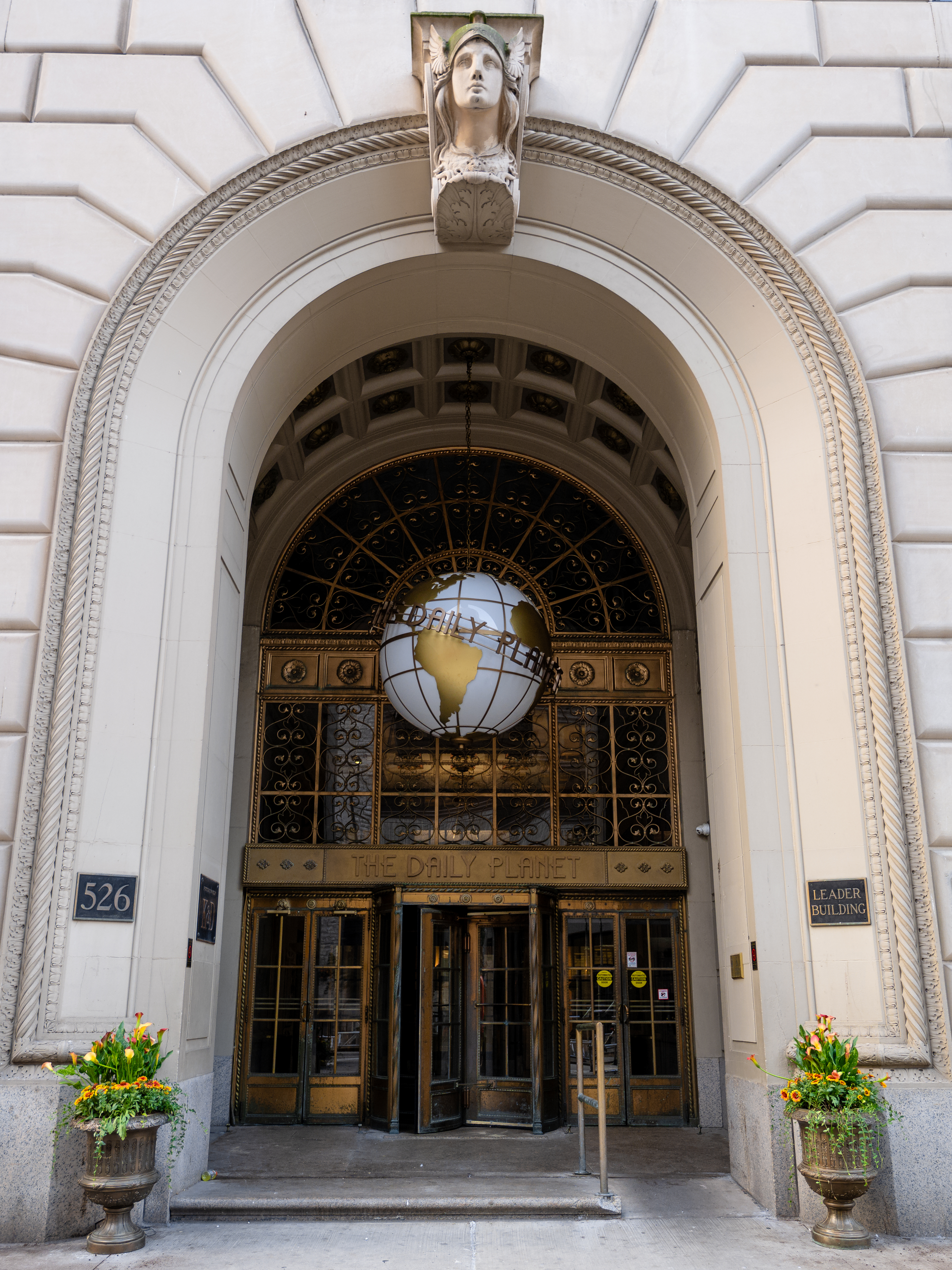
The Daily Planet building on the set of Superman in 2024

- The Daily Planet appears in Superman (1978), Superman II, Superman III, and Superman IV: The Quest for Peace. For all of its appearances, the exterior was represented by the New York Daily News building.
- The Daily Planet appears in Superman Returns as a computer generated image of a fictional building inserted into the New York City skyline.
- The Daily Planet appears in Superman: Doomsday.
- The Daily Planet makes a background appearance in Justice League: The New Frontier.
- The Daily Planet appears in Superman/Batman: Public Enemies and Superman/Batman: Apocalypse.
- The Daily Planet appears in All-Star Superman.
- The Daily Planet building appears in Justice League: Doom.
- The Daily Planet appears in Superman vs. The Elite.
- The Daily Planet appears in Superman Unbound.
- The Daily Planet appears in films set in the DC Extended Universe (DCEU), with exterior shots being represented by the Chicago Board of Trade Building while interior shots were filmed inside Willis Tower.
- The Daily Planet makes a background appearance in Justice League: War.
- A parallel universe variant of the Daily Planet called PLANETNWZ.COM appears in Justice League: Gods and Monsters.
- The Daily Planet appears in Superman: Man of Tomorrow.
- The Daily Planet's globe appears in Space Jam: A New Legacy.
- The Daily Planet appears in DC League of Super-Pets.
- The Daily Planet appears in Superman (2025).

=== Video games ===
- The Daily Planet appears in Superman: Shadow of Apokolips.
- The Daily Planet appears as a stage in Mortal Kombat vs. DC Universe.
- The Daily Planet appears in DC Universe Online. This version was located in downtown Metropolis before it was bottled by Brainiac.
- The Daily Planet appears in Batman Arkham Knight.
- The Daily Planet appears in Lego Dimensions.
- The Daily Planet appears in Suicide Squad: Kill the Justice League.

=== Miscellaneous ===
- The Daily Planet appeared in promotional pages for regular DC publications from 1976 to 1981. Notable features of the page were "The Answer Man", where DC writer/editor Bob Rozakis would answer questions sent in by readers, and a comic strip by cartoonist Fred Hembeck poking fun at DC characters.
- A 16-page "Special Invasion Edition" of the Daily Planet was published by DC in November 1988 as a tie-in to the Invasion! crossover event.
- The Daily Planet received a self-titled song in Mark Hollis' self-titled debut album.
