= All-Star Superman (film) =

2011 direct-to-video animated superhero film directed by Sam Liu

- DVD cover
- Directed by: Sam Liu
- Written by: Dwayne McDuffie
- Based on: All-Star Superman by: Grant Morrison; Frank Quitely
- Produced by: Bruce Timm; Alan Burnett; Sam Register
- Starring: James Denton; Christina Hendricks; Anthony LaPaglia
- Music by: Christopher Drake
- Production companies: Warner Premiere; DC Entertainment; Warner Bros. Animation
- Distributed by: Warner Home Video
- Release date: February 22, 2011
- Running time: 78 minutes
- Country: United States
- Language: English

All-Star Superman is a 2011 American animated superhero film based on the comic book series of the same name by Grant Morrison and Frank Quitely. Released direct-to-video by Warner Bros. Animation on February 22, 2011, it is the tenth film of the DC Universe Animated Original Movies.

It is the first film in the series to not receive a PG-13 rating from the Motion Picture Association, instead being rated PG for "sequences of action and violence, language including brief innuendo, and some sensuality". All-Star Superman is also one of the final projects by writer Dwayne McDuffie, and was released the day after his death.

== Plot ==
Dr. Leo Quintum and his team are exploring the Sun when they are sabotaged by a booby-trapped genetically-enhanced time-bomb clone made by Lex Luthor. Superman stops the clone but in doing so receives an overdose of solar radiation; it has given him increased powers, but is slowly killing him. Luthor is arrested thanks to Clark Kent's article and sentenced to death. When Clark visits Luthor, Clark's energy frees Parasite who Luthor kills in self-defense. He then sneaks Clark out of Stryker's Island with help from his niece Nasthalthia.

Wanting to spend as much time as possible with Lois Lane, Superman reveals to her that he is Clark Kent, and takes her to the Fortress of Solitude. During this visit, Superman's secretive behavior and her indirect exposure to alien chemicals heightens Lois' paranoia. Superman is able to calm her, explaining his caginess was to hide her birthday present, a serum granting her superpowers for 24 hours.

After having Kandor grown on another planet, Superman encounters the Kryptonian astronauts Bar-El and Lilo who have improved Earth's technology. During Superman's scuffle with them, Bar-El and Lilo come down with a Kryptonite illness because the path they followed to Earth had residue of Kryptonite. At their suggestion, Superman projects Bar-El and Lilo into the Phantom Zone until a cure can be found.

Unbeknownst to anyone, Luthor reprogrammed one of the Fortress' robots to steal the serum Superman made for Lois' birthday. Luthor gains Superman's powers, enabling him to survive execution by electric chair. Superman learns that Luthor's secret ally Solaris has betrayed him by turning Earth's sun blue. With his robots, Superman engages Solaris in space. Superman's pet Sun-Eater sacrifices itself to weaken Solaris, which allows Superman to destroy it.

Clark returns to the Daily Planet, very ill, and collapses upon completing his article, "SUPERMAN DEAD". When the staff tries to save him, they realize that he has stopped breathing and his heart has stopped. Luthor arrives with Nasthalthia and attempts to kill Lois. Clark revives and fires a gravity gun at Luthor. As his powers fade, Luthor briefly sees the world as Superman does and weeps as he gains a measure of understanding. Luthor wishes the experience to continue, but when he reaches for his next vial of serum, he realizes that Superman has stolen his supply. Superman destroys the serum over Luthor's protests, pointing out that if Luthor truly cared about solving the world's problems, he would have done so long ago. Luthor somberly admits Superman is right.

With Superman's body starting to turn into pure energy, he proclaims his love for Lois and gives her his cape as a way to remember him before he leaves and flies into the sun, seemingly sacrificing himself to save the Earth.

Quintum visits Luthor in his cell. Now enlightened from his ordeal and accepting his impending death, Luthor presents Quintum with the only thing that could redeem him for his actions: a formula to recreate Superman's genetic structure through a healthy human ovum. Inside the Sun, Superman, now a solar being, is activating and making machinery within.

== Cast ==
- James Denton as Kal-El / Clark Kent / Superman
- Christina Hendricks as Lois Lane / Superwoman
- Anthony LaPaglia as Lex Luthor
- Edward Asner as Perry White
- Frances Conroy as Martha Kent
- Linda Cardellini as Nasthalthia
- Cathy Cavadini as Floral
- Steve Blum as Atlas
- Obba Babatundé as Judge, Bibliobot
- Chris Cox as Lead Agent
- Alexis Denisof as Dr. Leo Quintum
- John DiMaggio as Samson
- Robin Atkin Downes as Solaris
- Michael Gough as Parasite
- Matthew Gray Gubler as Jimmy Olsen
- Finola Hughes as Lilo
- Kevin Michael Richardson as Steve Lombard
- Fred Tatasciore as Krull
- Arnold Vosloo as Bar-El

== Reception ==
The film was well received by critics. Based on five reviews collected on Rotten Tomatoes, the film has an approval rating of 80% based on 5 reviews, with an average rating of 7.0/10.

IGN gave the Blu-ray release a score of 7 out of 10, praising the visuals but stating that "there are too many threads, too many characters and too many detours down paths that don't amount to much in the end." ComicsAlliance criticized some of the changes made in the adaptation, specifically those which involve Superman killing or allowing others to die, but concluded by calling the film "a highly enjoyable picture, and one of DC's best offerings.

The film earned $4,701,620 from domestic DVD sales and $2,474,410 from domestic Blu-ray sales, bringing its total domestic home video earnings to $7,176,030.

== Home media ==
The film comes in both DVD and Blu-ray and includes the Superman: The Animated Series episode "Blasts From the Past" and a preview of the next DC Universe Animated Original Movie, Green Lantern: Emerald Knights.
