= Perry White =

Fictional character in DC Comics

- Perry White as depicted in The World of Metropolis #1 (August 1988). Art by John Byrne, Dick Giordano, and Tom Ziuko.

Publication information
- Publisher: DC Comics
- First appearance: The Adventures of Superman "Clark Kent, Reporter (February 14, 1940)"
- First comic appearance: Superman #7 (November 1940)
- Created by: George Putnam Ludlam (radio); Jerry Siegel and Wayne Boring (comics)

In-story information
- Team affiliations: Daily Planet; Galaxy Communications
- Supporting character of: Superman; Lois Lane; Jimmy Olsen

Perry White is a fictional character appearing in American comic books published by DC Comics. He is the editor-in-chief of the Metropolis newspaper the Daily Planet. The character is usually portrayed as maintaining high ethical and strict journalistic standards, and is an archetypal image of the tough, irascible, but fair-minded boss.

In film, the character has been portrayed by Pierre Watkin in the Superman serial, Jackie Cooper in Superman (1978) and its sequels, Frank Langella in Superman Returns, Laurence Fishburne in the DC Extended Universe, and Wendell Pierce in the DC Universe (DCU) film Superman (2025). In television, John Hamilton and Lane Smith played the character in Adventures of Superman and Lois & Clark: The New Adventures of Superman, respectively, Michael McKean in Smallville, and Paul Jarrett in the series Superman & Lois.

== Publication history ==
The character Perry White was created for the radio serial The Adventures of Superman, voiced by actor Julian Noa. He first appeared in the second episode, "Clark Kent, Reporter", which aired on February 14, 1940. The character was introduced into the comic books later that year, appearing in Superman #7 (November 1940). Since then, the character has continued to appear in Superman and other comic books on a continual basis, and has been a regular supporting character in both live-action and animated films and television programs over eight decades.

He frequently exclaims, "Great Caesar's ghost!" and "Don't call me chief!".

== Fictional character biography ==
=== Golden and Silver Age ===
The earliest Superman comics depict Clark Kent and Lois Lane working for the newspaper the Daily Star under editor George Taylor. However, after Perry White's introduction in the Adventures of Superman radio series, the character was incorporated into the comic books, appearing as the editor of a newly renamed the Daily Planet. No in-story explanation for this change was given at the time, and Taylor and the Daily Star are not mentioned again for many years.

Following the introduction of the multiverse, Taylor and the Daily Star are retroactively placed on Earth-Two, while White and the Daily Planet are placed on Earth-One. Additionally, White is established as having an Earth-Two counterpart who is a reporter for the Daily Star.

Prior to the continuity changes detailed in Crisis on Infinite Earths, The Man of Steel, and other comics published after 1986, Perry White is depicted as a freelance reporter for various newspapers, including a Chicago newspaper and Gotham City's Gotham Gazette. In The Adventures of Superman, it was also established that White had a law degree but had never practiced law.

White eventually goes to work at the Daily Planet as a reporter and earns his first Pulitzer Prize following an interview with Superboy.

Later, Perry's reporting skills earn further praise after he is the first to discover that Superboy has moved to Metropolis from Smallville. (Superboy had intended to keep his move quiet for an undefined period of time, so as not to alert anyone to Superboy and Clark Kent leaving Smallville at the same time.)

Finally, during Clark Kent's junior year of college, White becomes editor-in-chief following George Taylor's retirement.

In the early 1970s, Morgan Edge buys the Daily Planet, taking most of White's position.

=== Post-Crisis (1986–2011) ===
With writer John Byrne's post-Crisis on Infinite Earths revamp of Superman's origin in the Man of Steel miniseries and his subsequent Superman comics, Perry White's history was altered and fleshed out more fully.

Post-Crisis, White was born in Metropolis' Suicide Slum area, growing up with a father missing in action in an overseas war. White attends school with Lex Luthor and begins his career as a copy boy at the Daily Planet.

After Luthor becomes a successful businessman, he diversifies his holdings in LexCorp and temporarily buys the Daily Planet. Turning down an offer from Luthor to become part of Luthor's new television station WLEX, White finds an investor who saves the Daily Planet on the condition that White becomes managing editor. The incident leaves White bitter and angry with Luthor.

White marries Alice Spencer and has a son, Jerry White. Much later, after Jerry is fully grown, Perry learns that Luthor is Jerry's biological father. Although Perry continues to raise Jerry as his own, the knowledge that he is not the boy's true father continues to haunt him.

In subsequent years as managing editor and then editor-in-chief of The Daily Planet, White forms a core team of reporters and writers: Lois Lane, Clark Kent, Jimmy Olsen, Cat Grant, Ron Troupe, Steve Lombard, and many others. The Planet, meanwhile, is established as a paper of record, breaking such stories as Superman's debut, multiple alien invasions, and the death and subsequent return of Superman. During this time, White becomes increasingly estranged from Jerry, who later dies from a gunshot wound. Perry and Alice grieve for some time, resulting in Perry taking a leave of absence from the Daily Planet.

Later, the Whites adopt an orphaned African-American boy named Keith Parks, who soon has his name changed to Keith White. During this time, Perry takes another leave of absence for cancer treatment, putting Clark Kent in charge as the Planet's temporary editor.

During a period of financial struggle for the Planet, its owner, Franklin Stern, sells the paper back to Luthor. Luthor, acting out of malice, shuts the paper down and fires everyone except Lane, Olsen, and two others who are forced to accept new jobs at Lexcom, Luthor's new Internet-based news company. Shortly thereafter, Luthor sells the Planet to Bruce Wayne for one dollar. Wayne rehires White and gives him full control of the Planet, enabling him to undo Luthor's meddling and resolve the company's financial problems.

=== New 52 ===
When Superman's identity is exposed by Lois to protect Clark from being blackmailed by a secret conspiracy, White fires Clark in a fury of anger and perceived betrayal, accusing Clark of only working at the Planet so that he can profit from his own headlines.

When the Superman of this reality dies, he is replaced by his predecessor from the pre-Flashpoint universe, while Mister Mxyzptlk uses his powers to impersonate Clark Kent and convince everyone that the previous revelation of Superman's identity was an elaborate hoax. This storyline culminates in the displaced Lois and Clark merging with their counterparts in this universe, creating a new timeline where Lois and Clark leave the Planet to raise their newborn son Jon Kent.

When Lex Luthor and Manchester Black erase all public knowledge of Superman's secret identity, White is the first to demonstrate what will happen if anyone is reminded of this secret. Black's telepathic command nearly causes White to have a seizure as his brain can no longer accept the idea that Superman and Clark Kent are the same person. Some time later, White is elected mayor of Metropolis.

== Other versions ==
- An alternate universe version of Perry White appears in All-Star Superman, in which he helps contribute to exposing Lex Luthor's crimes.
- An alternate universe version of Perry White makes a cameo appearance in Superman: Red Son, in which he retires as the Daily Planet's editor-in-chief and appoints Lois Luthor his successor.

== In other media ==
=== Television ===
==== Live-action ====
- Perry White appears in Adventures of Superman, portrayed by John Hamilton. This version has a sister, Kate, and a nephew, Chris. Additionally, the series originated the character's catchphrases "Great Caesar's ghost!" and "Don't call me chief".
- Perry White's son, Trevor Jenkins "T.J." White, appears in the first season of Superboy (1988), portrayed by Jim Calvert.
- Perry White appears in Lois & Clark: The New Adventures of Superman, portrayed by Lane Smith. This version is a Baby boomer with an abiding fondness for rock and roll, particularly Elvis Presley, and is known for exclaiming "Great shades of Elvis!" as such. Additionally, he displays marital difficulties with his wife Alice.
- Perry White appears in Smallville, portrayed by Michael McKean. This version is a multiple Pulitzer-nominated tabloid television reporter who previously worked for the Daily Planet before he mounted a failed attempt at exposing Lionel Luthor's corruption. Later in the series, he enters a relationship with Senator Martha Kent and eventually becomes editor-in-chief of the Daily Planet.
- Perry White appears in the pilot episode of Superman & Lois, portrayed by Paul Jarrett. This version lost his position as editor-in-chief of the Daily Planet after Morgan Edge bought out the company and replaced him with Samuel Foswell.

==== Animation ====
- Perry White appears in The New Adventures of Superman, voiced by Jackson Beck.
- Perry White appears in Super Friends, voiced by William Woodson.
- Perry White appears in Superman (1988), voiced by Stanley Ralph Ross.
- Perry White appears in series set in the DC Animated Universe (DCAU):
  - White first appears in Superman: The Animated Series, voiced by George Dzundza.
  - White makes non-speaking cameo appearances in Justice League and Justice League Unlimited.
- Perry White appears in the Batman: The Brave and the Bold episode "Battle of the Superheroes!", voiced by Richard McGonagle.
- Perry White appears in the Justice League Action episode "Superman's Pal, Sid Sharp", voiced by Piotr Michael.
- Perry White appears in My Adventures with Superman, voiced by Darrell Brown. This version is an old college friend of Vicki Vale and is depicted as African-American, similarly to the DCEU incarnation (see below).
- Perry White appears in the fifth season of Harley Quinn, voiced by Alan Tudyk.

=== Film ===
==== Live-action ====
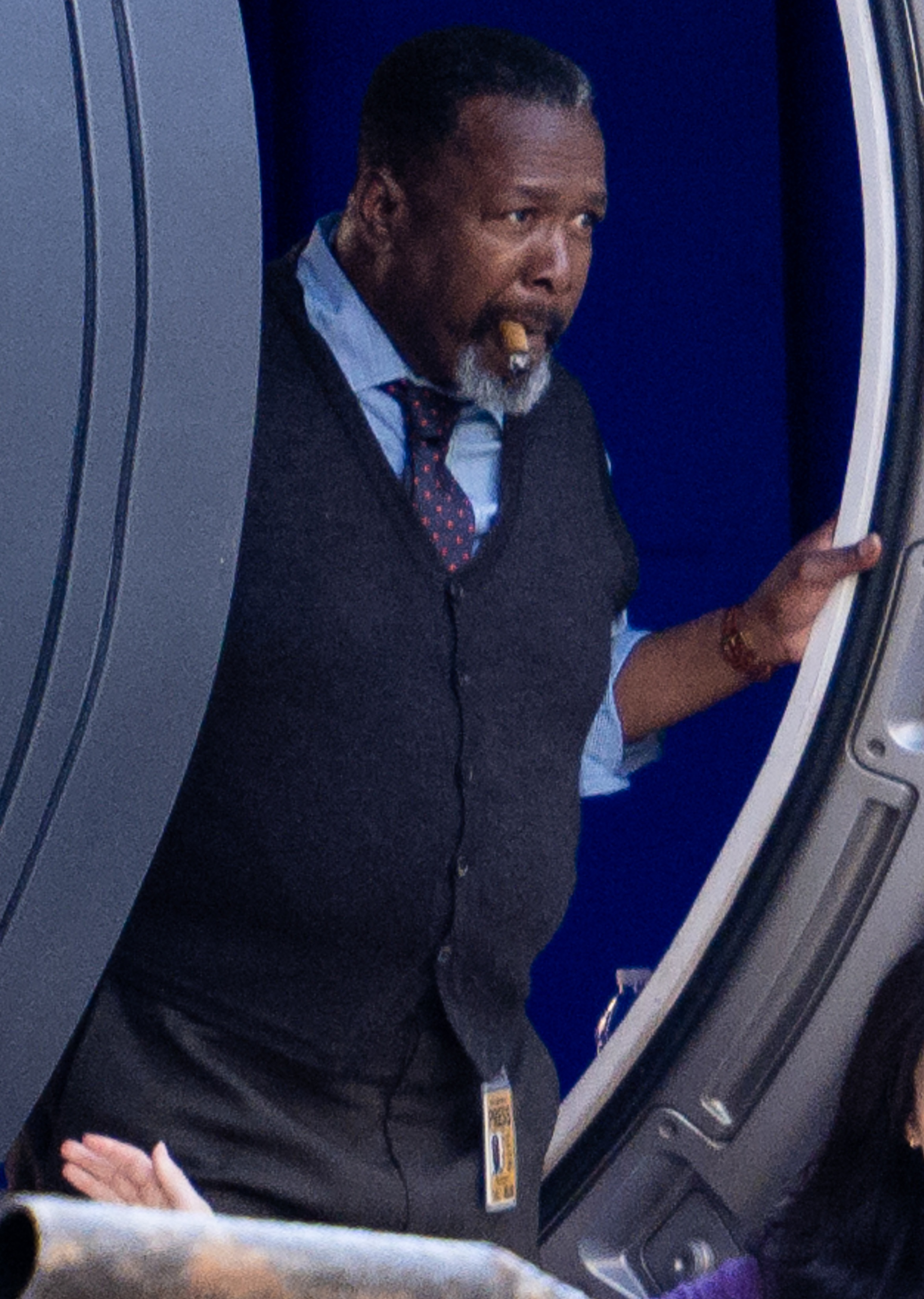
Wendell Pierce as White in the 2025 film Superman

- Perry White appears in Superman (1948), portrayed by Pierre Watkin.
- Perry White appears in Atom Man vs. Superman (1950), portrayed again by Pierre Watkin.
- Perry White appears in Superman (1978), Superman II, Superman II: The Richard Donner Cut, Superman III, and Superman IV: The Quest for Peace, portrayed by Jackie Cooper. This version is a tough individual who constantly reminds his employees that he has worked for the Daily Planet for most of his life and is fond of aphorisms. In the commentary track for Superman (1978), director Richard Donner reveals that Cooper got the role because he had a passport and was able to be on set within hours after Keenan Wynn, who was originally cast, suffered a heart attack.
- Perry White appears in Superman Returns, portrayed by Frank Langella. Prior to Langella's casting, Hugh Laurie was originally set to portray White until a scheduling conflict with House arose and Laurie was forced to drop out. This version has a nephew, Richard, who is engaged to Lois Lane and serves as a father figure to her son Jason.
- Perry White appears in the DC Extended Universe (DCEU) films Man of Steel and Batman v Superman: Dawn of Justice, portrayed by Laurence Fishburne.
- Perry White appears in Superman (2025), portrayed by Wendell Pierce.

==== Animation ====
- Perry White appears in Superman: Brainiac Attacks, voiced again by George Dzundza.
- Perry White appears in Superman: Doomsday, voiced by Ray Wise. This version is bald.
- Perry White appears in All-Star Superman, voiced by Ed Asner.
- Perry White appears in Superman vs. The Elite, voiced by Fred Tatasciore.
- Perry White appears in Superman: Unbound, voiced by Wade Williams.
- Perry White appears in the DC Animated Movie Universe (DCAMU) films The Death of Superman and Reign of the Supermen, voiced by Rocky Carroll.
- Perry White appears in Lego DC Shazam! Magic and Monsters, voiced by Tom Kenny.
- Perry White appears in Superman: Man of Tomorrow, voiced again by Piotr Michael.
- Perry White makes a non-speaking cameo appearance in Injustice.
- Perry White appears in Scooby-Doo! and Krypto, Too!, voiced again by Fred Tatasciore.

=== Video games ===
- Perry White appears in Superman (1987).
- Perry White appears in Superman: Shadow of Apokolips, voiced again by George Dzundza.
- Perry White appears as a character summon in Scribblenauts Unmasked: A DC Comics Adventure.
- Perry White appears in Lego Dimensions, voiced by Brian Bloom.
- Perry White appears as an NPC in Lego DC Super-Villains, voiced again by Fred Tatasciore.

=== Miscellaneous ===
- Perry White appears in the second issue of the Superboy (1988) tie-in comic.
- Perry White appears in It's a Bird... It's a Plane... It's Superman, portrayed by Allen Ludden.
- Perry White appears in DC Universe Online: Legends. After being exposed to Brainiac's Exobytes, he becomes a cryokinetic metahuman and takes the name Frost.
- Perry White appears in the Young Justice tie-in comic.
