= Lois & Clark: The New Adventures of Superman season 2 =

Season of television series

Lois & Clark: The New Adventures of Superman
- Season 2
- DVD cover
- No. of episodes: 22

Release
- Original network: ABC
- Original release: September 18, 1994 – May 21, 1995

Season chronology
- ← Previous; Season 1 Next → Season 3

The second season of Lois & Clark: The New Adventures of Superman originally aired between September 18, 1994, and May 21, 1995, beginning with "Madame Ex".

The series loosely follows the philosophy of writer John Byrne, with Clark Kent as the true personality and Superman as a secondary disguise. As the show's title suggests, it focuses as much on the relationship between Clark Kent and Lois Lane as on the adventures of Clark's alter-ego. The central characters in season 2 are Dean Cain as Clark Kent/Superman, Teri Hatcher as Lois Lane, Lane Smith as Perry White, Eddie Jones as Jonathan Kent, K Callan as Martha Kent, and Justin Whalin as Jimmy Olsen.

Season two dropped the character of Cat Grant and replaced Michael Landes with Justin Whalin as Jimmy Olsen. The official reason, according to Landes, was that he looked too similar to Dean Cain (on the DVD commentary for the pilot of Lois & Clark, Cain has admitted that he and Landes looked like they could be related). Series creator Deborah Joy LeVine and the entire first-season writing team were also dismissed. The new producer, Robert Singer, planned a stronger focus on "action"; the show also focused more on the budding romance of Lois and Clark.

Lex Luthor returned in one episode and many other villains began to appear from the comics, such as The Prankster, Metallo, Toyman, and the criminal group known as Intergang, and the show featured new love interests for the ace reporters: Dan Scardino played by Jim Pirri, a government agent interested in Lois, and D. A. Mayson Drake played by Farrah Forke. This season also featured the debut of fan-favorite villain Tempus played by Lane Davies and H. G. Wells, as a time-traveler. Wells' younger self was played by Terry Kiser, and the older Wells was played by Hamilton Camp. Season two started out rocky but became a success and garnered higher ratings in its initial airings, ending the season in 58th place. The season ended with the cliffhanger of Clark proposing marriage to Lois.

== Episodes ==
| No. overall | No. in season | Title | Directed by | Written by | Original release date | Prod. code | U.S. viewers (millions) |
|---|---|---|---|---|---|---|---|
| 23 | 1 | "Madame Ex" | Randall Zisk | Tony Blake & Paul Jackson | September 18, 1994 | 456451 | 16.1 |
Dr. Arianna Carlin (Emma Samms), Lex Luthor's psychologist ex-wife arrives in Metropolis seeking revenge for his death and her targets are Lois and Superman. With the help of Dr. Heller (Earl Boen), a plastic surgeon who worked for Lex, she creates a duplicate of Lois, and kills Heller to cover it up. Carlin, using subliminal messaging in her books and media appearances to get the public to turn against Superman. The duplicate of Lois publicly accuses Superman of killing Lex and throws a tear gas in the newsroom of Daily Planet, to make everyone believe that Lois has gone insane as a result of stress from her failed wedding to Luthor. At the same time, Carlin is hired by Perry on the Daily Planet as a therapist and uses her position to convince everyone that Lois has gone insane. Clark decides to help Lois investigate the truth even though he is not sure if he believes her when she says that she is fine. Eventually, they discover the true identity of Arianna as Lex's ex-wife and they reveal the truth but not before Arianna captures Lois and attempts to kill Superman using kryptonite-laced bullets, while making it look like Lois did it. Lois takes the bullet out of Superman and he makes sure that Arianna and the Lois duplicate get arrested. Dr. Gretchen Kelly (Denise Crosby), who is taking care of Lex's body, previously stolen from the authorities, tells him that Arianna failed but he will always have her.
| 24 | 2 | "Wall of Sound" | Alan J. Levi | John McNamara | September 25, 1994 | 456452 | 16.8 |
The nominations for the Kerth Awards are about to be announced and Lois is sure that she will be nominated again since she has been every time for the last three years and won. When Clark is nominated instead of her, she becomes jealous and insecure, something that affects their investigation about a new villain in town who uses sound waves as a weapon. The sound wave puts people to sleep while he is able to rob banks and jewelry stores. Lois and Clark disagree on who the suspect might be, since Lois believes it is Lenny Stoke (Michael Des Barres) while Clark believes it is Dr. Derek Camden (Scott Colomby). The truth is somewhere in between since Stoke used Camden's knowledge to create the device for the sound waves, a device that can also produce a sound that affects Superman, something that makes it difficult for Superman to stop him. Eventually, Superman stops Stoke and sends him to prison, while Clark wins the Kerth Award. Lois is proud of her partner but she also warns him that the next time he forces her to be his date on a night where he gets awarded she will tear him apart, making both of them laugh.
| 25 | 3 | "The Source" | John T. Kretchmer | Tony Blake & Paul Jackson | October 2, 1994 | 456453 | 17.1 |
After an accident on a ferris wheel, a corporate whistleblower named Stuart Hofferman (Peter Scolari) comes to Lois stating that since he had previously warned management about the problem on the wheel but they ignored him. Lois writes the story and does everything she can to protect her source, even after Eric Thorp (Tim Grimm), the CEO of Stuart's company, tries to kill her and forces Stuart to say that he was lying. Perry is forced to kill the story while Stuart, who has been hiding at Clark's place, disappears. The disappearance looks like Stuart has been murdered and Lois is suspended since the murder was a result of Stuart providing her information. Clark helps Lois to restore her reputation and they discover that Stuart is not dead but he staged his death with the help of his best friend Oliver (Jeff Joseph), so people would leave him alone. They find him and convince him to help them expose the truth. Thorp is arrested and Lois returns to the Daily Planet, having restored her reputation.
| 26 | 4 | "The Prankster" | James Hayman | Grant Rosenberg | October 9, 1994 | 456454 | 16.1 |
A "secret admirer" starts sending Lois booby trapped gifts, with increasingly disruptive and violent results. After some investigation, Lois and Clark discover that her "admirer" is an ex-con, Kyle Griffin (Bronson Pinchot), who Lois helped send to prison five years earlier. Griffin, who is also known as the Prankster, is now out of jail and is seeking revenge. Using those pranks, he can get revenge on Lois while simultaneously he using the distraction provided by the pranks to commit robberies. Lois and Clark manage to finally spot him and with the help of Superman, they have him arrested.
| 27 | 5 | "Church of Metropolis" | Robert Singer | John McNamara | October 23, 1994 | 456455 | 18.2 |
Lois and Clark visit her Uncle Mike's (Dick Miller) restaurant in South Metropolis. While they are there, someone tries to set a fire in the restaurant, and Superman arrests the man. Lois and Clark begin investigating the case and they discover that a new criminal organization called Intergang is buying property in South Metropolis at very low prices. Superman tries to help but after an encounter with Martin Snell (Bruce Weitz), the lawyer of Intergang, he is unable to do anything because of their threats against everyone he loves. He still finds a way to help when Lois gives him the idea to be in South Metropolis undercover, so Intergang will not know that Superman is there. In the meantime, Mayson Drake (Farrah Forke), the prosecuting attorney assigned to the case, shows romantic interest in Clark but is suspicious of Superman. This interest makes Lois jealous of her and she tries to keep Clark away from her, especially when Lois discovers that Mayson's ex boss is Bill Church (Peter Boyle), a man who she believes is the leader of Intergang but she has no proof. Eventually, Lois and Clark work with Mayson and they manage to get Snell arrested but the moment he is ready to reveal who is the leader of Intergang, Church blows up the room killing him.
| 28 | 6 | "Operation Blackout" | Michael W. Watkins | Kate Boutilier | October 30, 1994 | 456456 | 15.6 |
During the demonstration of the US army's latest weapon, something seems to go wrong and General Marshall (Tom Hatten) is killed. Lois and Clark investigate the "accident" and discover that an old college friend of Lois named Ryan Wiley (Charles Rocket), who supposedly died a year ago, was present at the demonstration. Lois visits Molly (Melora Hardin), her friend from college and the ex-girlfriend of Ryan, to ask her about him. Molly is very different as a person now and she is against everything that has to do with technology. When she is asked about Ryan, she insists that all she knows is that he is dead. In the meantime, a citywide blackout forces the Daily Planet to find a means to publish the paper without the help of modern technology. Lois and Clark discover that Ryan's plan is to high-jack a satellite and blow up an army base. They get to the base where they split up. Lois finds the base's real security guards inside of a supply closet, all bound and gagged. Lois realizes that the guards were also fooled by Ryan. With Superman's help, they stop the satellite and Ryan, along with Colonel Fane (J. T. Walsh) who was also part of the plan, get arrested while trying to escape.
| 29 | 7 | "That Old Gang of Mine" | Lorraine Senna Ferrara | Gene Miller & Karen Kavnar | November 13, 1994 | 456457 | 19.8 |
Perry and Jimmy get car-jacked by Bonnie and Clyde (Amy Hathaway and Joseph Gian) and they all believe that the people who did it were just impersonating the two robbers. When John Dillinger (Robert Clohessy) and Al Capone (William Devane) also appear in Metropolis, things get even more weird and Lois and Clark discover that a scientist named Professor Emil Hamilton (John Pleshette) cloned the criminals because he believed he could alter people's personalities. Hamilton is not able to control the criminals anymore, who try to take over Metropolis, and Capone also forces him to recreate his old gang. Lois and Clark go to a club to find out more about the criminals and during a confrontation there, Clyde shoots Clark who has to fake his death so his Superman identity will not be revealed. While everyone mourns the loss of Clark, Lois manages to track down Hamilton and confirm his role in the criminals' resurrection, but she and Hamilton are nearly killed in a gang-style execution before Superman finds and saves them. Having learned about Hamilton's research, Clark then 'returns' and explains that Superman was able to preserve his body until he could use Hamilton's machine to bring him back. The criminals attack Daily Planet but Superman gets there in time and stops them while the police arrest them, followed by Clark revealing his 'resurrection' to everyone else. Overjoyed at his return, Lois decides to tell Clark her real feelings about him, only to realize that while she was talking Clark fell asleep and did not hear anything of what she had said.
| 30 | 8 | "A Bolt From the Blue" | Philip Sgriccia | Kathy McCormick | November 20, 1994 | 456458 | 20.3 |
Lois gets some info about Lex being alive and kept in a cemetery and wants to check it with Clark. At the cemetery, a man named William Wallace Webster Waldecker (Leslie Jordan) tries to commit suicide and Superman stops him. The moment he catches his hand, a lightning bolt strikes him and his powers are copied to Wallace. Dr. Gretchen Kelly (Denise Crosby) who keeps Lex's body, witnesses the power exchange and wants to get Superman's powers for herself. Wallace starts calling himself "The Resplendant Man" and starts saving people but he charges them for it. Superman tries to talk to him and explain that charging is not how a super hero works but Wallace refuses to listen, while at the same time tries to hide from Lois how Wallace got his powers because then everyone will want to get those powers. In the meantime, Gretchen kidnaps Wallace's sister, Wandamae (Cindy Williams) (and Lois for following and finding where she is hiding) to force Wallace into helping her get Superman's powers. Superman arrives and even though Kelly gets his powers from Wallace, Superman manages to use the stimulation and return the powers from both, Wallace and Gretchen, to him. Lois writes the story but skips the part of how the powers of Superman were copied while Gretchen dressed as a coroner, manages to get Lex's body back from the police when everyone believes he is dead.
| 31 | 9 | "Season's Greedings" | Randall Zisk | Dean Cain | December 4, 1994 | 456459 | 19.0 |
The toymaker Winslow P. Schott (Sherman Hemsley) gets fired from his job along with his secretary Margaret Duffy (Isabel Sanford). Deciding to take revenge, he invents a new toy named "Atomic Space Rats" that includes a substance which when someone is sprayed with, it makes adults act like children and children be greedy. Everyone at the Daily Planet is affected, including Clark, and they start fighting over gifts. Clark realizes that the whole situation has to do with the "Space Rats" and along with Lois they try to find out who is the creator of the new toys. Their investigation leads them to Schott who gets arrested for his creation but also regrets and makes clear that he cares and loves kids. In the meantime, Superman asks toy store owners to donate toys to the orphanage kids and Lois plans a Christmas dinner for family and friends. All of them though end up having other plans and Lois is alone at her apartment until Clark appears on her door, having canceled his Christmas with his family to be with her.
| 32 | 10 | "Metallo" | James Bagdonas | Story by : Jim Crocker; Teleplay by : Tony Blake & Paul Jackson | January 1, 1995 | 456460 | 17.4 |
Lois' sister Lucy (Roxana Zal) moves back into the town with her new boyfriend Johnny (Scott Valentine), who Lois does not like and tries to convince Lucy that he is no good for her and using her, leading them to fight. In the meantime, two scientists Rollie and Emmet Vale (Christian Clemenson and John Rubinstein) create robots that they use to rob jewelries. After Johnny gets shot by police during a robbery, the two scientists take his head and transform him into a cyborg that is powered by Kryptonite. Under the name Metallo, Johnny uses his new body to steal money from ATMs and also tries to defeat Superman. On their first confrontation, Superman is defeated due to the kryptonite that is hidden in Johnny's body as it is the source of his power. Superman realizes the existence of the kryptonite and the next time they meet, he knows how to fight Johnny without him getting affected by the kryptonite. Johnny gets defeated while one of the scientists get arrested and the other one runs away with the kryptonite.
| 33 | 11 | "Chi of Steel" | James Hayman | Hilary J. Bader | January 8, 1995 | 456461 | 20.0 |
When the men's club Perry is a member of is robbed and his life savings are taken, Lois and Clark begin to investigate to find out what happened. Their investigation leads them to Chinatown where they find out from Chen Chow (Yuji Okumoto), a friend of Clark's, that someone with the same martial arts knowledge has also robbed several times a specific company in Chinatown. The thief seems to act like a modern Robin Hood who steals from the rich and gives to the poor and is also using two bracelets with special power that allow them to use Superman's strength against him and even kill him. When the leader of the mafia finds out about the power of the bracelets, he wants them instead of his money, so he will kill Superman. Everyone believes that the thief is Chen Chow since his grandfather (James Hong) teaches the martial arts the thief is using and is also the owner of the bracelets. As it is revealed though, the thief is Lin Chow (Leila Lee Olsen) the granddaughter and not Chen Chow. The mafia captures the grandfather, takes the bracelets and asks Lin to bring Superman to them otherwise they will kill her grandfather. Lin manages to teach Superman how to fight against Jzuk-Mao (Nathan Jung) who will be wearing the bracelets, so he will not get killed. Jzuk-Mao is defeated and leader of the mafia is arrested, Superman gets the bracelets and gives them back to grandfather Chow who gives them to Lin because she earned them and is a 10th Level Yi Chi Master. Guest star: Brian Doyle-Murray as Harlan Black
| 34 | 12 | "The Eyes Have It" | Bill D'Elia | Story by : Kathy McCormick & Grant Rosenberg; Teleplay by : Kathy McCormick | January 22, 1995 | 456462 | 16.7 |
Dr. Faraday (Harvey J. Alperin) runs away from Dr. Harry Leit (David Bowe) to protect a device he created that can transmit information to someone's brain through a beam of light. Faraday ends up in Lois' apartment and uses the device on her before he gets killed. Lois falls into a trance for few minutes and she misses the faces of the two other men coming into her apartment after Faraday. Lois and Clark try to discover more information on Faraday while Lois can explain things in his research that no one understands. Leit tries to find the device by asking Lois but when Superman comes to save her, Leit uses another device on him causing him to go blind. Lois takes Superman to her apartment to take care of him till his sight returns. Leit kidnaps Lois to force her tell him where Faraday's device is and when Superman realizes what Leit is looking for, he goes to Daily Planet to get it before him. Leit arrives there with Lois and while he tries to get Faraday's device, Lois manages to take the antidote for Superman's blindness. Leit gets arrested and everything goes back to normal. In the meantime, everyone believes that Clark has spent a weekend away with Mayson (Farrah Forke) since when she asked him out, and everyone thought that Clark accepted her proposal. They, however, were unaware that he spent the whole weekend with Lois while he was blind when he was Superman. At the end of the episode, Lois learns that this was not the case and asks Clark where he has been the last three days but he has no answer.
| 35 | 13 | "The Phoenix" | Philip Sgriccia | Tony Blake & Paul Jackson | February 12, 1995 | 456463 | 20.0 |
Clark finally finds the courage to ask Lois out on a date which she accepts after thinking about it for a while. But their plans are ruined when Dr. Gretchen Kelly (Denise Crosby) brings Lex Luthor (John Shea) back from the dead. Lex is determined to get his fortune and Lois back and kill Superman and works with Gretchen and his old servant Nigel (Tony Jay) to achieve it. When he learns that Rollie Vale (Christian Clemenson) (who is in prison following the events on the episode Metallo) has kryptonite in his possession, he visits him in prison and makes a deal with him; his freedom and money in exchange for the kryptonite. Lex manages to break Vale out and he also kidnaps Lois to force her come back to him. Back at Lex's hideout, Lex gives the kryptonite to Nigel to keep it safe, but Nigel betrays Lex by stealing it and shooting a bolt at him before escaping. Gretchen is accidentally killed during a scuffle and an argument with Lex after she pushes Lois into a rat pit. Superman arrives to save Lois and when Lex realizes that he will be led to jail, he tries to kill himself like he did the last time. This time though, Superman stops him and he ends up behind the bars while Lois and Clark try to reschedule their first date.
| 36 | 14 | "Top Copy" | Randall Zisk | John McNamara | February 19, 1995 | 456464 | 19.7 |
A television news reporter, Diana Stride (Raquel Welch), wants to discover the true identity of Superman and expose him to the public. Her first attempts are not much successful since Clark manages every time to appear in front of her as Superman, before she realizes who he really is. At the same time, Mr. X, a former member of Intergang, is about to testify against Intergang and one of its assassins. As it turns out, the assassin is Diana, who attempts to silence him before he does it. Superman gets in her way and she decides to kill him. She kisses Superman while wearing a kryptonite lipstick, something that makes Superman very sick since the kryptonite enters his body and spreads like a cancer. Before he is rushed to the hospital, Diana finds out that Clark Kent is Superman and makes a story about it on TV while Superman finds a way to "kill" the kryptonite that is inside him. Everyone is surprised when they hear the news about Superman's true identity and Clark organizes a press interview to prove that he is not Superman. With the help of his parents, they create a hologram of Superman that appears during the interview while Clark is also standing there, and Superman explains that Clark is his friend and he helps him by keeping his things at his house. After the press interview, Superman goes on to arrest Diana.
| 37 | 15 | "Return of the Prankster" | Philip Sgriccia | Grant Rosenberg | February 26, 1995 | 456465 | 18.9 |
Kyle Griffin (Bronson Pinchot), also known as "The Prankster", escapes from prison using a new weapon he created that freezes people when a yellow beam of light is flashed into their eyes. Using it, he harasses Lois while at the same time he plans to kidnap the President of the United States who is visiting Metropolis. Lois and Clark, with the help of Dr. Hamilton (John Pleshette), they find a way to resist to Griffin's weapon by wearing special eye contacts. Griffin, thinking that his plans for kidnapping the President go as he planned, he is surprised to find out that his weapon is not longer working on Lois and Superman. Superman destroys his weapon and Griffin is headed back to jail while Lois finally gets the exclusive interview from the President.
| 38 | 16 | "Lucky Leon" | Jim Pohl | Chris Ruppenthal | March 12, 1995 | 456466 | 21.0 |
Lois and Clark try again to have their first date when Jimmy gets arrested for a murder. Perry bails him out and everyone tries to find out who the real murderer is. In the meantime, Superman is tricked and steals nuclear warheads from the government to give them to terrorists, thinking that he was doing the opposite; returning stolen nuclear warheads to the government. As it is revealed, behind the murder and the stealing, is Jimmy's boss from his second job, Lucky Leon (John Kapelos), who is also involved with Intergang. Superman finds where Lucky Leon is and gets him arrested, returning the nuclear warheads to where they belong. During the episode, Lois and Clark do have their first date and it ends as a success, but Lois tells Clark that she can't see him anymore. The next day, it seems strange between the two, and Clark tries to find out from Lois what he did wrong. Before she can give an answer, Mayson interrupts them and asks Clark to have lunch with her. After they leave, both Jimmy and Lois get calls with information regarding Lucky Leon, but they are unaware that Lucky Leon was listening to their conversation the entire time. Lois, Jimmy, and Clark track Lucky Leon to his old factory with the stolen weapons. They also find out that he is working for Intergang, before they can get help they are captured. Clark scares them off by setting off one of the warheads, but it has a backup timer, so Superman is forced to kick it into the sky, setting it off at a safe distance. Once everyone is safe, he goes after the criminals, and clears Jimmy's name as well. Also, Superman returns the weapons and is clear of all charges. At the end of the episode, they kissed for the first time. While they are kissing, Mayson (Farrah Forke) gets into her car which is rigged with a bomb. Clark hears the bomb and runs to save Mayson but he gets there too late. Before she dies, Mayson sees his Superman costume underneath his clothes and realizes that he is Superman and she also whispers into his ear the word: "resurrection". Last appearance: Farrah Forke as Mayson Drake.
| 39 | 17 | "Resurrection" | Joseph Scanlan | Gene Miller & Karen Kavner | March 19, 1995 | 456467 | 17.8 |
Lois and Clark investigate the murder of Mayson (Farrah Forke) trying to find out who is behind it, when DEA agent Dan Scardino (Jim Pirri) also arrives in town investigating the same case. Scardino is attracted to Lois, something that makes Clark jealous especially when Lois defends him for his actions. Their investigation leads them to discover that a former scientist of S.T.A.R. Labs, Stanley Gables (Dennis Lipscomb), developed a pill that makes people look dead for few hours and then they wake up perfectly fine. Gables uses the pill to fake the death of three criminals who are in prison and break them out of there as dead. Gables plan is to release a deadly virus (Virus A) in the city to revenge a mistake that happened while he was working on S.T.A.R. Labs and made him catch the specific virus. Superman manages to stop him before the virus is spread to the whole town and Gables, along with the three criminals who escaped prison, get arrested. Scardino asks Lois if it would be okay with her to ask her out some time while Clark is watching.
| 40 | 18 | "Tempus Fugitive" | James Bagdonas | Jack Weinstein & Lee Hudson | March 26, 1995 | 456468 | 21.3 |
The legendary author H. G. Wells (Terry Kiser), arrives at the Daily Planet and wants to talk to Lois and Clark. When they hear he is from the future, they believe he is crazy and try to ignore him but Wells gets Clark's attention when he tells him that he knows he is Superman. Wells leads Lois and Clark to his time machine to meet Tempus (Lane Davies) only to discover that Tempus likes this new world instead of his ideal one, Utopia, and decides that he wants to travel back in time to when Superman first arrived on Earth, to kill him. Tempus and Wells travel back in time but Wells changes the date to 1866 instead of 1966 to earn some time while at the same time he leaves behind the instructions of how to build the time machine. Superman builds the time machine and Lois and Clark get to 1966 where they realize that Tempus and Wells traveled to 1866 and they head there too. In 1866, Tempus reveals the truth about Superman's true identity to Lois, before he travels with Wells to 1966, and Lois is furious with Clark for not telling her. Eventually, they all arrive in 1966 where Lois and Clark manage to stop Tempus killing an infant Superman and they make sure the Kents will find the baby. Wells takes Tempus in Dystopia and returns to take Lois and Clark back to present but a few moments before his first arrival so they will not remember anything, including Lois not remembering that Clark is Superman. Lois writes it down before they travel but Clark finds it and takes it away before Lois reads her own note.
| 41 | 19 | "Target: Jimmy Olsen!" | David Jackson | Tony Blake & Paul Jackson | April 2, 1995 | 456469 | 18.4 |
Jimmy's doctor, Dr. Golden (David Sage), is murdered and Lois and Clark investigate to find out who killed him. Their investigation leads them to discover about a project, Project Valhalla, that started twenty years ago when a military doctor, Dr. Wilder, injected three infants with a virus that would allow him to control their mind when they would get older, one of the kids being Jimmy. The plan was to turn these kids into assassins but when he was discovered, he was discharged. Now, Dr. Wilder is dead but his wife, Claudette (Michelle Phillips), and daughter, Dr. Katherine Wilder (Claire Yarlett), try to complete his project. They manage to activate the virus in all three kids and while the first one dies, Jimmy and Sarah (Meredith Scott Lynn), try to kill Lois and Clark while being under orders. Superman stops Jimmy before hurting Lois and Claudette and Katherine get arrested, while Jimmy and Sarah get to the hospital to remove the virus from their system. In the meantime, Lois tries to talk to Clark about her feelings but every time she does, Clark runs off because someone needs Superman. Lois, who can't understand his behavior, is frustrated and ends up accepting Scardino's (Jim Pirri) proposal to go out for a date.
| 42 | 20 | "Individual Responsibility" | Alan J. Levi | Chris Ruppenthal | April 16, 1995 | 456470 | 15.7 |
The leader of Intergang Bill Church Snr. is retired and his son, Bill Church Jr. (Bruce Campbell), takes over. Intergang wants to buy the Daily Planet but fails while at the same time they discover a new type of kryptonite that is red and not green. While trying to convince Perry to sell the newspaper, they try out the new kryptonite on Superman to see what effect it has on him. The results show that when Superman is exposed to it, he becomes apathetic and does not care about anything. Intergang takes advantage of this in order to kidnap Perry while Superman wonders why he is acting that way. Lois sends him to Dr. Friskin (Barbara Bosson), a psychotherapist, to help him out. Dr. Friskin believes that Superman needs a vacation because of all the stress he puts on himself but during a session, the red kryptonite that Intergang put in her office is found by Superman and they realize that this is the reason for his behaviour. Superman fights the effects the red kryptonite has on him and saves Perry while Church ends up in jail and the Daily Planet reveals that he was the leader of Intergang. Lois and Clark take a second chance on dating with Clark promising he won't run off again.
| 43 | 21 | "Whine, Whine, Whine" | Michael W. Watkins | Kathy McCormick & John McNamara | May 14, 1995 | 456471 | 17.1 |
Lois and Clark are out on a date but Clark has to leave once again to save someone leaving Lois alone. The musician he saves though, Calvin (Jason Carter), sues him for breaking his arm meaning Superman must start searching for a lawyer while Lois is furious with Clark. Clark, not knowing what else to do, decides that he cannot be two people anymore and wants to move away from Metropolis so Lois can be happy. In the meantime, Lois discovers that Scardino (Jim Pirri) is hiding things from her regarding his job and feels like he does not trust her. Lois is lost between three men - Clark, Superman and Scardino - and asks for help from Dr. Friskin (Barbara Bosson) who tells her that she has known all along who she really wants but she is afraid to admit it. While going to the court, Superman finds out that Bill Church Jr. (Bruce Campbell) is free again but he can't do anything about it. During Superman's trial, Church attempts to kill everyone in the courtroom but Superman saves everyone by getting the bomb away. After that, Calvin pretends to have been blinded, but his wife Elise (Michele Abrams), sick of his insensitive and childish behavior, berates him, reveals the truth about him and demands a divorce, leading Superman to win the case. Lois tells Superman that they can only be friends, Scardino that they can't see each other and goes to Clark to admit her true feelings for him. The two kiss, thus beginning their romance. Last appearance: Jim Pirri as Dan Scardino.
| 44 | 22 | "And the Answer Is..." | Alan J. Levi | Tony Blake & Paul Jackson | May 21, 1995 | 456472 | 20.0 |
Clark decides to tell Lois he is Superman when Jason Mayzik (Maurice Godin) calls to inform him that he knows his real identity. Mayzik has the diary of Tempus in his possession where it's described with details their journey back in time (from "Tempus Fugitive"). Mayzik wants Clark to steal $20 million in diamonds in order to not reveal who he really is. Clark refuses to do it but when Mayzik kidnaps his parents, who are in town to celebrate their anniversary, and threatens to kill them, Clark has no choice other than do as he was told. It is revealed that Mayzik works with Nigel St. John (Tony Jay), Lex Luthor's former accomplice, who has kryptonite in his possession, and they plan to kill Superman after he brings them the diamonds. In the meantime, Lois follows Clark and witnesses him robbing the diamonds. In shock she confronts him and Clark tells her that his parents have been kidnapped. Lois works with him to help him find his parents and their investigation leads them to Mayzik and his connection to Nigel. When Mayzik wants Superman to kill Lois, Lois comes up with a plan that involves Superman freezing her with his breath so she will look dead till he manages to save Clark's parents. Superman isn't very willing to do it but he eventually does. Just before he does it, he touches Lois on her face and at that moment Lois realizes that Superman is Clark since he touched her the exact same way before. Superman delivers Lois' "body" to Mayzik and Nigel and they, using the kryptonite, lock him up with his parents to die. Mayzik kills Nigel after he attempts to betray him, takes the diamonds and leaves. Superman and the Kents manage to escape and Superman unfreezes Lois while later on, he destroys the diary and takes Mayzik to the police. At the end of the episode, Clark doesn't get the chance to tell Lois he is Superman but he does ask her to marry him, she only says "Clark" before the episode ends. Last appearance: Tony Jay as Nigel St. John.
