= List of Lois & Clark: The New Adventures of Superman episodes =

The following is an episode list for the television series Lois & Clark: The New Adventures of Superman. In the United States, the show aired on ABC, premiering on September 12, 1993, and concluding on June 14, 1997. At the end of its run, 87 (or 88 if the 2 hour pilot is split up) episodes had aired. The show is available on DVD in Regions 1, 2, and 4.

Lois & Clark: The New Adventures of Superman follows the life of Clark Kent/Superman (Dean Cain) and Lois Lane (Teri Hatcher) as they first meet, and begin a working and romantic relationship with each other. The series featured Lane Smith as Perry White, K Callan as Martha Kent, Eddie Jones as Jonathan Kent, and John Shea as Lex Luthor. Jimmy Olsen was played by Michael Landes in season one; he was let go at the end of the first season due to producers thinking he looked too much like Dean Cain. Justin Whalin was brought in for season two, and he continued the role until the series ended.

== Series overview ==
Season	Episodes	Originally released	
Season	Episodes	First released	Last released
1	22	September 12, 1993	May 8, 1994
2	22	September 18, 1994	May 21, 1995
3	22	September 17, 1995	May 12, 1996
4	22	September 22, 1996	June 14, 1997

== Episodes ==
=== Season 1 (1993–94) ===
No. overall	No. in season	Title	Directed by	Written by	Original release date	U.S. viewers (millions)
1	1	"Pilot"	Robert Butler	Deborah Joy LeVine	September 12, 1993	18.3
2	2	"Pilot"	Robert Butler	Deborah Joy LeVine	September 12, 1993	18.3
3	3	"Strange Visitor (From Another Planet)"	Randall Zisk	Bryce Zabel	September 26, 1993	16.3
4	4	"Neverending Battle"	Gene Reynolds	Daniel Levine	October 3, 1993	16.4
5	5	"I'm Looking Through You"	Mark Sobel	Deborah Joy LeVine	October 10, 1993	19.3
6	6	"Requiem for a Super Hero"	Randall Zisk	Robert Killbrew	October 17, 1993	19.0
7	7	"I've Got a Crush on You"	Gene Reynolds	Thania St. John	October 24, 1993	17.4
8	8	"Smart Kids"	Robert Singer	Daniel Levine	October 31, 1993	17.6
9	9	"The Green, Green Glow of Home"	Les Landau	Bryce Zabel	November 14, 1993	15.2
10	10	"The Man of Steel Bars"	Robert Butler	Paris Qualles	November 21, 1993	18.6
11	11	"Pheromone, My Lovely"	Bill D'Elia	Deborah Joy LeVine	November 28, 1993	20.0
12	12	"Honeymoon in Metropolis"	James A. Contner	Daniel Levine	December 12, 1993	16.9
13	13	"All Shook Up"	Felix Enriquez Alcala	Bryce Zabel and Jackson Gillis	January 2, 1994	18.9
14	14	"Witness"	Mel Damski	Bradley Moore	January 9, 1994	19.1
15	15	"Illusions of Grandeur"	Michael W. Watkins	Thania St. John	January 23, 1994	22.3
16	16	"The Ides of Metropolis"	Philip Sgriccia	Deborah Joy LeVine	February 6, 1994	17.7
17	17	"The Foundling"	Bill D'Elia	Daniel Levine	February 20, 1994	14.2
18	18	"The Rival"	Michael W. Watkins	Tony Blake and Paul Jackson	February 27, 1994	19.8
19	19	"Vatman"	Randall Zisk	Deborah Joy LeVine	March 13, 1994	19.7
20	20	"Fly Hard"	Philip Sgriccia	Thania St. John	March 27, 1994	17.0
21	21	"Barbarians at the Planet"	James Bagdonas	Daniel Levine and Deborah Joy LeVine	May 1, 1994	13.8
22	22	"The House of Luthor"	Alan J. Levi	Daniel Levine	May 8, 1994	17.0

=== Season 2 (1994–95) ===
No. overall	No. in season	Title	Directed by	Written by	Original release date	Prod. code	U.S. viewers (millions)
23	1	"Madame Ex"	Randall Zisk	Tony Blake & Paul Jackson	September 18, 1994	456451	16.1
24	2	"Wall of Sound"	Alan J. Levi	John McNamara	September 25, 1994	456452	16.8
25	3	"The Source"	John T. Kretchmer	Tony Blake & Paul Jackson	October 2, 1994	456453	17.1
26	4	"The Prankster"	James Hayman	Grant Rosenberg	October 9, 1994	456454	16.1
27	5	"Church of Metropolis"	Robert Singer	John McNamara	October 23, 1994	456455	18.2
28	6	"Operation Blackout"	Michael W. Watkins	Kate Boutilier	October 30, 1994	456456	15.6
29	7	"That Old Gang of Mine"	Lorraine Senna Ferrara	Gene Miller & Karen Kavnar	November 13, 1994	456457	19.8
30	8	"A Bolt From the Blue"	Philip Sgriccia	Kathy McCormick	November 20, 1994	456458	20.3
31	9	"Season's Greedings"	Randall Zisk	Dean Cain	December 4, 1994	456459	19.0
32	10	"Metallo"	James Bagdonas	Story by : Jim Crocker; Teleplay by : Tony Blake & Paul Jackson	January 1, 1995	456460	17.4
33	11	"Chi of Steel"	James Hayman	Hilary J. Bader	January 8, 1995	456461	20.0
34	12	"The Eyes Have It"	Bill D'Elia	Story by : Kathy McCormick & Grant Rosenberg; Teleplay by : Kathy McCormick	January 22, 1995	456462	16.7
35	13	"The Phoenix"	Philip Sgriccia	Tony Blake & Paul Jackson	February 12, 1995	456463	20.0
36	14	"Top Copy"	Randall Zisk	John McNamara	February 19, 1995	456464	19.7
37	15	"Return of the Prankster"	Philip Sgriccia	Grant Rosenberg	February 26, 1995	456465	18.9
38	16	"Lucky Leon"	Jim Pohl	Chris Ruppenthal	March 12, 1995	456466	21.0
39	17	"Resurrection"	Joseph Scanlan	Gene Miller & Karen Kavner	March 19, 1995	456467	17.8
40	18	"Tempus Fugitive"	James Bagdonas	Jack Weinstein & Lee Hudson	March 26, 1995	456468	21.3
41	19	"Target: Jimmy Olsen!"	David Jackson	Tony Blake & Paul Jackson	April 2, 1995	456469	18.4
42	20	"Individual Responsibility"	Alan J. Levi	Chris Ruppenthal	April 16, 1995	456470	15.7
43	21	"Whine, Whine, Whine"	Michael W. Watkins	Kathy McCormick & John McNamara	May 14, 1995	456471	17.1
44	22	"And the Answer Is..."	Alan J. Levi	Tony Blake & Paul Jackson	May 21, 1995	456472	20.0

=== Season 3 (1995–96) ===
No. overall	No. in season	Title	Directed by	Written by	Original release date	U.S. viewers (millions)
45	1	"We Have a Lot to Talk About"	Philip Sgriccia	John McNamara	September 17, 1995	20.8
46	2	"Ordinary People"	Michael W. Watkins	Eugenie Ross-Leming and Brad Buckner	September 24, 1995	19.6
47	3	"Contact"	Daniel Attias	Chris Ruppenthal	October 1, 1995	18.7
48	4	"When Irish Eyes Are Killing"	Winrich Kolbe	Grant Rosenberg	October 15, 1995	19.7
49	5	"Just Say Noah"	David Jackson	Brad Buckner and Eugenie Ross-Leming	October 22, 1995	18.4
50	6	"Don't Tug on Superman's Cape"	Steven Dubin	David Simkins	November 5, 1995	18.3
51	7	"Ultra Woman"	Mike Vejar	Gene F. O'Neill and Noreen Tobin	November 12, 1995	22.3
52	8	"Chip Off the Old Clark"	Michael W. Watkins	Michael Jamin and Sivert Glarum	November 19, 1995	21.1
53	9	"Super Mann"	James Bagdonas	Chris Ruppenthal	November 26, 1995	18.9
54	10	"Virtually Destroyed"	Jim Charleston	Dean Cain and Sean Brennan	December 10, 1995	18.9
55	11	"Home Is Where the Hurt Is"	Geoffrey Nottage	Eugenie Ross-Leming and Brad Buckner	December 17, 1995	17.0
56	12	"Never on Sunday"	Michael Lange	Grant Rosenberg	January 7, 1996	19.7
57	13	"The Dad Who Came In From the Cold"	Alan J. Levi	David Simkins	January 14, 1996	18.6
58	14	"Tempus, Anyone?"	Winrich Kolbe	John McNamara	January 21, 1996	17.3
59	15	"I Now Pronounce You..."	Jim Pohl	Chris Ruppenthal	February 11, 1996	21.2
60	16	"Double Jeopardy"	Chris Long	Eugenie Ross-Leming and Brad Buckner	February 18, 1996	19.8
61	17	"Seconds"	Alan J. Levi	Corey Miller	February 25, 1996	19.8
62	18	"Forget Me Not"	James Bagdonas	Grant Rosenberg	March 10, 1996	18.5
63	19	"Oedipus Wrecks"	Kenn Fuller	David Simkins	March 24, 1996	16.9
64	20	"It's a Small World After All"	Philip Sgriccia	Pat Hazell and Teri Hatcher	April 28, 1996	15.4
65	21	"Through a Glass, Darkly"	Chris Long	Chris Ruppenthal	May 5, 1996	16.1
66	22	"Big Girls Don't Fly"	Philip Sgriccia	Eugenie Ross-Leming and Brad Buckner	May 12, 1996	14.8

=== Season 4 (1996–97) ===
No. overall	No. in season	Title	Directed by	Written by	Original release date	U.S. viewers (millions)
67	1	"Lord of the Flys"	Philip Sgriccia	Eugenie Ross-Leming and Brad Buckner	September 22, 1996	12.2
68	2	"Battleground Earth"	Philip Sgriccia	Brad Buckner and Eugenie Ross-Leming	September 29, 1996	13.5
69	3	"Swear to God, This Time We're Not Kidding"	Michael Lange	John McNamara	October 6, 1996	14.9
70	4	"Soul Mates"	Richard Friedman	Brad Kern	October 13, 1996	12.7
71	5	"Brutal Youth"	David Grossman	Tim Minear	October 20, 1996	12.7
72	6	"The People vs. Lois Lane"	Robert Ginty	Grant Rosenberg	October 27, 1996	11.1
73	7	"Dead Lois Walking"	Chris Long	Brad Buckner and Eugenie Ross-Leming	November 10, 1996	12.2
74	8	"Bob and Carol and Lois and Clark"	Oz Scott	Brian Nelson	November 17, 1996	12.1
75	9	"Ghosts"	Robert Ginty	Michael Gleason	November 24, 1996	12.6
76	10	"Stop the Presses"	Peter Ellis	Brad Kern	December 8, 1996	12.2
77	11	"'Twas the Night Before Mxymas"	Mike Vejar	Tim Minear	December 15, 1996	11.1
78	12	"Lethal Weapon"	Jim Charleston	Grant Rosenberg	January 5, 1997	8.87
79	13	"Sex, Lies and Videotape"	Philip Sgriccia	Andrew Dettman and Daniel Truly	January 19, 1997	9.91
80	14	"Meet John Doe"	Jim Pohl	Tim Minear	March 2, 1997	7.97
81	15	"Lois and Clarks"	Chris Long	Eugenie Ross-Leming and Brad Buckner	March 9, 1997	8.48
82	16	"...aka Superman"	Robert Ginty	Jeff Vlaming	March 16, 1997	8.32
83	17	"Faster than a Speeding Vixen"	Neal Ahern	Brad Kern	April 12, 1997	5.88
84	18	"Shadow of a Doubt"	Philip Sgriccia	Grant Rosenberg	April 19, 1997	6.16
85	19	"Voice from the Past"	David Grossman	John McNamara	April 26, 1997	6.35
86	20	"I've Got You Under My Skin"	Eugenie Ross-Leming	Tim Minear	May 31, 1997	4.82
87	21	"Toy Story"	Jim Pohl	Brad Kern	June 7, 1997	4.41
88	22	"The Family Hour"	Robert Ginty	Brad Buckner and Eugenie Ross-Leming	June 14, 1997	4.88
