= Lois & Clark: The New Adventures of Superman season 3 =

Lois & Clark: The New Adventures of Superman
- Season 3
- DVD cover
- No. of episodes: 22

Release
- Original network: ABC
- Original release: September 17, 1995 – May 12, 1996

Season chronology
- ← Previous; Season 2 Next → Season 4

The third season of Lois & Clark: The New Adventures of Superman originally aired between September 17, 1995 and May 12, 1996, beginning with "We Have a Lot to Talk About".

The series loosely follows the philosophy of writer John Byrne, with Clark Kent as the true personality and Superman as a secondary disguise. As the show's title suggests, it focuses as much on the relationship between Clark Kent and Lois Lane on the adventures of Clark's alter-ego. The central characters in season 3 are Dean Cain as Clark Kent/Superman, Teri Hatcher as Lois Lane, Lane Smith as Perry White, Eddie Jones as Jonathan Kent, K Callan as Martha Kent, and Justin Whalin as Jimmy Olsen.

Season three would go on to be the most successful season of Lois & Clark in its run. The show averaged more than 18 million viewers per episode, and ranked 44th for the season. In the premiere episode, Lois revealed that she had recently learned Clark's secret identity. Only later in the seventh episode of the season, "Ultra Woman", did Lois finally accept Clark's proposal. The long-anticipated wedding was put off to coincide with the characters' marriage in the comics, which led to many storylines designed to delay and interrupt the wedding on the TV series.

Another controversy erupted when ABC announced that the wedding would actually take place Valentine's Day weekend, even sending out heart-shaped "wedding invitations" to ABC News staff, only to present viewers with a bogus wedding, in which Clark unwittingly married a clone of Lois who was developed by a mad scientist whose creations are required to ingest frogs periodically as nourishment. This started a special five-part story, with Lois being kidnapped by Lex Luthor who had put the clone in her place and later with Lois suffering amnesia after a sharp hit on the head and needing to regain her memory.

The wedding of Lois and Clark was scheduled and prepared by DC's Superman comics team for release during what would have worked out to be the third season of Lois and Clark. The ongoing Superman comics are not affiliated with television or movies and move in their own direction at their own pace. When the comic book wedding became known to the producers of the Lois and Clark television series, they asked the DC Comics team to postpone the wedding issue as they were planning to marry Lois and Clark in their fourth season and it would help them if the comic book wedding were to coincide with their television program. The DC comics team agreed to postpone their wedding issue.

== Episodes ==
No. overall	No. in season	Title	Directed by	Written by	Original release date	U.S. viewers (millions)
45	1	"We Have a Lot to Talk About"	Philip Sgriccia	John McNamara	September 17, 1995	20.8
Lois answers to Clark's proposal with the question, "Who's asking? Clark or Superman?" and when Clark asks how long she has known, she says since the previous night. Lois is hurt and mad because Clark was lying to her all this time while Clark tries to explain why he could not tell her his secret. While Lois tries to come to terms with the revelation of Superman's identity, Bill Church (Peter Boyle) returns to Metropolis wanting to make it the safest city. Despite his good intentions, Lois and Clark do not trust this change of heart and try to prove that Church has not changed. Bill Church Jr. (Bruce Campbell) along with Mindy (Jessica Collins), Church's new wife, try to set up Church by placing a bomb at the museum's gala to send him to prison. Lois manages to disarm the bomb with Clark's help while Bill Church and his son get arrested and Mindy takes over the company and resurrects Intergang. Later on, Clark, as Superman, takes Lois on a trip to above the clouds in the night sky. Clark tells Lois that he'll wait for her, and Lois tells him that she loves him and that he's not alone anymore. The couple kiss while floating in the moonlight.
46	2	"Ordinary People"	Michael W. Watkins	Eugenie Ross-Leming and Brad Buckner	September 24, 1995	19.6
The Daily Planet receives an invitation to visit an island resort for a review and Perry convinces Lois and Clark to be the ones to go so they can work on their relationship. Lois and Clark challenge each other that while being at the island, Lois will not work and Clark won't use any of his superpowers. This bet seems to work fine and the two of them start to have a good time when Spencer Spencer (David Leisure), the owner of the "resort", kidnaps them in order to make Superman come to their rescue. Spencer wants to steal Superman's body to replace his own deformed one. Clark, to save Lois' life, reveals that he is Superman, and Spencer uses kryptonite to make him weak and be able to operate on him. While preparing to operate, Lois escapes and saves Superman's life.
47	3	"Contact"	Daniel Attias	Chris Ruppenthal	October 1, 1995	18.7
Lois drives home when she appears to have been abducted by aliens. In the following days, she seems to get into a trance situation and does things that put her life in danger, like jumping out of a helicopter. Superman saves her every time and when she investigates about it with Clark, they discover that every time it happens, someone steals scientific gadgets. They figure out that aliens did not abduct Lois but someone took her and injected her with a chip to make her do things and distract Superman, but they made it look like an alien abduction. Lois and Clark find who is responsible for this and bring him to justice while Clark realizes that being with Lois puts her in constant danger since Superman's enemies use her as a target. He tells her that they cannot be together and breaks up with her.
48	4	"When Irish Eyes Are Killing"	Winrich Kolbe	Grant Rosenberg	October 15, 1995	19.7
Patrick Sullivan (Julian Stone), an old friend of Lois, arrives in Metropolis and he makes clear that he is in love with her and asks her out. Lois accepts his offer to make Clark jealous. In the meantime, rare antique items are being stolen from different museums and a deposit box. Clark puts the pieces together and tells Lois that Patrick is the one who steals the items in order to make a Druidic sacrifice using her as the human sacrifice, but Lois believes that Clark is just jealous. Clark is proven right and Superman saves Lois at the last minute and also destroys the mask with the emeralds that Patrick stole to give him the power to make the sacrifice. At the end of the episode, Clark tells Lois that he was wrong to break up with her, and that he will always love her. When he tries to get back together with Lois, she politely, says no, saying that she doesn't want another heartbreak from him, for although she survived this one, she doesn't think she can survive another. He leaves, as they both wonder the future of their relationship.
49	5	"Just Say Noah"	David Jackson	Brad Buckner and Eugenie Ross-Leming	October 22, 1995	18.4
After the disappearance of a couple who lives next door to Lois, Lois and Clark discover that they are not the first couple who have gone missing in the last few days. Their investigation leads them to The Larry Smiley Institute for Love & Commitment, since all the couples who went missing had previously visited him. The opportunity to work undercover at the institute as a married couple helps them work on their relationship as well while they discover that Larry Smiley (Mac Davis) believes he is Noah and wants to flood the Earth. He collects couples of each profession to save them from the flood and recreate the Earth afterwards. One of the couples is Perry and Alice, but Lois and Superman manage to stop him before he proceeds with his plan.
50	6	"Don't Tug on Superman's Cape"	Steven Dubin	David Simkins	November 5, 1995	18.3
Tim (Jonathan Frakes) and Amber (Genie Francis) Lake, a couple with a passion for collecting rare objects, attempt to add Superman to their collection. To manage that, they help Bad Brain Johnson (Michael Harris) to break out the prison so they can use him and his inventions for their plan. Using his machine the ElectroWhammy, They kill him as soon as he gets out and then frame everything they do to look like he did it. They target Lois and Clark and after making everyone think they killed Lois with Bad Brain's ElectroWhammy, they kidnap her and she becomes part of their collection. Superman puts the pieces together and realises who is behind everything and when he attempts to capture the Lakes, they use Lois as a bait to capture him. Superman uses his powers to escape the prison he is locked up in and, after helping Lois, he brings the Lakes to justice.
51	7	"Ultra Woman"	Mike Vejar	Gene F. O'Neill and Noreen Tobin	November 12, 1995	22.3
Two sisters, Lucille (Shelley Long) and Nell (Mary Gross) Newtrich (sisters of Gene Newtrich from a previous episode), try to use the red kryptonite Gene gave them to make Superman apathetic so they will be able to steal $20 million. When they shoot him with the red beam though, Superman hugs Lois to protect her resulting in his superpowers being transferred to her. Lois asks Martha's help for a costume, similar to Superman's costume, so people will not recognize her while she will be doing Superman's job under the identity of Ultra Woman. Jimmy completely falls for Ultra Woman asking Lois to help him get in touch. When Lucille and Nell discover what really happened, they try to transfer Ultra Woman's powers to Lucille while Superman asks for Dr. Klein's (Kenneth Kimmins) help to recreate the weapon Nell used to steal his powers. Lucille and Nell rob a bank and when Ultra Woman and Superman get there, they manage to trick them and Superman gets his powers back sending Lucille and Nell to prison with Nell suggesting Lucille should "pray we don't end up sharing a cell" with Lucille quipping "ooh I'm really scared!". After her experience as Ultra Woman, Lois realizes how difficult life is for Clark being Superman and trying to save the world all the time and that being in his shoes for a little while has made her love him more. She asks him to marry her and he says "Who's asking? Lois or Ultra Woman?" to which she replies "Who's answering? Clark or Superman?" he says "I'm answering" Lois then says "I'm waiting" and then Clark says "yes".
52	8	"Chip Off the Old Clark"	Michael W. Watkins	Michael Jamin and Sivert Glarum	November 19, 1995	21.1
Lois and Clark try to enjoy their first days together as an engaged couple when a woman named Leigh-Anne Stipanovic (Susan Batten), appears on National TV claiming to have had Superman's child, Jesse Stipanovic (Alex D. Linz). Clark insists that she is lying, but Lois is uncertain what to believe when Jesse picks up a sofa and flies during the interview with Leigh-Anne. While Superman asks for a DNA test, Clark investigates and finds out the reason Jesse has superpowers; Superman saved a plane from crashing and a lightning bolt hit him, transferring part of his powers to Jesse who was a passenger on the plane (like in the case of William Wallace Webster Waldecker a.k.a. Resplendent Man in Season 2 episode "A Bolt From the Blue"). Leigh-Anne was scared that Superman would sue and take Jesse away from her. Clark told Leigh-Anne that Superman would not and understands why she did this as she loves her son. In the meantime, a criminal known as Anonymous (Dave Coulier), who is a master of disguise, kidnaps Jesse to use him in kidnapping the President of Fostonia. Anonymous wants the President (Michael Kagan) to give him the codes of a nuclear missile to launch it, something that he manages to do but Superman stops the missile in time and Anonymous is arrested. Leigh-Anne and Jesse say goodbye to Clark and Lois and want to thank Superman for saving Jesse. Leigh-Anne is enrolled in beauty school and Jesse returns to Kindergarten.
53	9	"Super Mann"	James Bagdonas	Chris Ruppenthal	November 26, 1995	18.9
Two years ago, three Nazi officers woke up from a long sleep and, after finding out that they lost the war, they want to create a new Nazi country in the US and then, dominate the whole world. To do that, they have to first eliminate Superman so he will not be able to stop them. In the present day, Lois and Clark try to organize their wedding but their plans are put on hold to investigate this Nazi organisation known as "N.S.B.A: National Society for a Better America". Superman is sent to a trap where a nuclear bomb explodes making it impossible for anyone to get near him without dying. He locks himself in a special shield room but with Lois' help, they find a way to remove the nuclear energy from his body and stop the Nazis before it is too late. Superman eventually stopped the Nazis and their inside guy Skip (Sean Whalen) who worked at the Daily Planet to take down Superman.
54	10	"Virtually Destroyed"	Jim Charleston	Dean Cain and Sean Brennan	December 10, 1995	18.9
Jaxon Xavier (Andy Berman), a computer geek billionaire, invites Lois and Clark to experience and review his new virtual reality program but his real motives show when he traps the two of them inside the program. Jaxon is obsessed with Lois and Lex Luthor and wants to extract some information from her to get into Luthor's computer brainwashing programme. Lois and Clark realize that they are trapped in the program when they notice that Clark does not have his superpowers. Clark manages to escape and he returns, as Superman, with the help of Jimmy to save Lois. In the process it is revealed that Jaxon is Luthor's illegitimate son and the three of them use that information against him to escape to virtual reality. Jaxon's real purpose was to kill Superman, brainwash world leaders and make his father proud, but the system crashes and Jaxon's mind is trapped inside his virtual world forever.
55	11	"Home Is Where the Hurt Is"	Geoffrey Nottage	Eugenie Ross-Leming and Brad Buckner	December 17, 1995	17.0
Lois tries to avoid spending Christmas with her parents because they always fight but they surprise her by showing up at her apartment uninvited causing chaos. Her father, Sam (Harve Presnell), also brought with him his new fiancee, an android named Baby Gunderson (Kathy Trageser). In the meantime, Mindy Church (Jessica Collins), who is now the head of Intergang even though Intergang is shut down and keeps a low profile, plans to kill Superman using a virus from Krypton. Superman gets sick and Lois asks her father's help. Sam explains that the only cure will be if Superman gets very close to death since that way the virus will die too. The treatment is successful and Superman gets well, just in time to save Lois and his parents' life. They suspect Mindy is behind everything but Mindy manages to frame her partner Joey Bermuda A.K.A. The Handyman (Robert Carradine) for rejecting her advances, since they are both married and he believes in the sanctity of the home, and she gets away.
56	12	"Never on Sunday"	Michael Lange	Grant Rosenberg	January 7, 1996	19.7
Lois' mother, Ellen (Beverly Garland) is in Metropolis wanting to help with the wedding plans even though Lois and Clark want a small wedding while an illusionist, known as "Baron Sunday" (Cress Williams), also arrives in town. Clark starts to have nightmares where someone seems to enclose him in a coffin and at first Lois believes that they are caused due to stress for the wedding. When two other people, who worked with Clark in the past, die due to their own fears, they connect the two deaths with Clark's nightmares and their investigation leads them to Baron who came to Metropolis for revenge. Baron takes Lois planning to kill her and Clark has to face his own fear to be able to save her. When he realizes that what he sees is not a coffin but the moment his parents put him in the capsule to send him to Earth, is not afraid anymore and saves Lois capturing Baron. When the police arrives to arrest Baron they can't find him since he turned himself into a snake and escaped.
57	13	"The Dad Who Came In From the Cold"	Alan J. Levi	David Simkins	January 14, 1996	18.6
A man from NIA gives Lois a burned computer before he dies and Lois asks Jimmy to retrieve the information from it since many people seem to not want the information go in public. In the meantime, Jimmy's father, Jack (James Read), returns to Metropolis after 4 years. As it is revealed, Jack is a spy who works for the NIA and is asked to get the burned computer the soonest as possible and to not stop in front of anything. Jack backs off when he learns that Jimmy is involved and he may have to kill him. When he learns what his boss was planning to do and why he wants the computer, he helps Superman prevent the catastrophe and then gets along with his son. Meanwhile, Clark and Lois were thinking about children and when Clark saw what Jimmy's father had to do - abandon his son - to save the world, he was afraid that this might happen with him and his kid as well. Lois tells him that this will not happen because he will be a good father and will put his family first.
58	14	"Tempus, Anyone?"	Winrich Kolbe	John McNamara	January 21, 1996	17.3
Tempus (Lane Davies) returns to Metropolis and kidnaps Lois taking her to a parallel universe where things are very different than her universe; she died a couple of years ago before Clark came to work at the "Daily Planet", Jimmy is the owner of the Daily Planet, Perry is running for Mayor against Tempus and most importantly, there is no Superman. H.G. Wells (Hamilton Camp) helps Lois to remember her previous encounter with Tempus and also go back to her universe. In the meantime, Lois has to convince Clark Kent of this parallel universe to become the hero he has always been and manage to expose Tempus before he kills Perry and becomes Metropolis' Mayor. Everything works out fine and Lois, with Wells' help, has to now return to her Clark Kent and get ready for her wedding.
59	15	"I Now Pronounce You..."	Jim Pohl	Chris Ruppenthal	February 11, 1996	21.2
Lois and Clark's wedding is only few days away and Lois worries that something bad will happen. While they are trying to make everything work, Lois asks Perry to give them a story so she can get her mind away for a while. Perry gives them a story about some frogs that have been stolen from a pet shop but as it is revealed soon, this is not just a frog robbery. Their investigation leads them to discover that a scientist named Dr. Isaac Mamba (Tony Curtis), who used to work for Lex Luthor, replaced the President of the US, President Garner (Fred Willard) and one of his Secret Service agents with frog-eating clones that he has created. Lois and Clark solve the mystery and Mamba, along with the clones, get arrested while Lex escapes from prison after an official pardon that was written by the president clone. Lois and Clark get married but at the end of the episode it's revealed that the Lois who is with Clark is also a clone as the real Lois was replaced before the wedding. Note: The episode is dedicated to the memory of Superman co-creator Jerry Siegel, who died on January 28, 1996.
60	16	"Double Jeopardy"	Chris Long	Eugenie Ross-Leming and Brad Buckner	February 18, 1996	19.8
Starting from where the previous episode ended, Lois' clone pretends she is tired to avoid having sex with Clark, leaving him confused and disappointed. Clark realizes that Lois is acting weird but he does not know what is going on. At the same time, Lex Luthor (John Shea) has the real Lois and plans to leave town with her. He also tells her that Clark married the clone and that by the time he realises, the two of them will be in Lex' windowless fortress in the Alps where she can shout Superman as much as she wants but it will get boring. The clone discovers that Clark is Superman and decides that she wants to be with him. To be able to do that, she has to kill the real Lois who escapes from Lex but gets hit by a car which causes her to fall and hit her head on a letter box, thus bringing on a bout of amnesia. She believes that she is Wanda Detroit, the main character of a book she was writing and gets a job at a bar as a singer. With the clone searching for her to kill her, Lex offers Clark his help to find the "Real" Lois. When Lex hears where Lois is and that she believes she is Wanda, he pretends to be Kent (a man from the book that Wanda wants but believes she cannot have) and lies to her about who Clark is and what to tell him so the two of them can be together. When Clark finds her, Lois tells him that she never loved him and that she loves Lex and wants to be with him. Clark angrily promises Lex that he will do anything to bring Lois back even if it means going right through Lex to do it, while Lex says that this sounds like a threat and that "his" woman doesn't take kindly to threats. Lex and Lois then drive off leaving Clark alone with the clone.
61	17	"Seconds"	Alan J. Levi	Corey Miller	February 25, 1996	19.8
Lois is still with Lex Luthor (John Shea) believing that she is Wanda, the heroine from her unfinished novel, and Lex is Kent. Lex worries that Lois will soon recover her memory and plans to leave town with her as soon as possible. Lois' clone falls in love with Clark and after she apologises for trying to kill Lois, she helps him find her. Lex kidnaps the clone, angry at her betrayal and tells her that she only has two days to live. In hope that he will fix her, she tells him that Clark Kent is Superman, but Lex tells her that there is no way of increasing her life span. Lex then obtains a dangerous weapon called the A-Tech Quantum Disrupter that can kill his archenemy once and for all. He tries to convince Lois to kill Clark so her love for him will die. When all of them meet at the hideout of Lex, Lois cannot kill Superman and when Lex tries to do it, the clone tries to stop him which ends up killing them both. Clark manages to get Lois out of the hideout before it collapses while the dead bodies of the clone and Lex are both left behind. On their way out, Lois gets hit by a falling rock. It is revealed later at the hospital that the head trauma has not only stopped Lois believing that she is Wanda Detroit any longer but she now has total amnesia and neither remembers who she nor Clark or even her Daily Planet colleagues are at all. Note: This episode marks the final physical appearance of John Shea as Lex Luthor, but he returned as Luthor's voice in Season 4 for two episodes.
62	18	"Forget Me Not"	James Bagdonas	Grant Rosenberg	March 10, 1996	18.5
Lois checks into a clinic for people with memory loss to help her gain her memories back. She remembers who she is but nothing around her work and what is her relationship with Clark. Her doctor, Dr. Maxwell Deter (Larry Poindexter), falls in love with her and tells Clark that he should not tell Lois about them being a couple because it will shock her. In order to get them even more apart, Deter forbids Clark even visiting Lois while he comes closer to her. Meanwhile, another doctor in the clinic, Dr. Elias Mendenhall (Charles Cioffi), brainwashes the patients of the clinic to commit murders by using a machine that shows them pictures of the intended target and words like Kill on repeat and the phrase "Save yourself, Kill (name of intended victim)" as well as playing them "Battle Hymn of the Republic" which becomes their call to arms and then kills them by causing them to suffer a stroke. Clark investigates the murders and with the help of Lois, they manage to find out that Mendenhall is behind everything and stop him before Lois kills Perry as she was brainwashed to do. Mendenhall is arrested and the senior citizens are safe. Lois starts remembering things but not her relationship with Clark and she believes she is in love with Deter.
63	19	"Oedipus Wrecks"	Kenn Fuller	David Simkins	March 24, 1996	16.9
Lois returns to the Daily Planet having regained much of her memories but she still does not remember anything about her relationship with Clark. She still believes that she is in love with Dr. Deter (Larry Poindexter) and when Deter sees signs that she starts remembering, he hypnotizes her into believing that she wants to go away with him. In the meantime, Lois and Clark have to investigate a strange phenomenon happening in Metropolis that makes people act weird. Their investigation leads them to Bad Brain's brother, Herkimer Johnson (Daniel Roebuck), who is willing to do anything to make his mother, Roweena Johnson (Renée Taylor), love him and be proud of him. He created a machine which he calls his Vibro-Whammy (which is the sister machine of Rufus Bad Brain's Elecro-Whammy which was also designed by Herkimer), that produces electromagnetic waves, affecting people's behaviour. While getting saved by Superman at Bad Brain's Mother's house, the last shock of waves from the machine stirs up Lois' memories completely of her relationship to Clark, and the two of them get back together.
64	20	"It's a Small World After All"	Philip Sgriccia	Pat Hazell and Teri Hatcher	April 28, 1996	15.4
Lois has to attend her high school reunion and Clark accompanies her as her fiance. There, Lois learns that two (and later a third one) of her former classmates' spouses have disappeared and she decides to investigate those disappearances to find out what happened. While investigating, something strange starts happening to Clark; he is shrinking. Clark goes to Dr. Klein (Kenneth Kimmins) as Superman, who runs some tests to find out what caused this. The clues that Lois finds lead her to one of her former classmates, Annette Westman (Elizabeth Anne Smith), who has created a shampoo with a secret formula that causes people and things to shrink into miniatures. She wants revenge on all those who mistreated her in school and enjoys seeing them suffer. When Lois confronts her, Annette tries to shrink Lois too but, with the help of Superman, Lois gets away and Annette accidentally pours the entire formula onto herself, causing her to shrink up her own existence. Dr. Klein finds the antidote and everyone returns to their original size.
65	21	"Through a Glass, Darkly"	Chris Long	Chris Ruppenthal	May 5, 1996	16.1
Lois and Clark discuss their wedding and even buying a house together when someone appears and tests Superman's strength, intelligence and morals. Following the clues, Lois and Clark are led to a couple, Zara (Justine Bateman) and Ching (Jon Tenney), who seem to know that Clark is Superman and they do not care that they are sacrificing earth people's lives to do more tests on Superman. When Superman passes the last test, Zara and Ching say that "he is the one" and they fly away to "inform the others" about it. Lois and Clark try to understand who Zara and Ching are and they think that they might not be from Earth since they could fly like Superman. It is revealed that Zara and Ching are from Krypton and they discuss Superman saying that Clark has to leave Earth forever for their people's future and they have to find a way to tell him. While discussing, a male voice tells them that by finding Kal El, they signed his death warrant and the two of them seem scared.
66	22	"Big Girls Don't Fly"	Philip Sgriccia	Eugenie Ross-Leming and Brad Buckner	May 12, 1996	14.8
Zara (Justine Bateman) and Ching (Jon Tenney) inform Clark that many of the Kryptonians had escaped Krypton before the planet blew up and they are all now settled on a new planet they call New Krypton. Zara is Kal-El's wife, having been married to him from birth and the reason she and Ching came to Earth was to find Kal-El and take him back to New Krypton. The ruling families of New Krypton are in conflict and a Civil War is about to start. If Kal-El will not go back, Zara will be forced to marry Lord Nor, an evil Kryptonian who would do anything to rule over the planet. Clark is conflicted if he has to leave Earth and he has to decide, along with Lois, what he should do. He finally decides that he should help his people, even if that means he might never see Lois again, and leaves Earth after making a public statement of why Superman must leave. In the meantime, Lord Nor sends his best assassin, Tez (Roger Daltrey), who can transform into any form he wants, to kill Kal-El before he leaves Earth but he fails—which is unacceptable on his planet and thus he brings his life forces to an end.
