= Lois & Clark: The New Adventures of Superman season 4 =

Lois & Clark: The New Adventures of Superman
- Season 4
- DVD cover
- No. of episodes: 22

Release
- Original network: ABC
- Original release: September 22, 1996 – June 14, 1997

Season chronology
- ← Previous; Season 3

The fourth and final season of Lois & Clark: The New Adventures of Superman originally aired between September 22, 1996 and June 14, 1997, beginning with "Lord of the Flys".

The series loosely follows the philosophy of writer John Byrne, with Clark Kent as the true personality and Superman as a secondary disguise. As the show's title suggests, it focuses as much on Lois Lane and Clark Kent's relationship as it does on the adventures of Clark's alter-ego. The central characters in season 4 are Dean Cain as Clark Kent/Superman, Teri Hatcher as Lois Lane, Lane Smith as Perry White, Eddie Jones as Jonathan Kent, K Callan as Martha Kent, and Justin Whalin as Jimmy Olsen.

The fourth and final season had some multi-part storylines. It began with the resolution of a cliffhanger involving a previously unknown colony of Kryptonians. A villainous conqueror from New Krypton, Lord Nor, takes over Clark's hometown of Smallville. After the conclusion of this story, Lois and Clark finally wed in the third episode of the season entitled "Swear To God, This Time We're Not Kidding". The same week of the airing of this episode, DC Comics released Superman: The Wedding Album, featuring the long-awaited marriage of Lois and Clark/Superman, written and penciled by many of the writers and artists involved with Superman since the 1986 revamp, including some legends from the Silver Age, and an unpublished work of the late Curt Swan.

The series ended on a cliffhanger in which Lois and Clark find an infant in Clark's old bassinet, along with a note that claimed the child belonged to them. This mystery was never resolved in the TV series, but Brad Buckner (executive producer and writer for seasons three and four including the finale) later revealed in an interview that the infant was in fact Kryptonian royalty hidden with Lois and Clark so that they could protect him from assassins.

Earlier in the fourth season, ABC had announced and promised an additional fifth year of the show, so the show's producers and writers were caught unprepared when ABC later changed its mind and decided that no new episodes would be produced. The series had weakened in its Sunday 8:00 timeslot and had been shifted to 7:00 in January, and finally a last-ditch move to Saturdays in the spring. The ratings dropped even further, and the show finished its last season at 104th place. ABC made up for its commitment with Warner Bros. by ordering thirteen episodes of a Debra Messing drama called Prey.

== Episodes ==
No. overall	No. in season	Title	Directed by	Written by	Original release date	U.S. viewers (millions)
67	1	"Lord of the Flys"	Philip Sgriccia	Eugenie Ross-Leming and Brad Buckner	September 22, 1996	12.2
Clark is on his way to New Krypton when he and the Kryptonians find out that Lord Nor (Simon Templeman) has landed on Earth planning to conquer it. Clark heads back to Earth while Lord Nor started his plan from Smallville, making all its people slaves and demands the rest of the world to obey him. Clark and Lois decide to go undercover to Smallville as slaves to find out more about Lord Nor's plans and to help the people. Things seem to go as plan till the moment Lord Nor finds out who Superman's parents are and captures them asking Superman to surrender. Clark shows himself to save his parents asking Lord Nor what he wants and Lord Nor says that he wants Kal-El dead and his throne.
68	2	"Battleground Earth"	Philip Sgriccia	Brad Buckner and Eugenie Ross-Leming	September 29, 1996	13.5
Lord Nor (Simon Templeman) accuses Kal-El of treason and manages to prove that his marriage to Zara (Justine Bateman) was never consummated and the two of them are not planning to fulfill this duty. He claims that Kal plans to instead put a half human breed on the throne. The council tries Kal-El, finds him guilty and sentences him to banishment (a dispersal of his body across the universe). During the execution of the sentence, Nor behaves in a manner revealing his true intentions, forcing Trey (J. G. Hertzler), the tribunal chief, to Kal-El's side. Ching (Mark Kiely) points out that Kal-El was not informed of the Kryptonian trial by combat laws, providing Trey with a legal reason to stop the banishment procedure. While Clark and Lord Nor fight, Lois finds out that a large amount of kryptonite reported missing some time ago has been stolen by the corrupt military colonel Cash, who is planning to kill all the Kryptonians with gas laced with it. Cash does not care if Superman might get injured or die since he sees him as a bigger threat than Lord Nor, and believes that killing everyone is the only way to stop them. They use the kryptonite and manage to kill Lord Nor and his men but Superman survives. Colonel Cash ends up in jail. The Kryptonians leave Earth with Zara being the leader and married to Ching, while Clark stays on Earth with Lois.
69	3	"Swear to God, This Time We're Not Kidding"	Michael Lange	John McNamara	October 6, 1996	14.9
As Lois and Clark prepare for their second wedding, they find themselves pitted against Myrtle Beech (Delta Burke), known as the "Wedding Destroyer" who wants revenge on the two reporters for sending her to prison. She works with her therapist Dr. Voyle Grumman (Charles Fleischer) who amongst other mishaps are involved with the murder of newspaper reporter Leo Nunk (Ray Buktenica). It is later revealed that Grumman lied about Myrtle's fiancé being the perfect husband since he was planning to run off with Myrtle's best friend Emily Channing (Leann Hunley) before his car skidded on ice and flipped into a ditch on the way to the church. Grumman hid the truth from Myrtle because he needed to feel her pain. After Myrtle finds out Grumman's true intentions, they are both arrested with Clark promising her that she will get the help she needs. Lois and Clark finally get married by a guardian angel named Mike (David Doyle). Note: The initial broadcast of this episode coincided with the publication of the comic book Superman: The Wedding Album, wherein Superman/Clark Kent finally marries Lois Lane — 58 years after the characters' debut in Action Comics #1.
70	4	"Soul Mates"	Richard Friedman	Brad Kern	October 13, 1996	12.7
Lois and Clark are ready to consummate their marriage when H.G. Wells (Terry Kiser) appears to inform them that they cannot do it since there is a curse on their love and if they do, Lois will die of a terminal disease after the consummation. The man who is behind the curse is the evil Tempus (Lane Davies) and the only way to lift the curse is for them to travel back in time, to their past lives when the curse was first applied. They first travel back to an era where Tempus is known as Baron Tempos and Clark is Sir Charles, his best knight. Clark does not have his powers but he has a secret identity, the Fox, who steals from the rich and gives to the poor. Lois is Lady Loisette, Baron Tempos' girlfriend but also the Fox's secret lover. Lois and Clark try to break the curse and when they think they did, they get back to Metropolis only to realize that Tempus is a King and about to marry Lois. They travel back in time again with Clark's secret identity being the Lone Rider this time. Tempus blackmails Lois a.k.a. Lulu to marry him otherwise he will kill her parents who as it turns out are actually Martha and Jonathan Kent. The Lone Rider manages to save her parents and Lois does not marry Tempus. The Lone Rider arrests Tempus and hands him over to the sheriff who looks a lot like Jimmy Olsen. Clark and Lois can now return to Metropolis. This time everything is back to normal, Wells leaves and the two of them finally consummate their marriage. Note: Last appearance of Terry Kiser as H.G. Wells.
71	5	"Brutal Youth"	David Grossman	Tim Minear	October 20, 1996	12.7
Lois and Clark return from their honeymoon when an old man shows up at the Daily Planet asking for Jimmy. Before he tells him what he wants, the man drops dead and despite looking over seventy, his identity says that he is in his twenties. Lois and Clark go to Dr. Klein (Kenneth Kimmins) to find out what happened to the man while a prisoner named Conner Shenk (John D'Aquino (young) and Sandy Ward (old)) escapes from prison. Lois finds out that Superman's aging process differs from human people in that it actually stabilises and slows, which means that when she is old, Clark will still be very young, and this news upsets her greatly. In the meantime, Jimmy tries to investigate on his own and gets captured by a scientist named Vita Duetsen (Caroline McWilliams) who is revealed to be behind Shenk's escape and the mystery with the young/old people. Lois and Clark discover her and Superman uses her machine to make Jimmy young again by giving him some of his life years so Jimmy will not die. Duetsen is arrested and Shenk will return to normal soon since he was transformed into a baby and head back to prison. Clark purchases Duetsen's house as Lois says she likes it and he likes it as it has a secret compartment which is difficult to find in that style of building and told her that he gave up a few years of his life to save Jimmy. Note: An artificially-aged Jimmy is portrayed by Jack Larson, who portrayed Jimmy on the Adventures of Superman television series.
72	6	"The People vs. Lois Lane"	Robert Ginty	Grant Rosenberg	October 27, 1996	11.1
Elroy Sykes (Peter Spellos), an ex-informant of Lois, calls her telling her that he has information about a story and asks her to meet him. During their meeting he gives her a gun and asks her to hold it pointing it on him while he starts to describe his "story". The gun goes off killing Sykes and Lois is the only suspect since a woman, Sheila Danko (Kim Tavares), records the whole thing. Lois is arrested and put in jail awaiting her trial. Superman convinces the judge to let her out under his supervision till the trial but Professor Jefferson Cole (Alan Rachins), who is revealed to be behind everything, is determined to ruin Lois' life since she is the one who put him in prison. Jefferson makes a holographic device (The Subliminator) and uses it against Lois. First, a holograph of her walks down the street holding a gun (this leads her back to jail) and later, a holograph of Perry testifies against Lois. Fake Perry's testimony effectively fries Lois and she is found guilty of murder in the first degree and she is placed in prison.
73	7	"Dead Lois Walking"	Chris Long	Brad Buckner and Eugenie Ross-Leming	November 10, 1996	12.2
Lois is in prison on a charge of murder and Superman helps her break out to save her from the death penalty and to help her prove that she is innocent. Lois and Clark go through the names of the people that Lois put in prison to find out which one could want revenge on her and at the same time has the skills to make a holograph device. In the meantime, Jefferson Cole (Alan Rachins) uses a holograph of Superman to steal hybrid kryptonite (which he created while working on "Project K" at StarLabs) from Dr. Klein's (Kenneth Kimmins) lab that will help him destroy the world. Lois and Clark found out the DA was working with Cole the whole time and stole the bullet that killed Elroy Sykes. Lois figures out that if the bullet is still around the DA must have it on him. Luckily for Clark, he managed to get the bullet away from the DA in time. He went as Superman and gave the bullet to Dr Klein to clear Lois Lane. Superman manages to stop him in time, and with the evidence of the stolen bullet that killed Sykes, Lois and Clark prove that Lois was framed by Cole and she was not the one who killed Sykes. Cole is arrested and back in prison and the DA leaves office. Lois is cleared of charges and she and Clark enjoy their first day in their new home as husband and wife.
74	8	"Bob and Carol and Lois and Clark"	Oz Scott	Brian Nelson	November 17, 1996	12.1
Lois and Clark meet a couple, Bob (Antonio Sabàto, Jr.) and Carol (Sydney Walsh), who moved to town and become friends since they have so much in common. In the meantime, Clark investigates a series of murders where all the victims seem to have the same mark on their chest and Lois tries to get an interview with one of the richest men in town, Grant Gendell (Kenneth Mars), who lives isolated. As Clark investigates about Deathstroke, as the assassin was named, he finds out that all the victims are connected with Denzler (Steve Hytner), Gendell's lawyer, and that the man behind the assassin is their new friend, Bob with Carol as his accomplice. Superman rushes to find Lois who is about to meet Denzler and Gendell while Bob and Carol also follow Lois since they want to get revenge on Gendell by killing him and stealing his fortune. Superman fights Deathstroke and Bob and Carol get arrested before they finish their plans.
75	9	"Ghosts"	Robert Ginty	Michael Gleason	November 24, 1996	12.6
A real estate agent named Herbie Saxe (Drew Carey) wants to buy the houses at Lois and Clark's block on behalf of Mink Mahoney (Richard Zavaglia) and to do that, he tries to scare all the residents who do not want to sell by making them believe that their houses are haunted including Lois and Clark. Herbie Saxe is a con man and a criminal who wants to make a fortune off those houses. In his attempt to make Lois and Clark's house look haunted, he accidentally frees the spirit of a previous owner, Katie Banks (Kathy Kinney), of the house that was murdered and trapped in the walls. Herbie uses Katie to scare Lois and Clark by telling her that if she helps him to get his house, he will find out who killed her and that way she will be able to pass to the other side. Katie possesses Lois and when Katie leaves Lois' body, Lois can "see" her pain and that she was murdered. While Lois and Clark try to find out who the murderer is, Katie realizes that Herbie is using her to steal their house and, working on her own now, she wants to take over Lois' life and live with Clark. Clark solves the mystery of the murder of and manages to make Katie face the truth. Now that the murderer was found, Katie can pass to the other side and be free. Herbie and the murderer go to jail.
76	10	"Stop the Presses"	Peter Ellis	Brad Kern	December 8, 1996	12.2
Perry gets a promotion and appoints Lois in his place as the new editor in chief of the Daily Planet. Lois is under pressure in her new position while Clark investigates a story that has to do with the disappearance of a black hat computer hacker, Eric Press (Jeff Juday). When strange things start to happen in Metropolis involving computers, Clark believes that Eric is involved but the lack of evidence leads Lois to kill his story. This leads to their first serious fight and causes troubles to their marriage. It is revealed that behind the hacking is indeed Eric but only because his brother Ethan (Charles Esten) forces him to do it since he wants to get revenge on Superman for killing his "idol", Lex Luthor. Both brothers are die hard Lex Luthor fans and want to get rid of Superman for this. Superman is out to encounter the two brothers while Lois puts the pieces together and realizes that Clark's story was important and that he is in danger. The two brothers block out the yellow sun to prevent Superman from recharging his powers and use a deadly weapon called the A-Tech Quantum Dispander (a new improved version of the Quantum Disrupter, the weapon Lex used to try to kill Superman in Seconds) to kill him. Fortunately Superman gets his powers back and takes them into custody. Clark and Lois get back together and Perry, who is not really satisfied with his new position, asks Lois to run the paper together but Lois declines his offer telling him that she prefers to be a reporter as she has always been.
77	11	"'Twas the Night Before Mxymas"	Mike Vejar	Tim Minear	December 15, 1996	11.1
It is Christmas Eve and Lois and Clark are getting ready for the first Christmas dinner at their home with family and friends but things get weird when an imp from the fifth dimension named Mister Mxyzptlk (Howie Mandel) appears and wants to conquer the Earth by making Superman leave. Mxyzptlk traps Metropolis in a time loop where everyone lives the same day over and over again and no one remembers it except Clark. Clark tries to figure out what is happening and Mxyzptlk tells him that every time people live the same day they lose a little of their hope and when the hope is lost completely, Superman will not be necessary to them. Clark tries to break this loop asking Lois' help for whom it is hard to believe at first what Clark says. Clark manages to rekindle Lois' hope and frees her from the time loop and the two of them work together to free everyone else as well. They give everyone their hope back and trick Mxyzptlk into going back to his own dimension. With the imp gone, the loop is finally broken and everyone celebrates Christmas.
78	12	"Lethal Weapon"	Jim Charleston	Grant Rosenberg	January 5, 1997	8.87
Perry's son, Jerry (André Nemec), gets out of jail with good behavior and Perry tries to rebuild their relationship. Jerry has some red kryptonite that makes Superman unable to control his powers. Superman, not knowing what is going on, tries to find it out with Dr. Klein's (Kenneth Kimmins) help while he stays away from Lois and everyone as much as he can so he will not hurt them. In the meantime, a mad inventor going by the name Mr. Gadget (John Spencer) plans to blow up the buildings of Metropolis unless the government gives him $1 billion. Mr. Gadget finds out about Jerry's possession of red kryptonite and work with him for a high price, otherwise he will kill his father. Jerry hasn't changed at all and starts stealing and he is not a Superman fan. During their attempt to blow up the City Hall, Perry sees Jerry using the kryptonite and talks him out of it. Superman arrests Mr. Gadget and Jerry is also led back to jail for his involvement and the stuff he stole.
79	13	"Sex, Lies and Videotape"	Philip Sgriccia	Andrew Dettman and Daniel Truly	January 19, 1997	9.91
Randy Goode (Jack Wagner) is jealous of Superman and wants to destroy his good image so he will be the next one to win the "Man of the Year" award (that Superman had apparently "stolen" from him the year before), and one of his photographers, Samantha (Downtown Julie Brown), manages to take pictures of Superman in bed with Lois. On her way to print the pictures, the film is destroyed so she is forced to create a "fake" photograph to give to the press. The "fake" photos go public leading to a huge scandal where Superman has an affair with a married woman and people start to lose their faith in him. Clark decides to tell the truth of Superman's real identity to prove that Lois never cheated on him knowing that it may lead to disastrous consequences. Lois does everything she can to find out who is behind this before Superman's press conference, and along with Jimmy's help, they manage to gather evidence that the photos are fake. Superman does not reveal his real identity and Goode and Samantha get arrested.
80	14	"Meet John Doe"	Jim Pohl	Tim Minear	March 2, 1997	7.97
Clark keeps having nightmares about losing Lois seeing her going through a window and being unable to save her. In the meantime, a Utopian citizen named Andrus (William Christopher) comes from the future to take Tempus (Lane Davies) back to Utopia for his trial. Tempus manages to escape Andrus and steals the time travel window to come back to Earth. With a new identity under the name John Doe, he runs for President and manages to win the elections since he uses a subliminal device to control people's minds and make them believe that "John Doe Is A Darn Nice Guy". Lois and Clark are the only ones who know Tempus and who he really is and they try to stop him. Andrus comes back and works with Superman but in their attempt to trap Tempus, Superman is the one who gets trapped in the time travel window and seems lost forever. Since Superman is gone, Utopia does not exist anymore and Andrus also disappears leaving Lois behind not knowing what to do and where Clark is and Tempus being the President Elect of the United States.
81	15	"Lois and Clarks"	Chris Long	Eugenie Ross-Leming and Brad Buckner	March 9, 1997	8.48
Superman is trapped in the time travel window and Lois does not know what to do to bring him back while Tempus (Lane Davies) keeps sending subliminal signals to people to keep supporting him. H.G. Wells (Hamilton Camp) appears and tells Lois that to bring Superman back, they have to know the exact second he got into the window. They have 48 hours to do it, otherwise he will be lost forever. Wells also brings the alternate Superman from the parallel universe to help them till they find the real one. Superman and Lois work together and destroy the subliminal device of Tempus who gets arrested before he manages to release nuclear missiles against other countries. President Garner got his position back as President. Superman explains to everyone who Tempus really is and why everyone was supporting him so blindly. Meanwhile, Tempus' watch helps to find the exact second Clark got into the window since that moment, due to the explosion, his watch broke and stopped. Lois and Wells find their Clark and bring him back while the other Superman goes back to his universe and thanked the other Clark for looking out for everything while the other Clark was stuck in a time portal. Note: Last appearance of Lane Davies as Tempus and Hamilton Camp as H.G. Wells.
82	16	"...aka Superman"	Robert Ginty	Jeff Vlaming	March 16, 1997	8.32
Lois tries to organize a surprise party for Clark's birthday but his schedule as Superman is so overloaded that he is never there. In the meantime, they try to investigate the disappearance of an astronaut, who, as is revealed later, was murdered. Meanwhile, a beautiful woman named Penny Barnes (Kristanna Loken) thinks that Jimmy is Superman and starts a relationship with him. Penny's boss, Garret Grady (Dwight Schultz), wants to activate a powerful satellite weapon system and is the one who is behind the murder of the astronaut since he refused to help him. When Grady finds out that Penny is Superman's girlfriend, he captures her, along with Lois, to force Superman to help him with his plan. Jimmy helps so Lois and Penny get free while Superman destroys Grady's plan and Grady is arrested. Penny realizes that Jimmy is not Superman, but she still loved him, especially when he risked his life to save her. Later Perry, after numerous cancellations, decides to surprise both, Lois and Clark, for Clark's birthday party since it is the only way to actually have a party.
83	17	"Faster than a Speeding Vixen"	Neal Ahern	Brad Kern	April 12, 1997	5.88
Leslie Luckaby (Patrick Cassidy) appears as the new owner of the Daily Planet while a mysterious new woman superhero named "Vixen" (Lori Fetrick) decides to take the law into her own hands by killing the villains of Metropolis instead of arresting them, thus crossing a million lines. Superman tries to find out who she is and where she comes from while CEOs of Luthor's former companies disappear. It is revealed that behind the disappearances is Vixen, who is told to do so by a facially disfigured man who lives hidden under the name Mr. Smith (Keith Brunsmann). Leslie offers himself as bait for Vixen so Superman can capture her. When Vixen kidnaps Leslie, Superman follows her and the two of them fight. During the fight, Vixen is destroyed while Superman finds out that she was not a human but a machine. Lois and Clark want to find out who made her and why while it is revealed that Mr. Smith really works for Leslie who is in fact Lex Luthor's son and wants revenge for his father.
84	18	"Shadow of a Doubt"	Philip Sgriccia	Grant Rosenberg	April 19, 1997	6.16
One by one the people who were involved in Vixen's creation are getting murdered by a man named Hanson who appears to be a shadow and works for Mr. Smith (Keith Brunsmann). Lois and Clark try to solve the mystery while at the same time consider if they can have a kid together. Leslie (Patrick Cassidy) continues his plan of drifting Lois and Clark apart while at the same time trying, along with Mr. Smith, to rebuild Luthor's empire. He sends Lois to a convention and Clark to an exclusive interview while he follows Lois and hits on her causing misunderstandings between the couple. When the shadow attacks Lois, Superman manages to destroy him. Lois and Clark put the pieces together and find out who is behind everything and that his next target is Leslie. Leslie kills the man before Lois and Clark can talk to him claiming that he attacked him first. Lois and Clark put the pieces together, and Lois saw the file that Lex Luthor owned some of the places. Lex showed her his diagram of all his holdings, Clark found out Leslie was the target by the shadow figure and Jimmy got a list of Leslie's holdings were all part of Lex's empire. Lois told Clark the shadow figure said, he will go after the son of the man who knew Superman's identity. Lois and Clark knew Lex had knowledge of Clark's identity and suspect that Leslie is Lex Luthor's son. Later on, Leslie and Mr. Smith hear a recording of Luthor (John Shea's voice) saying that Clark Kent is Superman. Note: John Shea returned as the voice of Lex Luthor.
85	19	"Voice from the Past"	David Grossman	John McNamara	April 26, 1997	6.35
Lois and Clark know that Leslie (Patrick Cassidy) is in reality Lex Luthor's son and Leslie, to prove them that he is not like his father, reveals to everyone who he is and that he will try to fix everything his father destroyed. It is revealed that the real Lex Luthor Jr. is in fact the man who appears as Mr. Smith (Keith Brunsmann). Lex Jr. is in love with Lois and wants to separate her from Clark. He makes a device with which he controls Lois' head and causes her pain if she does not do whatever he asks. Lois leaves Clark and asks him for a divorce while at the same time leaving him a note that she is in danger. Lois is kidnapped by Lex Jr., who tries to make her love him, while Superman is searching for her. He finds them and when Lex Jr. tells him what he wants from him, Superman freezes Lois making her look dead. Leslie helps Superman to save Lois while he and Lex Jr. stay behind and get killed by the bomb that goes off. In the midst of all this, Superman tries to find out, with Dr. Klein's (Kenneth Kimmins) help, if he can have kids. Note: John Shea makes an uncredited appearance as the voice of Lex Luthor in the episode recap. This is his final ever appearance of the role in any form.
86	20	"I've Got You Under My Skin"	Eugenie Ross-Leming	Tim Minear	May 31, 1997	4.82
Woody Sams (Tim Thomerson) wants to get a contract taken off of him by the mob and to do that he plans to switch bodies with Clark since he cannot meet Little Tony (Howard George). Clark waits for Little Tony for a story when Woody comes and uses a crystal to transfer himself into Clark's body who has no idea what happened. Clark is now trapped in Woody's body and tries to convince Lois who he really is while Woody finds out that he is now Superman. Clark tries to get his body back but Woody does not want to switch back and to make sure that he will stay forever in Superman's body he has to kill Clark while being in Woody's body. Meanwhile, Little Tony's men see Clark and thinking that he is Woody, they kidnap him along with Becky (Staci Keanan), Woody's daughter. Becky and Clark are in danger and when Woody hears Becky's screams, runs to save her but he is afraid to get into the fire since the switch of the bodies made Superman's body vulnerable. To save Becky, he switches back with Clark. Superman saves Becky but Woody gets shot by Little Tony and dies. Little Tony and his posse are arrested. Before he dies, Little Tony's dog touches the crystal Woody is holding and Woody switches bodies with the dog. Clark reunites with Lois. Note: Last appearance of Shaun Toub as Asabi.
87	21	"Toy Story"	Jim Pohl	Brad Kern	June 7, 1997	4.41
Harold Kripstly (Grant Shaud), a toy inventor, gets fired because of an invention he wanted to make called a re-integrator. At the same time, orphan kids are being kidnapped and Lois and Clark try to find out who is behind the kidnappings. When children of the members of the company Kripstly used to work start to disappear, their investigation leads them to him. In an attempt to kidnap one more child using his invention, Kripstly kidnaps Lois instead. Superman, with Lois and Dr. Klein's (Kenneth Kimmins) help, finds out where Kripstly is hiding and saves Lois, Dr. Klein and the kids. Kripstly is arrested and the kids return to the orphanage and their parents. Meanwhile, Perry puts a personal ad in the "Lonely Hearts" column of the newspaper and has a date with an unknown woman. When the woman comes on their date it is revealed that she is his ex wife Alice (Mary Frann) and the two of them decide to give a second chance to their relationship. Note: Last appearance of Lane Smith as Perry White and Kenneth Kimmins as Dr. Bernard Klein.
88	22	"The Family Hour"	Robert Ginty	Brad Buckner and Eugenie Ross-Leming	June 14, 1997	4.88
Lois and Clark find out that they cannot have a kid together and they are devastated. They decide to ask Lois' father, Sam (Harve Presnell), for help but they know they will have to tell him that Clark is Superman. Sam is shocked by the news but he promises to see if he can help them while at the same time everyone is trying to keep the secret from Ellen (Beverly Garland). In the meantime, Dr. Klaus "Fat Head" Mensa (Harry Anderson) is released from prison where he developed mind-control powers. He now wants revenge on his former colleagues for not helping him. He uses his telekinetic powers to kill one of them. Threatened by Mensa, Sam's current partner, Misha (Brian George), forces Sam to reveal Superman's identity. When Mensa is about to kill Misha, Misha reveals Superman's identity to Mensa. Mensa kidnaps Clark's and Lois' parents and threatens to kill them if Superman tries to stop him from stealing the bank gold. Misha is guarding the parents, but he decides to help them and does not follow Mensa's orders. Superman stops the bank robbery, but Mensa escapes. Mensa orders Misha to hook him up the "Bummer-Be-Gone" invention, believing it to increase his abilities, but it takes his telekinetic powers away while also erasing the knowledge that Clark is Superman away from Sam, Ellen and Misha. The episode - and series - ends with someone, unseen and unknown, who seems to know Clark's secret identity, leaving a baby in the bassinet in the living room with the Superman emblem as a blanket over the child and a note too, saying that the child belongs to them. After 6 months of marriage, they finally have the child they've always wanted and both sets of grandparents are happy too. Note: Last appearance of Dean Cain as Clark Kent/Kal-El/Superman, Teri Hatcher as Lois Lane, Justin Whalin as Jimmy Olsen, Eddie Jones as Jonathan Kent, K Callan as Martha Kent, Harve Presnell as Sam Lane, Beverly Garland as Ellen Lane.
