= The Family Hour =

The Family Hour may refer to:

- "The Family Hour" (Law & Order)
- "The Family Hour" (Lois & Clark: The New Adventures of Superman)
