= Lois & Clark: The New Adventures of Superman season 1 =

Season 1 of Lois & Clark: The New Adventures of Superman

Lois & Clark: The New Adventures of Superman
- Season 1
- DVD cover
- No. of episodes: 21

Release
- Original network: ABC
- Original release: September 12, 1993 – May 8, 1994

Season chronology
- Next → Season 2

The first season of Lois & Clark: The New Adventures of Superman originally aired between September 12, 1993 and May 8, 1994, beginning with "Pilot". The series loosely follows writer John Byrne's concept of Clark Kent as the true personality and Superman as a secondary disguise. As the show's title suggests, it focuses on the relationship between Clark Kent and Lois Lane. The central characters in season one are Dean Cain as Clark Kent (Superman), Teri Hatcher as Lois Lane, Lane Smith as Perry White, Eddie Jones as Jonathan Kent, K Callan as Martha Kent, Michael Landes as Jimmy Olsen, Tracy Scoggins as Cat Grant, and John Shea as Lex Luthor.

The first season was moderately successful, earning the cast (especially Hatcher and Cain) critical praise for their performances. Lane Smith was popular, breathing life and humor into Daily Planet editor-in-chief Perry White. John Shea was praised for his portrayal of Lex Luthor. Michael Landes' modern-day take on Jimmy Olsen attracted a cult following, as did Tracy Scoggins' comedic portrayal of Cat Grant, a more recent addition to the Superman mythos. Lex Luthor was killed off in the season finale after a disagreement between Shea and the producers about the actor's commute between New York and Los Angeles. He then reappeared only sporadically: once in season two, twice in season three, and once in season four.

== Episodes ==
No. overall	No. in season	Title	Directed by	Written by	Original release date	U.S. viewers (millions)
1	1	"Pilot"	Robert Butler	Deborah Joy LeVine	September 12, 1993	18.3
2	2	"Pilot"	Robert Butler	Deborah Joy LeVine	September 12, 1993	18.3
Clark, in Metropolis, goes to the Daily Planet for a job interview and starts his career as a metropolitan newspaper reporter. Lois and Clark investigate a spaceship launch. Dr. Samuel Platt (Kenneth Tigar) is murdered; Dr. Antoinette Baines (Kim Johnston Ulrich) calls Platt untrustworthy and says that the spaceship is all right. She conspires with billionaire industrialist Lex Luthor to sabotage the launch, and Lois returns with Jimmy to check on her. Baines imprisons them, and Clark searches for them but cannot use his powers. She sets up an accident to kill them, but Clark frees himself and saves Lois and Jimmy. Luthor booby-traps Baines' helicopter, which explodes and kills her. The spaceship is prepared for launch; Lois sneaks aboard while Clark visits his parents and asks Martha to make him a costume for an alternate identity. Clark, Martha, and Jonathan watch the launch and, when they see that something is wrong, Clark flies to Metropolis. He finds Lois trying to defuse a bomb, and swallows it in front of her. Dubbed "Superman" after the "S" on his costume, Clark confronts Luthor, revealing that he knows the apparently benign businessman is a megalomaniac. He vows to see Luthor face justice, and Luthor replies, "As they say, let the games begin".
3	3	"Strange Visitor (From Another Planet)"	Randall Zisk	Bryce Zabel	September 26, 1993	16.3
Jason Trask (Terence Knox), who says that he works for the government, wants to ask Lois and Clark about Superman. Trask does not find the information he wants, and leaves. Perry learns that Trask's warrant was fake, and Lois and Clark begin an investigation. George Thompson (Joseph Campanella), who works for the government, denies knowing anything about Trask. Lois follows him to a secret warehouse and, when Thompson is found dead, returns with Clark. They find strange objects apparently connected to Superman, including a spaceship and a ball that shines when Clark touches it (revealing where he is from). Trask captures them; a xenophobic human supremacist, he tries to kill Superman by throwing him and Lois out of a plane. Superman saves her, and Trask disappears. Lois and Clark return to the now-empty warehouse with Perry and the police. Superman reveals to Lois that he is from the planet Krypton, and wants to help Earth with truth and justice.
4	4	"Neverending Battle"	Gene Reynolds	Daniel Levine	October 3, 1993	16.4
Perry wants to know everything about Superman so the Daily Planet will have an exclusive story about him. Lois becomes obsessed with Superman and tries everything to obtain the story. When she steals a story from Clark and Jimmy's idea about how she can find Superman, Clark pulls an office prank on Lois by sending her a misleading letter about the location of Superman's spaceship. Lex Luthor wants to know how strong and fast Superman is, and he creates tests for him. Clark puts the pieces together, and tells Luthor to stop the tests. Luthor tells Clark that he cannot be at two places at once; if Superman is in Metropolis, other people will be in danger. Clark retires as Superman before a conversation with Lois encourages him to bring Superman back, and he moves into a new apartment.
5	5	"I'm Looking Through You"	Mark Sobel	Deborah Joy LeVine	October 10, 1993	19.3
Scientist Alan Morris (Leslie Jordan) invents a suit that makes him invisible, using it to rob from the rich and give to the poor as a modern Robin Hood. When thieves steal his back-up suits and use them to rob banks, Alan goes to Lois and Clark. Working together, they capture the bank robbers and hand them over to the police. Clark, overwhelmed with the adulation for Superman by the people of Metropolis, begins having nightmares; people sell items with his logo on them, and the mayor gives him the key to the city. Even Lois makes Clark feel invisible to her compared with Superman, and he does not know how to react.
6	6	"Requiem for a Super Hero"	Randall Zisk	Robert Killbrew	October 17, 1993	19.0
Lois and Clark cover a story about boxers who seem to be stronger than normal humans. Lois asks family friend Allie Dinello (John LaMotta) for information, but he declines to say anything. When he later calls Lois and asks her to meet him, Allie is murdered before he talks to her. Lois and Clark's investigation leads them to Lois' father, Dr. Sam Lane (Denis Arndt) – a sports-medicine physician – and the discovery that the fighters are cyborgs. Sam decides to help Lois when he finds out that his partner, Max (Matt Roe), killed Allie. Max works for Lex Luthor, who wants to build an army of Supermen. He kidnaps Lois and, while Superman fights the cyborgs, Lex saves her life by killing Max. Lois and Clark write the story revealing the truth about the fighters.
7	7	"I've Got a Crush on You"	Gene Reynolds	Thania St. John	October 24, 1993	17.4
The Toasters, a group of arsonists, sets local nightclubs on fire and Lois goes undercover at a club to investigate. Clark gets an undercover job at the club as a bartender. Johnny Taylor (Michael Milhoan) owns the club, but his sister Toni (Jessica Tuck) disagrees with the way he runs it and takes over after it is attacked by the arsonists. Lex Luthor meets with Toni at the club and sees Lois singing on stage. Toni finds Lois and Clark and Clark, to save his cover, outs Lois. Lois loses her job, but follows Toni and learns that she is behind the Toasters. She asks them to stop but the Toasters turn on her, saying that they are tired of being low-level punks and want to make their mark on the underworld. When Toni threatens them with her gang, they say that they will recruit other punks and raise their own army. Superman uses his freeze breath to stop the Toasters. Lex took advantage of the Toasters, wanting to build Lex Harbor, and steals their advanced incendiary weapons.
8	8	"Smart Kids"	Robert Singer	Daniel Levine	October 31, 1993	17.6
Four children who seem bright for their age escape from an orphanage and take over the city. At the orphanage, Dr. Carlton (Michael Cavanaugh) searches for them. Lois and Clark try to learn where the children are and why they are so intelligent. When Amy Valdez (Courtney Peldon), returns to the orphanage to get her sister, she is captured and Lois becomes her temporary foster parent. Amy tells her about Metamide 5, a potion Dr. Carlton gave them to make them smart; when it is discontinued, the effect disappears. The other children learn that Clark is Superman, but he tries to convince them that he is not. Lex works with Carlton, but when they disagree, he gives him Metamide 6 and it burns Carlton's brain. Lois and Clark convince Amy that her friends are in danger, and she leads them to their hideout. They convince the children that being a normal kid is the right way to live their childhood and they return to the orphanage, where they are safe again. The children hint to Clark that they knew that he was lying, but keep his secret out of gratitude.
9	9	"The Green, Green Glow of Home"	Les Landau	Bryce Zabel	November 14, 1993	15.2
Kent neighbor Wayne Irig (Jerry Hardin) finds a glowing meteorite and sends a sample to a laboratory for analysis. His farm is seized to investigate environmental violations, and Wayne gives the meteorite to Martha and Jonathan for safekeeping. Perry sends Lois and Clark to Smallville to investigate. Jonathan shows Clark the meteorite, which weakens him; Clark hopes the effect is permanent, so he can have a normal life, yet Jonathan refuses of Clark denying who he is for happiness and wants to destroy it. Wayne disappears, and Lois and Clark learn that Jason Trask is looking for the meteorite to kill Superman. Trask kidnaps Clark's parents and threatens to kill them if Clark does not tell him where Superman is. Clark admits that he is Superman, but Trask does not believe him. Clark regains his powers and saves his parents. Trask tries to kill him with the meteorite; Clark destroys it, but loses his powers again. They fight and Trask is killed by Clark's high-school friend, Sheriff Rachel Harris (Joleen Lutz) before he can kill Clark. His powers return, and he is glad he still had courage. Lois writes the story, detailing Trask's hatred of Superman. She initially names the meteorite kryptonium, but Clark suggests kryptonite instead.
10	10	"The Man of Steel Bars"	Robert Butler	Paris Qualles	November 21, 1993	18.6
A winter heat wave causes the citizens of Metropolis to blame Superman, after scientists theorize that his drawing on the sun's powers is to blame. Superman promises to stop using his powers, but when people's lives are in danger he breaks his promise and is arrested. He later promises to leave town, but Lois learns the truth. She and Dr. Katherine Goodman (Elaine Kagan) learn that a nuclear-power plant owned by Lex Luthor is behind the heat wave because of a leaking reactor, and ask Superman to return and help them prevent a nuclear meltdown. After Superman averts the disaster he dismantles the plant, realizing that Luthor deliberately heated the reactor's core in a frameup. Superman lacks evidence, and Luthor pays fines to the city and the United States Environmental Protection Agency and escapes justice. Guest star: Sonny Bono as Mayor Frank Berkowitz
11	11	"Pheromone, My Lovely"	Bill D'Elia	Deborah Joy LeVine	November 28, 1993	20.0
Lex Luthor reduces funding for Miranda's (Morgan Fairchild) research; she is a chemist who is his ex-lover. To prove that he is wrong and her research is valid, she sprays the Daily Planet staff with her "Revenge" perfume formula; it has a chemical which removes sexual inhibition. The staff begins acting strangely, but Clark is unaffected. Lois pursues him as he tries to learn what happened. When the chemical wears off, Lois and Clark discover that Miranda's perfume contains specific pheromones. Miranda plans to spray the whole town with an advanced formula of the perfume which will cause permanent damage. Lex (who believes that Miranda will carry out her threat) asks Superman's help to stop her, which he does in time.
12	12	"Honeymoon in Metropolis"	James A. Contner	Daniel Levine	December 12, 1993	16.9
Lois takes a weekend off from work to relax, and books the honeymoon suite at the Lexor Hotel. She witnesses Congressman Ian Harrington (Charles Frank) possibly making a deal across the street about Shock Wave, a top-secret government project, with arms dealer Thaddeus Roarke (Charles Cyphers). She takes photos of the men exchanging money, and when she returns to the Daily Planet she asks Perry to let her return and investigate. Perry agrees, deciding to send Clark so they can pose as a newlywed couple and observe the two men. Lois and Clark learn what it is like to live with someone else and discover that Roarke plans to sabotage a navy weapons test, endangering the lives of millions of people. Superman stops the disaster and saves Metropolis; Roarke is arrested, and Harrington says that he set up a sting operation to put him behind bars.
13	13	"All Shook Up"	Felix Enriquez Alcala	Bryce Zabel and Jackson Gillis	January 2, 1994	18.9
An asteroid hurtles toward Earth, and the government asks for Superman's help to stop it. Before he leaves, Lois kisses him passionately. Superman flies into space and strikes the asteroid; this makes it smaller, but the impact causes him to lose his memory. He flies back to Earth, not remembering that he is Superman. Cat Grant, a beautiful girl who is in love with him, uses this opportunity to tell him that they are together. Lois tries to help Clark remember, while no one knows if Superman survived the impact with the asteroid. Martha and Jonathan arrive in Metropolis and try to help Clark regain his memory so he can become Superman again and stop the asteroid fragment still heading to Earth. After several attempts, Clark remembers and flies into space again to stop the asteroid fragment. Note: This is a remake of a classic Adventures of Superman episode, "Panic in the Sky".
14	14	"Witness"	Mel Damski	Bradley Moore	January 9, 1994	19.1
Lois interviews eccentric scientist Vincent Winninger (Elliott Gould). During the interview, she witnesses his murder and learns about a conspiracy that will destroy the environment. Lois publishes the story and becomes a target for the people who murdered Winninger, since they have to eliminate everyone who knows. Perry and Clark try to protect Lois from the killer while they work together to find out who is behind the murder. When they learn that the murderer is Sebastian Finn (William Mesnik) – also known as Mr. Makeup, who can transform into anyone he wants – Lois is frightened. With Superman's help they find and arrest Finn and Barbara Trevino (Claudette Nevins), the woman who asked Finn to kill Winninger and tried to kill Lois after Finn was arrested.
15	15	"Illusions of Grandeur"	Michael W. Watkins	Thania St. John	January 23, 1994	22.3
Nick (Jarrett Lennon) is kidnapped. When his mother Rose (Eve Plumb) reaches out to Lois and Clark for help, they begin to investigate other recent kidnappings of children. The way Nick was kidnapped – through a magic box decorated with the moon and stars – leads them to a magic club where they meet magician Andre Novak (Ben Vereen). While they are searching for clues to connect Novak to the kidnappings, Superman confronts the kidnapper during the ransom exchange for Nick. The kidnapper hypnotizes him into thinking that wrong is right, and Superman begins doing strange things every time he hears the phrase "the moon and the stars". Lois eventually finds Nick; when Superman arrives to help, they learn that Constance (Marietta DePrima) – the assistant of Darrin Romick (Penn Jillette), another magician who works with Novak – is behind the kidnappings. Constance also hypnotized Romick into killing Novak. Superman fights the hypnosis, saves everyone, and Constance is arrested.
16	16	"The Ides of Metropolis"	Philip Sgriccia	Deborah Joy LeVine	February 6, 1994	17.7
Lois follows the trial of Eugene Laderman (Todd Susman), who she believes is innocent despite his conviction for killing Henry Harrison (Paul Gleason): the husband of Eugene's lover and Lex Luthor's former employee, Lena (Jennifer Savidge). Eugene escapes and hides in Lois' apartment while Lois tries to prove his innocence. Lois and Clark's investigation leads them to discover that Lena is acting strangely after the conviction. A virus, "The Ides of Metropolis" (on which Henry was working), takes over all the computers in the country and Eugene is the only one who can find the antidote for it. With Superman's help, they stop the virus before it is too late. While Superman and Eugene work on the antidote, Lois and Detective Reed (Melanie Mayron) learn that Henry is not dead and he and Lena are behind the virus. Reed arrests Henry and Lena, but Lex steals the virus from them. Jonathan arrives at Clark's house, believing that Martha is having an affair.
17	17	"The Foundling"	Bill D'Elia	Daniel Levine	February 20, 1994	14.2
Clark learns that the globe on his spaceship is a projector of messages from his father, Jor-El (David Warner), who tries to explain why he and his mother Lara (Eliza Roberts) had to send him to Earth and that his birth name is Kal-El. Clark sees one message before his apartment is robbed by a kid named Jack (Chris Demetral). He steals Clark's things, including the globe, and sells the globe to two strangers: Lex Luthor and his assistant, Nigel. Clark tries to retrieve the globe and finds Jack with the help of Lois' friend, Louie (Robert Costanzo). Luthor sees the messages on the globe while Clark sees them from a different location. Lois is upset with Clark because he lied to her about the globe. Superman finds it, but cannot learn who bought it. Clark learns that he was not abandoned by Jor-El and Lara; their planet (Krypton) was destroyed, and the only person they could save was him. Lois forgives Clark for lying to her, since she would do what he did if she found the globe. Learning that Superman arrived on Earth as an infant, Luthor realizes that he has a human secret identity.
18	18	"The Rival"	Michael W. Watkins	Tony Blake and Paul Jackson	February 27, 1994	19.8
Linda King (Nancy Everhard), Lois' old rival, arrives in town to work for the Metropolis Star and Preston Carpenter (Dean Stockwell). She seems to be getting all the scoops, giving her newspaper exclusive stories. Lois is furious with Linda because of their history, her scoops, and her flirtation with Clark. Clark leaves the Daily Planet to be partnered with Linda and work for the Metropolis Star. Linda's being in the right place at the right time to get the scoops makes him suspicious, and Perry agrees to let him work undercover at the Metropolis Star. Lois finds out, and she and Clark learn that the accidents are not accidents; Preston is staging them so his newspaper has the exclusives. They talk to Linda, who helps them find proof; with Superman's help, Preston is arrested. Cameo appearance: Bo Jackson as himself
19	19	"Vatman"	Randall Zisk	Deborah Joy LeVine	March 13, 1994	19.7
While Clark is at the Daily Planet, a new Superman saves a crippled jet in Paris and Clark watches the story on TV in shock. Clark wonders if he has a twin brother, but the new Superman is a clone created by Lex Luthor to kill him. Lois approaches the clone and realizes that he is not the Superman she knows. Clark talks to the clone, who thinks that they are enemies. Superman asks questions about the clone's childhood, and Luthor tells him he must kill Superman as soon as possible because he is dying. The clone and Superman confront each other, and the clone tells him the truth. Before he dies, he gives Superman the lock of hair that Luthor used to clone him to destroy and warns him that his creator might try it again.
20	20	"Fly Hard"	Philip Sgriccia	Thania St. John	March 27, 1994	17.0
Clark, Perry, Jimmy and Jack are at the Daily Planet on a Saturday afternoon. Perry and Jimmy try to clean up Perry's office while Jack waits for Clark to finish a story and go to the movies. Lois and Lex arrive because Lois wanted to make a last-minute change to her article before they head out. They are taken hostage when a group of criminals bursts into the office. Jimmy escapes and tries to get help, and the rest of the hostages try to understand what the criminals want. Clark finds it difficult to use his powers, not wanting to endanger everyone. Lois helps them discover that the criminals are looking for a safe belonging to Dragonetti, a Prohibition-era racketeer. Their boss Willie (Macon McCalman) gave them information about the safe because Dragonetti framed him and the safe would exonerate him. When it is found, the criminals turn against Willie and try to run away with it. Clark surreptitiously uses his powers, the criminals are arrested, and Willie is cleared.
21	21	"Barbarians at the Planet"	James Bagdonas	Daniel Levine and Deborah Joy LeVine	May 1, 1994	13.8
Part 1 of 2. Lex proposes to Lois, who tells him she needs time to decide. To force her to accept his proposal, he buys the Daily Planet to save it from closing. Lex hires Chip (a young man) as Perry's boss, and Perry quits. Lex and Mrs Cox frame Jack when Lex plants a bomb which destroys the newspaper. Lex says that it is impossible to rebuild the newspaper, and gives Lois a television job at LexTel Communications. Perry retires, and Clark and Jimmy are unemployed. Lois tells Clark about Lex's proposal, angering him for considering it. To stop her from marrying Lex, Clark confesses his love for her and tries to make her see that Lex is not who he seems to be. Lois tells him that she loves him as a friend, later confessing her love to Superman. When Superman makes it clear that they will never be together, Lois accepts Lex's proposal.
22	22	"The House of Luthor"	Alan J. Levi	Daniel Levine	May 8, 1994	17.0
Part 2 of 2. Lois prepares for her wedding to Lex while Clark, Perry, Jimmy and Jack (who escaped from prison) try to discover who is behind the bombing of the Daily Planet. Their clues lead them to Lex, but they do not have proof. They eventually find enough evidence to put Lex behind bars, and Jack is cleared. In the meantime, Lex finds the last piece of kryptonite and traps Superman in a kryptonited cage before the wedding. Lois decides at the last minute that she cannot marry Lex, and Perry arrives with the police to stop the wedding and arrest Lex; Mrs Cox is already arrested. Lex jumps off Luthor Tower, Metropolis' tallest building, to avoid jail. Superman, who escaped the cage, tries to rescue Lex but is too weak. Franklin Stern (James Earl Jones) reconsiders Perry's proposal to buy the Daily Planet and rebuild it. Lois is determined to confess her love to Clark, who says that he was lying when he told her that he loved her romantically and did it to keep her from marrying Lex.
