= Oedipus Wrecks =

Oedipus Wrecks may refer to:

- Oedipus Wrecks (Lois & Clark), an episode in the 3rd season of the television series Lois & Clark: The New Adventures of Superman
- Oedipus Wrecks, one of the three short stories in the film New York Stories

== See also ==
- Oedipus Complex
