= Lois & Clark: The New Adventures of Superman =

American television series (1993–1997)

- Also known as: The New Adventures of Superman
- Genre: Action-adventure; Comedy-drama; Romance; Superhero
- Based on: Superman by: Jerry Siegel; Joe Shuster
- Developed by: Deborah Joy LeVine
- Starring: Dean Cain; Teri Hatcher; Lane Smith; Eddie Jones; K Callan; Michael Landes; Justin Whalin; Tracy Scoggins; John Shea
- Composer: Jay Gruska
- Country of origin: United States
- Original language: English
- No. of seasons: 4
- No. of episodes: 88 (list of episodes)

Production
- Executive producers: Deborah Joy LeVine; Robert Singer; Eugenie Ross Leming; Brad Buckner; David Jacobs; Robert Butler
- Running time: 42–47 minutes; 93 minutes ("Pilot")
- Production companies: Gangbuster Films Inc. ("Pilot"); Roundelay Productions; December 3rd Productions; Warner Bros. Television

Original release
- Network: ABC
- Release: September 12, 1993 – June 14, 1997

Lois & Clark: The New Adventures of Superman is an American superhero television series based on the DC Comics character Superman created by Jerry Siegel and Joe Shuster. It stars Dean Cain as Clark Kent / Superman and Teri Hatcher as Lois Lane. The series aired on ABC from September 12, 1993, to June 14, 1997.

Developed for television by Deborah Joy LeVine, the series loosely followed the modern origin of Superman, established by writer John Byrne, in which Clark Kent is the true personality and Superman a disguise. The series focuses on the relationship and romance between Lois and Clark as much as the adventures of Clark's alter ego, Superman.

== Premise ==
On May 17, 1966, Jonathan and Martha Kent witness the crash-landing of a small spaceship in Shuster's Field outside of Smallville, Kansas. They discover the baby Kal-El inside and raise him as their own, naming him Clark Jerome Kent.

The series opens in 1993, on the day that the 27-year-old Clark moves to Metropolis after leaving his position as a newspaper editor of Smallville Press and interviews for a job at the Daily Planet under editor Perry White. Clark becomes acquainted with photographer Jimmy Olsen and gossip columnist Cat Grant. Metropolis is a much more vibrant place than Smallville, but also more dangerous, and Clark becomes concerned at the difficulty of using his superhuman powers to help people without exposing his extraterrestrial nature and therefore ruining all chance for a normal life. His solution is to wear a costume, enabling him to use his powers freely in an alternate identity. He also frequently has to find a way to use his powers in secret, without the opportunity to discreetly change into costume.

Soon after being hired at The Daily Planet, Clark is partnered with star reporter Lois Lane. Clark falls in love with Lois, but she instead becomes infatuated with Clark's alter ego, naming him Superman, while initially dismissing Clark as a dimwitted and sentimental hick. Where Clark excels at reporting human interest stories, Lois specializes in exposing political scandals and criminal operations, leading to her frequently ending up in perilous situations from which Superman must rescue her. In time, Clark earns Lois's respect after she sees his intelligence and competency as a reporter alongside his virtues, and they become friends.

A hologram-projecting globe later reveals to Clark that he was not abandoned by his biological parents, but that they sent him to Earth in order to save him from the destruction of his home planet, which his parents were unable to escape.

Superman's mission interferes with the illegal dealings of Lex Luthor, a Metropolis business giant and philanthropist. Superman alone knows of Lex's evil nature, and Luthor perceives Superman as a worthy opponent and a relief from his ennui.

== Production ==
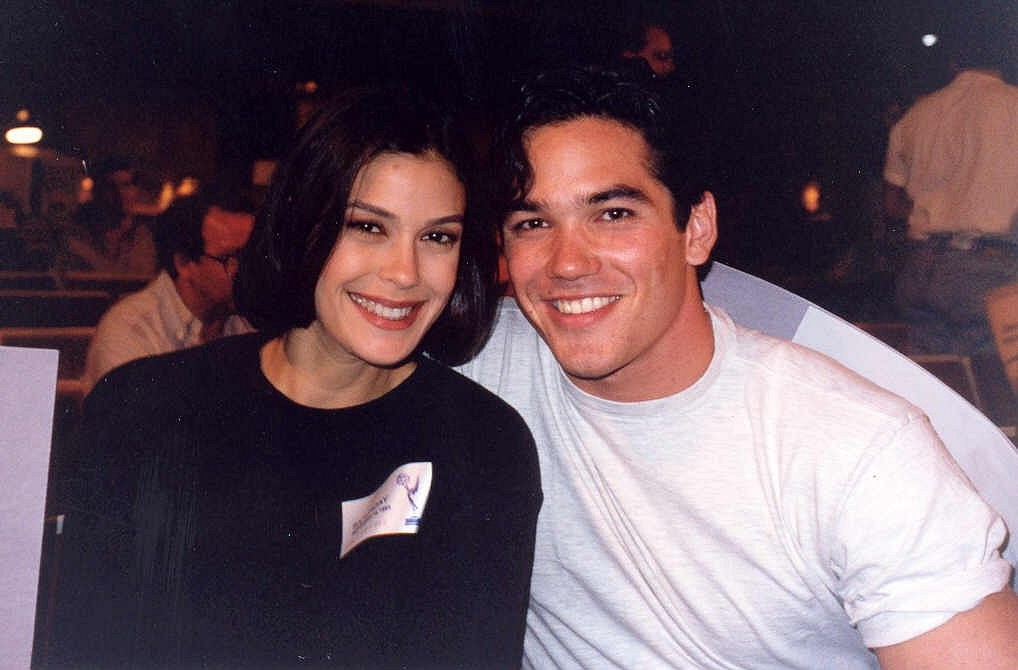
Teri Hatcher and Dean Cain

DC Comics president Jenette Kahn had been working for several years to sell the concept of a Superman television series, with the title "Lois Lane's Daily Planet". In 1991 Leslie Moonves and Deborah Joy LeVine helped sell the series to ABC television network with a new title, Lois and Clark: The New Adventures of Superman. LeVine had never read a comic book before and was more interested in pursuing a romantic comedy angle than the superhero themes. One executive described the series as “aimed at women; not aimed at comic book fans.”

A few episodes directly emphasized that Clark was the dominant personality, not Superman. Unique to the series was the depiction of Clark Kent and Superman's traditional hairstyles being reversed—in this series, it is Superman whose hair is slicked back and Clark whose fringe falls more naturally. An additional element that reflected the post-Byrne comics was the portrayal of Lex Luthor as a corrupt corporate tycoon rather than the traditional mad scientist.

The illusion of Superman flying was accomplished by suspending actor Dean Cain with a flight harness and wires which were erased from the shots in post-production; anyone Cain was carrying was independently wired.

The sets were designed to have a timeless appearance, such that the show could seem to be taking place in the 1950s or the near future and not become dated in later years.

=== Casting ===
Initially, LeVine so strongly felt that Dean Cain was too young for the part of Clark Kent/Superman that after Cain finished his audition and left the room, she snapped at the casting director, "We're casting Superman, not Superboy!" However, after auditioning over a hundred prospects with none of them standing out as perfect for the role, Cain was included among the handful who got a callback for the part. Kevin Sorbo was the runner up for the part and was nearly cast in the role until the producers changed their minds and went with Cain. Levine said what ultimately won Cain the role was his reading for the scene where Clark talks with Jonathan Kent about feeling he does not fit in.

After Lane Smith was cast for the part of Perry White, LeVine decided to replace the character's catchphrase from the comics with "Great shades of Elvis!", since she thought it implausible that a Southerner would ever say "Great Caesar’s ghost!". This led to Perry being portrayed as a consummate Elvis Presley fan.

John Shea was chosen for the part of Lex Luthor because he had the looks and charm of a romantic leading man; LeVine wanted a Lex Luthor who could serve as a romantic rival for Superman.

K Callan distinguished herself from the other actresses auditioning to play Martha Kent by wearing a pink track suit. Whereas the other actresses presented themselves as stereotypical farmers, Callan understood that the show's producers were looking for a modernized Martha Kent.

== Series history ==
Season	Episodes	Originally released	
Season	Episodes	First released	Last released
1	22	September 12, 1993	May 8, 1994
2	22	September 18, 1994	May 21, 1995
3	22	September 17, 1995	May 12, 1996
4	22	September 22, 1996	June 14, 1997

=== Season 1 (1993–1994) ===
John Shea as Lex Luthor.

Teri Hatcher and Dean Cain received critical praise for their performances. The scene in the pilot in which Clark walks up a wall was accomplished with a special rotating room, which required Cain to time his approach to the wall to coincide with the room rotating to leave the wall on the bottom.

Lex develops an interest in Lois Lane and through most of the season tries to woo her. Although Lois is receptive to his romantic advances, she remains infatuated with Superman. Lois also develops feelings for Clark, but represses or denies them. Lex orchestrates multiple illegal schemes to acquire profit and power, in most cases with even Superman never realizing his involvement, and unable to prove that involvement in those cases where he is aware of it.

In the episode "The Green, Green Glow of Home", the Kents' neighbor Wayne Irig unearths a large chunk of kryptonite near the landing site of Clark's spaceship and sends a small sample of it to a lab for analysis. Clark destroys the large chunk in the same episode, but this exposes Superman's critical weakness, and the small sample is stolen and would pass from one set of wrong hands to another throughout the series.

The season concludes with a two-part story in which Lex's criminal activities are publicly exposed and he commits suicide to escape justice.

Lois & Clark was second in its time slot during the fall (behind Murder, She Wrote) and scored high with adults ages 18 to 49, a key demograph for which advertisers pay a premium, but finished at No. 65 out of 132 prime-time programs. ABC considered this an overall disappointing performance, though they approved a full second season in hopes that the changes being made to the production staff would yield an increase in ratings.

=== Season 2 (1994–1995) ===
In season two, the character of Cat Grant was dropped, Lex Luthor was eliminated from the main cast and became an occasional guest character, and Michael Landes was replaced with Justin Whalin as Jimmy Olsen. The Olsen role was recast because the show's new producers felt that Landes was too similar to Dean Cain in age and type. Series creator Deborah Joy LeVine wanted Lex Luthor to remain a regular cast member, but the network felt that having Superman fight the same villain every week without ever defeating him ultimately made Superman seem inept, and preferred a rotating cast of villains which would give the characters a variety of threats to overcome. LeVine, the visual effects supervisor, and the entire first-season writing team were also dismissed. Robert Singer, who took over from the original executive producer just six episodes into the first season, planned a stronger focus on action; the show also shifted its focus onto the budding romance between Lois and Clark.

With the show's budget increased and new visual effects supervisor Mark Zarate on board, the second season used more elaborate and convincing special effects than those seen in the first season. Zarate filmed lasers and composited them into shots to create more realistic visuals of Superman's heat vision and X-ray vision. The destruction and rebuilding of the Daily Planet building at the end of season one also gave Singer an excuse to build a new Daily Planet set, one more suited to the production demands of a weekly television show.

Though there was no central villain this season, the criminal organization Intergang served as an overarching menace; nearly half of the villains this season were directly or indirectly affiliated with Intergang. The removal of Lex Luthor as the main villain also allowed other villains from the comics to appear (such as The Prankster, Metallo, and the Toyman, though they generally went by their civilian names rather than their supervillain codenames). This season also featured the debut of fan-favorite villain Tempus and H. G. Wells appeared as a time-traveler.

The new writing staff all enjoyed coming up with excuses for Clark to use to terminate conversations so that he could run off and change to Superman, so these excuses and Lois's increasing hurt and frustration at them were made both an ongoing subplot and running joke throughout the season. To further increase the romantic drama, the writers introduced recurring characters to serve as romantic rivals: Mayson Drake, a district attorney who takes a romantic interest in Clark but has a total lack of regard for Superman, and Dan Scardino, a DEA agent who is a self-professed "loose cannon" in the tradition of Martin Riggs. In the season finale, Clark proposes to Lois but Lois' response is not shown as a cliffhanger for the next season. Season two became a success and garnered higher ratings in its initial airings, ending the season in 58th place.

=== Season 3 (1995–1996) ===
Season three averaged more than 18 million viewers per episode and ranked 44th for the season. Due to this strong performance, ABC renewed the series contract for an additional two seasons instead of just one.

In the premiere episode, Lois responds to Clark's marriage proposal by revealing that she figured out Clark's secret identity during the events of the season 2 finale, and she expresses concern about how she can trust him when he has kept that secret from her for so long. After they separate for a time, she and Clark carry out assignments where they either pose as a married couple or are alone together for an entire weekend, and they resolve their disagreements.

Lois finally accepts Clark's engagement ring in the seventh episode, "Ultra Woman". ABC announced that the wedding would occur on Valentine's Day weekend, with ABC sending heart-shaped "wedding invitations" to ABC News staff. A controversy erupted when ABC presented the viewers with a bogus wedding, with Clark unwittingly married to a clone of Lois. This was the start of a three-part story in which Lois is kidnapped by Lex Luthor and replaced by a clone. Once the real Lois is recovered, Lois and Clark's wedding plans are again interrupted when two other Kryptonians come to Earth, one of whom claims to be Clark's wife. Clark leaves Earth forever to become ruler of Kryptonian's world, New Krypton, in order to preempt the ascension of the evil Lord Nor to the throne and avert a civil war. Lois cannot accompany him because humans could never survive the conditions on New Krypton.

=== Season 4 (1996–1997) ===
Lane Smith as Perry White.

The final season began with the resolution of the story involving a previously unknown colony of Kryptonians. Lois and Clark finally wed in the episode "Swear To God, This Time We're Not Kidding". The same week, DC Comics released Superman: The Wedding Album, featuring the marriage of Lois and Clark. The series ended on a cliffhanger in which Lois and Clark find an infant in Clark's old bassinet, along with a note that claimed the child belonged to them. Brad Buckner, executive producer, and writer for the third and fourth seasons, later revealed the planned story was that the child "was Kryptonian royalty, stashed by his mother to keep him safe from assassins".

The series weakened in its Sunday 8:00 pm timeslot and was shifted to 7:00 pm in January, and was moved to Saturdays in the spring. The ratings dropped even further, and the show finished its last season in 104th place, averaging less than 10 million viewers per episode. It was removed from the schedule in May 1997. When the network canceled plans for season five, the producers and writers of the show were unprepared. ABC paid an undisclosed sum to Warner Bros. in order to get out of the second half of the two-season commitment they signed at the end of season three.

== Cast ==
Principal cast members of season one.

Principal cast members of the rest of the series run.

=== Main ===
Actor	Character	Seasons			
Actor	Character	1	2	3	4
Dean Cain	Clark Kent/Superman	Main	Main	Main	Main
Teri Hatcher	Lois Lane	Main	Main	Main	Main
Lane Smith	Perry White	Main	Main	Main	Main
Michael Landes	Jimmy Olsen	Main			
Justin Whalin	Jimmy Olsen		Main	Main	Main
Tracy Scoggins	Catherine "Cat" Grant	Main			
K Callan	Martha Kent	Main	Main	Main	Main
Eddie Jones	Jonathan Kent	Main	Main	Main	Main
John Shea	Lex Luthor	Main	Guest	Guest	Guest (voice only)

=== Recurring ===
- Tony Jay as Nigel St. John (Season 1-2)
- Mel Winkler, Brent Jennings and Richard Belzer as Inspector Henderson (Season 1)
- Phyllis Coates and Beverly Garland as Ellen Lane (Season 1-4)
- Denis Arndt and Harve Presnell as Sam Lane (Season 1-4)
- Elizabeth Barondes and Roxana Zal as Lucy Lane (Season 1-2)
- Chris Demetral as Jack (Season 1)
- Lane Davies as Tempus (Season 2-4)
- Terry Kiser and Hamilton Camp as H. G. Wells (Season 2-4)
- Farrah Forke as Mayson Drake (Season 2)
- Denise Crosby as Dr. Gretchen Kelly (Season 2)
- Peter Boyle as Bill Church (Season 2-3)
- Bruce Campbell as Bill Church Jr. (Season 2-3)
- Olivia Brown as Star (Season 3)
- Kenneth Kimmins as Dr. Bernard Klein (Season 3-4)
- Jessica Collins as Mindy Church (Season 3)
- Larry Poindexter as Dr. Maxwell Deter (Season 3)
- Justine Bateman as Zara (Season 3-4)
- Jon Tenney and Mark Kiely as Ching (Season 3-4)
- Simon Templeman as Lord Nor (Season 4)

== Broadcast ==
=== United States ===
Network	Season	Time slot	Premiered date	Ended date	Nielsen ratings rank	Rating	Households	Viewers
ABC	1 (1993–94)	Sunday 8:00 pm	September 12, 1993	May 8, 1994	#60	10.0	9.3 million	18.1 million
ABC	2 (1994–95)	Sunday 8:00 pm	September 18, 1994	May 21, 1995	#58	10.2	9.7 million	18.3 million
ABC	3 (1995–96)	Sunday 8:00 pm	September 17, 1995	May 12, 1996	#44	10.3	9.9 million	18.4 million
ABC	4 (1996–97)	Sunday 8:00 pm (Sep 22 – Dec. 15); Sunday 7:00 pm (Jan 5 – Mar. 23); Saturday 8:00 pm (Apr 12 – Jun. 14)	September 22, 1996	June 14, 1997	#104	6.2	6.0 million	9.7 million

From September 1997 to August 2003, all four seasons of the show were aired on TNT television network. The entire series became available on HBO Max in August 2021.

=== United Kingdom ===
The series premiered on BBC1 on Saturday, January 8, 1994, retitled as "The New Adventures of Superman". The BBC held the rights to premiere the first three seasons. It also aired on CBBC's Saturday Aardvark strand (later known as Planet Saturday) at 8:30 am. BBC2 has also repeated the series at tea times alongside The Simpsons, The Fresh Prince of Bel-Air and many others. Sky One held the premiere rights to the fourth season in 1997 and broadcast the show under the original full title. The BBC broadcast the episodes a few weeks later. Sky One broadcast seasons one, two and three just before the premiere of season four in early 1997. UK Gold, Sky Living, Bravo, Channel One and ITV2 have also repeated the series. BBC2 last repeated season one in late 2005. Satellite channel Syfy repeated the first two seasons and the first half of season three in 2012, before replacing it with Smallville.

=== Ireland ===
The series aired on RTÉ One from 1995 to 1998 and regularly rerun on TG4 from 2000 to 2002.

== Home media ==
Warner Home Video has released all four seasons of Lois & Clark: The New Adventures of Superman on DVD in Regions 1, 2, and 4. The company released the entire series on Blu-ray in the US on July 8, 2025. The UK Blu-ray of the show released on September 1, 2025.

Complete season	Episodes	Release dates		
Complete season	Episodes	Region 1	Region 2	Region 4
1	21	June 7, 2005	July 5, 2006	June 14, 2006
2	22	January 17, 2006	July 5, 2006	June 14, 2006
3	22	June 20, 2006	September 6, 2006	November 1, 2006
4	22	November 14, 2006	December 6, 2006	November 1, 2006

== Awards and nominations ==
Year	Award	Category	Recipient(s)	Result
1994	Primetime Emmy Awards	Outstanding Individual Achievement in Main Title Theme Music	Jay Gruska	Nominated
1994	Primetime Emmy Awards	Outstanding Individual Achievement in Directing in a Drama Series	Robert Butler (for "Pilot")	Nominated
1994	Saturn Awards	Best Genre Television Series	Lois & Clark: The New Adventures of Superman	Won
1994	Directors Guild of America Awards	Outstanding Directorial Achievement in Dramatic Specials	Robert Butler (for "Pilot")	Nominated
1994	Viewers for Quality Television Awards	Best Actress in a Quality Drama Series	Teri Hatcher	Nominated
1995	Primetime Emmy Awards	Outstanding Sound Mixing for a Drama Series	Kenn Fuller, Dan Hiland and Joseph D. Citarella (for "Wall of Sound")	Nominated
1995	Primetime Emmy Awards	Outstanding Individual Achievement in Costuming for a Series	Darryl Levine and Judith Brewer Curtis (for "That Old Gang of Mine")	Nominated
1996	Primetime Emmy Awards	Outstanding Sound Mixing for a Drama Series	Kenn Fuller, Joseph D. Citarella and Dan Hiland (for "Don't Tug on Superman's Cape")	Nominated

== Soundtrack ==
Lois & Clark: The New Adventures of Superman (Original Television Soundtrack)

Soundtrack album by Jay Gruska
- Released: November 4, 1997
- Length: 57:58
- Label: Sonic Images

All music is composed by Jay Gruska.

Track listing
No.	Title	Length
1.	"Main Title Theme"	1:06
2.	"Mothership"	2:02
3.	"Lois & Clark Courting"	3:13
4.	"Final Proposal"	2:02
5.	"Clark in the Country"	1:45
6.	"Final Battle"	4:36
7.	"Lois' Big Band"	1:14
8.	"Clark's Salsa"	1:47
9.	"Superman Says Goodbye"	4:25
10.	"Lois & Clark's New Home"	2:53
11.	"Baby Dreams"	3:12
12.	"Villains"	7:27
13.	"Superman Flies Home"	1:26
14.	"Lois & Clark's First Love Theme"	1:36
15.	"Virtual Reality"	2:37
16.	"Tez Arrives"	1:06
17.	"Zarah & Ching"	3:51
18.	"Tempus"	2:46
19.	"Clark Fun"	1:25
20.	"Playing the Game"	1:19
21.	"Main Title Theme (Extended Mix)"	5:38
Total length:		57:26

- Mastered at Capitol Records, Hollywood
- Digital editing, pre-mastering: Bruno Coon
- Engineers:
  - Greg Townley (all orchestral recording)
  - Michael Eric Hutchinson
  - Bobby Fernandez ("Main Title Theme" – recording & mixing)
  - Ray Pyle ("Main Title Theme extended mix" – recording & mixing)
- Art direction: Doerte Lau
- Design: Andreas Adamec

== Novels, collected editions and related merchandise ==
Lois & Clark: A Superman Novel by author C. J. Cherryh, based on the television series, was released in 1996. The novel was published in a Science Fiction Book Club hardcover edition and a paperback edition by Prima Publishing.

Other novels based on the series include:

- Lois & Clark: The New Adventures of Superman: Heat Wave
- Lois & Clark: The New Adventures of Superman: Exile
- Lois & Clark: The New Adventures of Superman: Deadly Games

DC Comics published a comic book trade paperback collected edition Lois & Clark, The New Adventures of Superman, in 1994, which featured a selection of modern era stories by John Byrne and other writers and artists. The collection includes an introduction by Byrne, with the show's stars Dean Cain and Teri Hatcher as Lois and Clark on the cover:

- Lois & Clark, The New Adventures of Superman – collects The Man of Steel #2, Superman Annual vol. 2 #1, Superman vol. 2 #9 and 11, Action Comics #600 and 655, Adventures of Superman #445, 462, and 466. (1-56389-128-X, 192 pages)

Skybox released in 1995 a series of trading cards based on the first season of the show. 90 trading cards were issued alongside 9 special cards, a series of temporary tattoos and two illustrated cards by well known artists Boris Vallejo and Julie Bell.
