= Michael Landes =

American actor (born 1972)

- Born: Michael Christopher Landes; September 18, 1972 (age 53); The Bronx, New York, US
- Education: Stella Adler Studio of Acting
- Occupation: Actor
- Years active: 1988–present
- Spouse: Wendy Benson (m. 2000)
- Children: 2

Michael Christopher Landes (born September 18, 1972) is an American actor of television and film.

== Personal life ==
Michael Christopher Landes was born to Patricia and Bernard Landes on September 18, 1972, in The Bronx, New York. Landes studied performing arts at the Stella Adler Studio of Acting in Los Angeles.

He met Wendy Benson in Boston during the summer of 1999 while they were filming The Gentleman from Boston; they married on October 21, 2000, at Saint Thomas Church in Manhattan. According to Tribute, as of May 2021 they lived in Los Angeles with their two children.

== Career ==
Landes made guest appearances on The Fresh Prince of Bel-Air, The New Lassie, and Blossom. In 2016, Landes told Digital Spy that when he was replaced on Lois & Clark: The New Adventures of Superman after the first season—"because I looked too much like Dean Cain, who played Clark... and Teri Hatcher, who played Lois"—it was his first time being fired. For his starring role in the television film Please God, I'm Only Seventeen, he was nominated for a Young Artist Award: Best Young Actor in a Television Movie, and in film, Landes also featured in Hart's War.

=== Performance credits ===
Television performances
Year	Title	Role	Episode(s)	Citation(s)
1988–1989	The Wonder Years	Kirk McCray		
1989	thirtysomething	Young Michael		
1991–1992	The Torkelsons	Riley Roberts		
1993–1994	Lois & Clark: The New Adventures of Superman	Jimmy Olsen	Season one	
1995	Courthouse			
1995–1996	Too Something			
1996	The Drew Carey Show			
1997–1998	Union Square	Michael Weiss	13 episodes	
2001–2002	Special Unit 2	Nick O'Malley		
2004	Agatha Christie's Marple	Bryan Eastley	"4.50 from Paddington"	
2004	Joey			
2005	CSI: Miami			
2005	Love Soup	Gil Raymond	Series 1	
2006	Ghost Whisperer			
2007	The Wedding Bells	David Conlon		
2008	Boston Legal	Leo Morris		
2009	New Tricks	Leonard Kuziak	"The Truth Is Out There"	
2010	Miranda	Danny	"The New Me"	
2012	Upstairs Downstairs	Caspar Landry		
2012	Don't Trust the B— in Apartment 23	Scott (Chloe's Father)		
2013	Save Me	Tom		
2013	The Crazy Ones	Josh Hayes		
2014	Reckless			
2016	American Dad!			
2016	Hooten & the Lady	Ulysses Hooten		
2018	You Are Wanted			
2019	Traitors	Caspar Woods		
2019–2020	Silent Witness	Matt Garcia	4 episodes	
2020	The Liberator			
2021	Cruel Summer	Greg Turner		

Film performances
Year	Title	Role	Citation(s)
1996	No Greater Love	George Winfield	
1996	Dream for an Insomniac	Rob	
2003	Final Destination 2	Thomas Burke	
2016	The Disappointments Room	Teddy	
2017	Gold	Glen Binkert	
2024	Arthur the King		
TBA	The Sacrifice		
