= Grant Rosenberg =

American novelist, producer, screenwriter (born 20th century)

- Born: United States
- Occupations: Novelist, producer, screenwriter
- Years active: 1980s–present
- Employer(s): Paramount Television, Walt Disney Studios
- Spouse: Marjorie Monaghan (m. 2011)

Grant Rosenberg (born 20th century) is an American novelist, producer, and screenwriter.

== Career ==
He has worked on television series, including Bitten, Lost Girl, XIII: The Series, Fear Itself, Eureka, Masters of Science Fiction, Masters Of Horror, The Outer Limits, and Lois & Clark: The New Adventures of Superman.

Prior to moving into writing and producing, he was an executive with both Paramount Television and Walt Disney Studios.

== Personal life ==
He married Marjorie Monaghan in 2011.

== Writing and production credits ==
- MacGyver (1989–1991)
- Star Trek: The Next Generation (1992)
- Lois & Clark: The New Adventures of Superman (1996–1997)
- Poltergeist: The Legacy (1996–1999)
- The Outer Limits (1999–2000)
- Tracker (2001)
- Jeremiah (2002)
- Masters of Horror (2005)
- Masters of Science Fiction (2006)
- Eureka (2007)
- Fear Itself (2008)
- XIII (2010)
- Lost Girl (2011–2012)
- Bitten (2013–2014)
- Olympus (2014–2015)

== See also ==
- List of American novelists
