= Lane Davies =

American actor (born 1950)

- Born: July 31, 1950 (age 76); Dalton, Georgia, U.S.
- Occupation: Actor
- Years active: 1973–present
- Children: 2

Lane Davies (born July 31, 1950) is an American actor.

== Personal life ==
Davies was born in Dalton, Georgia, the son of Emily and Bill Davies. He has three brothers—Bruce, George, and Whit. He graduated from Middle Tennessee State University with cum laude honors for his degree in speech and theater. Currently, he resides in Georgia with his family. He has two sons, Nathan Hamilton and Thatcher Lee.

== Stage roles ==
On stage, Davies has worked with such companies as the Trinity Square Repertory Company of Providence, Rhode Island; Atlanta's Alliance Theater; Houston's Alley Theatre; The Old Globe Theater in San Diego; the Georgia Shakespeare Festival; and the Globe Playhouse in Los Angeles, as well as with the two companies he founded and co-founded. His classical credits include Henry V, Mark Antony, Hamlet, The Taming of the Shrew, Much Ado About Nothing, The Two Gentlemen of Verona, Orlando, A Midsummer Night's Dream, Romeo & Juliet, Twelfth Night, Macbeth, and Richard III, as well as the direction of several productions.

Some of his more contemporary work includes: John Barrymore in "I Hate Hamlet", Sweeney Todd, Henry Higgins, Boolie in Driving Miss Daisy, David Crockett in the highly acclaimed Crockett By Himself, Slim in Of Mice and Men and William Desmond Taylor in a revival of Mack and Mabel, and 6 productions of "Man of La Mancha" as Cervantes/Quixote.

Davies also played the lead in such plays as Hamlet, Macbeth, The Taming of the Shrew and Cyrano de Bergerac at Thad Taylor's Globe Playhouse. He co-starred with Matthew Faison in a revival of Rosencrantz and Guildenstern Are Dead by Tom Stoppard, playing Rosencrantz. He has directed multiple productions of A Midsummer Night's Dream. Davies co-founded the Santa Susana Repertory Company in Thousand Oaks, California as well as the Kingsmen Shakespeare Company in cooperation with California Lutheran University. Kingsmen Shakespeare Company was listed, in 2004, as a Major Festival in the book Shakespeare Festivals Around the World by Marcus D. Gregio (Editor). In 2007–2008, Davies founded the Tennessee Shakespeare Festival in Bell Buckle, TN, as a professional summer company. Its first production was Shakespeare's "A Midsummer Night's Dream" (one of Davies' favorites) set in Athens, GA, instead of Athens, Greece. Lane is now involved in many productions in Middle Tennessee, including multiple performances with the Tennessee Repertory Theater in Nashville.

== Television roles ==
Davies has appeared in lead or supporting roles in four short-lived comedies: Good & Evil, Woops!, The Crew, and The Mommies. He had appeared as a feature actor on a number of shows, including Married... with Children, Major Dad, Scrubs, Seinfeld, Just Shoot Me!, and Lois & Clark: The New Adventures of Superman, where he played a time-travelling sociopath named Tempus. He also had recurring roles on 3rd Rock from the Sun, The Practice, Coach, Complete Savages, The Nanny, Dallas (“The Ewing Blues” as Craig Gurney), The Golden Girls, Empty Nest and Ellen.

Davies also played a role in the first Russian-American television crime drama, Russians in the City of Angels, also known as A Force of One, a new 12-part series that aired in Russia. Besides Lane, other American actors featured on the show included Eric Roberts, Gary Busey, and Sean Young as well as Russian stars such as acclaimed Russian filmmaker and actor Rodion Nahapetov, and Ekaterina Rednikova.

Davies guest-starred in a 2011 episode of Good Luck Charlie, season 2, episode 5, "Duncans vs. Duncans", as Mr. Krump.

=== Soap opera roles ===
Davies also has had a prolific body of work in daytime soap operas.

- His first role was as Evan Whyland on Days of Our Lives, which he played from 1981 to 1982.
- Davies' trademark dry, quick wit was part of what was perhaps his best known role, that of Mason Capwell on the now-defunct soap opera Santa Barbara. He played the role from the show's debut in July 1984 until July 1989. Davies was challenged by a complicated working relationship with co-star Nancy Lee Grahn. Constant conflict over the direction of their characters led to his departure in 1989. When he first left the show, he was quoted as saying, "It's not that I'm looking for another kind of challenge as far as acting is concerned. I'm just ready for a rest more than a challenge. I've kind of challenged myself into an early grave." He took a six-month around-the-world tour and returned to the United States in February 1990. Davies never returned to the role of Mason Capwell.
- In 1992, he filled in for Ronn Moss as Ridge Forrester on The Bold and the Beautiful as a temporary replacement while Moss was on leave.
- Davies was cast as Dr. Cameron Lewis on General Hospital from 2002 to 2004. He again appeared opposite Grahn; the two resolved their problems and were friends, and she had joined General Hospital as lawyer Alexis Davis in 1996. However, Davies was never prominently featured during his time on the show, and his character was written out just a little over a year after he joined the show.
- Davies played the role of MacKenzie Johnson on the web series The Bay from 2010 to 2012. He replaced fellow soap actor John Callahan.
- In 2024, Davies briefly re-joined the cast of General Hospital in the role of Fergus Byrne.

== Film roles ==
His film roles include The Magic of Lassie with James Stewart, Stephanie Zimbalist, and Mickey Rooney; Body Double with Melanie Griffith; Impure Thoughts with Brad Dourif; and Funland with David L. Lander, and William Windom.

== Other achievements ==
Davies has served as a member, roaming ambassador, and a Vice President of the International Federation of Festival Organizations (FIDOF), which promotes peace and friendship through music and art.

He is also actively involved in mentoring actors and teaching acting classes at various levels, including grade schools, high schools, colleges, and universities.
