= Eddie Jones (actor) =

American actor (1934–2019)

- Born: September 18, 1934; Washington, Pennsylvania, U.S.
- Died: July 6, 2019 (aged 84); Los Angeles, California, U.S.
- Occupation: Actor
- Years active: 1958–2018
- Known for: Lois & Clark: The New Adventures of Superman
- Spouse: Anita Khanzadian-Jones

Eddie Jones (September 18, 1934 – July 6, 2019) was an American actor of stage, film, and television. He appeared in more than two-hundred fifty plays, thirty-five films, and forty television shows.

== Early life ==
Jones was born in Washington, Pennsylvania. He was discovered by an agent after Jones had hitchhiked to California where he was working at a gas station.

== Career ==
Theater

Jones was a member of the InterAct Theatre Company of Los Angeles. After returning back East, he became the understudy for Charles Durning and had roles on Broadway including Jason Miller's original 1972 production of That Championship Season as George Sikowski, and Devour in the Snow (1979) as Sheriff McKinstry. Off-Broadway, he starred in Sam Shepard's original 1978 production of Curse of the Starving Class, originating the role of Ellis. He was regular at Manhattan Theatre Club, Playwrights Horizons, The Public Theater, and Hudson Guild. Nationally, Jones starred in Edward Albee's play Who's Afraid of Virginia Woolf? as Nick, and won a Los Angeles Drama Critics Circle Award for his role in Death of a Salesman as Willy Loman.

Television

Jones made his screen debut on the television soap opera Young Doctor Malone in 1958 as Dr. Matt Steele. He was known for recurring roles as NYPD Detective Lt. Brannigan in the CBS television series The Equalizer (1989), Clark Kent's father Jonathan Kent in ABC's Lois & Clark: The New Adventures of Superman (1993–1997), and Charles Borden (a.k.a. The Official), head of The Agency, in the sci-fi series The Invisible Man (2000). In addition to recurring roles, Jones made guest appearances on Spenser: For Hire (1985, 1988), Cheers (1992), Touched by an Angel (1997), Party of Five (1998), Crossing Jordan (2005), Ghost Whisperer (2005), Veep (2012), and Aquarius (2015).

Film

Jones made his film debut in 1978 as "Blackie" in Bloodbrothers. In the 1980s, he played U.S. Marshal Ned Chippy in Prince of the City (1981), a Cop in Trading Places (1983), and William McKenna in Year of the Dragon (1985). After 1990s roles in The Grifters (1990) and The Rocketeer (1991), he played second baseman Marla's widowed father Dave Hooch in A League of Their Own and Buddy Wallace in Sneakers, both in 1992. In 2003 he starred in Seabiscuit as Samuel Riddle, owner of the horses War Admiral and Man O'War. He also appeared in Return to Me (2000), and The Terminal (2004).

== Personal life and death ==
Eddie Jones resided in Los Angeles, with his wife, director Anita Khanzadian-Jones, whom he married in 1991. He died on July 6, 2019, at Cedars-Sinai Medical Center after a battle with a brain tumour, his wife Anita Jones told TheWrap.

== Filmography ==
=== Film ===
- 1978 Bloodbrothers as "Blackie"
- 1978 On the Yard as Lieutenant Olson
- 1980 The First Deadly Sin as Officer Curdy
- 1981 Prince of the City as U.S. Marshal Ned Chippy
- 1982 Q as The Watchman
- 1983 Trading Places as Cop #3
- 1984 C.H.U.D. as Chief O'Brien
- 1985 The New Kids as Charlie
- 1985 Year of the Dragon as William McKenna
- 1985 Invasion U.S.A. as FBI Agent-In-Charge Marvin Cassidy
- 1987 The Believers as Police Patient
- 1988 Apprentice to Murder as Tom Kelly
- 1989 American Blue Note as Sean Katz
- 1990 Stanley & Iris as Mr. Hagen
- 1990 Cadillac Man as Benny
- 1990 The Grifters as Mintz
- 1991 The Rocketeer as Malcolm, The Mechanic
- 1992 A League of Their Own as Dave Hooch
- 1992 Sneakers as Buddy Wallace
- 1998 True Friends as Father Reilly
- 1998 Dancer, Texas Pop. 81 as Earl
- 1999 Stranger in My House as Judge Prestwich
- 2000 Return to Me as Emmett McFadden
- 2003 The Singing Detective as Moonglow Bartender
- 2003 Seabiscuit as Samuel Riddle
- 2004 The Terminal as Richard Salchak
- 2005 Fighting Tommy Riley as Marty Goldberg
- 2010 Disconnect as Sheriff Bo Stevens
- 2011 Act Your Age as Harold
- 2014 Mercy as Pastor Gregory Luke
- 2015 Aghape as Joe (Short film)
- 2017 On the Road to Hollywood True Stories as Himself
- 2018 Lost Dogs as Pop (Short film)

=== Television ===
Eddie Jones television credits
Year	Title	Role	Notes	Ref.
1958	Young Doctor Malone	Dr. Matt Steele		
1983	Tales from the Darkside	Victor Muldoon	Episode: "Trick or Treat"	
1985	Spenser: For Hire	Michael O'Rourke	Episode: "Original Sin"	
1986	The Equalizer	Mr. Winslow	Episode: "Joyride" (S2.E4)	
1988	Spenser: For Hire	J.D. Hayes	Episode: "Company Man"	
1989	The Equalizer	Lieutenant Brannigan	4 episodes "The Visitation" (S4.E9) "Past Imperfect" (S4.E10) "Silent Fury" (S4.E12) "Heart of Justice" (S4.E19)	
1990	Kojak: Flowers for Matty	Detective Ed Mattingly	TV movie	
1990	The Young Riders	Benjamin Taylor	1 episode	
1992	Matlock	Chief Colin Young	Episode: "The Assassination" (Parts 1 & 2)	
1992	Cheers	Dr. Kluger	1 episode	
1993	The Positively True Adventures of the Alleged Texas Cheerleader-Murdering Mom	C.D. Holloway	TV movie	
1993	The Return of Ironside	Fisette	TV movie	
1993–1997	Lois & Clark: The New Adventures of Superman	Jonathan Kent	87 episodes	
1995	Letter To My Killer	Wilson Hartwick	TV movie	
1997	Touched by an Angel	Noah	Episode: "Last Call"	
1998	The Day Lincoln Was Shot	Secretary of War Edwin M. Stanton	TV movie	
1998	Party of Five	Mr. Merrin	1 episode	
2000	The Invisible Man	Charles Borden, The Official	45 episodes	
2003	The Big O	Sam	1 episode	
2005	Crossing Jordan	Pete O'Malley	1 episode	
2005	Ghost Whisperer	Funeral Ghost	1 episode	
2012	Veep	Chuck Furnam	1 episode	
2015	Aquarius	Father Mack	1 episode	

=== Theatre ===
Off-Broadway

Year	Title	Role	Theatre	Ref.
1978	Curse of the Starving Class	Ellis	Joseph Papp Public Theater	
1980	An Act of Kindness	N/A	Harold Clurman Theater	
1982	The Freak	Dr. Joe Quigly	Douglas Fairbanks Theater	
1985	Triple Feature	Edwin "Slacks"	Stage 73	
1985	Curse of the Starving Class	Weston	Promenade Theatre	
1988	April Snow	Gordon Tate	Manhattan Theatre Club Stage II	

Broadway

Year	Title	Role	Theatre	Ref.
1972	That Championship Season	George Sikowski		
1979	Devour the Snow	Sheriff George McKinstry	John Golden Theatre	
