= Superman/Doomsday: Hunter/Prey =

1994 DC Comics comic book miniseries

Superman/Doomsday: Hunter/Prey is a 1994 American comic book series published by DC Comics. The three-issue miniseries follows The Death of Superman.

== Plot ==
Superman/Doomsday: Hunter/Prey is a three-issue miniseries which explores the origin of the character Doomsday, and the rematch between him and Superman after their first battle in The Death of Superman. The story includes appearances by Bertron, Waverider, Lois Lane, Cyborg Superman, Darkseid, and the Linear Men. The story arc was written and penciled by Dan Jurgens, inked by Brett Breeding, and colored by Gregory Wright.

== Collected edition ==
The three-issue miniseries was collected as Superman/Doomsday: Hunter/Prey (ISBN 1852866640) trade paperback in 1995.

The three-issue miniseries was also collected as Superman/Doomsday: The Collected Edition softcover (ISBN 978-1401211073), along with collecting DOOMSDAY ANNUAL #1, SUPERMAN: THE DOOMSDAY WARS #1-3, ADVENTURES OF SUPERMAN #594 and SUPERMAN #175 in 2006.

The three-issue miniseries was collected again as a softcover titled Superman: Doomsday (ISBN 978-1401266660) in 2016. The edition also collects DOOMSDAY ANNUAL #1 and SUPERMAN: THE DOOMSDAY WARS #1-3 (unlike the 2006 edition, this edition does not include ADVENTURES OF SUPERMAN #594 and SUPERMAN #175 issues)

== Reception ==
Steve Faragher reviewed Superman/Doomsday – Hunter/Prey for Arcane magazine, rating it a 4 out of 10 overall. Faragher comments that "writer Jurgens and artist Breeding do their best to inject some angst into the well-chronicled cape-wearer's philosophy, but they're up against a wall of steel and their well-intentioned attempts fail to add anything new to the myth of Superman".
