= Kelex =

Fictional robot appearing in American comic books published by DC Comics

Publication information
- Publisher: DC Comics
- First appearance: The Man of Steel #1 (October 1986)
- Created by: John Byrne

In-story information
- Species: Robot
- Supporting character of: Superman
- Abilities: Enhanced vision Flight

Kelex is a fictional robot appearing in American comic books published by DC Comics, commonly in association with the superhero Superman.

== Publication history ==
Kelex first appeared in The Man of Steel #1 and was created by John Byrne.

== Fictional character biography ==
Kelex was previously one of Jor-El's robotic servants on the planet Krypton, alongside Kelor. Presumed destroyed along with Jor-El and the rest of Krypton, Kelex later resurfaces and becomes the Fortress of Solitude's caretaker.

When Superman obtains the Eradicator, a Kryptonian device, it tries to recreate Krypton on Earth, beginning with the South Pole in the Antarctic. The Eradicator's efforts create the Fortress of Solitude and a group of robotic servants, one of which is a recreation of Kelex.

The Fortress of Solitude is dramatically redesigned when Dominus takes control of Superman's mind. The Fortress is later destroyed by Lex Luthor, severely damaging Kelex. When Superman returns to the fortress, he repairs Kelex enough to enable him to speak. Kelex assists Superman in confronting an android double, programmed to protect Lois Lane, who had become defective. Kelex is vital in making the double stand down and thus rescuing Lois.

The Fortress of Solitude is restored within a Tesseract (an infinite space within a finite containment), and Kelex is once again its caretaker. This incarnation of the Fortress is destroyed during the storyline "Superman: For Tomorrow". Superman relocates his fortress to South America, but Kelex's fate is left unknown.

In the final issue of Justice League of America (vol. 2), Kelex returns and attempts to conquer Earth by amassing a robot army. He is destroyed by Supergirl and Jesse Quick, ending the threat.

Kelex is seen again in "DC Rebirth", once again a loyal assistant in Superman's Fortress of Solitude.

== Powers and abilities ==
Kelex has enhanced vision and can fly.

== Other versions ==
Kelex appears in the limited graphic novel series Superman and Batman versus Aliens and Predator.

== In other media ==
=== Television ===
- An unnamed robot based on Kelex and Cyborg Superman appears in the Legion of Super Heroes episode "Message in a Bottle", voiced by Yuri Lowenthal.
- Kelex appears in Supergirl, voiced by an uncredited actor in earlier appearances and by Mark Sussman in the sixth season.

=== Film ===
- Kelex and Kelor appear in the DC Extended Universe (DCEU) films Man of Steel and Batman v Superman: Dawn of Justice, respectively voiced by Rondel Reynoldson and Carla Gugino.
- Kelex and Kelor appear in Reign of the Supermen, respectively voiced by Trevor Devall and Erica Luttrell.

=== Video games ===
- The DCEU incarnation of Kelex appears in Lego Batman 3: Beyond Gotham as DLC.
- Kelex appears as a character summon in Scribblenauts Unmasked: A DC Comics Adventure.
