= The Death of Superman =

1992 comic book storyline

- Cover of Superman, vol. 2, #75 (Jan 1993). Art by Dan Jurgens and Brett Breeding.
- Publisher: DC Comics
- Publication date: List: Over three arcs: "Doomsday!" December 1992 – January 1993 "Funeral for a Friend" January–June 1993 "Reign of the Supermen!" June–November 1993
- Genre: Superhero crossover
Title(s)
List
- ("Doomsday!")
  - Action Comics #684
  - Adventures of Superman #497
  - Justice League America #69
  - Superman #74–75
  - Superman: The Man of Steel #18–19
  ("Funeral for a Friend")
  - Action Comics #685–686
  - Adventures of Superman #498–500
  - Justice League America #70
  - Superman #76–77, #83
  - Superman: The Man of Steel #20–21
  ("Reign of the Supermen!")
  - Action Comics #687–691
  - Adventures of Superman #501–505
  - Green Lantern (vol. 3) #46
  - Superman #78–82
  - Superman: The Man of Steel #22–26
- Main character: List: Superman Eradicator Superboy (Kon-El) Steel Cyborg Superman Lois Lane Justice League Doomsday Supergirl (Matrix) Lex Luthor Green Lantern (Hal Jordan) Mongul

Creative team
- Writer: List: (All 3 arcs) Dan Jurgens; Louise Simonson; Roger Stern (Arcs 1 and 2) Jerry Ordway (Arcs 2 and 3) Karl Kesel (Arc 2 only) William Messner-Loebs (Arc 3 only) Gerard Jones
- Penciller: List: (All 3 arcs) Jon Bogdanove; Tom Grummett; Jackson Guice; Dan Jurgens (Arc 2 only) Dennis Janke; Denis Rodier; Walt Simonson; Curt Swan (Arc 3 only) M. D. Bright
- Inker: List: (All 3 arcs) Brett Breeding; Doug Hazelwood; Dennis Janke; Denis Rodier (Arcs 1 and 2) Rick Burchett (Arc 2 only) Mike Machlan; Ande Parks; Josef Rubinstein; Trevor Scott; Walter Simonson (Arc 3 only) Romeo Tanghal
- Editor: Mike Carlin
- The Death of Superman: ISBN 1-56389-097-6
- World Without a Superman: ISBN 1-56389-118-2
- The Return of Superman: ISBN 1-56389-149-2
- The Death and Return of Superman Omnibus: ISBN 1-4012-1550-5

"The Death of Superman" is a crossover story event mostly featured in DC Comics' Superman-related publications. The crossover, which originated from editor Mike Carlin and writers Dan Jurgens, Roger Stern, Louise Simonson, Jerry Ordway, and Karl Kesel, began in December 1992 and lasted until October 1993. It was published in Superman, Action Comics, The Adventures of Superman, Superman: The Man of Steel, Justice League America, and Green Lantern. Since its initial publication, "The Death of Superman" has been reprinted in various formats and editions.

Development began after a planned story, in which Clark Kent (Superman) and Lois Lane would be married, was postponed to coincide with a similar storyline in the television series Lois & Clark: The New Adventures of Superman. While pitching possible replacements, Ordway jokingly suggested that they should kill Superman. As Superman comic sales had declined in recent years, the writing teams felt the character had been taken for granted and decided to temporarily kill him to emphasize his importance. They wanted the crossover to surprise readers and show Superman is not invincible.

"The Death of Superman" is divided into three story arcs: "Doomsday!", "Funeral for a Friend", and "Reign of the Supermen!". The first arc chronicles Superman's fight with the monster Doomsday and concludes with his death. The second depicts Superman's fellow superheroes and the rest of the DC Universe mourning his death, ending with his adoptive father Jonathan Kent having a heart attack. The third sees the emergence of four Superman impostors before the original is resurrected. A number of characters in "The Death of Superman", such as Doomsday, Superboy, Cyborg Superman, Steel, and Eradicator, would recur in later DC publications.

When news broke that DC planned to kill Superman, a beloved cultural icon, "The Death of Superman" received unprecedented coverage from the mainstream media. Superman #75, which features Superman's death, sold over six million copies and became the top-selling comic of 1992, while Adventures of Superman #500, which began his resurrection and introduced his possible successors, went on to become the best-selling comic of 1993. Retrospective reviewers are divided on the story, with some finding it ambitious and influential, while others dismiss it as a publicity stunt.

The story has been adapted into various forms of media, including two novelizations in 1993 and a beat 'em up video game, The Death and Return of Superman, in 1994. A loose animated film adaptation, Superman: Doomsday, was released in 2007. A second animated adaptation was released as a two-part film, The Death of Superman and Reign of the Supermen, in 2018 and 2019, respectively.

== Publication history ==
=== Background ===
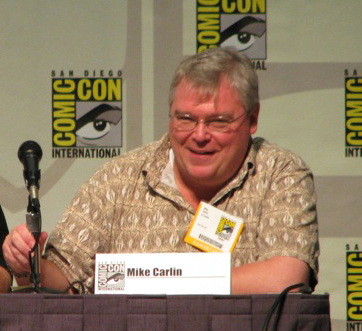
Mike Carlin at San Diego Comic-Con in 2007.

Superman is a superhero created by Jerry Siegel and Joe Shuster who appears in American comic books published by DC Comics. The character debuted in Action Comics #1 on April 18, 1938, to immediate success, and the following year became the first superhero to headline his own comic book, Superman. Since his debut, Superman has been a cultural icon in the United States.

In 1985, DC launched the crossover event Crisis on Infinite Earths, which took place in a variety of comics. Its conclusion resulted in the DC Universe—the shared universe that the publisher's comics, including those related to Superman, take place in—being rebooted. Writer/artist John Byrne re-envisioned Superman in his 1986 limited series, The Man of Steel. The following year, Byrne relaunched Superman with a new first issue and the original series was renamed The Adventures of Superman. (Note: This lasted until 2006, when The Adventures of Superman returned to the Superman title and the 1987 comic was canceled.) In the reboot, Byrne removed various elements of the Superman mythos, like Supergirl, to streamline the character for modern audiences, which also allowed him to reintroduce them in a new way later on. The relaunch was a major success for DC and The Man of Steel #1 became the bestselling comic book issue of 1986. Byrne also wrote and illustrated Action Comics, and scripted The Adventures of Superman with artist Jerry Ordway. Under Byrne, a new Superman comic was released every week and each series maintained continuity with the others. He spent two years on the Superman comics before leaving in 1988, dissatisfied with DC's lack of "conscious support" for him and that the version of Superman licensed for merchandising did not reflect Byrne's stories.

As a result of Byrne's departure, Superman group editor Mike Carlin had to assemble new creative teams to replace him. Ordway began to write The Adventures of Superman, while Roger Stern, who had recently finished a 12-year stint at rival publisher Marvel Comics, took over Action Comics. Connecting stories also became harder due to the new, more diverse creative teams, whereas Byrne had managed most of them on his own. To control consistency in stories, the teams regularly attended a "Superman Summit", which started in 1988. The summit was a unique method of making the writers work together, focusing their attention to the next year's worth of stories. These meetings were often dysfunctional, with Superman writer/penciler Dan Jurgens noting they frequently disagreed when discussing story ideas and argued until one person was "left standing". Carlin recalled that he had to act like a "babysitter" for the 18 creators during summits, and the teams often compromised. When the writing teams were having trouble deciding stories, Ordway would jokingly suggest they kill Superman.

DC editor Paul Levitz liked the success of the three interconnected Superman comics, so a fourth, Superman: The Man of Steel (written by Louise Simonson and penciled by Jon Bogdanove), started. While the creative teams believed the quality of the comics increased because there were more people working on them, they experienced a decline in sales, primarily due to the popularity of violent antiheroes like the Punisher, Spawn, and Wolverine. A new Superman comic was released every week, each selling roughly 150,000 copies an issue—"a fraction" of the numbers bestselling comics like those featuring Spider-Man enjoyed. (Note: In 1992, The Amazing Spider-Man sold an average of 519,804 copies through retailers and 25,096 through subscriptions.) The writing teams increased the romantic tension between Clark Kent (Superman's civilian identity) and Lois Lane in an effort to make the comics more appealing. Eventually, they had Kent propose to Lane and reveal he was Superman, and began to plan a storyline about their marriage. According to Carlin, they developed the wedding arc between 1990 and 1991, and planned for it to conclude in The Adventures of Superman #500 (June 1993). They also considered a "Death of..." story, but did not work on it in depth.

=== Development ===
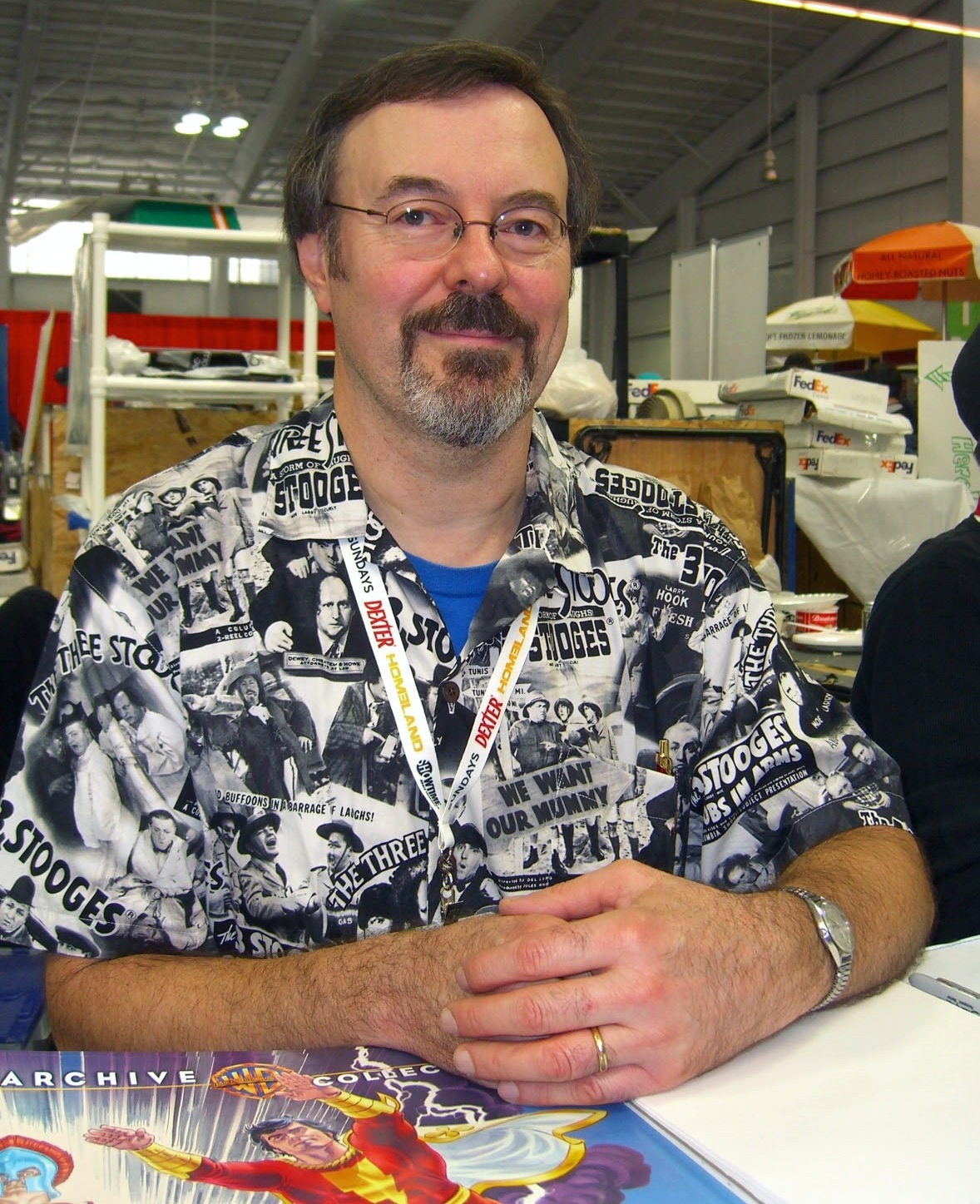
Jerry Ordway (pictured in 2012) jokingly suggested that DC should kill Superman.

While the Superman comics struggled, DC's sister company Warner Bros. developed Lois & Clark: The New Adventures of Superman, a television series for ABC centered around the relationship between Lane and Kent. One of the ideas that arose during production was the wedding of Lane and Kent. Although the series did not exist in the same continuity as the comics, Warner Bros. wanted the Superman brand to remain consistent across all forms of media. As a result, Carlin and DC president Jenette Kahn decided to put the wedding in the comics on hold until Lois & Clark reached its wedding episode so that the stories could coincide. With the original storyline set aside in the comics, the teams needed a new event to replace it.

The postponement disappointed the writing teams, as they had to put aside a year's worth of story planning and, according to Simonson, essentially had to come up with something at the last minute. At the 1991 summit, Ordway again made his joke, but no one laughed. Simonson spoke up and said, based on her experience from editing X-Men comics at Marvel, killing a major character "show[s] just how much that character means – to his friends, family, enemies, to the whole world!" Carlin liked the idea, and in the documentary film Look, Up in the Sky: The Amazing Story of Superman (2006), he recalled, "the world was taking Superman for granted, so we literally said 'let's show what the world would be like without Superman'". Jurgens formally pitched "The Death of Superman", and DC let the project move forward, which shocked Ordway.

Prior to moving forward, Carlin asked Siegel if he had any concerns with the concept of killing Superman. Siegel felt it was "a good way to shake things up"; the teams felt better knowing he approved. Bogdanove recalled how the story "almost began to write itself, from the end backwards. It felt like a story that could make the readers care again, the way we had always cared about Superman". "The Death of Superman" forced DC to cancel a non-canon, four-issue limited series Neil Gaiman and Matt Wagner were working on, as it also featured the character's death. The initial plan called for Superman to be killed in Superman #75 (January 1993) and resurrected in The Adventures of Superman #500, as both were milestone issues.

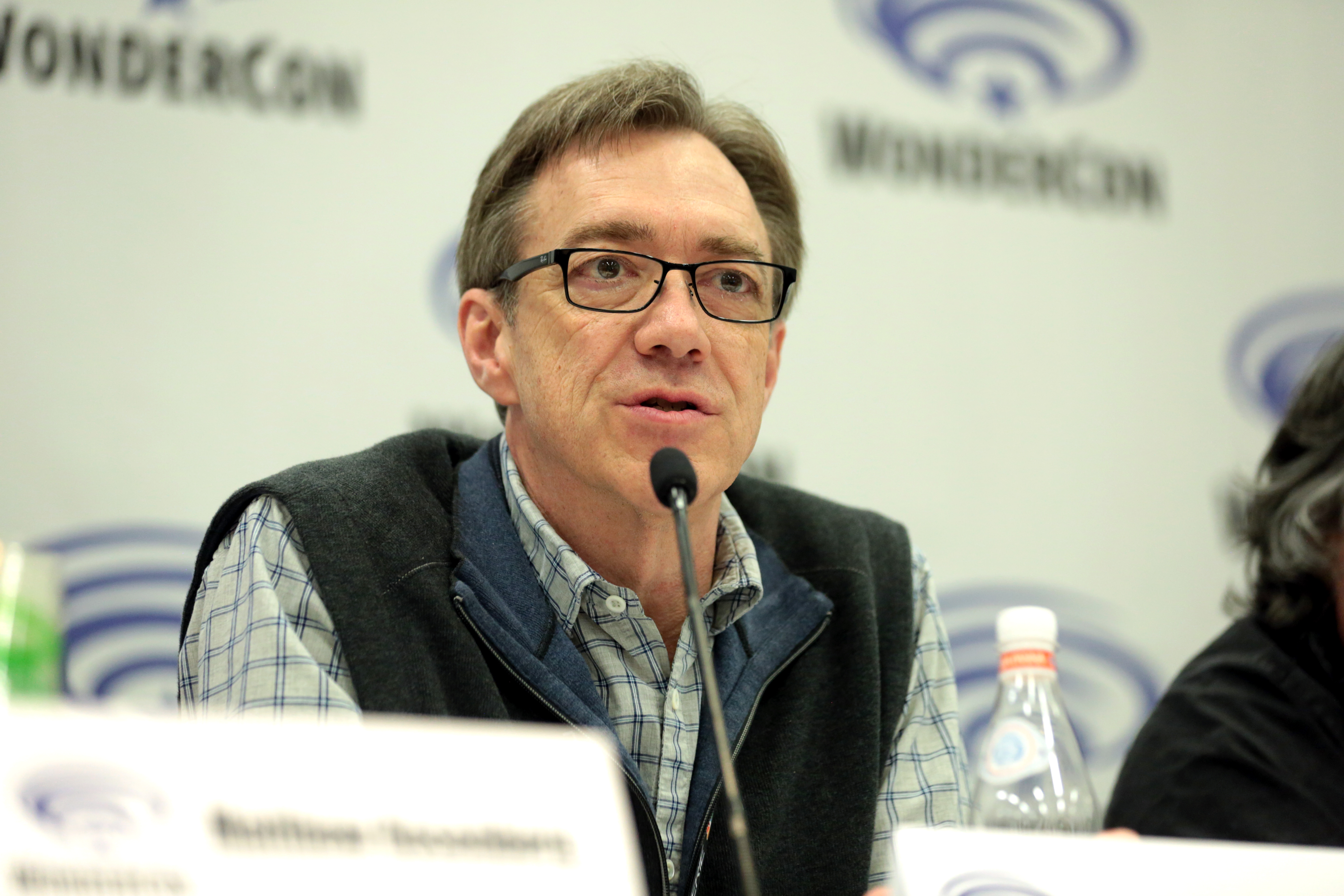
Dan Jurgens in 2018.

Jurgens created the concepts of a monster tearing apart Metropolis and an issue dedicated to a single fight sometime before "The Death of Superman"; the teams combined these when developing the story. Carlin had previously rejected the fight idea whenever Jurgens brought it up, feeling it would not be effective without a good story. When deciding which villain should kill Superman, the writers determined that his existing foes relied too much on technology and intellect, and did not want to use one of them or his traditional weakness, Kryptonite. Thus, they concluded that a new villain had to take him on physically. They chose to name this villain "Doomsday" after Carlin wrote the phrase "doomsday for Superman" on the whiteboard used for planning, and did not feel giving him an origin was important. The teams wanted Doomsday to have a distinctive look, so they gave all artists a few minutes to create designs and voted for the one they thought was best. Jurgens' design—a massive, muscular humanoid with bones ripping through his skin, inspired by the design style of Image Comics—won.

The four issues showing Superman's fight with Doomsday feature a "countdown" of panels: the first has four per page, the second has three, the third has two, and the last simply comprises splash pages. Inker Brett Breeding conceived this, as he thought it would increase the suspense and speed of the action. Furthermore, Jurgens wanted to make an issue told through splash pages and the fight seemed like the perfect fit. The story was partly an effort to show the ramifications of a superpowered fight in a city, because, as Ordway said, it "had to have consequences". The final page of issue #75—a triple-page spread depicting Lane mourning Superman—took considerable time to create. The writers wanted "The Death of Superman" to surprise readers, as they hoped to emphasize that Superman is not invincible and could be killed by something besides Kryptonite.

Interior artwork from Superman #75 (January 1993), depicting Lois Lane mourning the dead Superman; art by Dan Jurgens and Brett Breeding.

Chronicling the fallout of Superman's death did not take long, according to Bogdanove. He thought, as "the real meat of the story", it allowed them to accomplish their goal: explaining why the character matters. Ordway recalled the most exciting part for him was exploring what the DC Universe would be like without Superman and had fun writing about other characters' reactions to his death. DC did not intend for Superman's death to be permanent and the teams kept this a secret; they signed non-disclosure agreements preventing them from revealing the character would return. Carlin expected fans to know the death would be temporary, and in 2018 said he still could not believe many did not. However, the teams delayed all Superman comics for three months to create the illusion that he had really been killed because DC's solicitation cycle would have spoiled the resurrection.

The media attention caused Carlin to delay Superman's resurrection beyond The Adventures of Superman #500. Furthermore, the teams knew bringing Superman back in that issue would be illogical and held an emergency summit at a hotel in Tarrytown, New York, where they plotted the final parts of the story. The teams considered bringing Superman back harder than killing him, as they did not want to make fans feel like they had been cheated. They decided to introduce a new version of Superman before bringing back the original, but the writers each had different ideas. Simonson suggested that each writer create their own Superman, which not only solved the problem of what this new character should be like but also let the creative teams have independence after years of forced collaboration. These characters, known as the Supermen, were created using three existing characters (Eradicator, Superboy, and Hank Henshaw) and a new one (John Henry Irons). According to Bogdanove, they used the Supermen to reinforce "what makes Superman so super".

Stern characterized Eradicator as an "Old Testament" Superman who was more alien than human and compared his character to Jack Kirby's Silver Surfer. He wanted the character to be introduced in a way that readers would not be able to tell he was Eradicator until revealed. Karl Kesel conceived Superboy for another series he pitched to editor Karen Berger beforehand and characterized him as "an MTV generation" Superman. Jurgens chose to reintroduce Henshaw, whom he created a few years earlier, with his Cyborg Superman. He hoped to trick readers into thinking Henshaw was the real Superman before revealing him as a villain. Simonson and Bogdanove based Irons (Steel), an "everyman as Superman", on the African American folk hero John Henry and the Marvel character Iron Man. Additional replacements, including "Little-Boy Superman" and "Rock-Creature Superman", were created but never used. Even if their original idea was altered, each writer maintained a sense of individuality for their Superman.

The Adventures of Superman #500 was Ordway's last issue on the title, as he wanted to spend time with his family. His contract was supposed to expire with issue #499 (February 1993) but he desired to end his run on a "historical" note. Ordway also hoped to use a character from The Sandman, Death, in issue #500 but was unable to do so because of an editorial mandate barring characters from DC's mature comics line appearing in mainstream books like Superman. (Note: After the success of The Dark Knight Returns and Watchmen in 1986, DC began to publish more comics aimed at adults, such as The Sandman. These comics eventually formed an imprint, DC Vertigo, which launched in 1993. While these comics take place in the DC Universe, they rarely cross over, primarily due to the mandate, and mainstream DC writers were not allowed to use characters from these comics for around 20 years.) Kesel replaced him afterward. Because Jurgens did not want to simply use Superman's classic design when he was revived, he gave him long hair. The teams also deepened the red and blue of Superman's costume to signify that things would not be entirely the same for him. Superman briefly wore a black suit after his revival; this design came from a sketch Bogdanove made at a meeting.

=== Publication ===
"The Death of Superman" was first alluded to in Simonson's Superman: The Man of Steel #17 (November 1992); after the issue's story, a teaser panel shows Doomsday's fist repeatedly punching a wall. The crossover began the following issue, in which Doomsday is unleashed and begins to carve a brutal path of destruction across America. This leads to Superman's death in Superman #75, which DC published on November 18, 1992. There were several variants of issue #75: a standard newsstand edition; a direct market edition; and a collector's edition sold in a polybag with a black armband, poster, stickers, and a trading card, which cost more than the standard edition. Following the in-comics funeral, all the Superman publications went on hiatus until the release of The Adventures of Superman #500. Like Superman #75, collector's editions of The Adventures of Superman #500 came in polybags. One version had a translucent white bag with the red Superman logo, while another came in a black bag with a white logo. Each installment of the story received a second printing.

According to Vulture's Abraham Riesman, DC "aggressively" promoted "The Death of Superman" since it had financial incentives to do so, as comic book speculation was at its peak. Publishers like DC would designate certain comic book issues as significant, causing mint condition copies to be sold for more money. For Superman #75, DC issued a press kit to stores with a cardboard coffin, stickers, and a poster. At the height of the crossover, in May 1993 DC published a special issue, Newstime: The Life and Death of The Man of Steel. It compiled fictional news stories about Superman's death, providing an in-universe look at the event.

=== Collected editions ===
DC published the story in three collected volumes from 1992 to 1993: The Death of Superman, World Without a Superman, and The Return of Superman. The Death of Superman was released in time for the 1992 Christmas shopping season and, according to comics historian Matthew K. Manning, is the bestselling trade paperback of all time. Reprints of these collections were published in 2003, 1998, and 2004, respectively, while a recolored edition of The Death of Superman was released in 2013.

In September 2007, DC released an omnibus edition of the story, The Death and Return of Superman Omnibus. It features all the issues from previous collections along with 40 pages dedicated to promotional materials and interviews, for a total of 784 pages. Jurgens also contributed new cover art. A new version of the omnibus edition was published in 2013, while another reissue was released in 2019.

An edition of The Death of Superman containing the DVD/Blu-ray versions of the 2007 film adaptation, Superman: Doomsday, was released in 2015. DC reissued "The Death of Superman" in four "New Edition" volumes on April 5, 2016: Superman: The Death of Superman; Superman: Funeral for a Friend; Superman: Reign of the Supermen; and Superman: The Return of Superman. DC published another collection, Superman: Doomsday, around the same time; it compiles comics that feature Doomsday's return.

== Overview ==
=== Arcs ===
Title	Issues	Cover dates	Writers	Pencilers	Inkers
"Doomsday!"	Action Comics #684	December 1992 – January 1993	Roger Stern	Jackson Guice	Denis Rodier
"Doomsday!"	The Adventures of Superman #497	December 1992 – January 1993	Jerry Ordway	Tom Grummett	Doug Hazelwood
"Doomsday!"	Justice League America #69	December 1992 – January 1993	Dan Jurgens	Dan Jurgens	Rick Burchett
"Doomsday!"	Superman: The Man of Steel #18–19	December 1992 – January 1993	Louise Simonson	Jon Bogdanove	Dennis Janke
"Doomsday!"	Superman #74–75	December 1992 – January 1993	Dan Jurgens	Dan Jurgens; Brett Breeding	Brett Breeding
"Funeral for a Friend"	Action Comics #685–686	January–June 1993	Roger Stern	Jackson Guice	Denis Rodier
"Funeral for a Friend"	The Adventures of Superman #498–500	January–June 1993	Jerry Ordway	Tom Grummett	Doug Hazelwood
"Funeral for a Friend"	Justice League America #70	January–June 1993	Dan Jurgens	Dan Jurgens	Rick Burchett
"Funeral for a Friend"	Superman #76–77; 83 (Note: Although it was published after "Reign of the Supermen!", Superman #83 (November 1993) serves as an "epilogue" to the events of "Funeral for a Friend".)	January–June 1993	Dan Jurgens	Dan Jurgens	Brett Breeding
"Funeral for a Friend"	Superman: The Man of Steel #20–21	January–June 1993	Louise Simonson	Jon Bogdanove	Dennis Janke
"Reign of the Supermen!"	Action Comics #687–691	June–October 1993	Roger Stern	Jackson Guice	Denis Rodier
"Reign of the Supermen!"	The Adventures of Superman #501–505	June–October 1993	Karl Kesel	Tom Grummett	Doug Hazelwood
"Reign of the Supermen!"	Green Lantern #46	June–October 1993	Gerard Jones	M. D. Bright	Romeo Tanghal
"Reign of the Supermen!"	Superman #78–82	June–October 1993	Dan Jurgens	Dan Jurgens	Brett Breeding
"Reign of the Supermen!"	Superman: The Man of Steel #22–26	June–October 1993	Louise Simonson	Jon Bogdanove	Dennis Janke

"The Death of Superman" is divided into a trilogy of story arcs; the first is known as "Doomsday!", which leads to Superman's death at the hands of Doomsday. The second story arc, "Funeral for a Friend", which focuses on the immediate aftermath of Superman's death, began with The Adventures of Superman #498 (January 1993). The final story arc, "Reign of the Supermen!", began with a prologue in The Adventures of Superman #500 and introduced the Supermen. The title of this arc references Siegel and Shuster's first Superman story, "The Reign of the Superman". It crosses into the larger DC Universe, with Green Lantern #46 (October 1993) featuring a tie-in story. Despite the gap between the releases of "Funeral for a Friend" and "Reign of the Supermen!", no time passed within the continuity of the comics. "The Death of Superman" concluded in October 1993 with The Adventures of Superman #505, in which Superman returns to Metropolis.

=== Characters ===
- Superman (Kal-El / Clark Kent) is a superhero with a strong sense of justice, morality, and righteousness. He is the last remaining resident from the planet Krypton after his father, Jor-El, sent him to Earth in a small spaceship before the planet exploded. He has the powers of flight, x-ray vision, and super-strength, among others.
- Jonathan and Martha Kent are Superman's adoptive parents who found him after his spaceship crash-landed on their farm. They raised him from his youth with a strong sense of morals and encourage him to use his powers for the betterment of humanity.
- Lois Lane is a reporter for the Daily Planet, a newspaper based in Metropolis. She is an ambitious woman who is strong and opinionated. As Clark's fiancée, she knows he is Superman.
- Jimmy Olsen is a photographer for the Daily Planet. Olsen is close friends with Superman and designed a watch which emits a high-pitched signal only he can hear.
- The Justice League International (Guy Gardner, Blue Beetle, Booster Gold, Maxima, Fire, Ice, and Bloodwynd) is a team of superheroes who defend the world from catastrophic threats.
- Supergirl is a being made from protoplasm who comes from an alternate reality in which Superman was killed. She possesses powers similar to his and can also shapeshift. She attempts to help Superman when Doomsday attacks.
- Lex Luthor is a businessman with an "ends justify the means" approach to life. He is wealthy, powerful, intelligent, and Superman's archenemy, viewing him as a threat to humanity.
- Guardian is a skilled fighter with enhanced strength and reflexes. He is accomplished at gymnastics and deduction, and defends himself with a golden helmet and shield.
- Doomsday is an ancient Kryptonian monster who, after escaping from his ancient prison, carves a murderous path of destruction across America. He can easily heal from damage and develop resistance to injuries. The name "Doomsday" comes from Booster Gold comparing his rampage to end times.
- Professor Emil Hamilton is a former employee of S.T.A.R. Labs and Superman's scientific advisor. He has designed and built devices such as a force field generator.
- Bibbo Bibbowski is the owner of the Ace o' Clubs bar in Metropolis. He admires Superman and identifies himself as the hero's biggest fan. When Doomsday attacks, Bibbowski assists Hamilton and Superman in their efforts to stop him.

Four promotional images for "Reign of the Supermen!", each of one of the four Supermen. Clockwise from top left: Eradicator (art by Jackson Guice and Denis Rodier), Steel (art by Jon Bogdanove and Dennis Janke), Superboy (art by Tom Grummett and Doug Hazelwood), and Cyborg Superman (art by Dan Jurgens and Brett Breeding).

- The "Supermen" are four individuals who claim to be Superman, each representing a different moniker or trait he is associated with taken to the extreme.
  - Steel represents Superman's nickname "the Man of Steel", wears a suit of armor, and wields a hammer. As a boy, he witnessed the death of his parents, while Superman later saved him during a construction site accident.
  - Cyborg Superman represents Superman's nickname "the Man of Tomorrow" and has a half-robotic body. A former astronaut, he holds a grudge against Superman, who saved him after a solar flare killed everyone in his spaceship crew.
  - Superboy is a teenage clone of Superman created by the genetic engineering corporation Project Cadmus. He represents the placeholder's heroing residence as "The Metropolis Kid". While he possesses many of Superman's abilities, Superboy is brash and impulsive.
  - Eradicator represents Superman's status as "the Last Son of Krypton" and is a visored, energy-powered alien. He has little time for civilian life, instead focusing on delivering justice.
- Mongul is the ruler of Warworld, a space empire where citizens are entertained by gladiatorial games. An enemy of Superman, Mongul is stronger than him, intelligent, and can use telekinesis.
- Green Lantern (Hal Jordan) is a member of the Green Lantern Corps and a former fighter pilot. He gets his powers from a special ring that allows him to channel will power to create objects out of light.

=== Synopsis ===
Doomsday emerges from an underground bunker and encounters the Justice League International. He easily defeats them, but Superman arrives and the two fight across America. Lois Lane and Jimmy Olsen are sent to cover the battle for television, while Lex Luthor dissuades Supergirl from joining the fight and convinces her that she is needed in Metropolis. Doomsday sees a commercial for a Metropolis wrestling competition and heads for the city.

Superman throws Doomsday on the mountain housing Project Cadmus, but fails to stop him from reaching Metropolis. Supergirl rebels against Luthor and goes to Superman's aid, but a single punch from Doomsday knocks her to the ground. Professor Emil Hamilton and Bibbo Bibbowski fire a laser cannon at Doomsday, but it does not harm him. Doomsday and an exhausted and badly injured Superman fight and strike each other with so much force that the shockwaves from their punches shatter windows. At the struggle's culminating moment in front of the Daily Planet building, both lay a massive blow upon each other, killing Doomsday and mortally wounding Superman. In the arms of a frantic Lane, Superman succumbs to his wounds and dies. Olsen, Justice League members Ice and Bloodwynd, and Guardian are also present at the end, with Olsen bitterly photographing Superman's fall.

Superman's death stuns and traumatizes the residents of the DC Universe. His funeral is attended by nearly every superhero, as well as some supervillains, then President Bill Clinton, and First Lady Hillary Clinton. Every hero wears a black arm band featuring Superman's crest. After the funeral, Project Cadmus steals Superman's body from his mausoleum to clone him, but Lane and Supergirl recover it. With Superman gone, the crime rate rises; the costumed heroes of Metropolis, including a team funded by Luthor, rise to fill in as protectors but are insufficient.

Jonathan Kent takes Superman's death the hardest. One night, while reading a newspaper story Lane wrote in Superman's honor, Jonathan begins to feel responsible for his son's death and has a heart attack in his wife Martha's arms. In a coma, Jonathan meets Superman in the afterlife and convinces him to come back, before reawakening. Meanwhile, four men claiming to be Superman—Steel, Cyborg Superman, Superboy, and Eradicator—emerge, and Lane discovers his grave is empty. Steel and Superboy are disproven as the original Superman, but Cyborg Superman and Eradicator both seem to recall some of his memories. Hamilton tests Cyborg Superman and concludes he is the real Superman. In actuality, Eradicator stole Superman's body and placed it in a regeneration matrix in the Fortress of Solitude, drawing on his recovering energies for power.

A powerless Superman, wearing a black costume, escapes the matrix. Cyborg Superman helps Mongul destroy Coast City and, in its ruins, they begin to build Engine City in an effort to recreate Mongul's home planet, Warworld. Superboy asks Steel to help him fight Cyborg Superman, and Superman and Supergirl join the two. They travel to Engine City, where Cyborg Superman launches a missile at Metropolis with the intent of destroying it and building a second Engine City in its place. Superboy manages to stop the missile before it strikes. Hal Jordan returns from space to find Coast City destroyed. Devastated, Jordan attacks Engine City and defeats Mongul. Eradicator joins the fight and shields Superman from Kryptonite gas. The gas kills Eradicator but also evolves within him. It passes into Superman, allowing him to regain his powers and defeat Cyborg Superman. Supergirl uses her powers to reconstruct Superman's original costume and they return to Metropolis.

== Alternate versions ==
In an alternate story told in Tales from the Dark Multiverse, Lois Lane becomes enraged and bitter after the death of Superman by Doomsday's hands, believing the world failed him. After meeting the Eradicator, who failed to bring Superman back to life, Lois proposes that the two merge, turning Lois into the Eradicator. Taking extreme measures to 'make the world a better place', Lois kills Lex Luthor, the Joker and Batman and goes to fight Cyborg Superman. When the real Superman returns, only for him to be killed by Cyborg Superman, Lois kills the latter and continues her role as Earth's "savior".

== Reception ==
=== At release ===
As DC did not reveal that Superman would be revived at the end of the story, many fans believed "The Death of Superman" had permanently killed Superman, a beloved cultural icon. Thus, it attracted unprecedented coverage from the mainstream media; NPR's Glen Weldon stated "news outlets like Newsweek, People, and New York's Newsday pounced upon" the killing of Superman, and it made the front page of Newsday. Details of "The Death of Superman" were covered by the media before DC wanted them to and the company's publicists were not ready to talk about the story when it appeared in Newsday. Mark Potts of The Washington Post speculated the death would not last, but nonetheless expressed interest in what a world without Superman would be like.

Saturday Night Live (SNL) parodied "The Death of Superman" in a sketch in the seventh episode of its eighteenth season. The sketch depicts the casts of DC and Marvel attending Superman's funeral. Black Lightning, portrayed by Sinbad, tries to enter, but no one knows him even though he claims to have taught Superman how to fly. Den of Geek! named this the best of SNL's superhero-themed sketches.

The attention caused "The Death of Superman" to become an unforeseen success. Comic book retailers ordered five million copies of Superman #75 in advance and many people who had never read comics bought the issue hoping it would become an expensive collector's item. Numerous former readers looking for nostalgia also purchased Superman #75. DC shipped between 2.5 and 3 million copies of the issue on the day of release and it sold out across America. Some stores had one-per-customer limits on the issue to avoid mobs and lines of customers longer than a city block. The issue brought in a total of US$30 million during its first day on sale and ultimately sold more than six million copies, making it the bestselling comic book issue of 1992. Sales from Superman #75 doubled DC's market share in November 1992. After the issue was released, Siegel met with Carlin to tell him that "The Death of Superman" impressed him. The success of the event turned Jurgens, who had been an average writer and penciller, into an industry star.

The four bestselling issues of 1993 were The Adventures of Superman #500, Action Comics #687, Superman #78, and Superman: The Man of Steel #22. Additionally, the first installments of "Reign of the Supermen!" were among the top five bestselling comic books of June 1993. Valiant Comics timed the release of Bloodshot #1 to the release of #75, and Turok: Dinosaur Hunter #1 to the release of The Adventures of Superman #500 to take advantage of the increased customers and boost sales. Both books included cover enhancements to attract customer attention. However, many retailers say The Adventures of Superman #500 was the beginning of a decline in the comic industry. Retailers and distributors were stuck with unsold copies, and thousands of stores closed. Additionally, those who bought Superman #75 could only sell first printings for cover price a few months after its release.

=== In later years ===
Some commentators have retrospectively dismissed "The Death of Superman" as little more than a publicity stunt to give the Superman comics a brief surge in sales. Indeed, each series' sales immediately declined following Superman's resurrection. While most fans figured the death was only temporary, those who did not felt deceived. "Worst Episode Ever" (2001), the eleventh episode of The Simpsons' twelfth season, mocks this frustration through a scene in which Nelson Muntz holds the comic The Death of Sad Sack and declares "this better not be another fake-out". Wizard compared the phenomenon to the New Coke debacle, in which The Coca-Cola Company updated the formula to its signature drink before quickly changing it back after negative publicity, leading to rumors that the company simply did so in an effort to spike sales.

ComicsAlliance writer Chris Sims believed that most people bought Superman #75 just to see Superman's death, while Weldon speculated its sales were propelled by hopes it would become valuable. Gerard Jones, who wrote the Green Lantern tie-in story, theorized that the phenomenon may have been due in part to the then-relatively recent poor ending of the Superman film franchise. Sims recalled that when he worked in a comic book store in 2009, some customers were shocked that DC was still publishing Superman comics, as they did not read the story's conclusion.

Generally, DC writers have denied "The Death of Superman" was a publicity stunt. Jurgens, for instance, stated he did not anticipate the attention, while Stern believed the sensation was caused only because it was a good story. Levitz said DC had no reason to think the wider public would care because they killed Superman in stories before.

Despite these accusations, many view "The Death of Superman" favorably. Sims called the crossover DC's greatest success of the 1990s and a definitive Superman story. He thought that while killing off an important comics character was not an original idea, "The Death of Superman" was more ambitious and had a greater legacy than other similar events. Steve Morris of Comics Beat also thought it had a major impact, with "strong storytelling and a simple, if well-done, central narrative". He said the main story was well planned, especially considering that it could have easily misfired. Brian Salvatore, writing for Multiversity Comics, believed the story was effective and "present[ed] some pretty compelling arguments for why Superman is the greatest superhero of all time, without ever really coming out and saying that". He also praised the characterization, forcing Superman to rely on pure instinct.

Conversely, The Escapist's Bob Chipman described the event as a "dumb story full of crappy characters embodying almost all of the worst trends of dreadful [1990s] comics", and lamented its influence on subsequent Superman films and comics in general. Chad Nevett of Comic Book Resources called the story boring and jumbled, comparing issue #75 to "trading cards that intend[ed] to tell a story than an actual comic story". Morris did criticize its subplots as nonsensical and felt Doomsday was terribly designed, disagreeing with Sims that it was a definitive Superman story. Salvatore felt it had missed opportunities and criticized the Justice League's role in the story, comparing them to punching bags. Both Salvatore and Nevett thought Doomsday came out of nowhere, and Nevett joked he was a "walking plot device" rather than a true villain. Penciler Curt Swan disliked the story because he thought it "came out of the blue. There was no build-up, no suspense developed. Superman had no foreboding of some force out there that would conquer him. It all occurred too quickly".

=== Legacy in comics ===
"The Death of Superman" had an immediate effect on DC's comics. DC timed a similar event featuring Batman, "Knightfall", to happen shortly after "The Death of Superman", followed by the deaths of Wonder Woman, Green Arrow, and the Flash. Green Lantern's event, "Emerald Twilight", in which he turned into the villain Parallax, ties to events that occur during "The Death of Superman", with Hal Jordan going insane after Mongul destroys his hometown of Coast City. Marvel published the Spider-Man "Clone Saga" as a response to the media attention "The Death of Superman" garnered. It featured Spider-Man having a baby, which Marvel believed would appeal to news outlets. Despite these similar story attempts, Weldon commented that the industry "was in freefall" and "death/disabling stunts offered only brief sales spikes".

Some characters established during "The Death of Superman" became recurring characters in DC's comics. Superboy and Steel received ongoing series after the story's conclusion and Steel appears in a self-titled film (1997), portrayed by basketball player and Superman fan Shaquille O'Neal. Eradicator received a limited series, Superboy remained a fixture of the DC Universe, while Cyborg Superman became a recurring enemy of Superman and Green Lantern. Later comics featuring Doomsday included Superman/Doomsday: Hunter/Prey (1995), which explores his origin, and "Reign of Doomsday" (2011), which heavily references "The Death of Superman" and features him hunting down the Supermen.

In 2011, DC relaunched its entire comics line in an initiative called The New 52, which revamped the DC Universe and erased certain events. The relaunch altered Superman considerably, characterizing him as shorter-tempered and no longer married to Lois Lane. However, "The Death of Superman" remained intact in the new DC Universe. To coincide with the release of the animated film adaptation of the crossover in 2018, a 12-part Death of Superman webcomic series began, written by Simonson and illustrated by Cat Staggs, Joel Ojeda, and Laura Braga, among others. The first parts chronicle Superman's actions hours before Doomsday kills him; later parts follow Jimmy Olsen during the confrontation and the aftermath of Superman's death.

The "Infinite Frontier" relaunch had a 30th anniversary issue revolving around The Death of Superman which included reminiscings of the event, Superman fighting a Doomsday-like creature called Doombreaker, and a story set shortly after Superman's death where Guardian, Dan Turpin, and Maggie Sawyer tend to Superman's body in the morgue and Paul Westfield attempts to claim Superman and Doomsday's bodies for his own uses.

== Adaptations ==
=== Film ===
- In the wake of "The Death of Superman", Warner Bros. acquired the rights to produce Superman films, and hired Jon Peters to write a script for a sequel to Superman IV: The Quest for Peace (1987). The script, called Superman Reborn, borrowed liberally from "The Death of Superman", including the fight between Superman and Doomsday, but Warner Bros. disliked it due to its similar themes to Batman Forever (1995). Later rewrites altered the story considerably and the film ultimately never came to fruition. Superman Lives, another canceled Superman film that would have been directed by Tim Burton, started as an adaptation of "The Death of Superman"; Warner Bros. executives believed the story was "the key" to revive the Superman franchise.
- Warner Bros. released an animated direct-to-video film adaptation, Superman: Doomsday, in 2007. Superman: Doomsday is loosely based on "The Death of Superman"; to fit within a 75-minute runtime, the story was condensed and greatly altered. For example, the Justice League is not present and most aspects of "Reign of the Supermen!" were removed. The film was a commercial success and started the DC Universe Animated Original Movies line of direct-to-video releases.
- The DC Extended Universe series of films contains references to "The Death of Superman", beginning with the appearance of Superman's black suit in Man of Steel (2013). The climax of Batman v Superman: Dawn of Justice (2016) draws narrative elements from "Doomsday!". In the film, Lex Luthor uses forbidden Kryptonian genetic engineering projects to combine General Zod's corpse with his own DNA, creating Doomsday. During their fight, Superman and Doomsday deliver killing blows, respectively, and both die. Jurgens received a "Special Thanks" credit at the end of the film. In Justice League (2017), the black suit reappears as an Easter egg in a deleted scene. Costume designer Michael Wilkinson explained that director Zack Snyder planned to have Superman wear the suit when he was resurrected in the film, but scrapped the idea in pre-production. Superman wore the black suit in Snyder's 2021 director's cut of the film, Zack Snyder's Justice League.
- A second animated film adaptation was made in two parts: The Death of Superman (2018) and Reign of the Supermen (2019), part of the DC Universe Animated Original Movies line and of DC Animated Movie Universe. Compared to Superman: Doomsday, the new adaptation is more faithful to the comic story. DC's Tim Beedle considered the films "much less condensed" and said they "include many of the fan-favorite moments from the story that were left out of Doomsday".

=== Television ===
- Elements of "Funeral for a Friend" are adapted in the Justice League episode "Hereafter", including Batman watching Superman's memorial procession from a rooftop. After Superman was presumed dead after being sent to the future by Toyman, the whole world organized a funeral for him, with his family, friends, and allies attending, including Lex Luthor.
- Elements of "The Death of Superman" and "Reign of the Supermen!" appear in television series set in the Arrowverse:
  - During the 2019-2020 crossover "Crisis on Infinite Earths", a scene set on Earth-75 depicting their Earth's Lois Lane (Elizabeth Tulloch) mourning a dead Superman (Tyler Hoechlin) can be shown on the news after being killed by Earth-38's Lex Luthor (Jon Cryer).
  - The character John Henry Irons appears in Superman & Lois, portrayed by Wole Parks. This version is from a pre-Crisis Earth (TUD-22), before it was anti-mattered; he was married to his Earth's Lois Lane and together they had a daughter named Natalie. One day, their Earth is suddenly invaded by an army of evil Kryptonians unleashed by Morgan Edge/Tal-Rho and led by a rogue Kal-El, bearing a black suit. This Kal kills Lois during a news broadcast. John and Nat hide and build a Steel suit equipped with a kinetic heavy hammer and an A.I which is set for Lex Luthor (as the parts came from the LutherCorp of their earth). After finding Kal-El, Irons goes after him promising Nat he will return after he kills Kal. However, while Irons is on a ship that is being attacked by Kal, a wave of anti-matter from the Anti-Monitor Crisis destroys his Earth and crash lands on Earth-TUD25, the earth where Superman & Lois is set. Sometime later, Irons discovers Earth-TUD25’s Superman is alive. Fearing what would happen on this Earth like what happened on his Earth, Irons swears to kill this Superman. In his Steel armor, Iron grabs Superman's attention by attacking several oil rigs due to them containing lead, one of Superman's weaknesses. Irons manages to stab Superman with Kryptonite, weakening Superman. Returning to his base somewhere in the pole, Irons is notified by his A.I, who has recognized Irons as "Captain Luthor", that he has no Kryptonite left, prompting Irons to search for more around the globe while also building a new ship. Later, Irons introduces himself as Marcus Bridgewater to Lois and offers his help on her investigation on Earth-TUD25’s Edge. When Lois becomes suspicious of Marcus, she deduces that she is actually John Henry Irons, who on Earth-TUD25 died six years ago in 2015 during a tour in Afghanistan. Superman then confronts Irons, who brutally injures Superman with his hammer. Superman is saved by his son Jordan and Irons is taken into custody at the D.O.D. to be interrogated. Irons reveals to Superman what happened on his Earth and his plans to kill him. While being taken back to his cell, the facility is attacked by one of Edge's X-Kryptonians who attacks Irons, but Irons is saved by Superman. Irons is released by the D.O.D. and makes amends with Superman, who wants to team up with Irons in a potential war on Earth-TUD25 before Irons drives off in the distance in his R.V. Irons then properly authorizes the A.I. to call him by his real name and erase the Luthor protocol.
  - The Death of Superman" storyline appears in the third and fourth seasons of Superman & Lois where Lex Luthor experimented on Kal-El / Bizarro from the Inverse World and transformed him into Doomsday to get revenge on the couple. After an intense battle in space, Doomsday rips out Superman's heart and delivers it to Luthor who has it placed in a special box built by Milton Fine. Clark's son Jordan delivers his body to the Fortress to keep it in stasis until they can get his heart back. Jordan attempts to retrieve it from Luthor, but fails as the villain destroys it in front of him following a sonic ambush by Luthor's men. When Sam Lane is confronted by Luthor and Doomsday, he injects himself with the same serum used to resurrect Bizarro and allows himself to be killed by Doomsday so that his heart could be transferred into Superman's body. The transfer successfully brings Superman back to life, albeit with some limitations on his powers that he eventually overcomes, though his heart is never as strong again. In the series finale following the defeat of Doomsday and Lex Luthor, it is revealed that Clark lived for 32 years after the transfer before dying of natural causes as his children continue his legacy.
- "The Death of Superman" is alluded to in the Creature Commandos episode "Chasing Squirrels", where Superman is killed and crucified in a potential future. His cape is wrapped around a pole, homaging the cover of Superman #75.
- Multiple easter eggs on "The Death of Superman" appear in the Harley Quinn episode "The Big Apricot". During the opening of the Metropolis Superman Museum, newspapers reporting both the death and resurrection of Superman, as well as Superman's black suit, appear as exhibits.
- The third season of My Adventures with Superman is inspired by the "Reign of the Supermen!" storyline.

=== Video games ===
Blizzard Entertainment and Sunsoft developed a video game based on the story, The Death and Return of Superman, which was released in 1994 for the Super Nintendo Entertainment System and in 1995 for the Sega Genesis. The Death and Return of Superman is a beat 'em up in which the player controls Superman and the Supermen as they attempt to save Metropolis. Retrospectively, Nintendo Life's Dave Cook considered it the game that "finally [gave] Superman the video game justice he deserves in what is undoubtedly one of his most celebrated stories" and IGN's Greg Miller called it one of his favorite games and said it was what inspired him to become a video game journalist.

=== Novels ===
Stern wrote a novelization of "The Death of Superman", The Death and Life of Superman, in 1993. Additionally, Simonson wrote another adaptation, Superman: Doomsday & Beyond, around the same time. It features cover art by Alex Ross.
