= Fortress of Solitude =

Location featured in Superman comics

- Superman location
- The Fortress of Solitude's exterior as depicted on the cover of Action Comics #1049 (November 2022), art by Steve Bach.
- First appearance: Action Comics #241 (June 1958)
- Created by: Jerry Coleman; Wayne Boring
- Genre: Superhero comics

In-universe information
- Type: Fortress
- Locations: Arctic
- Characters: Superman; Lois Lane; Supergirl; Krypto; Jimmy Olsen; Steel (John Henry Irons); Superman Emergency Squad; Conner Kent; Jon Kent; Kelex
- Publisher: DC Comics

The Fortress of Solitude is a fictional fortress appearing in American comic books published by DC Comics, commonly in association with Superman. It is the place where Superman first learned about his true identity, heritage, and purpose on Earth. The fortress functions as a place of solace/occasional headquarters for Superman and is typically depicted as being in frozen tundra, away from civilization. Its predecessor, Superman's "Secret Citadel", first appeared in Superman #17, where it was said to be built into a mountain on the outskirts of Metropolis. By issue #58 (May–June 1949) it is referred to as the Fortress of Solitude, seems at a glance to be a freestanding castle, and is said to be located in a "polar waste". When the Fortress reappears in 1958 and for the first time takes center stage in a story ("The Super-Key to Fort Superman", Action Comics #241), it is again an underground complex in a mountainous cliffside.

Traditionally, the Fortress of Solitude is located in the Arctic, though more recent versions have been in other locations, including the Antarctic, the Andes, and Amazon rainforest. The general public is either unaware or vaguely aware of the existence of the Fortress, and its location is kept secret from all but Superman's closest friends and allies (such as Lois Lane and Batman). A trademark of the Fortress is that it contains a memorial statue of Jor-El and Lara, Superman's Kryptonian parents, holding a large globe of Krypton. Although Superman has living quarters at the Fortress, his main residence is still Clark Kent's apartment in Metropolis. The Arctic Fortress of Solitude concept was first created for pulp hero Doc Savage during the 1930s.

== Original version ==
The Silver and Bronze Age Fortress of Solitude from DC Special Series #26 (1981). Art by Ross Andru and Dick Giordano.

The concept and name "Fortress of Solitude" first appeared in the Doc Savage pulps in the 1930s and 1940s. Savage built his Fortress of Solitude in the Arctic and retreated to it alone to make new scientific or medical breakthroughs, and to store dangerous technology and other secrets. The Golden Age Superman did not have an Arctic fortress, but instead a "mountain sanctuary" which was located in a mountain range on the outskirts of Metropolis. Here, Superman kept a diary, oversized tools for various projects, and other equipment and trophies.

Superman's Silver Age Fortress, which debuted in 1958, was also located in the Arctic and served similar purposes. Built into the side of a steep cliff, the Fortress was accessible through a large gold-colored door with a giant keyhole, which required an enormous key to open it. The arrow-shaped key was so large that only Superman (or another Kryptonian such as Supergirl) could lift it; when not in use, the key sat on a perch outside of the Fortress, where it appeared to be an aircraft path marker. This was until a helicopter pilot followed the direction of the arrow straight to the entrance of the Fortress, forcing Superman to develop a cloak to camouflage the entrance and key and to ensure the Fortress's secrecy. According to Action Comics #261, Superman first established secret Fortresses in outer space and at the center of the Earth before settling on an Arctic location.

The Fortress contained an alien zoo, a giant steel diary in which Superman wrote his memoirs (using either his invulnerable finger, twin hand touch pads that record thoughts instantly, or heat vision to engrave entries into its pages), a chess-playing robot, specialized exercise equipment, a laboratory where Superman worked on various projects such as developing defenses to kryptonite, a room-sized computer, communications equipment, and rooms dedicated to all of his friends, including one for Clark Kent to fool visitors. As the stories continued, it was revealed that the Fortress was where Superman's robot duplicates were stored. It also contained the Phantom Zone projector, various pieces of alien technology he had acquired on visits to other worlds, and, much like the Batcave, trophies of his past adventures. Indeed, the Batcave and Batman himself made an appearance in the first Fortress story. The Fortress also became the home of the bottle city of Kandor (until it was enlarged), and an apartment in the Fortress was set aside for Supergirl.

A detailed depiction of the Fortress and its contents forms the background to DC Special Series #26 (1981); "Superman and his Incredible Fortress of Solitude", in which Superman minutely inspects the Fortress, suspecting an enemy has planted an Earth-destroying bomb within it. Another noteworthy appearance of this version of the Fortress was in 1985's Superman Annual #11, a story by Alan Moore and Dave Gibbons titled "For the Man Who Has Everything", in which it served as a battleground for Superman, Batman, Robin, and Wonder Woman against the alien would-be overlord Mongul. This story was adapted to animation in the 2004 TV series Justice League Unlimited.

Additionally, Superman established an undersea Fortress of Solitude – hollowed out of the side of an undersea cliff – in September 1958. The undersea Fortress, which is reportedly located at the bottom of the Sargasso Sea at 28 degrees North latitude, 50 degrees West longitude, is stocked with numerous exotic ocean relics and is equipped with sophisticated monitoring apparatus to enable Superman to keep abreast of events occurring throughout the seven seas. Superman later abandoned the undersea Fortress and the structure is now used by the mer-people of Atlantis as a showplace and a tourist attraction.

The original version of the Fortress of Solitude made its last appearance in the 1986 non-canonical (or "imaginary") story "Whatever Happened to the Man of Tomorrow?". In this story, under constant attacks by returning foes, Superman goes to ground inside the Fortress, taking his closest friends with him for their protection. The villainous android Brainiac soon besieges the Fortress with various allies, surrounding it and the outlying territory with an impenetrable force field to keep Superman's fellow heroes from aiding him. Superman battles Mister Mxyzptlk, who was behind the plot to destroy him. As Superman was forced to destroy Mxyzptlk, breaking his vow against killing, he exposes himself to gold kryptonite to permanently remove his powers and then appears to leave the Fortress to freeze to death in the Arctic cold. Superman is never seen again, although we find out in a "ten years later" wraparound segment set in 1997 that he survives as Jordan Elliot, husband of Lois Lane Elliot, and that they are the parents of toddler Jonathan Elliot, who has super-powers.

== Post-Crisis versions ==
The Fortress of Solitude in Adventures of Superman #461 (October 1989), art by Dan Jurgens.

In John Byrne's 1986 Man of Steel miniseries, which rewrote various aspects of the Superman mythos, the Clark Kent persona was described as a "Fortress of Solitude", in that it allowed him to live as the ordinary person he saw himself as and leave the world-famous superhero behind. This concept was often invoked in later stories, and one story featured Superman hiding his secret identity from a telepath behind a door identical to that of the pre-Crisis Fortress. By that time, however, a more physical Fortress had been reintroduced.

In Action Comics Annual #2 (1989), Superman, on a self-imposed exile to space, was entrusted with a Kryptonian artifact called the Eradicator, created by his ancestor Kem-El. Dedicated to preserving Krypton, this device built a new Fortress in the Antarctic as a precursor to recreating Krypton on Earth. Superman broke the Eradicator's control, but maintained the Fortress as a memorial for Krypton and a base of operations much like Batman's Batcave. The first appearance of this new post-Crisis version of the Fortress was in The Adventures of Superman #461 (December 1989).

It contained many artifacts from the post-Crisis version of Krypton, most notably a number of robot servitors (one of whom, Kelex, became a trusted confidant) and a battlesuit from the Third Age of Krypton.

Superman in the Fortress of Solitude on the variant cover of Action Comics #977 (June 2017), art by Gary Frank.

This Fortress was cast into the Phantom Zone as a result of a battle between Superman, Lex Luthor, and Dominus, a villain who played with Superman's mind and who was also trapped in the Phantom Zone. It did, however, serve as the template for the next Fortress, built by Steel, which was an extradimensional space accessed through a vast puzzle-globe. The now-mobile Fortress was relocated somewhere in the Andes.

In the DC One Million series (1998), Superman's Fortress of Solitude in the 853rd century resides within a tesseract located at the center of Earth's sun. By this time, Superman has lived in self-imposed exile within the Fortress for over 15,000 years.

During the "For Tomorrow" story arc, Wonder Woman breached the Fortress in an attempt to confront Superman, causing the Fortress to self-destruct. Superman subsequently established a new Fortress in an ancient temple in the Cordillera del Cóndor Mountains, on the border of Ecuador and Peru. This version of the Fortress is visually similar to the earliest "Secret Citadel" from Superman #17.

The final version of the post-Crisis Fortress was home to Krypto and his dog-sitter Ned (the last remaining Superman robot), and contained a version of Kandor, a portal to the Phantom Zone, Kryptonian and alien artifacts, and holographic images of Jor-El and Lara. The caretaker of the Fortress was Kelex, a Kryptonian robot that was a descendant of the Kelex robot that served Jor-El.

=== Infinite Crisis ===
In Infinite Crisis, several survivors of the pre-Crisis multiverse – the Earth-Two Superman (Kal-L), Lois Lane of Earth-Two, Superboy-Prime, and Earth-Three's Alexander Luthor Jr. – set up a base in the ruins of the Antarctic Fortress following their escape from the dimension they had been trapped in since the end of Crisis on Infinite Earths. It is revealed that Kal-L had a version of the Fortress of Solitude.

=== "One Year Later" ===
The Fortress of Solitude's interior in Action Comics Annual #10 (February 2007), art by Phil Jimenez.

In the 2006 story arc "Up, Up, and Away!", Superman recovered a piece of Kryptonian sunstone, which Lex Luthor had used to awaken an ancient Kryptonian warship. Superman learned that the sunstone had been sent with him from Krypton, and used it to construct a new Fortress in the Arctic. He nevertheless plans to restore the Peruvian Fortress, even if compromised and no longer in a secret location, and plans more Fortresses around the world. This version of the Fortress physically resembles the film and television depictions, and Superman communicates with Jor-El via crystal constructs as in the Superman film and Smallville.

=== The New 52 ===
The New 52 Fortress of Solitude

In The New 52 reboot of DC's continuity (launched in 2011) the Fortress of Solitude is first seen floating in space. It is later revealed to be the orbiting ship of Braniac which Superman had taken over after he physically reprogrammed the Collector of Worlds. This fortress is reported destroyed in the five years between the current Action Comics arc, and the New 52 present day, with the current fortress once more in the Arctic. In the New 52, Supergirl also has her own fortress, known as Sanctuary, and located in the depths of the ocean. Superman is revealed to have a fortress which he refers to as his "Yucatan base", a reference to his fortress in the Amazon rain forest in previous continuity.

Superman makes his way to the Fortress via a stolen motorcycle due to burning out his powers. The Fortress' security system does not recognize him due to his DNA changing and removed his armor. It was revealed months later Vandal Savage altered Superman's DNA to draw him from the Fortress. Savage later converged all of his forces on the Fortress itself and transported it to Metropolis. However, Superman was able to find a temporary 'cure' for his power loss by exposing himself to kryptonite as a form of 'chemotherapy' that burned away the radiation preventing his cells from absorbing energy. On the verge of death while trying to stop Savage, he is caught by the arm and shot in the lower abdomen. As he fell from the sky believing he was about to die, the kryptonite finished burning away the radiation. The Fortress scanned Superman, restored his powers, and returned his armor to him. After defeating Savage and his children, Superman moves the Fortress back to the Arctic Circle.

Several days after the crisis, Superman uses the Fortress's medical equipment and A.I technology to do a full physical on him and discovers that, as a result of Savage's actions using kryptonite to burn out his infected cells, he is dying and has mere weeks to live.

Following Superman's death, the pre-New 52 Superman gains access to the Fortress as both he and the deceased Superman share identical DNA, even though they are from separate timelines. Superman takes his deceased counterpart to the Fortress hoping to use the Regeneration Matrix to revive him, as the Eradicator did to him in his native timeline. In the New 52 universe of Prime Earth, no such technology exists. After burying his counterpart in Smallville, he returns to the Fortress and uses his heat vision to create a statue of Superman of Prime Earth to honor his fallen comrade.

The Eradicator of Pre-New 52 eventually arrives on Prime Earth and takes up residence within the Fortress.

== Other versions ==
=== All-Star Superman ===
In the out-of-continuity series All-Star Superman, the Fortress is once again located in the Arctic. Superman has replaced the giant key with a normal-sized key which is made from super-dense dwarf star material and weighs half a million tons, restricting its use to those with immense superhuman strength. It has a team of robots working on various projects. The Fortress itself contains the Titanic, the Space Shuttle Columbia, and a baby Sun-Eater, as well as larger-than-life memorabilia, similar to the objects found in the Batcave. It has various scientific facilities as well, including a time telescope that can receive brief cryptic messages with reception of limited quality from the future.

=== Earth One ===
In Superman: Earth One graphic novel series, the Fortress of Solitude was built by Superman's Kryptonian ship AI using the Arctic's cave system.

== Other media ==
=== Television ===
==== Animation ====
- The Fortress of Solitude appears in the Super Friends franchise.
- The Fortress of Solitude appears in series set in the DC Animated Universe (DCAU). This version contains an alien zoo housing alien life-forms saved from the Preserver's ship and some computer equipment as well as a sphere stolen from Brainiac that contains information about Krypton.
- The Fortress of Solitude appears in the Legion of Super Heroes episode "Message in a Bottle". This version is maintained by a robotic version of Superman (voiced by Yuri Lowenthal) who resembles Cyborg Superman.
- The Fortress of Solitude appears in the Batman: The Brave and the Bold episode "Battle of the Super-Heroes!".
- The Fortress of Solitude appears in Young Justice.
- The Fortress of Solitude appears in Justice League Action.
- The Fortress of Solitude appears in the Harley Quinn episode "Harlivy".
- The Fortress of Solitude appears in My Adventures with Superman. This version is located in Antarctica and was created from the ship that brought Superman to Earth.

==== Live-action ====
- The Fortress of Solitude is never mentioned in the 1950s TV series Adventures of Superman. The closest equivalent are cabins high in the mountains, in the first-season episode "The Stolen Costume" and the second-season episode "Superman in Exile".
- The Fortress of Solitude appears in Smallville. This version is created from the Crystal of Knowledge.
- The Fortress of Solitude appears in Supergirl.
- The Fortress of Solitude appears in Superman & Lois. This version is located in Qausuittuq National Park, near the Arctic Ocean.
- The Fortress of Solitude appears in Krypton.

=== Film ===
Superman Returns (2006) concept art

- The Fortress of Solitude appears in Superman (1978) and two of its three sequels. This version is created from a crystal that Jor-El enclosed in Kal-El's spaceship.
- The Fortress of Solitude appears in Superman Returns.
- The Fortress of Solitude appears in Superman: Doomsday.
- The Fortress of Solitude appears in Superman/Batman: Apocalypse.
- The Fortress of Solitude appears in All-Star Superman.
- The Fortress of Solitude appears in Superman: Unbound.
- The Fortress of Solitude appears in Superman vs. The Elite.
- The Fortress of Solitude appears in films set in the DC Extended Universe (DCEU). This version is a metaphorical depiction made up in Clark's head located at the top of a snowy mountain.
- The Fortress of Solitude appears in the DC Animated Movie Universe (DCAMU) films The Death of Superman and Reign of the Supermen. This version was created by the Eradicator using Superman's spaceship, in order to resurrect the latter.
- The Fortress of Solitude appears in films set in the DC Universe (DCU) Superman (2025) and Supergirl (2026). This version is located in Antarctica and is inspired from the versions of the 1978 movie and the All-Star Superman miniseries.

=== Video games ===
- The Fortress of Solitude appears in The Death and Return of Superman.
- The Fortress of Solitude appears in Mortal Kombat vs. DC Universe.
- The Fortress of Solitude appears in DC Universe Online.
- The Fortress of Solitude appears as a stage in the Injustice series.
- The Fortress of Solitude appears in Scribblenauts Unmasked: A DC Comics Adventure.
- The Fortress of Solitude appears in Lego Batman 3: Beyond Gotham.
