= Steel (John Henry Irons) =

DC Comics superhero

- John Henry Irons as Steel as he appeared on the cover of Steel (vol. 2) #0 (August 1994). Art by Jon Bogdanove and Dennis Janke.

Publication information
- Publisher: DC Comics
- First appearance: The Adventures of Superman #500 (June 1993)
- Created by: Louise Simonson; Jon Bogdanove

In-story information
- Alter ego: Dr. John Henry Irons II
- Team affiliations: Steelworks; Justice League; AmerTek Industries; S.T.A.R. Labs; Infinity, Inc. Supermen of America; Suicide Squad; Superman Family
- Notable aliases: The Man of Steel
- Abilities: See list: Currently: Genius engineer and inventor Powered armor grants: Superhuman strength, durability, and endurance Flight Various other cybernetic armaments Variety of communication and sensor arrays Wields seemingly indestructible mallet Formerly: Living steel Bulletproof stainless steel skin Ability to generate heat and become fluid molten steel

Steel is a fictional superhero appearing in American comic books published by DC Comics. He is a genius engineer who builds a mechanized suit of armor that mirrors Superman's powers. Steel initially seeks to replace Superman, who has been killed by Doomsday. After Superman is resurrected, he accepts Steel as an ally. Steel's sledgehammer and real name of John Henry Irons are references to the mythical railroad worker John Henry. He has a niece named Natasha Irons who is also a superhero with similar steel armor.

The character is portrayed by Shaquille O'Neal in the 1997 film adaptation of the same name and Wolé Parks in the television series Superman & Lois. Additionally, Michael Dorn, Phil LaMarr, Zeno Robinson, and Byron Marc Newsome have voiced the character in animation.

== Publication history ==
First appearing in The Adventures of Superman #500 (June 1993), he is the second character known as Steel and was created by Louise Simonson and artist Jon Bogdanove. Aspects of the character are inspired by the African American folk hero John Henry, as well as Superman.

== Fictional character biography ==
=== The Death of Superman ===
John Henry Irons as "Man of Steel", as seen in the "Reign of the Supermen" story arc. Art by Jon Bogdanove and Dennis Janke.

John Henry Irons is a weapons engineer for AmerTek Industries who designed the BG-60, a portable energy cannon. After gangsters and criminals obtain the BG-60 and use it for evil, Irons fakes his death and flees to Metropolis. While working on a construction site, Irons falls off a building and almost dies, but Superman saves him.

The various incarnations of Steel, on the cover for Superman: The Man of Steel #117. Art by Doug Mahnke

The story arc "The Death of Superman" sees the rise of four "Supermen" who seek to replace Superman after he is killed by Doomsday: the Eradicator, Cyborg Superman, Superboy, and Irons. The four are differentiated with nicknames previously applied to Superman. Irons is referred to as the "Man of Steel", which is later shortened to "Steel". After Superman is resurrected, he allows Steel and Superboy to continue operating as heroes, expressing pride in what Irons had done with his second chance.

=== Steel series ===
Steel was spun off into a solo series, written by co-creator Louise Simonson and later by Christopher Priest, from 1994 to 1998. The series involves John Henry Irons returning to Washington, D.C. five years after his departure. Steel's family was introduced in this series: his grandparents Butter and Bess, his sister-in-law Blondell, and her five children: Jemahl, Natasha, Paco, Tyke, and Darlene (the latter two being foster children).

Steel's early adventures pit him against AmerTek and against the gangs that were using his weapons. His nephew, Jemahl, is involved in one of the gangs, which he believes offers him protection. Tyke is paralyzed by a bullet meant for Jemahl and Blondell is assaulted. Steel eventually takes down AmerTek and the gangs, and focused on who was helping AmerTek distribute the weapons. This led him to track down a group called Black Ops, led by the villain Hazard.

Tyke, frustrated and angered by his handicap, reveals Irons' secret identity to men working with Hazard. Hazard unleashes a cyborg named Hardwire, who attacks the Irons family and seriously wounds Butter. Child protective services take Tyke and Darlene away, with Tyke ending up in Hazard's custody. During Steel's battle with Hardwire, he is forced to remove his armor to save his life, revealing his identity to the public. Various villains attack the Irons family, during which Irons' grandmother Bess is killed and the family is forced to go into hiding.

The title received a shakeup when Christopher Priest became the lead writer in issue #34. Steel relocated to Jersey City, New Jersey with Natasha and began to work at Garden State Medical Center. He built a new suit of armor that was significantly less powerful than its predecessor. The series was canceled after issue #52, which featured Steel running the hospital after the unmasking of its previous coordinator, Villain.

=== JLA and the Men of Steel ===
Around the time the Steel series was cancelled, Steel is recruited into the Justice League due to Batman's concern that the League was already top-heavy in brawn and required more thinkers. During his time in the League, Steel played a crucial role in the defeat of villains such as Prometheus and Queen Bee. He even served as the leader of the reserve team—consisting of Huntress, Big Barda, Plastic Man, and Zauriel—left in the present during the DC One Million event. Following the battle against Mageddon, he ceased to serve as a full-time member of the League, although he stayed on as a supporting member for quite some time. He also became a regular member in the Superman titles, having relocated with Nat to Metropolis to run his own workshop there, called "Steelworks". He also revealed at this time that he had known Superman's identity for some time.

Steel retires from active duty during the "Our Worlds at War" event after he is injured and the Entropy Aegis armor nearly consumes his soul. During his retirement, Irons creates a suit of armor for his niece Natasha, who became the new Steel.

=== 52 ===
John Henry Irons returns as Steel during the Infinite Crisis event. He is unknowingly subjected to Lex Luthor's metagene therapy, giving him the ability to transform into living steel. John attacks Luthor, but is stopped by Natasha. After investigating Luthor's Everyman Project, John learns that the metagene therapy is temporary and was intended to test the effects of the process.

=== Infinity, Inc. ===
Steel is one of the main characters of the second volume of Infinity Inc., which debuted in September 2007. Natasha Irons is revealed to have been subjected to the Everyman Project, giving her the ability to transform into living mist. Natasha, Mercy Graves, and several other victims of the Everyman Project found a new incarnation of Infinity, Inc.

=== Reign of Doomsday ===
In January 2011, Steel featured in a one-shot comic written by Steve Lyons. Sean Chen was initially announced as the artist, but due to scheduling problems, Ed Benes took over the art duties. Steel finds himself the only person who can defend Metropolis from an attack by Doomsday. During the battle, Doomsday inexplicably develops metallic armor and the power of flight, countering Steel's own abilities, and manages to capture him. Steel awakens in a dimensional prison with Superboy, Supergirl, the Eradicator, and Hank Henshaw/Cyborg Superman, all of whom have been captured by Doomsday. The five explore the prison and learn that they were captured by clones of Doomsday created by Lex Luthor to distract Earth's heroes while he sought the power of the Black Lantern Ring, with each Doomsday clone designed to eliminate a specific target.

=== The New 52 ===
In The New 52 continuity reboot, John Henry Irons is a scientist working on the government's "Steel Soldier" program. He retaliates and quits his job after seeing Lex Luthor mistreat Superman. When John Corben goes on a rampage after donning the government's "Metal 0" suit, John Henry aids Superman in fighting him off by using his own prototype armor for the first time, uploading a virus into the Metal 0 suit that he designed specifically to shut it down in the event of the user going rogue.

=== DC Rebirth ===
In 2016, DC Comics implemented a relaunch of its books called "DC Rebirth", which restored its continuity to a form much as it was prior to The New 52. Steel now protects Metropolis alongside his girlfriend Lana Lang.

The New Golden Age reveals that Steel has a great-uncle who was also named John Henry Irons (making Steel's real name John Henry Irons II) and who operated as a racial freedom fighter called John Henry Jr., taking up the mantle of the late John Wilson/John Henry from DC: The New Frontier who was now canonical to the main DC continuity. After being transported to the present day, John Henry Jr. meets his grandnephew and his great-grandniece Natasha.

== Powers and abilities ==
John Henry Irons is a master engineer and a natural athlete who frequently displays an impressive degree of strength. In addition, he wears a suit of powered armor which grants him flight, enhanced strength, and endurance. Steel modified his suit many times through his career. The initial "Man of Steel" design was armed with a wrist-mounted rivet gun and the sledgehammer (like the one used by his namesake John Henry) that was ubiquitous for most of his designs. The original design on his breastplate featured a metal version of Superman's "S" insignia, which Irons removed after the return of Superman. Two later armor designs incorporated a similar, but different, "S" symbol. A large hammer is also a key weapon in the suit's arsenal. Irons' current "smart hammer" hits harder the farther it is thrown, is capable of independent flight, and has an on-board computer guidance and analysis system capable of detecting stress points.

When he wore the Entropy Aegis, he had god-like strength and durability and could enlarge himself to giant size. He also had the ability of flight due to energy wings, could travel through time and space at will, and could fire blasts of energy that would reduce a target to its composite elements. However, the Aegis made him very violent and slowly erased his soul.

During the 52 event, John Henry Irons was altered by the Everyman Project and temporarily became a metahuman with the ability to transform into living stainless steel.

== Enemies ==
- Alter – A detective that developed the ability to turn into a hulking monster with super-strength, claws, and invulnerability. The side-effect left him with a multiple personality disorder.
- Amalgam – A criminal with a cybernetic arm.
- AmerTek Industries – An industrial military firm that John Henry Irons used to work for.
  - Thomas Weston – A colonel and weapons developer who runs AmerTek Industries.
- Arthur Villain – A surgeon and administrator at Garden Valley Medical Center.
- Ba'ad – A cyborg mercenary from the planet Kreno.
- Black Ops – A criminal organization.
  - Hazard – Manuel Cabral is the cybernetic-enhanced head of Rainforest Technologies who is the leader of Black Ops.
  - Hardsell – A member of Black Ops with invulnerability and super-strength.
  - Hotspot – A pyrokinetic member of Black Ops who also possesses flight and intangibility.
  - Mainline – A member of Black Ops with energy projection, flight, and super-speed.
  - Quake – A member of Black Ops who can perform shock waves.
  - Shellshock – A female member of Black Ops with super-strength.
  - Split – A member of Black Ops with teleportation.
- Blockbuster – A super-strong crime boss.
- Central Avenue Skulls – A street gang that operated on Central Avenue and wield Toastmaster weapons.
  - Cowboy – The leader of the Central Avenue Skulls.
- Chindi – Russell Wolf is a man whose suit enables him to possess super-strength, enhanced durability, flight, and force field projection.
- Crash – Clay Irons is the brother of John Henry Irons.
- Deadline – A phasing assassin who targeted Steel once.
- Doctor Polaris – A magnetic supervillain.
- East Street Skulls – A street gang that operated on Central Avenue who are rivals of the Central Avenue Skulls and rely on the drug Tar to enhance their strengths.
- Parasite – An energy-draining supervillain.
- Plasmus – A protoplasmic supervillain.
- Queen Tech'tra – The ruler of the Krenon Empire.
- Skorpio – A physician who became the bodyguard of Arthur Villain and wears a special suit.
- White Rabbit – A female arms dealer.
  - Bug – A minion of White Rabbit who can create a distortion field.
  - Default – A minion of White Rabbit who can teleport.
  - Digit – A size-shifting minion of White Rabbit.
  - Firebomb – A minion of White Rabbit with pyrokinesis and intangibility. Because he has no physical body, Firebomb wears a special suit to interact physically with his surroundings.
  - Gearhead – A minion of White Rabbit.
  - Jitter – A minion of White Rabbit who can create circular portals.
  - Worm – A minion of White Rabbit who can create virtual doppelgängers of himself.

== Other versions ==
=== DC: The New Frontier ===
An African American man inspired by Irons' folk hero namesake named John Wilson appears in the alternate universe series DC: The New Frontier in issue #4. He dons a black hood secured by a hangman's noose and starts wielding a sledgehammer to avenge his family, who were murdered by the Ku Klux Klan, only to be killed by them. A young alternate universe version of John Henry Irons himself (wearing a jersey with his surname on the back) makes a cameo appearance in DC: The New Frontier #6, reading comics by Wilson's grave.

=== Kingdom Come ===
An alternate universe version of Steel appears in Kingdom Come #2. This version joined forces with Batman following Superman's self-imposed exile. As such, Irons adopted a darker suit and a bat-shaped axe. He is later killed amidst a war between Batman's army, Superman's Justice League, and a group of metahuman prisoners.

=== "Hyper-Tension" ===
An alternate reality version of Steel appears in Superboy (vol. 3) #62. This version joined Black Zero in his war for clone rights.

=== "Steel: Crucible of Freedom" ===
An alternate universe version of John Henry Irons inspired by his folk hero namesake appears in Steel Annual #1. This version is a slave and blacksmith who builds a suit of armor for his master to fight in the Civil War. However, Henry is forced to wear it himself due to it not fitting his master. Nonetheless, he successfully leads his fellow slaves in revolt. He would go on to continue fighting for other slaves' freedom and travel the expanding United States before fading into folklore.

=== Superman vs. the Terminator: Death to the Future ===
A possible future version of Steel appears in Superman vs. the Terminator: Death to the Future. This version comes from a future where he had joined John Connor's resistance against Skynet. Despite his old age, Irons was able to lend his intelligence to Connor's fight and outfitted his hammer with a voice-activation and anti-gravity unit.

=== JLA/Avengers ===
Steel makes a minor appearance in JLA/Avengers.

=== Absolute Universe ===
An alternate universe version of John Henry Irons/Steel appears in Absolute Superman. This version is an underpaid engineer who as a child built a high tech helmet and sold it to Lazarus Corp, who never paid him for the invention. Years later, Irons builds an homemade flight suit and a powerful hammer in his car and storms Lazarus to kill its leader, Ra's al Ghul. When Ra's is killed by the reawakened Teth-Adam, Irons joins Superman in fighting him.

== In other media ==
=== Television ===
Steel as he appears in Superman: The Animated Series

- John Henry Irons / Steel appears in series set in the DC Animated Universe (DCAU). This version lacks his comics counterpart's shield and cape and wields wrist-mounted lasers instead of rivet guns.
  - Irons first appears in Superman: The Animated Series, voiced by Michael Dorn. Introduced in the episode "Prototype", he works as a designer for LexCorp and is tasked with creating prototype powered armor for the Metropolis Police Department's Special Crimes Unit. However, the suit's neural interface system has adverse psychological effects on its user, Sgt. Corey Mills. Encouraged by Superman, Irons works to perfect the suit with the help of his niece Natasha. In the episode "Heavy Metal", having resigned from LexCorp, he becomes the superhero Steel and helps Superman fight Metallo.
  - Steel appears in Justice League Unlimited, voiced by Phil LaMarr. As of this series, he has joined the Justice League.
- John Henry Irons / Steel appears in Young Justice, voiced by Zeno Robinson. This version is a member of the Justice League.
- John Henry Irons appears in Superman & Lois, portrayed by Wolé Parks. Introduced as "Captain Luthor", this version is from an unidentified alternate Earth that was ravaged by an army of evil Kryptonians engineered by his Earth's Morgan Edge and led by his Earth's Superman. Additionally, Irons was married to his Earth's Lois Lane and has a daughter named Natalie. After Lane was killed by Superman for publicly exposing the Kryptonians' weakness to Kryptonite, Irons and Natalie built a suit of armor, incorporated an A.I. (voiced by Daisy Tormé) that he took from his Earth's Lex Luthor, and armed it with a kinetic hammer. While testing a new weapon that could potentially kill Superman, Irons is transported to the primary Earth's Smallville, where he initially battles before eventually befriending its version of Superman and helps him battle his versions of Morgan Edge, Ally Allston, Intergang, and Doomsday throughout the series. Moreover, he helps Natalie acclimate after she arrives from their native Earth and goes on to marry Lana Lang.
  - Furthermore, a picture of Parks is used to represent the "prime" version of Irons, who was a specialist in counterinsurgency and was killed in action by Intergang years prior. Additionally, he has a sister named Darlene Irons (portrayed by Angel Parker) who works as a physician.
- John Henry Irons / Steel appears in My Adventures with Superman, voiced by Byron Marc Newsome. This version is initially the lead engineer at AmerTek Industries and colleague of Silas Stone before he was fired after speaking out against CEO Thomas Weston's "Amer-Fusion" reactor. Additionally, Irons developed the Steel mech suit for use by first responders.
  - In a potential future depicted in the episode "All's Fair in Love and W.O.R.M.S.", Irons is killed by Hank Henshaw's forces, after sending Superman and Lois Lane's son, Jon Kent, back in time.

=== Film ===
- John Henry Irons / Steel appears in a self-titled film, portrayed by Shaquille O'Neal. The film was originally meant to be a spin-off of a new Superman film based on "The Death of Superman" storyline, which first introduced Irons as Steel in the comics. However, the project separated from the Superman mythos and languished in development hell, causing it to be moved forward without the film it was meant to be attached to. This version designed weapons for the United States military until he resigned when his partner Susan Sparks was crippled in a sonic cannon incident caused by soldier Nathaniel Burke. Irons develops a suit of armor to help combat the weapon sales that Burke was involved with.
- A young John Henry Irons makes a cameo appearance in Justice League: The New Frontier.
- John Henry Irons / Steel appears in films set in the DC Animated Movie Universe (DCAMU), voiced initially by Khary Payton and subsequently by Cress Williams. This version is a S.T.A.R. Labs scientist.
- An alternate universe version of John Henry Irons appears in Justice League: Gods and Monsters, voiced again by Khary Payton. This version is a scientist involved in LexCorp's "Project Fair Play", which is meant to counter their universe's Justice League. After three of their fellow scientists are killed, Irons and the others involved attempt to regroup until they are all attacked and killed by the Metal Men.
- Steel makes a non-speaking cameo appearance in Teen Titans Go! To the Movies.

=== Video games ===
- Steel appears as a playable character in The Death and Return of Superman.
- Steel appears in Superman: The Man of Steel, voiced by Billy Brown.
- Steel appears in DC Universe Online, voiced by Ken Thomas.
- Steel appears as a character summon in Scribblenauts Unmasked: A DC Comics Adventure.

=== Miscellaneous ===
- John Henry Irons appears in Superman Lives!, voiced by Leon Hebert.
- The DCAU incarnation of Steel appears in Justice League Unlimited #2.
- An alternate universe version of Steel was originally slated to appear in the second season of Justice League: Gods and Monsters Chronicles before it was cancelled.

== See also ==
- Hardware (character) – Fictional superhero
- Iron Man – Marvel Comics superhero
