= Brett Breeding =

American artist

- Breeding at GalaxyCon St Louis in 2026
- Born: June 13, 1961 (age 65) Wilmington, Delaware, U.S.
- Areas: Penciller, Inker, Colourist
- Notable works: The Amazing Spider-Man; The Mighty Thor; Action Comics "The Death of Superman"; Superman: The Man of Tomorrow; Avengers Next
- Collaborators: Ron Frenz; Dan Jurgens
- Awards: Inkwell Awards Joe Sinnott Hall of Fame

Brett Breeding (born June 13, 1961) is an American comic book artist who was active in the industry in the 1980s and 1990s, primarily as an inker. He is most well known for his work on the DC Comics character Superman.

A freelancer, Breeding worked for both DC and Marvel Comics during his career, penciling covers and stories in various comics, but mostly focusing on "finish inking" over breakdown layouts. Breeding has worked extensively with pencilers Ron Frenz and Dan Jurgens, and is the co-creator of the character Doomsday, as well as Shadowdragon, Saviour, and Blaze and Satanus.

== Biography ==
=== Early career ===
Breeding got his first professional comics work three months after graduating high school in 1979 as Bob Layton's background assistant. He started out inking backgrounds on the popular David Michelinie/Layton first run of Iron Man, and also worked on the 1981 intercompany crossover book Superman and Spider-Man.

Breeding began his career at DC Comics in 1980 on Weird War Tales, moving on to The Superman Family and Green Arrow backup stories, and eventually working with Don Heck and George Pérez on Justice League of America.

=== Marvel Comics ===
Breeding moved to Marvel in late 1980 where he worked regularly through 1987. His first stint as a regular inker at Marvel was on The Avengers, in 1982–1983. Breeding inked Bob Hall on the four-issue limited series West Coast Avengers, published in 1984. Also in 1984, he teamed for the first time with Ron Frenz on The Amazing Spider-Man issue #252, the first appearance of Spider-Man's black suit. In 1985–1986, he started regularly working on the Spider-Man titles, beginning with The Spectacular Spider-Man storyline "The Death of Jean DeWolff"; and then moving to The Amazing Spider-Man with Ron Frenz, and began regularly providing finishing inks. In 1987–1988 he and Frenz moved as a team onto Thor. In the late 1980s, he inked most issues of Thundercats, published by the Marvel imprint Star Comics.

=== Superman ===
In 1986, starting with the Superman Annual #1, Breeding began his long association with Superman, providing finish inks over Ron Frenz's layouts and then re-teaming with Frenz in 1987 for Superman Annual #2. In 1988, he was hired by Superman editor Mike Carlin to provide finishing pencils over George Pérez's rough layouts and finished inks on Action Comics. While waiting for Pérez to begin work on Action Comics, Breeding started his first regular Superman work on Superman #26 with penciller Kerry Gammill, moving to Action Comics with Pérez on issue #643.

Working regularly on the Superman titles for over a decade, Breeding at one time or another worked on all the titles in the line, starting with Superman, then Adventures of Superman, and Action Comics; and he was one of the inkers on the first issue of the long-running Superman title Superman: The Man of Steel. In 1991, Breeding moved to finish inking Superman until 1993. During that time, Breeding was the primary finish inker (over Dan Jurgens' breakdowns) on the seminal 1992 Superman story-lines "The Death of Superman" and "The Return of Superman" followed by the popular prestige format limited series Superman/Doomsday: Hunter/Prey. Breeding worked with Jurgens many times over the years, including the titles Adventures of Superman, Metal Men, Superman, and various entries in Who's Who in the DC Universe. He finish-inked the first eleven issues of Superman: The Man of Tomorrow (over Tom Grummett and Paul Ryan, respectively), published in 1995–1998. Breeding also contributed to the 1996 landmark one-shot Superman: The Wedding Album.

In 1998, Breeding returned to Marvel Comics to work once again with long-time collaborator and friend Ron Frenz on Avengers Next.

=== Digital Rainbow Images ===
After leaving regular work in the comics industry in 2000, Breeding set up the company Digital Rainbow Images, which also highlighted his wildlife photography.

=== Licensing work ===
Cover Art for Superman: Toppling Titano, art by Ron Frenz and Brett Breeding

In 2005, Breeding returned to comics work, now working for DC's Licensing Department providing finish inks, and frequently pencilling, art for licensed products, toy packaging, as well as animation and sculptor turnarounds and creating style guides for their various characters. While working for DC Licensing, he designed, penciled and inked nearly 100 character turnarounds, many specifically for Mattel's DC Universe Classics action figure line. The "hand" illustration used in the Mattel DC Universe Classics 4 figure line "bubble-hand" packaging is an inked rendering of Breeding's own hand, fingerprints not included.

In late 2010, early 2011, Breeding was commissioned by DC's Licensing Publishing Department to create complete art for the book Draw the DC Universe, published by Klutz Press. Many of the illustrations included are based on works by other artists, as directed by the publishers.

When DC closed down their licensing department at the end of 2010, Breeding moved to Warner Brothers Consumer Products, continuing to produce the same types of character art and style guides that he previously created for DC Licensing. In addition to the WBCP Style Guide work, in 2012 Breeding began work for Warner Brothers Global Publishing, producing full artwork (pencils, inks, digital coloring and animations) for a series of Classic Superman interactive storybook apps for the iPad. Breeding commissioned Ron Frenz to provide the storytelling breakdowns for all the apps. The first two stories, Superman: Toppling Titano and Superman and Bizarro Save the Planet, were released as E-books in June 2013, to be released as fully interactive apps in the near future. Breeding also worked on the third and fourth installments; Superman and Supergirl vs. Chemo and a Superman/Batman team-up. In late 2013, he produced storybooks highlighting The New 52 versions of the DC characters.

Preceded by Dan Green	Avengers inker 1982–1983	Succeeded by Joe Sinnott
Preceded by Sal Buscema	Thor inker 1987–1988	Succeeded by Don Heck
Preceded by multiple	Action Comics inker 1989–1991	Succeeded by Bob McLeod
Preceded by Dennis Janke	Superman inker 1992–1993	Succeeded by Josef Rubinstein
Preceded by N/A	Superman: The Man of Tomorrow inker 1995–1998	Succeeded by Dennis Janke
