= The Death and Return of Superman =

1994 video game

- Cover art
- Developer: Blizzard Entertainment
- Publishers: Sunsoft; Acclaim Entertainment (PAL Mega Drive)
- Designer: Dan MacArthur
- Programmers: James Edward Anhalt III; Allen Adham; Bob Fitch
- Artists: Samwise Didier; David Berggren; Roman Kenney; Joeyray Hall; Stuart Rose; Ronald Millar Sr.
- Composers: Michael Morhaime, Glenn Stafford (SNES); Eric Swanson (GEN/MD)
- Platforms: Super NES, Sega Genesis
- Release: Super NES; August 1994; Sega Genesis; January 1995
- Genre: Beat 'em up
- Mode: Single-player

The Death and Return of Superman is a side-scrolling beat 'em up video game released by Sunsoft for the Super NES and Genesis. It is based on "The Death of Superman" comic book storyline by DC Comics and features many characters from the comics, including Superman himself, Superboy, Steel, Cyborg Superman, the Eradicator, and Doomsday. All of the five Supermen are playable characters at some point.

Gameplay, and visually, the Genesis and Super NES versions are near identical, however, each version's soundtracks are radically different from one another.

== Gameplay ==
Gameplay consists of standard beat 'em up sections.

The Death and Return of Superman has standard "beat 'em up" gameplay, in which the player controls a character that can move in all directions. A set number of foes will enter the screen and only after they are defeated can the character continue on the quest. Although different in appearance, each character has the same basic abilities: standard melee attacks (punches), grappling attacks (get close enough to character and attack), throws (holding the forward key and attacking), grab and throw upward (holding the "up" key and attacking), grab and throw backward (holding the "back" key and attacking), or grab and pummel (hold the "down" key and attack), a projectile attack, and a special attack that destroys all standard enemies on the screen. Their attacks only slightly vary, mostly in range and appearance.

Each Superman has the ability to fly and can thereby avoid certain characters or obstacles using this ability. There are also characters that have the ability to fly and are thereby easier to defeat if confronted in the air. There are also certain areas and levels where flying is mandatory. Also, many obstacles can be passed only by flying. However, certain screens in which the character is on an elevated platform, the flying ability is negated.

With the exceptions of Superman and to a point the Man of Steel, each character has two standard types of level: melee combat and flying in which only projectile moves can be used. The standard melee levels consist of the character fighting through "common" enemies and ending the level with a fight with a "boss" character. When playing the flying levels, the player can move the character anywhere in the screen while firing the character's projectile move at greatly weakened enemies. No boss characters appear in these levels. Strangely, Superman never has a flying level and instead plays through three standard melee levels. Steel has a unique flying level that plays more like a combat level as he does not use his projectile attacks and relies on his melee attack. Also, Steel has a "boss" character he must defeat in order for the game to progress.

Choice of characters is not allowed during the game and the player must play through the game as a pre-determined character for each level.

During the start of the game, enemies are usually armed with guns, bombs, or chainsaws. Later characters are armed with more powerful energy type weapons and pure melee characters are now robots. Most characters appear time and time again and more powerful enemies use the same game sprite but with a different color.

== Plot ==
The game starts when Clawster and his army and Underworlders initiate a power failure in Metropolis in an attempt to take over the city. Superman intervenes and defeats the horde of Underdwellers, Clawster included. Not long after the power is restored, a news report bulletin states a monster of unknown origin (Doomsday) is leading a path of destruction towards Metropolis, and the Justice League were unable to stop the creature. The titanic struggle between Superman and Doomsday reached a conclusion when the two delivered each other the killing blow. Superman succumbs to his injuries as he dies, as well as Doomsday.

Three months later, four Supermen emerge in an effort to replace the original Superman, whilst the other claiming he is indeed the original Superman. The game shifts to Cyborg Superman (the "Man of Tomorrow") as he attacks a Project Cadmus base to locate a comatose Doomsday. Fearing he would be a threat once again if he wakes up, Cyborg Superman exiles Doomsday in deep space. Next, the player controls the Eradicator (the "Last Son of Krypton") as he patrols the streets of Metropolis. However, he is forced into battle with another Superman, Steel, as the armored hero fights to prevent the Last Son of Krypton from killing enemies. After the two Supermen fought to a standstill, the Eradicator reconsiders his brutal approach to fighting crime after Steel tells him it takes humanity and compassion to be considered a Superman.

Soon after, a bigger threat comes, as a mysterious spacecraft arrives and obliterates Coast City. The Eradicator investigates the situation, only to run in with the mastermind, Cyborg Superman. The Eradicator is critically injured at Cyborg Superman's hands, and rushes to the Fortress of Solitude. The game shifts its focus on Superboy (the "Metropolis Kid") as he attempts to handle the situation in Metropolis. After successfully doing so, Superboy flies off to Coast City, doing battle with Cyborg Superman as he arrives. Cyborg Superman knocks out and imprisons Superboy in the spacecraft. There, the rogue Superman reveals his plan: to destroy the world and reconstruct it in his image, starting with Coast City and Metropolis. While this is going on, a being flies among the skies above the Fortress of Solitude, albeit weakly. Back in Coast City, Superboy escapes imprisonment to go back to Metropolis, where he and Steel encounter the real Superman. Not wanting to wait, Superboy convinces the two to go with him to Coast City to stop Cyborg Superman once and for all.

The player now controls Steel (the "Man of Steel") as he, Superman, and Superboy launch an assault on Engine City. Cyborg Superman launches a missile set to destroy Metropolis. Superboy elects to stop the missile, and, with player controlling Superboy, he successfully destroys the missile. At Engine City, the player shifts back to Steel as he enters the Engine's core to shut it down. Meanwhile, a regenerated Eradicator bursts out of the Fortress and arrives at Engine City to help a weakened Superman, who is at Cyborg Superman's mercy. Cyborg Superman shoots kryptonite at Superman but the Eradicator arrives and shields Superman from the blast. This alters the deadly effects of the kryptonite and restores Superman to full strength as the Eradicator dies. Now controlling Superman, the player defeats and destroys Cyborg Superman. The game ends with Steel and Superboy congratulating Superman for his success and accepting him as the real Superman.

== Reception ==
Reception

Aggregate score
| Aggregator | Score | |
| Aggregator | Sega Genesis | SNES |
|---|---|---|
| GameRankings | 48% | 59% |

Review scores
| Publication | Score | |
| Publication | Sega Genesis | SNES |
|---|---|---|
| AllGame | 3.5/5 | 3.5/5 |
| Electronic Gaming Monthly | 28/50 | 6/10, 6/10, 5/10, 5/10 |
| Game Informer | N/A | 8/10 |
| GamePro | 14.5/20 | 18.5/20 |
| Hyper | N/A | 30% |
| M! Games | 49% | N/A |
| Mega Fun | 72% | N/A |
| Next Generation | 2/5 | N/A |
| Nintendo Power | N/A | 14.6/20 |
| Player One | 50% | N/A |
| Superjuegos | 64/100 | N/A |
| Total! | N/A | 79/100 |
| Video Games (DE) | 61% | 69% |
| VideoGames & Computer Entertainment | 8/10 | 8/10 |
| Electronic Games | N/A | B− |
| Games World | N/A | 75% |
| MegaZone | N/A | N/A |
| Super Console | N/A | 85/100 |

Award
| Publication | Award |
|---|---|
| Electronic Games | Best Video Game |

In a retrospective review, Brett Weiss of AllGame reviewed the SNES version and gave a rating of 3.5 out of 5 stars. He praised the graphics being colorful and realistic, the game music and sound effects and said the game is a typical action/platform game with nothing new to add to the genre.

IGN placed the SNES version 81st in their Top 100 SNES Games of All Time. In 2018, Complex ranked the game 100th on their The Best Super NES Games of All Time.
