= Cyborg Superman =

DC Comics fictional character

- Hank Henshaw as the original Cyborg Superman on a variant cover of Action Comics #1055 (May 2023). Art by Sebastian Fiumara.

Publication information
- Publisher: DC Comics
- First appearance: As Hank Henshaw: The Adventures of Superman #465 (May 1990); As Cyborg Superman: The Adventures of Superman #500 (June 1993)
- Created by: Dan Jurgens

In-story information
- Alter ego: Henry "Hank" Henshaw
- Species: Cyborg
- Team affiliations: NASA; Sinestro Corps; Manhunters; Warworld; Alpha Lanterns
- Notable aliases: Superman; Grandmaster; Cyborg
- Abilities: List: Genius-level intellect; Technomorphing; Mechanical body derived from Kryptonian technology and organic parts genetically similar to Superman grants the following: Kryptonian-like physiology; superhuman strength, stamina, durability, speed, agility, reflexes, and hearing; Flight, ice and wind breath, and heat vision; Enhanced visions; ultraviolet vision, microscopic vision, x-ray vision, telescopic vision, and infrared vision

Cyborg Superman (Hank Henshaw) is a supervillain appearing in American comic books published by DC Comics. Created by writer-artist Dan Jurgens, the character appears as both a primary enemy of Superman and an adversary of the Green Lantern Corps. Hank Henshaw was originally an astronaut whose tragic exposure to radiation deteriorates his body and transformed him into a energy being and kills his wife, a fellow crew member. A former fan of Superman, he irrationally blames him for the incident and sought to defame him, creating a robotic body derived from Kryptonian technology and genetic material of Superman. Over time, the character evolved into an enemy of the Green Lantern Corps, primarily due to leading the Manhunters.

Cyborg Superman has been adapted in several forms of media since his publication. He first appeared in the 2015 series Supergirl, portrayed by David Harewood. He also appears in My Adventures with Superman, voiced by Max Mittelman.

== Publication history ==
The Hank Henshaw version of Superman first appeared in The Adventures of Superman #465 (April 1990), and was created by Dan Jurgens. The story was a dark pastiche of the Fantastic Four, with astronauts being mutated by cosmic rays, only for in Jurgens' words, "a tragic, rather than heroic, result". This was later referenced in the 1999 crossover Superman/Fantastic Four, where Henshaw notes the similarities and serves as a replacement for Mister Fantastic during his absence. Originally intended as a one-shot, once the story was finished Jurgens "thought there might be more to play with — that there was an interesting character we shouldn't let go of yet", leading to his reinvention as Cyborg Superman in the Reign of the Supermen storyline. In 2015, as DC started a new continuity with The New 52, Jurgens tried to give a new origin for Henshaw and his subsequent transformation into the Cyborg, considering that the Fantastic Four parallels were better off as "a single event, never referred to again", and that "it's much more fair to the everyone—including all the characters involved—if the stories are distanced."

== Fictional character biography ==
Left: Hank Henshaw and the Excalibur crew after being exposed to the radiation. Right: Henshaw as his body decays, art by Dan Jurgens.

Astronaut Hank Henshaw and members of his Excalibur crew, including his wife Terri, were exposed to radiation from a solar flare and crash landed. With his body deteriorating but becoming a being of energy, he attempts to visit his wife (who seemed unharmed) in a different form, but is rejected. Blaming Superman for the ordeal, Henshaw recreates himself in Superman's image after his death by Doomsday by using the birthing matrix that carried Superman as an infant, granting him organic parts genetically resembling Superman and impersonated him.

First among the various Supermen to replace the Man of Steel following his death (alongside Steel, Superboy, and Eradicator), Henshaw works with Mongul to destroy Coast City and frame Superman. Eventually, he is defeated by the genuine Superman, who has returned from the dead.

Henshaw re-emerges as a galactic threat after becoming the new Grandmaster of the Manhunters, upgrading them with Kryptonian technology and organic material. Allowing them to rebuild for unknown reasons as part of his plan, Henshaw is defeated when Biot, the Manhunters' home planet, explodes. His head remains and is brought to Oa, where he is interrogated for knowledge of the Manhunters and the multiverse. After their invasion of Oa, Henshaw's head is taken by the Sinestro Corps to Qward. Henshaw reconstructs his cyborg body and joins the Sinestro Corps, hoping that the Anti-Monitor can kill him and allow him to rest in peace. When the Green Lantern Corps detonate Warworld and the central power battery of the Sinestro Corps to destroy the Anti-Monitor, Henshaw allows himself to be trapped behind a shield and is grievously injured in the explosion. His head is recovered by the Manhunters, who reactivate him.

Henshaw returns to work with the Alpha Lanterns as they attempt to augment every Green Lantern into an Alpha and coerces Ganthet to aid in reversing them, hoping to restore his original body. Henshaw is seemingly killed when the Lanterns separate his life force from his body. His subsequent attempt to possess Alpha Lantern Boodikka fails after she overpowers him. When Boodikka is attacked by Doomsday while investigating the remains of New Krypton, Henshaw is revealed to still be alive inside Boodikka, forming a new body out of her internal circuitry to fight Doomsday. Doomsday absorbs the nanotechnology from Henshaw's body and heals himself, becoming a new being dubbed "Cyborg Doomsday".

In 2011, "The New 52" rebooted the DC universe. Henshaw is a human doctor working for the Advanced Prosthetic Research Centre and a colleague of Caitlin Fairchild, with his role as Cyborg Superman being taken by Zor-El.

In 2016, DC Comics implemented a relaunch called "DC Rebirth", which restored its continuity to a form much as it was prior to "The New 52". Henshaw's role and prior history as Cyborg Superman is restored aside from the fact that his wife Terri committed suicide following the conflict with Superman, with the other crew members using an MRI booth to commit suicide as well.

== Powers and abilities ==
The Hank Henshaw version of Cyborg Superman is a "technomorph". Unlike a simple technopath, who can physically manipulate technology with their mind, Henshaw can extend his consciousness into any machine, including power rings and the batteries that fuel them. While occupying a cybernetic body composed of Superman's genetic material, he gains similar powers while editing out his weaknesses.

== Other characters named Cyborg Superman ==
=== Zor-El ===
The second incarnation of Cyborg Superman is Zor-El, the younger brother of Jor-El, husband of Alura, father of Supergirl, and paternal uncle of Superman. Originally, he escaped from Krypton's destruction along with the other inhabitants of Argo City. In The New 52 reboot, Supergirl discovers an amnesiac Cyborg Superman living on the planet I'noxia. This turns out to be Zor-El, who was rescued from Krypton's destruction by Brainiac and reconfigured as a cyborg to serve as his scout.

== Other versions ==
- Hank Henshaw appears in JLA: Act of God.
- Hank Henshaw appears in the DC/Marvel crossover Green Lantern/Silver Surfer: Unholy Alliances. In this story, he is brought to the Marvel Comics universe by Thanos, who sought to test a multiversal rift created during Oa's destruction. After destroying a planet due to the tidal stresses generated when he tried to convert it into a new Warworld, Henshaw battles the Silver Surfer until they are interrupted by Hal Jordan / Parallax, who seeks revenge on the former for destroying Coast City. Henshaw also appears in the crossover Superman/Fantastic Four: The Infinite Destruction, where he is transformed into an inanimate metal rod by Galactus after attempting to become his herald.
- In the crossover story Superman vs. The Terminator: Death to the Future, Henshaw learns of the existence of Skynet and uses a salvaged Terminator skull to provide Skynet with information on Superman's weaknesses. Henshaw fuses with the T-X to battle Superman, but is forced to withdraw when Supergirl infects him with a computer virus that irreparably damages the T-X.

== In other media ==
=== Television ===
- A character resembling Cyborg Superman appears in the Legion of Super Heroes episode "Message in a Bottle", voiced by Yuri Lowenthal. This version is the robot caretaker of the Fortress of Solitude in the 31st century.
- Hank Henshaw / Cyborg Superman appears in Supergirl, portrayed by David Harewood. This version is the founder of the Department of Extranormal Operations who was seemingly killed during an attempt to kill J'onn J'onzz, who subsequently impersonated him. In the second season, Henshaw resurfaces as the self-proclaimed "Cyborg Superman", having received metallic armor from Project Cadmus, and works for Cadmus' leader Lillian Luthor until she is arrested in the third season and he is defeated by Alex Danvers.
- Hank Henshaw / Cyborg Superman appears in My Adventures with Superman, voiced by Max Mittelman. This version is a S.T.A.R. Labs employee and college classmate of Lois Lane. He is later recruited by Amanda Waller to join the Human Defense Corps. During Brainiac's invasion, Henshaw is shot down by Brainiac. In the third season, Henshaw is revealed to have survived and is rescued and rebuilt by Lex Luthor and Slade Wilson to serve as a counterpart to Superman. Henshaw is finally defeated by Superman when he destroys his core.
  - In a dystopian future, Henshaw rebelled against Luthor and broke free from his control, commandeering an army of Kryptonian drones to invade Metropolis and the world. In the process, he kills Superman, Lois Lane, Supergirl, Jimmy Olsen, and others who resisted. Jon Kent, the son of Superman and Lois, is the sole survivor who travels to the past to stop Henshaw and change the future.

=== Film ===
- Elements of Hank Henshaw are incorporated in a Superman clone who appears in Superman: Doomsday.
- Hank Henshaw appears in the DC Animated Movie Universe (DCAMU) film The Death of Superman, voiced by Patrick Fabian. This version's shuttle was destroyed by Doomsday, after which Henshaw refused to evacuate under the belief that Superman would save him and his crew, leading to their deaths.
- Hank Henshaw / Cyborg Superman appears in the DCAMU film Reign of the Supermen, voiced by Patrick Fabian in his normal voice while Jerry O'Connell voiced his voice modulator. Prior to the film, Darkseid transferred his consciousness into a cyborg body and brainwashed Henshaw into serving him, indoctrinating him to resent Superman's failure to save the shuttle. Henshaw tricks the residents of Metropolis into letting him create a group of cyborgs loyal to him so he can create a Boom Tube and allow Darkseid's forces to invade Earth. Steel, Superboy, and the Eradicator join forces to revive Superman, who battles Henshaw and eventually kills him.

=== Video games ===
- Hank Henshaw / Cyborg Superman appears as a playable character in and the final boss of The Death and Return of Superman.
- Hank Henshaw / Cyborg Superman appears as a boss in Superman: The Man of Steel, voiced by Jeff Kramer.
- Hank Henshaw / Cyborg Superman appears as a downloadable alternate skin for Superman in Injustice: Gods Among Us, voiced by George Newbern.
- Hank Henshaw / Cyborg Superman appears in DC Universe Online via the "War of the Light" DLC.
- Hank Henshaw / Cyborg Superman appears as a playable character in Lego Batman 3: Beyond Gotham, voiced by Travis Willingham.

=== Miscellaneous ===
Hank Henshaw / Cyborg Superman appears in Batman: The Brave and the Bold #19.

== See also ==
- List of Green Lantern enemies
- List of Superman enemies
