= List of DC Comics characters: E =

== Earthworm ==
Earthworm (Herbert Hynde) is a criminal who ran a baby-selling ring while operating as Earthworm until it attracted the attention of Huntress. Though the ring is shut down, Earthworm escapes into the sewers.

During the "Underworld Unleashed" storyline, Earthworm sells his soul to Neron, gaining a worm-like body that allows him to dig rapidly and control vermin.

== Echo ==
Echo is the name of three characters appearing in American comic books published by DC Comics.

=== Giant robot ===
A giant robot (created by Jack Lehti) was built as a mad scientist's tool for vengeance before being stopped by the Crimson Avenger.

=== Terri Eckhart ===
Terri Eckhart was created by Keith Giffen and J.M. DeMatteis, and first appeared in Justice League Quarterly #1 (January 1991). She is a metahuman who went by the superhero alias Echo as part of the Conglomerate, a corporate-sponsored superhero team.

=== Isabelle Cheranova ===
Isabelle Cheranova was created by Greg Rucka, and first appeared in Batman: Legends of the Dark Knight #119 (July 1999). She is a cybernetically enhanced infiltrator and an enemy of Batman.

=== Echo in other media ===
An original incarnation of Echo appears in The Flash, as the Earth-19 counterpart of Cisco Ramon.

== John Economos ==
John Economos is a character from DC Comics created by John Ostrander and Luke McDonnell, debuting in Suicide Squad #1 (1987).

Economos is the warden of Belle Reve Penitentiary, and from his position, he works aiding Amanda Waller in the formation of the Suicide Squad.

=== John Economos in other media ===
John Economos appears in media set in the DC Extended Universe and the DC Universe, portrayed by Steve Agee. This version is an agent of A.R.G.U.S., aide to Amanda Waller, and founding member of Checkmate.

== Vincent Edge ==
Vincent Edge is the father of Morgan Edge. After Morgan suffers a heart attack and is hospitalized, Vincent takes over Galaxy Communicates in his absence.

In the storyline "Reign of the Supermen", Vincent Edge develops a scheme to maintain the exclusive rights to Superboy. He orders Tana Moon to stay close to Superboy and keep him posted about his activities. In addition, Edge wants Superboy to sign an exclusive contract with Galaxy Communications. As Tana is uncomfortable with the contract, Edge states that Superboy gets ratings from Galaxy Communications and that she can be replaced.

Vincent Edge plans to assemble a new incarnation of Intergang, but is attacked by Moxie Mannheim. Edge is killed by Mannheim's minion Noose.

=== Vincent Edge in other media ===
Vincent Edge appears in the Harley Quinn episode "Back to School", voiced by James Adomian.

== Eel ==
Eel is the name of several characters in DC Comics.

=== Gangster version ===
Eel is a gangster who fought Blue Beetle.

=== Star-Spangled Kid villain ===
Eel is a slippery master criminal who fought Star-Spangled Kid and Stripsey.

=== Blackhawks villain ===
Eel is a criminal who is a member of the League of Anti-Blackhawks alongside Owl, Buzzard, and Chameleon and an enemy of the Blackhawks.

=== Mortimer Coolidge ===
Mortimer Coolidge is a criminal who wears a special suit that grants him aquakinetic abilities, density control, and telekinesis. He is an enemy of Aquaman and Aquagirl. In the storyline "Infinite Crisis", Eel joins Alexander Luthor Jr.'s Secret Society of Super Villains.

=== Eel in other media ===
The Mortimer Coolidge incarnation of Eel appears in Justice League: The Flashpoint Paradox.

== El Muerto ==
El Muerto is a superhero in the DC Universe created by Oscar Pinto, Francisco Haghenbeck and Carlo Barberi. His first appearance was in Superman (vol. 2) Annual #12. A native of Mexico City who idolized Superman, Pablo Valdez died saving a girl from a hostage situation in a crumbling building but is resurrected, becoming an undead hero and adopting the persona. He began resenting Superman and blamed him for not being present to help him nor combat street crime. He teams up with fellow heroes Acrata and Iman to defend Mexico City against the sorcerer Duran. Eventually, El Muerto met Superman when a girl used her occult energies to destroy half of downtown Mexico City. Superman arrived to give the three superheroes aid, but his vulnerability to magic meant that all four heroes had to unite to stop the supernatural menace. El Muerto has since reconciled with his former hero and continues to patrol the streets of Mexico City.

== Elephant Man ==
Elephant Man is an unnamed elephant-like criminal who joined the Brotherhood of Evil alongside Goldilocks.

== Ember ==
Ember is a character appearing in American comic books published by DC Comics. Created by writer Paul Dini and artist Stéphane Roux, she first appeared in Zatanna (vol. 2) #1 (July 2010). The character is an unborn dragon gestating in the body of an unnamed human, and a servant of Brother Night.

=== Ember in other media ===
- Ember appears in Justice League Action, voiced by Tara Strong.
- Ember appears in the DC Super Hero Girls episode "#TheFreshPrincessOfRenFaire", voiced by Bennett Abara. This version is a centuries-old dragon who can assume a humanoid form. Mistaking Zatanna for a princess, she kidnaps and attempts to kill her before being killed by Wonder Woman.

== Grant Emerson ==
Grant Emerson is the first character known as Damage. He had just moved with his parents to a new home in suburban Atlanta. His parents moved often due to their work for the Symbolix Corporation, and Grant usually felt like an outsider among other kids. At his new school, Grant suddenly discovers he is a metahuman with incredible strength and the ability to produce explosive blasts when he accidentally levels his entire school. A superhero/supervillain battle involving Baron Blitzkrieg, Iron Munro, and others results in extensive damage to downtown Atlanta. Damage is arrested for his part in the event. However, Sarge Steel is able to cut a deal for him: he would be banned from Georgia for life and remanded into the custody of the Titans, led by Roy Harper.

After leaving the Titans to uncover his origins, Damage learns that he gained his powers as part of an experiment at Symbolix called Project: Telemachus, where he was imbued with the DNA of various superheroes by Vandal Savage. Around the same time, he learns that he is the son of Al Pratt, the original Atom. Roy Harper erases Grant's criminal records, making him no longer a fugitive and allowing him to join the team.

In the storyline "Blackest Night", the JSA are attacked by their fallen members, who have been resurrected as Black Lanterns. Damage is saved from Black Lantern Al Pratt by Atom (Ray Palmer), but is killed by Jean Loring.

Damage is resurrected during the Doomsday Clock storyline, where he appears with the Justice Society of America after they are restored to the timeline.

== Emperor Blackgate ==
Emperor Blackgate (Ignatius Ogilvy) is the son of a crook named Ed Ogilvy, who was killed alongside his wife during a negotiation. Ogilvy went on to become a henchman of the Penguin and gained a deep three-lined scar on his right arm after Batman attacked him with a Batarang.

When the Penguin is awaiting trial, Ogilvy takes over his operations and assumes the name Emperor Penguin. He frees Poison Ivy from her underground prison, where Penguin had placed her.

Oglivy uses a serum derived from the Man-Bat serum, Bane's Venom drug, and one of Poison Ivy's botanical concoctions, which transforms him into a blue wood-skinned creature with superhuman strength, durability, and speed. Batman and Penguin work together to take down Emperor Penguin, with Penguin using a firebomb umbrella to defeat him. After being imprisoned in Blackgate Penitentiary, Emperor Penguin kills the "prison boss" and takes control of his operations while rebranding himself as Emperor Blackgate.

== Enforcer ==
Enforcer is the name of several characters in DC Comics.

=== Daniel Kingdom ===
Daniel Kingdom is an operative of the Council.

=== Leroy Merkyn ===
Leroy Merkyn is a mercenary who worked for the 2000 Committee and fought Firestorm. Henry Hewitt, Merkyn's superior, kills him after becoming Tokamak.

=== Mica Love ===
Mica Love is a mercenary who worked for the 2000 Committee. She took on the mantle of Enforcer when fighting Firestorm. During the "War of the Gods" event, Love joins the Suicide Squad in attacking Circe's fortress, during which she is killed by Artemis.

=== Joe Gardner ===
Joe Gardner is a clone of Guy Gardner created by the Draal.

== Eradicator ==
Eradicator is the name of several characters in DC Comics.

=== First Kryptonian Eradicator ===
The Eradicator is an artificial intelligence created by an unidentified alien species in the distant past to preserve their culture. After being corrupted by the militant Kem-L, the Eradicator aims to preserve Kryptonian culture by eradicating all others. The Eradicator comes into the possession of the alien Cleric, who eventually gives it to Superman. With Superman's body as a template, the Eradicator creates a humanoid form based on him.

Following the death of Superman, the Eradicator is one of four beings who aim to replace him. After Superman is resurrected, the Eradicator sacrifices itself to restore him to full strength. The Eradicator's body merges with David Connor, who goes on to join the Outsiders.

=== Second Eradicator ===
In the storyline "Reign of Doomsday", a new Eradicator surfaces in Markovia claiming to be an ambassador from New Krypton. Although he is not the original Eradicator, he has all the original's memories. While Eradicator helps Geo-Force in Markovia, Doomsday appears and attacks him. Eradicator is quickly defeated and abducted. Later, after realizing Steel, Superboy, and Supergirl had also been abducted, they all work together to try to escape. Superman shows up to help, but in the end Eradicator is killed by a new, more-evolved Doomsday. After realizing that the new Doomsday was one of a series of clones created by Lex Luthor to keep Superman distracted, the Eradicator transfers his consciousness into the comatose body of the original Doomsday. Using the original Doomsday as his host, the Eradicator helps the other heroes contain the Doomsday clones, eventually sacrificing himself to destroy the other clones by trapping them in a pocket dimension.

=== DC Rebirth ===
Another Eradicator made its debut in the 2016 relaunch initiative DC Rebirth. After Superman and his son, Jon Kent, defeat an aquatic creature forced to terrorize a crew aboard an icebreaker, the Eradicator (in its spherical form) absorbs blood left over from Jon, detecting that he is human and Kryptonian and originates from the House of El. It flies to the Fortress of Solitude and is allowed to enter due to it containing Jon's genome. It begins to assimilate more Kryptonian genome, taking on an appearance resembling Superman. The Eradicator is later recruited by General Zod to seek out and arrest Kryptonian lawbreakers.

=== Eradicator in other media ===
- The first Kryptonian Eradicator appears in Superman & Lois. This version was created by Lara Lor-Van to preserve Kryptonians' minds following Krypton's destruction.
- An original version of the Eradicator appears in My Adventures with Superman, voiced by Steve Blum. This version is a self-adapting organic creature created by Lex Luthor.
- The first Kryptonian Eradicator appears in the DC Animated Movie Universe films The Death of Superman and Reign of the Supermen, voiced by Charles Halford. This version is a guardian program that was part of the rocket ship that carried Kal-El to Earth.
- The first Kryptonian Eradicator appears as a playable character in The Death and Return of Superman.
- The DC Rebirth incarnation of the Eradicator appears as a playable character in Lego DC Super-Villains.
- The Eradicator appears in Superman: Doomsday & Beyond, voiced by Stuart Milligan.

== Eraser ==
Eraser (Leonard "Lenny" Fiasco) was a low-grade student during his high school years and a classmate of Bruce Wayne. After dropping out of school, Fiasco becomes a criminal known as Eraser. As Eraser, Fiasco is hired by thugs to eliminate evidence from crime scenes.

=== Eraser in other media ===
Eraser makes a non-speaking appearance in The Lego Batman Movie as one of several villains recruited by the Joker to take part in his attack on Gotham City.

== Saul Erdel ==
- First appearance: Detective Comics #225 (November 1955)
- Created by: Joseph Samachson (writer); Joe Certa (artist)

Dr. Saul Erdel was a brilliant scientist who created a transmitter to communicate with other worlds, unintentionally transporting the Martian Manhunter to Earth. The shock of seeing J'onn causes Erdel to have a heart attack and die in his arms.

=== Saul Erdel in other media ===
- Saul Erdel appears in Justice League: The New Frontier. This version operated in an observatory in Gotham, and before dying, expressed regret at stranding J'onn on Earth and advised him to not reveal himself and take the time to study humanity, to avoid persecution.
- Saul Erdel makes a non-speaking cameo in a flashback in Justice League: Crisis on Two Earths.

== Shvaughn Erin ==
Shvaughn Erin

Publication information
- Publisher: DC Comics
- First appearance: Superboy and the Legion of Super-Heroes #241 (July 1978)
- Created by: Paul Levitz; Jim Sherman

In-story information
- Species: Human
- Place of origin: Earth (31st century)
- Team affiliations: Science Police
- Notable aliases: Sean Erin

Shvaughn Erin is a fictional character in the 30th and 31st centuries of the DC Comics Universe, appearing primarily as a supporting character in the various Legion of Super-Heroes series. A native of Earth, she is a member of the Science Police, the law enforcement arm of the United Planets. In a 1992 story, Erin was one of the first characters in superhero comics to be identified as transgender.

Erin was introduced during the "Earthwar" story arc in Superboy and the Legion of Super-Heroes #241 (July 1978) as the liaison between the Legion and the Science Police. She meets the Legionnaire Element Lad (Jan Arrah) in Legion of Super-Heroes (vol. 2) Annual #1 (1980), and they eventually have a romantic relationship.

Years later, Erin has ended her relationship with Element Lad, and Earth is at war with the alien Dominators. In Legion of Super-Heroes (vol. 4) #31 (July 1992), it is revealed that Erin was born a biological male named Sean Erin, and used the medication ProFem to biologically transform into a female. With open warfare across the planet, Erin is unable to maintain constant access to ProFem. Element Lad is supportive when Erin physically reverts to his original gender. Jan is unfazed, and heavily implies that he would have preferred Erin to have been a man all along. After the Dominators are defeated, Erin is appointed chief of the Science Police contingent on New Earth. The Legion's continuity was rebooted after the 1994 Zero Hour crossover series; in this new continuity, Erin is not explicitly transgender.

== Sarah Essen ==
Sarah Essen

Publication information
- Publisher: DC Comics
- First appearance: Batman #405 (March 1987)
- Created by: Frank Miller; David Mazzucchelli

In-story information
- Full name: Sarah Essen
- Team affiliations: Gotham City Police Department

Sarah Essen is a detective partnered with lieutenant James Gordon. Essen suspects Batman is Bruce Wayne by virtue of his history and the money needed for Batman's arsenal. She and Gordon, who has a pregnant wife, carry on an affair for two months, but despite their lack of discretion, a corrupt Commissioner Gillian B. Loeb is the only one to find out. Gordon ends the affair and confesses his actions to his wife Barbara. Essen starts to ask him "If your wife weren't pregnant, would you --", implying she was willing to marry him. She leaves Gotham City for New York City sometime afterwards.

Essen returns in Batman #458 (1991), where it is explained that she married a New York cop who was killed during a drug bust. Gordon had long since divorced and the two begin a relationship, resulting in Gordon's proposing to her on a night when the police station is under attack by a trio of supervillains with electrical powers. The two are married in Batman: Legends of the Dark Knight Annual #2 (1992).

When James Gordon is demoted by Mayor Armand Krol, Essen is given the job in his stead. Gordon resigns from the Gotham City Police Department in the same issue. She takes on Gordon's collaboration with Batman and Robin, but does not like the job. Essen is later fired from the GCPD by Krol, who is "a lame duck" after losing the mayoral election against Marion Grange. Essen is replaced as Commissioner by Andrew Howe, a close friend of Krol. Grange later re-instates James Gordon as Commissioner and hires Essen to serve as liaison between the GCPD and the mayor's office. Essen is murdered by the Joker at the end of the "No Man's Land" story arc.

=== Sarah Essen in other media ===
- Sarah Essen appears in Gotham, portrayed by Zabryna Guevara. This version is the captain of the GCPD Homicide Squad and the boss of James Gordon and Harvey Bullock.
- Sarah Essen appears in Batman: Year One, voiced by Katee Sackhoff.
- Sarah Essen appears in Batman: The Dark Knight Returns, voiced by Grey DeLisle.
- Sarah Essen appears as a character summon in Scribblenauts Unmasked: A DC Comics Adventure.

== Ron Evers ==
Ron Evers

Publication information
- Publisher: DC Comics
- First appearance: Tales of the New Teen Titans #1 (June 1982)
- Created by: George Pérez; Marv Wolfman

In-story information
- Full name: Ronald Evers
- Team affiliations: First Church of Anti-Technocracy

Ron Evers is a character in DC Comics.

First appearing in Tales of the New Teen Titans #1, Ron Evers is a childhood friend of Victor Stone and grew up in the slums of New York City. As Evers grew older, his upbringing steered him towards a life of crime. Evers comes into conflict with Stone, who had since become Cyborg, and is presumed dead in their ensuing battle.

Evers is recovered by S.T.A.R. Labs, converted into a cyborg, and used as a weapon for the US military. This path of destruction brings him into conflict with two teams of Titans and a second battle with Victor Stone. By the end of this conflict, Stone forcibly removes Evers's cybernetic implants, rendering him powerless.

Following this event, Evers becomes a minister in a radical Harlem-based religious organization known as the First Church of Anti-Technocracy. Denouncing all forms of technological advancement, Evers petitions his followers to excise all modern technology from their life.

=== Ron Evers in other media ===
- Ron Evers appears in Young Justice, voiced by Khary Payton. This version is a classmate of Victor Stone and a football player for the Henry Heywood High Steelworkers.
- A female character based on Ron Evers named Roni Evers appears in Doom Patrol, portrayed by Karen Obilom.

== Executioner ==
Executioner is the name of several characters in DC Comics.

=== Willy Hooker ===
Willy Hooker is a man who breaks criminals out so that he can execute them. His activities have attracted the attention of Batman and Robin who managed to defeat him.

=== Superman villain ===
The second Executioner is an unnamed man who was hired by "King" Kobra to take out Clark Kent. He alongside "King" Kobra's gang were defeated by Superman.

=== Executioner in other media ===
- An original incarnation of Executioner appears in Gotham, portrayed by Michael Chiklis. This version is Nathaniel Barnes, a Gotham City Police Department captain who was infected with the Alice Tetch virus and became a vigilante. Barnes spends time in Arkham Asylum before the Court of Owls free him and have him assume the alias of Executioner, utilizing a special outfit and axe-tipped glove.
- An original incarnation of Executioner appears in the Batwoman episode "I'll Be Judge, I'll Be Jury", portrayed by Jim Pirri. This version is Bertrand Eldon, a former executioner at Blackgate Penitentiary.
