= The Adventures of Superman (comic book) =

Comic book series

- Cover of The Adventures of Superman #424 (January 1987), by Jerry Ordway, the "first" issue of the series under that title

Publication information
- Publisher: DC Comics
- Schedule: Monthly
- Format: Ongoing series
- Genre: Superhero
- Publication date: January 1987 – April 2006
- No. of issues: 228 (#424–649, plus issues numbered #0 and #1,000,000) and 12 Annuals
- Main character: Superman

Creative team
- Written by: List: Marv Wolfman John Byrne Jerry Ordway Dan Jurgens George Pérez Roger Stern Louise Simonson Karl Kesel Greg Rucka Joe Casey Joe Kelly
- Artist: List: Jerry Ordway Dan Jurgens Tom Grummett Stuart Immonen

The Adventures of Superman is an ongoing comic book series featuring the DC Comics superhero Superman. It is a continuation from original comic book series, which was renamed after issue #423. It ran from issues #424 (January 1987) to issue #649 (April 2006), for a total of 228 monthly issues including issue #0 (October 1994) published between issues #516 and #517 as a tie-in to the Zero Hour limited series and issue #1,000,000 (November 1998) as a tie-in to the DC One Million limited series and nine Annuals published between 1987 and 1997.

== Publication history ==
=== Volume 1 ===
When the series was relaunched in late 1986 under its new title, the creative team initially was writer Marv Wolfman and artist Jerry Ordway. John Byrne replaced Wolfman with issue #436 (January 1988) and Ordway became both writer and artist with issue #445 (October 1988). Writer/artist Dan Jurgens worked on the title from 1989–1991. Hank Henshaw, a character who would later become the Cyborg Superman, first appeared in issue #466 (May 1990). By the late 1980s, the plots of the Superman books were often linked. To coordinate the storyline and sequence of event, from January 1991 to January 2002, "triangle numbers" (or "shield numbers") appeared on the cover of each Superman comic book. During these years, the Superman storylines ran with the story continuing through the titles Superman, Action Comics and later in two further series, Superman: The Man of Steel and Superman: The Man of Tomorrow.

Jerry Ordway returned as writer of the title with issue #480 (July 1991). Tom Grummett drew part of #480 and became the main artist on the series with the following issue. The series participated in the crossover storyline "Panic in the Sky" in 1992. During their run on The Adventures of Superman, Grummett and Ordway (along with editor Mike Carlin and others) were the architects of "The Death of Superman" storyline, in which Superman died and was resurrected. It was during that storyline, that Grummett and writer Karl Kesel, created Superboy (Kon-El) in The Adventures of Superman #500 (June 1993). The issue went on to become the best-selling comic of 1993, while the month it was released (April) saw the highest monthly sales in comic-book history. it was Other crossovers the series participated in included Zero Hour: Crisis in Time!, The Final Night, and Infinite Crisis.

As of the start of 2002, the integration between the Superman titles became less frequent, and the remaining issues of The Adventures of Superman commonly carried self-contained stories. Issue #600 (March 2002) was a double-sized special featuring Superman combating Lex Luthor. The final issue (#649) was part of a three-part crossover with Superman and Action Comics, an homage to the Earth-2 Superman in the wake of Infinite Crisis.

For its last two years, The Adventures of Superman was written by Greg Rucka. His stories included the villain Ruin, the attempted assassination of Lois Lane and a number of Mister Mxyzptlk appearances.

=== Volume 2 ===
Adventures of Superman was relaunched on April 29, 2013. Unlike the previous volume, the new series is not set in the mainstream DC Universe continuity but instead features anthology style stories with rotating creative teams in the same format as the second Legends of the Dark Knight series. It is released as a digital-first comic with print publication to follow. The first story was to have been written by Orson Scott Card and drawn by Chris Sprouse and Karl Story. Card's participation in the project became an issue. DC Comics responded to a petition about to be dropped with a statement that it supported freedom of expression and that the personal views of individuals associated with the company were not the views of the company. Sprouse left the project due to the media attention and some comic book stores announced a boycott. Card's Superman story was dropped and was replaced by a story written by Jeff Parker. The relaunched Adventures of Superman series came to an end with issue #17, released in September 2014.

== Annuals ==
When the original Superman series was retitled as The Adventures of Superman, both it and Superman (vol. 2) received Annuals relaunched with #1 issues. The Adventures of Superman Annual ran for nine issues from 1987 to 1997. After The Adventures of Superman was restored to its original title as Superman, its Annuals continued the (vol. 2) Annuals.

== Collected editions ==
- Superman: The Man of Steel
  - Vol. 2 includes The Adventures of Superman #424–426, 224 pages, November 2003, ISBN 978-1-4012-0005-3
  - Vol. 3 includes The Adventures of Superman #427–429, 208 pages, October 2004, ISBN 978-1-4012-0246-0
  - Vol. 4 includes The Adventures of Superman #430–431, 192 pages, September 2005, ISBN 978-1-4012-0455-6
  - Vol. 5 includes The Adventures of Superman #432–435, 208 pages, November 2006, ISBN 978-1-4012-0948-3
  - Vol. 6 includes The Adventures of Superman Annual #1, 208 pages, March 2008, ISBN 978-1-4012-1679-5
  - Vol. 7 includes The Adventures of Superman #436–438, 192 pages, February 2013, ISBN 978-1-4012-3820-9
  - Vol. 8 includes The Adventures of Superman #439–440, 240 pages, January 2014, ISBN 978-1-4012-4391-3
  - Vol. 9 includes The Adventures of Superman #441–444, 280 pages, November 2016, ISBN 978-1-4012-6637-0
- Lois & Clark: The New Adventures of Superman includes The Adventures of Superman #445, 462 and 466, 190 pages, July 1994, ISBN 978-1-56389-128-1
- Superman: Exile includes The Adventures of Superman #451–456, 304 pages, June 1998, ISBN 978-1-56389-438-1
- Superman: Eradication! (The Origin of the Eradicator) includes The Adventures of Superman #460, 464–465, 160 pages, November 1995, ISBN 978-1-56389-193-9
- Superman: Krisis of the Krimson Kryptonite includes The Adventures of Superman #472–473, 176 pages, September 1996, ISBN 978-1-56389-275-2
- Superman: Time and Time Again includes The Adventures of Superman #476–478, 206 pages, October 1994, ISBN 978-1-56389-129-8
- Superman: Panic in the Sky includes The Adventures of Superman #488–489, 188 pages, March 1993, ISBN 1-56389-094-1
- The Death of Superman includes The Adventures of Superman #496–497, 172 pages, January 1993, ISBN 1-56389-097-6
- World Without a Superman includes The Adventures of Superman #498–500, 240 pages, April 1993, ISBN 1-56389-118-2
- The Return of Superman includes The Adventures of Superman #500–505, 480 pages, September 1993, ISBN 1-56389-149-2
- The Death and Return of Superman Omnibus includes The Adventures of Superman #496–505, 784 pages, September 2007, ISBN 1-4012-1550-5
- Superman: The Death of Clark Kent includes The Adventures of Superman #523–525, 320 pages, May 1997, ISBN 1-56389-323-1
- Superman: The Trial of Superman includes The Adventures of Superman #529–531, 272 pages, November 1997, ISBN 1-56389-331-2
- Superman: The Wedding and Beyond includes The Adventures of Superman #541, 192 pages, January 1998, ISBN 1-56389-392-4
- Superman: Transformed! includes The Adventures of Superman #542 and 545, 197 pages, April 1998, ISBN 1-56389-406-8
- Superman vs. the Revenge Squad includes The Adventures of Superman #539, 542–543, 144 pages, February 1999, ISBN 1-56389-487-4
- Superman: No Limits! includes The Adventures of Superman #574, 212 pages, November 2000, ISBN 1-56389-699-0
- Superman: Endgame includes The Adventures of Superman #576, 180 pages, January 2001, ISBN 1-56389-701-6
- Superman: 'Til Death Do Us Part includes The Adventures of Superman #577–578, 228 pages, December 2001, ISBN 1-56389-862-4
- Superman: Critical Condition includes The Adventures of Superman #579–580, 196 pages, February 2003, ISBN 1-56389-949-3
- Superman: Emperor Joker includes The Adventures of Superman #582–583, 256 pages, January 2007, ISBN 1-4012-1193-3
- Superman: President Lex includes The Adventures of Superman #581, 244 pages, June 2003, ISBN 1-56389-974-4
- Superman: Our Worlds at War
  - Vol. 1 includes The Adventures of Superman #593–594, 264 pages, September 2002, ISBN 1-56389-915-9
  - Vol. 2 includes The Adventures of Superman #595, 264 pages, September 2002, ISBN 1-56389-916-7
- Superman: Our Worlds at War Complete Edition includes The Adventures of Superman #593–595, 512 pages, June 2006, ISBN 1-4012-1129-1
- Superman: Return to Krypton includes The Adventures of Superman #589, 606, 212 pages, February 2004, ISBN 1-4012-0194-6
- Superman: Ending Battle includes The Adventures of Superman #608–609, 192 pages, May 2009, ISBN 1-4012-0194-6
- Superman: Godfall includes The Adventures of Superman #625–626, 112 pages, September 2004, ISBN 978-1-4012-0376-4
- Superman: Unconventional Warfare includes The Adventures of Superman #627–632 and backup stories from #625–626, 160 pages, February 2005, ISBN 978-1-4012-0449-5
- Superman: That Healing Touch includes The Adventures of Superman #633–638, 168 pages, August 2005, ISBN 978-1-4012-0453-2
- Day of Vengeance includes The Adventures of Superman #639, 224 pages, December 2005, ISBN 978-1-4012-0840-0
- Superman: Ruin Revealed includes The Adventures of Superman #640–641, 644–647, 139 pages, ISBN 978-1-4352-3521-2
- Superman: Sacrifice includes The Adventures of Superman #642–643, 192 pages, January 2006, ISBN 978-1-4012-0919-3
- Superman: Infinite Crisis includes The Adventures of Superman #648–649, 128 pages, July 2006, ISBN 978-1-4012-0953-7
