= My Adventures with Superman =

American animated television series

- Intro logo
- Genre: Action-adventure; Romantic comedy; Science fiction; Superhero
- Based on: Characters from DC
- Developed by: Jake Wyatt; Brendan Clogher; Josie Campbell
- Showrunners: Jake Wyatt; Brendan Clogher; Josie Campbell
- Voices of: Jack Quaid; Alice Lee; Ishmel Sahid; Kiana Madeira
- Music by: Daniel Futcher; Dominic Lewis (S1–2)
- Opening theme: "Up and Away" by Kyle Troop and the Heretics
- Country of origin: United States
- Original language: English
- No. of seasons: 3
- No. of episodes: 30

Production
- Executive producers: Sam Register; Brendan Clogher; Jake Wyatt; James Gunn (S3); Peter Safran (S3)
- Producer: Kimberly S. Moreau
- Editors: John Soares; Ginger Brown
- Running time: 22 minutes
- Production companies: Warner Bros. Animation; DC Entertainment (S1–2); DC Studios (S3)

Original release
- Network: Adult Swim
- Release: July 7, 2023 – present

My Adventures with Superman is an American animated superhero drama television series developed by Jake Wyatt, Brendan Clogher, and Josie Campbell and based on the DC Comics character Superman. The series airs on Cartoon Network's nighttime programming block Adult Swim, and follows Clark Kent and Lois Lane as they both develop romantic feelings for each other and the former builds his identity as the superhero, Superman.

The series features the starring voices of Jack Quaid, Alice Lee, Ishmel Sahid, and Kiana Madeira. It was initially planned to air on Cartoon Network during the daytime, but was later moved to Adult Swim despite not necessarily being intended to target an adult demographic. It was produced by Warner Bros. Animation, with animation services provided by Studio Mir in South Korea for the first two seasons and Studio Grida, also in South Korea, for the third season.

The series premiered on Adult Swim on July 7, 2023, (Note: Adult Swim lists the series as premiering on July 6, 2023, at 12:00 a.m. (24:00) EDT/PDT, which is effectively July 7.) with each episode releasing on HBO Max shortly after broadcast. The second season began broadcasting on May 26, 2024, (Note: Adult Swim lists the second season as premiering on May 25, 2024, at 12:00 a.m. (24:00) EDT/PDT, which is effectively May 26.) shifting its premieres to the network's Toonami programming block, which originally encored the first season. A third season premiered on June 14, 2026. (Note: Adult Swim lists the third season as premiering on June 13, 2026, at 12:00 a.m. (24:00) EDT/PDT, which is effectively June 14.) A spin-off series titled My Adventures with Green Lantern is in development.

== Premise ==
The story follows Clark Kent, as he builds his secret identity as Superman and explores his mysterious origins, and Lois Lane, whom Clark develops a crush on and vice-versa, who is on her way to becoming a star reporter. Teaming up with photographer and Clark's best friend Jimmy Olsen, the trio break the stories that matter and save the day against many villains in the city of Metropolis, as well as encountering Clark's Kryptonian cousin, Kara.

== Cast ==
=== Main ===
- Jack Quaid as Clark Kent / Superman, a Kryptonian superhero and a journalist for the Daily Planet in Metropolis.
  - Bizarro, a clone of Superman who gets a job as an ice cream vendor.
- Alice Lee as Lois Lane, a journalist for the Daily Planet and Clark's love interest.
- Ishmel Sahid as Jimmy Olsen, a photographer for the Daily Planet and Clark and Lois's best friend.
- Kiana Madeira as Kara Zor-El / Supergirl (season 3; recurring season 2), a Kryptonian superhero and Superman's cousin.

=== Recurring and guest ===
- Darrell Brown as Perry White, the editor-in-chief of the Daily Planet and Lois, Clark, and Jimmy's boss.
  - Tyrannko, the prince of the reptilian Subterranosauri.
  - Krull, a Subterranosauri.
- Zehra Fazal as Leslie Willis / Livewire, a thief with electrokinetic powers.
- Azuri Hardy-Jones as "Flip" Johnson, a young intern at the Daily Planet and friend of Clark, Lois, and Jimmy.
- Jason Marnocha as Jor-El, Clark's biological Kryptonian father.
  - Ethan Avery / Damage, a Task Force X agent who utilizes cybernetic Kryptonian arms that allow him to grow in size.
- Reid Scott as Jonathan Kent, Clark's adoptive father.
- Kari Wahlgren as Martha Kent, Clark's adoptive mother.
- Chris Parnell as Slade Wilson / Deathstroke, an assassin and agent of Task Force X who later becomes Luthor's bodyguard.
- Lucas Grabeel as Kyle / Mist, a member of Intergang who uses Kryptonian technology to become invisible and intangible.
- Catherine Taber as Siobhan McDougal / Silver Banshee, a member of Intergang and sister of fellow member Mist who wears a Kryptonian mask that grants her a sonic scream.
- Vincent Tong as Steve Lombard, a sports columnist at the Daily Planet.
  - Rough House, a member of Intergang with Kryptonian gauntlets that grant him super strength.
  - Vulture, a minion of Doctor Poison.
- Melanie Minichino as Cat Grant, a gossip columnist at the Daily Planet.
  - Silver St. Cloud, a philanthropist millionaire.
  - Whip, a Russian thief with Kryptonite-powered whips.
  - Marina Maru / Doctor Poison, the princess of Markovia.
- Jake Green as Dr. Anthony Ivo / Parasite, the CEO of AmazoTech and creator of the Parasite armor.
- Max Mittelman as Lex Luthor, Superman's nemesis. He initially appears as Anthony Ivo's personal assistant before siding with Task Force X and establishing LexCorp as its CEO.
  - Hank Henshaw / Cyborg Superman, an astronaut who became a cybernetic human following the fight with Brainiac.
  - Joseph Martin / Atomic Skull, a Task Force X agent who uses a Kryptonian suit that allows him to manipulate radiation.
  - Thomas Weston, the CEO of AmerTek and the former boss of John Henry Irons and Silas Stone.
- Laila Berzins as Rory / Heat Wave, a gang leader who wields Kryptonian flamethrowers. After being captured by Task Force X, Heat Wave is ordered to help capture Superman alongside other criminals. She would later develop a lesbian relationship with Livewire in the second season.
- Joel de la Fuente as General Sam Lane, Lois's father and a U.S. Army general.
- Debra Wilson as Amanda Waller, a colleague of General Lane and head of Task Force X.
- Jessie Inocalla as the Brain, a scientist who originally worked for Project Cadmus and was left as a disembodied brain following an attack by Task Force X.
- André Sogliuzzo as Monsieur Mallah, an intelligent gorilla and romantic partner of Brain.
- David Errigo Jr. as Mister Mxyzptlk, a trickster from the fifth dimension.
- Andromeda Dunker as Vicki Vale, a journalist in Gotham City and a rival to Lois.
  - Fox, a minion of Doctor Poison.
- Michael Emerson as Brainiac, a super-intelligent android and Supergirl's adoptive father.
  - The Head Steward, one of the robots at the Fortress of Solitude.
- Byron Marc Newsome as Dr. John Irons / Steel, a former scientist at AmerTek who was fired by Weston for speaking out against his fusion reactor.
  - Silas Stone, Irons's colleague who was also fired by Weston for speaking out against his fusion reactor.
- Michael Yurchak as Winslow Schott / Toyman, a pawn shop owner, toy maker, robotics and demolitions expert, and an old contact of Sam.
- Rhea Seehorn as Lara, Clark's biological Kryptonian mother.
- Auli'i Cravalho as Jessica Cruz, a girl who attends Super-Fest and talks positively about Supergirl.
- Darren Criss as Jonathan Lane / Jon Kent / Superboy, Clark and Lois' son from a future timeline.
- Vella Lovell as Doris Zuel / Giganta, a size-shifting villain.
- Chandler Lovelle as Zazzala, the co-head of the dating center W.O.R.M.S.
- Erin Anderson as Ms. Gsptlsnz, Mr. Mxyzptlk's wife.
- Jolie Hoang-Rappaport as Lara Lane / Supergirl, Clark and Lois' daughter from a possible future timeline.
- Steve Blum as Eradicator, a Kryptonian clone created by Luthor using his grey matter sample and Superman's tissue sample. As a prototype for the later Eradicators in a possible future, he can adapt and evolve while also gaining the ability to make brutish duplicates.

== Episodes ==
Season	Episodes	Originally released	
Season	Episodes	First released	Last released
1	10	July 7, 2023	September 1, 2023
2	10	May 26, 2024	July 21, 2024
3	10	June 14, 2026	August 16, 2026

=== Season 1 (2023) ===
No. overall	No. in season	Title	Directed by	Written by	Original release date	Prod. code	Viewers (millions)
1	1	"Adventures of a Normal Man"	Jen Bennett	Josie Campbell, Brendan Clogher & Jake Wyatt	July 7, 2023	101	0.21
2	2	"Adventures of a Normal Man"	Diana Huh	Cynthia Furey	July 7, 2023	102	0.21
Part 1: In Smallville, Kansas, a young Clark Kent awakens the power of super-strength, super-speed, invulnerability, and flight to save a woman and her baby from a car accident. Years later, in Metropolis, Clark and his roommate Jimmy Olsen, a photography student and alien conspiracy theorist, start their first day as interns for the Daily Planet. Assigned to senior intern Lois Lane, she deceives them into helping her investigate a military-grade technology theft. With a lead from Flip Johnson's Newskid Legion, the trio finds the thieves loading military robots at the docks. The thieves' leader, Leslie Willis, unleashes a robot to attack them. Clark gets out of view and returns in disguise to destroy it. As Willis activates the remaining robots to battle Clark, Lois successfully deactivates them while he awakens his super-speed to destroy the final robot. Despite their efforts, editor-in-chief Perry White refuses to publish the story based on Jimmy's blurry photos without real proof of the new metahuman that Lois dubbed "Superman". Once the trio become friends, Lois invites the boys to help her get an exclusive interview with Superman. Part 2: While Lois doggedly follows up on the robot theft for a lead to Superman, Clark returns to Smallville to investigate his past and understand his new powers. Digging up the space pod that delivered him to Earth, Clark activates an alien hologram and sees visions of an alien planet amid a space war being destroyed. After Clark gains new alien clothing from this, his mother Martha Kent adds a belt and shorts to complete the look. Meanwhile, Willis is hunted by the organization she stole the robot technology from called Task Force X and arranges a meeting with leading agent Slade Wilson. When Willis threatens to detonate explosives across the city sewers if they continue hunting her, Lois and Jimmy's surprise interruption turns the meeting into a scramble for the detonator. Willis reveals her electrical super-suit to fight Wilson until Superman arrives to subdue her. Wilson damages her suit's power crystal, leading Superman to destroy it after it gives him another vision of the space war. Though Jimmy's clear photos convince Perry to publish the story, he gives the byline to uninvolved staff reporters. Later, Wilson tortures Willis at a black site for information about Superman.
3	3	"My Interview with Superman"	Jen Bennett	Aman Adumer	July 14, 2023	103	0.17
While Lois attempts to interview Superman, Clark struggles to figure out how to help her while protecting his secret identity. However, the interns must also contend with the Daily Planet's established "Scoop Troop" reporters, who Perry credited for their Superman story—Steve Lombard, Cat Grant, and Ronnie Troupe. Meanwhile, Mist and his friend Rough House use technology they obtained from Willis to break his sister Siobhan McDougal out of prison and equip her with sonic tech to rebuild their small-time crew Intergang. Despite Clark's misgivings, the interns impersonate the Scoop Troop to investigate Siobhan, discovering a clue to Intergang's next heist. When Intergang attempts to rob the Metropolitan City Bank, their ice cannon's power crystal malfunctions and begins to freeze everything in proximity. Seeing Lois and Jimmy in danger, Superman awakens his heat vision and destroys the crystal, granting him a vision of an invading robot army. While Wilson poses as an EMT to secretly take the defeated Intergang into custody, Superman accepts Lois's interview and discloses he is still figuring himself out, but is committed to saving people. To his dismay, Lois later tells Clark that she suspects Superman is lying.
4	4	"Let's Go to Ivo Tower, You Say"	Kiki Manrique	Josie Campbell & Brendan Clogher	July 21, 2023	104	0.18
Perry assigns the interns to cover the AmazoTech gala held by CEO, Doctor Anthony Ivo. Lois is snubbed by attendees for her invasive questions while Clark stumbles upon an argument between Ivo and his chairman Curtis regarding the board of directors voting out Ivo. Ejected by Ivo's security, Lois sneaks Clark back inside. They open up to each other before discovering a secret technology room connecting Ivo to Willis and Intergang. An angered Ivo demonstrates the Parasite 1.0 armor and attempts to kill Curtis. Clark becomes Superman to save Curtis while Ivo traps the attendees in the Amazo Panic Room to make them witness him overpowering Superman. Realizing the armor absorbs energy from his attacks, Superman stops fighting Ivo directly as Lois and Jimmy deactivate the Panic Room. With the suit depowered, Superman removes it from Ivo, who became deformed from the suit's side effects. With Ivo under EMT care, the interns return to find the secret room empty. Lois kisses Clark, considering the night a date. Later, after submitting her exposé on Ivo, Lois finds a torn tabloid article involving Kansas miracle sightings in Clark's coat. After reworking her evidence board, Lois concludes Clark is Superman.
5	5	"You Will Believe A Man Can Lie"	Diana Huh	Story by : M. Willis, Cynthia Furey & Aman Adumer; Teleplay by : M. Willis	July 28, 2023	105	0.20
Hoping to confess his burgeoning feelings for Lois, Clark asks for her help in developing a story about the stolen military technology spreading throughout Metropolis and a mysterious individual kidnapping anyone using them. However, she sees it as an opportunity to expose him as Superman. Using an old dispatch scanner, she chases down Superman as he foils various crimes before eventually meeting him after he defeats Heat Wave, another criminal empowered by the stolen technology. While Superman is distracted, Heat Wave escapes, believing he is behind the kidnappings. After he drops off Lois at the Daily Planet to keep her safe, he re-confronts Heat Wave and discovers the true culprit behind the abducted criminals is an armored Wilson aided by similar robots that Willis used. Their subsequent fight soon endangers civilians, leading to Wilson's superiors, the General and Amanda Waller, ordering him to withdraw so Superman can save them. After returning to Lois, she forces Clark to reveal his secret identity to her and is left distraught. Meanwhile, Jimmy is disappointed to learn Clark and Lois failed to attend a pre-planned camping trip to investigate Bigfoot sightings with him. He goes alone, but a large gorilla kidnaps him.
6	6	"My Adventures with Mad Science"	Kiki Manrique	Story by : Aman Adumer, Angela Entzminger & Cynthia Furey; Teleplay by : Angela Entzminger	August 4, 2023	106	0.21
After failing to locate Jimmy, Clark reaches out to Lois for help. Despite still being mad at him, she agrees. Scouring the woods, the pair find an abandoned military installation called Area 52, but upon crossing the fence, Clark's powers falter due to the area being exposed to red solar radiation before they are chased by OMAC robots. Meanwhile, inside Area 52, Jimmy meets and befriends the gorilla Monsieur Mallah and his partner the Brain. The pair reveal they originally worked for Project Cadmus, a branch of Task Force X that focused on developing futuristic technology, before the latter organization betrayed them and raided Area 52. Ever since, the Brain and Mallah have been attempting to create a wormhole to access other dimensions where they will be accepted. Eventually breaching Area 52, Clark and Lois reconcile with each other and Jimmy, who reveals he knew of Clark's secret identity, before joining Brain and Mallah in defeating the OMACs. Successfully opening their wormhole, the Brain warns Clark that Task Force X is after him before leaving with Mallah. Sometime later, the General recruits Ivo to help him use Cadmus' technology to kill Superman.
7	7	"Kiss Kiss Fall in Portal"	Jen Bennett	Story by : Paul Chang, Cynthia Furey & Aman Adumer; Teleplay by : Paul Chang	August 11, 2023	107	0.19
After Clark shows Lois and Jimmy his spaceship and clarifies his incomplete alien origin, Clark and Lois plan their first date. However, he is interrupted by Mister Mxyzptlk, a multiversal imp who deceives him into helping him steal a recorder from a museum on Earth-1, revealing Clark is from the planet Krypton in the process. Meanwhile, Lois and Jimmy are recruited by the multiversal "League of Lois Lanes" to help them stop Mxyzptlk and Clark. Suspicious of their intentions, Lois searches their files, stumbling onto the redacted "File X". Upon finding them, the League attack Clark while Mxyzptlk hijacks the League's vessel and travels to their headquarters with the recorder and Lois' help. As she steals the original File X, he retrieves his hat, regains his full strength, and causes chaos until Superman distracts him, allowing Lois to depower him and Jimmy to restrain him. While the League arrest Mxyzptlk, Jimmy's counterpart Jalana secretly brings the interns back to their native Earth-12, where Clark and Lois finish their date. Following this, she opens File X and finds recordings of evil alternate universe Supermen and a sample of a green crystal, later identified as Kryptonite, the League used to injure Superman.
8	8	"Zero Day"	Diana Huh	Cynthia Furey	August 18, 2023	108	0.18
9	9	"Zero Day"	Kiki Manrique	Aman Adumer	August 25, 2023	109	0.20
Part 1: The General uses shock collars to forcibly recruit Willis, Intergang, and Heat Wave into assisting Wilson and Ivo capture Superman. Meanwhile, after developing super-hearing and hearing everyone in Metropolis crying for help, Clark runs himself ragged helping everyone and soon becomes sleep-deprived and weakened. When Gotham Gazette journalist Vicki Vale arrives to cover his activities, Lois is starstruck to meet her. Lois becomes disappointed when Vale interviews Ivo's former assistant Alex to run a biased story defaming Superman as a menace. Superman saves an invisible Mist from being hit by a truck but inadvertently causes an accident, turning public opinion against him. Mist says Task Force X kidnapped Siobhan, and Superman offers to rescue her, only to be led into a trap and attacked by the group. Though he holds his own despite his weakened state, Superman is eventually knocked out by Willis and Ivo via his upgraded Parasite armor. The General stops Ivo from killing him as he wants to interrogate Superman. Mist regrets luring Superman into the trap as Lois and Jimmy rush to the scene, but arrive to see the group carry Superman away. Part 2: In flashbacks to "Zero Day", the General, Waller, and their forces were attacked by an alien army led by an armored Superman-like figure codenamed "Nemesis Omega" before a mysterious event forced the army into a retreat that left their technology behind. In the present, the Newskid Legion helps Lois and Jimmy search for Superman while the General interrogates him for information on Zero Day. From Superman's anguished reaction, the General doubts his connection to it while a displeased Waller secretly helps the prisoners escape. A vengeful Ivo attacks Superman, but inadvertently frees him. Flip eventually finds and takes him to safety. Clark believes he was sent to Earth to destroy it, but Lois assures him otherwise. Upon learning Ivo is siphoning the power grid and going on a rampage, Lois and Jimmy use social media to petition Metropolis' citizens to turn off their power, weakening Ivo so Superman can use his newly-awakened X-ray vision to locate and remove Ivo from his suit. As Superman and Lois declare their love, Jimmy finds File X. On Checkmate's behalf, Waller demotes the General from Task Force X's leadership and gives him Ivo's last invention the Omega Cannon with orders to kill Superman.
10	10	"Hearts of the Fathers"	Jen Bennett	Serena Wu & Jake Wyatt	September 1, 2023	110	0.20
Haunted by nightmares about Zero Day, Clark swears to halt any invasion. After Perry officially promotes Clark, Lois, and Jimmy to reporters for their article on Ivo's defeat, they have Thanksgiving dinner with Clark's parents. Lois also invites her father, General Sam Lane, who fails to recognize Clark. When Jimmy tries to talk with Lois and Clark, he drops File X, revealing the Supermen recordings to a devastated Clark and exposing him to the Kryptonite. Clark's pod also reacts, sending a signal that prompts an invasion similar to Zero Day. While Superman and Sam battle the invaders, Jimmy deduces that the crystal also hurts them. A weakened Superman takes the crystal to destroy the mothership, halting the invasion as a hologram of his biological father helps return him to Earth. Sam prepares to kill him, but Lois pleads for his life and reminds him that Superman had saved them, causing Sam to leave. At dinner, Jimmy reveals he sold his Flamebird channel to the Daily Planet, becoming a millionaire. Across the universe, Brainiac informs an armored Kryptonian warrior of the rebellious Earth as a new planet to conquer. The undeterred warrior vows humanity will kneel.

=== Season 2 (2024) ===
No. overall	No. in season	Title	Directed by	Written by	Original release date	Prod. code	Viewers (millions)
11	1	"More Things in Heaven And Earth"	Diana Huh	M. Willis	May 26, 2024	201	0.22
As Clark struggles to plan the perfect Valentine's Day date with Lois, they and Jimmy head to S.T.A.R. Labs to interview Hank Henshaw regarding a strange meteoroid that disappeared over Antarctica. While there, Jimmy convinces Alex to find a new job after being denied from S.T.A.R. Labs for his involvement with Ivo. Deducing that the meteoroid is Clark's missing spaceship, the trio head out to find it. After being separated by malfunctioning Kryptonian technology, Clark encounters another hologram of his biological father Jor-El, whose translation program has finished updating. He reveals more of his origins and that he has a cousin, Kara, who was also sent away from Krypton, before realizing Kryptonite is affecting the ship. Meanwhile, Lois and Jimmy discover Waller, Wilson, and Agent Ethan Avery are there to commandeer the tech and have taken Sam prisoner. While fixing the ship, Superman fights Avery and Wilson until Jor-El uses the spaceship's power to purify the Kryptonite and convert it into a fortress. Before shutting down, Jor-El tells Superman to find a beacon to locate Kara. Afterward, Lois asks Clark to help her rescue Sam while Task Force X absconds with the tech they acquired and Kryptonite samples.
12	2	"Adventures with My Girlfriend"	Kiki Manrique	Angela Entzminger	May 26, 2024	202	0.15
As Task Force X establishes a new base underneath Stryker's prison, Waller interrogates Sam for the location of his share of the organization's arsenal. Meanwhile, Clark and Lois agree to help a boy named Billy find his father, a volunteer librarian at Stryker's who went missing while investigating other missing persons' cases. With Jimmy busy wrangling Lombard and the Newskid Legion, the pair infiltrate the prison themselves and stumble onto Task Force X's new base. While rescuing Sam and Billy's father, they discover Waller has been kidnapping inmates unable to post bail for use as test subjects to empower her agents before they are attacked by Waller and Agent Joseph Martin. As the Lanes evacuate the inmates, Superman struggles against Martin, whose radioactive armor allows him to bypass Superman's invulnerability. Nonetheless, Superman defeats Martin, recovers the beacon Jor-El asked him to find, and rejoins the Lanes and inmates before they are rescued by Jimmy and Lombard, who saw the chaos from afar. Afterward, Sam agrees to stay with Clark and Jimmy while Alex, now referring to himself by his real name of Lex Luthor, rescues Waller from an escaped Ivo and offers to help her.
13	3	"Fullmetal Scientist"	Jen Bennett	Cynthia Furey	June 2, 2024	203	0.17
While rescuing AmerTek scientist Silas Stone from a burning building, Superman unlocks another new power, a "super aura" force-field. After Superman leaves, Willis appears and threatens Silas into remotely deleting all records of a project he was working on. The next day, Clark struggles to balance his work and social lives with his work as Superman and housing a paranoid Sam. Concurrently, Lois, Vale, and Jimmy's new intern Flip separately uncover a mystery surrounding missing scientists Silas and Dr. John Irons, AmerTek's CEO Thomas Weston, and his line of Metallo robots. As Lois and Vale compete to out-scoop each other, Superman, Jimmy, and Flip locate Irons, who reveals Weston forced him and Silas to rush production on the Metallos and create an unstable "Amer-Fusion" reactor to power AmerTek's Metropolis facility before firing them. After repelling Willis, who Weston hired to kill Irons and intimidate Silas, Superman and Irons join forces to stop Weston before he destroys Metropolis, with Irons using his "Steel" mech suit to fend off the Metallos. Afterward, Weston is arrested, Vale offers Lois a job at the Gotham Gazette, and Luthor's new company LexCorp buys out AmerTek and confiscates the Steel suit and Metallos for Task Force X's use.
14	4	"Two Lanes Diverged"	Diana Huh	Sari Cooper	June 9, 2024	204	0.18
In flashbacks, Sam trains Lois in finding the North Star, though they gradually become estranged due to his military work. In the present, Sam fears Waller has found him and leaves for a safehouse to prepare, but Lois gets involved against his wishes. While evading Task Force X's agents, who intend to kill Sam, the Lanes convene with Sam's old contact Winslow Schott, but he betrays them. All throughout, the Lanes argue over Sam's methods driving them apart. Meanwhile, Jimmy learns he has been invited to serve as a guest speaker at a S.T.A.R. Labs symposium and invites Clark. However, they learn the topic is whether aliens like Superman do more harm than good. Complicating matters, Jimmy debates unsuccessfully against Luthor regarding Superman's trustworthiness and how powerful he is compared to humanity, among other points. When Task Force X and the Lanes' battle brings them to the symposium, Superman intervenes to help the pair escape. As Task Force X retreats, Luthor uses the aftermath to turn the attendees against Superman. Later that night, Clark sends a message to Kara, Sam disappears, Luthor and Waller gain support from S.T.A.R. Labs and the Pentagon, and the Kryptonian warrior approaches Earth.
15	5	"Most Eligible Superman"	Kiki Manrique	Josie Campbell	June 16, 2024	205	N/A
Perry assigns Clark and Lois to interview Superman upon learning he was named a finalist in Metropolis' most eligible bachelor and bachelorette contest. Ignoring Perry's orders, Cat forces Lois into letting her join so she can uncover Superman's secret identity. Amidst the contest, Superman's fellow finalist Silver St. Cloud develops an interest in him while Cat dismisses Lois' affirmation that she is dating Superman, causing her to doubt her relationship with him. Meanwhile, Jimmy struggles to determine how to apologize to Clark after what happened at the symposium. Along the way, he encounters Kara, who has come to Metropolis to search for her cousin. After Jimmy offers to help her, they bond over touring Metropolis before eventually heading to the contest, where Jimmy learns Kara was searching for Superman, who is named the winner. Seeing Lois leave, he tries to reconcile with her, but she reveals her stress over Sam's disappearance, Vale's offer, and their frayed relationship. Suddenly, Kara assumes an armored form and attacks Superman, believing he is unfit to join the Kryptonian Empire. Despite Superman unlocking the power of ice breath in their ensuing fight, Kara defeats and captures him on Brainiac's orders.
16	6	"The Machine Who Would Be Empire"	Jen Bennett	M. Willis	June 23, 2024	206	N/A
Superman mounts an escape attempt until Kara claims there are other living Kryptonians. Using a thought-projector device, she explains that before Krypton fell, it was the most advanced society in the galaxy and invited less fortunate planets to share in their utopia. He attempts to explain why she cannot conquer Earth, but she questions why he limits himself around humans. After stumbling onto her secret collection of alien memorabilia, he asks her to show her a planet the Kryptonian Empire conquered. She takes him to Thanagar, but they find it in ruins, briefly causing Kara to question Brainiac's intentions before his robots bring her and Superman to his spaceship Kandor. Sending Kara away, Brainiac reveals he is a warmonger willing to kill those who refuse Kryptonian rule before detaining Superman and brainwashing Kara for disobeying him. However, Kara's memorabilia helps her remember her doubt towards Brainiac and discovers the destruction she committed while under his control. While trying to determine what to do next, she encounters a spaceship piloted by Jimmy, Lois, Mallah, and the Brain.
17	7	"Olsen's Eleven"	Diana Huh	Story by : Paul Chang, M. Willis, Angela Entzminger & Cynthia Furey; Teleplay by : Paul Chang	June 30, 2024	207	0.18
Following Superman and Kara's battle, Waller announces the formation of the Human Defense Corps (HDC) and places Metropolis under martial law in preparation for an impending alien invasion. Meanwhile, Jimmy and Lois plan to break into S.T.A.R. Labs and steal an experimental spaceship so they can find Superman. To help them, they hire Willis, who agrees over her girlfriend Heat Wave's apparent protests, and recruit Mallah and the Brain, who had returned due to trouble with their multiversal doppelgängers. Complicating matters, Jimmy discovers Lois intends to use her Kryptonite sample on Kara. Moreover, security proves tighter than expected due to Waller and Wilson overseeing Luthor while he upgrades the Metallos with Kryptonite power cores. Quickly discovering their presence, Waller sends Wilson to capture Lois and Jimmy's group. Despite the chaos of evading Task Force X, Mallah and the Brain successfully launch the spaceship while Willis and Heat Wave, who were enacting a separate scheme, fend off the Metallos to ensure the group's escape. As Waller deems Luthor's work successful and allocates more resources for him, Mallah and the Brain use a newly constructed portal device to send them, Lois, and Jimmy into deep space, where they encounter Kara.
18	8	"The Death of Clark Kent"	Kiki Manrique	Angela Entzminger	July 7, 2024	208	N/A
Brainiac uses the "Black Mercy" device to invade and manipulate Superman's memories, intending to transfer his AI to the latter's body before Kandor falls apart. Despite his best efforts, Superman fails to stop Brainiac from learning of Lois and Jimmy, using his connection to them against him, and eventually trapping his mind in a simulation of his birth family and a restored Krypton. Meanwhile, Kara and Jimmy reunite before they and Lois devise a plan to save Superman. While Mallah and the Brain stay behind to repair the spaceship, Jimmy and Lois infiltrate Kandor while Kara attempts to reason with Brainiac. Frustrated with her perceived rebelliousness, Brainiac confirms that he brainwashed her to serve his interests. Kara damages his current body, but Brainiac successfully possesses Superman's body. Jimmy tries to use the Kryptonite on Brainiac, but he ejects him, Lois, and Kara into space before teleporting Kandor away. After Mallah and the Brain rescue the trio, Lois reveals she stole the Black Mercy and uses it on herself in an attempt to save Superman.
19	9	"Pierce the Heavens, Superman!"	Jen Bennett	Jake Wyatt	July 14, 2024	209	0.16
As Kara and Jimmy return to Earth to stop Brainiac, Jimmy attempts to warn Metropolis. Though the pair are separated from Mallah and the Brain and apprehended by Task Force X, they are rescued by the Daily Planet staff and Vale. With the odds against them, Kara starts to lose hope, but Lombard and Jimmy help her choose who she wants to be like Clark did. As Brainiac launches his invasion of Earth, Kara tries to stop him, but he overpowers her and Task Force X. Meanwhile, Lois successfully enters the simulation that Clark is trapped in, but is captured by Jor-El and his wife Lara, who know she does not belong and attempt to delete her due to the Black Mercy being unable to support multiple minds at once. However the simulation resets itself to when she first arrived every time they do so. Over the course of several resets, she gradually reaches out to and reconciles with Clark before they join forces to destroy the simulation. Forced back into his previous body, Brainiac retaliates by hacking the Metallos to defeat Kara and a restored Superman for him while he attempts to use Kandor to destroy Metropolis.
20	10	"My Adventures with Supergirl"	Diana Huh	Josie Campbell, Brendan Clogher & Jake Wyatt	July 21, 2024	210	0.21
As the HDC fail to destroy Kandor and Luthor flees, Waller fails to reach Henshaw or her agents. Nonetheless, she continues fighting back and reunites with Sam, who recruited Irons, Willis, Heat Wave, and Intergang to help them and Superman. With the group's aid, Superman and Kara recover, reach Kandor, and confront Brainiac, who reveals he destroyed Krypton in the face of peace talks that would have led to his shutdown, and attempts to brainwash Kara once more. In the ensuing fight, Superman, Lois, and Jimmy help her break Brainiac's control over her. As she and Superman push Kandor away from Earth, they use the sun's energy to strengthen themselves and destroy Kandor before Kara destroys Brainiac's body and salvages his core. Afterward, Clark, Lois, and Jimmy bring Kara to Smallville to recover and meet Jonathan and Martha. Over the next week during the credits, Mallah and the Brain rebuild Cadmus with Kara and Jimmy's help, Vale dubs Kara "Supergirl", Waller becomes a fugitive after her crimes are exposed, Luthor establishes LexCorp's headquarters and hires Wilson, Lois turns down Vale's offer, and Kara joins Clark, Lois, and Jimmy in protecting Metropolis.

=== Season 3 (2026) ===
No. overall	No. in season	Title	Directed by	Written by	Original release date	Prod. code
21	1	"Into the New World"	Jen Bennett	Serena Wu	June 14, 2026	301
Following Brainiac's defeat, Clark and Kara enter their new expanded Fortress of Solitude. After Kara installs Brainiac's core to the Fortress' system, she is greeted by a holographic projection of him, who taunts Kara about her new perspective, as she questions who she really is. One year later on Halloween, Clark, Lois, Jimmy and Kara celebrate at the Kents' farm, where Clark tells Lois his plans for their future. Lois is informed by Sam about a secret bioenergetics program called Project Caliban, and asks Superman to investigate. The gang enters the facility and they discover they were trying to clone Kryptonians, where they are attacked by a cloned Kryptonian, as Superman chases him down. Meanwhile, Supergirl finds out that the clone was raised by Dr. George Otto Binder with love, and compares that to how she was raised as a weapon. Superman and the clone are ambushed by a drone made from Kryptonian technology, but Superman repels it, causing it and the facility to self-destruct. The clone pulls an unconscious Superman from the facility and goes into hiding in Metropolis. Meanwhile at LexCorp, it is revealed that Luthor sent the drone. Deeming Project Caliban a failure, he and Wilson decide to visit Henshaw, who was put on life-support after he was badly shot down during Brainiac's invasion.
22	2	"Mobile Suit Toyman"	Chris Palmer	Angela Entzminger	June 21, 2026	302
Clark, Lois, Jimmy and Kara attend Super-Fest, where Jimmy publishes his own comic book series, Superman's Pal Jimmy Olsen. Meanwhile, Lois spots Winslow Schott at the convention, and she and Clark decide to follow him. Kara tells Jimmy about her feelings for him, but he turns her down, believing that there could be someone more worthy of her. Meanwhile, Superman is called to stop a Russian thief, calling herself the Whip equipped with Kryptonite-powered technology. Back at the Super-Fest, Kara as Supergirl is interviewed by Cat, where she begins to feel anxious about herself because of Cat's questions. A young girl named Jessica Cruz reminds her how brave she is and wishes to be as brave as her; motivated by this and heartbroken over Jimmy, Kara publicly expresses that she is seeking out a "mate", but Jimmy still does not want to reciprocate her feelings at all. Luthor informs Jimmy of a special presentation he's organizing. Tricked by Lois, Schott activates a giant robot and causes havoc at the convention. Before Clark can intervene, Schott is stopped by a cybernetically rebuilt Henshaw who brutally beats down Schott's robot. Luthor announces Henshaw as a real American hero.
23	3	"All's Fair in Love and W.O.R.M.S."	Grace Liu	Jack Sentell	June 28, 2026	303
Now being labeled as "Cyborg Superman", Henshaw brands his own way of justice in Metropolis, which disturbs some of the citizens. Meanwhile, Jimmy desperately tries to convince himself he does not love Kara at all, and enters the dating center known as World Organization for Romantic Matchmaking Science, so he can get a new match up and move on from Kara once and for all. Jimmy meets a woman named Doris, who injects him with a chemical that turns him into a werewolf. Meanwhile, Intergang tries to steal equipment from LexCorp, only for Henshaw to brutally subdue them. Superman intervernes and saves McDougal from being killed by Henshaw. Luthor scolds Henshaw and tells him to restrain himself, or the public will never accept him as a hero. Henshaw refuses to listen and beats down Wilson, but Luthor zaps him with a remote. Determined to win Jimmy back, Kara tries enlisting on a dating app called Crushrush, but due to not having any hobbies, and seeing how Jimmy still does not want to feel the same for her, Lois tries to help her discover more about Earth's culture by taking her to the mall. But this only makes Kara feel more depressed about Jimmy not liking her back, and a musical number ensues in which Kara and Lois sing about their differing views about the future. Jimmy finds a cure for his condition with the help of W.O.R.M.S. CEO Zazzala. Obsessed with Jimmy, Doris sprays herself, turning into a giant, and kidnaps Jimmy. Superman, Zazzala, and her girlfriend Tazzala save Jimmy and turn Doris back to normal size. Back at their apartment, Lois tells Clark she does not feel ready to settle down with him. Meanwhile in a dystopian future, Luthor sends Superboy back in time before he, Jimmy and Dr. Irons are disintegrated by Kryptonian drones.
24	4	"Guess Who's Slammin' to Dinner?"	Jen Bennett	Sari Cooper	July 5, 2026	304
While having brunch, Clark and Lois meet Superboy, who introduces himself as their son Jon Kent from the future. Clark, Jimmy, and Kara are excited, but Lois feels unsettled. The gang goes to the mall where Jon spends time with his family. Metropolis is soon attacked by a race of subterranean dinosauroids called Subterranosauri. When Superman freezes its leading warrior Krull, the Subterranosauri leader Prince Tyrannko emerges to voice his dismay towards the humans for trying to encroach on their own. Superboy talks to Tyrannko and offers a truce between humans and Subterranosauri. At LexCorp, Henshaw attacks Luthor and destroys the remote controling him. Blaming Luthor for his current state, he takes control of the Kryptonian drones. Meanwhile, Jon and the gang spend time at the Kent farm, with Lois and Jon spending more time together and connecting with each other. At the farm, they learn that Henshaw has attacked Metropolis and is challenging Superman to a fight. Jon reveals to Lois that both her and Superman are dead in the future, and the reason he traveled back in time is to save the world from Henshaw.
25	5	"The Death of Superman"	Chris Palmer	Marguerite Bennett	July 12, 2026	305
Superman and Supergirl arrive at Metropolis, where they fight Henshaw and his army of Kryptonian drones. Jon reveals to Lois that Henshaw killed Superman in his future and that he traveled back in time with the help of Luthor. As Supergirl fights Henshaw's drones, Superman struggles against Henshaw. Superboy appears and saves him. At LexCorp, Lois and Jimmy try to persuade Luthor to help them, in which he reluctantly agrees. Henshaw begins to poison Superman with his Kryptonite power core. Luthor tries to hack into Henshaw's system, but he fails after Henshaw breaks into LexCorp and knocks him down. Worried about Kara, Jon tells her to stay away, revealing that she was the one who raised him after his parents' deaths before she herself was killed. Superboy and Supergirl team up against Henshaw and overpower him, before he uses parts of his drones to rebuild himself. Superman overcomes his Kryptonite poisoning through force of will and removes Henshaw's Kryptonite core. Defeated, Henshaw starts to self-destruct to kill them all, but powers down instead after realizing that Jon is half-human. Clark reveals to Lois that he lost his powers in the fight, and Jon bids farewell to his parents and returns to the future. Instead of his original timeline, Jon returns to a second dystopian future ruled by Luthor, where he is captured by Slade Wilson.
26	6	"Party Animals"	Grace Liu	Serena Wu	July 19, 2026	306
One month after Henshaw's attack, Clark, Lois, and Jimmy attend the 10th Annual Metropolis Humanitarian Gala hosted by Silver St. Cloud. Lois, Jimmy, and Kara are nominated for rewards. Although Superman is also nominated, Clark refuses to make appearance as he is still trying to cope with the loss of his powers. Jimmy's W.O.R.M.S.-arranged date, Princess Marina Maru of Markovia, makes Kara feel jealous. Vale also appears in the gala, and she challenges Lois into a scoop war. Hearing about the gala, the Kryptonian clone decides to attend to see Superman. While wandering around, the Newskid Legion stumbles upon some armed goons ready to attack the event. While Clark searches for them, he sees a vision of the Fortress of Solitude calling him. Upon hearing the kids in danger, Clark saves the kids before he gets shot. Maru reveals herself as Doctor Poison, and unleashes a gas that turns everyone but Clark and Kara into a talking animal. Kara apprehends Maru, but not before revealing her plan of poisoning the entire water supply. Kara as Supergirl arrives at the dam and stops the gas, while the Kryptonian clone finishes the goons off. Jimmy tricks Maru into letting down her guard so he could remove her mask, turning her into a dog. Following the event, Lois is given the award by Silver, leaving Vale jealous. Jimmy apologizes to Kara about how he treated her and Clark breaks down for not being able to help due to not having his powers anymore. A mysterious portal appears and sucks the gang in.
27	7	"The Ex Games"	Jen Bennett	Sari Cooper	July 26, 2026	307
Mxyzptlk, who has kidnapped the gang, forces them to play games against alternate versions of Lois (General Lane), Jimmy (Flamebird Jimmy), Luthor (Good Luthor), and Kara (Scion Kara), claiming the game decides the divorce settlements with his wife, Ms. Gsptlsnz. Both teams tie in the first challenge. In the second challenge, Lois and Kara face their doppelgängers, while Clark and Jimmy face against Good Luthor and Flamebird Jimmy. During their challenges, General Lane and Flamebird Jimmy reveal that their universe's Superman lost his powers and was killed during the Hunger Dogs' invasion. Good Luthor's team wins the second challenge. In the third challenge, the teams must navigate a maze which forces them to choose their "one true path". Clark breaks down over the loss of his powers, Lois is haunted by her alternate versions and sees Superman's death, and Kara starts to question if her path is predetermined. Jimmy apologies to Kara for his behavior and vows to change for the better. Kara deduces that the maze showed them that they can shape the future, allowing the gang to escape the maze. Before the final challenge begins, both teams realize that the competition is a farce, and that Mxyzptlk and Gsptlsnz are forcing them to compete to obtain a cosmic anvil, a powerful tool that is capable of reshaping the universe. Realizing there is a time limit, Clark and the others refuse to continue the competition, ensuring that Mxyzptlk and Gsptlsnz do not receive the cosmic anvil. After returning to their universe, Clark begins to accept that he might never be Superman again, just as Jon returns to the past with a young woman.
28	8	"It's Reigning (Super) Men"	Chris Palmer	Angela Entzminger	August 2, 2026	308
Clark and Lois meet with Jon, now going by Jonathan Lane and who comes from another timeline, along with his sister Lara. At the Kent farm, they learn that the siblings have traveled back in time to kill Luthor, by orders of Lois herself. Meanwhile, Clark tries to connect with Jonathan, but he rebuffs him, angry and bitter since Clark wasn't there for him. Clark is haunted by another vision of the Fortress of Solitude. At LexCorp, Waller and representatives of Checkmate visit Luthor who reveals his Project Eradicator, a clone made out of Superman's DNA and Luthor's grey matter sample. Seeing how unstable Luthor has become, Waller decides to shut down LexCorp, just as Lara arrives to kill Luthor. Luthor unleashes the Eradicator on her. The gang rushes to LexCorp, where they are attacked by the Eradicator. Supergirl, Jonathan, and Lara engage in combat with the Eradicator, who easily overpowers them. Not willing to let her family die, Supergirl sacrifices herself to save the siblings from the Eradicator. Jonathan brutalizes the Eradicator in his rage, just as he steals Jonathan's time machine and vanishes in the timestream. In the aftermath, Waller has Wilson arrest Luthor. Knowing now how to restore his powers, Clark and the Kryptonian clone travel to the Fortress, where the stewards mind control the clone and use him to knock Clark unconscious.
29	9	"Vae Victis"	Grace Liu	Jake Wyatt	August 9, 2026	309
Clark wakes up in the Fortress, where he is greeted by the stewards who identify themselves as the Brainiac of Old. They offer to restore Clark's powers if he proves he is worthy. Brainiac explains to Clark how the ancient Kryptonians gained their powers and puts him through a test: conquer the invaders and he will restore Clark's powers. Clark is attacked by those invaders, where he falls off a cliff along with their Coluan leader. Instead of fighting, Clark helps the injured leader back to the camp, which leaves Brainiac dissatisfied. Clark figures out that the Coluan "invaders" are refugees, and the leader was Brainiac who was turned into an artificial intelligence. Brainiac rages over the idea that its 10,000 years of servitude to Kryptonians was unnecessary. Before he can kill Clark, the Kryptonian clone breaks free. Meanwhile, Lois and Jimmy make a reluctant alliance with Waller. After Kara awakens, Kara talks to Jonathan at Lois's behest, who thinks he will never be as perfect as his father. Kara assures him that Clark is perfect due to his imperfections. After Luthor pinpoints the Eradicator's next appearance in the same place Zero Day happened, Checkmate and the gang drive there and prepare for the invasion, alongside Livewire, Heat Wave, Agent Avery, Agent Martin, and Dr. Irons, who forges new weapons for the siblings. As Luthor tries to leave, Jimmy stops him and tells him to take responsibility for his actions. The next morning, an evolved Eradicator arrives as Jonathan slices him in half. The Eradicator duplicates himself into a brutish form and takes down Jonathan.
30	10	"The Return"	Jen Bennett	Karen Graci	August 16, 2026	310
Clark tames the clone, earning the trust of the Head Steward. When Clark mentions the name "Rao" from his visions, the stewards show him the offspring of Krypton's sun, which restores his powers. Meanwhile, the Eradicator has taken down Checkmate's forces, forcing Waller to retreat. Lois decides to stay with her family. Luthor designs a device who will allow him to take control of the Eradicator. Before he can use it though, Checkmate forces him and Jimmy to a helicopter, which crashes. Wilson lets them go as Luthor thanks him. The Eradicator creates more brutish duplicates who nearly take down the Kryptonians. Luthor tries to get inside the Eradicator's mind, but fails. Before Eradicator can finish them, Superman returns and saves them. Superman apologizes to Jonathan for not being there as he embraces his children. The now united House of El and the clone stop the duplicates as Superman fights the Eradicator. After almost damaging his suit, Superman defeats the Eradicator, devolving him in the process. As Superman offers to help him, the Eradicator refuses and disintegrates. Superman and Lois bid farewell to their children as they return to the future. As Luthor is imprisoned at Stryker's, he warns Waller that new galaxies have emerged since Kandor's destruction. At the Kent farm, Kara and Jimmy play with Clark and Lois' new dog Krypto as Lois proposes to Clark.

== Production ==
=== Development ===
In May 2021, it was announced that a two-season order had been placed for My Adventures with Superman, with the series initially planned to air on Cartoon Network and stream on HBO Max. It was revealed that Jack Quaid and Alice Lee would voice Clark Kent / Superman and Lois Lane respectively. Jake Wyatt and Brendan Clogher were onboard as co-executive producers, and Josie Campbell was a producer. Sam Register was also an executive producer. Wyatt, Clogher, and Campbell served as showrunners. No major updates were given until March 2023, when it was announced that the series would no longer air on Cartoon Network, but rather on its nighttime block Adult Swim, despite the series not necessarily being produced to target an adult demographic. Following the formation of DC Studios, the production crew showed the series' opening sequence to co-CEO James Gunn, who reportedly "liked" the series and allowed it to continue production without interference. A third season was announced to be in production in June 2024. After its release in summer 2026, Jake Wyatt confirmed in an interview with The Ringer that James Gunn and Peter Safran encouraged the team to incorporate the planned arc for Season 4 into the closing episodes of Season 3. Safran later said in October of that year that the series' future is unclear due to the crew focusing on the spin-off My Adventures with Green Lantern.

=== Writing ===
The team behind the show wanted to explore the early years of Clark, Lois, and Jimmy Olsen and their jobs at the Daily Planet, something that Campbell felt had rarely been touched in previous Superman media. Campbell described the three characters as the heart of the show, adding that their bond and time with each other drives "the series and the character arcs for both season one and two." She also expressed the romance between Lois and Clark as being very important to the team and something that would unfold as the series progressed. They also wanted to emphasize on Superman's humanity by exploring his personal relationships.

Campbell cited the original Richard Donner Superman (1978) film as a huge influence for the series, especially for the interplay between Margot Kidder's Lois and Christopher Reeve's Superman: "We loved their chemistry; we loved how smart and feisty Lois was, and loved the heart and altruism of Reeve's Superman / Clark Kent. The movie was clever, fun, and modernized Superman in a way that felt organic to the time period, while also respectful of what came before. It truly is one of our favorite pieces of Superman media." Just like the film, they sought for My Adventures with Superman to have a "wide co-viewing audience, where kids, teens, and adults can all sit down and watch together." Influences for the series include the 1986 comic book limited series The Man of Steel, as well as the works of Dan Jurgens, Jon Bogdanove, and Louise Simonson.

The third season of the series is inspired by the 1993 comic book storyline "Reign of the Supermen". Showrunner Jake Wyatt stated that it will not be a retread of the comics and that it is more about, "What would we do with that premise now? It's less Death [of Superman] and more about, 'What's a Superman?' The fun thing about Reign of the Supermen is that it's all these impostors who have the same power set but different values."

On future storylines for the series Jake Wyatt says, "The way things end in season 3 sets us up for a bigger, more structured conflict in [season 4] that is sort of an All-Star Superman situation that pulls Lex back in." Brendan Clogher has a plan for the end of the series that's "an absolute curveball" and Mister Mxyzptlk has a key part to play in the show's endgame.

=== Animation and design ===
The series features anime-influenced animation provided by Studio Mir in Seoul for the first two seasons and Studio Grida, also in Seoul, for the third season. Additionally, Superman's transformation sequence is inspired by Pretty Cure, specifically Cure Mermaid from Go! Princess PreCure, as series director Diana Huh noted on social media. Campbell later acknowledged this in an interview with Crunchyroll, saying the show's creative team agreed with storyboarder Jessica Zammit's suggestion to add a magical transformation sequence and she later, in Campbell's words, saw it was "like Pretty Cure" and the creative team agreed to put it into the series, expressing their support. She also told the Crunchyroll interviewer that the series was inspired by shounen anime, and series such as Neon Genesis Evangelion, Gurren Lagann, and Shin Godzilla.

=== Casting ===
Producer Josie Campbell greatly enjoyed working with Jack Quaid. Campbell said that Quaid had great comedic timing as Clark but was also able to "sell the kindness, strength, and dignity of Superman." In June 2022, Michael Emerson announced that he would play Brainiac. In April 2023, it was confirmed that Ishmel Sahid would play Jimmy Olsen. In May 2026, it was announced that Darren Criss had been cast as Superboy in season 3. He previously played Clark Kent / Superman in the Tomorrowverse DC animated movies.

== Release ==
My Adventures with Superman premiered on Adult Swim on July 7, 2023, with a 2-episode special, and also released on HBO Max shortly after its televised airing. It then encored on the network's Toonami programming block on Saturday nights with additional reruns on Cartoon Network's ACME Night block. The second season premiered on Adult Swim on May 26, 2024, shifting its premieres to the Toonami programming block. On June 13, 2025, Toonami announced that a My Adventures with Superman season 2 marathon would air on July 5 to promote the release of Superman (2025). The third season premiered on June 14, 2026.

=== Marketing ===
A teaser trailer was released in April 2023. A full-length trailer announcing the premiere date released on June 5, 2023. A promotional clip of season one was revealed on June 29, 2023.

=== International broadcast ===
My Adventures with Superman aired on Cartoon Network and Adult Swim in Canada and on Cartoon Network and HBO Max in Latin America. In the United Kingdom, the series was made available for streaming on Channel 4 on October 17, 2023, and later premiered through linear television on E4 on October 20, 2023. The series became available for streaming in Europe on December 11, 2023, on HBO Max, in countries where the service is available. The series also premiered in Quebec on Télétoon on September 28, 2024. The series aired on Cartoon Network in Japan from November 23, 2024.

=== Home media ===
Warner Bros. Discovery Home Entertainment released the first season of My Adventures with Superman on DVD in the United States on May 14, 2024.

== Reception ==
=== Critical response ===
The series received positive reviews from critics. On the review aggregator website Rotten Tomatoes the series has a rating of 100% based on 47 reviews. The critics consensus reads, "Seamlessly transposing Superman into the style of shōnen anime, these Adventures give the character a refreshing paint job while retaining his quintessential charm." Polly Conway of Common Sense Media rated the show 4/5 stars, describing the show as "a lighthearted and fun fresh start for the classic superhero," and adding that "kids who aren't quite ready for serious superhero movies will be thrilled with the battles and challenges the crew must face."

Samantha Nelson of IGN rated the show an 8/10, saying it "fuses DC Comics canon and shonen anime tropes to put a fresh and charming spin on the Man of Steel," and adding that "while there are a few weaker characters, the show's first seven episodes show huge potential driven by weird villains, complex fights and a tight ensemble." Lauren Sarner of the New York Post described it as "nothing revolutionary, or especially clever, but it's lighthearted and peppered with some amusing moments." Michael Thomas of Collider stated that "while the series does have a few pacing issues, and a lack of a strong supporting cast, it more than makes up for it with its slick art and strong leading trio."

=== Accolades ===
Year	Award	Category	Recipient	Result	Ref.
2024	Saturn Awards	Best Animated Television Series or Special		Nominated	
2024	TCA Awards	Outstanding Achievement in Family Programming		Nominated	
2024	The Women's Image Awards	Animated Program		Nominated	
2024	The Women's Image Awards	Actress Animated Program	Alice Lee	Nominated	
2025	Annie Awards	Best TV/Media – Limited Series		Nominated	

== Other media ==
=== Comic book series ===
A six issue comic book miniseries based on My Adventures with Superman with the same name, written by series producer and comics writer Josie Campbell and drawn by artist Pablo M. Collar, was published by DC Comics between June 4 and November 6, 2024. The comic series picks up from the end of season one and serves as a bridge to season two of the series. The series was first announced in March of that year with Campbell stating that the comic series is an unproduced story from season one, and that it would connect "emotionally" with the second season.

=== Spin-off ===
In February 2025, a spin-off series titled My Adventures with Green Lantern was announced to be in development. The series will take place in the same timeline as My Adventures with Superman and will explore and expand on that universe. The series will focus on Jessica Cruz, a teenager who is chosen to become part of the Green Lantern Corps and ends up facing the consequences of an ancient war between the Green Lantern Corps and its enemies. The series will be produced by DC Studios and Warner Bros. Animation, with My Adventures with Superman co-showrunner Jake Wyatt as executive producer. In August 2025, the series was described, by Wyatt, as "fun", as he stated, on social media "if you hate fun, you are gonna have a real bad time." It was also reported that DC Studios will produce the project, while Studio Mir will animate the series, with Sarah Noonan and Agnes Kim as casting directors, and a casting call noted that those who can sing and are 18 or older, able to play a 14-15 year old Latina character, Jessica, who is said to be "lovable, relatable, plucky, overthinker, [and a] ball of anxiety." Jessica Cruz appeared in the second episode of the third season of My Adventures with Superman, voiced by Auliʻi Cravalho.
