= Ms. Gsptlsnz =

- Ms. Gsptlsnz as she appeared in Action Comics #975 (May 2017). Art by Ian Churchill.

Publication information
- Publisher: DC Comics
- First appearance: Superman's Pal Jimmy Olsen #52 (April 1964)
- Created by: Jerry Siegel; Curt Swan

In-story information
- Species: Fifth-dimensional imp (Zrfffian)
- Place of origin: 5th Dimension
- Partnerships: Mister Mxyzptlk
- Notable aliases: Gizbie; Nyxlygsptlnz
- Abilities: Nigh-omnipotence; Advanced technology

Ms. Gsptlsnz (/ɡɪzˈpɪtləznəz/ giz-PIT-ləz-nəz), sometimes called Gizpy, is a character who appears in American comic books published by DC Comics. She is a 5th Dimensional Imp commonly in association with the superhero Superman.

Nyxlygsptlnz appears in the sixth season of the Arrowverse series Supergirl, portrayed by Peta Sergeant.

== Publication history ==
She was created by Jerry Siegel and Curt Swan, and first appeared in Superman's Pal Jimmy Olsen #52 (April 1964).

== Fictional character biography ==
Gzptlsnz first appeared in the comic book series Superman's Pal Jimmy Olsen as a female imp from the same fifth-dimensional plane as Mister Mxyzptlk. Mxyzptlk referred to her as his girlfriend, though Gzptlsnz developed a crush on Jimmy Olsen.

In post-Crisis continuity, Gzptlsnz reappeared in JLA #31 as the leader of a council of imps passing judgement on Qwsp when he went rogue.

Gsptlsnz is later seen in Countdown to Final Crisis when Mxyzptlk is pulled through a portal by Monarch, and again when Mxyzptlk escapes.

In 2011, "The New 52" rebooted the DC universe. In the first issue of the relaunched Action Comics, Mrs. Nyxly was introduced as Clark Kent's landlady. She is aware of Clark's secret identity as Superman. Nyxly is later revealed to be a princess from the fifth dimension. Her real name is Nyxlygsptlnz, also referred to as Ms. Gspltlnz, and she is the wife of Mr. Mxyzptlk and daughter of King Brpxz.

== Powers and abilities ==
Gsptlsnz possesses the same powers and weaknesses as other imps, including the ability to fly, teleport, and manipulate reality.

== In other media ==
Ms. Gsptlsnz as she appears in Superman: The Animated Series.

- Gsptlsnz appears in Superman: The Animated Series, voiced by Sandra Bernhard in the episode "Mxyzpixilated" and Jennifer Hale in "Little Big Head Man".
- Nyxlygsptlnz, also known as Nyxly, appears in the sixth season of Supergirl, portrayed by Peta Sergeant. This version was banished to the Phantom Zone by her father King Brpxz.
- Gsptlsnz appears in the My Adventures with Superman episode "The Ex Games", voiced by Erin Anderson. This version has more of a pixie-like appearance. She and Mxyzptlk try using Superman, Lois, Jimmy, and Kara into unlocking a cosmic anvil, by staging a divorce between them.
