= Mister Mxyzptlk =

Fictional character in DC comics

- Mister Mxyzptlk as depicted in Action Comics #975 (March 2017). Art by Ian Churchill.

Publication information
- Publisher: DC Comics
- First appearance: Superman #30 (Sept. / Oct. 1944)
- Created by: Jerry Siegel (writer); Joe Shuster (artist)

In-story information
- Species: Fifth Dimensional Imp (Zrfffian)
- Place of origin: Fifth Dimension
- Partnerships: Ms. Gsptlsnz
- Notable aliases: Master Mxyzptlk
- Abilities: Reality Warping; Nigh-Omnipotence; Magic Mastery; Cartoon physics

Mister Mxyzptlk (/ˌmɪksjɛzˈpɪtəlɪk/ or /ˈmɪksɪlplɪk/), sometimes called Mxy, is a supervillain who appears in American comic books published by DC Comics. He is usually presented as a trickster in the classical mythological sense. Mxyzptlk possesses reality-warping powers with which he enjoys tormenting Superman or making life difficult. His portrayal has varied, with him being an outright villain in some media, and an antihero in others.

Mr. Mxyzptlk was created to appear in Superman #30 (September / October 1944), in the story "The Mysterious Mr. Mxyztplk" (the original spelling), by writer Jerry Siegel and artist Ira Yarborough. Due to publishing lag time, the character saw print first in the Superman daily comic strip by writer Whitney Ellsworth and artist Wayne Boring.

In most of Mxyzptlk's appearances in DC Comics, he can be stopped only by tricking him into saying or spelling his own name backwards, which will return him to his home in the fifth dimension and keep him there for a minimum of 90 days. This limitation of the character was modified in the 1986 Crisis on Infinite Earths reboot, upon which Mxyzptlk changes his condition to lead to a new requirement each story, such as having Superman succeed in getting him to paint his own face blue.

Mxyzptlk has appeared in various television adaptations of Superman. He first appeared in the 1966 animated series The New Adventures of Superman, voiced by Gilbert Mack, and later appeared in Hanna-Barbera's Super Friends franchise, voiced by Frank Welker, the 1988-1992 television series Superboy, portrayed by Michael J. Pollard, and the 1993 television series Lois & Clark: The New Adventures of Superman, portrayed by Howie Mandel. He also appeared in the 2001 television series Smallville played by Trent Ford, and in the Arrowverse television series Supergirl played by Peter Gadiot in the second season, and by Thomas Lennon in the fifth and sixth seasons, while Gilbert Gottfried prominently voiced the character in several voice-acting-related projects until his death.

== Biography ==
=== Golden Age ===
Cover to Action Comics #80 (January 1945), art by Wayne Boring.

Mister Mxyztplk (the original spelling) was introduced in the Golden Age as an imp from the "fifth dimension". Not being bound by physical laws, he can do things that seem to be magical. In his first appearance, Mxyztplk wreaks havoc across Metropolis by using his powers to pull all manner of pranks, first pretending he got hit by a truck and killed, then increasing his weight when the ambulance gets there and waking up to shock them. What is more, he destroys Superman's worldview of himself. Mxyztplk jumps out a window, fooling Superman into thinking he is committing suicide. When he appears unharmed, an astonished Superman exclaims, "I-I thought I was the only man who could fly!!" He gives the Mayor the voice of a donkey, and then blows papers over the town. Mxyztplk soon tells Superman that he is a jester in his home dimension, explaining why he uses his powers to play practical jokes, but one day he finds a book that tells him of this world.

Originally, Mxyztplk has designs on conquering the planet for himself but soon settles for tormenting Superman whenever he gets the opportunity. His only weaknesses are that he cannot stand being ridiculed and if he says or spells his name backward, he is involuntarily sent back to his home dimension for a minimum of 90 days. He first gets fooled when Superman asks what the word is and the imp says he can't believe Superman would have thought him stupid enough to say "Klptzyxm"--before realizing what he has just said and being transported home. Mxyztplk often looks for ways to counter the latter weakness, but he always proves gullible enough for Superman to trick him time and time again. In the Golden Age, saying "Klptzyxm" will not only send Mxyztplk back to the fifth dimension but also anyone else who said it. To return to his/her home dimension, one has to say one's own name backward.

=== Silver Age ===
Cover to Action Comics #273 (February 1961), art by Curt Swan.

Mxyztplk originally appeared as a small bald man in a purple suit, green bow tie, and purple derby hat. This was changed to a futuristic looking orange outfit with purple trim and white hair on the sides of his head in the mid-1950s, although the bowler hat remains adapted to the new color scheme. In Superman #131 (1959), the spelling of Mxyztplk's name changed (by some accounts through a mistake) to "Mxyzptlk".

It was explained in the Silver Age Superman comics that Mister Mxyzptlk could affect Superman because Superman is susceptible to magic, which was established as a major weakness for the superhero.

When a Mxyzptlk jaunt causes a special appearance by Superman to be cancelled and children, who had done nothing to Mxyzptlk, to be disappointed, Superman himself decides to turn the tables and visit the fifth dimension, making trouble for the imp, who is running for mayor. For example, when Mxyzptlk furnishes a huge supply of food for prospective voters, he says, "Eat up, folks, the food's on me!" Superman uses super-breath to blow the food all over the imp and then chortles to the voters, "Like he said, folks – the food is on him!" The imp tries to get the Man of Steel to say "Namrepus" (Superman backwards) repeatedly, but when he finally succeeds, it does not work and Superman remains in the fifth dimension. Mxyzptlk ultimately loses the election, and, his mission accomplished, Superman returns to Earth by whispering "Le-Lak" (his Kryptonian birth name Kal-El backwards).

=== Multiverse ===
After the establishment of DC Comics' Multiverse in the 1960s, it was later explained that the purple-suited Mxyztplk lives in the fifth dimension connected to Earth-Two, and the orange-costumed Mxyzptlk in the fifth dimension connected to Earth-One. The Earth-One version is also retconned into Superboy stories as the young red-haired Master Mxyzptlk, who bedevils Superboy during his youth in Smallville. He even appears as a deus ex machina to stop the Kryptonite Kid, who was killing a helpless Superboy, so that he could continue to bedevil Superboy and, later, Superman.

A 30th-century descendant of Mxyzptlk appeared in Adventure Comics #310 (July 1963) with similar abilities. Much crueler than his ancestor, this version kills most of the Legion of Super-Heroes until Superboy tricks him into falling victim to the same "Kltpzyxm" weakness, reversing the effects of his magic. However, in another story from Adventure Comics #355 (April 1967) featuring the 30th-century Adult Legion, the brother of the cruel Mxyzptlk teams up with a descendant of Lex Luthor to save the Legionnaires from the Legion of Super-Villains and join the Legion themselves.

=== Whatever Happened to the Man of Tomorrow? ===
Alan Moore offered a radically different interpretation of the character in the 1986 two-issue story Superman: Whatever Happened to the Man of Tomorrow?, a possible end of the adventures of the Earth-One Superman. Mister Mxyzptlk (appearing in darker colors and looking more sinister than in the past) explains that the problem with immortality is finding ways to spend the time. He spent his first 2,000 years without moving or breathing, the next 2,000 years doing only good deeds, and the following 2,000 years being the mischievous character that he is normally portrayed as. He has now decided to try being evil, and is responsible for all of the nightmarish events in the story (also musing that after 2,000 years of evil, he may spend the next 2,000 years feeling guilty). Before attacking Superman, he reveals his true form, which is described by Lois Lane as having "height, width, breadth, and a couple of other things". He is killed when Superman sends him to the Phantom Zone at the same time that Mister Mxyzptlk begins an escape to the fifth dimension by saying his name backwards voluntarily, tearing him in two. Despite having recognized that his foe was too dangerous to be stopped any other way, remorse over the killing prompts Superman to drain himself of his powers using gold kryptonite.

Another final appearance of Mister Mxyzptlk was in the final issue of DC Comics Presents, which shows Jor-El's discovery of the Phantom Zone. By the end of the story, the Phantom Zone, the fifth dimension and Bizarro World are all destroyed, and Mister Mxyzptlk, infilled by power endowed by a hideously disfigured wizard who was a denizen in the Phantom Zone, is transformed into an entity not even remotely human. He then throws the dead Argo City into Metropolis, littering it with kryptonite and dead Kryptonians, and announces to an exasperated and horrified Superman that this was his last jest, that he will never be able to top it, and so says farewell to Superman.

=== Modern Age ===
Mxyzptlk made it through Crisis on Infinite Earths relatively unchanged, although the unpleasant nature of his pranks and the psychological effects they have on others is played up more, such as when he animated the Daily Planet building heedless of the occupants inside who were being violently thrown around with its movements. He also began smoking cigars, symbolic of his newer, more antagonistic nature. His first appearance in this new continuity saw him initially adopting the guise of "Ben deRoy", a reality-warping mystery man resembling the Beyonder (the former name is an anagram of the latter), who was threatening the Marvel Universe around the same time. He resumed his more familiar appearance when he was confronted by Superman.

In his first post-Crisis story, Mxyzptlk played the "Name Game" with Superman, with saying or writing his name backwards sending him home. However, in his next appearance, this has no effect; the "condition" that would send him back to the fifth dimension would be anything he stated it to be for the occasion, and the act itself would not banish him, but instead be Mxyzptlk abiding by his own terms. After his first encounter with Lex Luthor taught him how to lie, Mxyzptlk began rigging his contests with false or misleading aspects to make his challenges greater. Ultimately, the stories reverted to Mxyzptlk having to say his name backwards to get him to leave.

One of Mxyzptlk's most prominent storylines in the new continuity was the "Krisis of the Krimson Kryptonite" storyline, when he provided Lex Luthor with a sample of red kryptonite that took away Superman's powers so long as Luthor never revealed to Superman that Mxyzptlk was involved. Despite Superman's lack of powers, he still risked his life to battle Mammoth and the mad scientist Thaddeus Killgrave. Eventually, the spell was lifted when Luthor told "Clark Kent" where the red kryptonite had come from, believing that he would not be breaking Mxyzptlk's rule about not letting Superman know the truth if he told Kent and Kent told Superman (in a one-page aside in this story, Mister Mxyzptlk is implied to also be the Impossible Man, spending his off-time badgering the Fantastic Four of the Marvel Universe).

Many of Mxyzptlk's later stories have a metafictional element, similar to Ambush Bug, as this iteration of Myx comments on his status as a fictional character such as discussing editorial decisions or clichés of the genre. This was most obvious in Superman: The Man of Steel #75, a pastiche of Superman's death in Superman (vol. 2) #75, where Mxyzptlk creates a duplicate of Doomsday. The confrontation culminates with Mxyzptlk meeting the Supreme Being, who turns out to be Mike Carlin, the then-editor of the Superman titles, who promptly brings him back to life. Although Mxyzptlk does not appear in Grant Morrison's JLA, Morrison took advantage of certain similarities to tie Johnny Thunder's Thunderbolt and Aquaman's nemesis Qwsp to the fifth dimension, implying the dimension may be the origin for legends of djinn. This story also saw the first post-Crisis appearance of Mxyzptlk's Earth-One girlfriend, Ms. Gsptlsnz (described as his "quinto-partner"; pronounced Giz-pit-lez-nez or "Gizbie" for short).

In 2001, DC published Bizarro Comics in which Mister Mxyzptlk fought an all-powerful entity named A who is conquering and wrecking dimensional worlds—including the 5th dimension—by use of toys and games. Mxyzptlk retains the services of a version of Bizarro who calls him Greg, and pads the story out by writing and drawing 27 off-beat stories using the DC superheroes, taking 160 pages. Bizarro is in two of them. Also of note is the depiction of Bahdnesian thunderbolts and Zook's species as native to the fifth dimension.

In Countdown to Final Crisis, the modern Mxyzptlk claims to have always felt the need for a "public" in the third dimension and that Superman was not his first victim.

=== Secret origin ===
In Young Justice #3, Peter David showed Mxyzptlk's origins as a serious-minded researcher, who travels through time, summoned by computer-based occultists. He takes the opportunity to conduct some scholarly studies. He chooses to examine a Halloween party in Happy Harbor, focusing on the results of aging a portion of the teens and causing some of the others to frantically dance out of control. Unbeknownst to Mxyzptlk, Robin, Superboy, and Impulse were hired by the town's adults to chaperone the party. When the boys confront Mxyzptlk, they realize that this was not the same Mxyzptlk whom Superman had regularly faced; indeed, he appears to not have even assumed the name "Mxyzptlk" at this point, regarding it as sounding like something somebody randomly typed (which is, indeed, how the character chose his name in his first post-Crisis appearance). Upon discovering the chaotic future that awaits him, Mxyzptlk declares that he would dedicate his life to learning and knowledge. However, those words led to a shift in time, creating an apocalyptic world everywhere but outside the building where the Halloween party is being held. This is because Mxyzptlk was not left to annoy Superman. To avoid this, Robin, Superboy, and Impulse realize that they need to instill Mxyzptlk with his trademark wacky sense of humor.

A Three Stooges film is uncovered and watched via an old projector. Mxyzptlk is entertained by the comedy in the film, and tries out a Stooge-style poke in the eye on the projectionist Mick Gurk (an homage to the name "McGurk", the name used by Mxyztplk for a statue he animated in his first appearance), finding the slapstick humor to his liking. He promises that, when it is time, he will hassle Superman as he is supposed to, in honor of Superboy, Impulse, Robin, and Gurk. Time is largely restored to normal. Outside the civic center is an unexpected Mxyzptlk theme park, the only change to the world.

However, it appears that Mxyzptlk has forgotten this incident as the years have passed. When confronted by Superboy later on, the imp declares that he had no knowledge of his adventure with Young Justice. Whether or not this is true, or Mxyzptlk was merely playing a trick on Superboy, is never revealed.

=== Improper use of power ===
In "Emperor Joker", a multi-issue story throughout the Superman titles, Mxyzptlk has his powers temporarily stolen by the Joker, who remakes the Earth in his own image, due to tricking Mxyzptlk into giving him 99.99% of his power, when Mxyzptlk only intended to give Joker 1% of his power. The imp is unable to remember what to do to break the chain of events that daily culminates with Superman being dragged back to Arkham Asylum by Bizarro. Fortunately, Mxyzptlk is able to reveal the truth to Superman, who manages to find the power to break the cycle and defeat the Joker. As the Joker prepares to end existence, Superman realizes that, for all his power, the Joker still cannot erase Batman (as the Joker defines his very existence by fighting Batman, erasing him would also mean erasing himself), allowing Superman to shatter the Joker's control of reality. However, Mxyzptlk saves some of the Joker's creations and transfers them into the 'real' world, including Scorch, Gorgeous Gilly, the new Bizarro and Ignition, a black-armored villain who first appeared in the "Emperor Joker" story, but was created by someone else.

It has also been implied that Mxyzptlk sees himself as serving an important purpose, in teaching Superman not to take everything too seriously.

In Adventures of Superman #617 (2003), Mxyzptlk is reinvented as fraternal twins with an intense hatred for Superman. Amongst other things, they claim responsibility for the creation of the present-day Persuader. A year later, in Superman Secret Files and Origins 2004 (2004), he returns to his usual self, following a fellow imp in the fifth dimension combining the twins with the classic Mxyzptlk, resulting in his normal form and personality.

Mxyzptlk formed a significant part of Greg Rucka's "Ruin" storyline in Adventures of Superman. His appearance here is similar to his Golden Age look, with the addition of a single lock of hair, resembling Superman's S-shaped forelock. This version of Mxyzptlk is less abrasive than he had been previously, and is portrayed as basically on Superman's side. The metafictional aspects of the character were also played up, as he visits the DC Comics offices in the real world, presented as fumetti.

At the same time, Mxyzptlk appeared in Superman/Batman #23, trying to prepare Batman and Superman for the upcoming Infinite Crisis. The incident features alternate universe versions of Superman, Batman, and Deathstroke and implies much chaos that was not shown, such as the planet Mogo visiting Earth to reclaim an old land mass. At the end of this storyline, Mxyzptlk indicates he has erased the knowledge of Superman's identity from Lex Luthor's mind.

A weakened Mxyzptlk is seemingly killed by Ruin while protecting Superman. Art by Karl Kerschl.

After the fallout of the events of Day of Vengeance (and, while not mentioned, the corruption of the fifth dimension as seen in JSA), the removal of magic from the Earth leaves Mxyzptlk nearly powerless, wandering the streets of Metropolis and unable to remember how to pronounce the inverse of his name to return him home. Superman attempts to help him, but the two are attacked by the villain Ruin. Ruin attempts to assassinate Superman with kryptonite-based weaponry, but Mxyzptlk pushes Superman out of the way, taking a kryptonite spear to the heart and vanishing. Right before he vanishes, he seems to whisper 'kltpzyxm'.

=== Countdown ===
Mister Mxyzptlk makes a one-page appearance in Countdown #31. On a walk in the fifth dimension with Gsptlsnz and his goldfish Superman, he is grabbed by someone or something unknown, who then disappears with Mxy. It is later revealed in Countdown #23, Mxyzptlk was abducted by Superboy-Prime and imprisoned in the Source Wall. Prime has been apparently torturing the imp into helping him bring back his "perfect Earth", i.e. Earth Prime. Mxyzptlk mentions that he has been coming to Earth for centuries, and has been referred to by many names (Loki, Coyote, and Anansi). He is later sent back to his home by Annataz Arataz, the Earth-3 counterpart of Zatanna, whom Prime had also captured. Arriving in the fifth dimension, he proclaims to Gsptlsnz that he has escaped an encounter with "the Beast" (implying that the fifth dimension is aware of Superboy-Prime, who is referred to as a being of pure evil). Knowing that Superboy-Prime will kill every living soul in the fifth dimension to get revenge on him, Mxyzptlk proclaims that their dimension must be sealed off from outsiders and that he can never return to Earth.

=== The New 52 ===
In September 2011, The New 52 rebooted DC's continuity. In this new timeline, Mxyzptlk's history is revealed as a traveling wizard in the fifth dimension who entertained the King-Thing Brpxz of Zrfff. He did so by making 333 different three-dimensional worlds, and by challenging heroes in each world, with everyone being entertained by the one hero who could win the challenges, Superman. This led to Mxyzptlk becoming the king's favorite entertainer, and winning the love of the king's daughter, Gsptlnz. However, it also caused jealousy in the now-deposed original court magician, Vyndktvx. Vyndktvx eventually went mad and tried to kill Mxyzptlk, only to kill the king instead. The instant of the murder of the king, committed with the Multispear - a hyper-weapon - reflected in the three-dimensional universe Superman inhabits as a lifelong struggle with the five-dimensional being. Mxyzptlk and his beloved wife descended to the three-dimensional universe to aid Superman in his struggle; their mortal forms perished in due time, still in the same instant in the time of their home world. There, even as he was defeated in the three-dimensional universe, Vndyktvx was arrested and imprisoned for the murder. Mxyzptlk became king and lived happily with his wife, the beautiful princess-now-queen, only to grieve as she died giving birth to their children. And so, he became the sad king that one day, the jester Mxyzptlk would come to entertain, and who would be slain by Vndyktvx in an eternal cycle.

=== DC Rebirth ===
After the New 52 Superman died and Pre-52 Superman took his place by the time of the DC Rebirth reboot, a mysterious Clark Kent appeared claiming to be the real one. Despite everyone's hesitations and the previous event that outed Clark as Superman, the new Clark had the medical records to match, and when Superman questioned Clark with a telepathic probe, Clark presented a clear history of Clark Kent as a human being who was orphaned at three months old and subsequently adopted by the Kents. Pre-52 Lois investigates the new Clark more after getting her job back at the Daily Planet. Clark asks Lois out on a date which she accepts, but on the date, Lois finds that Clark rented the whole place out for the night and proposed to her, scaring her out of the date. He follows Lois to her secret home and finds out about her marriage to Superman and their son, Jonathan. The next day, after spotting Clark, Superman and Lois's house and Jonathan suddenly disappear. They track Clark down to his apartment, where he reveals himself to be the pre-52 Mister Mxyzptlk, who was absent from the New 52 universe because he was held captive by Mister Oz and used his powers to transform and brainwash himself into believing he was Clark Kent to avoid getting recaptured after escaping. His attacks on Superman are revenge for failing to notice he has been missing and he proceeds to make Lois forget about her own son. As even Lois forgets that Clark and Superman were the same person, Superman agrees to play Mxyzptlk's game to try and win back the 'right' to see his son again, but although Mister Mxyzptlk attempts to change the rules and ensure his victory, Jonathan is able to fight through his prison with the aid of unspecified spirits that are revealed to be the New 52 versions of Superman and Lois, culminating in the creation of a new timeline where the essence of the post-Flashpoint Lois and Clark are fused with their pre-Flashpoint selves, so that the history of both worlds can co-exist.

== Powers and abilities ==
Mister Mxyzptlk possesses the ability to warp reality, which has been described alternatively as the product of fifth dimensional magic or their technology, which is so advanced that, to third dimensional beings, it looks like magic. He is virtually immortal and omnipotent. Attendant with his abilities is the fact that Mxyzptlk himself is not limited by physical laws: he needs no sustenance such as air or water, can exist in any environment, can teleport anywhere, and is not susceptible to physical harm. His only apparent vulnerability is that whenever he speaks his name backwards, he is shunted back to the fifth dimension, and all effects of his magic vanish. This also has occurred with an indirect application of that rule; on one occasion, Mxyzptlk was banished by a backward-played tape recording of his own voice saying his name.

However, such a banishment is a temporary deterrent. After 90 days, Mxyzptlk can again visit the third dimension at will. His reality-warping powers exist in the fifth dimension, but he exerts less control compared to the third dimension, due to the presence of other imps with the same powers.

The scope of Mxyzptlk's true potential is limited by his personality. His gullible nature makes it easy for Superman or other individuals to deceive him into uttering his name backwards, and overall, he is a prankster who prefers to use his power for juvenile mischief and light-hearted harassment rather than outright malicious destruction or torment.

The only exception to this aspect of his personality is the aforementioned interpretation by Alan Moore in Whatever Happened to the Man of Tomorrow?, where Mr Mxyzptlk shows the darker side of his omnipotence: his reality-manipulating powers go as far as to make him act as a puppeteer manoeuvring powerful characters such as Bizarro, Brainiac, Lex Luthor and the Legion of Super-Villains.

== Other versions ==
- An alternate universe version of Mxyzptlk appears in Superman and Batman: World's Funnest.
- Mixyezpitellik, Mxyzptlk's antimatter universe counterpart, appears in The Brave and the Bold #11.
- An alternate universe version of Mxyzptlk appears in Supergirl: Cosmic Adventures in the Eighth Grade. This version orchestrated Supergirl's arrival in Metropolis, disguising himself as a teacher at her school and intending to use her emotions to power a machine that would give him unlimited energy. However, he is defeated by her and banished to a two-dimensional prison by his henchmen.
- An alternate universe version of Mxyzptlk appears in Superman & Batman: Generations.

== In other media ==
=== Television ===
==== Animation ====
Mister Mxyzptlk as he appears in Superman: The Animated Series.

- Mister Mxyzptlk appears in The New Adventures of Superman episode "The Imp-Practical Joker", voiced by Gilbert Mack. This version's name uses the official DC Comics pronunciation.
- Mister Mxyzptlk appears in the Super Friends franchise, voiced by Frank Welker. This version's name is pronounced "miks-ill-plik" forwards and "kilp-ill-skim" backwards. Additionally, he enjoys tormenting all of the Super Friends even when Superman is absent.
- Mister Mxyzptlk appears in series set in the DC Animated Universe (DCAU):
  - An animatronic toy based on the Bronze Age incarnation of Mxyzptlk makes a cameo appearance in the Batman: The Animated Series episode "Deep Freeze".
  - Mxyzptlk appears in Superman: The Animated Series, voiced by Gilbert Gottfried. This version's design is based on the Golden Age incarnation and claims to have inspired Earth's legends of imps, genies, and leprechauns. Additionally, his name is pronounced "MIX-yes-SPIT-lick" forwards and "kill-TIPP-ZEE-zimm" backwards.
  - According to the commentary for the Superman: The Animated Series episode "Mxyzpixilated", Mxyzptlk was intended to star in a Justice League episode, but screenwriter Paul Dini and series developer Bruce Timm were unable to create a suitable story for him to appear in. Despite this, a cardboard cutout of Mxyzptlk appears in the episode "Secret Society".
- Mister Mxyzptlk appears in the Robot Chicken episode "The Departy Monster", voiced by Seth Green.
- Mister Mxyzptlk appears in the Batman: The Brave and the Bold episode "Battle of the Superheroes!", voiced by Kevin Michael Richardson. This version's name is pronounced "mix-ee-yez-pit-lik".
- Mister Mxyzptlk appears in Justice League Action, voiced again by Gilbert Gottfried. This version's name is pronounced "kl-tp-zyx-m" backwards.
- Mister Mxyzptlk makes a non-speaking cameo appearance in the Harley Quinn episode "So You Need a Crew?".
- Mister Mxyzptlk appears in My Adventures with Superman, voiced by David Errigo Jr. This version is a multiversal imp, self-proclaimed chaos god, and criminal with a more youthful and inhuman appearance, taking cues from impish anime characters. Additionally, he is an enemy of the League of Lois Lanes, a multiversal alliance of Lois Lanes who previously confiscated his hat and partially depowered him. In the third season, he transports Superman, Lois, Jimmy, and Supergirl to his realm where he and his wife Gsptlsnz trick them into unlocking a cosmic anvil, by staging a divorce between them.

==== Live-action ====
Trent Ford (right) as Mikhail Mxyzptlk with Chloe Sullivan (Allison Mack) in the Smallville episode "Jinx".

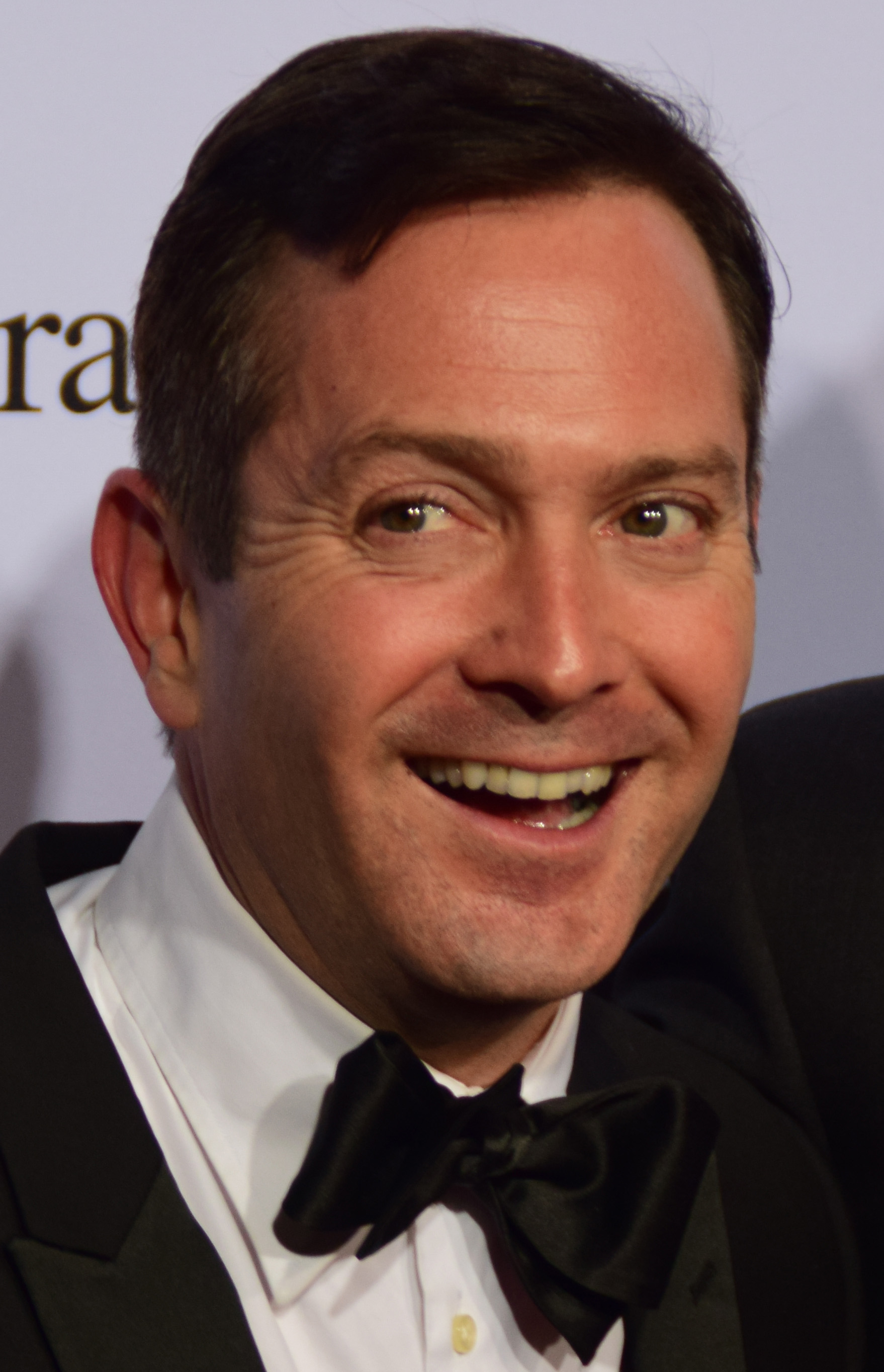
Thomas Lennon portrayed Mr. Mxyzptlk in Supergirl's 100th episode.

- Mister Mxyzptlk appears in Superboy, portrayed by Michael J. Pollard.
- Mister Mxyzptlk appears in the Lois & Clark: The New Adventures of Superman episode "Twas the Night Before Mxymas", portrayed by Howie Mandel. This version's name is pronounced "mix-yez-pit-leck" and is said to have inspired legends of imps, genies and leprechauns as well as real historic events such as the fall of Rome. Additionally, he is more malevolent than other incarnations.
- A character inspired by Mister Mxyzptlk named Mikhail Mxyzptlk appears in the Smallville episode "Jinx", portrayed by Trent Ford. This version's name is pronounced "mix-ill-pit-ill-lick" and is a metahuman with the ability to manipulate targets via verbal commands and an ultrasonic frequency. Additionally, he is descended from a line of people from the "Kltpzyxm" family, who were said to control luck, but were forced to leave the Balkans and change their name.
- Mister Mxyzptlk appears in Supergirl, portrayed by Peter Gadiot in the second season and by Thomas Lennon in the fifth and sixth seasons. This version's name is pronounced "miss-is-pit-lick" and is an old friend of the Hat, who derives his power from his own.

=== Film ===
- Mister Mxyzptlk was considered to appear in Superman III, as written in an outline by Ilya Salkind, but the idea was scrapped. The Mxyzptlk portrayed in the outline varies from his good-humored comic counterpart, as he uses his abilities to do serious harm. Additionally, Dudley Moore was the top choice to play the role.
- Mister Mxyzptlk makes a cameo appearance in Teen Titans Go! vs. Teen Titans as a prisoner of Trigon.

=== Video games ===
- Mister Mxyzptlk appears in Superman Returns, voiced by Dwight Schultz.
- Mister Mxyzptlk appears in DC Universe Online, voiced by Shanon Weaver.
- Mister Mxyzptlk appears in Scribblenauts Unmasked: A DC Comics Adventure.
- Mister Mxyzptlk appears in Lego Batman 3: Beyond Gotham, voiced again by Gilbert Gottfried.
- Mister Mxyzptlk appears in Lego DC Super-Villains, voiced again by Gilbert Gottfried.
- Mister Mxyzptlk appears in Justice League: Cosmic Chaos, voiced by Dana Snyder. Gottfried was intended to reprise the role before his death, after which Snyder replaced him.

=== Miscellaneous ===
- Mister Mxyzptlk appears in Superman & Bugs Bunny.
- Mister Mxyzptlk is referenced in Blaine L. Reininger's song "A Café au Lait for Mr. Mxyzptlk".
- Mister Mxyzptlk appears in the Injustice: Gods Among Us prequel comic. Taking advantage of Jim Corrigan being incarcerated in Arkham Asylum, he usurps him as the Spectre, assumes his form, and joins Superman's Regime, claiming that he wants to bring order to the world. While fighting Trigon, Mxyzptlk's ruse and his personality having been corrupted is revealed. With Mxyzptlk's fight against Trigon tearing reality apart, Doctor Fate sacrifices himself to bring himself and the combatants into the Void.

== Reception ==
In 2009, Mister Mxyzptlk was ranked as IGN's 76th Greatest Comic Book Villain of All Time.

== Cultural references ==
- A character based on Mxyzptlk called Szasz, the Sprite Supreme of the 19th dimension, appears in Alan Moore's Supreme.
- An analogue of Mxyzptlk named Pxyzsyzygy appears in the novel Super-Folks by Robert Mayer.
- Brooklyn-based band Mixel Pixel credits Mxyzptlk as the source of their name.
- The third movement of American composer Michael Daugherty's Metropolis Symphony is a musical portrait of Mister Mxyzptlk.
- In Family Guy, Mayor Adam West was a contestant on Jeopardy!. During "Final Jeopardy!", he writes the host Alex Trebek's name backwards, "Kebert Xela", as his answer, causing Trebek to disappear to the fifth dimension like Mxyzptlk.
- In The Big Bang Theory episode "The Spoiler Alert Segmentation", Sheldon Cooper picks up a Mister Mxyzptlk action figure belonging to Leonard Hofstadter while clearing out his belongings.
- Mister Ogg of the 1987 Teenage Mutant Ninja Turtles series is based on Mister Mxyzptlk.
- In a 1997 comic The Imp and I, Mickey Mouse confronts the titular Imp from the 11th Dimension. The magical troublemaker can only be banished from Mickey's world by tricking the Imp to spell a charm used by it backwards.
- A parody of Mxyzptlk called Mr. Skibumpers appears in the SuperMansion special "War on Christmas", with his weakness being that if he removes his hat, he will turn into a wooden doll.
- A gender neutral version of Mxyzptlk appears in The People's Joker, a 2022 superhero parody film, as Mx. Mxyzptlk.

== Pronunciation ==
Due to the phonetic difficulties in pronouncing a name spelled without vowels such as Mxyzptlk, it has been pronounced in various ways by various sources over the past four decades. On the 1967 Filmation CBS Superman animated series, it was pronounced as Mix-yez-PITTLE-ik; sources indicate that was the official DC Comics version of the time, furnished to the show's writers through DC Comics editor/writer E. Nelson Bridwell. During the 1980s, on the Super Friends cartoon, produced by Hanna-Barbera, it was approximated as Mix-ill-plick. Mikael is actually a general translation and other variations have included Mix-yez-PIT-lek, Mix-yez-PIT-ul-ick, and Mix-yez-pittle-ik. To further complicate matters, Mxyzptlk says himself in the 1990s animated series of Superman, that his name is pronounced the same as saying the words "mix, yes, spit, lick", even transforming himself into the appropriate illustrations for the words. Clark had pronounced his name as Mix-ill-plick before Mxyzptlk popped out of the comic and proceeded to correct him. In his appearance in the Superman Returns video game, Mxyzptlk proudly refers to himself as "the one and only Mr. Mix-yiz-SPIT-Lik!, straight from the fifth dimension!" Miks-il-piti-lik (with the i's pronounced only lightly) was used on Smallville, all while the original spelling of his name was pronounced mix-pit-tulk. This has created great confusion and even debate as to how his name is actually to be spoken.

In Action Comics Annual #10 (2007), "Superman's Top 10 Most Wanted" describes Mister Mxyzptlk and provides the pronunciation as Mix-yez-pittle-ik, exactly like the 1967 animated series. So, phonetically, the pronunciation backwards would be "Kell-tipp-ZEY-skim". Confusingly, the 1967 animated series used the backwards pronunciation "Kulp-ti-mix-im". It is fair to say that producers were free to interpret the name any way they wanted, just as they routinely changed other elements of comic lore to suit their various series.

== See also ==
- Bat-Mite
- Joe Btfsplk
- List of Superman enemies
- Rumpelstiltskin
- Q
- Trickster god
