= Jimmy Olsen =

DC comic book universe character

- Artwork of Jimmy Olsen by Phil Noto from 9-11: The World's Finest Comic Book Writers and Artists Tell Stories to Remember

Publication information
- Publisher: DC Comics
- First appearance: Anonymous cameo: Action Comics #6 (November 1938); As Jimmy Olsen: Radio: The Adventures of Superman radio serial (April 15, 1940); Comics: Superman #13 (November–December 1941)
- Created by: Jerry Siegel; Joe Shuster; Bob Maxwell

In-story information
- Full name: James Bartholomew "Jimmy" Olsen
- Species: Human
- Team affiliations: Daily Planet
- Partnerships: Clark Kent / Superman; Lois Lane; Supergirl
- Notable aliases: Mr. Action; Elastic Lad; Flamebird; Accountable

Altered in-story information for adaptations to other media
- Partnerships: Kara Danvers

James Bartholomew Olsen, also known as Jimmy Olsen, is a fictional character appearing in American comic books published by DC Comics. Olsen is most often portrayed as a young photojournalist working for the Daily Planet. He is close friends with Lois Lane and Clark Kent / Superman, and has a good working relationship with his boss Perry White. Olsen looks up to his coworkers as role models and parent figures. From 1954 to 1982, Olsen appeared in 222 issues of the comic series Superman's Pal Jimmy Olsen and The Superman Family, in addition to the main Superman titles.

The character has appeared in most other media adaptations of Superman. He was portrayed by Tommy Bond in the two Superman film serials, Superman (1948) and Atom Man vs. Superman (1950); Jack Larson in Adventures of Superman; Marc McClure in the Superman films of the 1970s and 1980s, as well as the 1984 film Supergirl; Michael Landes in the first season of Lois and Clark: The New Adventures of Superman and Justin Whalin in the subsequent three seasons; Sam Huntington in the 2006 film Superman Returns; Aaron Ashmore in The CW's Smallville; and Michael Cassidy in the 2016 DC Extended Universe film Batman v Superman: Dawn of Justice. In the Arrowverse series Supergirl, he was portrayed by Mehcad Brooks. Douglas Smith portrayed the character in Superman & Lois. The character appears in the DC Universe franchise portrayed by Skyler Gisondo in the film Superman (2025) and will return in Man of Tomorrow, and the television series The People v. Gorilla Grodd (both 2027). The character has also appeared in numerous television animated series, including Superman: The Animated Series (1996–2000), voiced by David Kaufman and My Adventures with Superman (2023–present), voiced by Ishmel Sahid.

== Publication history ==
=== Creation and early appearances ===
The "office boy's" debut, on the panels of the pages of Action Comics #6 (November 1938), art by Joe Shuster

An unnamed "office boy" with a bow tie appeared in the story "Superman's Phony Manager," published in Action Comics No. 6 (November 1938); it was retroactively considered to be Jimmy Olsen's first appearance, though some argue that the "office boy" is a different character with no link to Olsen. The character was introduced as Jimmy Olsen by producer Bob Maxwell on The Adventures of Superman radio show on April 15, 1940. After eight early unnamed appearances in comics, Olsen first appeared as a named character in a story by Jerry Siegel and Joe Shuster titled "Superman versus The Archer" in Superman No. 13 (November–December 1941). He occasionally appeared as an office boy in Action Comics, Superman, and World's Finest Comics throughout the next decade, and he made a notable appearance as the manager of a community baseball team in the 1946 radio serial Clan of the Fiery Cross. The first long story featuring the character, "King Jimmy Olsen," ran in the daily Superman newspaper strips from July 20-October 28, 1944. However, for the most part Jimmy Olsen was used only as a background character throughout the 1940s and early 1950s.

=== Superman's Pal Jimmy Olsen ===
Superman and Jimmy Olsen as they appeared on the cover of Superman's Pal, Jimmy Olsen #140 (September 1971), art by Curt Swan and Murphy Anderson

Jack Larson's portrayal on the 1952 Adventures of Superman TV series made Jimmy Olsen into a character beloved by the public, and Olsen was promoted from office boy to "cub reporter" beginning in the 1953 comic Superman #86. Olsen's popularity in the TV format prompted DC Comics to give him his own series, Superman's Pal Jimmy Olsen, in 1954. The first issue introduced the Signal Watch, a high-frequency supersonic device that allowed Jimmy to contact Superman in case of emergency.Lois Lane's sister, Lucy Lane, debuted as Jimmy's off-again, on-again love interest in issue #36. Jimmy and Lucy were occasionally married in "imaginary stories" such as "The Wedding of Jimmy Olsen" (issue #38) and The Amazing Story of Superman Red and Superman Blue!. In another imaginary story, seen in issue #57, Jimmy marries Superman's cousin, Supergirl (Kara Zor-El/Linda Lee Danvers) after she lost both her powers and her memories, until she regains them after her marriage; once she reveals to him that she is Supergirl, he is completely happy about it.

==== The Mort Weisinger era ====
Though early adventures were relatively mundane, from issue #22 onward Superman's Pal Jimmy Olsen saw Olsen in a variety of slapstick adventures and strange transformations, such as Jimmy transforming into the giant "Turtle Boy" in issue #53. The stories in the title often featured particularly outlandish situations, ranging from Jimmy being hurled back in time to Krypton before its destruction in issue #36 to dealing frequently with gorillas of all sorts. During this period, Jimmy Olsen lived a glamorous life as "Superman's Pal" and even had his own (in-story) fan club. Beginning in 1958, Olsen gained the ability to temporarily transform into the superhero Elastic Lad by drinking a serum, becoming an honorary member of the Legion of Super-Heroes. When traveling to the Bottle City of Kandor, Superman and Jimmy donned the secret identities of Nightwing and Flamebird respectively. He was promoted by editor Perry White to the status of "full-fledged reporter" in issue #124 (October 1969).

Superman's Pal Jimmy Olsen was a best seller throughout the 1960s; at its peak it was the #4 best-selling comic book with an estimated 520,000 copies sold each month. Reprints from the magazine were also featured in 80-Page Giant #2 and 13 (1964–65).

==== Jack Kirby's Fourth World ====
Jack Kirby's Fourth World storyline began in Jimmy Olsen comics in 1970, with issue #134. Kirby began by introducing a secret "D.N.A. Project" to create Mutated Humans for Good, adding "the Hairies" (a group of technology-equipped hippies), superbeings from other planets (proto-New Gods), Intergang, Darkseid, and the WGBS media executive Morgan Edge. Kirby also used the series as a vehicle to reintroduce Golden Age characters that he previously created at DC Comics, such as the Guardian and the Newsboy Legion. Before the end of his run, Kirby wrote stories involving vampires, the Loch Ness Monster, Victor Volcanum, a fire-eating archcriminal, as well as a two-part story that featured the comedian Don Rickles. Kirby left the series following issue #148.

=== The Superman Family ===
With issue #164 (April–May 1974) the series was renamed The Superman Family. An anthology title that incorporated the recently cancelled series Supergirl and Superman's Girl Friend, Lois Lane, Superman Family initially featured one new story about Jimmy Olsen, Lois Lane, or Supergirl, with the featured character in each issue narrating reprints of the other characters' stories. By the second series, Jimmy Olsen became an investigative reporter for WGBS-TV nicknamed "Mr. Action", featuring in urban crime stories that less frequently involved Superman. Olsen appeared in new stories in The Superman Family #164, 167, 170, 173, 176, 179, and 182–222. A number of Superman writers including Leo Dorfman and Cary Bates contributed scripts for the stories, and they were most often pencilled by Kurt Schaffenberger. The series ended with issue #222 (September 1982). Afterwards, Jimmy Olsen continued to appear in issues of Superman, Action Comics, World's Finest Comics, and DC Comics Presents, where a 29th-century descendant of Olsen became Superwoman.

=== Post-Crisis ===
Following Crisis on Infinite Earths, Jimmy's prior history as a character was erased. Despite recent modernization efforts on Superman and his supporting characters, Jimmy Olsen has not been significantly changed in the Modern Age. He is still a cub reporter working for The Daily Planet, and is still friends with Superman. His look was made over as he stopped wearing bowties, and started wearing casual clothing (though this trend started in the 1970s comics). An alteration to the relationship was that Jimmy designed the signal watch himself, leading to his first meeting with Superman. Superman briefly considers confiscating the watch, but decides to trust Jimmy to use it responsibly.

While Jimmy's transformations no longer occur as regularly as they did in the Silver Age, in one story Jimmy becomes a type of "Elastic Lad" on contact with the Eradicator; this transformation, however, is extremely painful for Jimmy and has not appeared since. He also took the identity of "Turtle Boy" in a series of pizza commercials, made when he was temporarily laid off from the Planet.

In the 1990s stories, Jimmy quits the Planet in a dispute over a story and goes to Metropolis broadcaster Galaxy Broadcasting, where he works as an on-air investigative reporter. This change matures Jimmy somewhat, but he becomes more ambitious, as well as more brash and arrogant. He stays on good terms with both Clark and Lois to the point where Jimmy is best man at their wedding. This period ends when he believes (wrongly) that he has discovered Superman's secret identity and says he would announce it live on air. He reconsiders his actions, but loses his job for wasting the time slot. He is again rehired by the Planet.

Jimmy later comes under the angry hand of the Alpha Centurion, an alternate universe dictator with a deep-seated hatred for Superman and eyes for Lois Lane. Jimmy uncovers his secret plot to control the world's finances through his company Aelius Industries, Inc.

==== Superman: Metropolis ====
Olsen is a central character in the 12-part miniseries Superman: Metropolis (beginning June 2003). Written by Chuck Austen and illustrated by Danijel Zezelj, the series focuses on the futuristic technology unleashed in Metropolis by Brainiac in a previous storyline and how it affects the everyday lives of Metropolis citizens.

Jimmy takes a position as a regular star reporter for The Daily Planet, replacing the recently demoted Clark Kent. This causes a strain at the Planet.

==== Countdown to Final Crisis ====
Jimmy Olsen as Mr. Action, cover art for Countdown #38 (October 2007) by Shane Davis and Matt Banning

Jimmy's story in the 2007–08 weekly series Countdown to Final Crisis begins with an investigation into the death of Duela Dent. Tying into the Death of the New Gods storyline, Jimmy starts to develop many superpowers, which he first discovers when he is attacked by Killer Croc while gathering information on Duela's death. As the story progresses he tries to uncover the origin of these powers and starts to discover their potential limitlessness in stories which mimic the Silver Age Superman's Pal Jimmy Olsen adventures. Briefly operating as the superhero Mr. Action, Jimmy is unable to command the respect of established superheroes in the Justice League and Teen Titans. He gives up on this particular avenue. One of these powers allows Jimmy to realize the identities of some superheroes, such as Robin and Superman, who requests that he take care of Krypto.

Jimmy is eventually tracked down by the New God Forager, with whom he begins a romantic relationship. Forager informs him that Jimmy has become a soulcatcher for the spirits of dying New Gods. The Monitor known as Solomon later tells him that his new powers are the consequence of Darkseid using Jimmy as a host for powers he wishes to use to recreate the universe in his image, knowing that "Superman's pal" is one of the world's most well-protected citizens. Later, as the events of Countdown begin to come to their close, Jimmy becomes a more confidently powerful character and is reunited with the series' other cast members on a mission to stop Karate Kid's disease from becoming a pandemic of apocalyptic proportions. Unfortunately, they fail, and the Morticoccus virus devastates an alternate Earth. Upon return to their Earth, Jimmy is captured by Mary Marvel, who had been manipulated towards evil by Darkseid. When Superman comes to save Jimmy, Darkseid takes control of the powers within him, causing Jimmy to radiate Kryptonite radiation, until Ray Palmer manages to rewire Darkseid's control from inside of Jimmy. Jimmy then transforms into a giant turtle-like creature, and prepares to take on Darkseid himself. Darkseid overcomes Jimmy, and prepares to kill him. Ray Palmer comes out of Jimmy with the New God soul battery and destroys it, returning Jimmy to normal.

==== Superman's Pal, Jimmy Olsen Special ====
During Superman's fight with Atlas, Jimmy witnesses a mysterious figure hovering over the fight. After some encouraging words from Clark Kent, he decides to take two weeks off to investigate.

He tracks down a figure connected with the past of Jonathan Drew and is told the story of how Jonathan became Codename: Assassin. His informant is quickly executed by Codename: Assassin, who then tries to kill Jimmy. Jimmy is able to avoid being killed and is apparently shielded from Codename: Assassin's telepathy due to his own many physical transformations over the years.

Jimmy goes to Project Cadmus and speaks to Dubbilex, who tells him the story about the death of the original Guardian at the hands of Codename: Assassin and how cloning is such an imperfect science that the only viable clone alive went into hiding in the desert. Dubbilex then dies from injuries sustained in an earlier conflict with Codename: Assassin. Jimmy heads south to the town of Warpath, Arizona, managing to avoid conflict with Codename: Assassin on the way.

Upon arriving in Warpath, Jimmy interviews the sheriff, Greg Saunders, who evades his questions. Jimmy follows him after dark and sees Saunders working with the last Guardian clone. He then confronts the clone at his home and the two speak.

With his two weeks up, Jimmy returns to Metropolis horrified from learning that a faction within the U.S. military is actively plotting to kill Superman.

Willing to do anything to uncover the conspiracy behind Project 7734, Jimmy uses an anonymous chat server and contacts Erik/Amazing Woman from Infinity, Inc., who claims to have information useful to Jimmy. Despite being actively pursued by Codename: Assassin, who goes so far as to place bugs in his house, Jimmy goes to the appointment, only to find Erik's house burned to the ground.

Jimmy pulls Erik out who, with his dying breath, shifts to his more reliable and powerful Erika form. Erik gives him Natasha Irons' number. Natasha then contacts Jimmy, telling him about the plans of General Sam Lane, his outworldly fortress and his capture, and use of a Planet Breaker weapon of Captain Atom, now codenamed Project Breach (due to his similarity to Tim Zanetti's fate).

Finally ready to uncover the truth, Jimmy is openly confronted by Codename: Assassin, who until that point had merely followed him closely. Jimmy uses his signal watch to call Mon-El. Jimmy is shot twice in the chest by Codename: Assassin and sinks into the ocean. Despite surviving his assassination attempt, Jimmy decides to fake his death, having his documents planted on a heavily disfigured corpse. With no one knowing about his survival, Jimmy moves into the old Pemberton Camera Factory, sharing the results of his now-unhindered investigations with Perry and Mon-El.

=== Superman's Pal Jimmy Olsen (vol. 2) ===
Beginning with a cover date of September 2019, DC Comics published a 12-part comedic miniseries that restored some elements of the 1954 series to the main DC Comics timeline. Jimmy was once again shown as Turtle Boy and Elastic Lad, and his antics, glamorous lifestyle as Superman's pal, and strange transformations were depicted as a source of streaming-media ad revenue that was keeping the Daily Planet afloat. The series explored Jimmy's siblings Janie and Julian, his family's historic relations with Lex Luthor's family, a plot involving the attempted murder and faked death of Olsen, and a marriage in Gorilla City that Jimmy subsequently forgot to annul. The series poked fun at DC Comics' own history, including a sequence in which Jimmy angered Batman by suggesting a phone-in campaign to decide whether Robin lived or died. By the end of the series, Jimmy received a new Signal Watch and became the publisher of the Daily Planet.

The series was written by Matt Fraction, drawn by Steve Lieber, colored by Nathan Fairbairn, and lettered by Clayton Cowles. A collected edition titled Superman's Pal Jimmy Olsen: Who Killed Jimmy Olsen? was published in September 2020, and it received an "honorable mention" in Publishers Weekly's year-end critics poll.

== Powers, abilities, and equipment ==
Cover art for Superman: The Amazing Transformations of Jimmy Olsen by Brian Bolland

Jimmy possesses a watch which emits a high-pitched signal only Superman can hear. In a 2010 story, he claimed it stopped working some time in the past, never worked particularly well in the first place, and that he contacted Superman through Morse code now, anyway, but still wore it for show.

Mostly during the Silver Age of Comic Books, Jimmy would find himself temporarily transformed, for better or worse, or undergo a disguise for various purposes. The variety of transformations Jimmy received during the Silver Age is often homaged or parodied in later comics and adaptations featuring the character – for instance, in JLA: The Nail, Jimmy cites three of these transformations as his motivations behind backing Luthor's bill to outlaw metahumans and in Countdown, Jimmy is used as a spirit container for the deceased New Gods, causing him to exhibit strange powers, albeit uncontrollably, with other stories simply making passing references.

- Speed Demon – In a 1956 story, Jimmy drank a potion produced by Professor Claude in order to gain super-speed.
- Radioactive – After being exposed to a radioactive substance, Jimmy began to irradiate everything in his presence.
- Super-Brain – Jimmy evolved into a "man of the future" with superhuman mental powers.
- Monstrous beard growth — The machinations of the Beard Band cause Jimmy to grow an immense beard.
- Gorilla – When Jimmy switched minds with a gorilla, he went about his reporting duties as a gorilla in Jimmy's clothes.
- Elastic Lad – As Elastic Lad, Jimmy by serum or by alien virus could sometimes stretch himself, akin to the Elongated Man or Plastic Man. As Elastic Lad, Jimmy was inducted as an honorary member of the Legion of Super-Heroes. In the Post-Crisis on Infinite Earths continuity, Jimmy was afflicted with uncontrollable and painful elasticity by the Eradicator.
- Alien-form – Aliens transformed Jimmy into a telepathic Jovian for a week. This turned out to be a Jovian week, which is much shorter than an Earth week, about 70 hours.
- Fire-Breather – An accident involving an experiment gives Jimmy fire-breath.
- Human Octopus – After eating an extraterrestrial fruit, Jimmy grows four extra arms. According to Superman, this is actually a hallucination, but Jimmy suspects that Superman said this to teach him a lesson since Jimmy had foolishly ignored advice from Superman that would have saved him a lot of trouble.
- Genie – Jimmy finds a genie's lamp and is tricked into replacing its villainous occupant.
- Wolf-Man – In the vein of the 1957 film I Was a Teenage Werewolf, Jimmy is transformed into a werewolf.
- Woman – Jimmy goes undercover dressed as a woman in No. 44, No. 67, No. 84, and No. 159. Grant Morrison paid a brief homage to this in the JLA: Earth 2 graphic novel and in All-Star Superman.
- Morbidly Obese – Jimmy gets fat in an attempt to stop a jewel smuggling and to impress a circus fat lady.
- Giant Turtle Man – One of Jimmy's most frequently cited transformations is his turning into a giant turtle man.
- Human Porcupine – Jimmy transforms after rejecting the romantic advances of an imp from the Fifth Dimension.
- Flamebird – This is the name he took as a red and yellow costumed superhero, with Superman disguised as the original Nightwing, in the shrunken Kryptonian city of Kandor. These names were inspired by two native Kryptonian birds, the nightwing and the flamebird, but the relationship between Nightwing and Flamebird intentionally paralleled the crime-fighting team Batman (a night-winged creature) and Robin (a flame-colored bird).
- Bizarro Jimmy – Although Jimmy has a counterpart on Bizarro World, he is turned into a Bizarro himself.
- Hippie – Investigating a colony of hippies at "Guru Kama's Dream Pad", Jimmy grows a beard and participates in a mock "hate-in". On the cover of this story's issue, Jimmy is wielding a sign that says "Superman is a freak-out!"
- Viking – Jimmy puts on Viking armor and mistakenly thinks he has been transported 1,000 years backward in time.
- Steel-Man – After Mount Tipton explodes and hurls Jimmy and an experimental inter-dimensional travel device into an alternate universe, Jimmy develops his own Kryptonian-style superpowers as a result of the transit to "Earth-X" but is vulnerable to radioactive fragments of "Tiptonite" from his own universe as well as, ironically, to krypton gas. He adopts a fusion Superman/Batman outfit and launches his own superhero career as Steel-Man, facing an evil Clark Kent, secretly the Joker-masked leader of LUTHAR (the League Using Terror, Havoc And Robbery), before returning to his own universe.
- Ultra Olsen – Jimmy gains from Professor Lang and his father two halves of the Magic Medallion of the Mayans that, when fused back together, grant him "the Powers of the Mayan Gods". While he wears it, he possesses super strength, invulnerability, anti-gravity power, and lightning vision. The amulet has a limited charge and requires recharge from absorbed kinetic energy. Jimmy destroys the amulet with his lightning vision after the second time he used it.

== Other versions ==
Jimmy Olsen in The Nail, art by Alan Davis

=== JLA: The Nail ===
JLA: The Nail is set in an alternate reality in which a nail punctures a tire on the Kents' car, preventing them from finding the spaceship containing a baby Kal-El; subsequently, Kal-El never becomes Superman. Jimmy Olsen, an aide to Metropolis mayor Lex Luthor, is revealed to be the primary villain. Having discovered Superman's spaceship and using DNA samples to create numerous Bizarro clones, Luthor grafts Kryptonian DNA onto subjects, which inevitably causes them to die. Olsen survives the graft, but is driven insane, mentally transforming him into a Kryptonian determined to replace human life with Kryptonian life. Olsen plays up the public's fear of superheroes via propaganda, encouraging the popular view of them as alien invaders rather than the enhanced humans of the Justice Society, hoping to have them imprisoned so he can use their DNA as well in an attempt to create a stable template to create other new Kryptonians.

When his identity is revealed, Olsen engages in a fight with the Justice League that spills into the local countryside. An Amish farmer attempts to stop Olsen but is blasted by his heat vision—which reveals that the farmer is an adult Kal-El. An Amish couple had raised Kal-El as a pacifist encouraged to ignore worldly affairs so that he could walk in righteousness. Olsen asks Kal-El to join him, claiming that they are virtually brothers with the same DNA. When Kal-El refuses, Olsen kills Kal-El's foster parents. During the subsequent battle, Olsen's body rejects the Kryptonian DNA, causing him to disintegrate.

=== Frank Miller's Batman titles ===
An alternate universe version of Jimmy Olsen appears in The Dark Knight Returns and The Dark Knight Strikes Again.

An alternate universe version of Jimmy Olsen who became a reporter for the Gotham Gazette appears in All Star Batman & Robin, the Boy Wonder #6.

=== Superman: Red Son ===
An alternate universe version of Jimmy Olsen from Earth-30 appears in Superman: Red Son. This version is a CIA agent who later becomes Vice President of the United States under Lex Luthor.

=== Superman: Kal ===
An alternate universe version of Jimmy Olsen from Earth-395 appears in Superman: Kal. This version is Jamie Ollson, an alchemist and teacher to Merlin.

=== Superman: Emperor Joker ===
An alternate universe version of Jimmy Olsen who serves the Joker appears in the Emperor Joker storyline.

=== All-Star Superman ===
An alternate universe version of Jimmy Olsen appears in All-Star Superman.

=== Flashpoint ===
An alternate timeline version of Jimmy Olsen appears in Flashpoint. This version is a secret agent working for Cyborg before he is killed in action and replaced by Lois Lane.

=== Earth 2 ===
An alternate universe version of Jimmy Olsen from Earth-2 appears in Earth 2. This version is a hacktivist who later fuses with a Mother Box, becoming a New God with intangibility and technopathy.

=== Absolute Universe ===
An alternate universe version of Jimmy Olsen appears in Absolute Superman. This version is a member of an anti-corporate terrorist group called the Omega Men before discovering their leader Omega Prime is Talia al Ghul. Following this, he joins Superman and former Lazarus agent Lois Lane in defending Smallville from Lazarus's forces.

== In other media ==
=== Television ===
==== Live-action ====
Michael Landes (left) and Justin Whalin (right) as Jimmy Olsen in Lois & Clark: The New Adventures of Superman

- Jimmy Olsen appears in Adventures of Superman, portrayed by Jack Larson.
- Jimmy Olsen appears in Lois & Clark: The New Adventures of Superman, portrayed by Michael Landes in the first season and Justin Whalin for the rest of the series' run due to Landes heavily resembling Superman actor Dean Cain and to emphasize Jimmy's youth. Landes played Olsen as a cocksure, sarcastic Generation X character who often seemed like he was very sure of himself despite the opposite being true. Whalin gave a portrayal closer to previous incarnations of the character, playing Jimmy as a lovably naïve rookie and a computer whiz. Additionally, Jack Larson plays an aged Olsen in the episode "Brutal Youth" while Jimmy's father Jack Olsen, a secret agent for the fictional National Intelligence Agency (N.I.A.) appears in the episode "The Dad who Came in from the Cold".
- Two characters named Jimmy Olsen appear in Smallville:
  - The first version seen is Henry James "Jimmy" Olsen (portrayed by Aaron Ashmore) in a relationship with series original character Chloe Sullivan before he is ultimately killed by Doomsday.
  - The second version seen is Jimmy's younger brother named James Bartholomew "Jimmy" Olsen (portrayed by Ryan Harder as a teenager in "Doomsday" and by Ashmore as an adult in "Finale" Pt. 2). He was seen attending his older brother's funeral. By "Finale" Pt. 2, an older James Olsen goes to work for the Daily Bugle by the year 2018.
- James "Jimmy" Olsen appears in TV series set in the Arrowverse, portrayed by Mehcad Brooks. Introduced in Supergirl (2016), this version is African-American and a former Daily Planet photographer who joins CatCo in National City as an art director in the pilot episode. Additionally, he is aware of Superman and Supergirl's secret identities and lost his father to criminals when he was a child, leading him to become the vigilante Guardian. Later in the series, Olsen becomes head of CatCo after Cat Grant moves to Metropolis before quitting after Andrea Rojas buys the company and forces him to report on stories based on profitability instead of the truth. Following this, he becomes the editor of his hometown paper, The Calvintown Gazette.
- Jimmy Olsen appears in the Superman & Lois episode "A Regular Guy", portrayed by Douglas Smith. This version is the brother of Janet Olsen.

==== Animation ====
Jimmy Olsen as depicted in the DC Animated Universe

- Jimmy Olsen appears in The New Adventures of Superman, voiced by Jack Grimes.
- Jimmy Olsen appears in Superman (1988), voiced by Mark L. Taylor.
- Jimmy Olsen appears in series set in the DC Animated Universe (DCAU), voiced by David Kaufman:
  - Introduced in Superman: The Animated Series, this version is a copy boy and reporter at the Daily Planet who idolizes Clark Kent and Lois Lane. In his most notable appearance in the episode "Superman's Pal", Olsen is put in danger after his friendship with Superman is exposed. After helping him defeat Metallo, Superman gives Jimmy a signal watch for protection.
  - Olsen makes minor appearances in Justice League and Justice League Unlimited. Additionally, an unnamed mutant turtle inspired by his Giant Turtle Boy form appears in the episode "Chaos at the Earth's Core".
- Jimmy Olsen appears in The Batman two-part episode "The Batman/Superman Story", voiced by Jack DeSena.
- Jimmy Olsen appears in Batman: The Brave and the Bold, voiced by Alexander Polinsky.
- Jimmy Olsen appears in Young Justice, voiced by Dee Bradley Baker.
- Jimmy Olsen appears in the "Tales of Metropolis" segment of DC Nation Shorts, voiced by Elisha Yaffe.
- Jimmy Olsen appears in Justice League Action, voiced by Max Mittelman. This version runs his own website, "Jimmy Live", and occasionally puts himself in danger in search of views.
- Jimmy Olsen appears in DC Super Hero Girls, voiced by Ben Giroux. This version is a photographer of the Metropolis High School Daily Planetoid newspaper who takes pictures of the heroes and villains of Metropolis.
- Jimmy Olsen appears in My Adventures with Superman, voiced by Ishmel Sahid. This version is an African-American Daily Planet intern and Clark Kent's roommate who is aware of his secret identity as Superman, teaming up with him and Lois Lane. Moreover, he has a social media page called "Flamebird" that he later sells to the Daily Planet, becoming a millionaire and develops a mutual attraction with Kent's cousin, Kara-Zor-El / Supergirl, but he decides to separate from her for a while because he believes there could be someone more worthy of her. After dating women who were villains, Jimmy apologizes to Kara for treating her unfairly after she calls him out on his actions overhearing him confess his feelings for her to Marina Maru. However, Jimmy hears that Kara decided to leave him in the friend zone until he's ready in their relationship, and they also have Clark and Lois's new pet: Krypto.
  - Additionally, a gender-flipped alternate universe version of Jimmy named Jalana Olsen appears in the episode "Kiss Kiss Fall In Portal", voiced by Kimberly Brooks.
  - In a potential future depicted in the episode "All's Fair in Love and W.O.R.M.S.", Jimmy is killed by Hank Henshaw's forces, after sending his future nephew, Jon Kent, back in time.
  - Also, a alternate universe version of Jimmy as Flamebird appears in the episode "The Ex-Games", as part of the team by Ms. Gsptlsnz.
- Jimmy Olsen makes a cameo appearance in the Batman: Caped Crusader episode "The Night of the Hunters".
- Jimmy Olsen appears in Harley Quinn, voiced by Drew Massey.

=== Film ===
==== Live-action ====
- Jimmy Olsen appears in Superman (1948), portrayed by Tommy Bond.
- Jimmy Olsen appears in Atom Man vs. Superman, portrayed again by Tommy Bond.
- Jimmy Olsen appears in the Salkind/Cannon Superman film series, portrayed by Marc McClure.
- Jimmy Olsen appears in Supergirl (1984), portrayed again by Marc McClure.
- Jimmy Olsen appears in Superman Returns, portrayed by Sam Huntington. This version is an older and more confident yet incompetent photographer. Prior to Huntington's casting, Shawn Ashmore was offered the role, but he declined due to his commitments to X-Men: The Last Stand.
- Jimmy Olsen appears in Batman v Superman: Dawn of Justice, portrayed by Michael Cassidy. This version is a CIA operative who poses as a photographer during Lois Lane's journey to Africa until he is exposed and killed by terrorists.

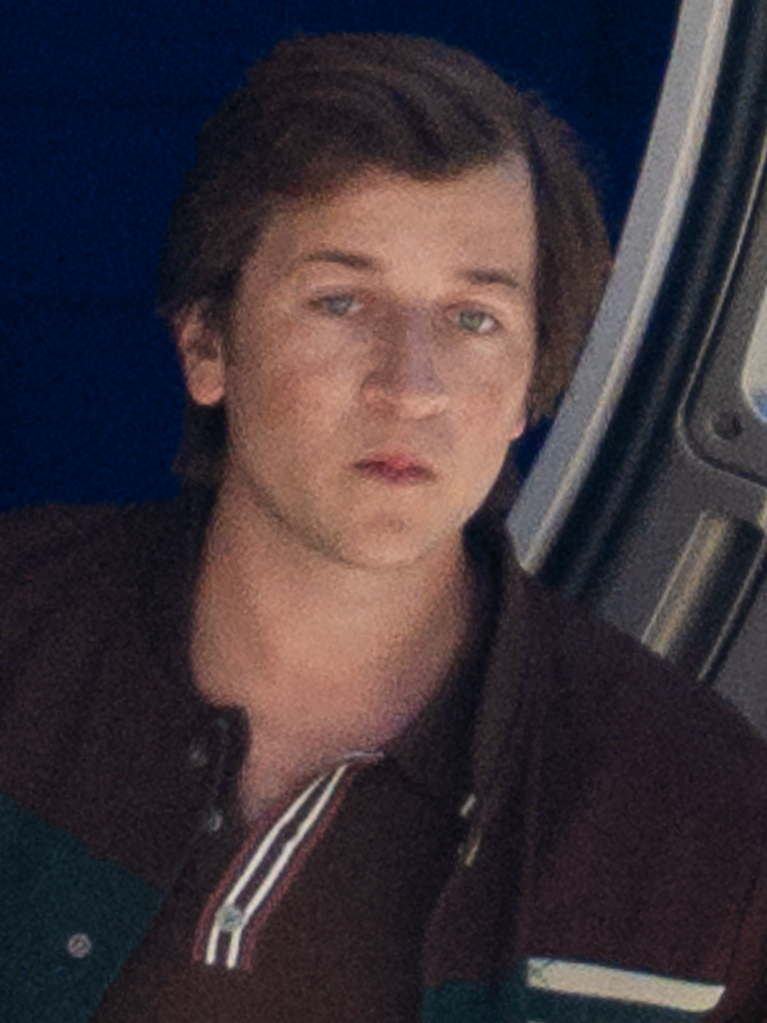
Skyler Gisondo as Jimmy Olsen in the 2025 film Superman

- Jimmy Olsen appears in films set in the DC Universe (DCU), portrayed by Skyler Gisondo.This version has a secret relationship with Lex Luthor's girlfriend, Eve Teschmacher.
  - Jimmy appears in Superman (2025). After Luthor framed Superman using a message sent by his biological parents, Jimmy set out to uncover the truth. With the help of Teschmacher, who possessed photographs documenting Luthor's corrupt conspiracy with Boravia's President Vasil Ghurkos to acquire the territory of Jarhanpur, Jimmy, Lois Lane, and their Daily Planet colleagues worked together to bring the truth to light; in doing so, they ruined Luthor's reputation and restored Superman's heroic image, while Jimmy rekindled his relationship with Teschmacher.
  - Jimmy will appear in the film Man of Tomorrow (2027).

==== Animation ====
- Jimmy Olsen appears in Showdown, voiced by Jack Mercer.
- Jimmy Olsen appears in Superman: Brainiac Attacks, voiced again by David Kaufman.
- Jimmy Olsen appears in Superman: Doomsday, voiced by Adam Wylie.
- Jimmy Olsen makes a non-speaking appearance in Justice League: The New Frontier.
- An alternate universe version of Jimmy Olsen appears as Mr. Action in Justice League: Crisis on Two Earths, voiced by Richard Green. This version is the companion of Ultraman who possesses similar powers.
- Jimmy Olsen appears in All-Star Superman, voiced by Matthew Gray Gubler.
- Jimmy Olsen appears in Justice League: Doom, voiced again by David Kaufman.
- Jimmy Olsen appears in Superman vs. The Elite, voiced again by David Kaufman.
- Jimmy Olsen appears in Superman: Unbound, voiced by Alexander Gould.This version has a brief purpose, as Lois asks him to use his Superman signal watch to call Supergirl, who is attracted to her.
- Jimmy Olsen appears in Justice League: Throne of Atlantis, voiced by Patrick Cavanaugh.
- An alternate universe version of Jimmy Olsen appears in Justice League: Gods and Monsters, voiced by Yuri Lowenthal.
- Jimmy Olsen appears in Lego DC Comics Super Heroes: The Flash, voiced by Eric Bauza.
- Jimmy Olsen appears in the DC Animated Movie Universe films The Death of Superman and Reign of the Supermen, voiced again by Max Mittelman.
- Jimmy Olsen appears in Lego DC Comics Super Heroes: Aquaman – Rage of Atlantis, voiced again by Eric Bauza.
- An alternate universe version of Jimmy Olsen appears in Superman: Red Son, voiced by Phil Morris. This version is Lex Luthor's aide and vice president before Luthor resigns and appoints him president.
- Jimmy Olsen appears in Lego DC Shazam! Magic and Monsters, voiced by Zach Callison.
- Jimmy Olsen appears in Injustice, voiced again by Zach Callison.
- Jimmy Olsen makes a non-speaking cameo appearance in Space Jam: A New Legacy.
- Jimmy Olsen appears in Batman and Superman: Battle of the Super Sons, voiced by Zeno Robinson. This version is African-American.
- Jimmy Olsen appears in Scooby-Doo! and Krypto, Too!, voiced by James Arnold Taylor. This version is a childhood friend of Daphne Blake.

=== Video games ===
- Jimmy Olsen appears in Superman 64.
- Jimmy Olsen appears in Superman: The Man of Steel, voiced by Dave Gochman.
- Jimmy Olsen appears in Superman: Shadow of Apokolips, voiced again by David Kaufman.
- Jimmy Olsen appears in DC Universe Online, voiced by Brandon Young.
- Jimmy Olsen appears in Lego Dimensions.
- Jimmy Olsen appears as a NPC in Lego DC Super-Villains, voiced again by Max Mittelman.

=== Miscellaneous ===
- Jimmy Olsen appears in The Adventures of Superman, voiced initially by Jackie Kelk and subsequently by Jack Grimes.
- The DC Universe Online incarnation of Jimmy Olsen appears in the prequel comic DC Universe Online: Legends, in which he is transformed into a reptilian metahuman after being exposed to Brainiac's Exobytes.
- The DCAU incarnation of Jimmy Olsen appears in the one-shot Superman Beyond. In the future, he purchases the Daily Planet after Perry White's death.
- Jimmy Olsen appears in the Injustice: Gods Among Us prequel comic, in which the Joker kills him while he is on a stakeout with Lois Lane.

== Cultural references ==
- Jimmy Olsen appears in the Spin Doctors' 1991 song "Jimmy Olsen's Blues".
- Jimmy Olsen makes a cameo appearance in the 2010 Chew graphic novel Just Desserts.
