= World Without Superman =

- Publisher: DC Comics
- Publication date: May 2009
- Genre: Superhero
- Title(s): Action Comics #875-889; Superman #686-698
- Main character(s): Mon-El; Chris Kent; Thara Ak-Var; Guardian; Sam Lane

Creative team
- Writer(s): James Robinson; Greg Rucka
- Artist(s): Renato Guedes; Sidney Teles

"World Without Superman" is a Superman comic book story arc published by DC Comics. It takes place in Action Comics written by Greg Rucka with art by Sidney Teles and Superman written by James Robinson with art by Renato Guedes. The story deals with Metropolis dealing with a world without Superman, who has gone to live on New Krypton to keep General Zod in check. As a result, the two Superman series, Superman and Action Comics, respectively star Mon-El and the duo of Nightwing and Flamebird.

== Plot summary ==
=== Superman ===
When Superman leaves Earth for New Krypton, he appoints Mon-El, newly freed from the Phantom Zone, to take his place as guardian of Metropolis. Mon-El assumes the secret identity of Jonathan Kent as a tribute to Clark's adoptive father, posing as Clark's cousin. The series leads directly into the Codename Patriot crossover.

=== Action Comics: The Sleepers ===
Kryptonians Chris Kent and Thara Ak-Var become the superheroes Nightwing and Flamebird on Earth and are being hunted by Ursa. The mission of the two superheroes is to hunt down Zod's sleeper agents on Earth and return them to the Phantom Zone. They start by hunting down sleeper agent Tor-Ann, who was secretly posing as a human in Australia. Next, they are confronted by Ursa, who slashes Flamebird with a kryptonite knife, but is taken down by Nightwing before Ursa can kill Thara. Chris and Thara survive the encounter and see Chris's adoptive mother Lois Lane, who helps him recover from the attack. The next mission of the Kryptonian duo deals with taking down Nadira Var-Em and Az-Rel, who are described as Krypton's equivalent of Bonnie and Clyde. This ends with Nightwing and Flamebird losing the track of the two criminals, who are held captive by Sam Lane. The series then also leads into the Codename Patriot crossover.

== See also ==
- Superman: New Krypton
- Superman: World of New Krypton
- War of the Supermen
