= Publication history of Superman =

Cover of Superman #14 (January–February 1942), art by Fred Ray

Superman is a superhero created by Jerry Siegel and Joe Shuster and featured pervasively in American comic books published by DC Comics. The character debuted in Action Comics issue #1 in June 1938 and has since become a paradigm for superhero characters.

== Creation ==
Siegel and Shuster met at Cleveland's Glenville High School. The two published a science fiction magazine together, aptly titled Science Fiction. It was a stapled, mimeographed pamphlet containing drawings by Shuster and stories by Siegel under various pseudonyms. Only five issues were produced and are now considered collectible. One copy was sold in 2018 for $50,000. Siegel's short story "The Reign of the Superman" (with illustration by Shuster) concerned a bald-headed villain, vaguely reminiscent of Flash Gordon's Ming the Merciless, bent on dominating the world.

Siegal and Shuster formulated a concept of the superman, with the character being a physically powerful hero. They pitched this unsuccessfully to newspaper syndicates as a comic strip. Siegel sent it to National Comics in New York, where it remained unpublished. When a publisher had difficulty deciding on an appropriate cover for a new magazine called Action Comics, an employee produced Siegel's and Shuster's proposal, which depicted Superman lifting a car with his hands. The publisher allegedly called it "ridiculous" but ultimately decided to put it on the cover. He wrote Siegel and Shuster and asked them if they could put together a 13-page story for the debut of Action Comics.

Siegel and Shuster cut and pasted their newspaper strip into comic book form and sent it off. In the summer of 1938, the first issue of Action Comics was published. By the fourth issue of Action Comics, its popularity had grown a significant amount. Astounded, the publisher is reported to have gone down to his local newsstand and asked a nearby child why he chose Action Comics. The child supposedly replied by expressing his favor for the featured Superman comic.

== Early years ==
Superman first appeared in Action Comics #1 (June 1938). Siegel and Shuster sold the rights to the company for $130 and a contract to supply the publisher with material. The Saturday Evening Post reported in 1960 that the pair was being paid $75,000 each per year, still a fraction of DC's Superman profits. In 1964, when Siegel and Shuster sued for more money, DC fired them, prompting a legal battle that ended in 1967, when they accepted $200,000 and signed away any further claim to Superman or any character created from him. DC soon took Siegel's and Shuster's names off the byline. Following the huge financial success of Superman in 1978 and news reports of their pauper-like existences, Warner Communications gave Siegel and Shuster lifetime pensions of $35,000 per year and health care benefits. In addition, any media production which includes the Superman character must include the credit, "Superman created by Jerry Siegel and Joe Shuster".

Throughout the decades of Superman's existence, DC sued several competing comic book publishers for introducing superheroes with similar powers. Among these companies were Fox Feature Syndicate for its character Wonderman, and Fawcett Comics for its character Master Man. In 1941, DC filed a lawsuit against Fawcett over their top-selling character of the time, Captain Marvel, whom DC saw as a Superman clone. During the National Comics Publications v. Fawcett Publications case, Fawcett fought the lawsuit, and continued publishing Captain Marvel, who surpassed Superman and other superheroes in sales in the mid-1940s. By 1953, the case had been in litigation for 12 years and in court for five. The case was decided in DC's favor. Fawcett paid DC a fine and ceased publication of all Captain Marvel-related comics. DC would acquire the rights to Captain Marvel in the 1970s and the former rival characters would be presented as allies, with Captain Marvel often serving as Superman's substitute in emergencies.

== Golden Age ==
By the time the US had entered WWII, Superman had invoked an economic golden age in the comic book industry and had engendered the new genre of the "superheroes" (though whether Superman can be named the first superhero is controversial), which by then had included Batman, Captain America, Namor, Captain Marvel, Robin, the Flash, Green Lantern, and Wonder Woman.

By this time, the character had also leapt from the comics into other media. In 1939, Superman's adventures were seen in newspaper strips, although they were often reprints of what was already appearing in the comics. Also, The Adventures of Superman radio program was broadcast to the nation with millions of listeners. While Captain Marvel beat him to live action cinema in The Adventures of Captain Marvel (in a serial originally intended for Superman), a series of animated cartoons produced by Max Fleischer hit theaters in 1940s.

After the war though, many of Superman's contemporaries found themselves slowly being forgotten after the boom became a bust. Throughout the late 1940s and the duration of the 1950s, Superman was by far the most popular character in comics. By the mid-1950s, there were few characters able to challenge him. Only Batman, Wonder Woman and a few other Golden-Agers remained. During this time, Superman's powers became more and more grandiose. They would expand to include heat vision (heat rays emitting from his eyes), the ability to breathe in space, and the power to travel through time. Superman's adversaries also grew more fantastic and mighty, but more issues of the comics involved "imaginary stories" which could result in any number of scenarios (either as a cause or an effect) and did not affect the continuity of future issues. These grander powers would be replicated within the Silver Age Superman.

It was also established shortly after World War II that Superman had begun his career years earlier in the town of Smallville, under the name of Superboy. Stories about Superboy tended to be illustrated in an idyllic fashion and has been compared to the Saturday Evening Post. Superman also became a hit in live action. The 1948 self-titled serial and its sequel Atom Man vs. Superman with Kirk Alyn as Clark Kent/Superman were both box-office smashes—the former being the biggest of all time—and his television show The Adventures of Superman starring George Reeves, was an integral part of the so-called "Golden Age of Television".

As shown in the original Golden Age comics - including Action Comics #1 (1938), Superman #1 (1939), and Superman #61 (1949), as well as in later stories such as Secret Origins (vol. 2) #1 (1986) - noted scientist Jor-L discovers that Krypton is about to explode, yet he cannot convince his fellow Kryptonians to save themselves. However, he manages to construct a spaceship to save his infant son, Kal-L. The ship launches just as the planet explodes, with Kal-L landing on Earth in a farm country town (later identified as Smallville) around the time of World War I. In this version, John and Mary Kent (passing motorists who witness the spaceship landing) take the infant to an orphanage and soon return to adopt the child, naming him Clark. In his 1942 novel, George Lowther changes the names Jor-L, Kal-L and Lora (Superman's birth mother) to Jor-El, Kal-El, and Lara. According to an interview with Joe Shuster shortly before his death, the name "Clark Kent" was chosen as a combination of actors Clark Gable and Kent Taylor.

Action Comics #1 (June 1938), the debut of Superman; cover art by Joe Shuster

Clark grows up on the Kent family farm, slowly discovering that he possesses various superpowers, but at first unaware of his Kryptonian origins. After the deaths of his adoptive parents, Clark decides to use his powers for the benefit of humanity, constructing a stylized costume and moving to the nearby city of Metropolis. Clark begins work as a reporter at the Daily Star newspaper and soon makes his debut as the world's first superhero, Superman.

The earliest Superman stories were written by Siegel, and drawn by Shuster in a style heavily influenced by comic strip artist Roy Crane. According to Jules Feiffer, "Shuster represented the best of old-style comic book drawing. His work was direct, unprettied - crude and vigorous; as easy to read as a diagram.... Slickness, thank God, was beyond his means" (Feiffer, The Great Comic Book Heroes, 1965). In the last interview Shuster gave before his death, he explained that he had modeled the visual appearance of Clark Kent on himself and movie star Harold Lloyd, and that of Superman on Douglas Fairbanks Senior. Lois Lane was modeled after Joanne Carter, who would later marry Jerry Siegel after the comic became a success. The skyscape of Metropolis was inspired by that of the city of Toronto, where Shuster had spent most of his childhood, and the newspaper employing Clark Kent, originally the Daily Star, was named after the Toronto Star for which Shuster had been a paperboy. (Mietkewicz, above)

With Superman's quick success, the demand for Superman stories exceeded the creator's ability to produce them. Although the stories continued to carry the Siegel and Shuster byline, progressively more of the work was done by assistants in the Siegel and Shuster studio (Les Daniels, Comix: A History of Comic Books in America (1971)), but the use of assistants was not always successful. According to Jules Feiffer, Shuster "could not draw well, but he drew single-mindedly -- no one could ghost that style. It was the man. When assistants began 'improving' the appearance of the strip it went downhill. It looked as though it was being drawn in a bank" (Feiffer, above). One story in which Superman encountered a fictional cartoonist provided a tongue-in-cheek look at how such work was delegated. The story, which purported on the title page to tell "how comic strips are written and drawn", showed a studio filled with "artists -- stacks of them -- figure men, background specialists, inkers, letterers" as well as script-writers, all devoted to the production of stories about a Superman-like character, while the original creator of the strip was, to Superman's consternation, kept busy answering his fan mail ("King of the Comic Books", Superman #25, 1943).

In the early stories, Superman is the only science-fiction element. He is described as the champion of the helpless and the oppressed, and he combats real-world social evils: munitions manufacturers, dangerous conditions in mines and a hit-and-run drunk driver (in Superman #1), rigged prize fights and corrupt businessmen (in Superman #2), child abusers and wife beaters (in Superman #3) and crooked cops and politicians (in Superman #7). By 1940, more extraordinary antagonists began to appear in the stories, including giants, mad scientists and dinosaurs. Superman's powers also developed during the 1940s, including vast increases in strength and acquiring the ability to fly - the earliest comics depict Superman able to leap only an eighth of a mile at a time. In Superman #61 (1949), Superman finally learns of the existence of Krypton. Superman becomes an honorary member of the Justice Society of America, though he only participates in two capers in the original Golden Age stories (All-Star Comics #8 and 36).

In his earliest adventures, Superman is pictured as being grim, strong-willed, and not afraid to take the life of an evildoer. These include examples of beating a robber to death after the thief tries to shoot him. Like the Batman of that era, he prompted a small controversy over comic characters killing. While Batman was toned down in terms of violence, Superman imposed a moral code that he would never take a life of any adversary he faced. During World War II, Superman was used as a figure of hope for readers in America and soldiers. This was evident in many of the Superman Fleischer Studios animated shorts of the era, in which Superman is helping the Allies win the war and often shown at odds with Japanese spies and German espionage agents.

Beginning in the 1940s, Superman's life as a boy is gradually fleshed out. The first Superboy story appears in More Fun Comics #101 (February 1945), but the locale is still not clearly specified, though it appears to be a Metropolis neighborhood, and the Kents still do not have names. Superboy is not established as a Smallville resident until Superboy #2 (May 1949) and his parents' names, Jonathan and Martha Kent, are not mentioned until Superboy #12 in January 1951, 12 years after his debut in Action Comics #1. Other developments in the Superman mythos appear as a result of appearances in other media, including radio and newspaper strips. The Daily Star becomes the Daily Planet - possibly because newspapers called The Daily Star already existed - and Perry White replaces original editor George Taylor in the first episode of the radio serial; a young office boy named Jimmy Olsen joins the cast soon afterward.

== The Silver Age ==
Early in the Silver Age of Comic Books, as DC was introducing new versions of old heroes, they explained that the old versions lived in a parallel dimension they called "Earth-Two". Although Superman had remained in continuous publication and was not explicitly revised for the Silver Age, the various inconsistencies between his original appearance (see Kal-L) and the version depicted in the 1960s were explained in the same way. The Superman presented during this period was the Superman of "Earth-One".

Under the editorship of Mort Weisinger, the 1950s and early 1960s oversaw a major expansion of the character's mythos with such memorable foes as Brainiac and Bizarro appearing, as well as the arrival of his cousin Kara—also known as Supergirl—and the formation of the Justice League of America. Despite this, the 1960s would be a gloomy decade for Superman. Foreshadowing this, in 1959, George Reeves, the actor who had embodied the Man of Steel in the 1950s Adventures of Superman television series, allegedly took his own life. Two Superman-related pilots, The Adventures of Superpup (1958) and The Adventures of Superboy (1961), failed. In 1966, a lavish Broadway musical entitled It's a Bird...It's a Plane...It's Superman premiered with actor Bob Holiday in the title role. Despite generally positive reviews from critics, the musical was a financial failure and ended its run after only 129 performances. In contrast to this, 1966 also saw the arrival of a successful Saturday morning animated series entitled The New Adventures of Superman.

Meanwhile, in the comics, by the mid-1960s, Superman was facing more competition for consumer appeal than ever before. Batman had become a marketing bonanza, thanks in part to his own television series, which had much higher production values than the Adventures of Superman television series. Also, a rival company called Marvel Comics had unleashed a myriad of new characters including the Hulk, the Fantastic Four and Spider-Man, whose more sophisticated characterization encouraged more compelling storytelling. Superman remained popular and viable, but he was no longer alone.

During the 1940s and 1950s, the Superman mythos gradually added familiar elements firmly established by the late 1950s, such as greater emphasis on the science fiction elements of Superman's world, including his Kryptonian origins as well as an updated version of his origins.

In the version that became established by the early 1960s (and memorably summarized at the start of each episode of the 1950s Adventures of Superman television series), Superman is born on Krypton as Kal-El, the son of Jor-El (a leader-scientist) and Lara. When Kal-El is two or three years-old, Jor-El learns that Krypton is doomed to explode. He brings this warning to the Science Council, Krypton's rulers. The Science Council refuses to warn their fellow Kryptonians and forbids Jor-El to do so. Jor-El immediately begins work on a rocket that will allow the whole family to escape the coming disaster, but events move too quickly, and only a small model is completed by the time of the final quakes. Lara stays by her husband's side rather than accompany Kal-El to Earth so that his ship will have a better chance of surviving the trip. Knowing that Earth's lower gravity and yellow Sun will give the boy extraordinary powers, Jor-El launches Kal-El's rocketship toward Earth moments before Krypton explodes.

Kal-El's ship lands in a field near the town of Smallville and is discovered by Jonathan and Martha Kent. They name the child Clark after Martha's maiden name. After formally adopting him, the Kents raise him. The Kents discover his amazing powers and train their adopted son to use his powers constructively. At the age of eight, Clark adopts the superhero identity "Superboy" and fights crime, both in the present and in the far future as a member of the Legion of Super-Heroes. After his graduation from high school and the death of his adoptive parents, Clark moves to Metropolis to attend Metropolis University. During his junior year, Clark changes his superhero name to "Superman". After graduating with a degree in journalism, Clark is hired by the Daily Planet.

== The Bronze Age ==
Despite a changing market, Superman's stories remained similar to those which defined the Silver Age for quite a while. However, by the 1970s, it became apparent that even the Man of Steel needed some polishing. Superman entered the 1970s under famed artist and writer Jack Kirby. Kirby chose to revamp the spin-off title Superman's Pal, Jimmy Olsen, using it as a platform for his Fourth World concept. Among the creations first appearing therein was Darkseid, an alien warlord powerful enough to pose a great threat to even Superman himself.

During this same time period, editor Mort Weisinger was replaced by Julius Schwartz, who wanted to transition Superman to a more modern and realistic form. To this end, Schwartz recruited up-and-coming talents such as writers Dennis O'Neil, Elliot S. Maggin, Cary Bates, and cover artist Neal Adams, as well as veteran Superman artists Curt Swan and Murphy Anderson. This shift was marked by a major storyline entitled Kryptonite Nevermore, written by O'Neil, that significantly lowered Superman's power level and eliminated most of the kryptonite on Earth, but soon after the storyline ended, O'Neil stepped down as writer and both of these changes were eventually reversed.

Also, Superman's Earth-2 counterpart married the Lois Lane of his world, and new rivals such as Terra-Man and the Parasite appeared. In 1978, the film Superman was released. The film featured groundbreaking special effects and stars such as Marlon Brando and Gene Hackman, but it was the performance of newcomer Christopher Reeve under the direction of Richard Donner that made the film come alive in the eyes of many critics. The film engendered a series of sequels throughout the 1980s, but the later three sequels proved to be less successful than the first. In 1970, the Galaxy Broadcasting System and its president, Morgan Edge, purchased the Daily Planet, Edge subsequently naming Clark as the lead anchorman for its Metropolis television station, WGBS-TV. Later in the 1970s, childhood friend Lana Lang joins Clark in his newscasts as his fellow co-anchor.

After the establishment of DC Comics' Multiverse in the 1960s, it is established retroactively that the Golden Age version of Superman lives on the parallel world of Earth-Two and is named "Kal-L", while his Silver Age/Bronze Age counterpart lives on Earth-One and is named "Kal-El".

While the Multiverse allowed for DC Comics to bring the Golden Age stories back into continuity, it also created problems. There had been no break in Superman stories between the Golden and Silver Ages; the character had been published in one ongoing story since his debut. Additionally, DC had dropped the name "Kal-L" in favor of "Kal-El" before the end of the Golden Age. A series of stories in the 1970s establish that the Earth-Two Superman had married his version of Lois Lane in the 1950s (Action Comics #484 (1978)) and had become the editor-in-chief of The Daily Star. In the early 1970s, Kal-L discovers a Kryptonian rocket that contains his cousin, Kara Zor-L. After acclimating to Earth, Kara becomes the superheroine Power Girl. Kal-L also continues to serve with the revived Justice Society; he is revealed as a founding member of the group in the team's origin story in DC Special #29. In the early 1980s, Kal-L is also shown as a member of the All-Star Squadron during World War II.

While the comics continued to sell, DC Comics decided that Superman and all of their properties needed a vast overhaul.

== The Modern Age ==
The Man of Steel #1, the 1980s revision of Superman.

In a 12-issue 1985 miniseries entitled Crisis on Infinite Earths all of the DC heroes battled an evil being called the Anti-Monitor, resulting in the destruction of most of DC's alternate dimensions. Following this series, the backstories of all of DC's characters were altered and updated. Superman was given an overhaul in the 1986 limited series The Man of Steel by writer/artist John Byrne. This 1986 reboot brought substantial changes to the character and met huge success at the time, being one of the top-selling books.

During Crisis, the various parallel Earths are combined into one, retroactively eliminating some of Earth-Two's heroes from existence. Kal-L, the Earth-Two Superman, his wife Lois Lane of Earth-Two, the Superboy of Earth-Prime and Alexander Luthor, Jr. of Earth-Three, have no reality to call their own, and they enter a "paradise dimension" at the end of the series. Kal-L is not seen again until the miniseries The Kingdom, in which it is revealed that he has found a means of exiting his dimension, but chooses not to do so yet.

DC Comics retired the Silver Age version of Superman in 1986, after the publication of Crisis on Infinite Earths. Just before the character's revamp, the Silver Age Superman was given a sendoff in the two-part story Whatever Happened to the Man of Tomorrow? published in Superman #423 and Action Comics #583, written by Alan Moore with art by Curt Swan. Although the new Modern Age version of Superman is said to have already been active for many years, most previous Superman appearances and elements were rendered out of continuity by John Byrne's The Man of Steel. Later stories such as Superman: Birthright bring many of the Silver Age elements back into continuity.

In Byrne's version, Superman came from the planet Krypton, which was re-imagined as a cold, sterile world in deep contrast to the wonderworld of the past 48 years. Once Kal-El's rocketship (containing genetic materials and a birthing-matrix which resulted in him being "born" on Earth) reached Earth he was adopted by Martha and Jonathan Kent. Instead of bringing him to an orphanage only to adopt him later, the Kents pretended that he was their own son. In the new version, Clark's powers developed gradually, and he never assumed the identity of Superboy, and unlike most pre-existing versions, the Kents survived throughout Clark's adult years and remain important supporting characters in the comics to this day.

Also, Superman's powers were scaled down, removing several of his more fantastic abilities in an attempt to make the stories more exciting. Superman's strength and speed were still immense, but there was a feeling of limits to them. In Metropolis, he faced a revised rogues gallery, including a new version of Lex Luthor who was recreated as an evil billionaire and philanthropist.

Due perhaps to the elder Kents surviving into Clark's adulthood, another Byrne change was the relationship between Superman and his "normal" alter-ego. In line with the majority of superheroes Byrne put the emphasis on Superman being a disguise for Clark Kent. Previously the theme had been that Kent was a "secret identity" for Superman: in an adventure published in the 1960s, Kent finds himself at a loose end when staff at the Daily Planet go on strike and seriously considers it a chance to try out a new identity in case he has "to abandon [his] Clark Kent role permanently". His options include becoming a full-time policeman or even a mere tramp "whom no one would ever suspect of being the Man of Steel".

There was also his relationships with other heroes, most notably Batman. From the 1940s to the 1970s, they had always been depicted as close friends and allies: the "World's Finest". From the 1980s, however, it was depicted it as an edgy and uneasy one: grudging respect and uneasy friendship due to their vast differences. After their first, tension-filled meeting, Batman considers that in "another reality" he and Superman may have been friends.

Byrne quit the books a few years later, though his changes became the template for Superman's origin and characterization for almost two decades, most notably, his alterations to Lex Luthor, altering him from a mad scientist to an evil businessman, and having Ma and Pa Kent kept alive as supporting characters. One of the most notable revisions was the elimination of the Superboy persona from Superman's life, though a new live action television series starring Superboy premiered in 1988. Despite its following, the series has not been seen in North America and most of Europe since 1992, but its first season was released on DVD in 2006. A subsequent live action television show, Lois & Clark: The New Adventures of Superman, focused on the relationship between Lois Lane and Clark Kent.

Superman exiles himself to space for a number of issues after he is forced to execute some Kryptonian criminals from a different dimension. The repercussions of Superman's use of lethal force have been dealt with in several stories by subsequent writers. Clark Kent proposes to Lois Lane and reveals his secret identity; Lane accepts.

In 1992, DC Comics published the storyline The Death of Superman, in which Superman battles a monster of then-unknown origins called Doomsday. Both Superman and Doomsday are killed, taking each other down with their final blows. Funeral for a Friend follows The Death of Superman, chronicling Superman's funeral and examines other characters' reactions to the death of the hero.

Next, DC published the Reign of the Supermen storyline, during which four different characters - a new Superboy, the cyborg Man of Tomorrow, the brutal Last Son of Krypton and Steel - are introduced as Superman, although none of them actually are. A de-powered Kal-El later surfaces in a Kryptonian battle-suit near the end of Reign of the Supermen. After Steel and Supergirl destroy the battle-suit, Kal-El is revealed as the pilot, wearing a black costume with a silver 'S' shield and long hair. The cyborg allies with Mongul and destroys Coast City. Superman, Superboy, Supergirl, Steel, Hal Jordan and the Eradicator attack the "Engine City" built on top of Coast City, and the united Supermen defeat the Man of Tomorrow, who is exposed as scientist Hank Henshaw. After the Reign of the Supermen storyline, Lois and Clark are reunited. When they eventually marry in the 1996 special Superman: The Wedding Album, it coincided with the marriage of the two characters in the television series Lois & Clark: The New Adventures of Superman.

The real hero returned, but the story's aftermath lead to fellow superhero Green Lantern losing his mind and becoming a villain called Parallax. This led to the 1994 limited series Zero Hour which was a sequel-of-sorts to Crisis on Infinite Earths. For a few months after his return from the grave, Superman sported shoulder-length hair, and thus Clark Kent wore a ponytail. Exactly how he was able to grow his hair was never explained.

In 1996, Superman (or rather, Clark Kent) finally married Lois Lane, and while they have had their ups and downs as a couple, they are happily married. That same year, Superman returned to animation in the animated series Superman which was produced by Bruce Timm and Paul Dini of Batman: The Animated Series fame. The series combined elements of both the pre-and-post-Crisis versions of the character and featured an all-star cast including Tim Daly as Superman, Dana Delany as Lois Lane, and Clancy Brown as Lex Luthor.

Amidst much controversy, in the Superman comics of the late 1990s, Superman loses his traditional powers and transforms into a being of electromagnetic energy (see Superman Red/Superman Blue). In this form, Superman can phase through solid objects, see frequencies of energy, and draw power from electrical sources. In order to maintain physical cohesion in this form, he needs to wear a containment suit. During this time, he is able to transform into the corporeal form of Clark Kent but has no special powers in his human guise.

In 2004, DC published an updated version of Superman's origin in the 12-issue limited series Birthright. Written by Mark Waid, Birthright restores some of the pre-Crisis elements eliminated by John Byrne, including an emphasis on alien heritage. The "birthing matrix" is replaced by the more well-known rocketship, with Kal-El leaving Krypton as an infant rather than a fetus. Clark now possesses the ability to see a living being's "aura", and becomes a vegetarian. His 'S' shield is a symbol of hope from his homeworld, and his costume is made from fabrics put in his spaceship during his journey. Lex Luthor is also now a childhood friend in this version. Due to the effects of Infinite Crisis, this origin is no longer valid. In the 2005–2006 Infinite Crisis miniseries (the sequel to Crisis on Infinite Earths), the Earth-Two Superman (Kal-L) escapes from the "paradise" dimension with Alexander Luthor Jr. and Superboy-Prime. Kal-L wants to recreate the universe, which he believes is corrupt, making aspects of Earth-Two predominant, rather than those of Earth-One. He believes this will also save the dying Lois Lane of Earth-Two. Alexander Luthor, Jr. builds a machine which re-creates Earth-Two, transporting Kal-L and Lois there where Lois revives briefly before collapsing and dying. In grief, Kal-L lashes out at the Earth-One Superman, and the two fight until Wonder Woman arrives and ends their battle.

The two Supermen team up to confront Luthor, Jr. and Superboy-Prime, whose plan to restore the Multiverse will kill billions of people. The pair willingly deplete their powers as they drag Superboy-Prime into Rao, Krypton's red sun, and use the last of their strength to defeat him on Mogo, the sentient Green Lantern planet. Fatally wounded in the battle, Kal-L dies in his cousin Power Girl's arms. He and Lois are buried next to the deceased Superboy.

Infinite Crisis Secret Files and Origins 2006 shows that Superboy-Prime is to blame for many continuity errors in the DC Universe. In his attempt to escape reality, his assault on the barrier wall of the paradise dimension alters history, causing revisions of events to occur, especially the Birthright origin. Alexander Luthor Jr.'s attempts to manipulate the Multiverse result in New Earth, affecting Superman's history further. During the publication of the Infinite Crisis limited series, the majority of DC Comics' superhero line advanced one year. One year later, Superman remains powerless, and Supergirl defends Metropolis. Unburdened by his responsibility to the world, Clark Kent has re-solidified his reputation as a star reporter. Although he manages to weasel his way out of prison, Lex Luthor's reputation is damaged irreparably (partially due to Clark's writing) and so are his fortune and power over LexCorp, now run by Lana Lang. Under attack, Clark's powers gradually return, and he returns to action. He finds that his sensory powers are enhanced, as are his computational abilities and memory.

== The Post-Modern Age ==
=== Birthright ===
In 2003, DC Comics released a 12-issue miniseries called Superman: Birthright, written by Mark Waid and penciled by Leinil Francis Yu; this series was a retcon of Superman's post-Crisis origin, replacing Byrne's version, yet using some elements from that version; it also reintroduced various pre-Crisis elements discarded in Byrne's revamp, along with elements that subtly tie into the Smallville television show. Due to the effects of Infinite Crisis, both Birthright and The Man of Steel were removed from canon.

=== New Earth ===
Action Comics #850 (2007) presents the latest revision of Superman's origin, since the history of the DC Universe was reset in Infinite Crisis. The new timeline is indicated to revise the complicated web of origins in a panel which shows a progression of four to five successive versions of Superman that are viewed by Kara Zor-El, clearly aping the art styles of Joe Shuster, Curt Swan, John Byrne, Dan Jurgens and Leinil Francis Yu.

Written collaboratively by Kurt Busiek, Fabian Nicieza and Geoff Johns, the new version includes details such as Krypto's presence on Krypton, Jor-El's frustrations with the Council of Krypton refusing to evacuate the planet, Clark's awareness of his adopted status from a younger age, having interacted with Lex Luthor at a younger age, Clark not being the direct cause of Lex's baldness, his wearing glasses as far back as his early teens in Smallville, and using his powers to help others at a younger age. The new version also supports the portrayal and aesthetic design of Jor-El, now similar to Marlon Brando's portrayal of the role, and Krypton, as featured in the ongoing Richard Donner co-authored arcs of Action Comics (essentially rendering Krypton closer in style to his and Bryan Singer's shared film continuity), as well as the fitting in with the discovery in The Lightning Saga that Clark was a member of the Legion of Super-Heroes during his adolescence and still retains possession of a Legion flight ring. Superman is established as a founding member of the Justice League in Justice League of America (vol. 2) #0.

=== Ongoing titles ===
All-Star Superman, launched in 2005, is a limited series under DC's All-Star imprint, written by Grant Morrison and drawn by Frank Quitely. DC claims that this series will "strip down the Man of Steel to his timeless, essential elements", but the version presented is based on the pre-Crisis Silver Age version of the character, and Morrison has stated this, claiming it to be the Superman that still exists despite being retconned 20 years earlier. The All-Star imprint attempts to retell some of the history of DC's iconic characters, but outside of the strict DC universe continuity.

Following the events of Infinite Crisis and the "Up, Up and Away!" storyline, the two major Superman titles have followed two major story arcs. Action Comics deals with Superman and wife Lois adopting Chris Kent, a Kryptonian child who is revealed to be the child of General Zod. After resolving this arc, Superman has dealt with the return of one of his most dangerous villains, Brainiac, which resulted in the arrival of thousands of Kryptonians on Earth and the death of his adoptive father. In New Krypton, the Kryptonians create a new planet, New Krypton, and raise it opposite Earth's place in the Solar System. In Superman: World of New Krypton, Superman decides to leave Earth to live among the Kryptonians, hoping to establish peace between humanity and the Kryptonians. The events of Last Stand of New Krypton and War of the Supermen devastate New Krypton and cause Superman to battle General Zod. He returns Zod to the Phantom Zone and then returns to Earth. In Superman: Grounded, Superman walks across the United States of America with the goal of reconnecting with the everyday people he is committed to protect. In the Reign of Doomsday storyline, Superman and his closest allies must defeat the Doomslayer, a mysterious being that seeks to destroy Doomsday and all life on Earth.

== The New 52 ==
Superman, reinterpreted following the events of The New 52; art by George Pérez

In 2011, DC Comics rebooted its continuity and relaunched its publications with new #1 issues. Changes to Superman includes making him a single man and the deaths of his parents, Jonathan and Martha Kent, which occurred years prior. Superman also wears a ceremonial battle armor that pays tribute to his Kryptonian legacy. The new armor is visually similar to his classic outfit, with the only difference is the lack of the traditional red briefs. In addition, real-life astrophysicist Neil deGrasse Tyson assisted DC Comics in determining that Krypton orbited the red dwarf LHS 2520 in the constellation Corvus 27.1 lightyears from Earth.

- Action Comics was originally set five years in the past and details Superman's early adventures as the protector of Metropolis for the first 18 issues and the first Annual. In this title, Superman wears a shirt with the S symbol, a smaller cape, a pair of jeans and worker boots. A rationale is given later in the title for the acquisition of the battle armor, after which Superman abandons the shirt, focusing into his personal growth as the later, mature Superman. Issues #19-21 focused on a three-part storyline that took place one year before the present and afterwards the series focused on Superman's adventures in the present alongside the main Superman title.
- Superman is set in the character's present years and details his current adventures. In this title, Clark quits working for the Daily Planet and becomes an independent blogger.

This version of Superman also began a relationship with Wonder Woman, a move which attracted media attention due to Superman's long-standing relationship with Lois Lane in all previous incarnations of the character, with the exception of non-canon stories, which took place in DC's Elseworlds imprint. Superman is also depicted as a founding member of the Justice League. DC released the Superman/Wonder Woman comic book series in 2013, which focused on them as a couple. Geoff Johns revealed that Superman and Wonder Woman's relationship will end badly. Later on during the Truth storyline, Superman ended the relationship out of frustration with the loss of his powers and doubts about the two's compatibility. A third Superman book, Superman Unchained, was released in June 2013 to coincide with the release of the new Superman film, Man of Steel, written by Scott Snyder and drawn by Jim Lee. The book concluded publication in November 2014. In February 2015, due to Clark exposing to the world his secret identity, Superman received a new power and a new outfit, starting in Superman #38, by Geoff Johns and John Romita, Jr. This version of Superman is eventually killed in Superman #52.

=== Convergence ===
In the miniseries Convergence, which featured the pre-Flashpoint Superman and Lois Lane, with the couple expecting a baby. Convergence also shows the birth of their son, Jon Kent. Following the events, in the miniseries Superman: Lois & Clark, they settled into the New 52 reality under the aliases of Clark and Lois White, and witnessed the events revolving the alternate versions of themselves and the former's enemies. They would later appear as part of the final issues for the New 52 Action Comics and Superman series, where in the end the New 52 Superman would pass the torch to his predecessor just before he died.

== DC Rebirth ==
Superman, as depicted following the events of DC Rebirth. Art by Andy Park.

In June 2016, DC Comics relaunched its entire line of comic books series with DC Rebirth, including both the Action Comics and Superman series. The Superman of the pre-New 52 reality lives with his wife Lois Lane of his reality and their son Jon Kent. This Superman wears a costume similar in style to the Superman outfit in the film Batman v Superman: Dawn of Justice (2016).

The story arc Superman Reborn smooths over the discrepancies between the two versions of the character. According to Mr. Mxyzptlk, the creation of the New 52 caused Superman to be separated into two people: the New 52 character who served as the protagonist of the Superman books in 2011-2015 and the pre-Flashpoint character who took part in the Convergence event and sired Jon. Thanks to Jon, the new Superboy, the two Supermen merge into one complete version of Superman, rearranging their shared histories and accommodating them into the restored DC Universe. This complete Superman features a new suit that combines elements from the two eras. To celebrate the release of issue #1,000 for Action Comics which was released on April 18, 2018, Superman was returned to his original pre-New 52 costume.

== See also ==
- Golden Age of Comic Books
