= Pete Woods =

American comic book artist (born 1971)

- Born: Peter Woods; July 17, 1971 (age 55) United States
- Areas: Penciller, Inker
- Notable works: Action Comics; Amazons Attack; Deadpool; Robin; Superman

Peter Woods is an American comic book artist, known for his work on titles such as Backlash, Deadpool, Robin, Catwoman, Amazons Attack, and Action Comics.

== Career ==
Woods worked as an intern for Wildstorm comics in April 1996 working under artist Jim Lee. Here he got his first major comics work filling in on Stormwatch and Wetworks in 1996, before getting a short run on Backlash in 1997. He moved over to Marvel Comics to draw a few issues of Excalibur before starting a critically acclaimed run on Deadpool with Joe Kelly. He was then picked up by DC Comics for a four-year stint on Robin, from 2000 to 2004, followed by an exclusive contract in 2001 and further work in DC titles.

He later partnered with other Portland, Oregon area artists and formed Mercury Studio in 2002. Mercury Studio increased in membership and changed its name to "Periscope Studios" in June 2007, but remains a collective of cartoonists, illustrators, writers, concept designers, graphic novelists and storyboard artists based in Portland, Oregon. His wife, Rebecca, whom he met at Wildstorm, is also a part of the Portland studio.

Woods would then become one of the artists in the Superman family of titles, working on the "New Krypton" arc in Action Comics and the Last Stand of New Krypton mini-series. He returned Action Comics in 2010, alongside writer Paul Cornell.

== Awards ==
- 1998: Deadpool #11 was nominated for the "Best Single Issue or Story" Harvey Award

== Bibliography ==
=== DC Comics ===
- Action Comics #837, 840–843, 871–873, 890–892, 894–898, 900 (2006–2011)
- Amazons Attack (2007)
- Batman: Arkham Unhinged #10 (2012)
- Catwoman vol. 2 #44–52 (2005–2006)
- Countdown #16–14 (along with Tom Derenick) (2008)
- DC 1st: Green Lantern (along with Jamal Igle) (2002)
- DCU Infinite Holiday Special (Superman/Batman) #1 (2007)
- Detective Comics #790–800, 810 (2004–2005)
- Green Lantern/Power Girl: Circle of Fire (2000)
- Harley Quinn #8–9, 13 (2001)
- Infinity, Inc. #8–10 (2008)
- Joker: Last Laugh #1 (2001)
- Legion Lost vol. 2 #1–7, 9–14, 0 (2011–2012)
- Justice League vol. 3 #34–36, 40, 42–43 (2017–2018)
- Justice League of America's Vibe #5 (2013)
- Red Hood and the Outlaws vol. 2 #26–31, 33–36 (2018–2019)
- Robin #74–80, 82–85, 87–91, 93–94, 97–100, 102, 104–109, 111–120 (2000–2004)
- Secret Six vol. 2 #6 (2009)
- Smallville #5 (among other artists) (2004)
- Superman #601–602, 650–653 (2002–2006)
- Superman: Last Stand of New Krypton #1–3 (2010)
- Superman: New Krypton Special (among other artists) (2008)
- Superman: World of New Krypton (along with Ron Randall) (2009–2010)
- Tales of the Sinestro Corps: Superman Prime (along with Jerry Ordway) (2007)

=== Marvel Comics ===
- Baby's First Deadpool Book (among other artists) (1998)
- Deadpool #11–13, 20, 26, 28–32 (1997–1999)
- Deadpool Team-Up #1 (1998), #900 (2009)
- Excalibur #112–114 (1997)
- Generation X Annual '99 (along with Kevin Sharpe & Yancey Labat) (1999)
- X-Men: Deadly Genesis (X-Men backup stories) (2006)

=== Other publishers ===
- Shotgun Mary: Deviltown (Antarctic Press, July 1996)
- Stormwatch #39 (Image Comics, 1996)
- Terminator Salvation: The Final Battle (Dark Horse Comics, December 2013)
- Archie #18–22, 699 (Archie Comics, 2017–2018)
