= Superman: Grounded =

Comic book story arc

"Grounded"
- Cover art to Superman #701, the first issue of the arc. Art by John Cassaday.
- Publisher: DC Comics
- Publication date: June 2010 – August 2011
- Genre: Superhero
- Title(s): Superman #701-714
- Main character: Clark Kent/Superman

Creative team
- Writer(s): J. Michael Straczynski; Chris Roberson
- Penciller: Eddy Barrows
- Inker: J. P. Mayer
- Letterer: John J. Hill
- Colorist: Rod Reis
- Editor: Matt Idelson

"Grounded" is a 2010-2011 comic book story arc that ran through the Superman monthly ongoing series. It was written by J. Michael Straczynski and Chris Roberson, and penciled by Eddy Barrows, with covers by John Cassaday.

Following the year-long New Krypton storyline, the story depicts Superman's return to Earth after residing on New Krypton. Exiting a congressional hearing about the "Hundred Minute War", he is confronted with the notion that he has grown disconnected from everyday Americans he has been committed to watching over, and doesn't truly know what his adopted people are like anymore. Feeling a responsibility to his adopted homeland, he begins a long journey where he will walk across the United States to reconnect with the everyday people he is committed to protecting.

== Publication history ==
In June 2010, Superman reached issue #700, and writer J. Michael Straczynski, a Superman fan who felt 'a personal connection to the character', took over writing duties with a short story in the issue, and had his run on the title begin in earnest with issue #701. Artist Eddy Barrows, a previous Action Comics artist and one of the artists on the War of the Supermen limited series, is Straczynski's artistic collaborator.

When discussing writing such an important character to him, Straczynski claimed to know Superman's place in American iconography: "For me, Superman was, is and shall forever be America's hero. Yes, his mandate is to protect the people of the world, he doesn't take sides, he's not overtly political...but like jazz and comic books themselves, he is inexorably tied to our culture and way of life. He stands for all the things we like to believe we stand for, especially when standing is the most difficult, when it would be simpler and easier to turn away". The storyline was noted for bearing striking resemblance to early Captain Marvel stories, which were a trans-American tour of the titular superhero for the purpose of a marketing ploy.

To amplify this, Straczynski felt that the opposite effect of New Krypton should be the new premise of the title: "...When DC's Dan DiDio approached me about re-invigorating Superman, my first thought was, take him back to his roots. Bring him back to the soil that nourished him, literally and figuratively. 'Pin him to the Earth', I said. Let him set out on a journey across America, on foot, so that we can see ourselves in his eyes and he can see himself in ours, and gain a better understanding on both sides as to who we are, who he is, and where we're going".

=== Contest ===
In order to depict a correct representation of America, DC Comics asked readers to write in and campaign for their towns and residents to be depicted in the series. In an afterword to the prologue story in "Grounded", Straczynski assured readers that the story would not depict an idealist America that most Superman readers would expect: "It should be mentioned that this journey is not intended as a blind paean: as he moves across rich areas and poor ones, though the midwest and the rust belt, through cities on the rise and those on the downward slide, we will be honest in what we show: there will be casual cruelties and drive-by selfishness, as well as problems and difficulties that even he can't solve. Powerful as he is, he cannot defeat poverty, or inequity, or our blind, headlong drive toward self-destruction. But alongside those faults we will feature the charity, the decency, the compassion and the stubborn, noble courage of the human race, and rediscover why he has come to represent the best of us while never shrinking from the worst of us".

=== Changes in the creative team ===
In November 2010, Straczynski announced to leave the series halfway through the storyline's run. This he did in order to concentrate on other projects as well as a sequel to Superman: Earth One. The storyline was finished by Chris Roberson when he took over as writer for the arc.

In an interview, Roberson noted that:

"When I signed on in October of last year, they gave me a one-page... you could charitably call it an outline, written by Straczynski where he saw the remaining issues going. I think it was drafted at a point where he assumed he'd be writing them. So this is what he's giving DC Editorial to draft solicitation copy.

Apparently, at some point after that, before Superman: Earth One has come out, Straczynski decides that the monthly books don't matter anymore because he knows there's a relaunch coming, so he can comfortably quit and let somebody else finish the story for him.

When given this one-page outline, it was with the context that "here's where we were going to go, use of it what you want and do your own stuff", and basically the only things I was beholden to were to have Superman go to each of eight towns and eight cities in each of the issues, Superman is walking from East to West, and in issue 708, Wonder Woman shows up, and in 709, the Flash shows up. Beyond that, everything you see on the page is mine".

== Plot synopsis ==
=== Prologue ===
After exiting a congressional hearing about the "War of the Supermen", Superman is questioned by reporters when he is slapped by a crying woman. Visibly shocked, he encourages the outraged crowd to let her speak. She tells him that while he was off-planet, her husband died of a brain tumor. She tried reaching him to ask for his help in removing the tumor with his vision powers, but was told that he was "doing something important". Superman flies to the JLA Satellite, where Batman assures him that the new Earth defense system will see new threats coming from long distances. Outside a small town, Superman speaks with the Flash, and asks him what he sees when he runs across the country. He says he sees a blur. Superman then flies into orbit, thinks of his father, and lands outside a children's baseball game when he begins his long walk across the United States.

=== Part 1: Philadelphia ===
Superman walks through Philadelphia and helps a man fixing his car. He meets with Lois Lane and tells her to tell Perry White that Clark is running his story. During his stay in Philadelphia, he helps cleaning a restaurant, defeats a gang of drug dealers, advises a man to go to the doctor to get his heart checked, and convinces a woman not to take her own life.

=== Part 2: Detroit ===
Superman reaches Detroit and sees some people playing basketball. The players are bullying one of their friends, Markey G. Superman plays with them without using his powers. Markey G gets a basket on Superman and earns the approval of his friends. Superman hears a vibration and approaches a seemingly normal looking man at his house. The man is revealed to be an alien, and when he leads Superman into the house a large, black creature attacks Superman. Superman dismantles the creature and the aliens reveal that they came from the planet Natalla to escape from an unknown tragedy. They plead with Superman not to reveal them, given how hard their life is back home. They point out that he too is an alien. Superman points out that it is a bad time to immigrate illegally in the United States. The alien says that their race is self-sufficient and they are not making an impact in their society. Superman asks them what they're giving back to their community. He decides to think for a while before making his decision. Superman encounters an old shut down factory, and meets an elderly man who provides security. He describes the plant as it used to be, and asks to see Superman fly. Superman obliges, then leaves. As he's leaving, the man collapses. Superman takes him to the aliens, who heal him. The aliens buy the factory and use their technology to rebuild it and hire the people who used to work there. Clark Kent, on assignment to cover Superman's walk, writes an article on the whole thing. Lois talks with Superman on the phone about this as he keeps walking. He is being watched at a distance by Batman.

=== Part 3: Ohio ===
Superman holds an ex-convict in mid-air, forcing him to stop stalking a waitress. Later, Batman meets Superman and the two talk in a rooftop. Batman believes Superman is endangering innocent lives in his journey. The two go separate ways. In the Daily Planet, Lois Lane finds an article that states that debris of New Krypton reached Earth. Superman flies to Danville, Ohio, where he finds one of the impact sites. As he searches the impact site, some children have already found one of the debris pieces. They present it to their teacher, Lisa Jennings, who is blasted with some energy from the piece. The teacher finds Willy Trask, a town drunk, in a bar and touches him, giving Trask powers. Superman talks with a police officer, but Trask attacks him. After a short fight, Superman subdues him, and Trask's powers disappear. However, the city has been left devastated during their fight. Although Superman rebuilds it, this leads the public to make negative comments against him, including Ms. Jennings. The news is heard by Batman in the Watchtower.

=== Interlude: Rushmark ===
Lois goes to Rushmark, Indiana, a fictional town Superman is expected to go to in his walk across the United States. There, Lois meets Brian, an old college friend. Brian tells Lois that he is married and has two children. He invites her to his house for dinner, and Lois accepts. At Brian's home, Lois meets Huong, Brian's wife. After dinner, Lois talks with Huong and admits that she has doubts about her current life. Huong tells Lois that she should not be thinking about the life she might have had, or she will be miserable. Later, Lois catches Brian and Huong having an argument over work-life issues. Lois leaves and walks across the neighborhood. But as soon as she crosses a bridge, Superman appears and carries her up to the sky. The two kiss and Lois asks Superman if he needs her. Superman tells Lois that one of the things that make him human is her. With her spirit rekindled, Lois kisses Superman again, and he takes her to Chicago.

=== Part 4: Chicago ===
Superman walks across Chicago, and he sees that people are uneasy about his stay in the city, due to the incident in Ohio. He is also aware that Jennings is spying on him. Superman then meets with Lois in a park, and they go to an apartment to spend the night together. He then dreams about a three-headed creature destroying Chicago, and of Jennings mocking him with his failure to protect the people. Superman wakes up and sees that his face has real injuries from his fight against the three-headed creature in his dreams. Lois covers his injuries and Superman leaves the apartment without being seen. Later, Superman walks across a neighborhood and sees a boy and his mother being brutally beaten by his father. Superman captures the father and takes him to the police station. There, he is informed that mother and son will be taken by child protective services to a safe places and the police will file charges against the father. Superman gives a phone number to the boy, telling him to call him every day. Superman then leaves Chicago, but not before telling the police that the only thing needed to stop the violence was "someone, anyone, with a pair of eyes, a voice, a phone and ten cents' worth of compassion".

=== Interlude: Daily Planet ===
The Daily Planet is facing problems. According to Ron Troupe, a blog called Urbanitis has posted an article that accuses the Daily Planet of bribing Superman into giving them exclusives, due to Superman's relationship with Lois Lane. To solve this, Perry White fires photographer Sandeep and tasks him with talking with Jack Hoffman, the creator of Urbanitis, so that he can reveal what he knows. According to Perry, Sandeep cannot go to Urbanitis as a Daily Planet employee, since it would look like intimidation. Perry tells Sandeep that if he succeeds, he can have his old job back.

Jack meets with Perry and shows him a report showing that $20,000 of unaccounted for funding going into the Planet's expense account every quarter for the past five years and vanishing again about a week after deposit. Perry replies that the deposits come from his personal account and that they have been the difference between keeping the summer internship program and cutting it.

Jack then shows him the picture a fangirl sent to him. The picture shows Superman and Lois kissing, but Sandeep comes in and says that the woman in the picture is not Lois. This reveals Sandeep's status as a mole to Jack. Sandeep then takes out a poster for a party that shows a boy dressed as Superman kissing a red-headed girl. Sandeep says that someone must have edited Lois and Superman's faces into the picture. This effectively makes Jack's evidence invalid.

Perry tells Jack to post a public apology and retraction from his website, and gives him a summer internship. Perry says that Sandeep can be of great use for the Planet and gives Sandeep his old job back.

=== Part 5: Des Moines ===
Superman arrives to Des Moines, Iowa and does several heroic deeds, but the people still distrust him. He calls Lois to and confides in her his doubts about what he is truly fighting for. When she replies that he is fighting for "Truth, Justice and American Way", Superman replies that things are not as simple as they used to be. Suddenly, Lois hears an explosion, and she sees that a chemical plant is burning. Superman saves the workers and puts out the fire.

As he goes to see if the workers are injured, Superman sees that Manuel, Lois's friend, is arguing with one of the plant's owners. Lois explains that Manuel used to work at the plant, but he was fired when he started protesting the lax environmental standards. Superman promises to leave the workers alone if they make a better job at cleaning up after themselves. Lois and Manuel are surprised by Superman's decision. The workers also say that if Lois publishes her story, the authorities will shut the plant down. Superman tells Lois that she cannot publish her story. Angry, Lois and Manuel walk away, while the workers praise Superman.

Later, Superman tries to call Lois, but she does not answer. Superman decides to continue his journey, when he is suddenly met by a mysterious group of people dressed like him, calling themselves the "Superman Squad".

=== Part 6: Nebraska ===
The Superman Squad take Superman to their homebase, the Fortress of Solidarity, in the future. There, they explain that the Superman Squad is formed of many superpowered beings inspired by Superman's heroic acts. Some members include Superman's own descendants, either through blood-relation or adopted; beings that share his Kryptonian heritage, and unrelated beings who all decided to fight for justice.

The Superman Squad explain to Superman that his recent emotional crisis is not just a matter of indecision, he is actually in danger of losing himself. During the events of New Krypton, Superman recovered his people and lost it again. In the aftermath, he suffered a depression and began doubting his own ideals and principles. Making matters worse, an outside influence is reinforcing that depression. The Superman Squad are confident that Superman will move past his doubts and be the hero he was.

The Superman Squad then leave Superman in Lincoln, Nebraska, in the present, where Superman will have an encounter with a woman who will be inspired by his heroic actions. Superman then flies to Lincoln, where a devastating storm is happening. Superman saves a school bus full of children, as he is being watched by Wonder Woman. Then, Superman notices that the storm is creating a flood. Also, a tornado is coming to town, forcing Superman to choose between stopping the tornado or saving the people from the flood. Diana appears and Superman asks her to save the people while he goes to stop the tornado. Although confused, Diana agrees. Superman uses a powerful clap to create a supersonic boom that dissipates the tornado.

Meanwhile, Diana puts the people on rooftops to protect them from the flood. Suddenly, she is attacked by Lisa Jennings, who claims she ruined everything. According to Jennings, Superman was supposed to make a difficult choice: sacrifice a few to save the many. Diana interfered and Superman was never forced to choose. Just as Jennings is about to attack, Diana punches her and prepares for battle, but Jennings reminds her that there are still people at risk. Diana is forced to let Jennings go to save more people.

After the people are safe, Superman thanks Diana for helping him. Although Diana admits she wasn't here to help since she is on a quest for vengeance, she was inspired by him to act like a hero. Diana then flies away, but not before warning Superman of a woman in black. Superman thinks that the woman in black may be the one he saw in his dream in Chicago, but Superman puts those feelings aside so that he can help the panicked citizens. He is watched by Jennings, who says that Superman's descent is only beginning.

=== Part 7: Colorado ===
As Superman reaches Boulder, Colorado, he helps Super-Chief catch two criminals. After delivering the two criminals to the police, the two part ways, but not before Super-Chief tells Superman that the Manitou Stone may be Kryptonian in origin. Superman then reaches the city and a blur suddenly puts a Kryptonian outfit on him. Superman takes the Kryptonian outfit off and watches as the blur establishes Kryptonian structures across the city. Using his superhuman senses, Superman discover that the one behind all of this is the Flash, who is wearing a Kryptonian headband. Apparently, the headband is making Flash put Kryptonian structures over the city. Superman reaches the Flash and manages to take the headband off him. With the Flash free of the headband's influence, the two get the city back to normal.

The two go to a restaurant, where they see the race between Superboy and Kid Flash. Superman explains to the Flash that the headband he was wearing contains a Kryptonian sunstone. During his time in New Krypton, Superman saw an interrogation device that could extract memories directly from a prisoner's mind. The Flash believes that the device was not meant to be worn by anyone other than a Kryptonian. The Flash explains to Superman that he found the headband in a crater in Central City. As he put the headband on, his mind was overwhelmed by Kryptonian knowledge.

The Flash knew that Superman was the only one who could help him, so he made several references to the House of El while he was in Colorado. As the Flash finishes his explanation, Superman remarks that the Kryptonians believe morality to be a natural law. He tells Flash about something his adoptive father and a classmate of his told him during high school. Clark was grounded for skipping classes. He actually skipped classes to put out a fire in a neighboring county, but he did not tell anyone because he knew no one would believe him. As he was in detention, another kid was sent to detention: Lex Luthor. Clark would later figure out that Lex was sent to detention for trying to steal forty cakes from the school's bake sale. Lex had done this in revenge for not being allowed to enter a fission-powered toaster in the science fair. As Clark and Lex talked, Clark said that his father told him that "there is right and wrong in the universe, and the distinction isn't hard to make". Lex replied that the real distinction was between what works and what doesn't. Lex then left the detention room, but not before telling Clark that he didn't want to be punished for something he did. Clark would later learn that Lex was talking about pragmatism, about what's expedient instead of what's true.

As Superman and Flash leave the restaurant, Superman asks the Flash if he has wondered if he is doing the right thing by leaving a legacy behind. Flash admits that it was a little overwhelming at first, but now he is comfortable with the fact that if something happens to him, there will always be a Flash. He also says that Superman will also leave a legacy. Before the Flash leaves, Superman reminds him of what he said earlier, that he only saw a blur when he ran. Flash admits that he was joking. When he runs, he actually sees everything and everyone. Superman admits his recent feelings of self-doubt to Flash, who tells him that everything will be all right. The Flash then leaves, but not before telling Superman that he let Superman catch him and that he is still the Fastest Man Alive.

=== Part 8: Utah ===
Superman saves Helen Phelps, an archeologist, from being hit by a truck in Ogden, Utah. He takes her to her trailer near Mt. Krowak. There, she and her crew had begun a dig on the mountain to find artifacts left by a civilization that established itself in the mountain before Paleo-Indians had. Their research is being hampered by Centum Industries, a company that recently bought the mountain, wanting to use it as a radioactive waste site. Suddenly, Superman sees an S-signal in the sky, only visible to those who can see the ultraviolet end of the spectrum.

Superman flies to the source of the signal and finds Batman (Bruce Wayne), who says that they haven't had the chance to talk after his return. They remember the time when they met in Bhutran. There, shortly before they had each taken up their costumed careers, Clark and Bruce met with Terri, Clark's friend. After her father's death, Terri had become the new Rhana Bhutran. She had asked for Clark and Bruce's help to defend Bhutran from a group of Chinese soldiers led by Vandal Savage.

Savage had received information from Hassan-I-Sabbah, another immortal. Vandal believed that the inhabitants of Bhutran knew the location of Nanda Parbat, and he also believed that the monks and Rama Kushna could cure his cancer. To stop Vandal, Clark used rocks to block the pathway to Bhutran while Bruce used hypersonic speakers to summon a group of Indian flying foxes and attack the soldiers. After defeating the soldiers, Clark and Bruce expressed hope in working together again.

Superman and Batman then discuss about Superman's recent emotional crisis, Batman speculating that part of Superman's recent problems is the fact that he had never truly experienced loss before his father's recent demise and the subsequent destruction of New Krypton (the loss of his original parents having happened too long ago for him to have had any real emotional investment in their lives). Batman believes that Superman can get past his doubts. Also, Batman says that he just bought Mt. Krowak, allowing Dr. Phelps and her crew to continue their research. Superman compliments Batman for creating Batman Incorporated, and Batman replies that Superman can also create his own squad of Supermen. Batman then says that he continue to work in the shadows, while Superman will always be needed in the light. The two then part ways.

=== Part 9: Las Vegas ===
The mayor of Provo, Utah, gives Superman the key to the city. Superman then hears a frequency emitted by Jimmy Olsen's watch. Superman goes to Las Vegas, where Jimmy is, and sees that Livewire has trapped hostages within an electric field. Among them are Iron Munro and Lisa Jennings. Superman gives Jimmy the key he received from the mayor and goes to stop Livewire. He is confused on why is Livewire has returned to open villainy when she decided to begin a new honest life after helping Superman defeating the Auctioneer. Superman tries to reason with her, but Livewire attacks him with lightning bolts. Also, she transforms into pure energy and moves through the city's power grid to escape from Superman.

While Superman and Livewire fight, Jennings tries to escape the electric field, but she is shocked by the electricity and drops her Sunstone. Iron Munro tries to help her and touches the Sunstone, which gives Iron Munro visions of Superman's recent tragedies. Jennings takes the Sunstone back.

To help Superman, Jimmy calls Dr. Serling Roquette of S.T.A.R. Labs and asks her for a way to stop Livewire. Roquette tells Jimmy that Livewire's increased power is affecting her mind and that the only way to stop her is using a containment suit to dissipate Livewire's excessive power. Superman intercepts the call with his super-hearing and goes to the Fortress of Solitude. There, he finds the suit he used when he was an energy being. He takes the suit to S.T.A.R. Labs, and Roquette modifies to suit to contain Livewire.

Livewire attacks Jimmy, but he straps the key to a wire and throws it to her. This weakens Livewire and dissipates the electric field, allowing the hostages to escape. Jennings escapes in the confusion. Livewire tries to attack the hostages, but Iron Munro protects them with his invulnerability. Superman then puts the modified suit on Livewire, which returns her power levels to normal.

Livewire is arrested but she may not receive a hard sentence since she was only damaged property and there were not wounded people, and also Superman spoke in her favor. Iron Munro also chooses to use his influence in the justice department to help Livewire. Jimmy asks Superman why is he helping Livewire, and Superman answers that in America, everyone deserves a second chance.

=== Part 10: Oregon ===
Superman meets with Supergirl and Superboy in the outskirts of Newberg, Oregon. There, he informs them of his decision to stop being Superman. Shocked, Supergirl and Superboy try to talk Clark out of it, but Clark stands by his choice. Clark says that he will still help people, but in secret, just like he did in Smallville. Later, at a coffee shop in Portland, Clark calls Perry and receives news that Lois will be in Seattle tonight. He begins writing an article called "Must There Be a Superman?" The clerk introduces Clark to a Superman fan. The fan believes that Clark's article is a joke, since he, after years of writing about Superman, must have an understanding of him. The fan takes Clark for a walk across Portland to ask people about Superman.

The fan asks a boy if he fears Superman, and the boy says no, reminiscing about the time when Superman stopped an invasion of robots. Clark says that some people distrust Superman, so the fan asks a woman if she distrusts Superman. The woman says no, because one time, he stopped an anti-alien campaign led by an alien. Then, the fan asks a man if he believes that Superman kills villains, and the man says no. The man recalls one time when Superman captured a gunman who threatened to kill everyone in a school. Instead of harming the gunman, Superman handed him to the police.

Still, Clark believes that some people resent Superman for having superpowers. The fan asks an Asian-American family if they resent him for that reason, and the family says no, recalling a time when he saved their daughter's cat. Clark says that Superman can help people in secret. The fan agrees, but he also says that Superman is an inspirational figure and that allows him to help people become heroes in their own right.

Then, they listen to a news report that says that Lisa Jennings has taken Lois hostage, saying that she will kill her if Superman does not appear. Clark leaves to confront her.

=== Finale: Seattle ===
Superman arrives at Seattle and saves Lois from Jennings. He takes her to Redmond to keep her safe and the two promise to talk after the ordeal with Jennings is over. Superman fights Jennings across Seattle and asks her about her intentions. Jennings replies that she wants to make Superman suffer. To prevent their fight from causing destruction Superman activates the Lightning Door, an inter-dimensional portal that takes Superman and Jennings to the Still Zone.

There, Superman asks about Jennings why has she been following him through his journey. Jennings shows him the Sunstone her students found, saying that when Superman passed by the school she worked at, the Sunstone filled her with all of Superman's feelings of sadness and doubt. This established a mental link between her and Superman, effectively transforming Jennings into the living embodiment of his depression. The Sunstone not only gave her Kryptonian powers, but it also gave Jennings the power to alter Superman's dreams and affect the things he saw and heard.

Superman, feeling sorry for her, says that he will not let the destruction of New Krypton claim another victim. Jennings says that the Sunstone, being Kryptonian, cannot be destroyed. Superman says that his journey finally reminded him of why he became Superman in the first place. He touches the Sunstone and begins to fill it with his feelings of hope, shattering the Sunstone and rendering Jennings unconscious. Superman takes her out of the Still Zone and returns to normal space and time.

After delivering Jennings to a hospital, Superman returns to Lois and apologizes for making her cancel the article about the factory, but Lois replies that she wrote it anyway. With their love rekindled, the two kiss and return home.

In the Fortress of Solidarity, a female member of the Superman Squad reveals to two other members that after his journey, Superman gave signal watches to Super-Chief, Steel, Iron Munro, Livewire, Superboy, and Supergirl, forming the Supermen of America. The Sunstone shards returned to normal space and time, falling in several places across history. The shards infused many individuals with Superman's powers and ideals, becoming heroes. The female member reveals that she is Lisa Jennings, inspired by Superman.
