= Superman: World of New Krypton =

Comic book

- Variant incentive cover to Superman: World of New Krypton #1, art by José Ladrönn.

Publication information
- Publisher: DC Comics
- Schedule: Monthly
- Format: Limited series
- Genre: Superhero
- Publication date: March 2009 - March 2010
- No. of issues: 12
- Main character(s): Superman; Alura; General Zod

Creative team
- Created by: James Robinson; Greg Rucka; Pete Woods
- Written by: James Robinson; Greg Rucka
- Artist: Pete Woods

Superman: World of New Krypton is a twelve-issue American comic book limited series produced by DC Comics. It is written by the team of James Robinson and Greg Rucka, who at the time of this publication are the current writers of the Superman and Action Comics titles, and illustrated by artist Pete Woods.

World of New Krypton takes place after the crossover Superman: New Krypton, in which approximately 100,000 Kryptonians and their city of Kandor are saved by Superman from the alien Brainiac and restored to existence. After spending time on Earth, the Kryptonians raise the city into space and form the planet New Krypton in Earth's solar system. It then leads into Superman: Last Stand of New Krypton.

== Publication history ==
Originally, this series was solicited to be written by Andrew Kreisberg, but just before the first issue was to be released, Kreisberg dropped out of the title to focus on his work as a writer on the television series Fringe, as well as his other comic commitments to Green Arrow/Black Canary. He was replaced by James Robinson and Greg Rucka, who are simultaneously writing Superman and Action Comics, the normal Superman titles, without the regular title character.

For the majority of 2009, World of New Krypton was the only DC Comics title that Superman appeared in. Action Comics and Superman new feature characters for the duration of World of New Krypton, with the new incarnation of Nightwing and Flamebird in Action Comics and the Guardian and Mon-El in Superman.

Due to the expansive nature of DC's 2009 summer event Blackest Night, World of New Krypton co-writer Greg Rucka stated that "Superman's on Earth in August". This ended up being foreshadowing for the tie-in mini-series Blackest Night: Superman, which was written by James Robinson and penciled by former Action Comics artist Eddy Barrows. Superman also appears in the main Blackest Night title by Geoff Johns and Ivan Reis in a supporting role, with the main characters in that series being Green Lantern and The Flash.

The events of the series lead into the major War of the Supermen storyline.

== Plot ==
Superman agrees to a deal with his aunt Alura that he renounce his allegiance to Earth and sever ties there to live on New Krypton with his people. He does not truthfully renounce all ties to his adopted home, as he tells his wife Lois Lane. He instructs his friend Mon-El to "take over for him" and has conversations with the Guardian and Jimmy Olsen before disembarking for New Krypton. Superman intends to live amongst the Kryptonians in the hopes of easing tensions with Earth and teaching them to use their powers responsibly.

When he arrives on the planet, he receives a lukewarm welcome from the Kryptonian military. He is openly welcomed by Alura, who asks him to pick a guild with which to be employed while on the planet. While he is deciding this, it is revealed to him that General Zod has been released from the Phantom Zone and is lauded as a great leader and hero. He is given his previous job as the head of the Kryptonian military, and Superman finds this alarming. Zod maintains that he no longer has any reason to hate his fellow Kryptonians, as they have now accepted him. When Alura asks Superman which guild he has chosen, he admits that he is not comfortable with any, even going so far as to liken the Kryptonians' working conditions to slavery. Superman is assigned to be a member of the Military guild. Zod puts Superman in charge of the Red Shard, a unit responsible for law enforcement and civic defense.

The Green Lantern Corps visit New Krypton and are surprised to find that the Kryptonians are building a fleet of space ships. Tyr-Van tells them that they are billed as a security deterrent, but Hal Jordan believes Zod is planning something. Superman cannot vouch for Zod, but he asks Hal to trust him.

Superman tells Lieutenant Asha Del-Nar to ignore Zod's orders to kill Val-Ty, a fugitive they are chasing. Val-Ty is captured, but Zod orders Superman and Asha to be taken into custody and charged with treason for disobeying him. Zod dismisses charges against Nar, but asks the council to find Superman guilty of treason by his own admission. Superman is eventually spared and freed.

New Krypton is carrying out Operation: Callisto, a plan to disengage one of Jupiter's moons to act as New Krypton's moon. The plan is going as planned until they encounter a Thanagarian battle group. When the pilot ship guiding Callisto is destroyed, the explosion affects the sunstone crystal inserted into Callisto's core, causing it to fall towards New Krypton. Superman explains that New Krypton bears no hostility towards Thanagar and that he has ordered all Kryptonian forces to withdraw. The Thanagarians slow Callisto's descent, with Superman placing it into its intended orbit.

Wing-Master Vetalla Dae, a Thanagarian Wing-Master, is instructed to open diplomatic channels between New Krypton and Thanagar. The Interim Council agrees but the session is interrupted by Jemm. Jemm starts a fight in the council, but eventually agrees to stop the fight and address the council. He chides the Kryptonians for their arrogance and feeling of entitlement and warned that they will be watching.

Adam Strange arrives on New Krypton to protest their establishment of diplomatic accord with Thanagar and discovers that Councillor Mar-Li has been killed. Superman convinces the council to allow Strange to leave if he can prove his innocence by solving Mar-Li's murder. An examination of the room revealed that the killer utilized a terraforming device used by the Labour Guild, with Mar-Li having been opposed to admitting a labour guild member into the council. Superman deduces that Councillor Wri-Qin is the mastermind, having killed his co-conspirators and Mar-Li to have sole profit from the council. Superman and his Red Shard team managed to capture Wri-Qin into custody.

Zod informs Superman that the council has granted the Labour Guild a seat on the council and that Tyr-Van has been named his representative. As Superman contemplates his contributions to Krypton, Zod commends him for being instrumental in changing the foundation of society. As they conversed, a Brainiac robot suddenly appears.

== Collected editions ==
- Superman: New Krypton Vol. 3 (144 pages, collecting World of New Krypton #1-5)
- Superman: Codename Patriot (144 pages, collecting Superman's Pal Jimmy Olsen Special #2, Superman #691, Supergirl #44, Action Comics #880, Superman: World of New Krypton #6)
- Superman: New Krypton Vol. 4 (192 pages, collecting World of New Krypton #6-12)
