= Eddy Barrows =

Brazilian comic book artist

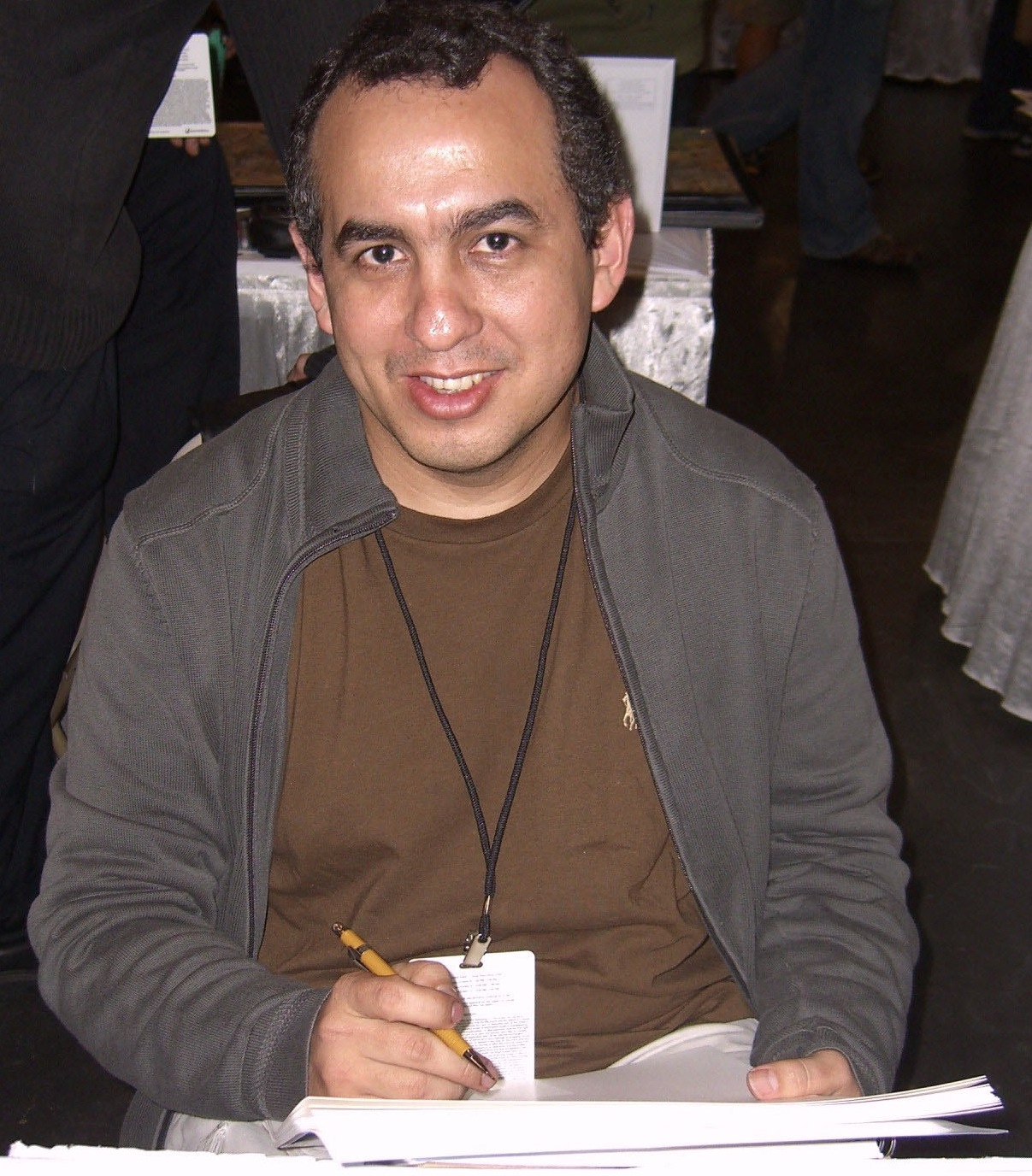
- Barrows at the New York Comic Con in Manhattan, October 9, 2010
- Born: Eduardo Barros Belém do Pará, Brazil
- Areas: Penciller, Inker
- Notable works: 52; Action Comics; Birds of Prey; Countdown to Adventure; Superman; Teen Titans

Eduardo Barros (born October 29, 1974) is a Brazilian comic book artist, better known by his pen name of Eddy Barrows. He is best known for his work at DC Comics on such titles as Birds of Prey, Countdown to Adventure, Action Comics, Superman, Teen Titans, and 52.

== Early life ==
Eduardo Barros was born on in Belém do Pará, Brazil. He and his parents moved to Belo Horizonte, Minas Gerais when he was two years old, and grew up in that city. When he was seven years old, Barrows was struck by a truck while playing on the sidewalk. In a 2024 interview, Barrows related:

I spent three days fighting for my life, and during that whole year that followed, I remained in bed, doing lots of physiotherapy, lots of meds and exams. Going to the doctors was a very regular thing. And it was during that time that Superman came to my life, reading Action Comics...Kal-El became a good friend of mine, making my days better. His adventures and his behavior were things that stuck with me! Reading his stories were the highlight of my days, for a 7-year-old recovering from an accident like I was.

Barrows would eventually work on both the Superman and Action Comics titles. Barrows' mother introduced him to Turma da Mônica, a Brazilian comic by Mauricio de Sousa, as well as books published by the Disney company. As she read these books to him, Barrows fell in love with comics, and eventually took up drawing as well.

While never having gone to school specifically for art, Barrows studied animation for two to three years before becoming a working artist.

His favorite character is Chico Bento.

== Career ==
When Barrows was 22 years old, he began working by providing illustrations for school books, children's books, and publicity agencies. During this time, Barrows gave up comics for a while. When he was 24, he returned to comics by doing tests for Art & Comics Studios. When he got approval, he began training for six months.

In the 1990s, Barrows broke in the comics industry by working on a tie-in comic for the then-World Wrestling Federation on Stone Cold Steve Austin at Chaos Comics, of which he illustrated six issues. In 2001, Barrows believed that he needed to practice and improve his work, he had contact with Romulo Soares, from Lynx Studio, who was one of the contacts in Brazil for Glass House Graphics, an American studio that represented Art & Comics in the USA (at that time the contract between these companies had ended), and from that contact Barrows began tests and samples for a long period already working with Lynx Studio, after this test period, Barrows started doing independent projects with Lynx Studio, until in 2003 the great opportunity arose in a story arc in GI Joe: Frontline (Image) and Cobra Reborn (Image), there were 6 magazines made with Lynx Studio, in addition to of other independent works, at the end of that arc, and because he did not have an exclusive contract with Lynx Studio, Joe Prado called Barrows directly, convincing him to go back to work with Art & Comics in 2004.

After illustrating a comic book for Avatar Press, he submitted three test pages to DC Comics, after which they hired him to work on Bloodhound. Following that, Barrows contributed to Batman: Secret Files Villains 2005 and three issues of Birds of Prey. From there, Barrows became an artist on the weekly series 52 and teamed with writer Gail Simone on The All-New Atom. After leaving Atom, editor Eddie Berganza offered Countdown To Adventure.

Barrows' took over penciling duties with a year-long run on Teen Titans with writer Sean McKeever, as well as being teamed with writer Greg Rucka for Action Comics. As of 2010, Barrows has become one of the main artists for DC's Superman family of titles, collaborating with writer James Robinson on the Superman tie-in miniseries to Blackest Night, illustrating the main story in Free Comic Book Day's War of the Supermen zero-issue, and providing the covers to the main War of the Supermen series.

Barrows began his run as artist on DC's Superman, with writer J. Michael Straczynski for the writer's run on the main Superman title, beginning with the "Grounded" story arc with a ten-page entry in issue #700 (August 2010).

In April 2024, it was announced that Barrows would return to Action Comics beginning with issue #1,067, published July 10.

== Bibliography ==
=== DC Comics ===
- 52 #8, 12, 18, 22, 44, 49, 52 (2006–2007)
- Action Comics (Nightwing and Flamebird) #875–876 (2009)
- Atom vol. 2 #4–6, 9–11 (2006–2007)
- Batman Villains Secret Files and Origins #1 (2005)
- Birds of Prey #85, 87–88 (along with Joe Bennett) (2006)
- Blackest Night:
  - JSA miniseries, #1–3 (among other artists) (2010)
  - Superman miniseries, #1–3 (2009)
  - Tales of The Corps 3-issue miniseries, #2 (2009)
- Checkmate vol. 2 #14 (along with Joe Bennett) (2007)
- Countdown to Adventure miniseries, #1–3 (2007–2008)
- Detective Comics #934–935, 939–940, 944, 946, 950, 965–966, 977, 981, Annual #1 (2016–2018)
- Firestorm vol. 3, #21 (along with Jamal Igle), #22 (2006)
- Green Lantern vol. 4, #41–42 (along with Philip Tan) (2009)
- Justice League of America vol. 4, #34 (along with Ardian Syaf) (2009)
- Martian Manhunter vol. 4 #1–6 (2015)
- Nightwing vol. 3 #0–3, 5–10, 15–16 (2011–2013)
- Suicide Squad vol. 4 #11–15 (backup stories, 2016–2017)
- Superman vol. 1 #700–701, 705, 709 (2010–2011)
- Superman vol. 3 #23–24 (2013)
- Superman 80-Page Giant (Superboy feature, 2011)
- Superman: War of the Supermen miniseries, #0 (2010)
- Teen Titans vol. 3 #53–54, 56–57, 59–60, 62–63, 65–66, 68 (2008–2009)
- Teen Titans vol. 4 #17–22 (2013)
