= Jamal Igle =

American comic book artist

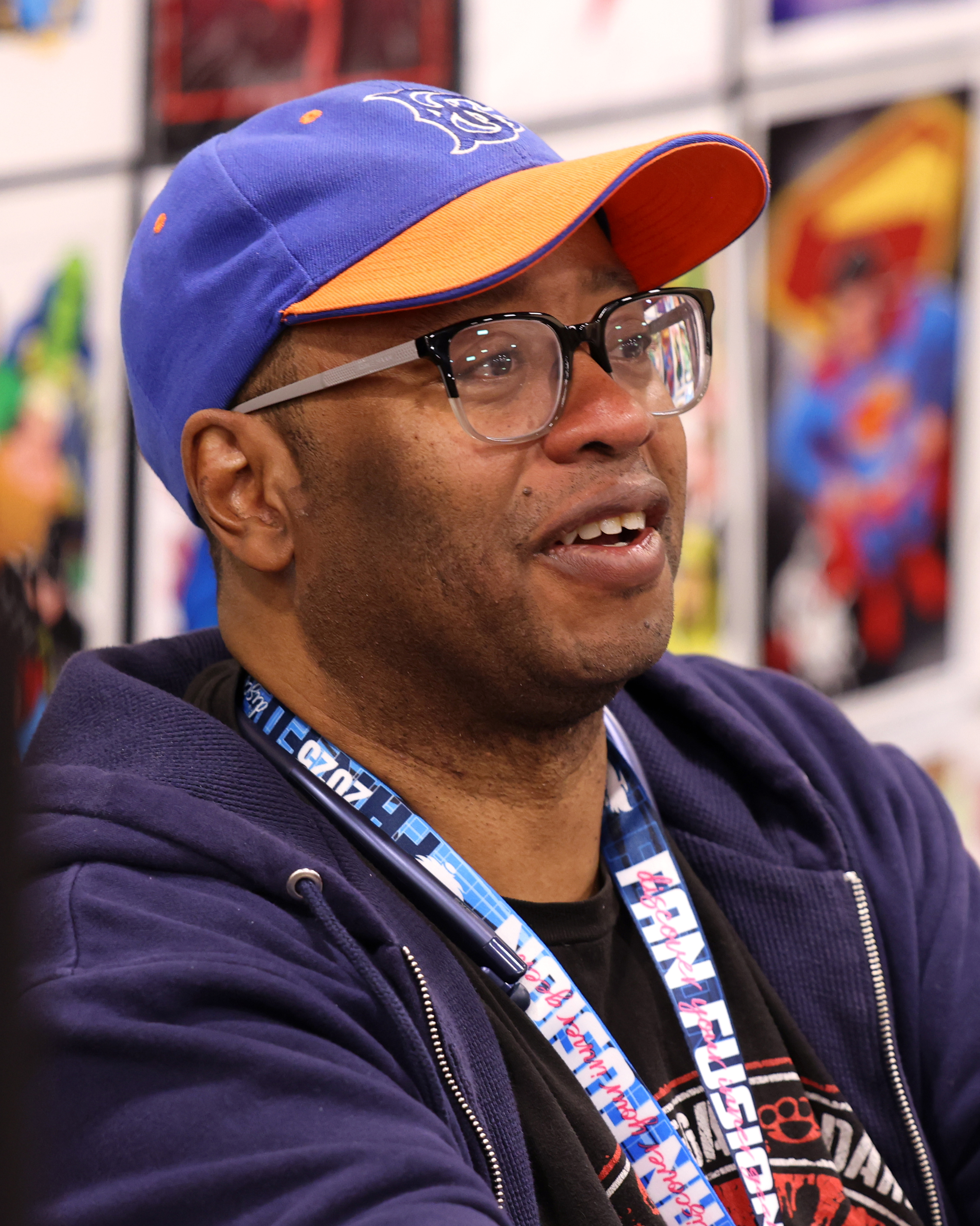
- Igle in 2025
- Born: Jamal Yaseem Igle
- Areas: Writer, Penciller, Inker, Editor, Colourist
- Notable works: Supergirl (vol. 4); Firestorm (vol. 3)
- Awards: 2011 Inkpot Award for Achievement in Comic Art

Jamal Yaseem Igle is an American comic book artist, editor, art director, marketing executive and animation storyboard artist. The creator of the comic book series Molly Danger he is also known for his pencilling, inking and coloring work on books such as Supergirl, The Ray, and Firestorm.

== Career ==
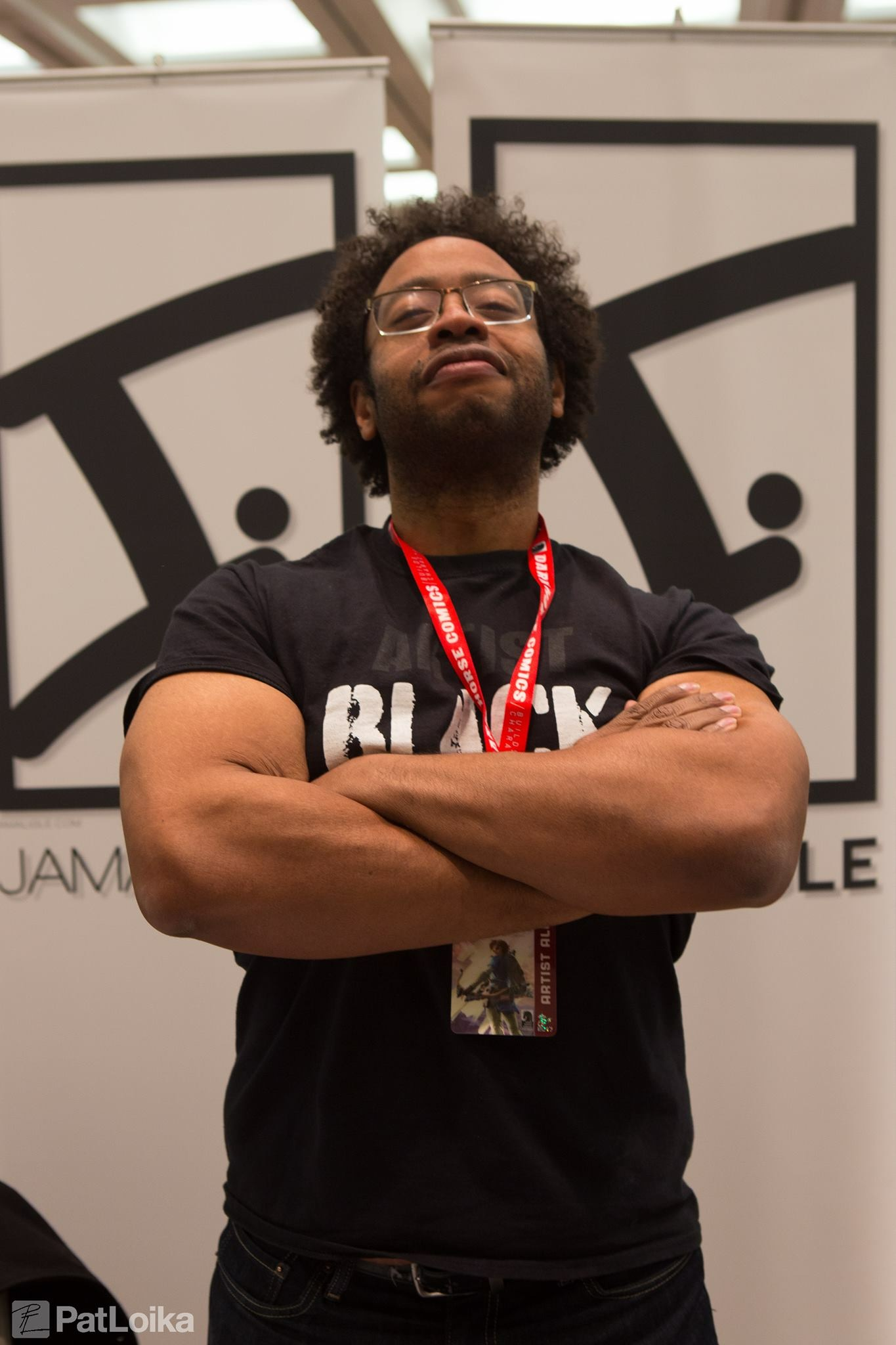
Igle at the Emerald City Comic Con in 2017

Igle decided he wanted to be a professional comic book artist at the age of 14. Igle attained his first job in comics at 17, as an intern at DC Comics, while still attending the High School of Art and Design. He later studied at the School of Visual Arts. Most of his formal art education centered upon classical illustrators such as Bob Peak, Norman Rockwell, and John Singer Sargent. After college, Igle worked as a junior art director at an advertisement agency and in a marketing company. Igle's first break as an artist was with a now-defunct publisher called Majestic Entertainment in 1993. He built his resume working for a number of small publishers for years until about 1999, when he left comics for a while to work at Sony Animation. Igle spent several months as a storyboard artist for several CGI animated series such as Max Steel and Roughnecks: Starship Troopers Chronicles. It was during his time at Sony that he received a call from editor Bobbie Chase at Marvel Comics to work on New Warriors with Jay Faerber. He has been working in comics ever since. Igle has worked in books ranging from The Narrative of the Life of Frederick Douglass, the all-ages action miniseries Race Against Time as well as fill-in issues in mainstream titles such as Green Lantern, G.I. Joe, Martian Manhunter, and Supergirl. With writer Jay Faerber has done several works: a four issue run on New Warriors and an Iron Fist/Wolverine miniseries for Marvel Comics, and Venture, a short-lived creator-owned series for Image Comics. He became the regular artist of DC Comics' ongoing Firestorm series, beginning with issue #8 (December 2004). In November 2006, DC Comics announced that Igle would be taking over as series artist of Nightwing.

Igle has worked on several projects outside of the United States including the Army of Angels graphic novel for Humanoids Publishing/DC Comics and Perry Rhodan for The Perry Rhodan company in Germany.

In December 2005, Jamal signed an exclusive contract with DC Comics, which was publicly announced on January 10, 2006. As part of the contract's announcement, DC Editor Steve Wacker described Jamal as a "triple threat", stating "Jamal has the best combination in an artist: he's scary talented, super reliable, and one of the nicest guys in the business." Igle was also honored at the 40th Anniversary edition of San Diego Comic-Con with the Inkpot Award for Achievement in Comic Art.

Igle was the artist on the Ray title that debuted in September 2011 as part of the DC's New 52 relaunch.

On January 2, 2012, Igle announced the end of his DC Comics exclusive contract on his personal blog.

In November 2013, Igle began working at Action Lab Comics, serving as co-director of Marketing and Press Relations until March 2015, when was promoted to Vice President of Marketing. He announced he was leaving the company in October 2016, and was working on the next installment of Molly Danger, which would remain part of that publisher's imprint for younger readers.

== Other work ==
In July 2006, Jamal joined the staff of the Art Students League of New York.

In 2022, Igle joined the staff of the School of Visual Arts, as an instructor in the BFA Comics department, beginning with that year's Fall semester.

== Art style ==
Regarding the influences on his art style, Igle has stated:

"Well, that's hard to say because they are so varied. I'm not only a comics fan but a fan of fine art, film, television, and theater so my influences include Steve Rude, Al Williamson, Alan Davis, Brian Bolland, Dave Stevens, Mark Shultz [sic?], Joseph Clemet Cole [sic?], Louise Gordon, Sam Raimi, Tim Burton, Audu Paden and the list keeps growing. I'm influenced by everyone I see and talk to. I'm a student of the world and I learn and grow everyday.

== Personal life ==
Igle and his wife Karine have a daughter named Catherine. As of November 2012, they live in Brooklyn.

== Bibliography ==
=== Crusade ===
- Shi: The Way of the Warrior #8 (1996)
- Shi: Kaidan #1
- Atomik Angels #1
- Tomoe/Witchblade: Fire Sermon (1996)

=== Dark Horse Comics ===
- The Terminator: Enemy of My Enemy six issue series (2014)
- Dudley Datson and the Forever Machine #1–3 (with Scott Snyder, reprint of Comixology digital series, 2024)

=== Dark Angel ===
- Race against Time #1-3
- Blackjack: Blood and Honor

=== DC ===
- Action Comics #900 (among other artists) (2011)
- Countdown to Final Crisis #21, 4 (2007–08)
- Countdown: Search for Ray Palmer, miniseries, #1 (2007)
- Famous first: Green Lantern (2002)
- Golden Age Secret Files (Dr. Sivana) (2001)
- Green Lantern, vol. 3, #52 (among other artists) (1994); #146, 157, 174, Secret Files #3 (2002–04)
- Green Lantern Corps #18 (2007)
- Impulse #58 (2000)
- Kobalt #7 (1994)
- Martian Manhunter #36 (2001)
- Sensation Comics featuring Wonder Woman #11 (2015)
- Supergirl, vol. 3, #71 (2002)
- Supergirl, vol. 4, #34-40, 42–46, 50-59 (2008–11)
- Superman # 713-714 (2011)
- Superman: War of the Supermen, miniseries, #1 (2010)
- Firestorm, vol. 3, #8-10,12-21,23-32 (2004–06)
- Nightwing #129-131, 133-134 (2007)
- Teen Titans vol. 5, # 52, 55 (2007–08)
- Tangent: Superman's Reign, miniseries, #2-6 (2008)
- The Ray Miniseries, #1-4 (2011–2012)
- Wonder Woman: Our Worlds at War (among other artists) (2001)
- World's Finest, miniseries,(Supergirl & Batgirl) #3 (2009)
- Zatanna #11, 13-15 (2011)

=== Marvel ===
- Daredevil/Shi: Blind Faith (1997)
- New Warriors, vol. 2, #7-10 (2000)
- Iron Fist and Wolverine, miniseries, #1-4 (2000–01)
- Iron Man, vol. 3, #44 (along with Keron Grant; 2001)
- Marvel Age Spider-Man #14

=== Other publishers ===
- G.I. Joe #8, 10
- Noble Causes #2 (Image, 2002)
- Trinity Angels #10-11 (along with other artists) (Acclaim, 1998)
- Venture, miniseries, #1-4 (Image, 2003)
- Gateway Legends #2 (Originally penciled in 1996 for Living Legends Entertainment) (Gateway Comics, 2012)
- KISS #1-2, covers for issues 5 and 6 (IDW publishing, 2012)
- Molly Danger: Book One (Action Lab Entertainment, 2013)
- BLACK 1-6 (Black Mask Studios, 2017)
- The Wrong Earth, #1-6 (Ahoy Comics, 2018)
- The Wrong Earth: Night and Day ,#1-6 (Ahoy Comics, 2020)
- The Wrong Earth: Dead Ringers ,#1-5 (Ahoy Comics, 2024)

Preceded by Karl Kerschl	New Warriors artist 1999–2000	Succeeded by Skottie Young
Preceded by ChrisCross	Firestorm artist 2004–2007	Succeeded by Ken Lashley
Preceded by Dan Jurgens	Nightwing artist 2007	Succeeded by Jon Bosco
Preceded by Drew Johnson	Supergirl artist 2008—2010	Succeeded by Bernard Chang
Preceded by Cliff Chiang	Zatanna artist 2011	Succeeded by Victor Ibanez
