= Action Comics =

American comic book

- Action Comics #1 (June 1938), the debut of Superman. Art by Joe Shuster.

Publication information
- Publisher: DC Comics
- Schedule: List: (vol. 1) Monthly: #1–600 Weekly: #601–642 Monthly: #643–904 (vol. 2) Monthly: #1–52 (vol. 1 cont.) Twice-monthly: #957–999 Monthly: #1000-Present
- Format: Ongoing series
- Genre: Superhero
- Publication date: List: (vol. 1) June 1938 – October 2011 (vol. 2) November 2011 – July 2016 (vol. 1 cont.) August 2016–present
- No. of issues: List: (vol. 1) 906 (#1–904 plus issues numbered 0 and 1,000,000) and 13 Annuals (vol. 2) 57 (#1–52 plus issues numbered 0 and 23.1 through 23.4) and 3 Annuals (vol. 1 cont.) 100 (#957–1056) and 2 Annuals (as of August 2023 cover date)
- Main character: Superman

Creative team
- Written by: List: Vol. 1: Jerry Siegel (1-61, 69, 72-77, 81-83, 87, 97-98, 101, 104-105, 259, 261, 264-287, 289-291, 299, 322, 326, 338, 341, 351-352, 360, 373, 377, 388, 544) Donald Clough Cameron (58, 61–68, 70–71, 77–83, 85–86, 88–90, 99–100, 102, 107, 109, 119, 148, 151, 192) Robert Bernstein (225, 234, 248-249, 251-252, 255, 257-262, 276, 279, 281, 283-284, 286-287, 291, 306, 311-312, 346, 373) Otto Binder (127–146, 182, 195, 200, 202, 204–260, 262–265, 267–268, 270–273, 317, 320, 323, 326, 331, 335–337, 341–342, 344, 349–353, 357, 359, 361–364, 367–369, 371–372, 374–377) Jim Shooter (339–340, 342–345, 348, 361, 378, 380–382, 384, 451–45) Elliot S. Maggin (420–421, 424–431, 433–437, 440–441, 443–452, 455–460, 568, 571, 642) Cary Bates (354, 356, 358, 366–370, 383–390, 392, 401, 403, 405, 407–408, 410, 412, 414–416, 419, 421–423, 425–428, 430–435, 438–439, 441–442, 444–446, 450, 453–454, 456, 460–466, 468–476, 480–485, 487–499, 501–512, 544, 548–549, 581) Martin Pasko (438–439, 442, 447–448, 453–454, 465, 468, 500, 524, 601–612, 615–634) Len Wein George Pérez John Byrne (584-600, Annual #1) Roger Stern (601–642, 644–657, 659–665, 667–693, 696–700, 737, Annual #2–3) Marv Wolfman (513–516, 525–536, 539–546, 551–554, 556, 613–618, 627–628, 778) Joe Kelly Kurt Busiek Gail Simone Greg Rucka vol. 2: Grant Morrison (0, 1-18) Andy Diggle (19-21) Tony S. Daniel (20-21) Scott Lobdell (22-23) Mike Johnson (24) Greg Pak (25-50) Aaron Kuder (41-50) Peter J. Tomasi (51-52) vol. 1 cont.: Dan Jurgens (957-984, 987-1000) Rob Williams (985-986) Brian Michael Bendis (1000-1028) Phillip Kennedy Johnson (1029-1060) Jason Aaron (1061-1063) Joshua Williamson (1050, 1064-1066) Gail Simone (1067-1069) Mark Waid (1070-1081, 1087-) G. Willow Wilson (1085-1086)
- Penciller: List: vol. 1: Joe Shuster Wayne Boring Al Plastino Jim Mooney Ross Andru Curt Swan Dick Dillin Dick Giordano Mike Grell Kurt Schaffenberger Gil Kane Irv Novick John Byrne George Pérez Stuart Immonen Bob McLeod Pasqual Ferry Talent Caldwell Ivan Reis Joe Prado Ed Benes Adam Kubert Pete Woods Gary Frank Eddy Barrows vol. 2: Rags Morales Tony Daniel Andy Kubert Aaron Kuder
- Inker: List: vol. 1: Murphy Anderson Tex Blaisdell Frank Chiaramonte Dick Giordano Bob Oksner Brett Breeding Denis Rodier Ty Templeton vol. 2: Rick Bryant John Dell

Collected editions
- Superman Chronicles Vol 1: ISBN 1-4012-0764-2
- Superman Chronicles Vol 2: ISBN 1-4012-1215-8
- Superman in the Forties: ISBN 1-4012-0457-0
- Archives Vol 1: ISBN 1-56389-335-5
- Archives Vol 2: ISBN 1-56389-426-2
- Archives Vol 3: ISBN 1-56389-710-5
- Archives Vol 4: ISBN 1-4012-0408-2
- Archives Vol 5: ISBN 1-4012-1188-7

Action Comics is an American comic book/magazine series that introduced Superman, one of the first major superhero characters. The publisher was originally known as Detective Comics Inc., which later merged into National Comics Publications (later National Periodical Publications), before taking on its current name of DC Comics. Its original incarnation ran from 1938 to 2011 and stands as one of the longest-running comic books with consecutively numbered issues. The second volume of Action Comics beginning with Issue #1 ran from 2011 to 2016. Action Comics returned to its original numbering beginning with Issue #957 (Aug. 2016).

== Publication history ==
=== The Golden Age ===
Jerry Siegel and Joe Shuster saw their creation, Superman (also known as Kal-El, originally Kal-L), launched in Action Comics #1 on April 18, 1938 (cover dated June), an event which began the Golden Age of Comic Books. Siegel and Shuster had tried for years to find a publisher for their Superman character—conceived initially as a newspaper strip. Superman was originally a bald madman created by Siegel and Shuster who used his telepathic abilities to wreak havoc on humanity. He appeared in Siegel and Shuster's fanzine Science Fiction. Siegel then commented, "What if this Superman was a force for good instead of evil?" The writer and artist had worked on several features for National Allied Publications' other titles such as Slam Bradley in Detective Comics. They were asked to contribute a feature for National's newest publication. They submitted Superman for consideration. After re-pasting the sample newspaper strips they had prepared into comic book page format, National decided to make Superman the cover feature of their new magazine. After seeing the published first issue, publisher Harry Donenfeld dismissed the featured strip as ridiculous. He ordered it never to be on the cover of the series. Subsequent reports of the first issue's strong sales and follow up investigations revealed that Superman was the reason. Thus, the character returned to the covers, becoming a permanent presence in issue 19 onward.

Initially, Action Comics was an anthology title featuring several other stories in addition to the Superman story. Zatara, a magician, was one of the other characters who had his own stories in early issues. There was the hero Tex Thompson, who eventually became Mr. America and later the Americommando. Vigilante enjoyed a lengthy run in this series. Sometimes stories of a more humorous nature were included, such as those of Hayfoot Henry, a policeman who talked in rhyme. The series saw the introduction of several characters and themes that would become longstanding elements of the Superman mythos. Lois Lane made her debut in the first issue with Superman. An unnamed "office boy" with a bow tie makes a brief appearance in the story "Superman's Phony Manager" published in Action Comics #6 (November 1938), which is claimed to be Jimmy Olsen's first appearance by several reference sources.

New superpowers depicted for the first time for the character included X-ray vision and super-hearing in Issue #11 (April 1939) and telescopic vision and super-breath in Issue #20 (January 1940).

Luthor, a villain who became Superman's arch-enemy, was introduced in Issue #23 (April 1940). The original Toyman was created by writer Don Cameron and artist Ed Dobrotka in Issue #64 (September 1943). By 1942, artist Wayne Boring, who had previously been one of Shuster's assistants, had become a major artist on Superman.

=== The Silver Age ===
Under editor Mort Weisinger, the Action Comics title saw a further expansion of the Superman mythology. Writer Jerry Coleman and Wayne Boring created the Fortress of Solitude in Issue #241 (June 1958) and Otto Binder and Al Plastino debuted the villain Brainiac and the Bottle City of Kandor in the next issue the following month.

Gradually, the size of the issues was decreased. The publisher was reluctant to raise the cover price from the original 10 cents and reduced the number of stories. For a while, Congo Bill and Tommy Tomorrow were the two features in addition to Superman. Writer Robert Bernstein and artist Howard Sherman revamped the "Congo Bill" backup feature in Issue #248 (January 1959) in a story wherein the character gained the ability to swap bodies with a gorilla and his strip was renamed Congorilla. The introduction of Supergirl by Otto Binder and Al Plastino occurred in Issue #252 (May 1959). Following this debut appearance, Supergirl adopted the secret identity of an orphan "Linda Lee" and made Midvale Orphanage her base of operations. In Action Comics #261 (February 1960), her pet cat Streaky was introduced by Jerry Siegel and Jim Mooney. Supergirl joined the Legion of Super-Heroes in Issue #276. She acted for three years as Superman's "secret weapon", until her existence was revealed in Action Comics #285 (January 1962). In the view of comics historian Les Daniels, artist Curt Swan became the definitive artist of Superman in the early 1960s with a "new look" to the character that replaced Wayne Boring's version. Bizarro World first appeared in the story "The World of Bizarros!" in Issue #262 (April 1960). Writer Jim Shooter created the villain the Parasite in Action Comics #340 (Aug. 1966).

=== The Bronze Age ===
Mort Weisinger retired from DC in 1970 and his final issue of Action Comics was Issue #392 (September 1970). Murray Boltinoff became the title's editor until Issue #418. Metamorpho was the backup feature in Issues #413–418 after which the character had a brief run as the backup in World's Finest Comics. Julius Schwartz became the editor of the series with Issue #419 (December 1972) which also introduced the Human Target by Len Wein and Carmine Infantino in the backup feature. The Green Arrow and the Black Canary became a backup feature in #421 and ran through #458, initially rotating with the Human Target and the Atom.

A new version of the Toyman was created by Cary Bates and Curt Swan in Issue #432 (February 1974). Issues #437 (July 1974) and #443 (Jan. 1975) of the series were in the 100 Page Super Spectacular format. Martin Pasko wrote Issue #500 (October 1979) which featured a history of the Superman canon as it existed at the time and was published in the Dollar Comics format.

The superheroine Vixen made her first appearance in Action Comics #521 (July 1981). To mark the 45th anniversary of the series, Lex Luthor and Brainiac were both given an updated appearance in Issue #544 (June 1983). Lex Luthor dons his war suit for the first time in the story "Luthor Unleashed!" and Brainiac's appearance changes from the familiar green-skinned android to the metal skeletal-like robot in the story "Rebirth!". Keith Giffen's Ambush Bug character made appearances in Issues #560, #563, and #565. Action Comics #579, written by Jean-Marc Lofficier and drawn by Giffen, featured an homage to Asterix where Superman and Jimmy Olsen are drawn back in time to a small village of indomitable Gauls. Schwartz ended his run as editor of the series with Issue #583 (September 1986) which featured the second part of the "Whatever Happened to the Man of Tomorrow?" story by Alan Moore and Curt Swan.

=== The Modern Age ===
Following the events of Crisis on Infinite Earths, writer/artist John Byrne relaunched the Superman franchise in The Man of Steel limited series in 1986. Action Comics became a team-up title with Issue #584 (January 1987) featuring Superman and the New Teen Titans. Other costars during this period included the Phantom Stranger, the New Gods, Etrigan the Demon, Hawkman and Hawkwoman, the Green Lantern Corps, the Metal Men, Superboy, Big Barda, Mister Miracle, Booster Gold, the Martian Manhunter, the Spectre, Lois Lane and Lana Lang, Checkmate, Wonder Woman, and the Man-Bat. The first Action Comics Annual was published in 1987 and featured Superman teaming with Batman in a story written by Byrne and drawn by Arthur Adams. A DC Comics Bonus Book was included in Issue #599 (April 1988).

From May 24, 1988 – March 14, 1989, the publication frequency was changed to weekly, the title changed to Action Comics Weekly, and the series became an anthology. Prior to its launch, DC cancelled its ongoing Green Lantern Corps title and made Green Lantern and his adventures exclusive to Action Comics Weekly.

The rest of these issues featured rotating serialized stories of other DC heroes, sometimes as try-outs that led to their own limited or ongoing series. Characters with featured stories in the run included Black Canary, Blackhawk, Captain Marvel, Catwoman, Deadman, Nightwing, Phantom Lady, Phantom Stranger, the Secret Six, Speedy, and Wild Dog. Titles spun off from Action Comics at this time included a Catwoman miniseries and a Blackhawk ongoing, in both cases by the same creative teams that worked on the weekly serials. During and after Action Comics Weekly's run, two Green Lantern Specials were published in late 1988 and the second in spring 1989, the latter special wrapping up the storylines from the Green Lantern serials in Action Comics Weekly. Each issue featured a two-page Superman serial, a feature that, according to an editorial in the first weekly issue, was intended as a homage to the Superman newspaper strips of the past.

The final issue of the weekly was originally intended to feature a book-length encounter between Clark Kent and Hal Jordan by writer Neil Gaiman. While Gaiman's story primarily teamed up Green Lantern and Superman, it also featured other characters from Action Comics Weekly, including the Blackhawks (in flashback), Deadman, and the Phantom Stranger. The story ran counter to DC editorial policy at the time as it portrayed Hal Jordan and Clark Kent as old friends who knew each other's secret identities. This was not considered canon in 1989 and Gaiman was unwilling to change this aspect of the story (as each serial in ACW was edited by different editors, continuity was not being maintained by DC editorial). The story was pulled and a different story, written by Elliot S. Maggin, was run. Gaiman's story was finally published as a one-shot in Green Lantern/Superman: Legend of the Green Flame in November 2000.

The Action Comics Weekly experiment lasted only until the beginning of March 1989 and after a short break, Issue #643 (July 1989) brought the title back onto a monthly schedule. Writer/artist George Pérez took over the title and was joined by scripter Roger Stern the following month.

As writer of the series, Stern contributed to such storylines as "Panic in the Sky" and "The Death of Superman". He created the Eradicator in Action Comics Annual #2 and later incorporated the character into the "Reign of the Supermen" story arc beginning in The Adventures of Superman #500. The Eradicator then took over Action Comics as "the Last Son of Krypton" in Issue #687 (June 1993).

Stern wrote the 1991 story wherein Clark Kent finally revealed his identity as Superman to Lois Lane.

Cover of Action Comics #800 (April 2003), a modern take on the cover of Action Comics #1, art by Drew Struzan

Several major Superman storylines crossed over with Action Comics including "Emperor Joker" in 2000 and "Our Worlds at War" in 2001. John Byrne returned to Action Comics for Issues #827–835 working with writer Gail Simone in 2005–2006.

After the "One Year Later" company-wide storyline, Action Comics had a crossover arc with the Superman series, entitled "Up, Up and Away!" which told of Clark Kent attempting to protect Metropolis without his powers until eventually regaining them.

The "Last Son" storyline was written by Geoff Johns and Richard Donner, the director of the 1978 film Superman, and was pencilled by Adam Kubert. This story introduces the original character, Christopher Kent, and adapts Ursa and Non, who were created for Superman, into the main DC Universe continuity. Issue #851 (August 2007) was presented in 3-D.

Starting with Issue #875 (May 2009), written by Greg Rucka and drawn by Eddy Barrows, Thara Ak-Var and Chris Kent, took Superman's place as the main protagonists of the comic, while Superman left Earth to live on New Krypton. A Captain Atom backup feature began in Issue #879 (September 2009).

On February 22, 2010, a copy of Action Comics #1 (June 1938) sold at auction for $3 million, besting the $317,000 record for a comic book set by a different copy, in lesser condition, the previous year. The sale, by an anonymous seller to an anonymous buyer, was through the Manhattan-based auction company ComicConnect.com.

Although DC had initially announced Marc Guggenheim as writer of the title following the War of the Supermen limited series, he was replaced by Paul Cornell. Cornell featured Lex Luthor as the main character in Action Comics from Issues #890–900 and Death appeared in Issue #894, with the agreement of the character's creator, Neil Gaiman. In April 2011, the 900th issue of Action Comics was released. It served as a conclusion for Luthor's "Black Ring" storyline and a continuation for the "Reign of Doomsday" storyline. The final issue of the original series was Action Comics #904.

=== The New 52 ===
The title was relaunched from Issue #1, as part of 2011's The New 52 by the creative team of writer Grant Morrison and artist Rags Morales. As with all of the books associated with the relaunch, Clark Kent appears younger than the previous incarnation of the character. Action Comics focus on the early days of Superman's career, while the Superman series focus on Superman's present. Superheroes at large have appeared only in the past five years, and are viewed with at best, suspicion, and at worst, outright hostility. The storyline in Action Comics takes place about a year before the events of Justice League #1, and was referred to by DC co-publisher Dan DiDio as "DC Universe Year Zero" while JL operates as "Year One." The Man of Steel is not yet trusted by Metropolis citizens and wears a basic costume consisting of a caped T-shirt, jeans and work boots. The first issue has had five printings as of March 2012.

The first story arc of the relaunched series, entitled Superman and the Men of Steel for the collected edition, begins very early in Superman's career as he starts making a name for himself as a champion of the oppressed in Metropolis. He captures the attention of the military and scientist Lex Luthor, who are both interested in testing his capabilities as well as discovering what kind of threat he represents.

Following the completion of Morrison's storyline, writer Andy Diggle and artist Tony Daniel became the new creative team on the title with Issue #19. Unlike the previous issues, the setting for the Action Comics series would now take place in the present. Diggle announced his resignation as the writer of the series shortly before his first issue went on sale. Diggle left the title with only one issue completed (he was co-writer for #20 and co-plotted Issue #21), with Daniel taking on full scripting and art duties for the two following issues completing the three-part story arc "Hybrid". Scott Lobdell wrote the series after Diggle and Daniel's departure. Writer Greg Pak and artist Aaron Kuder became the new creative team on the series with Issue #25 (Jan. 2014). This series concluded with Issue #52 (July 2016), which was part of the "Final Days of Superman" storyline which depicted the death of the "New 52" version of Superman.

=== DC Rebirth ===
As part of DC Comics' DC Rebirth relaunch in June 2016, Action Comics reverted to its original numbering beginning with Action Comics #957. Written by Dan Jurgens, the series ships twice-monthly and serves as a continuation of the comic book series Superman: Lois and Clark, which featured the pre-Flashpoint Superman alongside his wife, Lois Lane, and their son, Jon Kent.

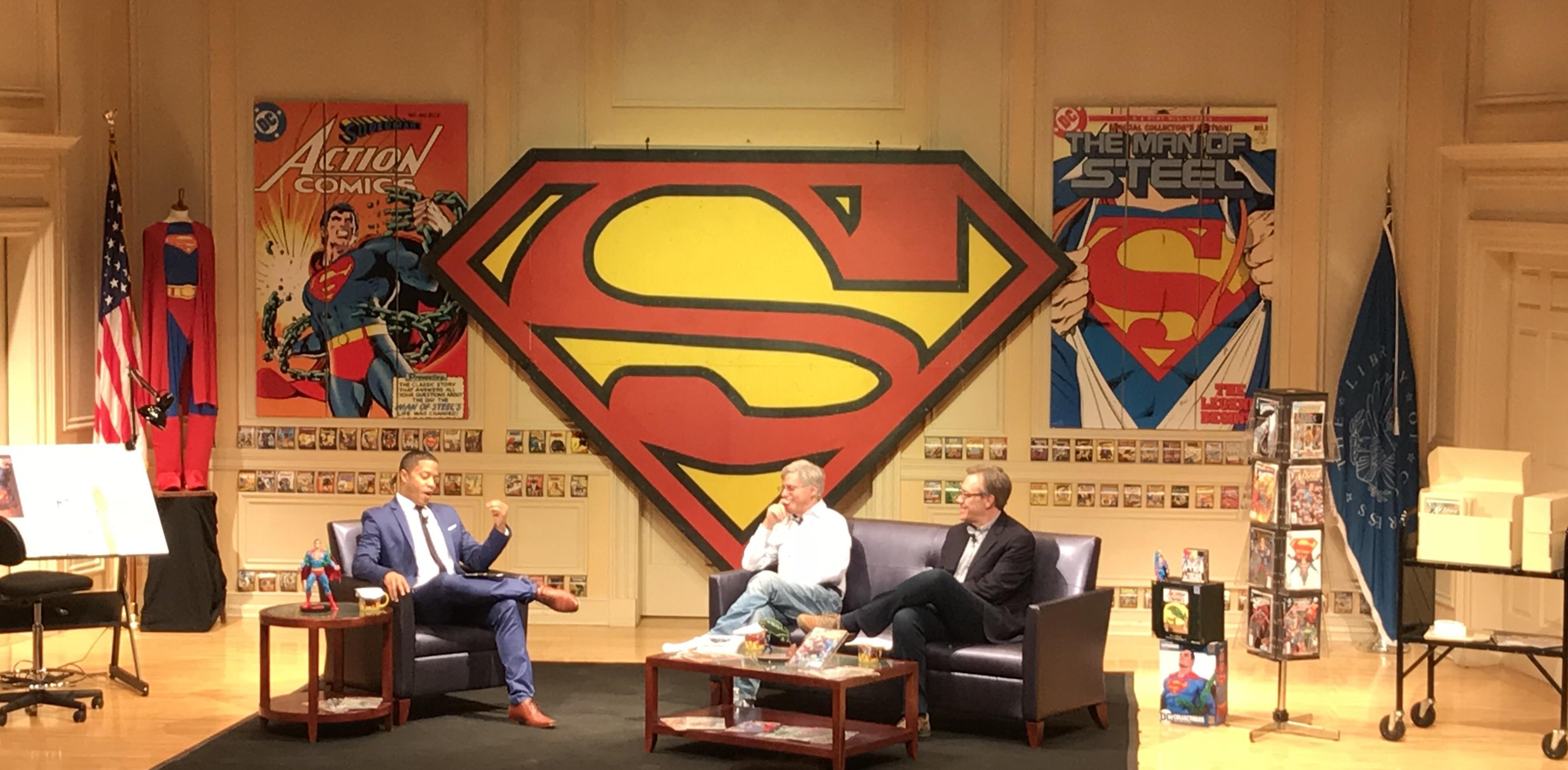
The Library of Congress hosting a discussion with Dan Jurgens and Paul Levitz for Superman's 80th anniversary and the 1,000th issue of Action Comics

For the series' 1000th issue—released on April 18, 2018, the 80th anniversary of the premiere issue—DC returned Superman to his traditional costume with the red trunks and yellow belt. Action Comics #1000 collects the regular cover, blank variant cover, eight covers spanning eight decades from the 1930s-2000s, nineteen other variant covers from variant artists, and a hardcover Action Comics: 80 Years of Superman Deluxe Edition.

Brian Michael Bendis became the new writer for the Action Comics series starting with Issue #1001.

=== Infinite Frontier ===
Starting with Issue #1029, the title became a part of the Infinite Frontier relaunch in March 2021. Phillip Kennedy Johnson became the lead writer on the series, as well as its companion series Superman. His run ended with Issue #1060, which was followed by short fill-in arcs by Jason Aaron, Joshua Williamson and Gail Simone, before Mark Waid took over the title with Issue #1070, beginning a 12 part weekly series title "Phantoms" which ended in Issue #1081, after which the title returned to a monthly schedule. After two short arcs written by John Ridley and G. Willow Wilson, Waid took on the title full time with Issue #1087.

== Publication changes and special numbering ==
Action Comics is the longest-running DC Comics series by number of issues, followed by Detective Comics. The first 333 issues adhered to a strict monthly schedule from June 1938 through February 1966. The following month had the first deviation from this schedule as the first of four giant-size Supergirl reprint issues was published as a 13th issue annually: Issues #334 (March 1966), #347 (March–April 1967), #360 (March–April 1968), and #373 (March–April 1969).

Between Issues #423 (April 1973) and #424 (June 1973), the series jumped ahead by one month due to DC's decision to change the cover dates of its publishing line.

Action Comics has not had an uninterrupted run, having been on a three-month hiatus on two separate occasions. The first of these occurred during the summer of 1986, with Issue #583 bearing a cover date of September, and Issue #584 listing January 1987. The regular Superman titles were suspended during this period to allow for the publication of John Byrne's six-issue The Man of Steel limited series. Publication was again suspended between Issues #686 and #687 (February and June 1993) following the "Death of Superman" and "Funeral for a Friend" storylines, before Action Comics returned in June 1993 with the "Reign of the Supermen" arc.

The series was published weekly from May 24, 1988, to March 14, 1989. (See detail in The Modern Age section above.) The temporarily increased frequency of issues allowed Action Comics to further surpass the older Detective Comics in the number of individual issues published. It surpassed Detective Comics in the 1970s when that series was bimonthly for a number of years. This change lasted from Issue #601 to Issue #642. During this time, Superman appeared only in a two-page story per issue; he was still the only character to appear in every issue of the series. During the time when Action Comics was weekly, DC's line of monthly comics underwent a change of cover dating in the opposite direction from the 1973 skipping of one month, instead adding two extra issues in between December 1988 and January 1989, but Action escaped this discontinuity by being in a differently-dated weekly series at the time.

An Issue #0 (October 1994) was published between Issues #703 and #704 as part of the Zero Month after the "Zero Hour: Crisis in Time" crossover event. There was an Issue #1,000,000 (November 1998) during the "DC One Million" crossover event in October 1998 between Issues #748 and #749.

On June 1, 2011, it was announced that all series taking place within the shared DC Universe would be either canceled or relaunched with new #1 issues, after a new continuity was created in the wake of the Flashpoint event. Although being DC's longest running series, having reached Issue #904 at the end of its initial run, Action Comics was no exception, and the first issue of the new series was released on September 7, 2011. During this "New 52" period, an instance of unusual numbering occurred in the "Villains Month" of September 2013, in which four extra issues were published between issues 23 and 24, numbered 23.1, 23.2, 23.3, and 23.4, featuring Cyborg Superman, General Zod, Lex Luthor, and Metallo respectively. Another special numbering was the second issue #0 of Action, released between #12 and #13 of the series with a cover date of November 2012, as part of the "Zero Month" promotion.

In February 2016, it was announced that as part of the DC Rebirth relaunch, Action Comics would resume its original numbering system, starting with Issue #957 (Aug. 2016) and ship on a twice-monthly schedule. While it returned to a monthly schedule later, there was a time when it temporarily went weekly during the "DC All In" relaunch in 2024.

=== Triangle numbers ===
From 1991 to 2002, the Superman titles, including Action, had an additional number on the cover besides the issue number, to indicate the order of Superman-related issues published within a calendar year, in a time when there were many story lines extending between the different titles and it was important to know what order to read them. This number was in a triangle (or, towards the end of the period, the shape of the Superman chest insignia) with the year and a consecutive number starting with the first of the year. Action Comics had these numbers on issues #661 (triangle number 1991/3) through #785 (2002/4). On occasion since then, cross-title numbering of a similar style has sometimes been used to show the order of parts of a crossover storyline, including the "New Krypton" story in 2008 and the "Final Days of Superman" story in 2016.

== Collected editions ==
The Action Comics series is included in many trade paperbacks and hardcovers. These generally reprint only the Superman stories from the given issues.

- Superman: The Action Comics Archives
  - Volume 1: reprints Issues #1, 7–20, and summarizes #2–6; May 1998; ISBN 978-1-56389-335-3
  - Volume 2: reprints Issues #21–36; December 1998; ISBN 978-1-56389-426-8
  - Volume 3: reprints Issues #37–52; August 2001; ISBN 978-1-56389-710-8
  - Volume 4: reprints Issues #53–68; June 2005; ISBN 978-1-4012-0408-2
  - Volume 5: reprints Issues #69–85; March 2007; ISBN 978-1-4012-1188-2
- The Superman Chronicles
  - Volume 1: reprints Issues #1–13; New York World's Fair Comics #1; Superman #1; January 2006; ISBN 978-1-4012-0764-9
  - Volume 2: reprints Issues #14–20; Superman #2–3; February 2007; ISBN 978-1-4012-1215-5
  - Volume 3: reprints Issues #21–25; New York World's Fair Comics #2; Superman #4–5; August 2007; ISBN 978-1-4012-1374-9
  - Volume 4: reprints Issues #26–31; Superman #6–7; February 2008; ISBN 978-1-4012-1658-0
  - Volume 5: reprints Issues #32–36; Superman #8–9; World's Best Comics #1; August 2008; ISBN 978-1-4012-1851-5
  - Volume 6: reprints Issues #37–40; Superman #10–11; World's Finest Comics #2–3; February 2009; ISBN 978-1-4012-2187-4
  - Volume 7: reprints Issues #41–43; Superman #12–13; World's Finest Comics #4; July 2009; ISBN 978-1-4012-2288-8
  - Volume 8: reprints Issues #44–47; Superman #14–15; April 2010; ISBN 978-1-4012-2647-3
  - Volume 9: reprints Issues #48–52; Superman #16–17; and World's Finest Comics #6; June 2011; ISBN 1-4012-3122-5
  - Volume 10: reprints Issues #53–55; Superman #18–19; and World's Finest Comics #7; September 2012; ISBN 1-4012-3488-7
- Superman: The Golden Age Omnibus
  - Volume 1: reprints Issues #1–31; Superman #1–7; New York World's Fair Comics #1–2; June 2013; ISBN 1-4012-4189-1
  - Volume 2: reprints Issues #32–47; Superman #8–15; World's Best Comics #1; World's Finest Comics #2–5; July 2016; ISBN 1-4012-6324-0
  - Volume 3: reprints Issues #48–63; Superman #16–23; World's Finest Comics #6–10; December 2016; ISBN 1-4012-7011-5
  - Volume 4: reprints Issues #64-85; Superman #24-33; World's Finest Comics #11-17; May 2017; ISBN 978-1-4012-7257-9
  - Volume 5: reprints Issues #86-103; Superman #34-42; World's Finest Comics #18-25; January 2018; ISBN 978-1-4012-7476-4
- Superman in the Forties, includes Issues #1–2, 14, 23, 64, 93, 107; November 2005; ISBN 978-1-4012-0457-0
- Superman in the Fifties, includes Issues #151, 242, 252, 254–255; October 2002; ISBN 978-1-56389-826-6
- Superman in the Sixties, includes Issue #289; October 1999; ISBN 978-1-56389-522-7
- Superman in the Seventies, includes Issue #484; November 2000; ISBN 978-1-56389-638-5
- Superman in the Eighties, includes Issues #507–508, 554, 595, 600, 644; April 2006; ISBN 978-1-4012-0952-0
- Adventures of Superman: Gil Kane collects Action Comics #539–541, 544–546 and 551–554; Superman #367, 372, 375; Superman Special #1–2; and DC Comics Presents Annual #3, 392 pages, January 2013, ISBN 978-1-4012-3674-8
- Superman: Action Comics (DC Rebirth until #1000, simply being called Action Comics)
  - Volume 1: Path of Doom, includes Action Comics Issues #957–962; February 2017; ISBN 978-1-4012-6804-6
  - Volume 2: Welcome to the Planet, collects Action Comics Issues #963–966, Justice League #52; April 2017; ISBN 978-1-4012-6911-1
  - Volume 3: Men of Steel, collects Action Comics Issues #967–972; June 2017
  - Superman Reborn, collects Action Comics Issues #973–976, Superman #18-19; September 2017
  - Volume 4: The New World, collects Action Comics Issues #977–984; November 2017
  - The Oz Effect, collects Action Comics Issues #985–992; March 2018
  - Volume 5: Booster Shot, collects Action Comics Issues #993–999, Action Comics Special #1; August 2018
  - Invisible Mafia, collects Action Comics Issues #1001–1006; April 2019
  - Leviathan Rising, collects Action Comics Issues #1007–1011, Superman: Leviathan Rising #1; November 2019
  - Leviathan Hunt, collects Action Comics Issues #1012–1016; May 2020
  - Metropolis Burning, collects Action Comics Issues #1017–1021; May 2021
  - The House of Kent, collects Action Comics Issues #1022–1028; August 2021
  - Warworld Rising, collects Action Comics Issues #1030-1035; 2022
  - The Arena, collects Action Comics Issues #1036-1042; 2022

== Awards ==
Action Comics #684 was part of "The Death of Superman" storyline which won the Comics Buyer's Guide Fan Award for "Favorite Comic Book Story" for 1992. Action Comics #687–691 were part of "The Reign of the Supermen" storyline, which won the same award for 1993.

== In other media ==
- In The Simpsons episode "Homer's Barbershop Quartet" (1993), Homer scavenges through a box of priceless artifacts, one of the items being the very first copy of Action Comics, which he dismisses all as junk and worthless.
- In The Iron Giant (1999), Hogarth shows the titular robot a collection of comic books, including an issue of Action Comics featuring Superman, and notes the Giant's comparison between him.
- Superman Returns (2006) features a scene in which Superman holds a car over his head in the same pose.
- In Batman v Superman: Dawn of Justice (2016), Lex Luthor's inmate number is AC-23-19-40, a reference to Luthor's first appearance in Action Comics as well as a newspaper clipping of Superman holding a car over his head in the same pose.
- The series premiere of Superman & Lois (2021) features a scene in which Superman saves a child from an uncontrolled green car, homaging the iconic #1 cover.
- In the My Adventures with Superman episode "Mobile Suit Toyman" (2026), Supergirl saves a child from being hit by a car, homaging the iconic #1 cover.

== Sales ==
Action Comics sales
Year(s)	Sales (est.)	Revenue (est.)
1960–1989	170,851,312	$34,752,239
1993	2,203,000	$4,103,250
1996–2001	3,055,766	$5,958,744
2002–2006	2,400,000	$5,400,000
2007–2008	1,200,000	$3,588,000
2009	192,400	$575,276
2010	439,000	$1,778,610
2011	950,600	$3,677,494
2012	1,035,600	$4,326,044
2013	777,500	$3,528,125
2014	583,704	$2,507,133
2015	440,757	$1,784,243
2016	1,080,297	$3,440,779
2017	1,179,798	$4,118,675
2018	1,119,097	$6,995,333
Total	187,508,831	$86,533,945

== See also ==
- List of DC Comics publications
- List of Superman comics
- Publication history of Superman
