= Superman (comic book) =

Comic book series featuring Superman

- Cover of Superman #1 (summer 1939), art by Joe Shuster.

Publication information
- Publisher: DC Comics
- Schedule: List: Quarterly: #1–5 Bimonthly: #6–85 Eight times a year: #86–232 Monthly: #233–423, #650–714 Twice monthly: vol. 4 #1–45 Monthly: vol. 5 #1–32 Monthly: vol. 6 #1–
- Format: Ongoing series
- Genre: Superhero
- Publication date: List: (vol. 1) June 1939 – September 1986; April 2006 – August 2011 (vol. 4) June 2016 – April 2018 (vol. 5) July 2018 – June 2021 (vol. 6) February 2023 – present
- No. of issues: List: (vol. 1) 488 (#1–423, #650–714), 14 Annuals and four Specials (one Superman Special Edition and three Superman Specials) (vol. 2) See 1986 revamp (vol. 3) 57 (#1–52, plus issues #0 and #23.1-23.4), 1 Special and 3 Annuals (vol. 4) 45 (#1–45), a DC Rebirth one-shot, one Superman Special, and one Annual (vol. 5) 32 (vol. 6) 19 and 1 Annual (as of August 2024 cover date)
- Main character(s): Superman; Lois Lane; Jimmy Olsen; Lex Luthor

Creative team
- Created by: Jerry Siegel; Joe Shuster
- Written by: List: (vol. 1): Cary Bates Kurt Busiek Don Cameron Bill Finger Geoff Johns Elliot S. Maggin Alan Moore Martin Pasko James Robinson Jim Shooter Jerry Siegel Len Wein (vol. 4): Peter J. Tomasi Patrick Gleason (vol. 5): Brian Michael Bendis Sean Lewis Phillip Kennedy Johnson (vol. 6): Joshua Williamson
- Penciller: List: (vol. 1): Joe Shuster Wayne Boring Al Plastino Ross Andru Curt Swan José Luis García-López Dick Dillin Stuart Immonen Pete Woods Renato Guedes Karl Kerschl Carlos Pacheco Eddy Barrows (vol. 4): Patrick Gleason Doug Mahnke (vol. 5): Ivan Reis
- Inker: List: (vol. 1): George Klein Mike Esposito Murphy Anderson Frank Chiaramonte Bob Oksner Jesus Merino (vol. 2): Karl Kesel Dennis Janke Brett Breeding Josef Rubinstein Dick Giordano Cam Smith Scott Williams

Superman is an ongoing American comic book series featuring the DC Comics superhero Superman as its protagonist. Superman began as one of several anthology features in the National Periodical Publications comic book Action Comics #1 in June 1938. The series proved so popular that National launched Superman into his own self-titled comic book, the first for any superhero, premiering with the cover date summer 1939. Between 1986 and 2006 it was retitled The Adventures of Superman, while a new series used the title Superman. In May 2006, it was returned to its original title and numbering. The title was canceled with issue #714 in 2011, and was relaunched with issue #1 the following month which ended its run in 2016. A fourth series was released in June 2016 and ended in April 2018, while the fifth series was launched in July 2018 and ended in June 2021. The series was replaced by Superman: Son of Kal-El in July 2021, featuring adventures of Superman's son, Jon Kent. A sixth Superman series was released in February 2023.

== Publication history ==
=== Superman volume 1 ===
Due to the Superman character's popularity after his premiere in Action Comics #1, National Allied Publications decided to launch an entirely new magazine featuring a single character, which at that time was unprecedented. Superman #1 appeared on the shelves in the summer of 1939. Superman now also had the distinction of being the first ever hero-character featured in more than one comic magazine. By issue #7, Superman was being hailed on the covers as the "World's Greatest Adventure Strip Character". Perry White, a supporting character who had originated on the Superman radio program was introduced into the comic book in issue #7 (October 1940). Editor Mort Weisinger began his long association with the title with issue #11 (July–August 1941). Jimmy Olsen first appeared as a named character in the story "Superman versus The Archer" in Superman #13 (Nov.–Dec. 1941). In the early 1940s, Superman was selling over a million copies per month. By 1942, artist Wayne Boring, who had previously been one of Shuster's assistants, had become a major artist on Superman. Superman #23 (July–August 1943) featured the first Superman comic book story written by someone other than Jerry Siegel. The story "America's Secret Weapon!" was written by Don Cameron despite bearing Siegel's signature. Siegel introduced Mister Mxyzptlk in issue #30 (September 1944). A more detailed origin story for Superman was presented in issue #53 (July 1948) to mark the character's tenth anniversary. Another part of the Superman mythos which had originated on the radio program made its way into the comic books when kryptonite was featured in a story by Bill Finger and Al Plastino.

Superman was the first DC title with a letters column as a regular feature beginning with issue #124 (September 1958). In the view of comics historian Les Daniels, artist Curt Swan became the definitive artist of Superman in the early 1960s with a "new look" to the character that replaced Wayne Boring's version. Writer Jim Shooter and Swan crafted the story "Superman's Race With the Flash!" in Superman #199 (Aug. 1967) which featured the first race between the Flash and Superman, two characters known for their super-speed powers.

Julius Schwartz became the title's editor with issue #233 (January 1971) and together with writer Denny O'Neil and artist Curt Swan streamlined the Superman mythos, starting with the elimination of Kryptonite. Elliot S. Maggin began his long association with the title with the story "Must There Be a Superman?" in issue #247 (Jan. 1972). Writer Cary Bates, in collaboration with Swan, introduced such characters as the supervillain Terra-Man in issue #249 (March 1972) and the superhero Vartox in issue #281 (Nov. 1974). Issues #272 (Feb. 1974), #278 (Aug. 1974), and #284 (Feb. 1975) of the series were in the 100 Page Super Spectacular format. Superman #300 (June 1976) featured an out-of-continuity story by Bates and Maggin which imagined the infant Superman landing on Earth in 1976 and becoming a superhero in 2001. The tale was an inspiration for Mark Millar's Superman: Red Son limited series published in 2003. DC's parent company Warner Communications reinstated the byline for Jerry Siegel and Joe Shuster which had been dropped decades earlier, and the first issue with the restored credit was Superman #301 (August 1976). Martin Pasko and Swan created the Master Jailer character in issue #331 (January 1979). The shrunken city of Kandor, which had been introduced in 1958, was restored to normal size in a story by Len Wein and Swan in Superman #338 (August 1979).

The series reached issue #400 in October 1984. That issue featured work by several popular comics artists including the only major DC work by Jim Steranko as well as an introduction by noted science fiction author Ray Bradbury. Superman ran uninterrupted until the mid-1980s, when DC Comics instituted a line-wide relaunch with the 1985 event Crisis on Infinite Earths. Folding their vast multiverse into a single shared universe, Superman and his supporting cast received a massive overhaul at the hands of writer/artist John Byrne. One last story, which also marked the end of Schwartz's tenure as editor of the series, was published to give a send-off to the former status quo: Alan Moore's Whatever Happened to the Man of Tomorrow? The story's first part saw publication in Superman #423, which would be the last issue before the title was relaunched with its legacy numbering as The Adventures of Superman. Superman was relaunched with a new #1 issue in a second volume in 1986, published concurrently with The Adventures of Superman.

==== Return to the original title ====
Superman volume 2 reached issue #226 (April 2006) and was then canceled as part of the linewide "Infinite Crisis" storyline. The Adventures of Superman was returned to its original title, Superman, with issue #650 (May 2006), as a part of the "One Year Later" banner. Superman had a crossover with Action Comics, titled "Up, Up and Away!" co-written by Geoff Johns and Kurt Busiek with art by Pete Woods. This storyline told of Clark Kent attempting to protect Metropolis without his powers until eventually regaining them. Busiek became the sole writer of the series with issue #654 (September 2006) and Carlos Pacheco became the series' artist. The series participated in the weekly series Countdown to Final Crisis, giving a different perspective on certain events shown in the weekly title, such as the events preceding the death of Lightray.

Busiek and Pacheco developed an extended storyline featuring Arion coming into conflict with Superman. The plotline concluded in Superman Annual #13. Alex Ross painted the covers for issues #675 (June 2008) through #685 (April 2009).

James Robinson replaced Busiek with issue #677 (August 2008). Robinson's run on the title began with "The Coming of Atlas" story arc and began a link between Superman, Action Comics, and Supergirl that started a long-form narrative with the New Krypton event. The majority of Robinson's run featured Mon-El and Guardian as the featured characters, while Superman himself had gone to live on the planet New Krypton. Robinson's last full issue was #699, tying into Last Stand of New Krypton, and he finished his run in a short story in issue #700 (August 2010) that returned Superman to Earth. Superman #700 also saw writer J. Michael Straczynski, a self-professed Superman fan who feels a personal connection to the character, take over writing duties with a short story in the issue, and his run on the title began with issue #701. Artist Eddy Barrows, a previous Action Comics artist and one of the artists on the War of the Supermen event, was Straczynski's artistic collaborator. Straczynski and Barrows began a year-long story entitled "Grounded" that sees Superman begin a long walk across the United States to regain the connection with his adopted home that he feels he lost while away on New Krypton. The series ended with issue #714 (October 2011), prior to DC Comics' The New 52 company wide reboot and relaunch.

=== Superman volume 4 ===
As part of the DC Rebirth relaunch, Superman Volume 4 began with issue #1 in June 2016 (cover dated August 2016), including a one-shot DC Rebirth special Superman: Rebirth #1. Peter J. Tomasi and Patrick Gleason are the creative team, with the Superman series shipping twice-monthly. This volume's 34th issue was also the 800th issue of the Superman series as a whole, with a variant cover done by Tony S. Daniel to commemorate the occasion. The series ended its run with issue #45 (April 2018).

=== Superman volume 5 ===
A fifth series under the direction of Brian Michael Bendis was released in July 2018 and ended its run in June 2021 with issue #32.

=== Superman: Son of Kal-El ===
Superman: Son of Kal-El, written by Tom Taylor and art by John Timms, replaced the Superman title in July 2021. The monthly series concluded in December 2022, with 18 issues and one annual. The series followed the adventures of Jon Kent, the son of Superman and Lois Lane, as he is entrusted with the protection of Earth.

=== Superman volume 6 ===
A new ongoing Superman comic book series launched in February 2023 from writer Joshua Williamson and artist Jamal Campbell.

== Annuals ==
The Superman series had Annuals published since 1960. Eight issues of Superman Annual were published starting in winter 1960. An additional four issues were published from 1983 to 1986 and the numbering continued from the 1960 series. Superman Annual #11 (1985) featured the story "For the Man Who Has Everything" by Alan Moore and Dave Gibbons.

== Legacy ==
A copy of the first issue of the original series from 1939 was discovered in an attic in California in 2024. Its quality was assessed by the Certified Guaranty Company as 9.0 out of 10.0, the best known copy of the issue at that time. It was sold at Heritage Auctions in November 2025 at $9.12 million, the largest price a comic book had sold at auction, beating the previous record of $3.2 million for Action Comics 1 sold in 2014.

== Collected editions ==
=== Superman ===
- Superman Archives
  - Vol. 1 collects Superman #1–4, 272 pages, 1989, ISBN 1-4012-0630-1
  - Vol. 2 collects Superman #5–8, 272 pages, 1990, ISBN 0-930289-76-5
  - Vol. 3 collects Superman #9–12, 272 pages, 1991, ISBN 1-56389-002-X
  - Vol. 4 collects Superman #13–16, 224 pages, 1994, ISBN 1-56389-107-7
  - Vol. 5 collects Superman #17–20, 224 pages, March 2000, ISBN 1-56389-602-8
  - Vol. 6 collects Superman #21–24, 216 pages, July 2003, ISBN 1-56389-969-8
  - Vol. 7 collects Superman #25–29, 240 pages, April 2006, ISBN 1-4012-1051-1
  - Vol. 8 collects Superman #30–35, 256 pages, October 2010, ISBN 1-4012-2885-2
- Superman: The Golden Age Omnibus
  - Vol. 1: includes Superman #1–7; 784 pages, June 2013, ISBN 978-1-4012-4189-6
  - Vol. 2: includes Superman #8-15; 750 pages, July 2016, ISBN 978-1-4012-6324-9
  - Vol. 3: includes Superman #16–24; 720 pages, December 2016, ISBN 978-1-4012-7011-7
  - Vol. 4: includes Superman #25-33; 768 pages, May 2017, ISBN 978-1-4012-7257-9
  - Vol. 5: includes Superman #34-42; 768 pages, January 2018, ISBN 978-1-4012-7476-4
- The Superman Chronicles
  - Vol. 1: includes Superman #1; 208 pages, February 2006, ISBN 978-1-4012-0764-9
  - Vol. 2: includes Superman #2–3; 192 pages, February 2007, ISBN 978-1-4012-1215-5
  - Vol. 3: includes Superman #4–5; 192 pages, August 2007, ISBN 978-1-4012-1374-9
  - Vol. 4: includes Superman #6–7; 192 pages, February 2008, ISBN 978-1-4012-1658-0
  - Vol. 5: includes Superman #8–9; 192 pages, August 2008, ISBN 978-1-4012-1851-5
  - Vol. 6: includes Superman #10–11; 192 pages, February 2009, ISBN 978-1-4012-2187-4
  - Vol. 7: includes Superman #12–13; 168 pages, July 2009, ISBN 978-1-4012-2288-8
  - Vol. 8: includes Superman #14–15; 168 pages, April 2010, ISBN 978-1-4012-2647-3
  - Vol. 9: includes Superman #16–17; 192 pages, June 2011, ISBN 978-1-4012-3122-4
  - Vol. 10: includes Superman #18–19; 168 pages, September 2012, ISBN 978-1-4012-3488-1
- Superman: The Man of Tomorrow Archives
  - Vol. 1 includes Superman #122–126, 224 pages, May 2005, ISBN 1-4012-0156-3
  - Vol. 2 includes Superman #127–131, 240 pages, March 2006, ISBN 1-4012-0767-7
  - Vol. 3 includes Superman #132–139, 408 pages, July 2013, ISBN 978-1-4012-4107-0
- Showcase Presents: Superman
  - Vol. 1 includes Superman #122–133, 560 pages, October 2005, ISBN 1-4012-0758-8
  - Vol. 2 includes Superman #134–145, 560 pages, June 2006, ISBN 1-4012-1041-4
  - Vol. 3 includes Superman #146–156; Superman Annual #3–4, 560 pages, April 2007, ISBN 1-4012-1271-9
  - Vol. 4 includes Superman #157–166, 544 pages, September 2008, ISBN 1-4012-1847-4
- Adventures of Superman: José Luis García-López collects Superman #294, 301–302, 307–309 and 347; DC Comics Presents #1–4, 17, 20, 24, and 31, and All-New Collectors' Edition #C-54, 360 pages, April 2013, ISBN 978-1-4012-3856-8.
- Adventures of Superman: Gil Kane collects Superman #367, 372, 375; Superman Special #1–2; Action Comics #539–541, 544–546 and 551–554; and DC Comics Presents Annual #3, 392 pages, January 2013, ISBN 978-1-4012-3674-8.
- Superman: Up, Up, and Away! includes Superman #650–653, 192 pages, September 2006, ISBN 978-1-4012-0954-4
- Superman: Camelot Falls
  - Vol. 1 collects Superman #654–658, 128 pages, July 2008, ISBN 978-1-4012-1205-6
  - Vol. 2 collects Superman #662–664, 667 and Superman Annual #13, 128 pages, March 2009, ISBN 978-1-4012-1865-2
- Superman: The Third Kryptonian collects Superman #668–670 and the backup story from Superman Annual #13, 128 pages, October 2008, ISBN 978-1-4012-1987-1
- Superman: Redemption includes Superman #659 and 666, 112 pages, January 2008, ISBN 978-1-4012-1636-8
- Superman: 3-2-1 Action includes Superman #665, 160 pages, April 2008, ISBN 978-1-4012-1680-1
- Superman: Shadows Linger collects Superman #671–675, 144 pages, January 2009, ISBN 978-1-4012-2125-6
- Superman: The Coming of Atlas collects Superman #677–680 and 1st Issue Special #1, 128 pages, April 2010, ISBN 978-1-4012-2132-4
- Superman: New Krypton
  - Vol. 1 includes Superman #681, 176 pages, May 2009, ISBN 978-1-4012-2329-8
  - Vol. 2 includes Superman #682–683, 160 pages, September 2009, ISBN 978-1-4012-2319-9
- Superman: Mon-El
  - Vol. 1 collects Superman #684–690, 224 pages, February 2011, ISBN 978-1-4012-2635-0
  - Vol. 2 collects Superman #692–697; Superman Annual #14; and Superman Secret Files and Origins 2009, 224 pages, October 2011, ISBN 978-1-4012-2938-2
- Superman: Codename: Patriot includes Superman #691, 144 pages, April 2011, ISBN 978-1-4012-2657-2
- Superman: Nightwing and Flamebird Vol. 2 includes Superman #696, 208 pages, October 2011, ISBN 978-1-4012-2940-5
- Superman: Last Stand of New Krypton
  - Vol. 1 includes Superman #698, 168 pages, November 2011, ISBN 978-1-4012-2933-7
  - Vol. 2 includes Superman #699, 128 pages, March 2012, ISBN 978-1-4012-3037-1
- Superman: Grounded
  - Vol. 1 collects Superman #700–706, 168 pages, May 2012, ISBN 978-1-4012-3076-0
  - Vol. 2 collects Superman #707–711 and 713–714, 168 pages, December 2012, ISBN 978-1-4012-3532-1

=== DC Rebirth ===
- Vol. 1: Son of Superman collects Superman (vol. 4) #1-6 and Superman: Rebirth #1, 176 pages, January 2017, ISBN 978-1-4012-6776-6
- Vol. 2: Trials of the Super Son collects Superman (vol. 4) #7-13, 168 pages, April 2017, ISBN 978-1-4012-6860-2
- Vol. 3: Multiplicity collects Superman (vol. 4) #14-17 and Superman Annual #1, 144 pages, August 2017, ISBN 978-1-4012-7154-1
- Vol. 4: Black Dawn collects Superman (vol. 4) #20-26, 176 pages, November 2017, ISBN 978-1-4012-7468-9
- Vol. 5: Hopes and Fears collects Superman (vol. 4) #27-32, 144 pages, April 2018, ISBN 978-1-4012-7729-1
- Vol. 6: Imperius Lex collects Superman (vol. 4) #33-36 and #39-41, 168 pages, August 2018, ISBN 978-1-4012-8123-6
- Vol. 7: Bizarroverse collects Superman (vol. 4) #42-45 and material from Superman Special #1, 156 pages, November 2018, ISBN 978-1-4012-8524-1

Superman (vol. 4) has also been released in four deluxe hardcovers:

- Superman: Rebirth Deluxe Edition Book 1 collects Superman (vol. 4) #1-13 and Superman: Rebirth #1, 336 pages, September 2017, ISBN 978-1-4012-7155-8
- Superman: Rebirth Deluxe Edition Book 2 collects Superman (vol. 4) #14-26 and Superman Annual #1, 360 pages, May 2018, ISBN 978-1-4012-7866-3
- Superman: Rebirth Deluxe Edition Book 3 collects Superman (vol. 4) #27-36, 240 pages, December 2018, ISBN 978-1-4012-8451-0
- Superman: Rebirth Deluxe Edition Book 4 collects Superman (vol. 4) #37-45, Superman Special #1 and a story from Action Comics #1000, 280 pages, May 2019, ISBN 978-1-4012-8935-5

=== DC Universe ===
- Vol. 1: The Unity Saga: Phantom Earth collects Superman (vol. 5) #1-6, 168 pages, February 2019, ISBN 978-1-4012-8819-8
- Vol. 2: The Unity Saga: The House of El collects Superman (vol. 5) #7-15
- Vol. 3: The Truth Revealed collects Superman (vol. 5) #16-19, Superman: Heroes #1, Superman: Villains #1
- Vol. 4: Mythological collects Superman (vol. 5) #20-28
- Vol. 5: The One Who Fell collects Action Comics (vol. 1) #1029, Superman (vol. 5) #29-32

== See also ==
- Batman (comic book)
- The Flash (comic book)
- Green Lantern (comic book)
- Wonder Woman (comic book)
- List of DC Comics publications
- List of Superman comics
