= Superman: War of the Supermen =

DC comics Storyline

- Cover of War of the Supermen #1 (July 2010), art by Eddy Barrows.

Publication information
- Publisher: DC Comics
- Schedule: Weekly
- Format: Limited series
- Genre: Superhero
- Publication date: June – July 2010
- No. of issues: 5 (4 plus issue numbered 0)
- Main character(s): Superman; Supergirl; Superboy; Steel; General Zod; Non; Ursa

Creative team
- Written by: James Robinson; Sterling Gates
- Penciller(s): Eddy Barrows; Jamal Igle; Eduardo Pansica; Wayne Faucher; CAFU; Bit

Collected editions
- Paperback: ISBN 978-1401-231-87-3
- Hardcover: ISBN 978-1401-229-67-2

Superman: War of the Supermen is an American comic book limited series from DC Comics that serves as the culmination to the Superman line-wide event New Krypton. The series began on Free Comic Book Day 2010, with a zero-issue released free of charge before the main limited series began the following week.

The event was published throughout one month in May 2010. No other Superman family books were solicited that month other than Superman/Batman and Adventure Comics, neither of which cross over into the War of the Supermen.

== Plot ==
Following the events of New Krypton, World of New Krypton and Last Stand of New Krypton, the people of the new planet Krypton and Earth wage war after General Zod issues a formal declaration after discovering a human (Lex Luthor) helped destroy their planet. Superman is caught in the crossfire and must keep peace between Earth and the people that represent his heritage.

=== Prologue ===
As the series opens on the heels of the conclusion to Last Stand of New Krypton, Superman is furious that Zod is moving forward with his plans to make war with Earth. He punches his way into Zod's underground military installation and confronts him. Superman declares his intent to shut down Zod and his war machine. He punctuates his remarks by landing a hard right fist to Zod's jaw.

Rather than retaliate personally, Zod has his minions, Ursa and Non, do his dirty work. Ursa attacks Superman with a kryptonite knife, which draws blood. Superman damages the knife with his heat vision, but does not completely destroy it. Then Non attacks from above, descending feet first and landing hard on Superman. Non and Ursa restrain Superman while Zod gloats.

The entire time, Superman and Zod are engaged in dialogue that recaps the events of Brainiac through Last Stand while Zod gloats and threatens to destroy all humans on Earth and Superman expresses his determination to prevent this. The final two-page spread depicts countless Kryptonians speeding towards Earth in the first wave of the attack.

=== The War Begins ===
The story then continues as Zod gloats over his released forces, telling Superman there is no hope. Superman insists there is hope and tries to escape, fighting Zod and his crew. Supergirl comes upon Reactron being tortured by Alura, and sides against her mother. Reactron reveals he was always meant to be caught, and begins to detonate. Alura shoves Supergirl into a containment vessel just before Reactron explodes, destroying New Krypton.

Meanwhile, Jimmy Olsen and Lois Lane bring Guardian, Nightwing, Flamebird, Steel, and Superboy up to speed on what has been happening with Sam Lane. Superwoman hears, and smiles. Superman and Supergirl cry over the lost planet. Supergirl takes up the battle standard and flees. The New Kryptonian armada approaches Earth as Zod spurs them on.

In the Daily Planet newsroom, Lois reveals New Krypton is dead when Superwoman bursts in and abducts her. In space, Supergirl and Superman power through the field of kryptonite meteors until they crash into Callisto, New Krypton's moon. Kara laments that the planet's destruction is her fault, and Superman sadly reveals she is the Last Daughter of New Krypton.

=== The First Wave ===
Meanwhile, Jimmy, Steel, Nightwing, Flamebird, Superboy, and Guardian track Natasha Irons to a cell inside Mount Rushmore and launch a rescue mission. At the same moment inside Project 7734, Codename Assassin and Sam Lane are rejoicing over the deaths of the Kryptonians as Lucy arrives with Lois. Sam is hopeful until he sees Earth's Mars base is being destroyed by Zod's forces. Superman and Supergirl arrive and force both sides back; Zod uses this time to launch an armada of soldiers directly for Earth.

=== Earth Retaliates ===
Sam communicates with Lex Luthor, who reveals he has harnessed the power from Jax-Ur's Rao corpse and the government's time pool technology to launch their counterattack. In return, he regains control of LexCorp along with his pardon. With the deal done, a missile is shot through the black hole/time pool directly into Earth's yellow sun, turning it red. Now powerless in space, Superman, Supergirl and the Kryptonians begin to suffocate.

Superboy, Steel, Guardian, Nightwing and Flamebird, and Krypto all converge on Project 7734 at Mount Rushmore. Steel is carrying Jimmy Olsen and Steel's niece Natasha Irons, now rescued from Project 7734. Jimmy Olsen gets Natasha's story out over his newsgroup called the Newsboy Legion.

=== The Sun Restored ===
Nightwing and Flamebird realize Lex Luthor is using the fake god Rao to turn the sun red. Flamebird flies to the sun to save the Kryptonians and Nightwing follows. Nightwing tells Flamebird that he will do this with her, but the Nightwing apparition takes him away to the Phantom Zone, leaving Flamebird to ignite and turn the sun back to yellow. Flamebird dies as Superman and Supergirl catch their now returned super breaths and watch as 73,000 Kryptonians die in space. Zod notes there are now only 7,000 Kryptonians left. Zod, Non, and Ursa fly toward Earth to lead the attack by the survivors. All over the planet, the Kryptonians wreak havoc by killing world leaders, destroying landmarks, and facing off against both super-heroes and Green kryptonite robots. Ursa flies toward the White House seeking to kill the President, until she is intercepted by Supergirl, who forces her into a fight.

General Zod leads his forces to Metropolis, where Superman stands atop the Daily Planet building waiting for them for the final showdown.

=== Superman vs. General Zod: The Final Battle ===
As Superman and Zod clash, Zod reveals he has resolved to turn Earth into New Krypton. Superboy manages to recover the Phantom Zone projector from the Fortress of Solitude—stating that the Phantom Zone "got better" in response to Zod's claims of having destroyed it—and uses it to send Non to the Zone as he attacks the Justice League. After narrowly defeating Ursa, Supergirl flies into the military base to confront Sam Lane, ready to kill him in revenge for the death of her people, only for Lois to talk Supergirl down. Refusing to face judgment for his crimes and realizing that he has gone too far in his plan to protect Earth from the Kryptonians, Lane apparently commits suicide. As Superboy arrives at Superman's fight with Zod, Superman attempts to drag Zod into the Zone with him. Nightwing arrives and sends Superman back to Earth so that he can continue to defend it while remaining in the Phantom Zone to ensure that Zod remains trapped. Nightwing reverts to a young boy inside the Zone, encounters Mon-El, and the two journey off together within the Zone.

=== Aftermath ===
In the aftermath, Clark and Lois reflect sadly on how New Krypton's appearance resulted in such a pointless war, Clark expressing his uncertainty about whether any Kryptonians are left in hiding on Earth while Lois promises to write the truth about her father's actions despite the media portraying him as a hero for his 'defensive action', hoping that someday humanity will be ready for interaction with other alien races.

Superman: Grounded sees Superman attempt to reconnect with humanity after returning to Earth from New Krypton.

== Collected editions ==
- Superman: War of the Supermen (144 pages, collects Superman: War of the Supermen #0–4 and a page from Superman #700)

== See also ==
- Brainiac (story arc)
- Superman: New Krypton
- Superman: World of New Krypton
- Superman: Last Stand of New Krypton
