= Batman Unlimited: Monster Mayhem =

- DVD cover
- Directed by: Butch Lukic
- Screenplay by: Heath Corson
- Based on: Batman Unlimited by: Mattel
- Produced by: Butch Lukic
- Starring: Roger Craig Smith; Khary Payton; Troy Baker
- Edited by: Bruce A. King
- Music by: Kevin Riepl
- Production companies: Warner Bros. Animation; DC Entertainment
- Distributed by: Warner Home Video
- Release date: August 18, 2015
- Running time: 81 minutes
- Country: United States
- Language: English

Batman Unlimited: Monster Mayhem is an American animated superhero film and the second entry in the Batman Unlimited series. It was released on August 18, 2015 on Blu-ray, DVD and Digital HD. It is a sequel to Batman Unlimited: Animal Instincts.

== Plot ==
A new crime wave strikes Gotham City. On Halloween night, Solomon Grundy and Silver Banshee escape from Arkham Asylum and meet with Scarecrow, dodging Nightwing and Green Arrow along the way. Video game designer Gogo Shoto is kidnapped by Clayface. Scarecrow and Silver Banshee steal an artificial intelligence designed by Professor Ivo. Grundy steals a battery at the atomic power plant despite Nightwing's attempt to stop him. Grundy loads the battery into an ice cream truck driven by the Joker. The Joker forces Shoto to help him play a prank on the citizens of Gotham.

Bruce Wayne, Oliver Queen, and Dick Grayson attend an Inca exhibition at the Gotham Museum, where the main attraction is the "Rose Stone", a recent discovery by Cyborg. Cyborg reveals that the Rose Stone is capable of conducting energy. When the opening ceremony starts, the Joker interrupts the proceedings. Clayface takes on the form of a Tyrannosaurus and attacks the crowd. The Joker uses a computer virus to take control of all electronic technology in Gotham, including Cyborg, who is forced to aid the Joker. The heroes pursue Joker and the other villains, but they escape. The villains take over the city and Joker declares himself mayor, installing the other villains in his cabinet. The heroes return to the Batcave and discover that the Joker is planning a parade in his own honor. Batman deduces that the villains are hiding out in an abandoned amusement park on the pier. The heroes travel to the amusement park, battle the villains, free Shoto, and take him to the Batcave. While there, Shoto gives Batman a device that allows him to enter Professor Ivo's virtual world.

The Joker plans to send the virus worldwide. Once the Joker's parade starts, Batman gets close to Joker and uses Shoto's device to enter the AI world, where he sees many copies of the Joker. Batman and the heroes break the Joker's control over Cyborg. Batman realizes Joker intends to use Cyborg as the transmitter to unleash the virus. Cyborg finds the Rose Stone in his left arm. On the advice of Shoto, he places the Stone on the back of the Joker's mech suit. The suit shorts out, Joker falls into the sea, and all the technology reboots. The villains are taken back to Arkham and the Joker begins preparing his next plan.

== Cast ==
- Roger Craig Smith as Batman/Bruce Wayne
- Troy Baker as The Joker
- Khary Payton as Cyborg/Victor Stone
- Chris Diamantopoulos as Green Arrow/Oliver Queen
- Will Friedle as Nightwing/Dick Grayson
- Yuri Lowenthal as Red Robin/Tim Drake
- Kari Wuhrer as Silver Banshee/Siobhan McDougal
- Fred Tatasciore as Solomon Grundy/Cyrus Gold
- Brian T. Delaney as Scarecrow/Jonathan Crane
- Dave B. Mitchell as Clayface/Basil Karlo
- Noel Fisher as Gogo Shoto
- Cedric Yarbrough as Silas Stone
- Eric Bauza as Houston Raines
- Richard Epcar as Commissioner James Gordon
- Alastair Duncan as Alfred Pennyworth
- Amanda Troop as Gladys Windsmere, Newscaster
- Steve Blum as Gruff Cop, Watchman #2
- Janell Cox as Ana, Computer

== Reception ==
Smtih, Diamantopolus, Friedle, Lowenthal, Duncan, and Epcar reprise their roles from the previous film, while more actors from past DC media reprise their roles for this film. Troy Baker reprises his role as The Joker from Batman: Arkham Origins, Khary Payton reprised his role as Cyborg from both both Teen Titans and Teen Titans Go!, as well as Injustice: Gods Among Us, and Fred Tatasciore reprised his role of Solomon Grundy from Batman: Arkham City, Batman: Arkham Origins Blackgate, Injustice: Gods Among Us, and Lego Batman 3: Beyond Gotham.

Both Common Sense Media and CineMagazine rated the film 3 stars.

== Sequel ==
The film was followed by a sequel, Batman Unlimited: Mechs vs. Mutants, which was released on July 24, 2016.

== See also ==
- List of films set around Halloween
