= Dave B. Mitchell =

American voice actor

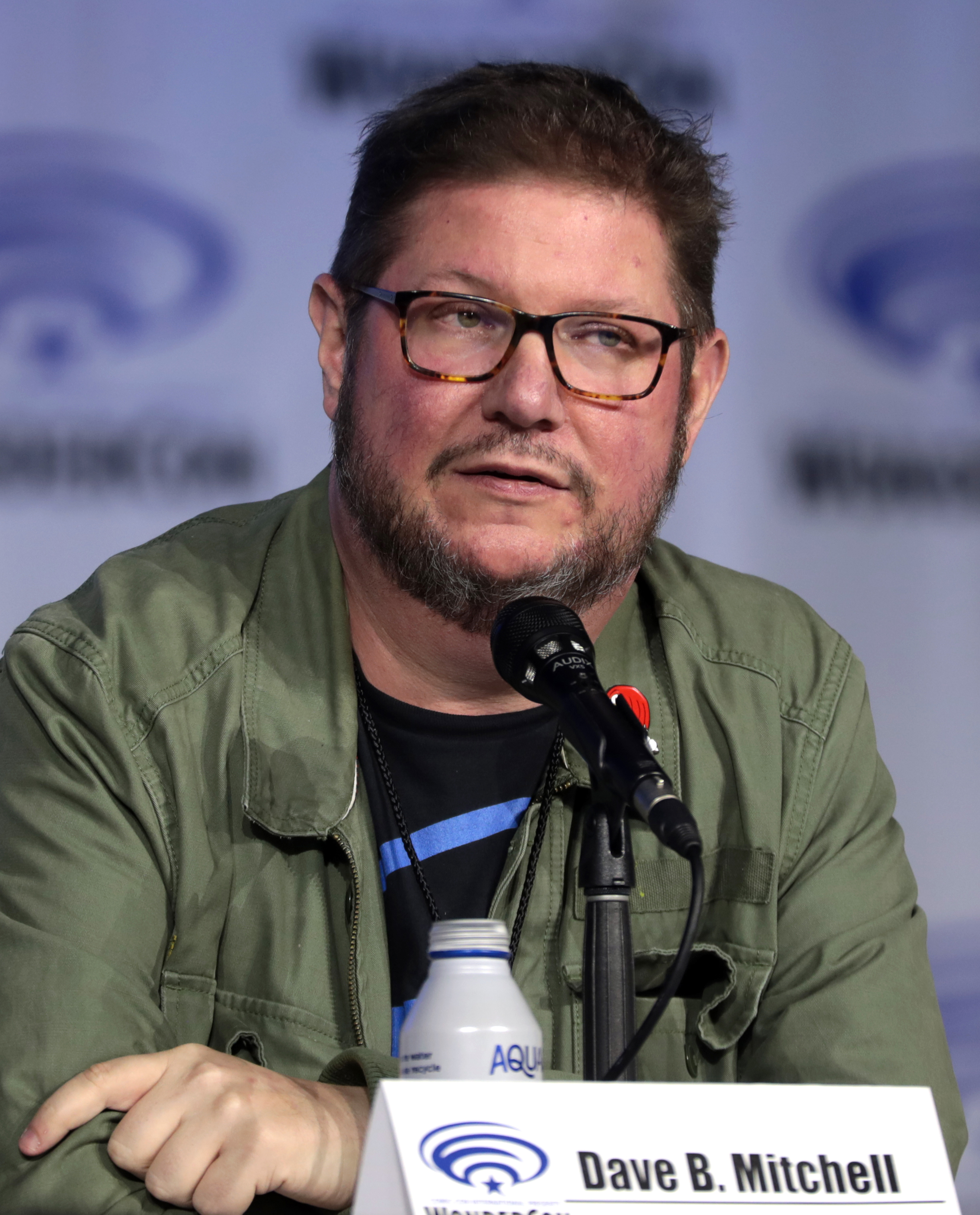
- Mitchell in 2022
- Born: David Benjamin Mitchell
- Occupation: Voice actor
- Years active: 1997–present

David Benjamin Mitchell is an American voice actor, who is best known as the voice of Knuckles the Echidna in the Sonic the Hedgehog franchise, since 2019.

== Career ==
Since beginning his professional voiceover career in 1997, his voice has appeared in hundreds of projects in film, television, animation, video games, audiobooks and on the Internet. He co-starred on Comedy Central's Lil' Bush and was heard as the announcer in California Milk Advisory Board's series of "Happy Cows" commercials.

In 2019, he became the current voice of Knuckles the Echidna in the Sonic the Hedgehog franchise, beginning with Team Sonic Racing.

He is a member of SAG-AFTRA and the American Society of Composers, Authors, and Publishers (ASCAP). He is represented by Dean Panaro Talent in Los Angeles, where he currently resides.

== Filmography ==
=== Animation ===
List of voice performances in animation
Year	Title	Role	Notes	Source
2007–08	Lil' Bush	George Sr., Jeb Bush, Li'l Mark Foley, Li'l John McCain, Li'l Fred Thompson, Li'l Joe Lieberman, Li'l Tony Blair		
2011–12	Winx Club	King Cryos, Codatorta, additional voices	English dub	
2012	Doc McStuffins	Boomer	Episode: "Busted Boomer"	
2012–16	Peter Rabbit	Mr. McGregor, Old Brown		
2014	WWE Slam City	Stone Cold Steve Austin	Episode: "Cold... Stone Cold"	
2014	The Tom and Jerry Show	Meathead, Tom No. 2, Tom No. 3, Tom No. 6		
2014	Clarence	TV Commercial Announcer	Episode: "Jeff's New Toy"	
2014	We Wish You a Merry Walrus	Herbert P. Bear	Television special	
2015	Club Penguin: Monster Beach Party	Herbert P. Bear	Television special	
2015–16	TripTank	Various		
2016	Batman Unlimited	Clayface	Episode: "Breakout or Bust"	
2016	The Mr. Peabody & Sherman Show	Frédéric Bartholdi	Episode: "Frédéric Bartholdi"	
2017	Teenage Mutant Ninja Turtles	Dr. Mindstrong	Episode: "The Impossible Desert"	
2018	The Predator Holiday Special	Blitzen, Prancer, Larry, and Santa's other reindeer	Television special	
2019	Cannon Busters	Additional Voices	English dub	
2020	ThunderCats Roar	Snowman	Episode: "The Horror of Hook Mountain"	
2020–24	Lego Monkie Kid	Pigsy, Yin, Zhu Baije, Yellowtusk Elephant, additional voices		
2021	Jurassic World Camp Cretaceous	Hawkes, Reed		
2021–24	Arcane	Vern, Hoskel, Harold	7 episodes	
2021–24	What If...?	Additional Voices	9 episodes	
2024	Twilight of the Gods	Farnir	Episode: "The Worm"	
2025	Love, Death & Robots	Tom	Episode: "For He Can Creep"	
2025	Eyes of Wakanda	Additional Voices	3 episodes	

=== Anime ===
List of voice performances in anime
Year	Title	Role	Note(s)
2007	Highlander: The Search for Vengeance	Malike, additional voices	English dub
2012	Berserk: The Golden Age Arc I – The Egg of the King	Bazuso	English dub
2013	009 Re:Cyborg	004 / Albert Heinrich	English dub
2014	Mobile Suit Gundam Unicorn	Ronan Marcenas	English dub
2022	Bastard!! Heavy Metal, Dark Fantasy	Werewolf, Ba Thory, Ida Deesna	English dub
2022	Boruto: Naruto Next Generations	Boro	English dub
2023	Digimon Adventure	Gabumon	English dub
2023	Bleach: Thousand-Year Blood War	Gerard Valkyrie	English dub
2024	Code Geass: Rozé of the Recapture	Stanley Vonbraun	

=== Live action ===
List of acting performances in film
Year	Title	Role	Note(s)
2016	Girl Meets World	Laptop Narrator	Episode: "Girl Meets Her Monster"

=== Film ===
List of voice performances in films
Year	Title	Role	Notes	Source
2010	Superman/Batman: Apocalypse	Bearded Longshoreman	Direct-to-video	
2012	The Lorax	1st Commercial Guy		
2012	Superman vs. The Elite	Shock Trooper	Direct-to-video	
2015	Batman Unlimited: Monster Mayhem	Clayface	Direct-to-video	
2016	Bling	Police No. 1, Boxer	English dub	
2016	Batman Unlimited: Mechs vs. Mutants	Clayface, Chemo, Hush	Direct-to-video	
2018	Bilal: A New Breed of Hero	Hamza	English dub	
2019	The Queen's Corgi	Butch	US dub	
2019	Scooby-Doo! Return to Zombie Island	Ferry Captain, Driver	Direct-to-video	
2020	Mortal Kombat Legends: Scorpion's Revenge	Raiden, Lin Kuei Warrior	Direct-to-video	
2021	DC Showcase: The Losers	Gunner, Sarge	Direct-to-video	
2021	Mortal Kombat Legends: Battle of the Realms	Raiden, Kintaro, Sektor	Direct-to-video	
2023	Mortal Kombat Legends: Cage Match	Raiden, Bus Driver	Direct-to-video	

=== Video games ===
List of voice performances in video games
Year	Title	Role	Notes	Source
2008	Ratchet & Clank Future: Quest for Booty	Angstrom Darkwater		
2008	White Knight Chronicles	Rapacci		
2009	G.I. Joe: Rise of Cobra	Stalker		
2009	Marvel: Ultimate Alliance 2	Wonder Man		
2009	Brütal Legend	Watt-R-Boys		
2009	Madagascar Kartz	B.O.B.		
2010	Resonance of Fate	Cardinal Garigliano	Credited as David Mitchell	
2010	Metro 2033	Ulman, Additional voices		
2010	Spider-Man: Shattered Dimensions	Additional voices		
2010	Blade Kitten	Hundert Tonne		
2010	Fallout: New Vegas	Festus, Dog / God	Dead Money DLC	
2011	Kung Fu Panda 2	Master Croc		
2011	Dungeon Siege III	Reinhart Manx		
2011	Spider-Man: Edge of Time	Doctor Octopus, additional voices		
2011	Star Wars: The Old Republic	Various		
2012	Kingdoms of Amalur: Reckoning	Grim Onwig, additional voices		
2012	The Amazing Spider-Man	Additional voices		
2012	The Secret World	Joe Slater, Red		
2012	Resident Evil 6	BSAA Soldiers		
2012	Halo 4	Additional voices		
2013	Metro: Last Light	Ulman		
2013	Fuse	William Fable		
2013	Deadpool	Phaser, Clones		
2013	Grand Theft Auto V	The Local Population		
2013	Batman: Arkham Origins	Criminals, Penguin Thugs, Prisoners		
2013	Ratchet & Clank: Into the Nexus	Announcer, Thug No. 1		
2013	Bravely Default	Ciggma Khint		
2013–16	Skylanders series	Sharpfin, Chopper, Dream Sheep, Imaginators, Knight Doomlander, additional voices		
2014	Titanfall	Cheng "Bish" Lorck		
2014	Infamous: Second Son	Police Officer No. 1, Russian Bully No. 2		
2014	WildStar	Various		
2014	Enemy Front	"Wild Bill" Donovan		
2014	Defense Grid 2	Colonel Rissler		
2014	Project Spark	Karlsnor		
2014	Alien: Isolation	Ash		
2014	Call of Duty: Advanced Warfare	Additional voices		
2014	Far Cry 4	Golden Path Soldiers, additional voices		
2015	Pillars of Eternity	Narrator, Durance		
2015	Batman: Arkham Knight	Henchmen		
2015	Lego Dimensions	Tin Man		
2015	Halo 5: Guardians	Additional voices		
2015	Call of Duty: Black Ops III	Additional voices		
2015	Fallout 4	Male Gunners, Mr. Gutsy		
2016	XCOM 2	US Soldier		
2016	World of Warcraft: Legion	Kayn Sunfury		
2016	Mafia III	Marcano Informant No. 2, Irish Sniper No. 1		
2016	Final Fantasy XV	Dino Ghiranze, additional voices		
2017	Halo Wars 2	Additional voices		
2017	Farpoint	Wanderer		
2017	Batman: The Enemy Within	Willy, Goon 1, Chip, Generic Male		
2017	Knack II	Additional voices		
2017	Marvel vs. Capcom: Infinite	Announcer		
2017	Middle-earth: Shadow of War	Nemesis Orcs		
2018	Spider-Man	Shocker		
2018	Lego DC Super-Villains	Ventriloquist		
2018	Spyro Reignited Trilogy	Bentley		
2018	Red Dead Redemption 2	The Local Population		
2018	Fallout 76	Mr. Gutsy, George Smith, Chef Silas, Apartment Renter, Enclave Officer 2		
2018	Darksiders III	Angel Soldier, Human		
2019	Metro Exodus	Mirsky		
2019	Dead or Alive 6	Ryu Hayabusa		
2019	Mortal Kombat 11	Geras, Sektor	Also in Aftermath and Ultimate	
2019	Rage 2	Chaz Morass, Wellspring Guards		
2019	Team Sonic Racing	Knuckles the Echidna	Replaces Travis Willingham	
2019	Mario & Sonic at the Olympic Games Tokyo 2020	Knuckles the Echidna	Replaces Travis Willingham	
2019	Fire Emblem: Three Houses	Alois Rangeld, Lonato Gildas Gaspard	Credited as Raymond K. Essel	
2019	Judgment	Additional voices		
2019	Catherine: Full Body	Steve Delhomme		
2019	Daemon X Machina	Crimson Lord		
2019	The Outer Worlds	Vicar Maximillian DeSoto		
2020	Tell Me Why	Sam Kansky / Officer Greggs		
2020	Mafia: Definitive Edition	Additional voices		
2020	Yakuza: Like A Dragon	Additional voices	Credited as Dave Mitchell	
2020	Call of Duty: Black Ops Cold War	Additional voices		
2022	Lost Judgment	Yasushi Akaike		
2022	Fire Emblem Warriors: Three Hopes	Alois Rangeld, Lonato Gildas Gaspard		
2022	Genshin Impact	Pulcinella		
2022	Sonic Frontiers	Knuckles the Echidna	Credited as David Mitchell	
2023	Octopath Traveler II	Additional voices		
2023	Hi-Fi Rush	QA-1MIL, ES-101, SBR-001 #1, DUM-1E, O5-KAR, GNR-FL0, SBR-CUR, GNR-020, BES-102		
2023	The Legend of Heroes: Trails into Reverie	F. Novartis, Soldiers & Citizens of Zemuria		
2023	Armored Core VI: Fires of Rubicon	"Honest" Brute, Additional voices		
2023	Call of Duty: Modern Warfare III	Victor Zakhaev		
2023	Sonic Dream Team	Knuckles the Echidna		
2023	Like a Dragon Gaiden: The Man Who Erased His Name	Additional voices		
2023	Teenage Mutant Ninja Turtles: Splintered Fate	Bebop		
2024	Final Fantasy VII Rebirth	Dyne		
2024	Like a Dragon: Infinite Wealth	Additional voices		
2024	Persona 3 Reload	Additional voices		
2024	Fortnite: Battle Royale	Ares		
2024	Unicorn Overlord	Beaumont		
2024	Hades II	Hephaestus		
2024	Call of Duty: Black Ops 6	Klaus		
2024	Sonic X Shadow Generations	Knuckles the Echidna	Dubbing over Travis Willingham	
2025	Avowed	Pere Quilicci, Other		
2025	Bleach Rebirth of Souls	Soul Reaper (Male)	English version	
2025	Mortal Kombat 1: Definitive Edition	Sektor		
2025	Dune: Awakening	Cpt. Tighe Skorda, Tyg Rolsum, Justis Clagg, Rodrigo, Phin O'Garee, Taron, Sgt. Creel, Additional Voices		
2025	Tony Hawk's Pro Skater 3 + 4			
2025	Towa and the Guardians of the Sacred Tree	Magatsu, Senka		
2025	Sonic Racing: CrossWorlds	Knuckles the Echidna	English version	
2025	Digimon Story: Time Stranger	Additional voices		
2025	Battlefield 6	TJ Berkeley, British Soldier #1, Allied Soldiers, Pax Soldiers, Brooklyn Civilians		
2026	Teenage Mutant Ninja Turtles: Empire City	Bebop		

=== Audio drama ===
List of voice and dubbing performances in audio dramas
Year	Title	Role	Notes	Source
2026	Sonic the Hedgehog Presents: The Chaotix Casefiles	Knuckles the Echidna, additional voices		
