= Brian T. Delaney =

American actor

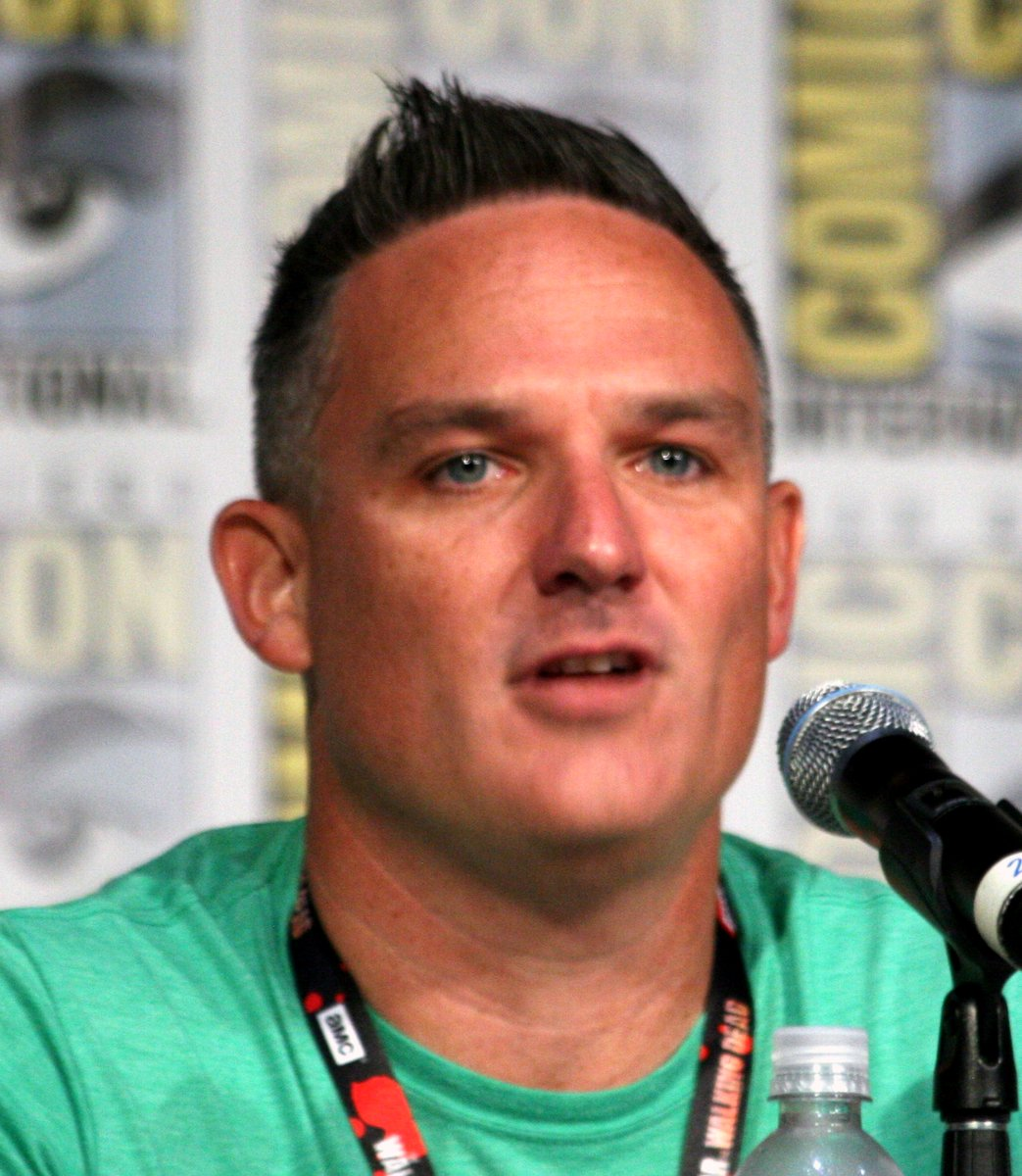
- Delaney at San Diego Comic-Con 2016
- Occupation: Actor
- Years active: 2002–Present
- Agent: CESD

Brian T. Delaney is an American actor known for voicing Scarecrow on Batman Unlimited and the male Sole Survivor in Fallout 4.

== Filmography ==
=== Film ===
List of voice performances in feature films
Year	Title	Role	Notes	Source
2011	Hoodwinked Too! Hood vs. Evil	Additional Voices	Uncredited	
2011	Mr. Popper's Penguins	Young Tom Popper Sr.		
2012	Total Recall	ATC Dispatcher Voice		
2013	Star Trek Into Darkness	Additional Voices		
2013	Legends of Oz: Dorothy's Return	Additional Voices		
2015	Minions	Additional Voices		
2015	Hotel Transylvania 2	Additional Voices		
2016	The Secret Life of Pets	Additional Voices		
2017	Resident Evil: Vendetta	Soldiers		
2017	Despicable Me 3	Commercial Announcer, Military Officer, Additional Voices		
2018	Hotel Transylvania 3	Additional Voices		
2018	The Grinch	Additional Voices		
2019	Uglydolls	Additional Voices		
2019	The Secret Life of Pets 2	Additional Voices		
2019	The Angry Birds Movie 2	Pigs	Uncredited	
2021	Sing 2	Additional Voices		
2021	Rumble	Burly Guy #1		
2022	Marmaduke	Additional Voices	Netflix film	
2022	The Sea Beast	Jim Nickelbones	Netflix film	

List of voice performances in direct-to-video and television films
Year	Title	Role	Notes	Source
2015	Batman Unlimited: Monster Mayhem	Scarecrow		
2017	Justice League Dark	Husband, Shroud Leader		
2021	Injustice	Hal Jordan / Green Lantern		

=== Television ===
List of voice performances in television
Year	Series	Role	Notes	Source
2011–13	Mad	Various	10 episodes	
2013	Good Luck Charlie	Actor #2	Episode: "The Bug Prom"	
2014	Hot in Cleveland	David Beckham	Episode: "The Animated Episode"	
2015	Batman Unlimited	Scarecrow	3 episodes	
2015–16	The Odd Couple	Caller	Uncredited; 3 episodes	
2016	Bunnicula	Randill	Episode: "Collar Me Crazy"	
2017	Bizaardvark	Keyboard Camp Guy	Episode: "Paige's Birthday Is Gonna Be Great!"	
2017	Stuck in the Middle	Harley's Imagination V.O.	Episode: "Stuck in a Gold Medal Performance"	
2018	Voltron: Legendary Defender	Escort Sentry	2 episodes	
2020	Archer	Kyle	Episode: "The Double Date"	
2021	Love, Death & Robots	Pilot	Episode: "Life Hutch"	
2021	Tom and Jerry in New York	Chapman, Zoo Guard	Episode: "Museum Peace/Here Kite-y Kite-y/Street Wise Guys/Chameleon Story"	
2021	What If...?	Peter Quill	2 episodes	
2022	She-Hulk: Attorney at Law	K.E.V.I.N.	Uncredited; Episode: "Whose Show Is This?"	

=== Video games ===
List of voice performances in video games
Year	Title	Role	Notes	Source
2008	Kung Fu Panda	Master Mantis		Resume
2008	007: Quantum of Solace	American Mercenaries		Resume
2008	Kung Fu Panda: Legendary Warriors	Master Mantis, Baboon Minion #2		
2009	Aion: The Tower of Eternity	Icaronix		Resume
2011	Need for Speed: The Run	Highway Patrol Officer		Resume
2012	Halo 4	Roland	Also motion capture	Resume
2012	Call of Duty: Black Ops II	Australian Mercs		Resume
2012	Dishonored	Aristocrat, Wallace		Resume
2011	Kinect Sports: Season Two	Ski PR Announcer		Resume
2012	Wreck-It Ralph	Wreck-It Ralph	Grouped under "Featuring the Voice Talents of"	
2012	Sonic & All-Stars Racing Transformed	Wreck-It Ralph	Grouped under "Featuring the Voice Talents of"	
2013	Disney Infinity	Wreck-It Ralph		
2014	Titanfall	Militia Soldiers		
2014	Infamous Second Son	Emilio Brunberg, Bennett, Correspondent		
2014	WildStar	Emperor Myrcalus, Mordesh Male, The Entity		
2015	Batman: Arkham Knight	Militia #6, Fireman #3		
2015	Disney Infinity 3.0	Wreck-It Ralph		
2015	Halo 5: Guardians	Roland	Also motion capture	
2015	Fallout 4	Sole Survivor (Male)		
2016	Hitman	Silvio Caruso		
2016	Mighty No. 9	Mighty No. 5 Battalion		
2017	Fortnite	Jonesy	Fortnite: Save the World only	
2017	Horizon Zero Dawn	Enjuk	The Frozen Wilds DLC	
2019	Days Gone	Additional Voices	Uncredited	
2019	Call of Duty: Modern Warfare	Additional Voices		
2019	Destiny 2: Shadowkeep	Saint-14		
2020	Guardian Tales	Garam		
2020	Destiny 2: Beyond Light	Saint-14		
2022	Destiny 2: The Witch Queen	Saint-14, Clovis Bray AI, Praksis		
2022	The Callisto Protocol	Additional Voices		
2026	Honkai: Star Rail	Welt Yang	Replaced Corey Landis	In game credit

=== Live-action ===
List of acting performances in film and television
Year	Title	Role	Notes	Source
2002	Hack	Troy Pappas	Episode: "Bad Choices"	Resume
2004	Jersey Girl	Nurse #2		Resume
2004	The 24th Day	Simon		Resume
2006	Shopping in the Afterlife	Charlie	Short film	Resume
2006	How I Met Your Mother	Drunk Guy	Episode: "Single Stamina"	Resume
2007	Crossing Jordan	Uni	3 episodes	Resume
2008	Universal Signs	Police Officer		Resume
2010	All My Children	Surgeon	2 episodes	Resume
2011–13	The Tonight Show with Jay Leno	Various	4 episodes	Resume
2012	The Young and the Restless	Anesthesiologist	1 episode	Resume
