= Batman Unlimited: Mechs vs. Mutants =

- Directed by: Curt Geda
- Screenplay by: Kevin Burke; Chris "Doc" Wyatt
- Produced by: Curt Geda; Sam Register; Benjamin Melniker; Michael Uslan
- Starring: Roger Craig Smith; Oded Fehr; Dana Snyder; Lucien Dodge
- Edited by: Bruce A. King
- Music by: Kevin Riepl
- Production companies: Warner Bros. Animation; DC Entertainment
- Distributed by: Warner Home Video
- Release dates: July 24, 2016 (San Diego Comic-Con); August 30, 2016 (Digital); September 13, 2016 (DVD)
- Running time: 72 minutes
- Country: United States
- Language: English

Batman Unlimited: Mechs vs. Mutants is an American animated superhero film and the third and final entry in the Batman Unlimited series. It premiered on July 24, 2016, at San Diego Comic-Con, to be followed by a digital release on August 30 and a DVD release on September 13.

== Plot ==
Damian, the new Robin, is upset after failing to stop the Joker the previous evening and being humiliated after he fell off a building and had to be saved by Batman, which was caught by a video blogger and posted on the Internet. Alfred Pennyworth tries to assure him that he is still learning, though Damian wishes he could talk to someone else who has been through the Robin training as Red Robin is away with his team.

In the Arctic, the Penguin, who has been in exile following the events of Batman Unlimited: Animal Instincts, is depressed at having lost everything. His only companions are Mr. Freeze and Buzz, a penguin who seems to understand Oswald's predicament. Freeze tries to repel a group of oil drillers near his ice cave, using one of his inventions to mutate an isopod into a gigantic monster to attack them, though it is ultimately defeated. The Penguin sees a way to capitalize on this, and encourages Freeze to take him back to Gotham where he assures Freeze the means to achieve his goals.

Back in Gotham, Bruce and Damian are attending a technology showcase at Wayne Tower where Kirk Langstrom reveals a new drilling mech capable of melting rock to mine more easily. Bruce receives a call from Alfred that someone is attempting to break into Arkham Asylum. Oliver Queen, who is present at the showcase, sees them leave and follows them.

At Arkham, the Penguin and Freeze drill into the asylum and free Bane, Chemo, Killer Croc and Clayface, before successfully escaping. At their undersea cave hideout, Freeze uses Bane's super-steroid Venom, Clayface's protoplasm, and Chemo's toxic waste to create a serum to transform Killer Croc and Chemo into gigantic ice monsters who work together to freeze Gotham.

While on their way to Freeze's hideout, Batman and Robin see the mutated supervillains, and unsuccessfully attempt to stop them. Meanwhile, Freeze and Penguin turn on each other, both wanting to eliminate their rivals for control of Gotham. Buzz however has stolen samples of Freeze's formula, which Bane and Clayface use to turn themselves into monsters. Despite his warning about the effects of the serum, Freeze is easily dispatched and Penguin sends Bane and Clayface after Batman. Bane, however, has a score to settle with Croc, who sold him out to the Gotham Police, and attacks him. Clayface locates Batman and Robin and attacks them, only to have Freeze's formula alter his body, turning him into a giant lava monster.

Batman gives the key to the Batmobile to Robin and tells him to distract Lava-Clayface, while he goes to Wayne Enterprises to retrieve a giant Bat-Mech created by Langstrom. Green Arrow arrives and reveals that he had Langstrom build an Arrow-Mech for him, after receiving a contract from Queen Industries for research and development. Batman goes to deal with Croc and Bane, while Green Arrow deals with Chemo. Batman then sends Langstrom to go help Robin, who was unable to stop Lava-Clayface, who then, with Flash and Nightwing, build a special laser cannon.

The two heroes engage the trio of monsters; Batman quickly defeats Killer Croc, who with the serum's effects wear off, shrinking Croc back to normal, and while Green Arrow destroys Chemo's ice blaster, he struggles against Chemo himself. Meanwhile, Freeze, guilty over his manipulation and betrayal by the Penguin, aids the heroes in perfecting their cannon to use against Clayface. After Batman defeats Bane, he goes to help Green Arrow battle Chemo, whom they successfully defeat and return to normal. Afterwards, the Penguin and Buzz try to escape, but are captured by the Bat-Mech.

The Penguin and his cohorts are arrested, along with Freeze. They are sent back to Arkham, while Buzz is sent to a zoo, meeting a female penguin who falls in love with him, and Langstrom starts to repair and upgrade the mechs.

The other heroes leave the Batcave and Batman congratulates Robin on doing a good job, with him having become more confident than before. Meanwhile, Clayface escapes his ice prison and slinks into the sewers.

== Voice cast ==
- Roger Craig Smith as Batman/Bruce Wayne
- Oded Fehr as Mr. Freeze
- Lucien Dodge as Robin/Damian Wayne
- Dana Snyder as Penguin, Buzz
- Chris Diamantopoulos as Green Arrow/Oliver Queen, Cobblepot Guard (uncredited)
- Phil LaMarr as Kirk Langstrom, Arkham Asylum Guard (uncredited)
- Will Friedle as Nightwing/Dick Grayson
- Charlie Schlatter as The Flash/Barry Allen
- Carlos Alazraqui as Bane
- John DiMaggio as Killer Croc, Sam Lane
- Dave B. Mitchell as Clayface, Hush (uncredited), Chemo (uncredited)
- Troy Baker as Joker, Two-Face
- Alastair Duncan as Alfred Pennyworth, Mad Hatter (uncredited)
- Richard Epcar as Commissioner James Gordon
