= Orca (DC Comics) =

- The Grace Balin incarnation of Orca as depicted in Nightwing (vol. 4) #12 (March 2017). Art by Marcus To (penciller/inker) and Chris Sotomayor (colorist).

Publication information
- Publisher: DC Comics
- First appearance: Batman #579 (July 2000)
- Created by: Larry Hama (writer); Scott McDaniel (artist)

In-story information
- Alter ego: Grace Balin; Dean Toye
- Species: Metahuman
- Team affiliations: Rogues Gallery; United States Military; Aquamarines
- Abilities: (Both): Superhuman strength, stamina, durability, reflexes, and swimming; Enhanced olfactory sense; Sharp fangs and claws; (Balin): Marine biology; Gene therapy; (Toye): Transformation; Military mastery

Orca is the name of two fictional characters who appear in American comic books published by DC Comics, commonly known as one of the adversaries to the superhero Batman.

== Publication history ==
The Grace Balin incarnation of Orca first appeared in Batman #579 (July 2000) and was created by Larry Hama and Scott McDaniel.

The Dean Toye incarnation of Orca first appeared in Aquaman (vol. 8) #12 (February 2017), and was created by Dan Abnett and Philippe Briones.

== Fictional character biography ==
=== Grace Balin ===
Grace Balin is a brilliant marine biologist left paralyzed from the waist down after an accident, leaving her dependent on a wheelchair. She begins a research project into the potential uses of orca spinal tissue to help disabled people like herself regain the ability to walk, but the project is stripped of funding when her employer, the Gotham Aquarium, is sold to a businesswoman who plans to demolish it for land redevelopment.

An attempt to test her incomplete spinal serum on her own injuries causes Balin to transform into a human-orca hybrid. She also discovers that, with concentration, she can switch between her orca and human bodies, though turning human also restores her paralysis. In need of money to continue her research, Orca commits a series of robberies targeting the company responsible for ruining her life; this continues until she suffers gunshot wounds during a botched job and nearly dies. With no other choice, Batman honors Orca's wish to inject her with the rest of the incomplete serum. This causes Orca to permanently lose her humanity.

Now fully transformed, Orca swims away to live as an animal. In One Year Later, Orca is found dead in the sewers under Gotham City. She appears to have been shot in the head by Harvey Dent, although Batman is convinced Dent is not the true killer. Orca's murder was orchestrated by the Great White Shark, who plans on becoming the top crime boss in Gotham.

Orca is reintroduced in Nightwing (vol. 4) #11, where she is a part of a criminal group in Bludhaven called the Whale's Enders and is ordered to kill Nightwing. Orca was formerly a member of the Run-Offs, a rehab group for former Gotham supervillains, but left because she considered herself too much of a monster to relate to them.

=== Dean Toye ===
Sergeant Dean Toye is a member of the Aquamarines, task-forced military operations trained and transformed to combat Atlantis in case of a crisis. As the second-in-command to Major Rhonda Ricoh who has the codename of "Great White", Orca and the Aquamarines are dispatched by the government to kill Aquaman.

== Powers and abilities ==
Both Orcas possess immense physical attributes, an enhanced sense of smell, and the ability to operate underwater. However, they must periodically rehydrate themselves to avoid drying out.

== In other media ==
- The Grace Balin incarnation of Orca appears in The Lego Batman Movie, voiced by Laura Kightlinger.
- The Grace Balin incarnation of Orca appears as a character summon in Scribblenauts Unmasked: A DC Comics Adventure.
- The Grace Balin incarnation of Orca appears in Lego Dimensions via The Lego Batman Movie DLC pack.
- The Grace Balin incarnation of Orca appears in the Injustice 2 prequel comic. This version is a member of Ra's al Ghul's Suicide Squad and lover of squad-mate Killer Croc, who she later has a child with and leaves the Squad to live a normal life.
