= Charlie Schlatter =

American actor

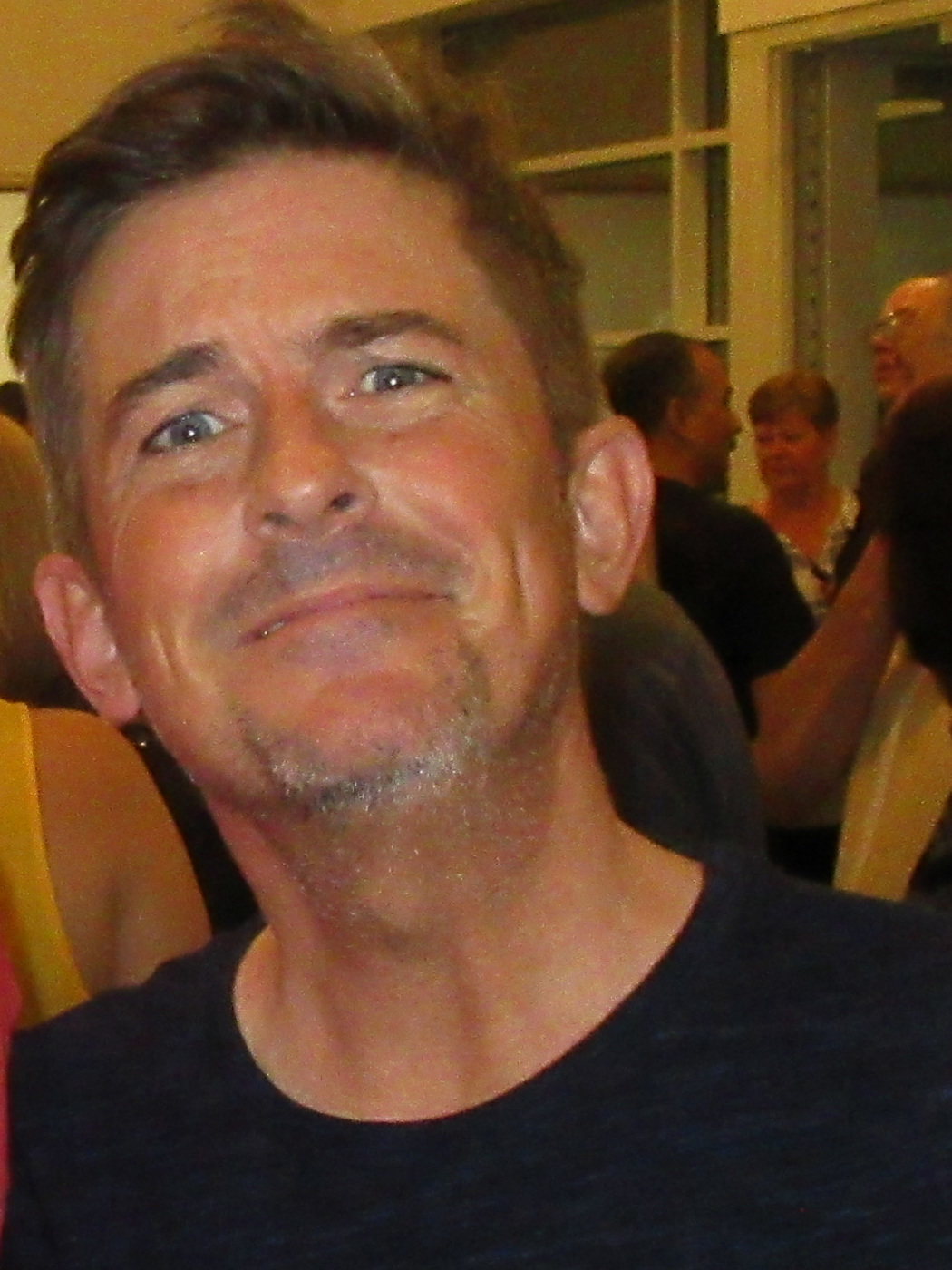
- Schlatter in 2016
- Other name: Charlie Schlatter
- Occupation: Actor
- Years active: 1987–present
- Known for: Diagnosis: Murder; Kick Buttowski: Suburban Daredevil
- Spouse: Colleen Gunderson (m. 1994)
- Children: 3

Charlie Schlatter is an American actor who has appeared in several films and television series. He is best known for his role as Dr. Jesse Travis, the resident student of Dr. Mark Sloan (played by Dick Van Dyke) on the CBS series Diagnosis: Murder. Since the 1990s, he has continued to work mainly as a voice actor, with roles such as the Flash in various media, the titular character on Kick Buttowski: Suburban Daredevil and Wonder-Red in The Wonderful 101.

== Early life ==
Raised in Englewood, New Jersey, and Fair Lawn, New Jersey, he got his start in acting at Fair Lawn High School. He reportedly only auditioned for the school play Oliver! to impress a girl. He received the lead part of Oliver Twist.

Schlatter attended Ithaca College. He later earned a B.F.A. in musical theater. He starred in numerous school plays and became a skilled musician, playing guitar, drums and piano. He also began writing songs.

== Career ==
Schlatter was spotted by a casting director during a performance in 1987 and was asked to audition for Bright Lights, Big City. This led to his first film appearance, as the younger brother of Michael J. Fox.

He starred in 1988's Heartbreak Hotel (directed by Chris Columbus) where his character kidnaps Elvis Presley in an effort to make his mother (Tuesday Weld) happy. His most highly acclaimed role was in the 1988 comedy 18 Again!. His 18-year-old character swaps body and mind with his 81-year-old grandfather, played by George Burns. His work in this film was described as "displaying enormous range and extraordinary skill as an actor in his comedic starring role,"

He also starred in Australian romance film The Delinquents (1989) opposite Kylie Minogue. In 1990, he was cast in the role of Ferris Bueller for NBC's sitcom Ferris Bueller alongside Jennifer Aniston, based on the John Hughes film Ferris Bueller's Day Off. In 1992, he co-starred in Sunset Heat with Michael Paré, Dennis Hopper and Adam Ant. In 1994, he appeared in Police Academy: Mission to Moscow as Cadet Kyle Connors.

In late 1995, Schlatter began his role as Dr. Jesse Travis on the television series Diagnosis: Murder, opposite Dick Van Dyke, who was impressed with his performance. His character was introduced as a comic relief character in the third season after Scott Baio's character moved to Colorado and never returned. He remained on the show for the next six seasons until the series was cancelled in 2001. During the series, he also wrote the episode "A Resting Place." After the series' ending, he and Van Dyke remain close friends, who continues to visit him, Schlatter's wife Colleen and their three children. He was also one of the participants at his acting mentor's 90th birthday party on December 13, 2015, at Disneyland in Anaheim, California. He said in a 2017 interview on Acast.com, if he is still friends with the then 91-year-old Van Dyke: "Yeah, I know! I probably owe him a call or he probably owes me a call ... I don't know! It's been a little while. No, he's the best!"

In early 2007, he appeared in the films Out at the Wedding and Resurrection Mary.

In 2014, he appeared as a guest star on the NCIS season 11 episode "Shooter," playing Lorne Davis. In 2015, he became the narrator for truTV's video clip series Top Funniest starting in the third season.

=== Animation ===
Since the early 1990s, Schlatter would begin voicing characters in many series. Among his roles were the Flash (Wally West) in Superman: The Animated Series, the Flash (Barry Allen) in The Batman and Batman Unlimited: Animal Instincts, the title character in Kick Buttowski: Suburban Daredevil, Ace Bunny in Loonatics Unleashed, Kevin Levin in Ben 10, Hawk in A.T.O.M., Tommy Cadle in Pet Alien, Chris Kirkman in Random! Cartoons (a character he would later voice in the pilot of Bravest Warriors), Cameron in Bratz, and Doctor Mindbender, Wild Bill and Lift-Ticket in G.I. Joe: Renegades. In later Ben 10 series, Schlatter was replaced with Greg Cipes.

Schlatter was originally cast for the role of Philip J. Fry on Futurama, but Billy West got the role due to a casting change.

Schlatter was the voice of Buzz Bee, the mascot of Honey Nut Cheerios, from 2004 to 2015.

He also voiced Timmy in the Nickelodeon version of Winx Club and various characters in The Loud House.

=== Video games ===
Schlatter was the voice of Major Raikov in Metal Gear Solid 3: Snake Eater as well as Raiden in the short film Metal Gear Raiden: Snake Eraser included on the second disk of the Metal Gear Solid 3: Subsistence game. He voiced Specter, the villain in the game Ape Escape 3. In 2012, he also voiced Finn in the game Sorcery.

In 2004, he voiced Aatius Vedrix, Lucius Vulso, Tarakh, Steward Daedakovoon, Znink Flatzazzle and Dunn Coldbrow in EverQuest II. He voiced Robin and reprised his role as the Flash in Lego Batman 2: DC Super Heroes, Lego Batman: The Movie – DC Super Heroes Unite, Lego Batman 3: Beyond Gotham and Lego Dimensions. He also voiced the main protagonist Wonder-Red in The Wonderful 101.

== Personal life ==
Schlatter dated Jennifer Aniston in 1990, during the shooting of the Ferris Bueller television series. He married Colleen Gunderson in 1994 and they have two daughters and a son.

== Filmography ==
=== Live-action ===
==== Film ====
| Year | Title | Role | Notes |
|---|---|---|---|
| 1988 | Bright Lights, Big City | Michael Conway | |
| 1988 | 18 Again! | David Watson / Jack Watson | |
| 1988 | Heartbreak Hotel | Johnny Wolfe | |
| 1989 | The Delinquents | Brownie Hansen | |
| 1991 | All-American Murder | Artie Logan | Direct-to-video |
| 1992 | Sunset Heat | David | |
| 1994 | Police Academy: Mission to Moscow | Cadet Kyle Connors | |
| 1996 | Ed | Buddy | |
| 2003 | White Rush | Jay Gelb | |

==== Television ====
| Year | Title | Role | Notes |
|---|---|---|---|
| 1990–91 | Ferris Bueller | Ferris Bueller | 13 episodes |
| 1992 | Stormy Weathers | Squirrel | Television film |
| 1994 | Silk Stalkings | Junior Ballantine | Episode: "Where There's a Will" |
| 1995 | Too Something | Jeffrey | Episode: "Pilot" |
| 1995–2001 | Diagnosis: Murder | Dr. Jesse Travis | 137 episodes |
| 1997, 2002 | Touched by an Angel | Kevin Greeley | 2 episodes |
| 2004 | Miss Cast Away and the Island Girls | Mike Saunders | Television film |
| 2013 | Southland | Howard | Episode: "Bleed Out" |
| 2014 | NCIS | Lorne Davis | Episode: "Shooter" |
| 2016 | Goliath | Clerk Wilson | Episode: "Pride and Prejudice" |
| 2017 | Feud | Monte Westmore | Episode: "Abandoned!" |
| 2017 | Shameless | Dr. Dick | Episode: "Occupy Fiona" |
| 2021 | For All Mankind | Paul Michaels | 7 episodes |

=== Voice acting ===
==== Film ====
| Year | Title | Role | Notes |
|---|---|---|---|
| 2002 | Tom and Jerry: The Magic Ring | Chip | Direct-to-video |
| 2005 | Bratz: Rock Angelz | Cameron | Direct-to-video |
| 2010 | A Turtle's Tale: Sammy's Adventures | Hippie | |
| 2011 | The Little Engine That Could | Major | |
| 2013 | Winx Club 3D: Magical Adventure | Timmy | English dub |
| 2014 | Dragon Nest: Warrior's Dawn | Lambert | English dub |
| 2015 | Batman Unlimited: Animal Instincts | Barry Allen / The Flash | Direct-to-video |
| 2016 | Batman Unlimited: Mechs vs. Mutants | Barry Allen / The Flash | Direct-to-video |

==== Television ====
| Year | Title | Role | Notes |
|---|---|---|---|
| 1991 | Captain Planet and the Planeteers | Hoggish Greedly, Jr. | Episode: "Smog Hog" |
| 1992 | Fish Police | Tadpole | 6 episodes |
| 1996 | Jumanji | Wade Riley, Flint | Episode: "Love on the Rocks" |
| 1997 | Superman: The Animated Series | Wally West / Flash | Episode: "Speed Demons" |
| 2001 | Rugrats | Talent Show Host | Episode: "Dil Saver/Cooking with Phil & Lil/Piece of Cake" |
| 2001 | Butt-Ugly Martians | B-bop-A-Luna | 26 episodes |
| 2001–04 | Totally Spies! | Additional Voices | 52 episodes |
| 2003 | Clifford the Big Red Dog | Frank Williams | Episode: "Led Astray/Wedding Bell Blues" |
| 2004 | Jackie Chan Adventures | Rocko | Episode: "Dragon Scouts" |
| 2004 | Evil Con Carne | Tony, Trooper #3 | 2 episodes |
| 2004–07 | Pet Alien | Tommy Cadle, Clinton, Old Man Bitters, Bob, Dank | 52 episodes |
| 2005–06 | Bratz | Cameron | 16 episodes |
| 2005–07 | A.T.O.M. | Hawk, Stingfly | 12 episodes |
| 2005–07 | Loonatics Unleashed | Ace Bunny, Toby the Pizza Boy | 26 episodes |
| 2006–07 | Codename: Kids Next Door | Numbuh 20,000 | 2 episodes |
| 2006–07 | Ben 10 | Kevin Levin, Devlin Levin | 4 episodes |
| 2007 | Kim Possible | Chino | 2 episodes |
| 2007–08 | The Batman | The Flash | 3 episodes |
| 2007–09 | Random! Cartoons | Various | 3 episodes |
| 2008 | Chowder | Dog Citizen, Skeleton | Episode: "Schnitzel Quits" |
| 2008 | The Life & Times of Tim | Additional Voices | Episode: "Senior Prom/Tim Fights an Old Man" |
| 2008–09 | The Fairly OddParents | Various | 3 episodes |
| 2008–13 | Phineas and Ferb | Additional Voices | 4 episodes |
| 2010–11 | G.I. Joe: Renegades | Doctor Mindbender, Wild Bill, Lift-Ticket, Cobra Security Chief, Guard #2 | 14 episodes |
| 2010–12 | Kick Buttowski: Suburban Daredevil | Kick Buttowski | 52 episodes |
| 2011 | Ben 10: Ultimate Alien | Tack, Plumber #3 | Episode: "Basic Training" |
| 2011–15 | Winx Club | Timmy, Prince Thoren | 109 episodes Nickelodeon version |
| 2013 | Curious George | Sam, Bruno the Magician, Store Clerk | 3 episodes |
| 2014 | The Boondocks | Plastic Surgeon, Cameraman | Episode: "Granddad Dates a Kardashian" |
| 2015 | Transformers: Robots in Disguise | Vertebreak | Episode: "Some Body, Any Body" |
| 2015 | TruTV Top Funniest | Narrator | 8 episodes |
| 2016–17 | Justice League Action | The Flash | 6 episodes |
| 2016–22 | The Loud House | Various | 7 episodes |
| 2017 | Avengers Assemble | Young Howard Stark | Episode: "New Year's Resolution" |
| 2020 | Scooby-Doo and Guess Who? | The Flash, Miner Forty-Niner, Announcer | 2 episodes |
| 2021 | DC Super Hero Girls | Toyman | 2 episodes |
| 2021–23 | Harriet the Spy | Simon "Sport" Rocque | 18 episodes |
| 2022–24 | Big Nate | Chad Applewhite | 19 episodes |
| 2024–25 | Hot Wheels Let's Race | Sidecar | 20 episodes |
| 2026 | Max & the Midknighs | Chad Applewhite | Episode: "The Great Crossover" |

==== Video games ====
| Year | Title | Role | Notes |
|---|---|---|---|
| 2004 | Shellshock: Nam '67 | Deuce | |
| 2004 | EverQuest II | Aatius Vedrix, Lucius Vulso, Tarahk, Steward Daedakovoon, Znink Flatzazzle, Dunn Coldbrow, Generic Male Froglok Merchant, Generic Male Troll Merchant, Generic Male Halfling Merchant, Generic Male High Elf, Generic Evil Eye Enemy, Generic Barbarian Enemy | |
| 2004 | Metal Gear Solid 3: Snake Eater | Major Raikov, Soldier | English version |
| 2005 | The Punisher | Tom, Crack Dealer, Chop Shop Worker, S.H.I.E.L.D. Agent, Prisoner | |
| 2005 | Bratz: Rock Angelz | Cameron | |
| 2005 | Neopets: The Darkest Faerie | Heermedjet, Meerouladen, Messenger | |
| 2006 | Ape Escape Academy | Specter | US English version |
| 2006 | Ape Escape 3 | Specter | US English version |
| 2006 | Over the Hedge | Milton the Mole | |
| 2006 | Gothic 3 | Additional Voices | |
| 2006 | Metal Gear Solid: Portable Ops | Raikov | English version |
| 2007 | Spider-Man 3 | Apocalypse Thug, Additional Voices | |
| 2007 | Ben 10: Protector of Earth | Kevin Levin | |
| 2007 | Bee Movie Game | Additional Voices | |
| 2008 | Kung Fu Panda | Rabbit #2, Rabbit #3 | |
| 2008 | Rise of the Argonauts | Additional Voices | |
| 2008 | SOCOM U.S. Navy SEALs: Confrontation | Tom Hamilton, VIP #2 | |
| 2008 | Madagascar: Escape 2 Africa | Additional Voices | |
| 2008 | Kung Fu Panda: Legendary Warriors | Rabbit #4, Rat Minion #1 | |
| 2012 | Sorcery | Finn | |
| 2012 | Lego Batman 2: DC Super Heroes | Tim Drake / Robin, The Flash, Damian Wayne | |
| 2013 | The Wonderful 101 | Wonder-Red, Arthur Wedgewood | English version |
| 2014 | Lego Batman 3: Beyond Gotham | Tim Drake / Robin, The Flash | |
| 2015 | Lego Ninjago: Shadow of Ronin | Kai | |
| 2015-2017 | Lego Dimensions | The Flash, Kai, Darreth, The Flash (The Lego Batman Movie) | |
| 2016 | Skylanders: Imaginators | Additional Voices | |
| 2020 | Mafia: Definitive Edition | Additional Voices | |
| 2021 | DC Super Hero Girls: Teen Power | Toyman | |
