= Richard Epcar =

American voice actor, voice director, and writer

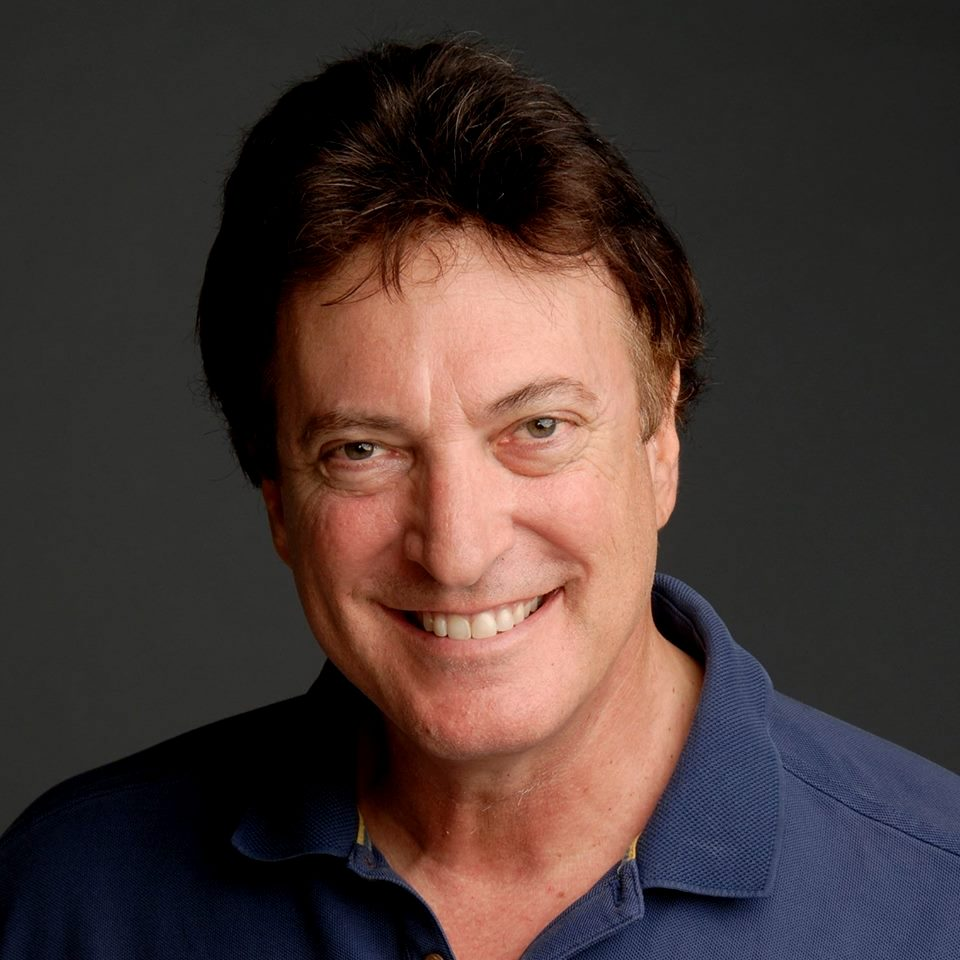
- Epcar in 2017
- Born: Richard Micheal Epcar; April 29, 1955 (age 71); Denver, Colorado, USA
- Other names: Richard George; Patrick Gilbert; Jonathan Alexander
- Education: University of Arizona
- Occupations: Voice actor, film director, writer
- Years active: 1980–present
- Spouse: Ellyn Stern (m. 1982)
- Children: 2
- Website: richardepcar.com

Richard Epcar is an American voice actor, voice director, and writer. Some of his major roles include Raiden in the Mortal Kombat franchise, The Joker in several projects (including Mortal Kombat vs. DC Universe, Injustice: Gods Among Us, Injustice 2 and Mortal Kombat 11), Yhwach and Zangetsu in Bleach, Bobobo-bo Bo-bobo in Bobobo-bo Bo-bobo, Etemon and Myotismon in Digimon, Batou in Ghost in the Shell, Xehanort/Ansem in Kingdom Hearts, Joseph Joestar in JoJo's Bizarre Adventure: Stardust Crusaders and JoJo's Bizarre Adventure: Diamond is Unbreakable, Black Ghost/Skull in Cyborg 009, Akuma in Street Fighter V (replacing Dave Mallow), Daisuke Jigen in Lupin the Third, Andrall in Gormiti Nature Unleashed, and Hercules in Pluto. He and fellow voice actress Ellyn Stern own and operate Epcar Entertainment, a voice-over production service company based in Los Angeles.

== Filmography ==
=== Anime ===
List of English dubbing performances in anime
Year	Title	Role	Notes	Source
1985	Robotech	Ben Dixon		
1994	Macross Plus	Guld Goa Bowman		
1999	Digimon Adventure	Etemon, Myotismon		
1999	Great Teacher Onizuka	Hajime Fukuroda		
2001	Digimon Adventure 02	Monochromon, Apemon, Triceramon, MaloMyotismon		
2001	Digimon Tamers	Sinduramon		
2002	Digimon Frontier	Snimon, Chamelemon, SuperStarmon		
2002	Speed Racer X	Racer X		
2002	Witch Hunter Robin	Kannosaki		
2002	Zentrix		Voice director	
2003	Lupin the Third Part II	Daisuke Jigen	TV series	
2003–05	Bobobo-bo Bo-bobo	Bobobo-bo Bo-bobo		
2004–10	Bleach	Zangetsu, Gō Koga, others		
2004–06	Ghost in the Shell: Stand Alone Complex	Batou		
2005	Kyo Kara Maoh	Baxter		
2006	Digimon Data Squad	Merukimon		
2006	Robotech: The Shadow Chronicles	Vince Grant		
2008	Lucky Star	Tadao Hiiragi, others		
2008	Blue Dragon	Killer Bat		
2009	Monster	Inspector Heinrich Lunge		
2010	Mobile Suit Gundam Unicorn	Daguza Mackle		
2013	Digimon Fusion	Etemon, Tuwarmon, others		
2014	Blood Lad	Wolf Daddy		
2014	Coppelion	Foreman Kurobe		
2015	Lupin the Third Part IV: The Italian Adventure	Daisuke Jigen	TV series	
2015	Nagi-Asu: A Lull in the Sea	Tomoru Sakishima		
2016	Hunter × Hunter	Bendot, Cherry (ep 5), others	2011 series	
2016	The Asterisk War	Kouichiro Toudou		
2017–18	JoJo's Bizarre Adventure: Stardust Crusaders	Joseph Joestar		
2018	Lupin the Third Part V	Daisuke Jigen	TV series	
2018–19	JoJo's Bizarre Adventure: Diamond Is Unbreakable	Joseph Joestar		
2018	Back Street Girls: Gokudolls	Kimanjiro Inugane		
2019	Carole & Tuesday	Schwartz		
2020–22	Ghost in the Shell: SAC 2045	Batou		
2022	Lupin the Third Part 6	Daisuke Jigen	TV series	
2022	Yashahime: Princess Half-Demon	Northern Demon Slayer leader		
2022–present	Bleach: Thousand-Year Blood War	Yhwach, Zangetsu		
2023	Pluto	Hercules		

=== Other Animation ===
List of voice performances in animation
Year	Title	Role	Crew role, notes	Source
1997	X-Men: The Animated Series	Gladiator		
2008	The Mr. Men Show	Mr. Noisy		
2009–12	Huntik: Secrets & Seekers	Grier		
2012	The Legend of Korra	Captain Saikhan		
2017	Stitch & Ai	Wombat, Mr. Ding, Sage, Elder	Chinese production originally produced in English	

=== Film ===
List of voice and English dubbing performances in direct-to-video and television films
Year	Title	Role	Notes	Source
1996	Ghost in the Shell	Batou		Press
2003	Lupin the Third: The Mystery of Mamo	Daisuke Jigen		
2004	Muhammad: The Last Prophet	Abu Jahl, Tribal Leader 2, Counselor		
2004	Ghost in the Shell 2: Innocence	Batou		
2005	Digimon Tamers: Battle of Adventurers	Tamashiro, Guillmon, Mephistomon		
2005	The Avenging Apes of Africa	Morocco		
2006	Ghost in the Shell: Stand Alone Complex – Solid State Society	Batou		
2007	Shark Bait	Moe		
2008	The Blue Elephant	King Naresuan, Officer, Ajan		
2010	Space Dogs	Kazbek		
2014	Bayonetta: Bloody Fate	Narrator		
2014	Patema Inverted	Izamura		
2015	Batman Unlimited: Animal Instincts	Jim Gordon		
2015	Batman Unlimited: Monster Mayhem	Jim Gordon		
2016	Batman Unlimited: Mech vs. Mutants	Jim Gordon		
2018	Lupin the Third: Legend of the Gold of Babylon	Daisuke Jigen		
2019	Jigen's Gravestone	Inspector Zenigata		
2019	Goemon's Blood Spray	Inspector Zenigata		
2019	Lupin the Third: Blood Seal of the Eternal Mermaid	Daisuke Jigen		
2020	Lupin the Third: Goodbye Partner	Daisuke Jigen		
2020	Lupin III: The First	Daisuke Jigen		
2023	Once Upon a Studio	Little John	Short film	

=== Video games ===
List of voice and English dubbing performances in video games
Year	Title	Role	Crew role, notes	Source
1997	Ghost in the Shell	Batou		
2000	Galerians	Dr. Steiner, Dr. Lem, Gangster, Maintenance Man		
2000	Persona 2: Eternal Punishment	Baofu		
2001	Kessen II	Pang De	English dub	
2002	Warcraft III Reign of Chaos (video game)	Priest		
2003	Dynasty Warriors series	Dong Zhuo	English dub; 4 through 8	
2003	Dynasty Tactics 2	Lu Bu, Zhang Lu	English dub	
2004	Drakengard	Undine	English dub	
2004	Samurai Warriors	Shingen Takeda	English dub	
2005	Xenosaga Episode II	Ziggy	English dub	
2005	Beat Down: Fists of Vengeance	Wallace	English dub	
2005	Radiata Stories	Achilles	English dub	
2006	Kingdom Hearts II	Ansem	English dub	
2006	Atelier Iris 2: The Azoth of Destiny	Theodore, Palaxius		
2006	Xenosaga Episode III	Ziggy	English dub	
2006–07	.hack//G.U. series	Taichiro Sugai, Arena Announcer		
2007	Supreme Commander	Colonel Zachary Arnold		
2007	Blue Dragon	Jeeala, Heat-Wave Sai, King Ghost		
2008	Castle of Shikigami III	Batu Harai		
2008	Star Ocean: First Departure	Del Argosy (The Crimson Shield)		
2008	Mortal Kombat vs. DC Universe	Raiden, The Joker		
2008	Kingdom Hearts Re: Chain of Memories	Ansem		
2009	Star Ocean: Second Evolution	Gabriel		
2009	Kingdom Hearts 358/2 Days	Ansem		
2009	Tekken 6	Azazel	Scenario Campaign Cinematics	
2010	Transformers: War for Cybertron	Skywarp		
2010	Kingdom Hearts Birth by Sleep	Terra-Xehanort		
2010	StarCraft II: Wings of Liberty	Thor, Dark Templar		
2010	Sengoku Basara: Samurai Heroes	Kanbe Kuroda		
2011	Mortal Kombat	Raiden		Tweet
2011	Dead or Alive: Dimensions	Leon, Fame Douglas		
2011	Ace Combat: Assault Horizon Legacy	Ulrich Olsen (AWACS Keynote)		
2012	Tales of Graces f	Kurt Bessel		
2012	Spec Ops: The Line	Interrogator		
2012	Kingdom Hearts 3D: Dream Drop Distance	Ansem		
2012	Demons' Score	Satan, Berith, Dr. Alister		
2012	Mugen Souls	Shirogane/Sun Demon		
2013	Fire Emblem Awakening	Walhart		
2013	Naruto Shippuden: Ultimate Ninja Storm 3	Hanzo		
2013	Injustice: Gods Among Us	The Joker		Tweet
2013	Fuse	Raven Guard, Grigori		
2013	Marvel Heroes	Madison Jeffries		
2013	Saints Row IV	Terrorist Cyrus		
2013	Final Fantasy XIV: A Realm Reborn	Gaius van Baelsar, Ilberd Feare		
2013	Kingdom Hearts HD 1.5 Remix	Ansem		
2013	Bravely Default	Argent Heinkel		
2014	Earth Defense Force 2025	HQ		
2014	Smite	Poseidon		
2014	D4: Dark Dreams Don't Die	August Oldmann		
2014	Kingdom Hearts HD 2.5 Remix	Ansem, Terra-Xehanort	Also 1.5 + 2.5	
2015	Bladestorm: Nightmare	Narrator		
2015	Infinite Crisis	The Joker		
2015	Mortal Kombat X	Raiden		
2015	Pillars of Eternity	Caravan Master Odema		Tweet
2015	Ghost in the Shell: Stand Alone Complex – First Assault Online	Batou		
2016	Street Fighter V	Akuma		
2017	Kingdom Hearts HD 2.8 Final Chapter Prologue	Ansem, Terra-Xehanort		
2017	Kingdom Hearts HD 1.5 + 2.5 Remix	Ansem, Terra-Xehanort		
2017	Fire Emblem Heroes	Oliver, Hardin		
2017	Injustice 2	The Joker, Raiden (DLC)		Tweet
2017	Fire Emblem Echoes: Shadows of Valentia	Jedah	English voice	
2017	Persona 5	Principal Kobayakawa, additional voices		
2017	Tekken 7	Geese Howard	Added through DLC in the console versions and Round 2	Tweet
2018–19	Monster Hunter: World, Monster Hunter World: Iceborne	Admiral	English dub	Instagram
2019	Kingdom Hearts III	Ansem, Terra-Xehanort		
2019–20	Mortal Kombat 11	Raiden, The Joker (DLC)	Also in Aftermath and Ultimate	Instagram
2019	Marvel Ultimate Alliance 3: The Black Order	Sandman		
2019	Catherine: Full Body	Morgan Cortez		
2019	Daemon X Machina	Brigadier General	English Voice	
2020	Teppen	Akuma		
2020	Granblue Fantasy Versus	Eugen, Imperial Soldier		
2020	Yakuza: Like a Dragon	Additional voices		
2020	Kingdom Hearts: Melody of Memory	Terra-Xehanort		
2021	Guilty Gear Strive	Gabriel		
2022	Fire Emblem Warriors: Three Hopes	Count Bergliez		
2022	Star Ocean: The Divine Force	Lombert Klemrath		
2023	Octopath Traveler II	Additional voices		
2023	Master Detective Archives: Rain Code	Former CEO		
2023	Granblue Fantasy Versus: Rising	Eugen, Imperial Soldier		
2024	Like a Dragon: Infinite Wealth	Additional voices		
2024	Granblue Fantasy: Relink	Eugen		
2024	The Legend of Heroes: Trails Through Daybreak	Victor, Samuel Rocksmith		
2024	Batman: Arkham Shadow	Zurawski, John DeMarco		
2025	The Legend of Heroes: Trails Through Daybreak II	Victor, citizens		
2025	Fatal Fury: City of the Wolves	Geese Howard		
2025	Digimon Story: Time Stranger	Merukimon		
2026	Trails in the Sky 2nd Chapter	Morgan		
2026	The Legend of Zelda: Ocarina of Time	Great Deku Tree		

=== Live action ===
List of voice performances in live action series
Year	Title	Role	Crew role, notes	Source
1999	Power Rangers Lost Galaxy	Barbarax, Fishface		
2000	Power Rangers Lightspeed Rescue	Cyclopter		
2001	Power Rangers Time Force	Vexicon		

- Adventures in Voice Acting – Himself
- Big Bad Beetleborgs – Karato (as Richard George)
- Beetleborgs Metallix – Lightningborg (as Richard George)
- ER – Many Voices
- Gilmore Girls – Many Voices
- Glory Daze – Announcer
- Hercules – Many Voices
- JAG – Many Voices
- Masked Rider – Beetletron, Masked Rider Z-Cross/Masked Rider V-3 (as Richard George)
- Mighty Med- Mr. Terror (Voice only)
- Mighty Morphin Power Rangers – Shellshock, Mutitus, Babe Ruthless, Cyclops, Samurai Fan Man, Goatan (Lion voice), Primator (Zedd's Monster Mash), Invenusable Flytrap (Rangers Back in Time and The Wedding), Rhinoblaster (Football Season, The Wedding and Master Vile and the Metallic Armor), Miss Chief (2nd voice), Brick Bully (all uncredited roles)
- Power Rangers: Zeo – Bucket of Bolts, Defoliator, Autochthon, Protectron (all uncredited)
- Power Rangers: Turbo – Blazinator (uncredited)
- Power Rangers: In Space – Vacsacker (uncredited)
- Power Rangers: Wild Force – Bowling Org
- Xena – Many Voices
- VR Troopers – Col. Icebot, Slashbot, Dice Swordbot (2nd voice), Slice Swordbot (3rd voice), Frogbot, Cannonbot, Dark Heart, Chrome Dome, Graybot (with Zelton as him) (as Richard George)

Preceded by Mark Hamill (1992-present)	Actor to voice the Joker; 2008–present	Succeeded by Troy Baker (2013-present)
