= Killer Croc =

DC Comics character

- Killer Croc, as depicted in Suicide Squad Most Wanted: El Diablo and Killer Croc #3 (October 2016). Art by Brian Level (pencils and inks) and Beth Sotelo (colors).

Publication information
- Publisher: DC Comics
- First appearance: Cameo appearance: Detective Comics #523 (February 1983); Full appearance: Detective Comics #524 (March 1983)
- Created by: Gerry Conway (writer); Don Newton (artist); Gene Colan (artist)

In-story information
- Alter ego: Waylon Jones
- Species: Metahuman
- Team affiliations: Secret Society of Super Villains; Suicide Squad; Injustice League
- Notable aliases: Croc; King Croc
- Abilities: Superhuman strength, stamina, durability, speed, and senses; Hardened fangs, claws, and scales; Underwater aptitude; Regeneration; Proficiency in wrestling

Killer Croc (Waylon Jones) is a fictional character appearing in American comic books published by DC Comics. Created by Gerry Conway, Don Newton, and Gene Colan, the character was introduced in Detective Comics #523 (February 1983). He has become one of the most enduring enemies of the superhero Batman and belongs to the collective of adversaries that make up his rogues gallery.

Killer Croc is a former sideshow wrestler who has a rare genetic condition that gives him a reptilian appearance and superhuman strength. Driven insane by this, he turned to a life of crime, over time developing animalistic tendencies. The character has also been a member of the Suicide Squad, debuting in the fifth volume of the comic series revolving around the team, and a romantic interest of Enchantress. While typically portrayed as a supervillain, he has also been occasionally depicted as an antihero.

The character has been adapted into various media, most revolving around Batman. Killer Croc made his live-action debut in the 2016 DC Extended Universe film Suicide Squad, portrayed by Adewale Akinnuoye-Agbaje. A version of the character appeared in the third season of the Arrowverse series Batwoman, performed by Heidi Ben.

== Publication history ==
Killer Croc was created by writer Gerry Conway and artist Gene Colan. The character made cameo appearances in Detective Comics #523 (February 1983) and Batman #357 (March 1983), with his full first appearance in Detective Comics #524 (March 1983).

== Fictional character biography ==
=== Pre-Crisis ===
Waylon Jones was born with a rare form of atavism that imparted him with reptilian traits with his birth causing the death of his mother. He was raised by his aunt, an abusive alcoholic who called him names like "lizardboy" and "reptilian freak". Croc eventually killed his aunt and became a criminal in Gotham City. After committing several murders, he faced off against Batman and the new Robin, Jason Todd, who defeated him.

In these original, Pre-Crisis appearances, Killer Croc resembled a powerfully built man covered entirely in green scales, but was still basically human in his facial proportions and build. He was also originally depicted as killing Jason Todd's parents. This was later retconned to make Two-Face their murderer.

=== Post-Crisis ===
Killer Croc escapes custody, seeking revenge on Harvey Bullock and two others he blames for his prior imprisonment. His thirst for revenge driving him into madness. Evading authorities Croc finds refuge with an unhoused community within the old sewer systems. Batman finds the community and is nearly killed by Croc in a primal rage. Batman warns the group to leave, as the new water tunnels the city has set up will destroy their home when the lines open. Croc seemingly sacrificed himself holding the walls up from the rush of water, saving his friends in the process.

Croc miraculously survived, having been swept away into a storm drain. Living on rats and being isolated for months, drove him further into madness. Suffering from hallucinations of his past torment by bullies and his aunt, seeing their faces on a vagrant who wandered in his territory and attacks him, going into a further rampage that ends up in a shopping mall, where he attracts the attention of the police and the dynamic duo. After delivering several blows to Croc, Batman (Jean-Paul Valley) is distracted by a glimpse of Bane. Croc grabs onto Valley and nearly kills him. Bane tests his might against that of Croc and breaks both his arms. He is then put back into Arkham Asylum.

In the Knightfall saga, Bane orchestrates a jail break of Arkham and Croc is among the inmates that escape, taking refuge in the sewers, coming across Bane again, and attacks him on one of the ledges until it breaks and the two fall into the waters below ending the fight in a stalemate. Croc later returns, fully healed and thirsting for revenge finds himself not against Bane but Dick Grayson acting as Batman who dispatches the Killer Croc leaving him trussed up in a fishing trawl for the police. where he is returned to Arkham.

Killer Croc is summoned by a paranormal force to break out of Arkham and make his way to the Louisiana swamps. Batman follows him there, only to find that the mysterious force is actually Swamp Thing, who offers Croc a place in the swampland where he can finally give in to his animal side and live peacefully away from human persecution.

Killer Croc has appeared in both the "Hush" storyline and its chronological follow-up, Broken City. In the former, he is infected with a virus that greatly increases the rate of his devolution, 'overseeing' a kidnapping for Hush before Batman defeats him; this provides Batman's first clue that someone else is orchestrating events, as he knows that Croc is not smart enough to attempt a complex scheme like a kidnapping on his own due to the many variables. Though Killer Croc was briefly restored to his original form, the Mad Hatter, under Black Mask's orders, implanted Killer Croc with a device that made him loyal to Black Mask and caused the virus to return. Batman freed Croc from Black Mask's control. Croc attempted to take revenge on the Mad Hatter, but was stopped by Batman. Croc then escaped.

When an attempt at a cure fails, Killer Croc devours the involved doctor and retreats to the sewers, vowing vengeance on Batman and Black Mask.

In Infinite Crisis, Croc becomes a member of Alexander Luthor Jr.'s Secret Society of Super Villains.

One Year Later during the "Face the Face" storyline, Killer Croc is shown to have been feeding on the corpse of Orca. He next shows up in Countdown where he breaks free from his shackles in Arkham Asylum and attempts to kill Jimmy Olsen, who uses elastic powers to escape. Killer Croc is then subdued.

He is later seen among the exiled supervillains in "Salvation Run." After the Martian Manhunter is defeated and imprisoned in a fiery cage, Croc suggests that he will eat the Martian. Lex Luthor forbids it.

During the "Final Crisis" storyline, Killer Croc appears as a member of Libra's Secret Society of Super Villains. Killer Croc is later turned into a Justifier.

During the events of Brightest Day, Killer Croc is intentionally released from his cell by a guard whom Osiris kills when Deathstroke and his band of Titans infiltrate Arkham. While attempting to flee from the facility, he is attacked by Osiris who mistakes Killer Croc for his old enemy Sobek.

=== The New 52 ===
In the continuity of DC's 2011 reboot The New 52, Killer Croc is established to have fought Roy Harper in Hell's Kitchen in a flashback seen in Red Hood and the Outlaws. He is then passingly referenced by Harper, having sponsored Harper's recovery from alcoholism.

While institutionalized in Arkham, Killer Croc meets Sybil Silverlock, a woman with dissociative identity disorder. He bonds with her softer personality, and she shows him a picture of her daughter, Olive. Sybil has him promise to look after Olive if he ever gets out. After the destruction of Arkham Asylum, Killer Croc escapes and travels to Gotham Academy, where he watches over Olive.

=== DC Rebirth ===
Killer Croc gradually takes on an anti-heroic role as a member of the Suicide Squad, developing a relationship with June Moone/Enchantress. Moved by his actions, Moone reigns in the Enchantress and thanks him for helping her. Two days later in the cell, Killer Croc breaks down in tears over Moone's apparent death, as she is the only one who did not see him as monstrous. He eventually leaves the Squad.

=== Dawn of DC ===
Croc, along with Man-Bat, Orca, and the Terrible Trio kidnap a doctor at Gotham Zoo, and encounter Batman and Robin. He decides to quit and check on Poison Ivy, whom Croc helps escape from a collapsing abandoned building. Later, helping Ivy look for a cure, she works with Croc since he is immune to the Lamia mushroom. Although he wants to help with his blood, he starts to freak out at the sight of the needle because he has been scared of needles since he was a child; doctors could not penetrate his armored skin, and the experience was traumatic for him. When a zombie-like creature is found attacking Ivy, Croc goes to her defense. Solomon Grundy arrives and grabs Ivy by the neck, but Croc rescues her. They end up fighting until Ivy stops them, realizing they have an even bigger problem to deal with.

=== All In ===
In the storyline "Bad Seeds", Batman finds himself in a tense situation while trying to save two people from a mutated plant monster. Ultimately, he gets caught but is rescued by Killer Croc. After saving Batman, Croc reveals a savage plan involving a poison he has developed to eliminate Poison Ivy. He explains that the only way to stop the chaos Ivy has caused is to track her down. Killer Croc later helps Batman battle Vandal Savage, who he ends up killing in battle.

== Characterization ==
=== Powers and abilities ===
Killer Croc was born with a condition resembling epidermolytic hyperkeratosis, a disfiguring skin disorder. However, it is actually a form of regressive atavism, meaning that he has inherited traits of ancestral species of the human race, such as reptiles. This condition has been augmented by the presence of a metagene. Consequently, he has several extraordinary physical abilities relating to his endurance, speed, and strength.

His skin is hardened to the degree that it is nearly impenetrable to ordinary forms of abrasion or penetration, including high caliber weapons fired from a distance. He also possesses an extraordinary amount of super-strength; for example, he was able to tear a bank vault door off of its hinges with minimal effort. He has demonstrated regenerative powers, allowing him to heal and restore lost limbs and teeth. He possesses superhuman reflexes and speed, especially while he is moving underwater. He can also see through his crocodile eyelids. Killer Croc also has an enhanced sense of smell. Once he has become familiar with a person's scent, he can track them from miles away. As his appearance and personality have become more bestial, his misanthropy has increased dramatically. He is jealous and hateful of "normal" people and often lashes out violently without provocation. As a result of these feelings of jealousy, Croc will often entertain himself by grabbing hold of small, pointy objects as a source of comfort.

Croc's main weakness is consistently portrayed in most adaptations, aside from The Batman series, as being his low intellect. He typically resorts to brute force to solve most problems, allowing Batman to outmaneuver him in combat by thinking his way through the problems he faces in defeating the powerful Croc. Batman regularly describes his foe as an animal rather than a man. He acts almost solely on instinct and hardly ever takes the time to plan or rationalize his actions. This is a departure from his initial portrayal, where he was shown to be a ruthless and intelligent criminal who was able to plot his ascent from henchman to The Squid to perhaps the most powerful force in Gotham organized crime before being defeated by Batman.

=== Appearance ===
In later appearances, Killer Croc has been portrayed as being much more reptilian than in past incarnations. An action figure made by Kenner in 1998 featured a tail and dinosaur-like feet. When Mattel obtained the license to make DC products in the early 2000s, they released their own version of Killer Croc, sculpted by Four Horsemen Studios. This version also featured a tail and dinosaur feet. In late 2005, a re-release of this figure was modified so that the tail, along with his shirt, was removed. This version also sports a more human-like head.

The 2002-2003 Batman storyline Hush featured a more bestial Croc who was mutated against his will to appear more reptilian. This version of the character was drawn by artist Jim Lee. In The New 52, he is shown to have a crocodile-like head, though how this came to be has not yet been revealed. Such a design had previously appeared in Red Hood and the Outlaws, drawn by Kenneth Rocafort.

== Other versions ==
Various alternate universe versions of Killer Croc have appeared throughout the character's publication history:

=== Absolute Batman ===
In Absolute Batman, Waylon Jones is a human gym owner and childhood best friend of Bruce Wayne who was mutated into a reptilian monster after being experimented on at Ark M. After seeking out Wonder Woman's help for a cure, Bruce obtains a magic talisman capable of reversing Jones' transformation. This restores him to his human form, though his eyes remain reptilian.

=== Batman: Crimson Mist ===
In Batman: Crimson Mist, Killer Croc is a serial killer and member of Two-Face's gang.

=== Batman: Earth One ===
In Batman: Earth One, Killer Croc is an ally of Batman and member of the Outsiders who was previously sold to Haly's Circus as a child.

=== Batman: Reptilian ===
In Batman: Reptilian, Killer Croc was mutated after his mother was exposed to an alien mutagen while pregnant with him.

=== Batman: The Audio Adventures ===
In Batman: The Audio Adventures podcast, Killer Croc was mutated by Hugo Strange, from whom he sought a cure for his skin condition.

=== Batman: The Doom That Came to Gotham ===
In Batman: The Doom That Came to Gotham, Killer Croc is Ludvig Prinn, a wizard and member of the League of Assassins who was mutated by exposure to fungus growing underneath Gotham City.

=== DC Bombshells ===
In DC Bombshells, Killer Croc is a member of the Suicide Squad who was transformed into a crocodilian monster by the Enchantress' magic.

=== Joker Graphic Novel ===
In Joker, Killer Croc is a member of the Joker's gang and sports a more humanoid appearance.

== In other media ==
=== Television ===
Killer Croc as he appears in Batman: The Animated Series (left) and later in its revival series The New Batman Adventures (right).

- An original incarnation of Killer Croc, "Killer Croc" Morgan, appears in series set in the DC Animated Universe. This version is a former sideshow attraction and pro wrestler who turned to crime.
  - Killer Croc first appears in Batman: The Animated Series, voiced by Aron Kincaid. For this series, he sports lumpy, grey skin.
  - Killer Croc returns in The New Batman Adventures, voiced by Brooks Gardner. For this series, he has been redesigned to have a more reptilian appearance with green scales and claws.
  - An android replica of Killer Croc appears in the Batman Beyond episode "Terry's Friend Dates a Robot". Writer Stan Berkowitz intended to bring back Killer Croc for the series, as reptiles have long lifespans, but the idea was dropped.
- Killer Croc appears in The Batman, voiced by Ron Perlman. This version is a crime boss who speaks with a Cajun accent and possesses greater intellect than traditional interpretations of the character, along with his more reptilian appearance. Additionally, his origins are unknown, though rumors have spread that he is a genetic experiment gone awry who then turned mercenary, someone who dealt with voodoo magic, or simply a circus freak. In issue #25 of the series' tie-in comic The Batman Strikes!, Croc is shown in flashbacks to have been both a lab experiment and a circus act.
- Killer Croc appears in Batman: The Brave and the Bold, voiced by Stephen Root.
- Killer Croc appears in Beware the Batman, voiced by Wade Williams. This version speaks with a Cajun accent, is implied to be a cannibal, and led a group of Blackgate Penitentiary prisoners while incarcerated there.
- Killer Croc makes non-speaking appearances in Teen Titans Go!.
- Killer Croc appears in Harley Quinn, voiced by Matt Oberg. This version is a member of the Legion of Doom in the first season and the Suicide Squad's "A-team" in the third, who later enters a relationship with squad-mate the Enchantress.
- An original incarnation of Killer Croc appears in the Batwoman episode "Loose Tooth", portrayed by Heidi Ben. This version is a teenager named Steven, who found one of Killer Croc's teeth and cut himself with it, which caused him to transform into a new Killer Croc.
- Killer Croc appears in Suicide Squad Isekai, voiced by Tarō Kiuchi. This version is a rogue member of the Suicide Squad.
- Waylon Jones appears in the Batman: Caped Crusader episode "Nocturne", voiced by Cedric Yarbrough. This version works for a circus.
- Killer Croc appears in Bat-Fam, voiced again by Steve Blum.
- Killer Croc, simply named Croc, appears in Batwheels, voiced by Diedrich Bader. This version speaks in a Cajun accent, occasionally adding French words and phrases, and plays the harmonica.

=== Film ===
Killer Croc in the DC Extended Universe, portrayed by Adewale Akinnuoye-Agbaje.

- Killer Croc appears in the Batman: Gotham Knight segment "In Darkness Dwells". This version is a cannibalistic serial killer who is rumored to have been born with epidermolytic hyperkeratosis and abandoned in Gotham City's sewers. As an adult, he filed his teeth into sharpened points, became a circus sideshow performer, and went on a killing spree that eventually got him incarcerated at Arkham Asylum, where Jonathan Crane experimented on Croc for his fear aversion program, worsening his homicidal impulses. Croc subsequently escaped and fled into the sewers, but Crane injected him with his fear toxin, giving Croc a fear of bats and the ability to transfer the toxin to others via his bite.
- Killer Croc appears in Son of Batman, voiced by Fred Tatasciore. This version uses a genetic mutagen supplied by Kirk Langstrom to increase his abilities, granting himself extra muscle mass and a tail, though it eventually causes his body to fall apart.
- Killer Croc appears in Batman Unlimited: Animal Instincts, voiced by John DiMaggio. This version is a member of the Penguin's Animalitia.
- Killer Croc appears in Suicide Squad, portrayed by Adewale Akinnuoye-Agbaje. This version previously lived in Gotham City and fought Batman before he was imprisoned at Belle Reve. He is recruited into Task Force X and accompanies a SEAL scuba team to recover a bomb that was lost in a flooded tunnel to kill the Enchantress. Following the Enchantress' defeat, Croc is returned to prison and given a reduced sentence and improved cell conditions as a reward.
- Killer Croc appears in Batman Unlimited: Mechs vs. Mutants, voiced again by John DiMaggio.
- Killer Croc appears in The Lego Batman Movie, voiced by an uncredited Matt Villa.
- Killer Croc appears in Lego DC Comics Super Heroes: The Flash, voiced by Nolan North.
- Killer Croc appears in Lego DC Batman: Family Matters, voiced again by Nolan North.
- Killer Croc appears in Injustice, voiced by Edwin Hodge.
- Killer Croc appears in Justice League x RWBY: Super Heroes & Huntsmen, voiced by Maxwell Jacob Friedman.
- The Batman: The Doom That Came to Gotham incarnation of Killer Croc appears in the book's film adaptation.
- Killer Croc makes a non-speaking appearance in Justice League: Crisis on Infinite Earths.

=== Video games ===
==== Lego Batman ====
- Killer Croc appears as a boss and playable character in Lego Batman: The Videogame, voiced by Steve Blum. This version works for the Penguin and possesses immunity to toxins and superstrength.
- Killer Croc appears as an optional boss and unlockable playable character in Lego Batman 2: DC Super Heroes, voiced by Fred Tatasciore.
- Killer Croc appears as a boss and playable character in Lego Batman 3: Beyond Gotham, voiced again by Fred Tatasciore. This version has a Cajun accent and, unlike the previous Lego iterations of the character, uses a "bigfig" model.
- Killer Croc appears as a playable character in Lego DC Super-Villains, voiced again by Fred Tatasciore.
- Killer Croc appears in Lego Batman: Legacy of the Dark Knight. He first appears in his human form as Waylon Jones, a circus performer suffering from a skin condition, before exposure to toxic chemicals leads to his mutation into a large humanoid crocodile. Mistaken for a criminal by the police, Jones enlists Batman's help to stage a fight and allow him to leave Gotham City.

==== Batman: Arkham ====
Killer Croc appears in the Batman: Arkham series.

- Croc first appears in Batman: Arkham Asylum, voiced by Steve Blum. This version is a cannibalistic serial killer and gangster who has been charged with racketeering and smuggling illegal drugs and holds a grudge against Aaron Cash after eating his left hand amidst a failed escape attempt. At one point in the game, Batman goes into his lair to collect anti-venom spores, resulting in a very memorable boss battle.
- Croc makes a cameo appearance in Batman: Arkham City, voiced again by Steve Blum. As of this game, he was transferred to the titular super-prison and has taken refuge in its maze-like sewer network.
- A young Croc appears as the first boss of Batman: Arkham Origins, voiced by Khary Payton. After being hired by the Joker posing as Black Mask to kill Batman, Croc helps the Joker kidnap and kill Commissioner Gillian B. Loeb before fighting Batman, who defeats him.
- Croc appears as a boss in the Batman: Arkham Knight "Season of Infamy" DLC, voiced again by Steve Blum. After being captured by Warden Ranken of Iron Heights Penitentiary, Croc is experimented on for his regenerative capabilities, and the trauma of the tortures inflicted on him causes him to mutate further. Eventually, Croc mounts a breakout attempt and joins forces with the other inmates to seek revenge on Ranken, only to be defeated by Batman and Nightwing and transferred to the Gotham City Police Department (GCPD)'s custody.
- Croc appears as a playable character in Batman: Arkham Underworld, voiced again by Khary Payton.
- Croc makes a cameo appearance in Batman: Arkham VR, voiced again by Steve Blum.
- Croc appears in Batman: Arkham Shadow, voiced again by Khary Payton.

==== Other games ====
- Killer Croc appears in Batman: Dark Tomorrow, voiced by Richardo Ferrone.
- Killer Croc appears in DC Universe Online, voiced by Edwin Neal.
- Killer Croc makes a non-speaking appearance in Injustice: Gods Among Us via the Arkham Asylum stage. Additionally, he appears as a playable character in the mobile version, in which he is voiced again by Steve Blum.
- Killer Croc appears as a character summon in Scribblenauts Unmasked: A DC Comics Adventure.
- Killer Croc makes non-speaking appearances in Injustice 2 via the Batcave stage and Bane's ending.
- Killer Croc appears as an alternate skin for Baraka in Mortal Kombat 11 via the "DC Elseworld" DLC pack.

=== Miscellaneous ===
- Killer Croc appears in the novel Batman: Knightfall and Beyond. This version is said to have suffered from aggressive skin cancer that turned the outer layers of his flesh into a hardened covering when he was younger.
- Killer Croc appears in the Injustice: Gods Among Us and Injustice 2 prequel comics. In the latter, he becomes a member of Ra's al Ghul's Suicide Squad who goes on to marry squad-mate Orca, who becomes pregnant with his child, and leaves the squad with her to raise them.
- Killer Croc appears in Batman '66 #28. This version is a former henchman of King Tut whose reptilian form and strength are derived from an elixir. With help from his girlfriend Eva, Croc goes on a crime spree in the hopes of becoming Gotham's biggest crime lord until he is defeated by Batman and Robin and handed over to the police.
- Killer Croc appears in DC Super Hero Girls, voiced by Fred Tatasciore.

== See also ==
- List of Batman family enemies
