= Alastair Duncan (Scottish actor) =

Scottish actor and real estate broker

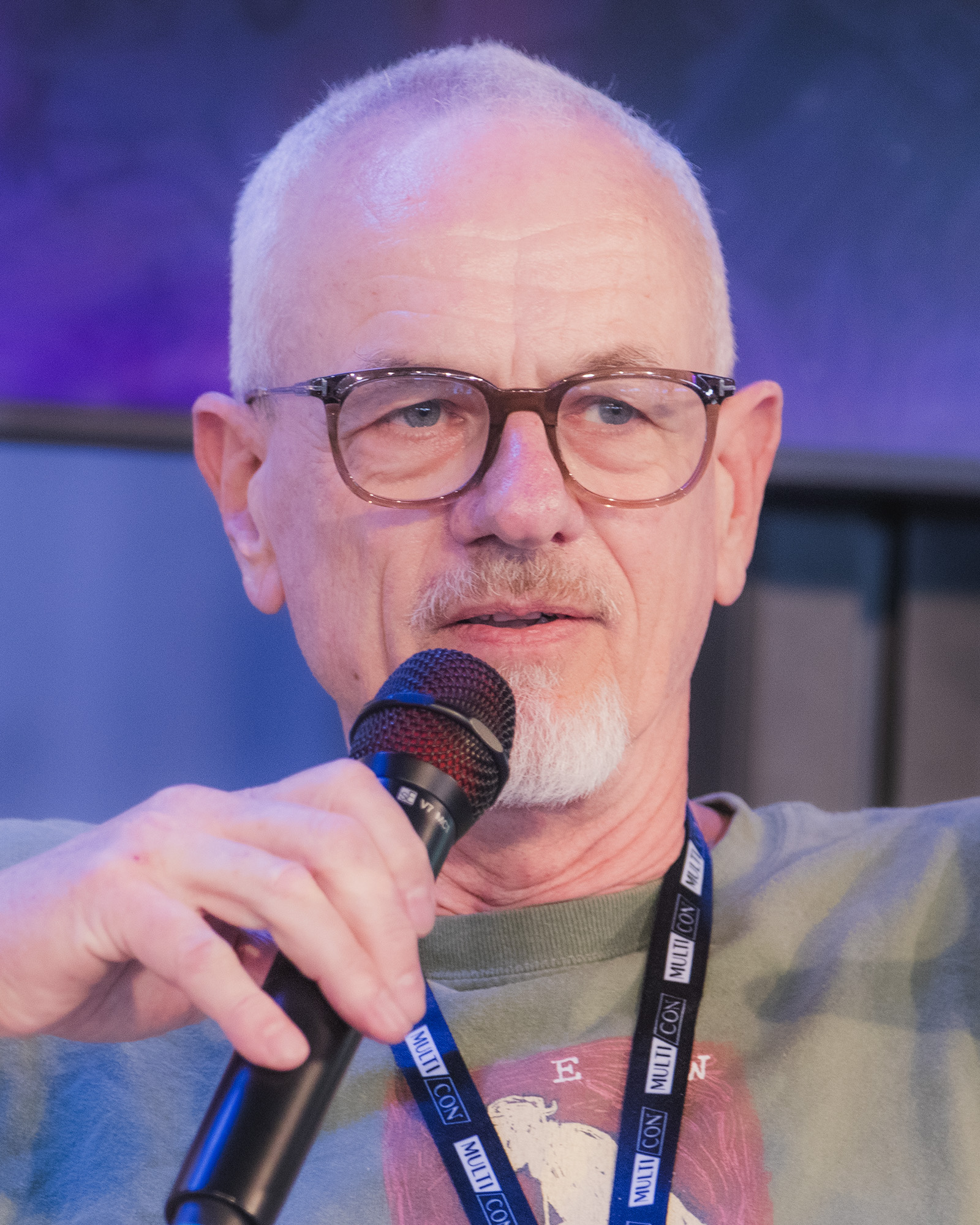
- Duncan in 2026
- Born: February 7, 1958 (age 68); Edinburgh, Scotland
- Other name: Neil Duncan
- Occupations: Actor, real estate broker
- Spouse: Anna Gunn (m. 1990; div. 2009)
- Children: 2

Alastair Duncan (born February 7, 1958) is a Scottish actor and real estate broker. Born in Edinburgh, Scotland, he has a long career in television and film. He was part of the Scottish television detective series Taggart. His first film role was Split Second (1992). He has since appeared playing small roles in many television series such as Agatha Christie's Poirot, Hercules: The Legendary Journeys, Murder, She Wrote, Babylon 5, Buffy the Vampire Slayer, and Angel. He has also done voice acting in many television, film and video games roles as well.

== Early life ==
Duncan was born in Edinburgh, Scotland. His father is named Archibald Alexander Macbeth Duncan. Following his family's naming tradition, his name would have been Alastair David Macbeth Duncan, but his father decided to simply give him the legal name Alastair Duncan.

== Career ==
Duncan's breakout role (then credited as "Neil Duncan") was as Peter Livingstone, side-kick to Mark McManus's Taggart in Scottish television's eponymous detective series.

Leaving the show after the first two series, Duncan then appeared in the 1988 television adaptation of The Hound of the Baskervilles, starring Jeremy Brett as Sherlock Holmes.

Duncan's next key role was in the 1992 science fiction film Split Second. He continued with guest roles on television series, such as Babylon 5, All-American Girl, and The Marshal. He also appeared in television films, such as Trick of the Eye and Tower of Terror.

Since the early 2000s, he has been doing voiceover work, including films such as Batman Unlimited: Animal Instincts and video games such as Warlords Battlecry, Legacy of Kain: Defiance, X-Men Legends II: Rise of Apocalypse, Tomb Raider: Legend, Tomb Raider: Anniversary, Final Fantasy XIV, Mass Effect, Infinity Blade II, Infinity Blade III, Metal Gear Rising: Revengeance and Middle-earth: Shadow of Mordor, as well as animated television series: Alfred Pennyworth in The Batman and Adrian Toomes in Marvel's Spider-Man.

His most notable television guest appearances include episodes of Tracey Takes On..., Buffy the Vampire Slayer, Charmed, Angel and Leverage.

Duncan was one of 400 actors considered for the lead role in the international hit series Highlander: The Series but lost out to Adrian Paul. He later guest-starred in the fifth season's episode "Dramatic License" as immortal Terence Coventry.

In 2011, Duncan appeared in David Fincher's The Girl with the Dragon Tattoo. Duncan has also provided his voice for How to Train Your Dragon 2 and acted in the HBO series Westworld.

He has also done voice acting as well, appearing in several video games. He portrayed the voice of the character Senator Armstrong in Metal Gear Rising: Revengeance, and voiced Celebrimbor in Middle-earth: Shadow of Mordor and its sequel Middle-earth: Shadow of War. He has also voiced and performed motion capture for the Norse god Mimir in 2018's God of War, its sequel God of War Ragnarök and for the role of "President" in Death Stranding 2: On The Beach.

== Personal life ==
In 1994, after beginning to find regular work as an actor, Duncan relocated from the United Kingdom to Los Angeles. According to one interview, he happened to move two weeks before the Northridge earthquake.

Duncan was married to actress Anna Gunn, but the couple divorced in 2009. Together they have two daughters.

== Theatre ==
Year	Title	Role	Company	Director	Notes
1986	The Wallace	William Wallace	Brunton Theatre, Musselburgh	Charles Nowosielski	play by Sydney Goodsir Smith

== Filmography ==
=== Film ===
Year	Title	Role	Notes
1992	Split Second	Det. Dick Durkin	Credited as Neil Duncan
1992	Absent Without Leave	Awkward Squad	Credited as Neil Duncan
1994	Sleeping with Strangers	Daniel	Credited as Neil Duncan
2005	The Batman vs. Dracula	Alfred Pennyworth	Voice, direct-to-video
2011	The Girl with the Dragon Tattoo	Greger	
2015	Batman Unlimited: Animal Instincts	Alfred Pennyworth	Voice, direct-to-video
2015	Batman Unlimited: Monster Mayhem	Alfred Pennyworth	Voice, direct-to-video
2015	Batman Unlimited: Mechs vs. Mutants	Alfred Pennyworth, Mad Hatter	Voice, direct-to-video
2021	Batman: The Long Halloween	Alfred Pennyworth	Voice, direct-to-video
2024	Justice League: Crisis on Infinite Earths - Part One	Alfred Pennyworth	Voice, direct-to-video

=== Television ===
Year	Title	Role	Notes
1985–94	Taggart	DS Peter Livingstone	16 episodes
1989	Saracen	Simon Bleasdale	Episode: "Tooth and Claw"
1989	About Face	Jamie	Episode: "Mrs. Worthington's Daughter"
1991	Agatha Christie's Poirot	Captain Black	Episode: "The Tragedy at Marsdon Manor"
1991	Screen Two	Jonathon Parker	Episode: "The Laughter of God"
1992	Medics	Greg Maxwell	1 episode
1994	Chandler & Co	Paul Dailey	Episode: "Past Imperfect"
1994	Trick of the Eye	Simon	Television film
1994	Blossom	Graham	2 episodes
1994	All-American Girl	Calvin Whitaker	Episode: "Educating Margaret"
1995	The Marshal	Rainey	Episode: "Natural Law"
1995	The Home Court	Paul	Episode: "Time Flies"
1996	Murder, She Wrote	Sgt. Colin Baxter	Episode: "Southern Double-Cross"
1996	Dead Man's Walk	Capt. Billy Falconer	Television film
1996	Hercules: The Legendary Journeys	Sordis	Episode: "Mercenary"
1996	Highlander: The Series	Terence Coventry	Episode: "Dramatic License"
1996–99	Tracey Takes On...	Euan McCloud, Capt. Philip "Pip" St. Aubyn	14 episodes
1997	Xena: Warrior Princess	Perion	Episode: "Been There, Done That"
1997	Babylon 5	Latimere	Episode: "The Deconstruction of Falling Stars"
1997	Tower of Terror	Gilbert London	Television film
1998	Buddy Faro	Eric / Jeffrey Mendelbaum	Episode: "Now You See Him, Now He's Dead"
1999	Seven Days	Russian Captain	Episode: "Last Breath"
1999	Norm	Paul	Episode: "While You Weren't Sleeping"
1999	Thanks	Edward Randolph	Episode: "Tobacco"
1999	Sabrina the Teenage Witch	Pierre Curie	Episode: "Aging, Not So Gracefully"
2000	Diagnosis: Murder	Eliot Grayson	Episode: "Too Many Cooks"
2000	Buffy the Vampire Slayer	Collins	2 episodes
2000	The Three Stooges	Theatre Manager	Television film
2000	Angel	Collins	Episode: "Sanctuary"
2001	Providence	Graham Hollings	4 episodes
2001	ER	Talk Show Host	Uncredited, Episode: "Four Corners"
2001	Charmed	Alaster	Episode: "Brain Drain"
2002	Maybe It's Me	James	Episode: "The Fever Episode"
2003	The Lyon's Den	Haley's Father	Episode: "Beach House"
2003	Miss Match	Ian	Episode: "Bad Judgement"
2004	The Grim Adventures of Billy & Mandy	Odin	Voice, episode: "A Kick in the Asgard"
2004–08	The Batman	Alfred Pennyworth	Voice, 50 episodes
2007	Mad Men	George Pelham	Episode: "Marriage of Figaro"
2010	The Mentalist	Francis Slocombe	Episode: "The Red Box"
2010	Leverage	President Edwin Ribera	Episode: "The San Lorenzo Job"
2011	Castle	Reginald Easley	Episode: "Lucky Stiff"
2013	Bones	Heinrich Gloeckner	Episode: "The Secrets in the Proposal"
2013	CSI: Crime Scene Investigation	Graham Deveraux	Episode: "Last Supper"
2013	Regular Show	Mordecai's Dad, Pilgrim	Voice, episode: "The Thanksgiving Special"
2014	NCIS	Peter Velo	Episode: "So It Goes"
2015	The Grinder	Lord Chief Justice Pugue	Episode: "Buckingham Malice"
2016	Westworld	Cottage Father	Episode: "The Adversary"
2017–18	Dragons: Race to the Edge	Additional Voices	13 episodes
2017–19	Spider-Man	Adrian Toomes / Vulture, Goblin King, additional voices	Voice, 10 episodes
2018	Trollhunters: Tales of Arcadia	Additional Voices	2 episodes
2019	Avengers Assemble	Adrian Toomes / Vulture	Voice, episode: "Vibranium Curtain"
2020	Stillwater	Goose	Voice, episode: "The Haircut/Paper Wings"
2023	Castlevania: Nocturne	Vaublanc	Voice, 2 episodes
TBA	God of War †	Mímir	

=== Video games ===
Year	Title	Role	Notes
2003	Star Wars Jedi Knight: Jedi Academy	Reborn #1, Cultist #2, Imperial Officer #1	
2003	The Hobbit	Kili	
2003	Legacy of Kain: Defiance	Mortanius, Hylden Lord	
2004	Syphon Filter: The Omega Strain	Mihai Niculescu	
2005	Killer7	Curtis Blackburn	
2005	Tom Clancy's Rainbow Six: Lockdown	Additional Voices	
2005	X-Men Legends II: Rise of Apocalypse	Bastion	
2006	Onimusha: Dawn of Dreams	Mitsunari Ishida	
2006	Tomb Raider: Legend	Kent	
2007	Pirates of the Caribbean: At World's End	Penrod	
2007	Tomb Raider: Anniversary	Qualopec	
2007	Mass Effect	Nihlus Kryik, Councilor Sparatus, ERCS Guard	
2010	Mass Effect 2	Councilor Sparatus, Anto Korragan, Captain Narom, Kylan, Blue Suns Enemies	
2010	Final Fantasy XIV	Additional Voices	
2010	God of War: Ghost of Sparta	Soldier #8, Citizen Male #7	
2011	Professor Layton and the Miracle Mask	Additional Voices	Credited as Archibald Macbeth
2011	Ace Combat: Assault Horizon	Lion 2	
2011	Uncharted 3: Drake's Deception	Marlowe's Agents	
2011	The Elder Scrolls V: Skyrim	Captain Veleth	Dragonborn DLC
2011	Infinity Blade II	Raidriar	
2012	Kingdoms of Amalur: Reckoning	Additional Voices	
2012	Mass Effect 3	Councilor Sparatus, Turian Pilot	
2012	Starhawk	Rifters, Outcast	
2013	Metal Gear Rising: Revengeance	Senator Steven Armstrong	
2013	Professor Layton and the Azran Legacy	Additional Voices	Credited as Archibald Macbeth
2013	Infinity Blade III	Raidriar	
2013	Ratchet & Clank: Into the Nexus	Thug #3	
2014	Lightning Returns: Final Fantasy XIII	Taleb	
2014	Middle-earth: Shadow of Mordor	Celebrimbor	
2015	The Order: 1886	Additional Voices	
2017	Middle-earth: Shadow of War	Celebrimbor	
2018	God of War	Mímir	
2018	Darksiders III	Angel Soldier, Marker Male	
2019	Star Wars: The Old Republic	Additional Voices	Onslaught DLC
2019	Call of Duty: Modern Warfare	Additional Voices	
2022	God of War Ragnarök	Mímir	
2022	Tactics Ogre: Reborn	Warren Omon, Leundar Balbatos	
2023	Justice League: Cosmic Chaos	Alfred Pennyworth, Clinton Scarantino, Old Man	
2023	Hogwarts Legacy	Isidora's Father	
2025	Death Stranding 2: On the Beach	The President	Motion capture, voice and likeness
