= Man-Bat =

DC Comics character

- The Man-Bat from Who's Who in the DC Universe #12, art by Michael Golden

Publication information
- Publisher: DC Comics
- First appearance: Detective Comics #400 (June 1970)
- Created by: Frank Robbins (writer); Neal Adams (artist); Julius Schwartz (concept)

In-story information
- Alter ego: Dr. Robert Kirkland "Kirk" Langstrom
- Species: Metahuman
- Team affiliations: Justice League; Secret Society of Super Villains; Justice League Dark; Suicide Squad
- Abilities: (As Langstrom): Genius-level intellect; Proficient biochemist and zoologist; (As the Man-Bat): Superhuman strength, durability, speed, and agility; Flight; Echolocation; Razor-sharp claws and fangs

The Man-Bat (Dr. Robert Kirkland "Kirk" Langstrom) is a fictional character appearing in American comic books published by DC Comics. Introduced in Detective Comics #400 (June 1970) as an enemy of the superhero Batman, the character belongs to the collective of adversaries that make up Batman's rogues gallery. Originally depicted as a supervillain, later stories would portray the Man-Bat as a sympathetic villain or antihero.

In the original story, Kirk Langstrom was a zoologist who experimented with bat DNA, creating an extract that could supposedly give humans the acute sonar sense of a bat. After testing it on himself, he mutated into an anthropomorphic, feral half-bat hybrid, lacking sapience and acting purely on instinct. Batman managed to reverse the transformation, but Langstrom would return as the Man-Bat time and time again, albeit not necessarily as a villain, as Langstrom would sometimes retain enough sanity to use his powers for good. Several other characters have since appeared as similar Man-Bat creatures, including Langstrom's wife Francine, his father Abraham Langstrom, Francine's father Robert March, and some League of Assassins operatives that make up the Man-Bat Commandos.

Since his debut at the end of the Silver Age of Comic Books, the Man-Bat has been featured in various media adaptations, including television series and video games. In 2017, the Man-Bat was ranked as IGN's 16th-best Batman villain.

== Publication history ==
The character made his first appearance in Detective Comics #400 (June 1970) and was created by Frank Robbins and Neal Adams in collaboration with editor Julius Schwartz. The Man-Bat was the star of his own eponymous series in 1975–1976, which proved to be unpopular and was cancelled after only two issues.

== Fictional character biography ==
Batman fighting the Man-Bat in the textless cover of Man-Bat (vol. 3) #3 (August 2006), art by Mike Huddleston

Dr. Kirk Langstrom, a zoologist who specializes in chiropterology, develops an extract intended to give humans a bat's acute sonar sense and tests the formula on himself. The extract works, but transforms him into a monstrous human-bat hybrid creature. This side effect makes him so distraught that it temporarily affects his sanity. He goes on a mad rampage until Batman finds a way to reverse the effects. Later, Langstrom takes the concoction again and the Man-Bat returns. He also coaxes his wife, Francine Langstrom, into drinking the serum and she goes through the same transformation, becoming the She-Bat. Together, they terrorize Gotham City until Batman once again restores them to normal.

On some occasions, Langstrom takes the serum and retains enough sanity to work for the forces of good. During one of these periods, he works with the detective Jason Bard. On another occasion, in Action Comics #600, Jimmy Olsen inadvertently puts Superman into a cave occupied by the Man-Bat to protect him from kryptonite radiation. The Man-Bat calms the maddened Superman and then summons Hawkman, who helps Superman overcome the radiation. Kirk and Francine have a daughter, Rebecca ("Becky"), and a son, Aaron. Because of the effects the serum has on Aaron's DNA, he is born with a deadly illness. Francine turns him into a young Man-Bat to save his life.

=== Infinite Crisis and beyond ===
Francine Langstrom as she appears in Batman and the Outsiders (vol. 2) #9 (September 2008), art by Julian López

Man-Bat appears in the Infinite Crisis storyline as a member of Alexander Luthor Jr.'s Secret Society of Super Villains.

In the aftermath of that storyline, both Kirk and Francine are shown to be alive in the 2006 "One Year Later" storyline. Talia al Ghul binds and gags Francine, then threatens to poison her if Kirk does not give her the Man-Bat serum. After Langstrom gives her the formula, she releases Francine as promised. Talia utilizes the Man-Bat to turn some generic members of the League of Assassins into Man-Bat Commandos.

In Gotham Underground, Man-Bat is apprehended by the Suicide Squad. He is one of the villains seen in Salvation Run. Francine appears in Batman and the Outsiders, serving as the team's technical advisor, and her assistant Salah Miandad operates a "blank" OMAC drone known as ReMAC. In issue #10 of the series, Kirk appears, seemingly healthy and also aiding Francine.

In the 2008 miniseries Final Crisis, the Man-Bat is turned into a Justifier and is shown attacking Switzerland's Checkmate Headquarters. During the 2009 "Battle for the Cowl" storyline, following Batman's apparent death, Kirk is haunted by nightmares of becoming the Man-Bat and killing his wife. When Francine disappears, he takes the serum and tries to follow her. After an altercation with the Outsiders, he returns to his human form and is captured by Doctor Phosphorus, who reveals that the serum is not necessary to trigger the change. Kirk discovers that Phosphorus has also captured Francine, and becomes the Man-Bat to save her.

During the 2009–2010 Blackest Night storyline, Francine tracks down Kirk (as Man-Bat), having created a cure, and reveals that Kirk's next transformation will be permanent if he does not drink it. Kirk attempts to take the cure, but his Man-Bat persona will not let him. Just as Kirk is about to drink the cure, Francine is wounded in the crossfire of the battle between Black Lantern Solomon Grundy and Bizarro (the latter of whom is already at the scene, trying to prevent Kirk from taking the cure). Distraught at Francine's injuries, Kirk transforms into the Man-Bat, seemingly permanently.

=== The New 52 ===
The Man-Bat in Batman: The Dark Knight (vol. 2) #28 (April 2014), art by Ethan Van Sciver

In The New 52 (a 2011 reboot of the DC Comics universe), the majority of Kirk Langstrom's history is rebooted. The Man-Bat serum first appears in Detective Comics (vol. 2) #18 (May 2013). Ignatius Ogilvy also comes into possession of the Man-Bat serum, which he uses as an airborne virus to spread throughout Gotham City's "900 Block".

In Detective Comics (vol. 2) #19 (June 2013), Kirk Langstrom and his wife Francine are escorted by Batwoman to Batman's location. Langstrom reveals that he is the creator of the serum, which he intended to use to help deaf people. Taking responsibility for the serum's creation, he injects himself with a sample obtained by Batman. This creates an anti-virus which also spreads through the air. Langstrom is turned into a Man-Bat (the last remaining Man-Bat) as his anti-virus cures the remaining citizens of Gotham. It was later revealed that Emperor Penguin had released the virus. Emperor Penguin later made use of Langstrom's Man-Bat serum, combining it with the Venom drug and one of Poison Ivy's plant concoctions to empower himself.

Langstrom re-appears in Batman Inc. (vol. 2) #10 (June 2013), seemingly giving Batman the serum. He claims to be working on an aerosol antidote to the serum as well. The back-up feature of Detective Comics (vol. 2) #21 (August 2013) focuses on Langstrom and his wife. He changes from the Man-Bat form into his human form and becomes addicted to the Man-Bat serum, taking it every night. He apparently does not remember his actions from the previous night, yet worries that a string of reported killings are his fault.

During the "Forever Evil" storyline, the Man-Bat is among the villains recruited by the Crime Syndicate of America to join the Secret Society of Super-Villains. Scarecrow and the Man-Bat attempt to steal the frozen Talons (assassins that are associated with the Court of Owls) from Blackgate while the Penguin is having a meeting with Bane. Bane arrives at Blackgate as the Man-Bat and his fellow Man-Bats are attempting to transport the Talons to Mr. Freeze, and is able to keep one from leaving. The final issues of the series Batman: The Dark Knight would establish that Kirk is the son of a corrupt and wealthy pharmaceutical businessman named Abraham Langstrom, who regards his son as a failure when compared to Bruce Wayne, the son of his business rival Thomas Wayne. Abraham would steal his son's serum, make some of his own improvements, and use it to target the homeless (because no one would miss them) before being stopped by Batman, though he is able to plead temporary insanity to avoid going to prison.

=== DC Rebirth ===
In Harley Quinn Rebirth, Langstrom's wife goes on a rampage against Harley Quinn and her friends, turning Harley and her friend Tony into Man-Bats as part of the Penguin's plan to break Harley's spirit. Their other friends get Langstrom released, and he helps them find the antidote before escaping himself.

The Man-Bat later becomes a founding member of the second incarnation of Justice League Dark.

== Powers and abilities ==
As Kirk Langstrom, he is a highly intelligent scientist in the fields of biochemistry and zoology (particularly chiropterology).

By taking his bat gland extract that became known as the Man-Bat serum, Langstrom transforms into a mutant bat-like creature. When taking an antidote or if the serum wears off, he reverts to his human form. As the Man-Bat, his strength, resilience, speed, and agility are all augmented to superhuman levels. He possesses an extra set of digits in his leathery wings that allows him to fly. With his sonar radar, he can emit high-pitch sound waves and hear those echoes when they bounce off of nearby objects, thus enabling him to navigate perfectly in the darkness. If he stays in the Man-Bat form for long periods of time, he loses control over his bestial side that works purely on instinct, making him prone to harming anyone in his path.

== Other characters named Man-Bat ==
=== Man-Bat Commandos ===
As mentioned above, Talia al Ghul captured Kirk Langstrom and threatened to poison Francine if he did not give her the Man-Bat serum. Kirk gives in to Talia's demands, and she uses the Man-Bat serum on several members of the League of Assassins to turn them into Man-Bats.

In 2011, The New 52 rebooted the DC Universe. Various Man-Bats appear under the control of Talia al Ghul in her plot to destroy Batman. It is later explained that Talia had an agent steal the Man-Bat serum from Langstrom's laboratory to use on her soldiers to create the Man-Bat Commandos.

=== Abraham Langstrom ===
Prior to the death of Thomas and Martha Wayne, Kirk's father Abraham Langstrom ran the company Patriarch Biopharmaceuticals, competing with Wayne Enterprises. Years after the Waynes' death, Abraham continued his shady deals, which involved exploiting his son's Man-Bat serum that he planned to profit from. He soon became addicted to the upgraded serum. When he became a Man-Bat, Abraham targeted the homeless people of Gotham City, draining them of their blood. This caused Batman to team up with Kirk Langstrom to fight Abraham. Because the skin of Abraham's Man-Bat form was tough, Batman injected himself with the cure and tricked Abraham into drinking his blood enough to transform back to normal. Batman then handed Abraham over to the police. After evading incarceration by claiming that he had no control over his Man-Bat form's actions, Abraham returned to his company. However, he knows that Batman may catch him if he ever makes a mistake.

=== Robert March ===
Based on Dr. March from Batman: The Animated Series, Robert March is the father of Francine Langstrom who assisted his estranged daughter in curing Kirk Langstrom of the Man-Bat serum. He was rendered insane upon coming in contact with the Man-Bat serum and Joker venom, transforming him into a deranged, larger version of Man-Bat. March's Man-Bat form battles Batman and the Outsiders until Metamorpho perfects the Man-Bat serum cure and uses it to cure March.

== Other versions ==
=== Gotham by Gaslight ===
An alternate universe version of the Man-Bat from Earth-19 appears in Countdown to Final Crisis: The Search for Ray Palmer.

=== Flashpoint ===
An alternate universe version of the Man-Bat appears in Flashpoint. This version is an ally of Sam Lane before being killed by Miranda Shrieve, the granddaughter of Matthew Shrieve, whose family Lane had killed.

=== JLA: The Nail ===
An alternate universe version of the Man-Bat makes a cameo appearance in JLA: The Nail as a prisoner of Cadmus Labs.

== In other media ==
=== Television ===
The Man-Bat as depicted in Batman: The Animated Series (left) and The Batman (right).
- The Kirk Langstrom incarnation of the Man-Bat appears in television series set in the DC Animated Universe (DCAU), voiced by Marc Singer, while the Man-Bat's vocal effects were provided by special sound effects.
  - First appearing in Batman: The Animated Series, this version is a zoologist at the Gotham City Zoo who developed a formula that would allow humans to "evolve" by granting them bat-like traits. The formula originated from Langstrom's father-in-law, Dr. Robert March, who helps keep his identity hidden from the authorities following his transformation. In the episode "On Leather Wings", the Man-Bat commits a series of chemical thefts until he is defeated and cured by Batman. In later episodes, Langstrom helps Batman investigate Dr. Emile Dorian, and cures his wife Francine after she becomes the "She-Bat" when she is accidentally exposed to a different Man-Bat serum created by Dr. March.
  - Kirk Langstrom makes a cameo appearance in The New Batman Adventures episode "Chemistry".
  - In the Batman Beyond episode "Splicers", a new trend dubbed "splicing" involves fusing bestial and human DNA. The new Batman ends up captured by the Splicers' leader Abel Cuvier and injected with vampire bat DNA, transforming him into a Man-Bat before Bruce Wayne cures him.
- The Kirk Langstrom incarnation of the Man-Bat appears in The Batman, voiced by Peter MacNicol, while the Man-Bat's vocal effects were provided by special sound effects. This version is an employee at Wayne Enterprises who conducted research on bats and appears to have albinism. Additionally, he can produce sticky slime from his mouth while in his Man-Bat form. In the episode "The Man Who Would Be Bat", Langstrom creates a serum in an attempt to gain a fearsome reputation akin to Batman despite Bruce Wayne cutting off his funding. Following several confrontations with Batman, Langstrom is defeated and taken to Arkham Asylum. In the episode "Pets", Langstrom turns back into the Man-Bat due to remnants of the serum in his body, and reluctantly serves the Penguin until he is cured by Batman and returned to Arkham. As of the episode "Attack of the Terrible Trio", Langstrom has renounced his Man-Bat identity and helps Batman develop an antidote for a mutagen that the Terrible Trio developed using his research.
- The Kirk Langstrom incarnation of the Man-Bat appears in Beware the Batman, voiced by Robin Atkin Downes. This version was forcibly mutated and mind-controlled by Professor Pyg and Mister Toad, but is later freed by Batman and Katana and becomes a founding member of the Outsiders.
- The Man-Bat makes a cameo appearance in the Gotham episode "No Man's Land", portrayed by an uncredited actor. He was originally going to make further appearances in the fifth season, but this never came to pass due to the season being shortened and the series being cancelled.
- The Man-Bat appears in the Scooby-Doo and Guess Who? episode "What a Night for a Dark Knight!". After the Man-Bat kidnaps Alfred Pennyworth, Batman and Mystery Inc. join forces to save him. At first, the former suspects Kirk Langstrom, but rules him out upon realizing he is incarcerated at Arkham Asylum. After rescuing Alfred, the group discovers the Joker had dressed up as the Man-Bat as part of a plot to get the password to Bruce Wayne's bank accounts.
- The Kirk Langstrom incarnation of the Man-Bat makes cameo appearances in Harley Quinn as a member of the Legion of Doom.
- The Kirk Langstrom incarnation of the Man-Bat appears in Bat-Fam, voiced by Bobby Moynihan. This version lives in Wayne Manor's belfry and retains his intelligence.

=== Film ===
- The Man-Bat was considered to appear in an unproduced script for Batman Unchained, but was dropped in favor of the Scarecrow and Harley Quinn. The Man-Bat was also meant to appear in an alternate proposal, Lee Shapiro's Batman: DarKnight script, alongside the Scarecrow and due to be played by Mark Linn-Baker or Martin Short. However, both projects never came to pass.
- An alternate universe version of the Man-Bat hybridized with Catwoman and called the She-Bat makes a cameo appearance in Justice League: Crisis on Two Earths as a member of the Crime Syndicate.
- Kirk Langstrom and the Man-Bat Commandos appear in Son of Batman, with Langstrom voiced by Xander Berkeley and the Man-Bat Commandos' vocal effects provided by Dee Bradley Baker. The League of Assassins take Langstrom's family hostage to force him to create a Man-Bat army to bolster their ranks until Batman and Damian Wayne rescue the Langstroms. While the mutagen is completed, Langstrom creates an antidote to stop the Man-Bat Commandos.
- The Kirk Langstrom incarnation of the Man-Bat appears in the Batman Unlimited series of films, voiced by Phil LaMarr.
  - He first appears in Batman Unlimited: Animal Instincts. While working on a serum to help the deaf and blind, Langstrom accidentally turns himself into the Man-Bat. The Penguin subsequently exploits him into helping create robotic beasts to bolster the Penguin's "Animilitia" in exchange for cures, until Red Robin causes Langstrom's mind to resurface in the Man-Bat's body. Langstrom then helps defeat the Penguin and defend Gotham against the Midas Meteor, burning out the Man-Bat formula and reverting to his human form in the process.
  - Langstrom returns in Batman Unlimited: Mechs vs. Mutants. As of this film, he works as a robotics expert for Bruce Wayne.
- An alternate universe version of Kirk Langstrom appears as Batman in Justice League: Gods and Monsters, voiced by Michael C. Hall. While in college, this version became a pseudo-vampire in an attempt to cure his cancer, with his best friend Will Magnus carrying out additional research to develop a separate cure. Langstrom went on to be his universe's Batman and a founding member of the Justice League.
- The Man-Bat appears in Lego DC Comics: Batman Be-Leaguered, with vocal effects provided by Dee Bradley Baker.
- The Man-Bat appears in Lego DC Comics Super Heroes: Justice League – Attack of the Legion of Doom, with vocal effects provided again by Dee Bradley Baker. This version is an aspiring member of the Legion of Doom.
- The Man-Bat makes a non-speaking cameo appearance in The Lego Batman Movie.
- The Man-Bat makes a non-speaking cameo appearance in Injustice.
- An alternate universe version of Kirk Langstrom appears in Batman: The Doom That Came to Gotham, voiced by Jeffrey Combs. This version is a professor who helped found Gotham centuries prior, gaining longevity through dark magic. In the present, Langstrom is killed by an unknown assailant.

=== Video games ===
==== Lego DC series ====
- The Man-Bat appears as a boss and unlockable playable character in Lego Batman: The Videogame, with vocal effects provided by Chris Edgerly. In the Nintendo DS version, he is unlocked through the "Villain Hunt" mini-game, while in all other versions, he can be unlocked from the Batcomputer after he is defeated in the story mode.
- The Man-Bat appears as an optional boss and unlockable playable character in Lego Batman 2: DC Super Heroes, with vocal effects provided by Fred Tatasciore.
- The Man-Bat appears as an unlockable playable character in Lego Batman 3: Beyond Gotham, with vocal effects provided by Dee Bradley Baker.
- The DCAU incarnation of the Man-Bat appears as a playable character in Lego DC Super-Villains, via the Batman: The Animated Series Level Pack.

==== Other games ====
- The Man-Bat appears in the SNES version of The Adventures of Batman & Robin.
- The Kirk Langstrom incarnation of the Man-Bat appears in Batman: Arkham Knight, voiced by Loren Lester. Following an encounter on Gotham City's Miagani Island during the story mode, a side mission sees Batman investigating the Man-Bat. After catching up to him, Batman collects a blood sample and eventually learns of Langstrom. While investigating the scientist's lab, Batman learns of Langstrom's experiments in using vampire bat DNA to cure deafness, and how his first attempt resulted in him transforming into the Man-Bat and killing his wife Francine. Batman synthesizes an antidote and administers it to Langstrom before taking him to the Gotham City Police Department (GCPD) headquarters, where he is left crying over Francine's fate. If the player returns to Langstrom's lab after this, they will find Francine's body gone and a broken television screen with the words "forever my love" written on it in a red substance. If the console or computer's date is changed to October 31 after capturing Langstrom, Batman will re-encounter the Man-Bat but will not have the option to pursue him. If Batman returns to the GCPD headquarters afterwards, he will find two police officers looking into Langstrom's empty cell, commenting that he transformed into the Man-Bat again and escaped.
- Kirk Langstrom and the Man-Bat Commandos appear in Gotham Knights. The former was a member of the Court of Owls who secretly conducted work with their enemies, the League of Shadows. After the Court discovered Langstrom's treachery and killed him for it, the League steals his research and combines it with Lazarus Pit chemicals to create an army of Man-Bats, which are defeated by the Gotham Knights.

=== Miscellaneous ===
- The Man-Bat appears in Super Friends #28.
- The DCAU incarnation of the Man-Bat appears in The Batman Adventures #21. He is forcibly transformed and recruited by Emile Dorian, who attempts to work with him to form a "House of Dorian" with Tygrus and Anthony Romulus.
  - Issue #11 features Dr. Stefen Parry stealing the Man-Bat serum from Langstrom and transforming into his own Man-Bat before he is defeated by Batman and arrested.
- The DCAU incarnations of Kirk and Francine Langstrom appear in the Batman Beyond tie-in comic. In flashbacks, the Langstroms lived peacefully, studying sonics and going on to have two children. However, Francine developed an aggressive form of Parkinson's disease and was given a short life expectancy. In response, Kirk attempted to perfect the Man-Bat serum to save her, but she died before he could do so. Following this, his children left him, angered that he did not spend time with her during her final days. Devastated, Kirk turned to his perfected serum, became the Man-Bat once more, and lived in secret. During this period of time, he rescued a girl named Tey from the Jokerz, injected her with the serum, and fell in love with her. In the present, Kirk builds a cult of Man-Bats with the intention of using Kanium to help him and his cult control themselves more effectively. Bruce Wayne tries to reason with him, but Kirk views them both as monsters and attempts to use a bomb to kill themselves. After the new Batman rescues them, Kirk tells Wayne to use his second chance wisely before killing himself with the bomb.
- The Man-Bat appears in Smallville Season 11 as an inmate of Arkham Asylum. After acquiring a yellow ring of Parallax and becoming a Yellow Lantern, the Man-Bat and other empowered inmates battle Batman and Nightwing until Superman intervenes long enough for Emil Hamilton to reboot the rings and depower the inmates. Following Parallax's defeat, the inmates are returned to Arkham.
- The Man-Bat appears in All-New Batman: The Brave and the Bold #12.
- A new incarnation of the Man-Bat appears in issue #4 of the Beware the Batman tie-in comic book. Tim Quan, an acquaintance of Barbara Gordon, sneaks into Kirk Langstrom's laboratory and ends up mutating into a Man-Bat. Having become more unstable than Langstrom, Quan goes on a rampage and kidnaps Barbara. Batman teams up with Langstrom to find and cure Quan, at the expense of Langstrom's own cure.
- The Kirk Langstrom version of Batman appears in the Justice League: Gods and Monsters Chronicles episode "Twisted", voiced again by Michael C. Hall.
- The Man-Bat appears in the Injustice: Gods Among Us prequel comic.
- The Man-Bat appears in the Injustice 2 prequel comic as a member of Ra's al Ghul's Suicide Squad until he is killed amidst Gorilla Grodd's betrayal.

== See also ==
- List of Batman family enemies
