= Injustice 2 (comics) =

American comic book series

- Cover of Injustice 2 #1 (April 2017), art by Jim Lee

Publication information
- Publisher: DC Comics
- Schedule: Weekly
- Format: Ongoing
- Genre: Superhero
- Publication date: April 2017 – October 2018
- No. of issues: 72 (digital); 36 (print); 2 Annuals (Print & Digital)

Creative team
- Written by: Tom Taylor
- Artists: Bruno Redondo; Juan Albarran; Daniel Sampere; Mike S. Miller; Xermanico

Injustice 2 is an American comic book series written by Tom Taylor and published by DC Comics. It is based on the fighting video game Injustice: Gods Among Us and its sequel, Injustice 2. Taking place between the events of the two games, the comic is set in an alternate reality where a Batman-led insurgency has defeated Superman's totalitarian regime and has to deal with the aftermath.

The series is illustrated by various artists including Bruno Redondo, Juan Albarran, Daniel Sampere and Mike S. Miller. The digital issues were published weekly from April 2017 to October 2018. Print issues were also released biweekly, and the series has been collected in trade paperback and hardcover editions.

== Plot ==
The plot follows the end of the Injustice: Gods Among Us with Superman in captivity. The primary conflict centers around Ra's al Ghul assembling a group of villains to force the world into reversing the effects of climate change. His forces include Solovar, Gorilla Grodd, the Suicide Squad, Athanasia al Ghul, Jason Todd, Damian Wayne, and Killer Croc, among others. His plans include a successful attack on the U.S. Capitol which kills the President and much of his cabinet, along with the majority of Congress, and the kidnapping of various CEOs, including Ted Kord, who are eaten by Killer Croc and Orca. Ra's also forces Professor Ivo to build Amazo, which he plans on using to kill the majority of humans on Earth. When Batman and his allies arrive to fight Amazo, they are initially unable to inflict significant damage. Supergirl and Blue Beetle manage to bring it to the Moon, where Kara destroys it with assistance from Damian, who grew majorly concerned about his grandfather's genocidal methods.

To help predict future threats, Batman creates Brother Eye, an artificial intelligence that he uses to monitor mankind. Off Earth, the Green Lanterns face the Red Lanterns, who have inducted Starro into the group. After the Red Lanterns attack Oa, the Green Lanterns ally with Sinestro, a reformed Hal Jordan, and Lobo to repel the attack. Solovar later banishes Grodd and removes his telepathic abilities, but Brainiac arrives and assists Grodd in returning to power. Upon retaking the throne of Gorilla City, Grodd takes control of Ra's al Ghul's mind and kills him. The series ends with Alfred, unable to continue taking care of Bruce, leaving Wayne Manor.

== Publication history ==
The series was first announced at the 2016 San Diego Comic-Con, with original Injustice: Gods Among Us comics writer Tom Taylor returning to write the series. The first issue was released digitally on April 11, 2017, and subsequent issues were released weekly. Print issues were released biweekly, collecting two digital issues each. The first print issue was published on May 3, 2017. The series concluded in October 2018.

== Reception ==
The series has been generally well-received by critics. According to review aggregator Comic Book Roundup, Injustice 2 as a whole has an average score of 8.4/10 based on 402 critic reviews.

Early reviews were generally positive. IGN and ComicBookWire both felt the series got off to a strong, albeit slow, start, with the former praising the "terrific character moments". Comicosity's Allen Thomas gave the first issue a perfect score and said: "The art and writing work in tandem to produce a story that engages an appetite for intriguing interpersonal relationships and stellar visuals." In her review of the Wonder Woman-focused Annual #1, Jennifer DeRoss was disappointed by Taylor's characterization of Wonder Woman, stating: "This issue is literally overshadowed by Superman multiple times and is so heavily based on other popular versions of the character that it feels like they were trying to force a concept instead of developing a unique character."

== Collected editions ==
The Injustice 2 series is collected in several trade paperbacks and hardcovers.

- Volume 1: collects issues #1–6
  - Hardcover: October 25, 2017; ISBN 978-1401274412
  - Trade paperback: April 25, 2018; ISBN 978-1401278403
- Volume 2: collects issues #7–12, #14
  - Hardcover: April 25, 2018; ISBN 978-1401278410
  - Trade paperback: August 1, 2018; ISBN 978-1401281342
- Volume 3: collects issues #13, #15–17, Annual #1
  - Hardcover: April 25, 2018; ISBN 978-1401280291
- Volume 4: collects issues #18-24
  - Hardcover: December 5, 2018; ISBN 978-1401285333
- Volume 5: collects issues #25-30
  - Hardcover: April 30, 2019; ISBN 978-1401289164
- Volume 6: collects issues #31-36, Annual #2
  - Trade Paperback: December 17, 2019; ISBN 978-1401295141
- Injustice 2 Omnibus: collects issues #1-36, Annual #1 & #2
  - Hardcover: May 27, 2025; ISBN 978-1799501466
