= Batman Unlimited: Animal Instincts =

- DVD cover
- Directed by: Butch Lukic
- Screenplay by: Heath Corson
- Based on: Batman Unlimited by: Mattel
- Produced by: Butch Lukic
- Starring: Roger Craig Smith; Chris Diamantopoulos; Dana Snyder
- Edited by: Bruce A. King
- Music by: Kevin Riepl
- Production companies: Warner Bros. Animation; DC Entertainment
- Distributed by: Warner Home Video
- Release date: May 12, 2015
- Running time: 77 minutes
- Country: United States
- Language: English

Batman Unlimited: Animal Instincts is an American animated superhero film and the first entry in the Batman Unlimited series. It was released on May 12, 2015 on Blu-ray, DVD and Digital HD.

== Plot ==
Gotham City is under attack from a group of animal-related villains who use animal robots to assist them in their crimes. The group, which calls itself the "Animalitia", consists of the Penguin, Cheetah, Man-Bat, Killer Croc, and their leader, a gorilla named Silverback. After foiling various crimes attempted by the group, Batman discovers that all the animal crimes form a perfect circle around Gotham City's newest and tallest building, the Aviary, built by the Penguin.

That night, Bruce attends a function at the Aviary, where Oswald Cobblepot starts a lecture on "Bumbershoot Mechanics", the company who makes the robots. He introduces the robots' designer, Dr. Kirk Langstrom. Batman puts a minuscule tracking device onto Langstrom. Back at the Batcave, Batman deduces the next animal crime will take place at Gotham Zoo.

The Animalitia breaks into the zoo, where Man-Bat hears Batman, Red Robin, Nightwing, Green Arrow, and Flash come for them. The robot animals show up again and the heroes attempt to take them down. Green Arrow takes out the bat by firing a surprise arrow out of a tunnel, Nightwing uses a crane to crush the wolf with girders, and Flash tricks the tiger into skidding into a building and breaking. They take the robots to the Batcave for analysis, but they need Langstrom to hack them. They also find out that the animals left something at their last three crime scenes instead of taking something. They use the tracking device to find Langstrom at Bumbershoot Mechanics. Batman has Red Robin stay behind and analyze the robots and Flash discover what they left behind.

At Bumbershoot, the heroes are attacked by the Animalitia. While battling Man-Bat, Batman sees the tracker on him, meaning that Langstrom is Man-Bat. Batman stuns him with a sonic device and they give him a serum to revert him to human form. Langstrom reveals that Penguin assigned him to build the robots for a retrieval mission. An asteroid called the Midas Heart is passing by Earth and the villains want to make the Midas Heart fall into Gotham so they can get the gold at its center. Langstrom reverts to Man-Bat after the serum wears off, but not before giving Batman and Flash a transmitter they can use to create a force field to protect Gotham from the impact of the Midas Heart.

Batman has Red Robin upload a bug to revert the robots to the heroes' side. Penguin takes off in an escape pod, leaving the animals behind. The heroes take out the villains with the robots. Red Robin and Man-Bat show up to help revert the Midas Heart. Flash and Nightwing collect robot parts, and they use Silverback as a power source. Unable to reverse the Midas Heart, Batman has Flash move the generators outside of Gotham and Man-Bat take the robot parts above the city to make a force field to keep Gotham safe. The Midas Heart smashes into the force field with Gotham unharmed, and Man-Bat permanently returns to Langstrom. The villains are taken to prison, and the heroes go their separate ways. Penguin's pod crashes into Antarctica.

== Cast ==
- Roger Craig Smith as Batman/Bruce Wayne
- Dana Snyder as Penguin/Oswald Cobblepot
- Chris Diamantopoulos as Green Arrow/Oliver Queen
- Laura Bailey as Cheetah/Barbara Minerva, Newscaster
- John DiMaggio as Killer Croc/Waylon Jones
- Will Friedle as Nightwing/Dick Grayson
- Yuri Lowenthal as Red Robin/Tim Drake
- Phil LaMarr as Man-Bat/Kirk Langstrom
- Charlie Schlatter as Flash/Barry Allen
- Keith Szarabajka as Silverback
- Richard Epcar as Commissioner James Gordon
- Alastair Duncan as Alfred Pennyworth
- Amanda Troop as Gladys Windsmere, Pretty Girl
- Matthew Mercer as Mech Guard 1, Wealthy Jock
- Eric Bauza as Punk #1, Rookie Cop
- Mo Collins as Dispatch, Distinguished Woman
- Keith Ferguson as Gruff Cop, Distinguished Man

== Reception ==
Batman Unlimited: Animal Instincts received generally favorable reviews.

== Production ==
The film's name and character designs are taken from Mattel's toy line. As such, several releases of the video include a small "Bat-Flyer" toy that can be used with the Batman figures from the line (said toy is pictured above for the special Blu-Ray/DVD/Digital release).

Three actors from past DC media reprised their roles for this film. Roger Craig Smith reprised his role as Batman from Batman: Arkham Origins, Alastair Duncan reprised his role of Alfred Pennyworth from The Batman, and Charlie Schlatter reprised his role as The Flash from Superman: The Animated Series, The Batman, Lego Batman 2: DC Super Heroes, and Lego Batman 3: Beyond Gotham.

== Sequel ==
The film was followed by a sequel, Batman Unlimited: Monster Mayhem, which was released on August 18, 2015, and 22 short cartoons. A mobile application was released as well.
