= Batman Unlimited =

Action figure line produced by Mattel

- Type: Action figures
- Invented by: DC Comics
- Company: Mattel
- Country: USA
- Availability: 2013–16
- Materials: Plastic

Batman Unlimited is an action figure line produced by Mattel based on Batman. It inspired a series of three direct-to-video animated films and one web series.

== Toys ==
The original toy line debuted in 2013, followed by a relaunch in 2015, which included supporting films.

== Films ==
- Batman Unlimited: Animal Instincts (May 2015) – Gotham is plagued by crime committed by an animal-themed villain squad, The "Animalitia" composed of Penguin, Silverback, Cheetah, Killer Croc, and Man-Bat. Alas, Batman, Red Robin, Nightwing, Green Arrow, and the Flash must band together to stop them.
- Batman Unlimited: Monster Mayhem (August 2015) – It's Halloween night in Gotham City and Scarecrow, Clayface, Silver Banshee and Solomon Grundy have hit the streets to stir up trouble. Batman is on the trail of the city's spookiest villains while, further complicating matters, the clown prince of crime himself, the Joker, is ruling over this mysterious crew of misfit criminals. It's up to the Dark Knight to stop this gruesome gang before they unleash "digital laughter", a computer virus that's part of a diabolical plan to jeopardize all of Gotham City's vital technology. Batman, Green Arrow, Cyborg, Nightwing and Red Robin join the forces to battle the villains and save the city.
- Batman Unlimited: Mechs vs. Mutants (September 2016) – When evil scientist Mr. Freeze activates his latest invention on two of Gotham City's most formidable criminals—Killer Croc and Bane—things go from bad to worse. Turning them into super-sized mutant monsters, the super-villains start bashing through the streets of Gotham City with no end in sight. It's up to the Caped Crusader and his Super Hero team to save the day by putting the giant robot mechs in their place—but it will be an uphill battle as they face off against enormous foes.

== Web series ==
A web series began airing on DC Kids' YouTube channel on May 4, 2015. As of 2023, it was also available on Kabillion and Tubi.

=== Episodes ===
==== Season one ====
No.	Title	Original release date
1	"Training Standoff"	May 4, 2015
Batman and Green Arrow in a competition against each other.
2	"Batman Takes On Solomon Grundy"	May 4, 2015
Batman meets and fights a rampaging Solomon Grundy.
3	"Red Robin and Nightwing Take Down Killer Croc"	May 4, 2015
Red Robin and Nightwing fight Killer Croc. Batman, in yellow armor, joins.
4	"Batman and Red Robin Take On Man-Bat"	June 19, 2015
Batman and Red Robin on a red flying vehicle pursue Man-Bat.
5	"Batman and Nightwing Gadget-Up To Go Against Silverback"	June 19, 2015
Batman and Nightwing fight a laser beam firing Silverback.
6	"The Race is On! Batman and The Flash vs. Cheetah"	June 19, 2015
The Flash and Batman chase Cheetah.
7	"Super Hero Training Battle"	June 19, 2015
Batman competes Green Arrow again, but Green Arrow is better prepared this time.
8	"Nightwing and Red Robin vs. Silverback"	June 19, 2015
Nightwing and Red Robin defeat Silverback's henchmen.
9	"Battle in the Streets"	June 19, 2015
Batman in his Batmobile pursues The Penguin.
10	"Bank Robbery Gone Wrong"	June 22, 2015
Batman, and his robot dog Ace, chase bank robbers.
11	"Duel With The Penguin"	June 30, 2015
Robot dog Ace supports Batman in fighting The Penguin.
12	"Iced Out"	July 7, 2015
Mr. Freeze and Batman fight each other.
13	"Bank Heist"	July 14, 2015
Scarecrow prepares to rob a bank, when Joker comes around the corner to do the same.
14	"Fishing for Grundy"	July 21, 2015
A fisher accidentally catches Solomon Grundy, then faces Batman.
15	"Fight Night at the Museum"	July 28, 2015
Batman and Red Robin are fighting Scarecrow when Red Robin has to face the results of fear gas.
16	"Boardwalk Battle"	August 4, 2015
Batman and the Joker face each other in a Boardwalk with their robots.
17	"Training Exercises"	August 11, 2015
Batman is playing catch with his robot dog Ace when the robot dinosaur joins in to catch the batarangs better.
18	"Divide and Conquer"	August 18, 2015
Red Robin and Nightwing fight Clayface who soon transforms into his enemies and causes Red Robin and Nightwing to fight each other.
19	"No Joke"	August 25, 2015
Batman and Green Arrow join up to defeat The Joker.
20	"Bane Packs a Punch"	September 1, 2015
Batman tries to defeat Bane using an exosuit but is soon in trouble.
21	"Run for the Money"	September 8, 2015
Joker robs a bank and flees from Batman.
22	"Armored Truck Heist"	September 15, 2015
Batman chases Clayface with the Batmobile and tries to stop him by using ice missiles.

==== Season two ====
No.	Title	Original release date
1	"Break the Bank"	June 6, 2016
Green Arrow and Batman battle a super-sized Killer Croc in their mech suits.
2	"The Harder They Fall"	June 13, 2016
Mr. Freeze gives Bane a serum that makes him bigger and stronger, then Batman comes to stop him.
3	"Beat the Heat"	June 20, 2016
Robin (Damian) fights the lava version of Clayface. Batman joins in with his large mech suit.
4	"System Failure!"	June 27, 2016
Green Arrow and Batman, in their mechs, fight Giant-Bane.
5	"Some Assembly Required"	July 4, 2016
Batman and Robin test interchangeable parts of their vehicles, the Batmobile and the Batjet, on a course. Flash, Nightwing and Green Arrow assist.
6	"Night Games, With a Chaser"	July 11, 2016
Nightwing and Batman lure Giant Chemo and Giant Killer Croc through the streets of Gotham.
7	"The Accidental Apprentice"	July 18, 2016
Robin, left alone in a room with the Batman mech, is tired of learning and decides to board and start the large suit.
8	"Two if By Sea"	July 25, 2016
Giant Killer Croc attacks a ship when Batman comes for the rescue in his mech.
9	"Croc Rocks the Museum"	August 1, 2016
Batman, in a new black and red suit, ambushes Croc's men when they break into the Gotham museum. Croc uses his super-sizing venom to face Batman.
10	"Stone Cold Menace"	August 8, 2016
Batman and Nightwing combine parts from the BatJet with the Batmobile to have it flying to defeat Mr. Freeze.
11	"Breakout or Bust"	August 15, 2016
Giant Bane and Giant Killer Croc start dismantling Arkham Asylum when Nightwing and Batman arrive to stop them and the escaping criminals.
