= List of Superman comics =

This is a list of comic books featuring Superman and related characters, including Supergirl, Superboy, Lois Lane and his rogues gallery.

== Current publications ==
Ongoing titles and miniseries currently being published.

| Title | Vol. | No. of issues | Cover dates | Notes |
Ongoing series
| Absolute Superman | | #1– | January 2025 – | Part of the Absolute Universe. |
| Action Comics | 1 | #1–904 #0 #1,000,000 | June 1938 – October 2011 | The title was changed to Action Comics Weekly with issues #601–642. Issue #0 (October 1994) was published between issues #703 and 704 during the "Zero Hour: Crisis in Time!" crossover event and issue #1,000,000 (November 1998) was published between #748 and 749 during the "DC One Million" crossover event. |
| Action Comics | 1 | Annual #1–13 | 1987–1997; 2007–2011 | The title was changed to Action Comics Weekly with issues #601–642. Issue #0 (October 1994) was published between issues #703 and 704 during the "Zero Hour: Crisis in Time!" crossover event and issue #1,000,000 (November 1998) was published between #748 and 749 during the "DC One Million" crossover event. |
| Action Comics | 2 | #1–52 #0 #23.1–23.4 | September 2011 – July 2016 | As part of The New 52's relaunch, the title began at issue #1. Issue #0 (November 2012) was published between issues #12 and 13. Issues #23.1–23.4 were published during the "Forever Evil" crossover event. |
| Action Comics | 2 | Annual #1–3 | December 2012 – September 2014 | As part of The New 52's relaunch, the title began at issue #1. Issue #0 (November 2012) was published between issues #12 and 13. Issues #23.1–23.4 were published during the "Forever Evil" crossover event. |
| Action Comics | 1 | #957– | early August 2016 – | The title resumed its legacy numbering as part of the DC Rebirth relaunch. |
| Action Comics | 1 | Annual 2021 – | September 2021 – | The title resumed its legacy numbering as part of the DC Rebirth relaunch. |
| Batman/Superman: World's Finest | | #1– | May 2022 – | Written by Mark Waid. The series was described as taking place a few years before the present day, when Dick Grayson was still Robin and was 17–18 years old. |
| Superman | 1 | #1–423 | Summer 1939 – September 1986 | The title was re-titled to The Adventures of Superman with issue #424, continuing with the same numbering until May 2006, running concurrently with Superman (vol. 2). |
| Superman | 1 | Annual #1–12 | 1960–1964; 1983–1986 | The title was re-titled to The Adventures of Superman with issue #424, continuing with the same numbering until May 2006, running concurrently with Superman (vol. 2). |
| Superman | 2 | #1–226 #0 #1,000,000 | January 1987 – April 2006 | Issue #0 (October 1994) was published between issues #93 and 94 during the "Zero Hour: Crisis in Time!" crossover event and issue #1,000,000 (November 1998) was published between #139 and 140 during the "DC One Million" crossover event. |
| Superman | 2 | Annual #1–12 | 1987 – August 2000 | Issue #0 (October 1994) was published between issues #93 and 94 during the "Zero Hour: Crisis in Time!" crossover event and issue #1,000,000 (November 1998) was published between #139 and 140 during the "DC One Million" crossover event. |
| Superman | 2 | #650–714 | May 2006 – October 2011 | The Adventures of Superman was re-titled to Superman and continued its legacy numbering beginning at issue #650. The Annuals also continued their legacy numbering. |
| Superman | 2 | Annual #13–14 | January 2008 – October 2009 | The Adventures of Superman was re-titled to Superman and continued its legacy numbering beginning at issue #650. The Annuals also continued their legacy numbering. |
| Superman | 3 | #1–52 #0 #23.1–23.4 | November 2011 – July 2016 | As part of The New 52's relaunch, the title started at issue #1. Issue #0 (November 2012) was published between issues #12 and 13. Issues #23.1–23.4 were published during the "Forever Evil" crossover event. |
| Superman | 3 | Annual (vol. 2) #1–3 | October 2012 – February 2016 | As part of The New 52's relaunch, the title started at issue #1. Issue #0 (November 2012) was published between issues #12 and 13. Issues #23.1–23.4 were published during the "Forever Evil" crossover event. |
| Superman | 4 | #1–45 | August 2016 – June 2018 | Part of the DC Rebirth relaunch. |
| Superman | 4 | Annual (vol. 3) #1 | January 2017 | Part of the DC Rebirth relaunch. |
| Superman | 5 | #1–32 | September 2018 – August 2021 | Part of the New Justice relaunch. The title was replaced with Superman: Son of Kal-El, which followed the adventures of Jon Kent. |
| Superman | 6 | #1– | April 2023 – | Part of the Dawn of DC relaunch. |
| Superman Unlimited | | #1– | May 2025 – | Part of DC All-In initiative and launched under the Summer of Superman banner. |

== Formerly published titles ==
=== Superman titles ===
These were titles in which Superman starred:

- The Adventures of Superman was originally Superman (vol. 1). It ran titled as The Adventures of... from 1987 to 2006, issues #424 to 649, with a #0 issue (October 1994) published between issues #516 and 517 during the Zero Hour: Crisis in Time! crossover event and a #1,000,000 issue (November 1998) published between issues #562 and 563 during the "DC One Million" crossover event. Issue #650 was re-titled back to Superman, with Superman (vol. 2) being cancelled at issue #226. Nine Annuals were also published using The Adventures of Superman title from 1987 to 1997. After the re-titling, the Annuals continued their legacy numbering from Superman Annual (vol. 1) with Annual #13 in November 2007.
- Superman: The Man of Steel has a title similar to the miniseries The Man of Steel. However, The Man of Steel was printed in 1986, whereas this series was printed from 1991 to 2003, ending at issue #134. The series included a #0 issue (October 1994) published between issues #37 and 38 during the Zero Hour: Crisis in Time! crossover event and a #1,000,000 issue (November 1998) published between issues #83 and 84 during the "DC One Million" crossover event. Six Annuals were also published between 1992 and 1997. Once this series began, there was a new Superman book each week for every month, except for four weeks out of the year.
- Superman: The Man of Tomorrow was a series published from summer 1995 to fall 1999, ending at issue #15. The series filled in the four weeks of the year that an issue of Action Comics, The Adventures of Superman, Superman (vol. 2) and Superman: The Man of Steel were not published as a fifth week to give 52 weeks (i.e., one year) of Superman stories. The series included a #1,000,000 issue (November 1998) being published between issues #11 and 12 during the "DC One Million" crossover event. As this was a quarterly book, no additional Annuals or Specials were published using this title.
- Superman/Batman was a series featuring DC's two most iconic characters and published from August 2003 until August 2011. This series is not firmly set in continuity, but has been a launching point for several large storylines, including the downfall of Lex Luthor as President of the United States and the return of Kara Zor-El as Supergirl from Krypton. 87 issues and five Annuals were published before the title was cancelled in August 2011 by The New 52 relaunch.
- Superman Confidential was a series published from November 2006 to April 2008, ending at issue #14. The series focused on the telling of early Superman moments.
- Smallville Season 11 - Based on the CW TV series Smallville, this book, which began in 2012 and ended in 2014, picks up six months after the final episode of the series left off with the continuing story of Superman, his friends and his enemies. Written by Bryan Q. Miller, who also served as executive story editor for the television series, Smallville Season 11 is a digital first title that began, like most other digital titles, by releasing three chapters a month digitally, then a print collection; however, it was later decided the four weeks of a month would now play host to a new series of shorter side stories that run parallel to the main story at the time. These parallel story arcs are collected in print as part of the Smallville Season 11 Specials, which run periodically.
- Superman Unchained - Beginning in June 2013, the 12-issue series was the highly anticipated series by Batman, Swamp Thing and American Vampire writer Scott Snyder and artist and DC co-publisher Jim Lee.
- The Adventures of Superman - Unrelated to the previous The Adventures of Superman title, this book, which began in 2013 and ended in 2014, was a three-times-a-month digital comic anthology of non-canonical Superman stories by rotating creative teams. The print edition collected three digital chapters a month.
- Batman/Superman began publication in June 2013. The series is written by Greg Pak and illustrated by Jae Lee. The series features the first encounter between the two heroes as they exist in The New 52. The first arc is set before the formation of the Justice League in the team's own book. The series concluded in May 2016 with issue #32. A second Batman/Superman series was released in August 2019.
- Superman/Wonder Woman written by Charles Soule and drawn by Tony Daniel with participation of others artists like Jack Herbert, explores the relationship between Superman and Wonder Woman. The series launched in October 2013 and was cancelled in May 2016 with issue #29.
- Superman: Lois and Clark is an eight-issue comic book miniseries debuting in October 2015. The series is a spin-off and follow-up to the Superman: Convergence miniseries, which featured a Pre-Flashpoint married Superman and Lois Lane. It was written by writer Dan Jurgens, with art by Lee Weeks, and set nine years after the Convergence event. The series focuses on Superman and his family, including Lois Lane and their 9-year-old son (born in the Convergence event) Jonathan Kent, living in the Post-Flashpoint DC Universe.
- Adventures of Superman: Jon Kent is a six-issue comic book miniseries debuting in March 2023. Written by Tom Taylor and art by Clayton Henry, the story follows Jon Kent as he travels to DC's Injustice universe with Val-Zod to hunt down Ultraman. There, Jon is forced to confront the Injustice universe's own Superman. This miniseries takes place during Injustice 2, Year 5.
- Superman: Lost is a ten-issue comic book miniseries debuting in March 2023 written by Christopher Priest and drawn by Carlo Pagulayan. The out of continuity story follows dual narratives: one where Superman finds himself on a decade-spanning odyssey through the universe, while Lois Lane focuses on her fracturing relationship with Clark Kent after he returns from said journey.

=== Superboy and Supergirl titles ===
- Adventure Comics – Superboy stories moved over from More Fun Comics beginning with issue #103 (1946) and continued (later as a Legion team-up feature) until it became the first Supergirl solo series from #389-424. (1969-1972) A final Superboy series appeared in issues #453-458 (1977-78) before the series was cancelled in 1983. A revival series (2009-11) featured the Legion of Super-Heroes, Superboy (Clark Kent), Superboy-Prime, and Conner Kent, and ended with issue #529.
- Superboy – Ran from March/April 1949 through August 1977 for 230 issues and one Annual.
- Superboy and the Legion of Super-Heroes – The original Superboy series was renamed to this title in 1977. It ran from September 1977 through December 1979 with issues #231–258. The series was then renamed Legion of Super-Heroes (vol. 2) with issues #259–313, which ran from January 1980 to July 1984.
- The New Adventures of Superboy – Ran from January 1980 through June 1984 for a total of 54 issues.
- Superboy: The Comic Book – This second Superboy series was based on the live action series that ran on television. The series was renamed The Adventures of Superboy beginning with issue #11. In all, the series ran from February 1990 through February 1992 with 22 issues.
- Superboy (vol. 3) – The third Superboy series ran from February 1994 through July 2002 with 100 issues, four Annuals, a #1,000,000 issue and a two-issue miniseries titled Superboy Plus/The Power of Shazam! #1 and Superboy Plus/Slither #2. The series featured Conner Kent (Kon-El), the clone of Superman and Lex Luthor.
- Supergirl – Ran from November 1972 through September/October 1974 with 10 issues. The series featured Kara Zor-El, Superman's cousin from Krypton.
- The Daring New Adventures of Supergirl - This series ran from November 1982 through November 1983 with 13 issues.
- Supergirl (vol. 2) – Originally The Daring New Adventures of Supergirl, this series ran from December 1983 through September 1984 with 10 issues plus a movie adaptation.
- Supergirl (vol. 3) – A four-issue miniseries, running from February through May 1994, that detailed the adventures of the Matrix after learning the truth about Lex Luthor.
- Supergirl (vol. 4) – Ran from September 1996 through May 2003 with 82 issues, two Annuals and a one-shot issue titled Supergirl Plus/The Power of Shazam! #1. The series featured the Matrix bonding with Linda Danvers and the Earth Born Angel series. It ended with the "Many Happy Returns" story arc.
- More Fun Comics – Issue #101 (January/February 1945) of this series featured the debut and earliest adventures of Superboy.
- Superboy and the Ravers – Ran from September 1996 through March 1998 with 19 issues. The series featured Superboy (Kon-El) and a team of superheroes.
- Super Sons – The series was launched in February 2017 and ended in May 2018 with 16 issues and one Annual. It focuses on Damian Wayne and Jonathan Kent, the sons of Batman and Superman, as Robin and Superboy, written by Peter J. Tomasi with art by Jorge Jimenez.
- Adventures of the Super Sons – A 12-issue miniseries which served as a continuation of the Super Sons series. The first issue was released in August 2018.

=== Justice League/crossover titles ===
- DC Comics Presents – Ran from July/August 1978 through September 1986 with 97 issues and four Annuals. The series was a monthly title featuring Superman teaming up with another DC character or group of characters in every issue. It was similar to the Batman team-up title The Brave and the Bold.
  - A similar Superman team-up format was done later in Action Comics #584–600 (January 1987–May 1988) and Action Comics Annual #1 (1987).
- JLA – Ran from January 1997 through April 2006 with 127 issues and four Annuals.
- Justice League Adventures – Ran from January 2002 through October 2004 with 34 issues.
- JLA Classified – Ran from January 2005 through March 2008 with 54 issues.
- Justice League Unlimited – Ran from November 2004 through June 2008 with 46 issues. A continuation of Justice League Adventures, picking up where that series left off.
- World's Finest Comics – Originally told separate Superman and Batman stories in the 1940s, it then featured Superman/Batman team-ups in each issue from July 1954 with issue #71 through its cancellation in January 1986 with issue #323.

=== Other titles ===
- Superman's Girl Friend, Lois Lane – Ran from March/April 1958 through September/October 1974 with 137 issues and two Annuals. The series starred Lois Lane.
- Superman's Pal Jimmy Olsen – Ran from September/October 1954 through February/March 1974 with 163 issues. The series starred Jimmy Olsen.
- The Superman Family – Ran from April/May 1974 through September 1982 with 59 issues (numbered #164-222). The series was an anthology title that continued from the numbering of Superman's Pal Jimmy Olsen and was combined with tales of Supergirl and Lois Lane.
- Superman Adventures - Based on, and connected with, the 1990s animated TV series produced by Paul Dini and Bruce Timm.
- Steel (vol. 2) – Ran from February 1994 through July 1998 with 53 issues and two Annuals. This was a solo series that continued the adventures of Steel (John Henry Irons).
- Infinity, Inc. (vol. 2) – Ran from November 2007 through October 2008 with 12 issues. The series featured a new team of Infinity Inc. and starred Steel (John Henry Irons).
- Krypto the Superdog – A six-issue miniseries based on the animated TV series of the same name that ran from November 2007 to April 2008.
- Legion of Super Heroes in the 31st Century - Ran for 20 issues from June 2007 to January 2009. The series was based on the animated TV series Legion of Super-Heroes.
- Superman Family Adventures - Ran for 12 issues from July 2012 to June 2013, written by Art Baltazar and Franco Aureliani and drawn by Baltazar, who had previously worked together on Tiny Titans.
- Dark Knights of Steel is a twelve-issue comic book limited series debuting in November 2021. Written by Tom Taylor with art and story by Yasmine Putri, this story re-imagines the DC mythos through a medieval fantasy lens.

== Other published titles ==
- Superman: The Wedding Album (December 1996)
- DC Comics Presents: Superman #1 (October 2004; a tribute to Julius "Julie" Schwartz)

=== Graphic novels ===
- Superman: End of the Century (2000), TPB: ISBN 978-1-56389-924-9, HC: ISBN 978-1-56389-574-6
- Son of Superman (2000), TPB: ISBN 978-1-56389-596-8, HC: ISBN 978-1-56389-595-1
- Superman: Infinite City (2005), TPB: ISBN 978-1-4012-0066-4, HC: ISBN 978-1-4012-0067-1

=== Miniseries ===
- World of Krypton (1979) – The first comic book miniseries of them all, written by Paul Kupperberg with pencils by Howard Chaykin.
- The Krypton Chronicles (1981) – Written by E. Nelson Bridwell with art by Curt Swan, the three-issue miniseries covers Superman's Kryptonian ancestors.
- The Phantom Zone (1982) – A Steve Gerber miniseries that was controversial for depicting violence against the Metropolis police. The series took a hard look at the ethics of the Phantom Zone, released its villains and centered around Qwex-Ull, a framed Kryptonian who Superman was forced to release in Superman #157, 20 years earlier.
- Superman: The Secret Years (1985) – Covers the Pre-Crisis Superman's years in college.
- The Man of Steel (1986) – Superman's Post-Crisis origin and early history.
- The World of Krypton (1987) - Four-issue miniseries.
- The World of Smallville (1988) - Four-issue miniseries.
- The World of Metropolis (1988) - Four-issue miniseries.
- Superman and Batman: World's Finest (1990) - Three-issue prestige format miniseries featuring Superman and Batman teaming up to battle Lex Luthor and the Joker.
- Superman/Doomsday: Hunter/Prey (1994)
- Superman for All Seasons (1998)
- Superman: The Doomsday Wars (1998–1999)
- Superman: The Dark Side (1998)
- Batman and Superman: World's Finest (1999) - 10-issue miniseries.
- The Kingdom (1999)
- Superman's Nemesis: Lex Luthor (1999)
- Batman/Superman/Wonder Woman: Trinity (2003)
- Superman: Metropolis (2003–2004)
- Superman: Birthright (2003–2004) – A revised take on Superman's origin and early history.
- Superman: Secret Identity (2004) – Four-issue miniseries. TPB: ISBN 978-1-4012-0451-8
- Superman: Strength (2005)
- Superman/Shazam: First Thunder (2005–2006)
- All-Star Superman (2006–2008) – This series did not follow the main continuity of the DC Universe, but was created to tell reinterpreted stories of Superman and his cast of characters (the other such title published by DC was the unfinished All Star Batman and Robin the Boy Wonder). This series was a miniseries running for 12 issues and published irregularly from 2006 to 2008, but may include additional one-shots or miniseries in the future.
- Final Crisis: Superman Beyond (2008–2009) – Two-issue miniseries that occurred during the Final Crisis crossover event.
- Superman & Batman vs. Vampires & Werewolves (2008-2009) – Six-issue miniseries.
- Superman: Secret Origin (2010)
- DC Comics Presents: Superman (2010) – Four-issue miniseries.
- Superman: Year One (2019)
- Superman: Red and Blue (2021) - Six-issue anthology miniseries with only red and blue colors used for internal coloring.

=== One-shots ===
- Superman vs. Muhammad Ali (1978)
- The Computers that Saved Metropolis (1980) – Free giveaway through Radio Shack
- Victory By Computer (1981) – Free giveaway through Radio Shack
- The Computer Masters of Metropolis (1982) – Free giveaway through Radio Shack
- Superman Meets the Quik Bunny (1987) – Free giveaway through Nestlé
- Superman: A Tale of Five Cities (1990)
- Superman: The Earth Stealers (1988)
- The Superman Gallery #1 (1993)
- Supergirl and Team Luthor #1 (1993)
- Superman: Under a Yellow Sun (1994)
- Superman: Man of Steel – Target Superman (1995) – Kenner exclusive
- Superman: Man of Steel – Doomsday is Coming! (1995) – Kenner exclusive
- Superman: Man of Steel – Superman and Batman: Doom Link (1995) – Kenner exclusive
- Superman: Man of Steel – Doomsday Is Coming (1995)
- Superman: The Man of Steel Gallery (1995)
- Superman/Toyman (1996)
- Superman Plus/Legion of Super-Heroes #1 (1997)
- The Superman (Tangent Comics, 1998)
- Superman: Distant Fires (1998)
- Superman: Peace on Earth (1998)
- Superman: Save the Planet (1998)
- Superman: Transformed! (1998)
- JLA: Superpower (1999)
- Superman Forever (1998)
- Superman: King of the World (1999)
- Team Superman (1999)
- Superman: For the Animals (2000)
- Green Lantern/Superman: Legends of the Green Flame (2000)
- Mann and Superman (2000)
- Millennium Edition: Action Comics #1 (2000)
- Millennium Edition: The Man of Steel #1 (2000)
- Sins of Youth: Superman, Jr. and Superboy, Sr. (2000)
- Superman and Batman: World's Funnest (2000)
- Superman Y2K (2000)
- Superman: Emperor Joker (2000)
- Superman: Eradication (2000)
- Superman: Last God of Krypton (2000)
- Superman: Panic in the Sky (2000)
- Superman: Where Is Thy Sting (2001)
- Superman: Lex 2000 (2001)
- DC 1st: Flash/Superman (2002)
- DC 1st: Superman/Lobo (2002)
- Superman: Day of Doom (2002)
- Superman: The 10-Cent Adventure (2003)
- Superman versus Darkseid: Apokolips Now! (2003)
- Superman Beyond (2011)
- Man and Superman 100-Page Super Spectacular (2019)

=== Intercompany crossovers ===
- Marvel Comics
  - Superman vs. The Amazing Spider-Man (1976)
  - Superman and Spider-Man (1981) (published in Marvel Treasury Edition #28; titled "Spider-Man and Superman: The Heroes and the Holocaust!")
  - DC/Marvel: Superman/Spider-Man (2026)
  - Marvel/DC: Spider-Man/Superman (2026)
  - DC versus Marvel Comics/Marvel Comics versus DC #1–4 (1996)
  - Super-Soldier #1 (Amalgam Comics 1996)
  - DC/Marvel: All Access #1–4 (1996)
  - Silver Surfer/Superman #1 (1997)
  - Unlimited Access #1–4 (1997-1998)
  - Super-Soldier: Man of War #1 (Amalgam Comics 1997)
  - The Incredible Hulk vs. Superman #1 (1999)
  - Superman/Fantastic Four: The Infinite Destruction (1999)
  - JLA/Avengers/Avengers/JLA #1–4 (2003)
- Mattel Toys
  - Superman and the Masters of the Universe (published as a special insert in DC Comics Presents #47 (July 1982))
- Milestone Comics
  - Worlds Collide published in
    - Worlds Collide #1
    - Superman: The Man of Steel #35–36
    - Hardware #17–18
    - Superboy #6–7
    - Icon #15–16
    - Steel #6–7
    - Blood Syndicate #16–17
    - Static #14
- Dark Horse Comics
  - Superman/Aliens #1–3 (1995)
  - The Superman/Madman Hullabaloo! #1–3 (1996)
  - Superman vs. The Terminator: Death to the Future #1–4 (2000)
  - Superman vs. Predator #1–3 (2000)
  - Superman/Tarzan: Sons of the Jungle #1–3 (2001)
  - Superman/Aliens 2: God War #1–4 (2002)
  - Superman and Batman versus Aliens and Predator #1–2 (2007)
- Image Comics
  - Superman/The Savage Dragon: Metropolis (1999)
  - Superman/The Savage Dragon: Chicago (2002)
- Warner Bros/Looney Tunes Comics
  - Superman & Bugs Bunny #1–4 (2000)
- Wildstorm Comics
- Wild Times: Wetworks #1, features Superman (2000)
  - Superman/Gen^{13} #1–3 (2000)
  - Planetary/JLA: Terra Occulta (2003)
  - Superman/Thundercats (2004)
  - Superman/Mr. Majestic published in:
    - Action Comics #811 (2004)
    - The Adventures of Superman #624 (2004)
    - Superman (vol. 2) #201 (2004)
    - Majestic #1 (2005)
- Top Cow Comics
  - JLA/Witchblade (2000)
  - The Darkness/Superman #1–2 (2005)
  - JLA/Cyberforce (2005)
- Teshkeel Comics
  - JLA/The 99 #1–6 (2010)

=== Elseworlds ===
All stories are one-shots unless otherwise noted:

- Superman: Speeding Bullets (1993)
- Superman: At Earth's End (1995)
- Superman: Kal (1995)
- Kingdom Come (1996) - Four-issue miniseries.
- Superman's Metropolis (1996) - The first story of a trilogy, followed by Batman: Nosferatu (1999) and Wonder Woman: The Blue Amazon (2003), two more Elseworlds stories.
- Superman: War of the Worlds (1998)
- The Superman Monster (1999) - The sequel to Batman: Two Faces #1 (November 1998), another Elseworlds story.
- Superman & Batman: Generations (1999) - Four-issue miniseries.
  - Superman & Batman: Generations 2 (2001) - Four-issue miniseries.
  - Superman & Batman: Generations 3 (2003-2004) - Twelve-issue miniseries.
- Superman: Last Son of Earth (2000) - Two-issue miniseries.
  - Superman: Last Stand on Krypton (2003) - The sequel to Superman: Last Son of Earth.
- Superman: Red Son (2003) – Three-issue miniseries. HC: ISBN 978-1-4012-2425-7, TPB: ISBN 978-1-4012-0191-3
- Superman: True Brit (2004) – HC: ISBN 978-1-4012-0022-0, TPB: ISBN 978-1-4012-0023-7

=== Secret Files and Origins ===
- Superman Secret Files and Origins #1–2 (1998–1999)
- Team Superman Secret Files and Origins #1 (1998)
- Superman Villains Secret Files and Origins #1 (1998)
- Superman: Metropolis Secret Files and Origins #1 (2000)
- President Luthor Secret Files and Origins #1 (2001)
- Superman: Our Worlds at War Secret Files and Origins #1 (2001)
- Superman/Batman Secret Files and Origins 2003 (2003)
- Superman Secret Files and Origins 2004 (2004)
- Superman Secret Files and Origins 2005 (2005)
- Superman Secret Files and Origins 2009 #1 (2009)

== Collected editions ==
=== The Golden Age (1938-1958) ===
Note: Since Superman was published continuously while most other superhero titles were gradually discontinued after World War II, the 1950s is sometimes alternatively referred to as the "Atomic Age" of Comics.

| Title | Material collected | Publisher(s) | Date | Format | ISBN |
Daily strip reprints
| Superman: The Dailies | 1939–1942 | Kitchen Sink Press | November 25, 1998 | HC | 978-1-56389-471-8 |
| Superman: The Dailies | 1939–1942 | Sterling Publishing | June 2006 | HC | 978-1-40273-785-5 |
| Superman: The Dailies | Vol. 1 (1939–1940) | Kitchen Sink Press | July 12, 2000 | TP | 978-1-56389-460-2 |
| Superman: The Dailies | Vol. 2 (1940–1941) | Kitchen Sink Press | August 9, 2000 | TP | 978-1-56389-461-9 |
| Superman: The Dailies | Vol. 3 (1941–1942) | Kitchen Sink Press | September 7, 2000 | TP | 978-1-56389-462-6 |
| Superman: The Golden Age Dailies | 1942–1944 | IDW Publishing | March 22, 2017 | HC | 978-1-63140-383-5 |
| Superman: The Golden Age Dailies | 1944–1947 | IDW Publishing | May 9, 2017 | HC | 978-1-68405-197-7 |
| Superman: The Golden Age Dailies | 1947–1949 | IDW Publishing | May 15, 2019 | HC | 978-1-68405-437-4 |
Sunday strip reprints
| Superman: The Sunday Classics | 1939–1943 | Kitchen Sink Press | December 30, 1998 | HC | 978-1-56389-463-3 |
| Superman: The Sunday Classics | 1939–1943 | Kitchen Sink Press | May 3, 2000 | TP | 978-1-56389-472-5 |
| Superman: The Sunday Classics | 1939–1943 | Sterling Publishing | 2006 | HC | 978-1-40273-786-2 |
| Superman: The Golden Age Sundays | 1943–1946 | IDW Publishing | January 29, 2014 | HC | 978-1-61377-797-8 |
| Superman: The Golden Age Sundays | 1946–1949 | IDW Publishing | November 5, 2011 | HC | 978-1-63140-109-1 |
| Superman: The Atomic Age Sundays | 1949–1953 | IDW Publishing | July 15, 2015 | HC | 978-1-63140-262-3 |
| Superman: The Atomic Age Sundays | 1953–1956 | IDW Publishing | March 23, 2016 | HC | 978-1-63140-537-2 |
| Superman: The Atomic Age Sundays | 1956–1959 | IDW Publishing | January 3, 2018 | HC | 978-1-68405-061-1 |
Comic magazine reprints
| The Adventures of Superboy | More Fun Comics #101-107, Adventure Comics #103-120 | DC Comics | 2010 | HC | 978-1-4012-2783-8 |
| Superman: The Action Comics Archives Vols. 1-5 | Action Comics #1, 7–85 | DC Comics | 1997-2007 | HC | 1-56389-335-5 |
| Superman Archives Vols. 1-8 | Superman #1–35 | DC Comics | 1989-2010 | HC | 1-40120-630-1 |
| Superman in World's Finest Comics Archives Vols. 1-2 | New York World's Fair Comics #1–2; World's Best Comics #1; World's Finest Comics #2–32 | DC Comics | 2004, 2009 | HC | 1-40120-151-2 |
| The Superman Chronicles Vols. 1-10 | Action Comics #1–55; New York World's Fair Comics #1-2; Superman #1-19, World's Best/Finest #1-7 | DC Comics | 2006-2012 | TPB | 1-40120-764-2 |
| Superman: The Golden Age Omnibus Vols. 1-7 | Action Comics #1–43; New York World's Fair #1-2; Superman #1–65; World's Best/Finest Comics #1-47 | DC Comics | 2013-2022 | HC | 978-1-4012-4189-6 |
| Superman: The Golden Age Vols. 1-5 | Each volume reprints 1/2 of a Golden Age Omnibus, up to 2.5 | DC Comics | 2016-2020 | TPB | 978-1-4012-6109-2 |
| DC Finest: Superboy: The Superdog from Krypton | Adventure Comics #199-216 and Superboy #33-43 | DC Comics | 2025 | TPB | 978-1-7995-0136-7 |
| Superman in the Forties | Stories from Look magazine; the Superman daily newspaper comic strip; Action Comics #1-2, 14, 23, 64, 93, 107; Superman #1, 23, 40, 53, 58, 61; Superboy #5; World's Finest Comics #37 | DC Comics | 2005 | TPB | 978-1401204570 |
| Superman in the Fifties | Stories from Superman #65, 96, 97, 79, 80, 127; Action Comics #151, 242, 252, 254, 255; World's Finest Comics #68, 75; Superman's Girl Friend, Lois Lane #8; Superman's Pal Jimmy Olsen #13; Showcase #9; Adventure Comics #210 | DC Comics | 2002 | TPB | 1-5638-9826-8 |

=== The Silver Age (1958-1970) ===
Note: Though historians typically date the start of the Silver Age of Comics at Showcase #4 in 1956, most Superman collections begin with the promotion of Mort Weisinger as chief editor in 1958.

| Title | Material collected | Publication Date | ISBN |
|---|---|---|---|
| Superman: The Silver Age Dailies | Vol. 1 (1959–1961) | July 31, 2013 | 978-1-61377-666-7 |
| Superman: The Silver Age Dailies | Vol. 2 (1961–1963) | April 16, 2014 | 978-1-61377-923-1 |
| Superman: The Silver Age Dailies | Vol. 3 (1963–1966) | December 10, 2014 | 978-1-63140-179-4 |
| Superman: The Silver Age Sundays | 1959–1963 | November 28, 2018 | 978-1-68405-387-2 |
| Superman: The Silver Age Sundays | 1963–1966 | November 20, 2019 | 978-1-68405-554-8 |
| Legion of Super-Heroes Archives, Vols. 1-9 | Legion appearances in Adventure Comics #257-392, Action Comics #378-392, and Superman's Pal Jimmy Olsen #72, 26, and 106. | 1991-1999 | 1-56389-020-8 |
| Legion of Super-Heroes: The Silver Age Omnibus, Vols. 1-3 | Reprints material from Legion Archives 1-9 | 2017-2020 | 978-1-4012-7102-2 |
| Supergirl Archives, Vols. 1-2 | Superman #123, backup stories in Action Comics #252-285 | 2001, 2003 | 1-56389-737-7 |
| Supergirl: The Silver Age Omnibus, Vols. 1-2 | Superman #123, backup stories in Action Comics #252-376 | 2016, 2018 | 978-1-4012-7861-8 |
| DC Finest: Supergirl: The Girl of Steel | Action Comics #252-288 and others | | 978-1-77952-990-9 |
| Superman's Girl Friend Lois Lane Archives Vol. 1 | Showcase #9-10, Superman's Girl Friend Lois Lane #1-8 | 2011 | 978-1-4012-3315-0 |
| Superman: The Man of Tomorrow Archives Vols. 1-3 | Action Comics #241–268; Superman #122–139 | 2004-2014 | 1-40120-156-3 |
| 'Superman: The Silver Age Omnibus' | Reprints material from Man of Tomorrow Archives 1-3 | May 2024 | 978-1-77952-293-1 |
| DC Finest Superman Family: The Giant Turtle Man | Superman's Girl Friend Lois Lane #19-28, Superman's Pal Jimmy Olsen #47-56 and others | | 978-1-7995-0110-7 |
| Superman: Tales of the Bizarro World | Adventure Comics #285-299 | | 1-56389-624-9 |
| Superman: The Amazing Transformations of Jimmy Olsen | Superman's Pal Jimmy Olsen #22, 28, 31–33, 41–42, 44, 49, 53, 59, 65, 72, 77, 80, 85, 105; The Superman Family #173 | | 1401213693 |
| Showcase Presents Superman Vols. 1-4 | Action Comics #241–309; Superman #122–166 | 2005-2008 | 1-40120-758-8 |
| Showcase Presents Superman Family Vols. 1-4 | Superman's Pal Jimmy Olsen #1–53; Showcase #9-10; Superman #28; Superman's Girl Friend Lois Lane #1-26 | 2006-2013 | 1-40120-787-1 |
| Showcase Presents: World's Finest Vols. 1-4 | World's Finest Comics #71-202 | 2007-2012 | |
| Superman in the Sixties | Stories from Action Comics #289; Adventure Comics #294; Superboy #85, 106; Superman #141, 146, 156, 161, 164, 165, 169, 170; Superman's Girl Friend, Lois Lane #20, 42; Superman's Pal Jimmy Olsen #53, 79; World's Finest Comics #175 | 1-56389-522-6 | 978-1-4012-1697-9 |

=== The Bronze Age (1970-1986) ===
Following the departure of Mort Weisenger, in the fall of 1970, Jack Kirby began writing Jimmy Olsen at issue #233, Rose and the Thorn debuted in Lois Lane #105, Batman was temporarily dropped from World's Finest team-ups, and Dennis O'Neil began writing Superman. The Legion and Supergirl switched titles, in Action and Adventure Comics, respectively.

| Title | Material collected | Publication Date | ISBN |
|---|---|---|---|
| DC Finest Legion of Super-Heroes: Zap Goes the Legion | Adventure Comics #374-380, Action Comics #378-392, Superboy #172-203 | 2025 | 978-1-77952-849-0 |
| Jimmy Olsen: Adventures by Jack Kirby Vol. 1 | Superman's Pal Jimmy Olsen #133–139 and 141 | | 1563899841 |
| Jimmy Olsen: Adventures by Jack Kirby Vol. 2 | Superman's Pal Jimmy Olsen #142–148 and 150 | | 1401202594 |
| Legion of Super-Heroes Archives, vols. 10-13 | Stories from Superboy #172-233; Karate Kid #1 | 2000-2012 | 1-56389-628-1 |
| Superman: Kryptonite Nevermore | Superman #233–238 and 240–242 | | 978-1779507525 |
| DC Finest: Superman: Kryptonite Nevermore | Action Comics #393-406 and Superman #233–242 | 2025 | 978-1799501657 |
| Superman: The Adventures of Nightwing and Flamebird | Stories from Superman Family #173 and #183-194 | | 978-1-4012-2525-4 |
| World's Finest: The Guardians of Earth | World's Finest Comics #195–214 | | 978-1779501783 |
| Superman/Batman: The Saga of the Super-Sons | Super-sons stories from World's Finest Comics #215-263 and Elseworlds 80-Page Giant #1 | | 978-1779507525 |
| Superboy and the Legion of Super-Heroes vols. 1-2 | Superboy #234-258; DC Super Stars #17, All-New Collectors' Edition #C-55, and DC Comics Presents #13-14 | 2017-2018 | 978-1-4012-7291-3 |
| Showcase Presents DC Comics Presents: Superman Team-Ups Vols. 1-2 | DC Comics Presents #1–50, Annual #1 | | 1-40122-535-7 |
| Daring New Adventures of Supergirl Vols. 1-2 | The Daring New Adventures of Supergirl #1-13, Supergirl vol. 2 #14-23 | | 978-1-4012-6346-1 |
| Superman: Phantom Zone | The Phantom Zone (1982 series) #1-4, DC Comics Presents #97 | | 978-1-4012-4051-6 |
| Superman in the Seventies | Stories from Superman #233, 238, 247, 249, 270, 271, 276, 286, 287, 298, 300; Action Comics #436, 466, 484, 491, 494; DC Comics Presents #14; Superman's Pal Jimmy Olsen #133; Superman's Girl Friend, Lois Lane #106 | | 1-56389-638-9 |
| Superman in the Eighties | Stories from Action Comics #507, 508, 554, 595, 600, 644; Adventures of Superman #408; DC Comics Presents #29; Superman (vol. 2) #30 | | 1-40120-952-1 |
| Adventures of Superman: Gil Kane | Superman #367, 372, 375, Action Comics #539, 541, 544, 545, 546 and 551–554, Superman Special #1, 2 and DC Comics Presents Annual #3 | | 140123674X |
| Adventures of Superman: José Luis García-López | Superman #294, 301, 302, 307, 309, 347, DC Comics Presents #1–4 and 17 and All-New Collector’s Edition C-54 | | 1401238564 |
| Superman: Whatever Happened to the Man of Tomorrow? | Superman #423; Action Comics #583, Annual #11; DC Comics Presents #85 | | SC: 1563893150 |

=== "Post-Crisis" Era (1986-2004) ===
Following the events of Crisis on Infinite Earths, Superman's history was rebooted and a new origin was published in the Man of Steel miniseries. This timeline largely remained in place until the end of the Ending Battle storyline (2004), after which Superman: Birthright became the official origin. They are printed here in the chronology of the storylines, rather than the publication dates of either the original comics or collections.

| Title | Material collected | ISBN | Date |
|---|---|---|---|
| Lois & Clark: The New Adventures of Superman | The Man of Steel #2; Superman (vol. 2) #9, 11, Annual #1; Action Comics #600, 655; Adventures of Superman #445, 462, 466; an introduction by John Byrne | SC: 1-56389-128-X | |
| Superman: The Man of Steel Vols. 1-9 | The Man of Steel #1–6; Action Comics #584-600; Superman (vol.2) #1-22, Annual #1-2; Adventures of Superman #424-444; Legion of Super-Heroes (vol. 3) #37-38; Doom Patrol #10; Booster Gold #23 | SC: 0-93028-928-5 | |
| Superman: Exile | Superman (vol. 2) #28–30, 32–33; Adventures of Superman #451–456; Action Comics #643, Annual #2 | SC: 1-56389-438-6 | |
| Superman: The Exile & Other Stories Omnibus | Action Comics #643–646, Annual #2; The Adventures of Superman #445–460; Superman (vol. 2) #23–37 | 1-40127-823-X | |
| Superman: The Triangle Era Omnibus Vol. 1 | Action Comics #659-673; The Adventures of Superman #472-486; Superman (vol. 2) #49-64; Superman: The Man of Steel #1–8 | 1-77952-816-7 | |
| Superman: Eradication! (the origin of the Eradicator) | Action Comics #651–652; Adventures of Superman #460, 464–465; Superman (vol. 2) #41–42 | SC: 1-56389-193-X | |
| Superman: Dark Knight Over Metropolis | Superman (vol. 2) #44; Adventures of Superman #466–467; Action Comics #653–654, Annual #1 | SC: 1-40125-152-8 | October 2013 |
| Superman: The Power Within | Action Comics Weekly #601–641, 658, Superman (vol. 2) #48; Adventures of Superman #471 | SC: 1-40125-152-8 | January 2015 |
| Superman: Krisis of the Krimson Kryptonite | Superman (vol. 2) #49–50; Adventures of Superman #472–473; Action Comics #659–660; Starman (vol. 2) #28 | SC: 1-56389-275-8 | |
| Superman: Time and Time Again | Action Comics #663–665; Adventures of Superman #476–478; Superman (vol. 2) #54–55, 61, 73 | SC: 1-56389-129-8 | |
| Superman: Panic in the Sky | Action Comics #674–675; Superman: The Man of Steel #9–10; Superman (vol. 2) #65–66; Adventures of Superman #488–489 | SC: 1-56389-094-1 | |
| Superman: They Saved Luthor's Brain | Superman (vol. 2) #2; Action Comics #660, 668, 672, 676–678 | SC: 1-56389-601-X | |
| The Death of Superman | Superman: The Man of Steel #17–19; Superman (vol. 2) #73–75; Adventures of Superman #496–497; Action Comics #683–684; Justice League America #69 | SC: 1-56389-097-6 | |
| World Without a Superman | Adventures of Superman #498–500; Action Comics #685–686; Superman (vol. 2) #76–77; Superman: The Legacy of Superman #1; Superman: The Man of Steel #20–21 | SC: 1-56389-118-2 | |
| The Return of Superman | Action Comics #687–691; Adventures of Superman #500–505; Green Lantern (vol. 3) #46; Superman (vol. 2) #78–82; Superman: The Man of Steel #22–26 | SC: 1-56389-149-2 | |
| The Death and Return of Superman Omnibus | Superman: The Man of Steel #17–26; Superman (vol. 2) #73–82; Adventures of Superman #496–505; Action Comics #683–692; Green Lantern (vol. 3) #46; Justice League America #69; Superman: The Legacy of Superman #1 | HC: 1-40121-550-5 | |
| Superman/Doomsday Omnibus | Superman: The Doomsday Wars #1–3; Superman/Doomsday: Hunter/Prey #1–3; Doomsday Annual #1; Adventures of Superman #594; Superman (vol. 2) #175 | SC: 1-40121-107-0 | |
| Superman: The Death of Clark Kent | Superman (vol. 2) #100–102; Adventures of Superman #523–525; Action Comics #710–711; Superman: The Man of Steel #44–46; Superman: The Man of Tomorrow #1 | SC: 1-56389-323-1 | |
| Superman: The Trial of Superman | Superman (vol. 2) #106–108; Adventures of Superman #529–531; Action Comics #716–717; Superman: The Man of Steel #50–52; Superman: The Man of Tomorrow #3 | SC: 1-56389-331-2 | |
| Superman: The Wedding and Beyond | Superman (vol. 2) #118; Superman: The Wedding Album #1; Adventures of Superman #541; Action Comics #728; Superman: The Man of Steel #63 | SC: 1-56389-392-4 | |
| Superman: Transformed! | Action Comics #729, 732; Adventures of Superman #542, 545; Superman (vol. 2) #119, 122–123; Superman: The Man of Steel #64, 67 | SC: 1-56389-406-8 | |
| Superman vs. the Revenge Squad | Action Comics #726, 730; Adventures of Superman #539, 542–543; Superman: The Man of Steel #61, 65; Superman: The Man of Tomorrow #7 | SC: 1-56389-487-4 | |
| Superman Blue Vol. 1 | Action Comics #732–734; Adventures of Superman #545–547; Superman (vol. 2) #122–125, Annual (vol. 2) #9; Superman: The Man of Steel #67–69 | SC: 1-40128-091-9 | |
| Superman: City of Tomorrow Vol. 1 | Action Comics #760–763, Adventures of Superman #573–576, Superman (vol. 2) #151–154, Superman: The Man of Steel #95–98; Superman: Y2K #1 | SC: 1-40129-508-8 | |
| Superman: City of Tomorrow Vol. 2 | Action Comics #764–768; Adventures of Superman #577–581; Superman (vol. 2) #155–159; Superman: The Man of Steel #99–103 | SC: 1-77950-312-1 | |
| Superman: No Limits! | Action Comics #760–761; Adventures of Superman #574; Superman (vol. 2) #151–153; Superman: The Man of Steel #95–97 | SC: 1-56389-699-0 | |
| Superman: Endgame | Action Comics #763; Adventures of Superman #576; Superman (vol. 2) #154; Superman: The Man of Steel #98; Superman: Y2K #1 | SC: 1-56389-701-6 | |
| Superman: 'Til Death Do Us Part | Superman (vol. 2) #155–157; Adventures of Superman #577–578; Superman: The Man of Steel #99–100; Action Comics #764–765 | SC: 1-56389-862-4 | |
| Superman: Critical Condition | Adventures of Superman #579–580; Superman: The Man of Steel #101–102; Action Comics #766–767; Superman (vol. 2) #158; the lead story from Superman: Metropolis Secret Files and Origins #1 | SC: 1-56389-949-3 | |
| Superman: Emperor Joker | Superman (vol. 2) #160–161; Adventures of Superman #582–583; Superman: The Man of Steel #104–105; Action Comics #769–770; Superman: Emperor Joker #1 | SC: 1-40121-193-3 | |
| Superman: President Lex | Adventures of Superman #581; President Luthor Secret Files and Origins #1; Superman: Lex 2000; Superman (vol. 2) #162–165; Superman: The Man of Steel #108–110; Action Comics #773 | SC: 1-56389-974-4 | |
| Superman: Our Worlds at War Book 1 | Superman (vol. 2) #171–172; Adventures of Superman #593–594; Superman: The Man of Steel #115–116; Action Comics #780–781; Supergirl (vol. 4) #59; JLA: Our Worlds at War #1 | SC: 1-56389-915-9 | |
| Superman: Our Worlds at War Book 2 | Superman (vol. 2) #173; Adventures of Superman #595; Superman: The Man of Steel #117; Action Comics #782; Wonder Woman (vol. 2) #172–173; Young Justice #36; Impulse #77; Superboy (vol. 3) #91; World's Finest: Our Worlds at War #1 | SC: 1-56389-916-7 | |
| Superman: Our Worlds at War Omnibus | Action Comics #780–782; The Adventures of Superman #593–595; Superman (vol. 2) #171–173; Superman: The Man of Steel #115–117; Superboy (vol. 3) #91; Supergirl (vol. 4) #59; Wonder Woman (vol. 2) #172–173; Impulse #77; Young Justice #36; World's Finest: Our Worlds at War #1; JLA: Our Worlds at War #1 | 1-40121-129-1 | |
| Superman: Return to Krypton | Action Comics #776, 793; Adventures of Superman #589, 606; Superman (vol. 2) #166–167, 184; Superman: The Man of Steel #111, 128 | SC: 1-40120-194-6 | |
| Superman: Ending Battle | Action Comics #795–796; Adventures of Superman #608–609; Superman (vol. 2) #186–187; Superman: The Man of Steel #130–131 | SC: 1-40120-194-6 | |
| Superman: Day of Doom | Superman: Day of Doom #1–4 | SC: 1-40120-086-9 | |

=== Pre-Flashpoint Era (2004-2011) ===
This era saw additional changes to the timeline with the releases of Infinite Crisis, Final Crisis, and Superman:Secret Origin as well as the impact of outside media such as Smallville and Superman Returns. Many Bronze Age elements were restored to Superman's backstory as a result.

| Title | Material collected | ISBN | Date |
|---|---|---|---|
| Superman: Birthright | Superman: Birthright #1–12 | HC: 1-40120-251-9 SC: 1-40120-252-7 | |
| Superman: The Man of Steel - Believe | Action Comics #810 and (vol. 2) #0; Adventures of Superman #623; Superman (vol. 2) #185; Adventures of Superman Digital Chapter 1; the two-page origin story from Superman for Tomorrow; Superman 80-Page Giant #1–2 | SC: 1-40124-705-9 | |
| Superman: Godfall | Action Comics #812–813; Adventures of Superman #625–626; Superman (vol. 2) #202–203 | HC: 1-40120-376-0 | |
| Superman: The Wrath of Gog | Action Comics #814–819; back-up stories from #812–813 | SC: 1-40120-450-3 | |
| Superman: In the Name of Gog | Action Comics #820–825 | SC: 1-40120-757-X | |
| Lex Luthor: Man of Steel | Lex Luthor: Man of Steel #1–5 | SC: 1-40120-454-6 | |
| Superman for Tomorrow Vol. 1 | Superman (vol. 2) #204–209 | HC: 1-40120-351-5 SC: 1-40120-352-3 | |
| Superman for Tomorrow Vol. 2 | Superman (vol. 2) #210–215 | HC: 1-40120-715-4 SC: 1-40120-448-1 | |
| Superman: Unconventional Warfare | Adventures of Superman #627–632; back-up stories from #625–626 | SC: 1-40120-449-X | |
| Superman: That Healing Touch | Adventures of Superman #633–638; the lead story from Superman Secret Files and Origins 2004 | SC: 1-40120-453-8 | |
| Superman: Sacrifice | Superman (vol. 2) #218–220; Adventures of Superman #642–643; Action Comics #829; Wonder Woman (vol. 2) #219–220 | SC: 1-40120-919-X | |
| Superman: Ruin Revealed | Adventures of Superman #640–641, 644–647 | SC: 1-40120-920-3 | |
| Superman: The Journey | Superman (vol. 2) #217, 221–225; pages from Action Comics #831 | SC: 1-40120-918-1 | |
| Superman: Strange Attractors | Action Comics #827–828, 830–835 | SC: 1-40120-917-3 | |
| Superman: Infinite Crisis | Superman (vol. 2) #226; Action Comics #836; Adventures of Superman #649; stories from Infinite Crisis Secret Files and Origins 2006 | SC: 1-40120-953-X | |
| Superman: Up, Up, and Away! (One Year Later) | Superman #650–653; Action Comics #837–840 | SC: 1-40120-954-8 | |
| Superman: Back in Action | Action Comics #841–843; DC Comics Presents #4, 17, 24 | SC: 1-40121-263-8 | |
| Superman: Camelot Falls Vol. 1 | Superman #654–658 | HC: 1-40121-204-2 SC: 1-40121-205-0 | |
| Superman: Camelot Falls Vol. 2 | Superman #662–664, 667; Annual #13 | HC: 1-40121-566-1 SC: 1-40121-865-2 | |
| Superman: Last Son | Action Comics #844–846, 851; Annual #11 | HC: 1-40121-343-X SC: 1-40121-586-6 | |
| Superman: Last Son - The Deluxe Edition | Action Comics #844–846, 851, 855–857; Annual #10-11 | HC: 9781779509116 | |
| Superman: Last Son of Krypton | Action Comics #844–846, 851, 866–870; Annual #11 | SC: 978-1401237790 | |
| Superman: The Third Kryptonian | Superman #668–670; Action Comics #847; a back-up story from Superman Annual #13 | SC: 1-40121-987-X | |
| Superman: Redemption | Superman #659, 666; Action Comics #848–849 | SC: 1-40121-636-6 | |
| Superman: 3-2-1 Action | Superman #665; Action Comics #852–854; Legends of the DC Universe #14 | SC: 1-40121-680-3 | |
| Superman: Escape from Bizarro World | Action Comics #855–857; Superman (vol. 2) #140; DC Comics Presents #71; Superman: The Man of Steel #5 | HC: 1-40121-794-X SC: 1-40122-033-9 | |
| Superman and the Legion of Super-Heroes | Action Comics #858–863 | HC: 1-40121-819-9 SC: 1-40121-904-7 | |
| Superman: Shadows Linger | Superman #671–675 | SC: 1-40122-125-4 | |
| Superman: The Coming of Atlas | Superman #677–680; 1st Issue Special #1 | HC: 1-40122-131-9 SC: 1-40122-132-7 | |
| Superman: Brainiac | Action Comics #866–870 | HC: 1-40122-087-8 SC: 1-40122-088-6 | |
| Superman: New Krypton Vol. 1 | Superman: New Krypton Special #1; Superman's Pal Jimmy Olsen Special #1; Superman #681; Action Comics #871; Adventure Comics Special featuring Guardian #1 | HC: 1-40122-329-X SC: 1-40122-330-3 | |
| Superman: New Krypton Vol. 2 | Superman #682–683; Action Comics #872–873; Supergirl (vol. 4) #35–36 | HC: 1-40122-319-2 SC: 1-40122-320-6 | |
| Superman: Mon-El Vol. 1 | Superman #684–690; Action Comics #874, parts of Annual #10 | HC: 1-40122-638-8 SC: 1-40122-635-3 | |
| Superman: Nightwing and Flamebird Vol. 1 | Action Comics #875–879, Annual #12 | HC: 1-40122-638-8 SC: 1-40122-639-6 | |
| Superman: New Krypton Vol. 3 | Superman: World of New Krypton #1–5; parts of Action Comics Annual #10 | HC: 1-40122-636-1 SC: 1-40122-637-X | |
| Superman: Codename - Patriot | Superman's Pal Jimmy Olsen Special #2; Superman #691; Supergirl (vol. 4) #44; Action Comics #880; Superman: World of New Krypton #6 | HC: 1-40122-658-2 | |
| Superman: New Krypton Vol. 4 | Superman: World of New Krypton #6–12 | HC: 1-40122-774-0 | |
| Superman: Mon-El Vol. 2 - Man of Valor | Superman #692–697, Annual #14; Superman Secret Files and Origins 2009 #1; Adventure Comics #11 | HC: 1-84856-972-6 | |
| Superman: Last Stand of New Krypton Vol. 1 | Superman: Last Stand of New Krypton #1–2; Adventure Comics #8–9; Superman #698; Supergirl (vol. 4) #51 | HC: 1-40122-774-0 | |
| Superman: Nightwing and Flamebird Vol. 2 | Action Comics #883–889; Superman #696 | HC: 1-40122-939-5 | |
| Superman: Last Stand of New Krypton Vol. 2 | Superman: Last Stand of New Krypton #3; Supergirl (vol. 4) #52; Superman #699; stories from Adventure Comics #10–11 | HC: 1-40123-036-9 | |
| Superman: War of the Supermen | Superman: War of the Supermen #0–4; a page from Superman #700 | HC: 1-40122-967-0 | |
| Superman: The Black Ring Vol. 1 | Action Comics #890–895 | HC: 1-40123-033-4 | |
| Superman: The Black Ring Vol. 2 | Action Comics #896–900, Annual #13; Secret Six (vol. 3) #29 | HC: 1-40123-203-5 | |
| Superman: Grounded Vol. 1 | Superman #700–706 | HC: 1-40123-075-X | |
| Superman: Grounded Vol. 2 | Superman #707–711, 713–714 | HC: 1-40123-316-3 | |
| Superman: The Return of Doomsday | Steel (vol. 3) #1, Outsiders (vol. 4) #37, Justice League of America (vol. 2) #55, Superman/Batman Annual #5, Superboy (vol. 3) #6 | SC: 1-40123-253-1 | |
| Superman: Reign of Doomsday | Action Comics #900–904 | HC: 1-40123-345-7 | |

==== Superman/Batman ====
This series replaced Superman: The Man of Steel and has been collected in the following hardcovers and trade paperbacks.

| Title | Material collected | ISBN |
|---|---|---|
| Superman/Batman: Public Enemies | Superman/Batman #1–6; Superman/Batman Secret Files and Origins 2003 | HC: 1-40120-323-X SC: 1-40120-220-9 |
| Superman/Batman: Supergirl | Superman/Batman #8–13 | HC: 1-40120-347-7 SC: 1-40120-250-0 |
| Superman/Batman: Absolute Power | Superman/Batman #14–18 | HC: 1-40120-447-3 SC: 1-40120-714-6 |
| Superman/Batman: Vengeance | Superman/Batman #20–25 | HC: 1-40120-921-1 SC: 1-40121-043-0 |
| Superman/Batman: Enemies Among Us | Superman/Batman #28–33 | HC: 1-40121-330-8 SC: 1-40121-243-3 |
| Superman/Batman: Torment | Superman/Batman #37–42 | HC: 1-40121-700-1 SC: 1-40121-740-0 |
| Superman/Batman: The Search for Kryptonite | Superman/Batman #44–49 | HC: 1-40121-933-0 |
| Superman/Batman: Finest Worlds | Superman/Batman #50–56 | HC: 1-40122-331-1 |
| Superman/Batman: Night and Day | Superman/Batman #60–63, 65–67 | HC: 1-40122-792-9 |
| Superman/Batman: Big Noise | Superman/Batman #64, 68–71 | SC: 1-40122-914-X |
| Superman/Batman: Worship | Superman/Batman #72–75, Annual #4 | SC: 1-40123-032-6 |
| Superman/Batman: Sorcerer Kings | Superman/Batman #78–84 | HC: 1-40123-266-3 SC: 1-40123-446-1 |
| Superman/Batman Omnibus Vol 1 | Superman/Batman #1–43, Annual #1–2; Superman/Batman: Secret Files and Origins 2003 #1 | HC: 1-77950-029-7 |
| Superman/Batman Omnibus Vol 2 | Superman/Batman #44–87, Annual #3–5 | HC: 1-77951-023-3 |

=== The New 52 (2011-2016) ===
Post-Flashpoint Superman as part of DC's The New 52.

| Title | Material collected | ISBN |
| Action Comics (vol. 2) | | |
|---|---|---|
| Superman by Grant Morrison Omnibus (The New 52) | Action Comics (vol. 2) #0–18, Annual (vol. 2) #1 | 1-77951-397-6 |
| Superman: Action Comics Vol. 1 - Superman and the Men of Steel | Action Comics (vol. 2) #1–8 | HC: 1-40123-546-8 |
| Superman: Action Comics Vol. 2 - Bulletproof | Action Comics (vol. 2) #0, 9–12, Annual (vol. 2) #1 | HC: 1-40124-101-8 |
| Superman: Action Comics Vol. 3 - At the End of Days | Action Comics (vol. 2) #13–18 | |
| Superman: Action Comics Vol. 4 - Hybrid | Action Comics (vol. 2) #19–24, Annual (vol. 2) #2; Young Romance #1 | |
| Superman: Action Comics Vol. 5 - What Lies Beneath | Action Comics (vol. 2) #25–29 | |
| Superman: Action Comics Vol. 6 - Superdoom | Action Comics (vol. 2) #30–35, Annual (vol. 2) #3 | |
| Superman: Action Comics Vol. 7 - Under the Skin | Action Comics (vol. 2) #36–40, Action Comics: Futures End #1 | |
| Superman: Action Comics Vol. 8 - Truth | Action Comics (vol. 2) #41–47, DC Sneek Peak: Action Comics #1 | |
| Superman: Action Comics Vol. 9 - Last Rites | Action Comics (vol. 2) #48–52 | |
| Superman (vol. 3) | | |
| Superman Vol. 1: What Price Tomorrow? | Superman (vol. 3) #1–6 | HC: 1-40123-468-2 SC: 978-1-4012-3686-1 |
| Superman Vol. 2: Secrets and Lies | Superman (vol. 3) #7–12, Annual (vol. 3) #1 | HC: 1-40124-028-3 |
| Superman Vol. 3: Fury at World's End | Superman (vol. 3) #0, 13–17 | |
| Superman: H'el on Earth | Superman (vol. 3) #13–17; Superboy (vol. 6) #14–17, Annual (vol. 2) #1; Supergirl (vol. 6) #14–17 | |
| Superman Vol. 4: Psi-War | Superman (vol. 3) #18–24, Annual (vol. 3) #2 | |
| Superman Vol. 5: Under Fire | Superman (vol. 3) #25–31 | |
| Superman: Doomed | Superman: Doomed #1–2; Action Comics (vol. 2) #30–35, Annual (vol. 2) #3; Superman/Wonder Woman #7–12, Annual #1; Superman (vol. 3) #30; Supergirl (vol. 2) #34–35; Batman/Superman (vol. 2) #11 | |
| Superman: The Men of Tomorrow | Superman (vol. 3) #32–39 | HC: 1401252397 SC: 1401258689 |
| Superman Vol. 1: Before Truth | Superman (vol. 3) #40–44; Divergence #1 | HC: 1401259812 SC: 1401265103 |
| Superman Vol. 2: Return to Glory | Superman (vol. 3) #45–52, Annual (vol. 3) #3 | HC: 1401265111 SC: 1401268307 |
| Superman: The Final Days of Superman | Superman (vol. 3) #51–52; Action Comics (vol. 3) #51–52; Batman/Superman (vol. 2) #31–32; Superman/Wonder Woman #28–29 | HC: 9781401267223 SC: 9781401269142 |

=== DC Rebirth ===
Superman comics featuring the Pre-Flashpoint version of the character within the New 52 universe. Action Comics resumed the legacy numbering. This publishing initiative lasted from 2016-2018.

Standard editions
| Title | Material collected | ISBN |
|---|---|---|
| Superman by Peter J. Tomasi & Patrick Gleason Omnibus | Superman #1–25, 27–28, 33–39, 42–45, Annual #1, Special #1; Superman: Rebirth #1; Action Comics #975–976, 1000; Super Sons #11–12; Teen Titans #975–976 | 1-77950-925-1 |
| Superman: Lois and Clark | Superman: Lois and Clark #1–8 | |
| Action Comics | | |
| Superman: Action Comics Vol. 1 - Path of Doom | Action Comics #957–962 | |
| Superman: Action Comics Vol. 2 - Welcome to the Planet | Justice League (vol. 2) #52, Action Comics #963–966 | |
| Superman: Action Comics Vol. 3 - Men of Steel | Action Comics #967–972 | |
| Superman Reborn | Action Comics #975–976, Superman (vol. 4) #18–19 | |
| Superman: Action Comics Vol. 4 - The New World | Action Comics #977–984 | |
| Superman: Action Comics - The Oz Effect | Action Comics #985–992 | |
| Superman: Action Comics Vol. 5 - Booster Shot | Action Comics #993–999, Special #1 | |
| Superman (vol. 4) | | |
| Superman Vol. 1: Son of Superman | Superman: Rebirth #1, Superman (vol. 4) #1–6 | |
| Superman Vol. 2: Trials of the Super Son | Superman (vol. 4) #7–13 | |
| Superman Vol. 3: Multiplicity | Superman (vol. 4) #14–17, Annual (vol. 4) #1 | |
| Superman Vol. 4: Black Dawn | Superman (vol. 4) #20–26 | |
| Superman Vol. 5: Hopes and Fears | Superman (vol. 4) #27–32 | |
| Superman Vol. 6: Imperius Lex | Superman (vol. 4) #33–36, 39–41 | |
| Super Sons of Tomorrow | Super Sons #11–12, Superman (vol. 4) #37–38, Teen Titans (vol. 6) #15 | |
| Superman Vol. 7: Bizarroverse | Superman (vol. 4) #42–45, Special (vol. 3) #1 | |

Deluxe Editions
| Title | Material collected | ISBN |
| Action Comics | | |
|---|---|---|
| Superman: Action Comics – The Rebirth Deluxe Edition - Book 1 | Justice League (vol. 2) #52; Action Comics #957–966 | |
| Superman: Action Comics – The Rebirth Deluxe Edition - Book 2 | Action Comics #967–984 | |
| Superman: Action Comics – The Rebirth Deluxe Edition - Book 3 | Action Comics #985–999, Special #1 | |
| Superman (vol. 4) | | |
| Superman: The Rebirth Deluxe Edition - Book 1 | Superman: Rebirth #1, Superman (vol. 4) #1–13 | |
| Superman: The Rebirth Deluxe Edition - Book 2 | Superman (vol. 4) #14–26, Annual (vol. 4) #1 | |
| Superman: The Rebirth Deluxe Edition - Book 3 | Superman (vol. 4) #27–36 | |
| Superman: The Rebirth Deluxe Edition - Book 4 | Superman (vol. 4) #37–45, Special (vol. 3) #1; Action Comics #1000 | |

=== Post-Rebirth ===
| Title | Material collected | ISBN |
| Action Comics | | |
|---|---|---|
| Action Comics #1000 Deluxe Edition | Action Comics #1, 1000; all of the issue's variant covers | |
| Superman: Action Comics Vol. 1 - Invisible Mafia | Action Comics #1001–1006 | |
| Superman: Action Comics Vol. 2 - Leviathan Rising | Action Comics #1007–1011 | |
| Superman: Action Comics Vol. 3 - Leviathan Hunt | Action Comics #1012–1016 | |
| Superman: Action Comics Vol. 4 - Metropolis Burning | Action Comics #1017–1021 | |
| Superman: Action Comics Vol. 5 - The House of Kent | Action Comics #1022–1028 | |
| Superman: Action Comics Vol. 1 - Warworld Rising | Action Comics #1030–1035 | |
| Superman: Action Comics Vol. 2 - The Arena | Action Comics #1036–1042 | |
| Superman: Action Comics Vol. 3 - Warworld Revolution | Action Comics #1043–1046, 2022 Annual; Superman: Warworld Apocalypse #1 | |
| Superman: Kal-El Returns | Superman: Son of Kal-El #16–18, Action Comics #1047–1050, Superman: Kal-El Returns Special #1 | |
| Superman: Action Comics - Vol. 1: Rise of Metallo | Action Comics #1051–1056 | |
| Superman: Action Comics - Vol. 2: To Hell and Back | Action Comics #1057–1059, 2023 Annual; Action Comics Presents Doomsday Special #1; Knight Terrors: Action Comics #1-2 | |
| Superman (vol. 5) | | |
| Superman Vol. 1: The Unity Saga: Phantom Earth | Superman (vol. 5) #1–6 | |
| Superman Vol. 2: The Unity Saga: The House of El | Superman (vol. 5) #7–15 | |
| Superman Vol. 3: The Truth Revealed | Superman (vol. 5) #16–19, Superman: Heroes #1, Superman: Villains #1 | |
| Superman Vol. 4: Mythological | Superman (vol. 5) #20–28 | |
| Superman: The One Who Fell | Action Comics #1029, Superman (vol. 5) #29–32 | |
| Superman: Son of Kal-El | | |
| Superman: Son of Kal-El - Vol. 1: The Truth | Superman: Son of Kal-El #1–6 | |
| Superman: Son of Kal-El - Vol. 2: The Rising | Superman: Son of Kal-El #7–10, 2021 Annual; Nightwing (vol. 4) #89 | |
| Superman: Son of Kal-El - Vol. 3: Battle for Gamorra | Superman: Son of Kal-El #11–15 | |
| Superman (vol. 6) | | |
| Superman Vol. 1: Supercorp | Superman (vol. 6) #1–5, 2023 Annual | |
| Superman Vol. 2: The Chained | Superman (vol. 6) #6–12 | |
| Superman: House of Brainiac | Superman (vol. 6) #13–15, Action Comics #1064–1066, Superman: House of Brainiac Special #1 | |
| Superman Vol. 3: The Dark Path | Superman (vol. 6) #16–18, Knight Terrors: Superman 1-2 | |

=== Multi-Era Compilations ===
| Title | Material collected | Publication Date | ISBN |
|---|---|---|---|
| Superman from the 30s to the 70s | Various stories from 1938-71 | 1971 | 0517190338 |
| Superman from the 30s to the 80s | Updated edition, various stories from 1938-1980 | 1983 | 0517551004 |
| The Greatest Superman Stories Ever Told | Stories from Superman #4, 13, 30, 53, 123, 125, 129, 132, 145, 149, 162, 247, Annual #11; Action Comics #241; Superboy #68; The Forever People #1; Superman (vol. 2) #2; "What if Superman Ended the War?" from Look magazine (1943). Featuring introductions by John Byrne and Mike Gold. | November 1987 | HC 0-930289-29-3; SC (1989) 0930289-39-0 |
| Superman: The Greatest Stories Ever Told | Stories from Superman #1, 65, 156, 247, 400; Action Comics #775; The Man of Steel #1; Superman (vol. 2) #18; "What if Superman Ended the War?" from Look magazine (1943). Featuring an introduction by Michael Uslan. | August 2004 | 1-4012-0339-6 |
| Superman: The Greatest Stories Ever Told Vol. 2 | Stories from Superman #30, 132, 141, 167, 233, 400; Superman (vol. 2) #2; Adventures of Superman #500, 638 | December 2006 | 1-4012-0956-4 |
| Superman/Batman: The Greatest Stories Ever Told | Stories from Superman #76; World's Finest Comics #142, 159, 176, 207; The Man of Steel #3; Batman and Superman: World's Finest Book 7; Superman/Batman Annual #1; Superman/Batman Secret Files and Origins 2003 | March 2007 | 978-1401212278 |
| Superboy: The Greatest Team-Up Stories Ever Told | Stories from Adventure Comics #216, 253, 271, 280; Superboy #55, 63, 80, 171, 182; The New Adventures of Superboy #13 | January 2010 | 978-1401226527 |
| Superman vs. Brainiac | Action Comics #242, 489, 491, 544, 649, 763; Superman #167; Superman's Girl Friend, Lois Lane #17; Adventures of Superman #438 | 2008 | 1401219403 |
| Superman vs. Lex Luthor | Action Comics #23, 544; Adventure Comics #281; Superboy #86; Superman #90, 164, 292, 416; Superman (vol. 2) #9, 131; Superman: Lex 2000; The Man of Steel #4 | 2006 | 1401209513 |
| Superman: Daily Planet | Action Comics #211, 429, 436, 461; Superman #79, 280; Superman's Girl Friend, Lois Lane #17, 29, 45, 54; Superman's Pal Jimmy Olsen #42, 44, 63, 75, 124 | 2006 | 1401209394 |
| Superman: Past and Future | Action Comics #300, 338, 339; DC Comics Presents Annual #2; Superboy #85; Superman #48, 107, 181, 295, 300; Superman's Girl Friend, Lois Lane #59; Superman's Pal Jimmy Olsen #86; World's Finest Comics #166 | 2008 | 1401219349 |
| Superman: Tales from the Phantom Zone | Action Comics #336; Adventure Comics #283, 300; Superboy #89, 104; Superman #157, 205; Superman's Girl Friend, Lois Lane #33; Superman's Pal Jimmy Olsen #62 | 2009 | 1401222587 |
| Superman: The Bottle City of Kandor | Action Comics #242, 245; Superman #158, 338; Superman's Girl Friend, Lois Lane #21, 76, 78; Superman's Pal Jimmy Olsen #53, 69; The Superman Family #194; World's Finest Comics #143 | 2007 | 1401214657 |
| Superman: The Secrets of the Fortress of Solitude | Action Comics #241, 261, Annual #2, 10; DC Special Series #26; Superman #17; Superman: The Man of Steel #100 | 2012 | 1401234232 |
| Superman: The Many Worlds of Krypton | Superman #233, 236, 238, 240, 248, 257, 266; The Superman Family #182; World of Krypton #1–3; The World of Krypton #1–4 | 2018 | 1401217958 |

== See also ==
- List of Batman comics
- List of Spider-Man titles
- Publication history of Batman
- Publication history of Superman
- Publication history of Wonder Woman
- Spider-Man collected editions
