= Tezcatlipoca (DC Comics) =

Left: the New 52 Tezcatlipoca in Wonder Woman (vol. 5) #53 (August 2018), art by ACO and Hugo Petrus.
Right: Tezcatlipoca (Chama Sierra) pounces in Green Arrow (vol. 2) #102 (November 1995); art by Rodolfo Damaggio.

Tezcatlipoca is a name used by two distinct fictional characters appearing as supervillains in DC Comics publications and related media.

The first Tezcatlipoca is a character based on the eponymous Aztec mythological figure, a powerful deity of conflict, nighttime and sorcery, who commonly appears as a recurring adversary of the superheroes Wonder Woman and Aztek. He debuted as a treacherous ally of Wonder Woman's foe Circe in 1984's Wonder Woman (vol. 1) #314 by writer Dan Mishkin and illustrator Don Heck, and went on to battle Wonder Woman several times as an independent agent. Following the Crisis on Infinite Earths continuity reboot, Tezcatlipoca was re-imagined by creative team Grant Morrison, Mark Millar and N. Steven Harris as an enemy for Uno, the titular hero of their 1996 ongoing series Aztek, the Ultimate Man. In World War III, Tezcatlipoca is revealed to be the planet-destroying machine Mageddon, and Aztek sacrifices himself to defeat him. Tezcatlipoca is returned to his roots as an Aztec god after DC's Rebirth relaunch, battling Nayeli Constant (the second Aztek), Wonder Woman and Artemis in 2018's Wonder Woman (vol. 5) #53-54.

The second Tezcatlipoca, Chama Sierra, is a human who can transform into a humanoid jaguar and believes himself to be the earthly avatar of the eponymous Aztec god. He has commonly appeared as an adversary of the superhero Connor Hawke, debuting in 1995's Green Arrow (vol. 2) #102, by writer Chuck Dixon and illustrator Rodolfo Damaggio.

== Tezcatlipoca (deity) ==
Tezcatlipoca
- Tezcatlipoca on the cover of Wonder Woman (vol. 1) #316 (June 1984); art by Eduardo Barreto.

Publication information
- Publisher: DC Comics
- First appearance: Wonder Woman #314 (April 1984)
- Created by: Dan Mishkin, Don Heck

In-story information
- Abilities: Godlike powers, including magical mirrors revealing inner fears and desires, superhuman strength, enhanced senses, jaguar form, power to hurl lightning, possession of human hosts.

=== Fictional character biography ===
The Aztec god Tezcatlipoca was able to reenter the human world when he found a human host. He became a consort of Circe, aiding and ultimately betraying her as she battled the pre-Crisis Wonder Woman.

Tezcatlipoca, trickster god, was manipulating the U.S. government and its intervention in the affairs of the fictional Central American county Tropidor. Lt. Keith Griggs of Air Force intelligence was sent to investigate possible illegal arms sales from U.S. intelligence officers to Tropidor militants when he crash landed in Circe's hidden jungle lair. Wonder Woman's alter ego, Lt. Diana Prince, was sent to investigate, and waged battle with Circe to free Griggs and the other men enslaved in animal form.

When Circe called upon her unseen lover for aid, a powerful bolt of lightning came down from the sky. Wonder Woman used both her bracelets to deflect the lightning, but they were fused together. As she had just had her bracelets bound by a man, she was rendered powerless until she persuaded Griggs, trapped in the form of a ram/man hybrid, to charge her and use the force of his collision to break the bracelets apart. Wonder Woman deflected more lightning bolts, unwittingly sending the fiery bolts to burn down Circe's patch of immortality-granting herbs. Tezcatlipoca then imprisoned Circe in his obsidian mirror, turned Wonder Woman into a powerless Diana Prince, and revealed himself.

In the ensuing adventure, Wonder Woman discovered a hitherto lost tribe of Amazons under Tezcatlipoca's spell and freed them by releasing an eagle, the symbol of Amazon strength, from a mystical cage. Taunted by the trickster god in a hall of mirrors with various versions of herself, Wonder Woman reclaimed her confidence, smashed his mirror, and reemerged with her powers reclaimed. She sent Tezcatlipoca away by smashing a figurine of the god fused with a man, thus freeing his human host and banishing him to his godly realm, though not before he reminded her that he had already sown the seeds of madness in Tropidor.

When Lt. Griggs and fellow officer Lt. Lauren Haley were sent again to Tropidor a year later, Wonder Woman followed them and rescued them from Tezcatlipoca's clutches, after triumphantly breaking a time loop in which the mad god repeatedly slew Griggs.

Tezcatlipoca does not appear in post-Crisis continuity, but is alluded to as the threat that the Q Society raised Aztek to stop.

=== Powers and abilities ===
Tezcatlipoca wields an array of godlike powers to warp time and reality to his whims.

== Tezcatlipoca (Chama Sierra) ==
Tezcatlipoca
- Tezcatlipoca attacks Connor Hawke on the cover of Green Arrow (vol. 2) #102 (November 1995); art by Rodolfo Damaggio.

Publication information
- Publisher: DC Comics
- First appearance: Green Arrow (vol. 2) #102 (November 1995)
- Created by: Chuck Dixon; Rodolfo Damaggio

In-story information
- Alter ego: Chama Sierra
- Abilities: Cat-like speed and agility, superhuman strength and enhanced senses, and retractable claws.

=== Fictional character biography ===
During the Underworld Unleashed storyline, Chama Sierra makes a deal with the demon Neron for power in exchange for his soul. Neron gives Chama the powers and form of a jaguar, and Chama believes himself to be the Aztec jaguar god Tezcatlipoca. He battles Connor Hawke, the second Green Arrow, and manages to escape from him.

Tezcatlipoca later meets the villainess Panara, a humanoid leopard who he views as a kindred spirit. The two fall in love and become partners in crime until Tezcatlipoca is exposed to Joker's laughing gas, which drives him insane. Tezcatlipoca and Panara embark on a killing spree until they are stopped by Robin and Blue Beetle and sent to prison.

=== Powers and abilities ===
Tezcatlipoca has all of the natural abilities of a jaguar. His strength, speed, and agility have been mystically enhanced beyond human levels. He also has retractable claws and night vision. He is prone to bouts of bestial rage, and has been known to attack and eat other humans.

== See also ==
- List of Wonder Woman enemies
