= Superman vs. Predator =

- Cover of Superman vs. Predator

Publication information
- Publisher: DC Comics
- Publication date: 2000

Creative team
- Written by: David Michelinie and Alex Maleev

Superman vs. Predator is an intercompany crossover pitting DC Comics superhero Superman against the Predator creature from the Predator film series. It is the second collaboration between DC and Dark Horse Books using the characters of the DC Universe and the Predator franchise, following Batman vs. Predator, and was followed by Batman Versus Predator II: Bloodmatch and Batman Versus Predator III: Blood Ties.

== History ==
In the time leading up to the Superman vs. Predator crossover, companies DC Comics and Dark Horse Comics had already established a healthy partnership, beginning with their first joint comic book series, 1991's Batman Versus Predator. This crossover was shortly followed by DC Comics pitting Superman against Dark Horse Comics characters Aliens, the same species from the science-fiction film series. The plan from both companies was to eventually have Superman and The Predator fight each other, which came to fruition in the year 2000.

== Plot ==
A S.T.A.R. Labs expedition uncovers an ancient derelict spacecraft in the jungles of Central America. Superman investigates the ship and is afflicted by an alien virus causing his powers to fluctuate wildly. The group is captured by a band of mercenaries working for a clandestine scientist. He plans to use the alien technology to facilitate selective global genocide based on genetic sequencing, but is unaware of the arrival of the hunter from the galaxy known as the Predator. The latter considers Superman as a worthy opponent and begins stalking him while concurrently seeking to reclaim the stolen technology appropriated by the scientist. It's a race against time for Superman to save countless millions of lives.

== Collected editions ==
The series has been collected as a trade paperback:

- Superman vs. Predator (by David Michelinie and Alex Maleev, DC Comics, 3-issue mini-series, 2000, tpb, 2001, ISBN 1-56389-732-6)

== Other crossovers ==
Since the character of The Predator clashed with Superman, the alien hunter experienced other comic book crossovers. This included fighting the JLA in JLA versus Predator and when he shared the spotlight with the Aliens against the World's Finest in Superman and Batman versus Aliens and Predator.

== See also ==
- Batman Versus Predator
- Superman/Aliens
- Superman and Batman versus Aliens and Predator
- Superman/Batman
- Aliens Versus Predator
- Batman/Aliens
- Batman: Dead End
