= Superman vs. The Terminator: Death to the Future =

Comic book

Superman versus The Terminator: Death to the Future
- Cover of Superman versus The Terminator: Death to the Future #1 (December 1999).

Publication information
- Publisher: Dark Horse Comics DC Comics
- Schedule: Monthly
- Format: Limited series
- Genre: Superhero fiction Science fantasy
- Publication date: December 1999 - March 2000
- No. of issues: 4
- Main character(s): Superman; Terminator

Creative team
- Written by: Alan Grant
- Penciller: Steve Pugh
- Inker: Mike Perkins
- Letterer: Clem Robins
- Colorist: Dave Stewart

Collected editions
- Superman versus The Terminator: Death to the Future: ISBN 1-56971-476-2

Superman versus The Terminator: Death to the Future is a 2000 four-part comic book crossover written by Alan Grant, with pencils by Steve Pugh and inks by Mike Perkins.

It was published by DC Comics and Dark Horse Comics as an out-of-continuity battle between DC's superhero Superman and the Terminators from James Cameron's popular films.

== Plot ==
In the present day of 1999, Sarah Connor and John Connor, who have been fleeing from time-traveling Terminators for years, come upon the city of Metropolis. Skynet has taken control of the world in 2032, and hopes to kill the young John by sending Terminators to the present.

While walking in a Metropolis shopping mall, Sarah and John are attacked by a T-800 Terminator that emerges from a time portal and immediately begins destroying everything in sight. Superman spots the destruction while patrolling the city, and manages to subdue the killer robot. Eventually, Superman discovers that John is destined to lead a resistance against Skynet and has thus been made the target of attempted assassinations by Terminator cyborgs.

Superman is taken through a time portal to the future world of 2032, where he meets an aged Steel, one of the few heroes to survive Skynet's takeover, and John Connor; the Resistance was attempting to retrieve the previously-dispatched Terminators and accidentally drew Superman into the future instead. Having recovered a version of his costume Steel kept as a memento, Superman promises to aid the two men in bringing down Skynet. Meanwhile, back in 1999, Lois Lane, Sarah Connor, Supergirl, and Superboy fight off a continual wave of Terminators, each one upgraded to a level that allows them to challenge Supergirl and Superboy.

The robotic villain Cyborg Superman makes an appearance, forming an alliance with a female Terminator named "Terminatrix" after leaving information in a Terminator skull that would allow Skynet access to knowledge about how to defeat Superman, and Lex Luthor makes an appearance, where he reveals that he had invested and supported Skynet back in 1999, and believes that he shall be in charge of Skynet if it is activated. The story concludes with Superman's return to the present after helping the Resistance detonate an EMP to shut down Skynet, following it up by annihilating the remaining Terminators in the present.

== Collected editions ==
The series has been collected as a trade paperback:

- Superman versus The Terminator: Death to the Future (96 pages, Titan Books, January 2001, ISBN 1-84023-237-4, Dark Horse Comics, November 2000, ISBN 1-56971-476-2)

== See also ==
- Superman/Aliens
- Superman vs. Predator
