= SBAP =

Sbap or SBAP may refer to:

- Superman and Batman versus Aliens and Predator
- SBAP (Soviet Air Forces), high-speed bomber regiments of the Soviet Air Forces
- Sovereign Base Areas Police, Cyprus
- Provinces of Siena, Grosseto and Arezzo Superintendent for Archaeology, Fine Arts and Landscape, (Soprintendenza Belle Arti e Paesaggio)
