= Damion Poitier =

American actor and stuntman

- Born: June 4, 1976 (age 50); Philadelphia, Pennsylvania, U.S.
- Occupations: Actor, stuntman
- Years active: 2000–present

Damion Poitier (/ˈpwɑːtieɪ/ PWAH-tee-ay; born June 4, 1976) is an American actor and stuntman, best known for his role as Chains in Payday 2. He made an uncredited appearance as Thanos in The Avengers (2012), the character's first appearance in the Marvel Cinematic Universe (in future appearances, Josh Brolin would take over the role). He has also had roles in Captain America: Civil War, Star Trek, Jarhead, and Never Die Alone.

== Early life ==
Poitier was born in Philadelphia, and moved to Massachusetts in his early childhood. He became interested in acting after watching a man who looked "just like [his] grandfather" appear on television talk about acting. He acted through school, but got his first "professional" job as a scare actor at Spooky World. Poitier's first real acting job was a stunt performer on Sheena.

== Personal life ==
Poitier practices Universalism. He is unsure if he is related to Sidney Poitier, but knows that their ancestors "hail from the same island".

== Filmography ==
=== Films ===
| Year | Title | Role | Note |
|---|---|---|---|
| 2003 | Malibu's Most Wanted | Tec's Crew | |
| 2004 | Never Die Alone | Alvin | |
| 2005 | Jarhead | Poitier | |
| 2006 | Dreamgirls | Man in D.C. Bar | Uncredited |
| 2008 | How 2 Build a Rapper | Patron 1 | |
| 2008 | Toxic | Angel's Thug #1 | |
| 2009 | Star Trek | Drill Hanson #1 | Uncredited |
| 2009 | Black Dynamite | Thug #2 | |
| 2009 | The Perfect Sleep | Ganyov | |
| 2010 | Hunter Prey | Centauri 7 | |
| 2012 | The 404 | | |
| 2012 | The Avengers | Thanos | Credited as Man #1; post-credits scene |
| 2013 | Almost Broadway | Joe | |
| 2013 | The Hangover Part III | Henchman #6 | Uncredited |
| 2013 | Bolden! | Fighter #6 | |
| 2014 | Mercenaries | Webber | |
| 2015 | Smosh: The Movie | Super Boring Man | |
| 2016 | Captain America: Civil War | Crossbones' mercenary | Credited as Hero Merc #1 |

=== Short films ===
| Year | Title | Role | Note |
|---|---|---|---|
| 2004 | World's Finest | Secret Serviceman | As Damion Pointier |
| 2007 | Ultimate Weapon | Bouncer | |
| 2009 | Bad Roommate | Dave | |
| 2010 | The Response | Aldo | |
| 2011 | Superseven: Operation Breakdown | Mamba | |
| 2012 | When the Cobra Strikes | Modise | Video |

=== Television ===
| Year | Title | Role | Note |
|---|---|---|---|
| 2000–2001 | Sheena | Non-Speaking Somali / Ranger #2 | |
| 2002 | Firefly | Henchman | |
| 2003 | The Practice | Marcus Thayer / Willie Brand | |
| 2003 | Charmed | Bachelor #4 / Magi Warrior | |
| 2003 | Alias | Mp #4 | |
| 2003 | Metropolis | Banger #3 / Hazing Leader | |
| 2004–2005 | Judging Amy | Bad guy / Thug | |
| 2008 | Street Warrior | Huge Thug | TV film |
| 2009 | CSI: New York | Thug #1 | |
| 2009–2010 | Dollhouse | Yankee | |
| 2011 | The Zombie Whisperer | Zombie Puncher | |
| 2011 | Parks and Recreation | Gregory Gaines | |
| 2011 | Sons of Anarchy | Luther | Episode: "Dorylus" |
| 2011 | Witchy Ways | Dagara | |
| 2011 | Adventures of Superseven | Mamba | |
| 2011 | True Blood | Duprez | |
| 2012 | Awake | Officer Pike | |
| 2012 | Divergence | Tyler | |
| 2013 | Pair of Kings | Kaita | Episodes: "Long Live the Kings" part 1 and 2 |
| 2015 | Mighty Med | The Incapacitator | Episode: "Lab Rats vs. Mighty Med" |
| 2015 | Lab Rats | The Incapacitator | Episode: "Lab Rats vs. Mighty Med" |
| 2018 | Ninjak vs. the Valiant Universe | Jack Boniface / Shadowman | |
| 2019–2023 | The Flash | Goldface / Keith Kenyon | 6 episodes |

=== Video games ===
| Year | Title | Role | Note |
|---|---|---|---|
| 2013 | Payday 2: The Web Series | Chains | Live-action promotional material for the game |
| 2013 | Payday 2 | Chains | |
| 2014 | Halo 2 Anniversary | Sergeant Major Avery Johnson / The Arbiter | Motion capture |
| 2017 | Halo Wars 2 | Atriox | Motion capture |
| 2020 | Deadly Premonition 2: A Blessing in Disguise | Xavier Johnson | |
| 2023 | Crime Boss: Rockay City | Nasara | |
| 2023 | Payday 3 | Chains | Voice |
