= Sandy Collora =

American film director and design artist

- Occupation: Director
- Notable work: Batman: Dead End

Sandy Collora (born August 8, 1968) is an American film director and design artist, best known for the independent short film Batman: Dead End.

== Career ==
Collora was born in Brooklyn, New York. After freelance assignments in comic books and gaming magazines, he moved to Los Angeles to pursue his dreams in Hollywood at age 17. In 1988, after Collora landed a job at Stan Winston Studios on Leviathan, he became known as a creature designer and sculptor. Collora spent the next decade in concept design, sculpting, storyboarding, and art direction. He claims to have designed the logo for Jurassic Park, and his designs can be seen in Men in Black, Dogma, The Arrival, The Crow, and Predator 2.

He made his directorial debut in 1999 with the short film Solomon Bernstein's Bathroom. 1999 also saw the birth of his toy development studio and independent production company Montauk Films. Collora attracted attention with his 2003 short film Batman: Dead End, intended to act as a director's demonstration reel. After premiering the film at San Diego Comic-Con, it became popular on the Internet, and was downloaded more than 600,000 times in the first week. Director Kevin Smith called it "possibly the truest, best Batman movie ever made". Collora filmed a similar project, 2004's World's Finest, with much of the same cast and crew. In 2010, Collora released his first feature film, Hunter Prey.

In 2015 Collora stated that he was working on a new film entitled Shallow Water and was seeking to raise $550,000 via Kickstarter, making it the largest campaign of its type in the horror category.

== Filmography ==
Director:

- Solomon Bernstein's Bathroom (2000)
- Archangel (2002)
- Batman: Dead End (2003)
- World's Finest (2004)
- Hunter Prey (2010)
- Shallow Water (2017)
- The Delray Misunderstood: The Legend of Big Lenny (2018)
