= Aztek (character) =

Name of two DC comics superheroes

Publication information
- Publisher: DC Comics
- First appearance: Uno: Aztek: The Ultimate Man #1 (August 1996); Constant: Justice League of America vol. 5 #20 (December 2017)
- Created by: Uno: N. Steven Harris; Mark Millar; Grant Morrison; Constant: Steve Orlando; Ivan Reis

In-story information
- Alter ego: Uno/Dr. Curtis "Curt" Falconer; Nayeli Constant
- Team affiliations: Uno: Justice League; Q Society; Constant: Q Society; Justice League of America II; Justice Foundation
- Abilities: Manipulates four-dimensional energy for: Superhuman strength, speed, and hearing; X-ray vision; Flight; Invisibility; Plasma blasts; Body heat camouflage; Density shifting; Entrapment net generation

Aztek is the name of two superheroes appearing in DC Comics. Both versions are based in the fictional Vanity City and are champions of the Aztec god Quetzalcoatl. The first Aztek first appeared in Aztek: The Ultimate Man #1 in August 1996, and he was created by Grant Morrison, Mark Millar, and N. Steven Harris. Following the short-run series, Aztek appeared in several issues of JLA also written by Morrison. The second Aztek, a female version created by Steve Orlando and Ivan Reis, appeared in Justice League of America vol. 5 #20, in December 2017, as the rival and later partner of the Ray.

== Fictional character biography ==
=== Uno ===
Uno is raised from childhood by a secret organization named the Q Society to be the champion of Quetzalcoatl and battle their enemy, the deity Tezcatlipoca. He is given a magical suit of armor that bestows many abilities and augmenting his strength. After his training is completed, he enters the United States and assumes the identity of recently deceased physician Curt Falconer.

Aztek later joins the Justice League, but resigns after learning that Lex Luthor is a benefactor of the Q Society. He is blinded while battling the planet-destroying machine Mageddon, who is revealed to be Tezcatlipoca. During the World War III storyline, Aztek sacrifices himself to help Superman destroy Mageddon/Tezcatlipoca.

=== Nayeli Constant ===
A new version of the character, Nayeli Constant, debuted in Justice League of America vol. 5 #20. She is a software engineer in Austin, Texas who is recruited by Aztek's helmet to succeed Uno following his death. Constant modifies the helmet and armor to suit her needs. After traveling to the city of Vanity, Constant comes into conflict with the Ray, as they both seek to protect Vanity. The two later decide to work together.

== Powers and abilities ==
Aztek has peak human physical and mental conditioning. He wears an ancient helmet and armor powered by a "four-dimensional mirror", from which he derives flight, infrared and X-ray vision, invisibility, intangibility, camouflage, entrapment nets, plasma beams and density manipulation, as well as augmenting his peak physical abilities to superhuman levels. The helmet could feed information directly into his brain even after he was blinded in his first confrontation with Mageddon. The four-dimensional power can could self-destruct in a highly explosive manner.

== Other versions ==
An alternate timeline version of Aztek known as Azteka appears in the "Rock of Ages" storyline.

== In other media ==
- Aztek appears in Justice League Unlimited, voiced by Chris Cox in "Question Authority" and Corey Burton in "I Am Legion". This version is a member of the Justice League.
- Aztek appears as a character summon in Scribblenauts Unmasked: A DC Comics Adventure.

== Bibliography ==
The original run has been collected as a trade paperback: JLA Presents: Aztek: The Ultimate Man (by co-authors Grant Morrison and Mark Millar, pencils by N. Steven Harris, and inks by Keith Champagne, 1996; collects Aztek: The Ultimate Man #1–10, 240 pages, April 2008, ISBN 1-4012-1688-9).

Aztek also appeared in several issues of Morrison's JLA (5, 10–12, 15, 36, 38–41), as well as the final two issues of Mark Millar's JLA: Paradise Lost and his fill-in issue for JLA (27).

He has profile entries in JLA Secret Files and Origins #1 and The DC Comics Encyclopedia.
