= Batman Versus Predator =

1991 comic book

- Cover of the Batman Versus Predator trade paperback collected edition (1993). Art by Dave Gibbons.
- Publisher: DC Comics and Dark Horse Comics

Batman Versus Predator

Series publication information
- Schedule: Monthly
- Format: Limited series
- Publication date: (vol. 1); December 1991 – February 1992 (vol. 2); December 1993 – March 1994 (vol. 3); November 1997 – February 1998
- Number of issues: (vol. 1): 3 (vol. 2): 4 (vol. 3): 4
- Main character(s): Batman; Predators; Jim Gordon; Helena Bertinelli/Huntress; Tim Drake/Robin

Creative team
- Writer(s): List: Dave Gibbons (vol.1) Doug Moench (vol. 2) Chuck Dixon (vol. 3)
- Penciller(s): List: Andy Kubert (vol. 1) Paul Gulacy (vol.2) Rodolfo Damaggio (vol. 3)
- Inker(s): List: Adam Kubert (vol. 1) Terry Austin (vol. 2) Robert Campanella (vol. 3)
- Colorist(s): List: Sherilyn van Valkenburgh (vol. 1) Carla Feeny, Lovern Kinzierski, and Digital Chameleon (vol. 2) Pat Garrahy and Lee Lougridge (vol. 3)
- Editor(s): List: Denny O'Neil Jenette Kahn Kelley Puckett Randy Stradley Diana Schutz Scott Peterson Mike Carlin Darren J. Vincenzo Michael Eury Marilee Hord

Collected editions
- Batman Versus Predator: ISBN 1-56389-092-5
- Bloodmatch: ISBN 1563892219
- Blood Ties: ISBN 1852869135

Batman Versus Predator is a comic book crossover featuring a duel between Batman and members of the titular extraterrestrial race from the Predator film franchise. It was written by Dave Gibbons with art by Andy and Adam Kubert, and was published by DC Comics and Dark Horse Comics in 1991. Adam Kubert won an Eisner Award in 1992 for his contribution.

In 1995, a sequel was published called Batman Versus Predator II: Bloodmatch. It was written by Doug Moench, with art by Paul Gulacy and Terry Austin. A third series, Batman Versus Predator III: Blood Ties, was published in 1997. Written by Chuck Dixon with art by Rodolfo Damaggio and Robert Campanella, it also features Mr. Freeze and a Catwoman cameo.

== Summary ==
=== Batman Versus Predator ===
The first book opens with a boxing match in Gotham City. Each of the fighters is backed by two of the city's biggest gangsters, Alex Yeager and Leo Brodin. When Yeager's victorious fighter is killed in his apartment shortly after the bout, Batman is called in to help investigate the crime. Though suspicion falls on Brodin, the grisly yet unusual murder (consisting of spine and skull removal) suggests otherwise. Batman's main goal initially is to avoid a battle on the streets of Gotham between the two mob bosses – the subsequent death of Brodin's losing boxer only making matters more complicated.

In an attempt to defuse the conflict, Yeager's partner, "legitimate" but corrupt businessman Raymond Squires, arranges a meeting between the two crime lords during which Yeager is murdered by an invisible intruder. Clues lead Batman to the killer's hideout in an abandoned scrapyard, but in a deadly duel, he comes close to losing his life to the Predator, who escapes. Batman retreats to Wayne Manor, where his butler Alfred Pennyworth treats his injuries. Bedridden and encased in an orthopedic cast, he begins the slow process of recovery and to plan for another match with the Predator.

Over the next few days, and in the absence of the Dark Knight, the Predator targets Squires, Brodin, and Gotham City Mayor Lieberman in a series of calculated assaults. Commissioner Jim Gordon himself is almost killed in his own home by the hunter, but escapes thanks to the sacrifice of another officer. Batman attempts to recover quickly, knowing the death toll rises every day. A countdown is initiated by the National Guard and SWAT teams: if Batman does not emerge before the end of the countdown, they plan to flush the Predator out of hiding by searching street-by-street, a tactic that will likely take more lives than would be saved.

Batman, nowhere near healed yet just able to walk, uses a custom-designed powered sonar exoskeleton suit to increase his strength, compensate for his recovering blindness, and counter the Predator's stealth technology. The battle begins on the roof of the Gotham City Police Department (GCPD), continues in the Batcave after a chase on the Batmobile, and ends on the outskirts of Wayne Manor. After the Predator sustains several injuries, including being hit with a wide-spectrum tranquilizer by Batman and shot with an old blunderbuss by Alfred, Batman finally knocks it down with a wooden baseball bat as its ship lands; others of its kind disembark. The defeated Predator commits honor suicide with a sword, which the Predator commander presents to Batman before leaving. Batman is confident that the Predators will not return after having met Gotham's inhabitants.

=== Batman Versus Predator II: Bloodmatch ===
The story opens as Gotham City experiences a severe heat wave. Batman – unwillingly aided by Huntress (Helena Bertinelli) – successfully apprehends a criminal during a drug-related homicide. The criminal reveals that his boss, a drug lord named Terraro, has put a price on Batman's head and hired seven of the world's best professional assassins to hunt him. Shortly after the capture, a strange, luminous object (reported to be a meteorite) lands beyond the Gotham River.

Another Predator begins its hunt. The creature kills one of the assassins on a rooftop, knocks out Huntress (but spares her, having mistaken her for Batman), kills several of Terraro's associates, and attacks the GCPD before retreating with the Bat-Signal. Batman investigates the murder scene, determining it to be another Predator attack, before following the signal's direction beyond the city limits. He is ambushed by the creature, only to be saved by the timely arrival of the Huntress. Another one of Terraro's assassins is eliminated by the Predator when he tries to steal the kill during the fight.

Now informed of the creature's identity, the Huntress follows leads on Terraro, avoiding two of his assassins that kill each other accidentally. She also seeks to defeat the Predator as a challenge, despite knowing that she will become a target herself. Instead of donning his exoskeleton, Batman develops a gauntlet to generate an electromagnetic pulse which can nullify the creature's stealth technology. The FBI arrive, revealing plans to set up a specialized strike force to kill the creature quickly. Batman and the Huntress both confront Terraro, but all are attacked by the Predator, and Terraro is murdered in his own loft. Another of Terraro's assassins is apprehended afterward. Batman tracks the alien, only to discover the corpse of a different Predator. When another alien retrieves his fallen comrade in plain sight of him, Batman deduces that these two are not tracking him, but rather the Predator rampaging through Gotham, who seems to have no qualms in killing members of its own species.

After disabling one of Terraro's two remaining assassins, Batman regroups with Commissioner Gordon, now aided by the FBI. They plan to use the Bat-Signal to lure the creature into the open, where they can assault it. The attempt fails: both federal agents are killed, a non-threatening Predator is mistaken for the real killer and is injured, and team member Lieutenant Stocker is captured by the true killer and taken hostage. Batman and the Huntress track it back to the ship, followed by the last of Terraro's assassins, who is also murdered by the beast. It overpowers the both of them, but Lt. Stocker sacrifices his life, impaling the Predator with its own spear, though the creature lives long enough to activate the ship's engines. As Batman and the Huntress escape the fleeing vessel, another ship appears and follows, opening fire on the vessel and destroying both ships. The book ends with the Bat-Signal lighting up again, signaling trouble from The Joker, a relative relief to the other-worldly troubles.

=== Batman Versus Predator III: Blood Ties ===
Gotham City, suffering yet again from sweltering temperatures and increased gang warfare, experiences more mysterious deaths. Aided now by his protégé, Robin (Tim Drake), Batman worries that this may be yet another series of hunts by the brutal Predator aliens, yet refuses to disclose this to his partner, irking Robin. Indeed, not one, but two beasts are prowling in Gotham: an elder creature who seems to tell stories of previous hunts to his younger partner.

Gotham's criminal population remains unaware of the alien visitors, until Mr. Freeze and his associates are attacked by the two cloaked Predators. Though all of his nearby henchmen are killed, Mr. Freeze is left alive, as his lowered body temperature makes him invisible to the Predators' infrared vision. Despite Robin's questions about the bizarre attacks, Batman does not reveal anything more than what Robin has already overheard, though he agrees to let Robin aid him until Mr. Freeze is found. Batman later confides to Alfred that his reticence with Robin is out of a desire to keep the boy from becoming a target of the Predators.

Batman attacks one of the aliens with an advanced helicopter prototype from Wayne Technologies, inadvertently saving Catwoman's life in the process. He also discovers the second Predator, safely ejecting from his helicopter as the vehicle is destroyed in the process. Meanwhile, at the advice of Oracle (Barbara Gordon), Robin learns details of previous "hunts" through computer research in confidential government files. He also successfully tracks down Mr. Freeze and subdues him. When questioned, Mr. Freeze reveals the creatures did not seem to have even seen him.

With Mr. Freeze now in custody, Batman orders Robin to lie low, further aggravating the youth. In an effort to defeat the beasts, Bruce manipulates WayneTech into closing down for 24 hours to provide a battleground he can control. He dons a modified powered exoskeleton prototype based on the one he used in his first encounter to mask his body temperature, to exploit the Predators' thermal-based vision, and suspects that they are cold-blooded that makes them vulnerable to frigid temperature. The plan works, but only lures one of the two aliens. Responding to Batman's confusion, and using Tim Drake's voice, the Predator indicates that it is now tracking Robin at a drive-in theater with friends, where he is watching old science-fiction films. Batman then ensnares the elder Predator with Mr. Freeze's absolute zero cannon.

Alfred contacts Robin, who immediately accepts the truth and returns to the Batcave when he sees the creature's silhouette. The butler explains what little they know of their assailants before they are attacked. The two are nearly caught, but Batman returns, carrying one of the elder Predator's ornaments and telling the younger hunter to cut his losses, take his defeated but living father, and return home. When questioned, Batman reveals that he and Robin were targeted because the Predators saw them as they themselves were: father and son warriors.

== Collected editions ==
The series have been collected into trade paperbacks. DC Comics reprinted all three stories into one trade paperback in June 2017.

#	Title	Publisher	Year	ISBN	Reprints
	Batman Versus Predator	DC Comics / Dark Horse Comics	1993	ISBN 1563890925	Collects The reprinted material is, in whole or in part, from: Batman Versus Predator #1-3
	Credits and full notes: Writer(s) / Dave Gibbons; Penciller(s) / Andy Kubert; The original series was published jointly by DC Comics and Dark Horse Comics.				Collects The reprinted material is, in whole or in part, from: Batman Versus Predator #1-3
	Batman Versus Predator II: Bloodmatch	DC Comics / Dark Horse Comics	1995	ISBN 1563892219	Collects The reprinted material is, in whole or in part, from: Batman Versus Predator II: Bloodmatch #1-4
	Credits and full notes: Writer(s) / Doug Moench; Penciller(s) / Paul Gulacy; The original series was published jointly by DC Comics and Dark Horse Comics.				Collects The reprinted material is, in whole or in part, from: Batman Versus Predator II: Bloodmatch #1-4
	Batman Versus Predator III: Blood Ties	DC Comics / Dark Horse Comics	1998	ISBN 1852869135	Collects The reprinted material is, in whole or in part, from: Batman Versus Predator III: Blood Ties #1-4
	Credits and full notes: Writer(s) / Chuck Dixon; Penciller(s) / Rodolfo Damaggio; The original series was published jointly by DC Comics and Dark Horse Comics. A British edition was published by Titan Books, also in 1998 (ISBN 1-56389-418-1).				Collects The reprinted material is, in whole or in part, from: Batman Versus Predator III: Blood Ties #1-4
	DC Comics/Dark Horse Comics: Batman Versus Predator	DC Comics / Dark Horse Comics	2017-06-07	ISBN 1-4012-7078-6	Collects The reprinted material is, in whole or in part, from: Batman Versus Predator #1-3; Batman Versus Predator II: Bloodmatch #1-4; Batman Versus Predator III: Blood Ties #1-4
	Credits and full notes: Writer(s) / Chuck Dixon, Doug Moench, Dave Gibbons; Penciller(s) / Andy Kubert, Paul Gulacy, Rodolfo Damaggio; ISBN-13 code: 978-1-4012-7078-0				Collects The reprinted material is, in whole or in part, from: Batman Versus Predator #1-3; Batman Versus Predator II: Bloodmatch #1-4; Batman Versus Predator III: Blood Ties #1-4

== Reception ==
Andy Butcher reviewed Bloodmatch: Batman versus Predator for Arcane magazine, rating it a 5 out of 10 overall, and called it another collection of "old" ideas.

== See also ==
- Batman: Dead End, a fan film where Batman fights groups of both Predators and Aliens.
- Superman and Batman versus Aliens and Predator
