= Publication history of Batman =

Batman is a superhero created by Bob Kane and Bill Finger, prominently featured in American comic books published by DC Comics. The character made his debut in Detective Comics #27 in May 1939 and has since become an iconic figure in the superhero genre.

== Creation ==
First published image of Batman, in Action Comics #12, announcing the character's debut in the forthcoming Detective Comics #27

In early 1939, the success of Superman in Action Comics prompted editors at National Comics Publications (the future DC Comics) to request more superheroes for its titles. In response, Bob Kane created "the Bat-Man". Collaborator Bill Finger recalled that "Kane had an idea for a character called 'Batman,' and he'd like me to see the drawings. I went over to Kane's, and he had drawn a character who looked very much like Superman with kind of ...reddish tights, I believe, with boots ...no gloves, no gauntlets ...with a small domino mask, swinging on a rope. He had two stiff wings that were sticking out, looking like bat wings. And under it was a big sign ...BATMAN". According to Kane, the bat-wing-like cape was inspired by his childhood recollection of Leonardo da Vinci's sketch of an ornithopter flying device.

Finger suggested giving the character a cowl instead of a simple domino mask, a cape instead of wings, and gloves; he also recommended removing the red sections from the original costume. Finger said he devised the name Bruce Wayne for the character's secret identity: "Bruce Wayne's first name came from Robert the Bruce, the Scottish patriot. Wayne, being a playboy, was a man of gentry. I searched for a name that would suggest colonialism. I tried Adams, Hancock ...then I thought of Mad Anthony Wayne." He later said his suggestions were influenced by Lee Falk's popular The Phantom, a syndicated newspaper comic-strip character with which Kane was also familiar.

Kane and Finger drew upon contemporary 1930s popular culture for inspiration regarding much of the Bat-Man's look, personality, methods, and weaponry. Details find predecessors in pulp fiction, comic strips, newspaper headlines, and autobiographical details referring to Kane himself. As an aristocratic hero with a double identity, Batman has predecessors in the Scarlet Pimpernel (created by Baroness Emmuska Orczy, 1903) and Zorro (created by Johnston McCulley, 1919). Like them, Batman performs his heroic deeds in secret, averts suspicion by playing aloof in public, and marks his work with a signature symbol. Kane noted the influence of the films The Mark of Zorro (1920) and The Bat Whispers (1930) in the creation of the character's iconography. Finger, drawing inspiration from pulp heroes like Doc Savage, The Shadow, Dick Tracy, and Sherlock Holmes, made the character a master sleuth.

In his 1989 autobiography, Kane detailed Finger's contributions to Batman's creation:

One day I called Bill and said, 'I have a new character called the Bat-Man and I've made some crude, elementary sketches I'd like you to look at.' He came over and I showed him the drawings. At the time, I only had a small domino mask, like the one Robin later wore, on Batman's face. Bill said, 'Why not make him look more like a bat and put a hood on him, and take the eyeballs out and just put slits for eyes to make him look more mysterious?' At this point, the Bat-Man wore a red union suit; the wings, trunks, and mask were black. I thought that red and black would be a good combination. Bill said that the costume was too bright: 'Color it dark grey to make it look more ominous.' The cape looked like two stiff bat wings attached to his arms. As Bill and I talked, we realized that these wings would get cumbersome when Bat-Man was in action and changed them into a cape, scalloped to look like bat wings when he was fighting or swinging down on a rope. Also, he didn't have any gloves on, and we added them so that he wouldn't leave fingerprints.

=== Subsequent creation credit ===
Kane signed away ownership in the character in exchange for, among other compensation, a mandatory byline on all Batman comics. This byline did not originally say "Batman created by Bob Kane"; his name was simply written on the title page of each story. The name disappeared from the comic book in the mid-1960s, replaced by credits for each story's actual writer and artists. In the late 1970s, when Jerry Siegel and Joe Shuster began receiving a "created by" credit on the Superman titles, along with William Moulton Marston being given the byline for creating Wonder Woman, Batman stories began saying "Created by Bob Kane" in addition to the other credits.

Finger did not receive the same recognition. While he had received credit for other DC work since the 1940s, he began, in the 1960s, to receive limited acknowledgment for his Batman writing; in the letters page of Batman #169 (February 1965) for example, editor Julius Schwartz names him as the creator of the Riddler, one of Batman's recurring villains. However, Finger's contract left him only with his writing page rate and no byline. Kane wrote, "Bill was disheartened by the lack of major accomplishments in his career. He felt that he had not used his creative potential to its fullest and that success had passed him by." At the time of Finger's death in 1974, DC had not officially credited Finger as Batman co-creator.

Jerry Robinson, who also worked with Finger and Kane on the strip at this time, has criticized Kane for failing to share the credit. He recalled Finger resenting his position, stating in a 2005 interview with The Comics Journal:

Bob made him more insecure, because while he slaved working on Batman, he wasn't sharing in any of the glory or the money that Bob began to make, which is why ...[he was] going to leave [Kane's employ]. ...[Kane] should have credited Bill as co-creator, because I know; I was there. ...That was one thing I would never forgive Bob for, was not to take care of Bill or recognize his vital role in the creation of Batman. As with Siegel and Shuster, it should have been the same, the same co-creator credit in the strip, writer, and artist.

Although Kane initially rebutted Finger's claims at having created the character, writing in a 1965 open letter to fans that "it seemed to me that Bill Finger has given out the impression that he and not myself created the ''Batman, t' [sic] as well as Robin and all the other leading villains and characters. This statement is fraudulent and entirely untrue." Kane himself also commented on Finger's lack of credit. "The trouble with being a 'ghost' writer or artist is that you must remain rather anonymously without 'credit'. However, if one wants the 'credit', then one has to cease being a 'ghost' or follower and become a leader or innovator."

In 1989, Kane revisited Finger's situation, recalling in an interview:

In those days it was like, one artist and he had his name over it [the comic strip] — the policy of DC in the comic books was, if you can't write it, obtain other writers, but their names would never appear on the comic book in the finished version. So Bill never asked me for it [the byline] and I never volunteered — I guess my ego at that time. And I felt badly, really, when he [Finger] died.

In September 2015, DC Entertainment revealed that Finger would be receiving credit for his role in Batman's creation on the 2016 superhero film Batman v Superman: Dawn of Justice and the second season of Gotham after a deal was worked out between the Finger family and DC. Finger received credit as a creator of Batman for the first time in a comic in October 2015 with Batman and Robin Eternal #3 and Batman: Arkham Knight Genesis #3. The updated acknowledgment for the character appeared as "Batman created by Bob Kane with Bill Finger".

== Golden Age ==
Batman made his debut in Detective Comics #27 (cover dated May 1939), cover art by Bob Kane

The first Batman story, "The Case of the Chemical Syndicate", was published in Detective Comics #27 (cover dated May 1939). It largely duplicated the plot of the story "Partners of Peril" in The Shadow #113, which was written by Theodore Tinsley and illustrated by Tom Lovell. Finger said, "Batman was originally written in the style of the pulps", and this influence was evident with Batman showing little remorse over killing or maiming criminals. Batman proved a hit character, and he received his own solo title in 1940 while continuing to star in Detective Comics. By that time, Detective Comics was the top-selling and most influential publisher in the industry; Batman and the company's other major hero, Superman, were the cornerstones of the company's success. The two characters were featured side by side as the stars of World's Finest Comics, which was originally titled World's Best Comics when it debuted in fall 1940. Creators including Jerry Robinson and Dick Sprang also worked on the strips during this period.

Over the course of the first few Batman strips elements were added to the character and the artistic depiction of Batman evolved. Kane noted that within six issues he drew the character's jawline more pronounced, and lengthened the ears on the costume. "About a year later he was almost the full figure, my mature Batman", Kane said. Batman's characteristic utility belt was introduced in Detective Comics #29 (July 1939), followed by the boomerang-like batarang and the first bat-themed vehicle, the Batplane, in #31 (September 1939). The character's origin was revealed in #33 (November 1939), unfolding in a two-page story that establishes the brooding persona of Batman, a character driven by the death of his parents. Written by Finger, it depicts a young Bruce Wayne witnessing his parents' murder at the hands of a mugger. Days later, at their grave, the child vows that "by the spirits of my parents [I will] avenge their deaths by spending the rest of my life warring on all criminals".

The early, pulp-inflected portrayal of Batman started to soften in Detective Comics #38 (April 1940) with the introduction of Robin, Batman's junior counterpart. Robin was introduced, based on Finger's suggestion, because Batman needed a "Watson" with whom Batman could talk. Sales nearly doubled, despite Kane's preference for a solo Batman, and it sparked a proliferation of "kid sidekicks". The first issue of the solo spin-off series Batman was notable not only for introducing two of his most persistent enemies, the Joker and Catwoman, but for a pre-Robin inventory story, originally meant for Detective Comics #38, in which Batman shoots some monstrous giants to death. That story prompted editor Whitney Ellsworth to decree that the character could no longer kill or use a gun.

By 1942, the writers and artists behind the Batman comics had established most of the basic elements of the Batman mythos. In the years following World War II, DC Comics "adopted a postwar editorial direction that increasingly de-emphasized social commentary in favor of lighthearted juvenile fantasy". The impact of this editorial approach was evident in Batman comics of the postwar period; removed from the "bleak and menacing world" of the strips of the early 1940s, Batman was instead portrayed as a respectable citizen and paternal figure that inhabited a "bright and colorful" environment.

== Silver and Bronze Ages ==
=== 1950s and early 1960s ===
Batman was one of the few superhero characters to be continuously published as interest in the genre waned during the 1950s. In the story "The Mightiest Team in the World" in Superman #76 (June 1952), Batman teams up with Superman for the first time and the pair discover each other's secret identity. Following the success of this story, World's Finest Comics was revamped so it featured stories starring both heroes together, instead of the separate Batman and Superman features that had been running before. The team-up of the characters was "a financial success in an era when those were few and far between"; this series of stories ran until the book's cancellation in 1986.

Batman comics were among those criticized when the comic book industry came under scrutiny with the publication of psychologist Fredric Wertham's book Seduction of the Innocent in 1954. Wertham's thesis was that children imitated crimes committed in comic books, and that these works corrupted the morals of the youth. Wertham criticized Batman comics for their supposed homosexual overtones and argued that Batman and Robin were portrayed as lovers. Wertham's criticisms raised a public outcry during the 1950s, eventually leading to the establishment of the Comics Code Authority, a code that is no longer in use by the comic book industry. The tendency towards a "sunnier Batman" in the postwar years intensified after the introduction of the Comics Code. Scholars have suggested that the characters of Batwoman (in 1956) and the pre-Barbara Gordon Bat-Girl (in 1961) were introduced in part to refute the allegation that Batman and Robin were gay, and the stories took on a campier, lighter feel.

In the late 1950s, Batman stories gradually became more science fiction-oriented, an attempt at mimicking the success of other DC characters that had dabbled in the genre. New characters such as Batwoman, the original Bat-Girl, Ace the Bat-Hound, and Bat-Mite were introduced. Batman's adventures often involved odd transformations or bizarre space aliens. In 1960, Batman debuted as a member of the Justice League of America in The Brave and the Bold #28 (February 1960), and went on to appear in several Justice League comic book series starting later that same year.

=== "New Look" Batman and camp ===
By 1964, sales of Batman titles had fallen drastically. Bob Kane noted that, as a result, DC was "planning to kill Batman off altogether". In response to this, editor Julius Schwartz was assigned to the Batman titles. He presided over drastic changes, beginning with 1964's Detective Comics #327 (May 1964), which was cover-billed as the "New Look". Schwartz introduced changes designed to make Batman more contemporary, and to return him to more detective-oriented stories. He brought in artist Carmine Infantino to help overhaul the character. The Batmobile was redesigned, and Batman's costume was modified to incorporate a yellow ellipse behind the bat-insignia. The space aliens, time travel, and characters of the 1950s such as Batwoman, Ace the Bat-Hound, and Bat-Mite were retired. Bruce Wayne's butler Alfred was killed off (though his death was quickly reversed) while a new female relative for the Wayne family, Aunt Harriet Cooper, came to live with Bruce Wayne and Dick Grayson.

The debut of the Batman television series in 1966 had a profound influence on the character. The success of the series increased sales throughout the comic book industry, and Batman reached a circulation of close to 900,000 copies. Elements such as the character of Batgirl and the show's campy nature were introduced into the comics; the series also initiated the return of Alfred. Although both the comics and TV show were successful, the camp approach eventually wore thin and the show was canceled in 1968. In the aftermath, the Batman comics themselves started to decline in lost popularity once again. As Julius Schwartz noted, "When the television show was a success, I was asked to be campy, and of course when the show faded, so did the comic books."

Cover of Batman #227 (November 1970) returning Batman to the darker roots of the original publications. Art by Neal Adams.

Starting in 1969, writer Dennis O'Neil and artist Neal Adams made a deliberate effort to distance Batman from the campy portrayal of the 1960s TV series and to return the character to his roots as a "grim avenger of the night" despite sales starting to decline on the early 1970s. O'Neil said his idea was "simply to take it back to where it started. I went to the DC library and read some of the early stories. I tried to get a sense of what Kane and Finger were after."

O'Neil and Adams first collaborated on the story "The Secret of the Waiting Graves" in Detective Comics #395 (January 1970). Few stories were true collaborations between O'Neil, Adams, Schwartz, and inker Dick Giordano, and in actuality these men were mixed and matched with various other creators during the 1970s; nevertheless the influence of their work was "tremendous". Giordano said: "We went back to a grimmer, darker Batman, and I think that's why these stories did so well ..." While the work of O'Neil and Adams was popular with fans, the acclaim did little to improve declining sales; the same held true with a similarly acclaimed run by writer Steve Englehart and penciler Marshall Rogers in Detective Comics #471–476 (August 1977 – April 1978), which went on to influence the 1989 movie Batman and be adapted for Batman: The Animated Series, which debuted in 1992. Regardless, sales continued to drop through the 1970s and 1980s, hitting an all-time low in 1985.

== Modern Age ==
=== The Dark Knight Returns ===
Frank Miller's limited series The Dark Knight Returns (February–June 1986) returned the character to his darker roots, both in atmosphere and tone. The comic book, which tells the story of a 55-year-old Batman coming out of retirement in a possible future, reinvigorated interest in the character. The Dark Knight Returns was a financial success and has since become one of the medium's most noted touchstones. The series also sparked a major resurgence in the character's popularity.

That year, Dennis O'Neil took over as editor of the Batman titles and set the template for the portrayal of Batman following DC's status quo-altering 12-issue miniseries Crisis on Infinite Earths. O'Neil operated under the assumption that he was hired to revamp the character and as a result tried to instill a different tone in the books than had gone before. One outcome of this new approach was the "Year One" storyline in Batman #404–407 (February–May 1987), in which Frank Miller and artist David Mazzucchelli redefined the character's origins. Writer Alan Moore and artist Brian Bolland continued this dark trend with 1988's 48-page one-shot issue Batman: The Killing Joke, in which the Joker, attempting to drive Commissioner Gordon insane, cripples Gordon's daughter Barbara, and then kidnaps and tortures the commissioner, physically and psychologically.

The Batman comics garnered major attention in 1988 when DC Comics created a 900 number for readers to call to vote on whether Jason Todd, the second Robin, lived or died. Voters decided in favor of Jason's death by a narrow margin of 28 votes (see Batman: A Death in the Family).

=== Knightfall ===
The 1993 "Knightfall" story arc introduced a new villain, Bane, who critically injures Batman after pushing him to the limits of his endurance. Jean-Paul Valley, known as Azrael, is called upon to wear the Batsuit during Bruce Wayne's convalescence. Writers Doug Moench, Chuck Dixon, and Alan Grant worked on the Batman titles during "Knightfall", and would also contribute to other Batman crossovers throughout the 1990s. 1998's "Cataclysm" storyline served as the precursor to 1999's "No Man's Land", a year-long storyline that ran through all the Batman-related titles dealing with the effects of an earthquake-ravaged Gotham City. At the conclusion of "No Man's Land", O'Neil stepped down as editor and was replaced by Bob Schreck.

Another writer who rose to prominence on the Batman comic series was Jeph Loeb. Along with longtime collaborator Tim Sale, they wrote two miniseries (The Long Halloween and Dark Victory) that pit an early-in-his-career version of Batman against his entire rogues gallery (including Two-Face, whose origin was re-envisioned by Loeb) while dealing with various mysteries involving serial killers Holiday and the Hangman.

== 21st century ==
=== Hush and Under the Hood ===
In 2003, Loeb teamed with artist Jim Lee to work on another mystery arc: "Batman: Hush" for the main Batman book. The 12–issue story line has Batman and Catwoman teaming up against Batman's entire rogues gallery, including an apparently resurrected Jason Todd, while seeking to find the identity of the mysterious supervillain Hush. While the character of Hush failed to catch on with readers, the arc was a sales success for DC. The series became #1 on the Diamond Comic Distributors sales chart for the first time since Batman #500 (October 1993) and Todd's appearance laid the groundwork for writer Judd Winick's subsequent run as writer on Batman, with another multi-issue arc, "Under the Hood", which ran from Batman #637–650 (April 2005 – April 2006).

=== All Star Batman & Robin the Boy Wonder ===
In 2005, DC launched All Star Batman & Robin the Boy Wonder, a stand-alone comic book miniseries set outside the main DC Universe continuity. Written by Frank Miller and drawn by Jim Lee, the series was a commercial success for DC Comics, although it was widely panned by critics for its writing, characterization, and strong depictions of violence.

=== Grant Morrison's Batman Run ===
Starting in 2006, Grant Morrison and Paul Dini were the regular writers of Batman and Detective Comics, with Morrison reincorporating controversial elements of Batman lore. Most notably of these elements were the science fiction-themed storylines of the 1950s Batman comics, which Morrison revised as hallucinations Batman experienced under the influence of various mind-bending gases and extensive sensory deprivation training. In "Batman and Son", Morrison re-introduced the son of Bruce Wayne and Talia al Ghul, Damian Wayne, to continuity, who had been raised by his mother in the League of Assassins. A son of Wayne and Al Ghul had previously appeared as an infant in the non-canon Son of the Demon. In the storyline "The Three Ghosts of Batman", Morrison expanded upon the gun-wielding imposter Batman from his first issue on the series, introducing two more imposter Batmen, all former police officers. Morrison created an apocalyptic possible future in Batman #666, where Damian Wayne has adopted the role of Batman following his father's death, but unlike Bruce Wayne, having no issue with killing criminals. Following this story, Morrison reintroduced a number of Silver Age characters such as Knight and Squire, El Gaucho, and Man of Bats in The Batmen of All Nations, laying the groundwork for their future work on Batman Incorporated.

== The New 52 ==
In September 2011, DC Comics' entire line of superhero comic books, including its Batman franchise, were cancelled and relaunched with new #1 issues as part of The New 52 reboot. Bruce Wayne is the only character to operate under the Batman identity and is featured in Batman, Detective Comics, Batman and Robin, and Batman: The Dark Knight. Dick Grayson returns to the mantle of Nightwing and appears in his own ongoing series. While many characters have their histories significantly altered to attract new readers, Batman's history remained mostly intact.

Batman Incorporated was relaunched in 2012 to complete Grant Morrison's "Leviathan" storyline . It also contextualized the possible future of Batman #666 as a vision Bruce Wayne experienced while travelling through time following Final Crisis, and reached its conclusion in 2013. The final act of Morrison's run reached its emotional climax with the death of Damian Wayne at the hands of his evil clone Heretic. The run concluded with Leviathan's plan to destroy the world thwarted by the members of Batman Incorporated, the reveal that Kathy Kane was alive and working for the organization Spyral, and the death of Talia al Ghul at Kane's hands. In the final pages of issue #13, Ra's al Ghul stands in a room of clones of Damian Wayne, declaring "Sons of Batman. Rise!", which would be touched on in Peter Tomasi's Batman and Robin soon after.

With the beginning of The New 52, Scott Snyder took over as writer of the Batman title. His first major story arc was "Night of the Owls", where Batman confronts the Court of Owls, a secret society that has controlled Gotham for centuries. It was followed by Batman vol. 2 #0, published in June 2012, a brief flashback to Zero Year, teasing the upcoming Zero Year arc. The second story arc was "Death of the Family", in which the Joker returns to Gotham and attacks each member of the Batman family in an attempt to prove Batman's extended cast makes the character weaker.

The third story arc was "Batman: Zero Year", which redefined Batman's origin in The New 52, replacing the previous Year One storyline. The final story before the Convergence (2015) storyline was "Endgame", depicting the supposed final battle between Batman and the Joker when he unleashes the deadly Endgame virus onto Gotham City. The storyline ends in issue #40 with Batman and Joker's apparent deaths.

Starting with Batman vol. 2 #41, Commissioner James Gordon takes over Bruce's mantle as a new, state-sanctioned, robotic-Batman, debuting in the Free Comic Book Day special comic Divergence. However, Bruce Wayne is soon revealed to be alive, albeit now with almost total amnesia of his life as Batman, but, with Alfred's help, remembers his life as Bruce Wayne. Bruce Wayne finds happiness and proposes to his girlfriend, Julie Madison, but Mr. Bloom heavily injures Jim Gordon, takes control of Gotham City, and threatens to destroy the city by energizing a particle reactor to create a "strange star". Bruce Wayne discovers the truth that he was Batman and after talking to a stranger who smiles a lot (it is heavily implied that this is the amnesic Joker) he forces Alfred to implant his memories as Batman, but at the cost of his memories as the reborn Bruce Wayne. He returns and helps Jim Gordon defeat Mr. Bloom and shut down the reactor. Gordon gets his job back as the commissioner, and the government Batman project is shut down.

In 2015, DC Comics released The Dark Knight III: The Master Race, the sequel to Frank Miller's The Dark Knight Returns and The Dark Knight Strikes Again.

== DC Rebirth ==
In June 2016, the DC Rebirth event relaunched DC Comics' entire line of comic book titles. Batman was rebooted as starting with a one-shot issue entitled Batman: Rebirth #1 (August 2016). The series then began shipping twice-monthly as a third volume, starting with Batman vol. 3 #1 (August 2016). The third volume of Batman was written by Tom King, and artwork was provided by David Finch and Mikel Janín. The Batman series introduced two vigilantes, Gotham and Gotham Girl. Detective Comics resumed its original numbering system starting with June 2016's #934, and the New 52 series was labeled as volume 2, with issues numbering from #0-52. Similarly with the Batman title, the New 52 issues were labeled as volume 2 and encompassed issues #0-52. Writer James Tynion IV and artists Eddy Barrows and Alvaro Martinez worked on Detective Comics #934, and the series initially featured a team consisting of Tim Drake, Stephanie Brown, Cassandra Cain, and Clayface, led by Batman and Batwoman.

DC Comics ended the DC Rebirth branding in December 2017, opting to include everything under a larger DC Universe banner and naming. The continuity established by DC Rebirth continues across DC's comic book titles, including volume 1 of Detective Comics and volume 3 of Batman.

After the conclusion of Batman vol. 3 #85 a new creative team consisting of James Tynion IV with art by Tony S. Daniel and Danny Miki replaced Tom King, David Finch and Mikel Janín. Following Tynion's departure from DC Comics, Joshua Williamson, who previously wrote the backup story in issue #106, briefly became the new head writer in December 2021 starting with issue #118. Chip Zdarsky then became the head writer with artist Jorge Jimenez returning after having previously illustrated parts of Tynion's run. Their run begun with issue #125, which was released on July 5, 2022 and starts with "Failsafe", a six-issue story arc.

== See also ==
- Golden Age of Comic Books
- Silver Age of Comic Books
- Bronze Age of Comic Books
- Modern Age of Comic Books

== Sources ==
- Boichel, Bill (1991). "Batman: Commodity as Myth". The Many Lives of the Batman: Critical Approaches to a Superhero and His Media. London: Routledge. ISBN 978-0-85170-276-6.
- Daniels, Les (1999). Batman: The Complete History. Chronicle Books. ISBN 978-0-8118-2470-5.
- Daniels, Les (1995). DC Comics: Sixty Years of the World's Favorite Comic Book Heroes. Bulfinch. ISBN 978-0-8212-2076-4.
- Daniels, Les (2003). DC Comics: A Celebration of the World's Favorite Comic Book Heroes. Billboard Books/Watson-Guptill Publications. ISBN 978-0-8230-7919-3.
- Daniels, Les (April 2004). Batman: The Complete History: The Life and Times of the Dark Knight. Chronicle Books. ISBN 978-0-8118-4232-7.
- Pearson, Roberta E.; Uricchio, William, eds. (1991). The Many Lives of the Batman: Critical Approaches to a Superhero and His Media. London: Routledge. ISBN 978-0-85170-276-6.
- Wright, Bradford W. (2001). Comic Book Nation: The Transformation of Youth Culture in America. The Johns Hopkins University Press. ISBN 978-0-8018-6514-5.
