= Superman and Batman versus Aliens and Predator =

Crossover comic book

Cover art by Ariel Olivetti

Superman and Batman versus Aliens and Predator is a comic book co-published by DC Comics and Dark Horse Comics. It was written by Mark Schultz, with art by Ariel Olivetti. It is a crossover in which Superman and Batman have to battle both the Aliens and Predator. While both superheroes have had crossovers with the monsters individually, this was the first time they were with both at the same time. The two-part series was released on January 8 and then on February 14, 2007.

== Plot ==
The story takes place somewhere in the Andes. It is revealed that during the Ice Age, a Predator ship landed on Earth and could not leave because it could not escape its gravitational pull. The Predators landed in a then-dormant volcano. Now in our modern time, a mountain climbing crew has gone missing in the Andes. Batman becomes the emissary of Superman, whom the Predators believe to be a sun spirit, through a show of strength. They decide to help the Predators leave Earth for the good of themselves and the planet.

== Publication ==
- Superman and Batman vs. Aliens and Predator (by Mark Schultz and Ariel Olivetti, two-issue miniseries, January 2007, tpb, 112 pages, DC Comics, May 2007, ISBN 1-4012-1328-6)

== Other media ==
=== Merchandise ===
In 2019, toy company NECA unveiled a series of action figure box sets inspired by the crossover, as well as the prior Superman/Aliens and Batman vs Predator miniseries. The figure sets included:

  - Superman and Xenomorph
  - Armored Batman and Predator
  - Batman and Joker Xenomorph
  - Green Lantern (Hal Jordan) (with alternate John Stewart head) and Sinestro Corps Predator

== See also ==
- Superman/Aliens
- Superman/Batman
- Aliens Versus Predator
- Superman vs. Predator
- Batman/Aliens
- Batman Versus Predator
- Batman: Dead End
