= World War III (DC Comics) =

Comic book saga

- Publisher: DC Comics
- Publication date: December 1999 – May 2000
- Genre: Superhero
- Title(s): JLA #36-41
- Main character: Justice League

Creative team
- Writer: Grant Morrison
- Artist: Howard Porter
- World War III: ISBN 1-56389-618-4

"World War III" is the title of two comic book sagas published by DC Comics and involving many of the superheroes of the DC Universe. The first was published in 2000 as a story-arc in the JLA ongoing series; the second was published in 2007 as a limited series of its own.

== JLA ==
The original "World War III" saga was a narrative arc of the JLA series written by Grant Morrison and drawn by Howard Porter in 2000 (over JLA #36-41), and currently in print as the JLA, Vol. 6: World War III paperback. This was the final arc written by Morrison and provided explanation for hints dropped over his tenure about the importance of the JLA as "forerunners" in defending the Earth from an impending menace.

Lex Luthor, failing to defeat the JLA, forms a new Injustice Gang consisting of Prometheus, Queen Bee, and General Wade Eiling. The team infiltrates the Watchtower and defeats the JLA, who learn that the entity Mageddon is controlling them.

Aztek, who was created to oppose Mageddon, is killed in battle with him. The JLA gives superpowers to the population of the Earth, who unite in the decisive effort to vanquish Mageddon and save the planet, keeping it occupied long enough for Superman to disable Mageddon.

== 52 ==
World War III

Publication information
- Publisher: DC Comics
- Schedule: Monthly
- Format: Limited series
- Genre: Superhero
- Publication date: April 2007
- No. of issues: 4
- Main character(s): Black Adam; Martian Manhunter

Creative team
- Written by: Keith Champagne; John Ostrander
- Artist(s): Pat Oliffe; Drew Geraci; Andy Smith; Ray Snyder; Tom Derenick; Norm Rapmund; Jack Jadson; Rodney Ramos

Collected editions
- DC: World War III: ISBN 1-4012-1504-1

The title World War III was also used in 2007 for a four-issue mini-series written by Keith Champagne (#1-2) and John Ostrander (#3-4), and drawn by Pat Olliffe and Tom Derenick, with covers by Ethan Van Sciver. It tells the story of Black Adam's rage against humanity after his family was murdered, and he can only be stopped when the entire superhero community rallies together. The limited series was a tie into DC's weekly comic book series 52, occurring on "Week 50" of the series, which takes place during the missing year following Infinite Crisis. 52 was conceived to explain many of the drastic changes that occurred in the DC Universe during that missing year; however, the series ultimately evolved in a different direction, focusing on its own cast of characters, and consequently, World War III was conceived to revisit the original intent of the series and explain the changes that occurred.

=== Plot ===
Five weeks before the main events of the series, Martian Manhunter tries to telepathically fight Adam following his near obliteration of Bialya, first disguising himself as a young girl, but is overwhelmed by his darkest memory and flees into space. From there, Martian Manhunter observes the upcoming battle, which is narrated through his point of view.

Black Adam rampages across Earth, devastating the Leaning Tower of Pisa, Sydney, Australia, and the Great Pyramids. Father Time unsuccessfully tries to stop Adam, who rips off his face. In retaliation, Adam throws an aircraft carrier at New York City. Firestorm and Firehawk work together to stop the thrown carrier, transmuting it into harmless snow.

In the meantime, Martian Manhunter observes Supergirl return from the 31st century. Unstable from the time travel, she passes through him, with her body stabilizing as she plunges to Earth.

The Doom Patrol attempt to halt Adam's rampage in Pisa, and Donna Troy assumes Wonder Woman's mantle. In Sub Diego, the effects of the Geiss serum on its inhabitants are wearing off. This causes most of the population to lose their ability to breathe underwater, except for Aquagirl and a few others. Aquaman meets with Poseidon and Triton, asking for the power to save Sub Diego. The gods, while denying any involvement with the aquatic humans' fate, grant Aquaman new powers. Aquaman succeeds in raising a large portion of Sub Diego above water, but is transfigured in a monstrous, amnesiac and almost mad form, called the Dweller in the Depths.

Martian Manhunter continues following Adam's trail, distracting his thoughts from the Justice Society, once again united to give aid to the suffering populace. He finds him battling the Teen Titans, asking vengeance for their supposed betrayal of Osiris. Over the course of two confrontations, he kills Young Frankenstein and Terra. This causes Martian Manhunter to come back to Earth and alert Checkmate. Kate Spencer's cover as Manhunter is almost blown; still her pursuing of the greater good convinced Martian Manhunter to enact another step in his maturation: he goes to his former police district as John Jones, revealing himself to his former friends, and burning his former detective agency to the ground to prevent himself from ever assuming a disguise again. Not even Captain Marvel can beat Adam and asks the Egyptian gods to remove Adam's powers, but they tell him he has their blessing.

Finally Black Adam is delayed in China by the Great Ten. At first, the assembled heroes can do nothing, as China has promised to fire nuclear missiles if they cross the Great Wall of China. Martian Manhunter attacks Adam, filling his mind with images from the destruction of Mars and from every death he has caused. Adam is halted for a few minutes, just the time needed for Captain Marvel to stop him. Black Adam loses his powers, with the magic word that could restore his powers being changed to an unknown phrase that he does not know.

From their satellite base, the Monitors declare the end of "World War III", intended as the war of one man against the whole world, but express fear for an even darker event looming over Earth.

== Collected editions ==
Both stories have been collected into trade paperbacks:

- JLA Vol. 6: World War III (collects JLA #34-41, 2000, ISBN 1-56389-618-4)
- DC: World War III (collects 52 Week 50 and World War III four-issue mini-series, 2007, ISBN 1-4012-1504-1)

== See also ==
- World War III in popular culture
