= Batman: Dead End =

2003 film by Sandy Collora

- Directed by: Sandy Collora
- Written by: Sandy Collora
- Based on: Characters by Bob Kane; Bill Finger; Jerry Robinson; Dan O'Bannon; Ronald Shusett; Jim Thomas; John Thomas
- Produced by: Daren Hicks; Simon Tams
- Starring: Clark Bartram; Andrew Koenig
- Distributed by: Collora Studios; TheForce.Net
- Release date: July 19, 2003
- Running time: 8 minutes
- Country: United States
- Language: English
- Budget: $30,000

Batman: Dead End is a 2003 superhero fan film written and directed by Sandy Collora that premiered on July 19, 2003 at San Diego Comic-Con, and on the internet shortly thereafter. The film crosses over the DC Comics superhero Batman with the Alien and Predator science fiction film franchises.

In August 2023, Eric Calderon and Dave Baker revealed that they had considered adapting the Yautja "Big Red" from the fan film to the unreleased official Alien vs. Predator animated series Aliens vs. Predator: Annihilation.

== Plot ==
During a stormy night in Gotham City, the Joker escapes from Arkham Asylum while Batman prepares to hunt for him. Batman finds and corners the Joker in an alleyway, but before Batman can take him back to the asylum, the Joker is quickly dragged off by a Xenomorph and is presumably killed. Another Xenomorph attacks Batman, but is killed by a Yautja, "Big Red", who Batman fights and defeats. Suddenly, more Yautja appear just as more Xenomorphs emerge from the darkness behind Batman. The film ends abruptly with a cliffhanger as Batman is surrounded by the Xenomorphs and the Predators.

== Cast ==
- Clark Bartram as Bruce Wayne/Batman
- Andrew Koenig as the Joker
- Kurt Carley as the Predator/Yautja
- Jake McKinnon as the Alien
- Dragon Dronet, Patrick Magee and Kurt Carley as other Predators

== Production ==
The film was made for a reported $30,000 and filmed in parts of North Hollywood, California, as a stand-in for Gotham City. Collora filmed a similar project, 2004's World's Finest, with much of the same cast and crew.

Sylvester Stallone and Mark Hamill (who voices Joker in Batman: The Animated Series) were originally cast as Batman and Joker. Stallone eventually dropped out due to his agents telling him that Warner Bros. could get involved. Hamill dropped out for similar reasons, as Hamill dropped out after Stallone did.

== Reception ==
Film director and comic book writer Kevin Smith called it "possibly the truest, best Batman movie ever made", and comic book artist Alex Ross praised it as "Batman the way I've always wanted to see him". Collora has stated in interviews that the film was made as a demonstration reel to attract attention to his directing skills, and as such, succeeded in its goal.

Fan Films Quarterly listed Batman: Dead End as one of the 10 most pivotal moments in fan film history in its Summer 2006 issue.

== Potential official adaptation ==
In August 2023, Eric Calderon and Dave Baker revealed that they had considered adapting the Yautja "Big Red" from the fan film to the unreleased official Alien vs. Predator animated series Aliens vs. Predator: Annihilation.

== See also ==
The Dark Horse comic books which first touched on similar themes are:

- Batman/Aliens
- Batman Versus Predator
