= Rodolfo Damaggio =

Brazilian artist

Rodolfo Goulart Damaggio (born April 11, 1965) is a Brazilian comic book artist, animator, concept artist and storyboard artist.
