= Superman/Aliens =

American comic book limited series

Superman/Aliens Superman/Aliens 2: God War
- Superman/Aliens #1, art by Dan Jurgens & Kevin Nowlan.

Publication information
- Publisher: Dark Horse, DC
- Schedule: (1st series): Monthly (2nd series): Bi-monthly
- Format: Limited series
- Publication date: (1st series): July–September 1995 (2nd series): May–December 2002
- No. of issues: (1st series): 3 (2nd series): 4
- Main character(s): Superman, Aliens

Creative team
- Written by: Dan Jurgens; Chuck Dixon
- Penciller(s): Dan Jurgens; Jon Bogdanove
- Inker: Kevin Nowlan
- Letterer: Bill Oakley
- Colorist: Gregory Wright
- Editor(s): Lynn Adair; Bob Kahan

Superman/Aliens is an American comic book limited series about a battle between the superhero Superman and the Xenomorphs from the Alien film series. The writers use the plot device of Superman's powers temporarily diminishing due to him being in a location with a lack of sunlight that his body requires to give him his powers to make the Xenomorphs a believable threat to him.

Creative team on this miniseries: story and layout art by Dan Jurgens, with finished art by Kevin Nowlan. It was published by Dark Horse Comics in unison with DC Comics from July to September 1995.

== Plot ==
Accompanying Cheryl Kimble—the head of Lexcorp's space division—on the investigation of an incoming probe as part of Lexcorp's attempts to improve its public image, Clark is shocked to discover that the pod's transmissions are a Kryptonian distress call. Making contact with the pod, Superman receives a telepathic transmission from Argo City, which survived the destruction of its planet and is now running out of resources. Taking a ship to investigate the city—which is located far from any sun, causing his powers to fade the longer he remains—Superman discovers a small group of unconscious survivors and sends them back to the Lexcorp satellite in his ship. Further exploration puts him against an Alien, but his depleted powers allow the creature to wound him before he is rescued by Kara, another survivor of the city, who explains that the Aliens came from an abandoned freighter containing an Alien Queen that crashed on Argo years ago.

Back on the Lexcorp satellite, the chestbursters (immature Xenomorphs) hatch from the hosts that Superman sent back, leaving Doctor Kimble determined to capture and analyse them while Lois Lane is forced to face an Alien in the hangar, only just managing to force the Alien into space by opening the airlock while she hides in the ship. As Kimble witnesses two of the remaining chestbursters "hatch", Lois torches the infants with a spray can and a match, but she and Kimble are forced together to escape the last, full-grown Alien as it tears the satellite apart.

As Superman and Kara attempt to escape, both of them are captured and "impregnated" with embryos, but this gives them an advantage; since Superman's embryo is that of an Alien Queen, the Aliens will not risk harming him. As they escape, Superman learns that Kara is not from Krypton, but from Odiline, the planet where the Cleric—-the being who originally gave Superman the Eradicator-—laid the bodies of his Kryptonian followers to rest after their demise, with Odiline growing to revere Kryptonians as their spiritual protectors, adopting much of their customs and language. Reaching the freighter that brought the Aliens to Argo originally, the two discover escape pods and transporter booths, but the pods launch mechanisms are jammed; the only way to launch them is to destroy the ship. While Superman preps the coordinates, Kara sets the core to overload before returning to a transporter booth, but crucial seconds are lost when Superman uses the booth to teleport the embryo out of her, with Kara being forced out of the booth by an Alien attack moments before the ship is destroyed and the pod launched.

Arriving back in Earth's solar system, Superman's powers are restored in time to stop the chestburster from emerging, allowing him to "crush" it and regurgitate out of his system before catching the falling satellite, Kimble subsequently killing the last Alien. As Superman departs, he mourns Kara, unaware that she made it to a pod before Argo's destruction and remains lost in space.

== Superman/Aliens 2: God War ==
In 2002, a sequel was published called Superman/Aliens 2: God War. It was written by Chuck Dixon, with art by Jon Bogdanove and Kevin Nowlan.

=== Plot ===
Darkseid acquires several Alien eggs and sends them to attack New Genesis alongside his Parademons. Superman is visiting New Genesis at the time, and is able to advise his friends among the New Gods what to expect, but he is not able to stop an embryo from infesting Orion.

Learning that he will die from the embryo within him, Orion accompanies Superman on a mission to Apokolips to destroy the Alien Queen, despite the lack of sunlight on Apokolips weakening him. Despite the odds, they manage to destroy the Queen. Darkseid uses his Omega Beams to destroy the embryo within Orion, claiming that he may be Darkseid's enemy, but he is also his son and it would be unfitting for him to die in such a dishonorable manner.

After Superman and Orion's departure, however, Darkseid reveals to DeSaad that Orion being infested was the central focus of his plan; with Orion having been given some evidence that Darkseid may still think of him as a son, his loyalties to New Genesis may become divided at some crucial future date.

As the comic ends, Darkseid and DeSaad look in at a room filled with facehugger-infected Parademons in stasis, hinting at a possible sequel.

== Collected editions ==
The stories have been collected into trade paperbacks:

- Superman/Aliens (144 pages, August 1996, Titan Books, ISBN 1-85286-704-3, June 1996, Dark Horse Comics, ISBN 1-56971-167-4)
- Superman/Aliens 2: God War (96 pages, August 2003, Titan Books, ISBN 1-84023-720-1, July 2003, Dark Horse Comics, ISBN 1-56971-963-2)

== See also ==
- Superman and Batman versus Aliens and Predator
