= Batman: Face the Face =

2006 DC Comics story arc

"Face the Face"
- Cover to Detective Comics #817, art by Simone Bianchi.
- Publisher: DC Comics
- Publication date: May – August 2006
- Genre: Superhero
- Title(s): Batman #651-#654; Detective Comics #817-#820
- Main characters: Batman; Robin; Harvey Dent

Creative team
- Writer: James Robinson
- Artists: Michael Bair; Keith Champagne; Andy Clarke; Wayne Faucher; Don Kramer; Leonard Kirk
- Face the Face: ISBN 978-1-4012-0910-0

"Face the Face" is an eight-issue Batman story arc written by James Robinson with art by Leonard Kirk, Andy Clarke, Don Kramer, Keith Champagne, Michael Bair, and Wayne Faucher. It was originally published in Detective Comics #817-820 and Batman #651-654 by the comic book publishing company DC Comics from May through August 2006. This particular story is significant because it marks Batman's return to active duty one year after the events of Infinite Crisis.

== Plot synopsis ==
Batman and Robin return to Gotham City one year following the events of Infinite Crisis. It is revealed that Batman, in his absence, entrusted the safety of Gotham City to former district attorney Harvey Dent, better known as Two-Face, who has undergone plastic surgery and overcome his split personality.

Batman discovers that several of his enemies - KGBeast, Magpie, and Ventriloquist - were murdered with a double-barrelled gun once used by Harvey Dent. The gun was subsequently found with Harvey Dent's fingerprints on the gun. Surveillance footage also showed Harvey talking to the KGBeast, the Magpie and the Ventriloquist. A fourth villain, Orca, was also detected in the surveillance footage.

Meanwhile, Batman, realising that his nocturnal activities prevented him from conducting investigations during the day, put private investigator Jason Bard on a retainer to assist him. Jason was asked to dig into Orca and found that before she became a supervillain, she was married to Terry Capshaw. Terry confirmed that Orca was associating herself with KGBeast, Magpie and Ventriloquist and revealed they were all working for the Penguin, but were convinced by Harvey to switch sides and act as Dent's spies. Terry was killed by the Tally Man before he could reveal anything more to Jason.

Batman confronted Harvey with the murders of his spies and his prints on the murder weapon with the intention of wanting Harvey to clear up the misunderstandings. Harvey refused and blew up his apartment instead. He struggles with the Two-Face persona that is still deep within him, leading Harvey to toss a coin, and ultimately decides to revert to Two-Face.

Two-Face then takes over the Gotham Zoo, killing four cops and crippling one other before releasing all the animals, except for a male and a female of each species in the zoo. Batman and Robin confront and defeat Two-Face, and Robin successfully defuses a bomb Harvey planted at the zoo.

Batman figured out that it was Warren White, a.k.a. the Great White Shark, who had framed Harvey Dent for the murders and was the secret crime boss of Gotham City.

Also in this story, Batman and Harvey Bullock agree on a new, working relationship, indicating that there is a "clean slate" between them.

At the end of the series, Bruce Wayne decides to adopt Tim Drake as his son.

== Publication history ==
The story was featured in publication across the two main Batman-centric titles, and ran from May to August 2006. The titles and issue numbers include:

- Detective Comics #817-820
- Batman #651-654

=== Collected editions ===
The entire series was collected in a trade paperback book form and released on 6 September 2006 (ISBN 978-1-4012-0910-0).

== Reception ==
Hilary Goldstein gave Detective Comics #817 a positive review, calling it an ideal jumping on point for readers who have not read Batman in a while, and for longer term fans the effect of "One Year Later" was not too unsettling.
