= One Year Later (comics) =

2006 comic book storyline event running through the books published by DC Comics

"One Year Later" thematic stories
- Logo used by DC Comics in marketing the event

Publication information
- Publisher: DC Comics
- Schedule: Monthly
Title(s)
Listed by story title:
"Brothers in Blood"
Nightwing (vol. 2) #118–124
"Candor"
Supergirl (vol. 5) #6–8
This story arc started a month early
"Crawling Through the Wreckage"
Green Arrow (vol. 3) #60–65
"Face the Face"
Batman #651–654
Detective Comics #817–820
"The Fall and Rise of Vandal Savage"
JSA: Classified #10–13
"Ghost Stories"
JSA #83–87
"The Good Fight"
Outsiders (vol. 3) #34–43
"The New Teen Titans"
Teen Titans (vol. 3) #34–37
"Progeny"
Birds of Prey #92–95
"Psychobabble"
Manhunter (vol. 3) #20–24
"The Replacements"
Catwoman (vol. 2) #53–58
"Revenge of the Green Lanterns"
Green Lantern (vol. 4) #10–13
"Robin, Boy Wanted"
Robin (vol. 2) #148–153
"Up, Up and Away!"
Action Comics #837–840
Superman #650–653
Titles launched with a May 2006 cover date:
Aquaman: Sword of Atlantis #40-45
retitled from Aquaman vol. 5
Blue Beetle (vol. 7) #1–6
Firestorm: The Nuclear Man (vol. 2) #23–27
retitled from Firestorm vol. 2
Hawkgirl #50–56
retitled from Hawkman vol. 3
Supergirl and the Legion of Super-Heroes #16–19
retitled from Legion of Super-Heroes vol. 5
Titles launched with a June 2006 cover date:
Checkmate (vol. 2) #1–4
Crisis Aftermath: The Battle for Blüdhaven #1–6
Titles launched with a July 2006 cover date:
Crisis Aftermath: The Spectre #1–3
Secret Six (vol. 2) #1–6
Shadowpact #1–8
Titles launched with cover dates after July 2006:
The Flash: The Fastest Man Alive #1–6
Green Lantern Corps (vol. 2) #1–6
Justice League of America (vol. 2) #1–6
Wonder Woman (vol. 3) #1–4 Annual #1
- Formats: Multiple, thematically linked individual issues from multiple ongoing series.
- Genre: Superhero
- Publication date: May 2006

Reprints
- Collected editions
- Batman: Face the Face: ISBN 978-1-4012-0910-0
- Superman: Up, Up and Away!: ISBN 978-1-4012-0954-4
- Wonder Woman: Who is Wonder Woman?: ISBN 978-1-4012-1233-9

"One Year Later" is a 2006 comic book storyline running through the books published by DC Comics. As the title suggests, it involves a narrative jump exactly one year into the future of the DC Universe following the events of the "Infinite Crisis" storyline, to explore major changes within the continuities of the many different comic books within the DC Comics range.

== Synopsis ==
Following the events of the "Infinite Crisis" storyline, every DC comic series jumped ahead in-story by one year. The events of the missing year were depicted in real time in the weekly comic book series 52. The "One Year Later" storyline started in March 2006, starting the same week that Infinite Crisis #5 went to press, and before the first issue of 52. Most first issues bearing the "One Year Later" logo were the first parts of multi-issue storylines, and featured major changes to the status quo of each character, often intentionally left unexplained as these details would be filled in by the remaining issues of Infinite Crisis and the 52 series.

Numerous prominent heroes were missing or inactive for most of the year as the "One Year Later" issues commenced. Heroes known to have been gone for the missing year were Aquaman, Batman, Blue Beetle, Green Arrow, Hawkman, Martian Manhunter, Nightwing, Robin, Superman and Wonder Woman. The Flash went missing, but Jay Garrick had been protecting Keystone City in his absence.

=== The DC Trinity ===
The year-long absence of the three most prominent superheroes of the DC Comics universe—Superman, Batman and Wonder Woman—and their return to active duty was a significant part of both the "One Year Later" series and 52 series.

==== Superman ====
The Superman storyline "Up, Up and Away!", was co-written by Geoff Johns and Kurt Busiek, with art by Pete Woods (and two issues by Renato Guedes), and cover art by Terry and Rachel Dodson. The four-month, eight-part introductory story arc ran through both Action Comics #837–840 and Superman #650–653. The story features a depowered Clark Kent who, having lost his powers in the climax of Infinite Crisis, uses his skills as a journalist to defend Metropolis from both organized crime and Lex Luthor, who is newly bankrupt and disgraced due to his actions in the series 52. Superman regains his powers in time to battle the embittered Luthor, who is seeking revenge on him and wielding Kryptonian technology.

==== Batman ====
The Batman storyline "Face the Face", was written by James Robinson, with art by Leonard Kirk and Don Kramer. It ran through Detective Comics #817–820 and Batman #651–654.

The storyline concerns Batman and Robin's return to Gotham City after a year-long absence, and their investigation of an unknown person who has been murdering other supervillains (including Ventriloquist and KGBeast) These villains appear to be connected to Harvey Dent, who has reformed and taken up battling crime on Batman's behalf during the latter's absence. It is learned that Dent is not responsible for the killings; the mastermind is Great White Shark, who has established himself as Gotham's reigning crime boss. Dent's resulting stress, paranoia, and resentment of being under suspicion leads to the return of his Two-Face persona and his self-scarring, thus returning him to his life of crime. In the finale, Bruce Wayne offers to adopt Tim Drake, whose parents had previously died.

In addition to the return of Two-Face, "One Year Later" also saw the reappearance of several other significant elements of the Batman mythos that had previously been written out or retired, including the return of James Gordon as Gotham's police commissioner and Detective Harvey Bullock.

==== Wonder Woman ====
Unlike the Batman and Superman series, Wonder Woman was reintroduced with a new volume at issue one in June 2006. The introductory storyline was titled "Who Is Wonder Woman?" and was written by Allan Heinberg, with art by Terry and Rachel Dodson.

In the story, Donna Troy is depicted as having taken over the Wonder Woman title in Diana's absence, while Diana is shown to have accepted a government position at the Department of Metahuman Affairs under the alias of Diana Prince at Batman's urging. She is directed by Sarge Steel and is ironically assigned to the rescue mission of the new Wonder Woman, who has been captured by several of Wonder Woman's superpowered foes who demand that the "real" Wonder Woman be submitted to them. She is partnered on the case with a reluctant Tom Tresser, also known as Nemesis. Within the story it is revealed that prior to her admission into the department, Diana was also photographed in the company of an Eastern mystic code-named I Ching, and that the World Court has dropped the charges against her for the killing of Maxwell Lord. The story was completed in the series' first Annual in 2007.

== Storylines ==
- Green Lantern leads an assault on the Guardians' Manhunters and their new self-proclaimed leader the Cyborg Superman, and in the process manages to free Ke'Haan, Laira, Jack T. Chance, Honnu, Graf Toren, Kreon, and Boodikka, who were previously presumed dead. The Lanterns rejoin the Green Lantern Corps shortly thereafter.
- A new Aquaman (named Arthur Joseph Curry) appears and allies himself with King Shark and the Dweller of the Depths. The original Aquaman (Orin) has mysteriously disappeared.
- A revised Doom Patrol debuts.
- Bart Allen becomes the new Flash.
- Captain Atom is imprisoned within Blüdhaven by the military.
- Initially, Dick Grayson and Jason Todd both operate in New York City as Nightwing, but Jason uses lethal force. Jason eventually returns to the Red Hood identity.
- Hawkman has been missing for a year, and Hawkgirl has taken his place as St. Roch's protector.
- Lorraine Reilly replaces Martin Stein as a component member of Firestorm following his disappearance.
- Lady Shiva and Gypsy join Oracle's team in Birds of Prey. Black Canary returns, and Shiva takes Bethany Thorne, daughter of Matthew Thorne, the Crime Doctor as her student.
- Oliver Queen is the mayor of Star City and has not appeared in public as Green Arrow for a year.
- Cassandra Cain, under the influence of Deathstroke, has become the new leader of the League of Assassins.
- Robin leads the Teen Titans, which now includes Cyborg, Kid Devil, and Ravager (Rose Wilson). The mysterious new Titans East is based in New York. Robin is secretly trying to reclone Superboy, who was killed during Infinite Crisis. Beast Boy and Raven have broken up and left the team.
- Selina Kyle's friend Holly Robinson replaces her as Catwoman. Selina, now using the alias Irena Dubrovna, gives birth to a daughter named Helena.
- Supergirl and Power Girl work together as Nightwing (Power Girl) and Flamebird (Supergirl) in the bottled city of Kandor.
- The Outsiders are believed dead, but continue their work underground. The members, again led by Nightwing (Dick Grayson), are Grace, Thunder, Katana, Metamorpho, and Captain Boomerang (Owen Mercer).
- Vandal Savage crashlands back on Earth without his immortality and learns he has only 11 days to live. He seeks out Alan Scott for one last battle and fails. The clone that Savage used in his plot ends up being eaten by Savage himself, extending his life another year.
- A new Justice League forms with 10 members, including Superman, Batman, and Wonder Woman.
- Jaime Reyes, the third Blue Beetle, wakes up in the Arizona desert and is surprised to learn that it has been one year since the attack on Brother Eye.
- The Global Guardians recruit new members including Jet and Gloss from the New Guardians, Freedom Beast, the third Crimson Fox, Syrian hero Sandstorm, and a new Manticore.
- Bruno Mannheim launches many flying energy spheres on Metropolis to try to destroy Superman. Before teleporting away, he tells Superman that he now "has a new master, more powerful than Darkseid".
- A new Justice Society of America debuts, led by Alan Scott, Jay Garrick, and Ted Grant.
- Donna Troy becomes the new Wonder Woman and Hercules replaces Wonder Woman as an agent of Olympus.
- "1,001 Years Later", Supergirl appears in the 31st century and is revered as a member of the Superman family. Upon her arrival, she concludes that she is dreaming and that she is not actually in the future. The Legion of Super-Heroes believes that she has merely deluded herself into thinking that she is the Supergirl of the 21st century, but they nevertheless accept her as a new member.

=== Cancellations ===
In line with of the events of Infinite Crisis and 52, DC Comics canceled some of its long-running series, including; Wonder Woman vol. 2, The Flash vol. 2 (which was restarted after the death of Bart Allen), Gotham Central, Batman: Gotham Knights, Plastic Man, JLA, Superman vol. 2, and Batgirl.

=== Renaming ===
- Adventures of Superman has been renamed to simply Superman, restoring the original title of this series with issue #650.
- Aquaman is renamed Aquaman: Sword of Atlantis with issue #40, starring a new lead character.
- Firestorm is retitled Firestorm: The Nuclear Man from issue #23 onwards.
- Hawkman is renamed Hawkgirl from issue #50 onward.
- Legion of Super-Heroes is renamed Supergirl and the Legion of Super-Heroes starting with issue #16. The title also used a "1,001 Years Later" logo for several issues.

=== New series ===
As they are new titles, many of the following do not have the "One Year Later" to indicate a time jump since the previous issue.

Spin-offs from the Countdown to Infinite Crisis mini-series:

- Checkmate was an ongoing series spun off of The OMAC Project, with writer Greg Rucka and artist Jesus Saiz. The series ended with issue #31 in October 2008.
- Secret Six is a six-issue limited series spun off from Villains United, with writer Gail Simone and artist Brad Walker. An ongoing series began in September 2008.
- Shadowpact was launched as an ongoing series spun off from Day of Vengeance, with writer and artist Bill Willingham. It concluded in May 2008 with issue #25.

Follow-ups to Infinite Crisis:

- Blue Beetle has a new character following in the footsteps of Ted Kord, written by Keith Giffen and John Rogers, with art by Cully Hamner. The series concluded in February 2009 with issue #36.
- Crisis Aftermath: The Battle for Blüdhaven is a six-issue limited series written by Jimmy Palmiotti and Justin Grey, with art by Dan Jurgens and Palmiotti.
- Crisis Aftermath: The Spectre is a three-issue limited series written by Will Pfeifer with art by Cliff Chiang.
- Ion is a 12-issue limited series spun off from Green Lantern and Rann-Thanagar War, with writer Ron Marz and artist Greg Tocchini.

Relaunches:

- The Flash: Fastest Man Alive was started with the first seven issues written by Danny Bilson and Paul De Meo (the producers of the 1990s Flash TV series) with art by Ken Lashley. With the death of Bart Allen at the hands of the Rogues in issue #13, and the subsequent return of Wally West to the DCU, this title has reverted to being called The Flash, and picked up its numbering from prior to the name change. Thus The Flash #231 was released in August 2007 and ran through to December 2008 with issue #247. The title was put on hiatus prior to release of The Flash: Rebirth in April 2009. A subsequent reissuing of a new Flash title chronicling the new adventures of Barry Allen began in April 2010, but was brought to an end at issue #12 ahead of the Flashpoint DC Comics event. A new Flash title began in September 2011 as part of the DC Comics decision to relaunch 52 titles from issue #1.
- Green Lantern Corps is an ongoing series spun off from Green Lantern Corps: Recharge, beginning in April 2006. It ended with issue #63 in August 2011 ahead of the DC Comics decision to relaunch it as part of 52 titles from issue #1 in September 2011.
- Justice League of America, an ongoing series spun off from JLA, began in July 2006, written by Brad Meltzer and drawn by Ed Benes. It concluded in August 2011 with issue #60 ahead of the DC Comics decision to relaunch 52 titles from issue #1 in September 2011, of which a new Justice League of America title would be a part.
- Wonder Woman, volume 3, began in June 2006 with writer Allan Heinberg and artist Terry Dodson. It will be relaunched from #1 in September 2011 as part of the DC Comics decision to relaunch 52 titles from issue #1.
- JSA was canceled with issue #87 to be replaced by a new Justice Society of America series written by Geoff Johns, with art by Dale Eaglesham and covers (and storyline co-planning) by Alex Ross.

Brave New World:

- DCU: Brave New World is an 80-page special comic book showcasing six of the planned new titles: Uncle Sam and the Freedom Fighters, OMAC, Martian Manhunter, The Trials of Shazam!, The All-New Atom, and The Creeper. The final two pages reveal the existence of the Monitors.
  - The All-New Atom was an ongoing series, beginning in July 2006, written by Gail Simone and drawn by John Byrne. It concluded in July 2008 with issue #25.
  - Creeper is a six-issue limited series starting August 2006, written by Steve Niles and drawn by Justiniano.
  - Martian Manhunter is an eight-issue limited series starting in August 2006, written by A.J. Lieberman and drawn by Al Barrionuevo.
  - OMAC is an eight-issue limited series starting in July 2006, written by Bruce Jones and drawn by Renato Guedes.
  - The Trials of Shazam! is a 12-issue limited series, featuring the entire "Marvel Family" (Captain Marvel, Mary Marvel, and Captain Marvel Jr.); spun off from both Day of Vengeance and Infinite Crisis, starting in July 2006, written by Judd Winick and drawn by Howard Porter.
  - Uncle Sam and the Freedom Fighters is an eight-issue limited series spun off from Crisis Aftermath: Battle for Blüdhaven, starting in August 2006, written by Jimmy Palmiotti and Justin Gray with art by Daniel Acuña. A second eight issue limited series was launched in September 2007, written by Palmiotti and Gray with art by Renato Arlem, which had some ties to the previous series.

Replacements for canceled titles:

- Batman Confidential was an ongoing series with revolving creative teams. It concluded in March 2011.
- Superman Confidential was an ongoing series with revolving creative teams. It was canceled in April 2008.

In July 2006, most DC Comics titles wrapped up their 'One-Year Later' story lines and no longer display the 'One-Year Later' bullet on their covers.

== Significant events of the lost year ==
=== Aquaman ===
Aquaman's mysterious disappearance was subsequently followed by the arrival of one Arthur Joseph Curry. This new Arthur's origin appears to be similar to the Golden Age Aquaman's. Arthur meets 'The Dweller', who has an enchanted hand similar to Orin's and has been confirmed to be the original Aquaman. 'The Dweller' also tells Arthur of his future, which seems to be describing past events involving the original Aquaman.

=== Freedom of Power Treaty ===
There is a new Freedom of Power Treaty. The specifics and structure have not been detailed, but it appears to place limits on the activities of heroes outside their nation of origin. Having broken the treaty numerous times, Hal Jordan is considered a criminal by most of the world. Only the Rocket Red Brigade, Green Lantern Hal Jordan, and the Outsiders have been confirmed to be affected by it (Green Lantern #10, 2006). The Outsiders operated illegally and underground with all current members at the time (excluding Nightwing) presumed dead by the general public. As well as this, the Chinese government has formed a team called the Great Ten in the intervening year, and is currently working on a supersoldier program.

=== Gotham City ===
James Gordon has returned to the role of Gotham City Police Commissioner. Although the exact details have not been revealed as yet, it is known that his return - and that of Harvey Bullock - to the GCPD follows the cracking of a major corruption case in the GCPD by Bullock. Harvey Dent, believed cured of the multiple-personality disorder/psychosis issues that created his Two-Face persona, has been in charge of keeping Gotham safe as a result of a deal with Batman.

=== Superboy memorials ===
Monuments to the fallen hero have been erected in at least two locations:

- In Metropolis, the statue depicting Superman holding an eagle dating back to his first battle with Doomsday has been joined by one of Superboy (as seen in Action Comics #837), honoring his sacrifice and actions during Infinite Crisis. 52 #1 depicts the memorial, apparently erected within only a few days of Superboy's death.
- A second statue is erected in front of Titans Tower in San Francisco.

== Aftermath ==
One of the more noticeable occurrences to come out of Infinite Crisis and One Year Later was the change in Batman's demeanor. He has become more accepting of others' opinions, is more polite, and apologizes to allies when he makes errors in judgment. This does not change his approach to crime, however. Some may argue that while he has "softened" his approach to his friends, he has hardened his approach to his enemies.

Many Silver Age components have been reintroduced to Superman and his supporting cast. The character of Mon-El, the interior design of the Fortress of Solitude, Superman starting his career by being known as a "super-boy" (sans uniform), and his teenage membership in the Legion of Super-Heroes are all recognizable Silver Age components that were not included in continuity before Infinite Crisis. The stories are also beginning to aesthetically resemble the Superman feature films by using the same exterior design for the Fortress of Solitude, as well as modeling Jor-El after actor Marlon Brando. These changes also bring current Superman stories more in line with the television series Smallville, which incorporates many of the same elements of classic comics and the feature films.

Wonder Woman actively keeps her secret identity and has a flirtatious relationship with Nemesis, a co-worker at the Department of Metahuman Affairs. The finale of the "Who is Wonder Woman" arc established that her secret identity is now a physical as well as aesthetic transformation; as "Diana Prince", she is physically a normal human, regaining her powers only when she transforms into Wonder Woman.

Bart Allen's tenure as The Flash was one of the shorter lived occurrences, as the new series starring him lasted 13 issues, the last of which included the character's death. Predecessor Wally West has since retaken the mantle of the Flash. Many heroes, most notably members of the Teen Titans, mourn his loss. This has also led into a subplot in DC's weekly series Countdown to Final Crisis, where many heroes are shown to be actively searching for the Rogues who killed Bart.

The Green Lantern Corps members that were recovered from the Manhunter homeworld of Biot still despise Hal Jordan for actions Parallax committed while in control of him. Because of this, various personal cliques have formed among certain Lanterns that question Jordan being among them still. Often Jordan is defended by Green Lantern Honor Guard member Guy Gardner. The lost Lanterns proved to be valuable field Lanterns on the front lines in the Sinestro Corps War, with some of them joining the ranks of the Alpha Lanterns.
