= James Robinson (writer) =

British writer of comic books and screenplays

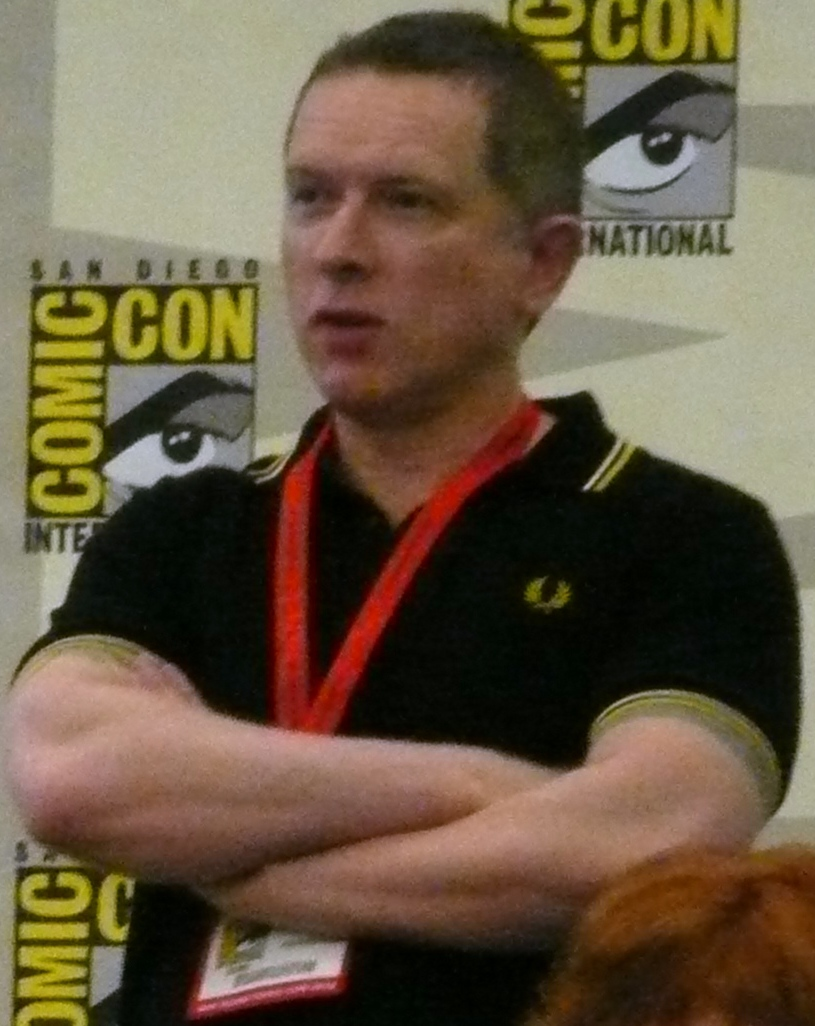
- Robinson at San Diego Comic-Con in 2010
- Born: April 1, 1963 (age 63)
- Area: Writer
- Notable works: The Golden Age: Starman; Leave It to Chance; The Justice Society Returns; The League of Extraordinary Gentlemen; Batman: Face the Face; Superman: New Krypton; Justice League: Cry for Justice; Earth 2
- Awards: Inkpot Award 2012

James Dale Robinson (born April 1, 1963 in Manchester, England is a British writer of American comic books and screenplays best known for co-creating the character of Starman (Jack Knight) with Tony Harris and reviving the Justice Society of America in the late 1990s. His other notable works include the screenplay for the film adaptation of the Alan Moore and Kevin O'Neill's comic book series The League of Extraordinary Gentlemen and the multi-year crossover storyline "Superman: New Krypton".

== Career ==
Robinson made his writing debut in 1989 with the graphic novel London's Dark, illustrated by Paul Johnson and later named one of the 500 "essential" graphic novels, as it was "at the vanguard [...] of British graphic novels as a whole" despite being "a very raw work, full of experimentation". He continued contributing short stories to various anthologies, including "Grendel: Devil's Whisper" which appeared in A1, before breaking into the American market with a number of Terminator series for Dark Horse. In 1993, Robinson penned the limited series The Golden Age for DC Comics, which, despite being an Elseworlds story, established much of the backstory he would later use in his arguably most renowned work, Starman. With Starman, Robinson took the aging Golden Age character of the same name and revitalized both him and all those who had used the name over the decades, weaving them into an interconnected whole. In 1997, Robinson's work on the title garnered him an Eisner Award for "Best Serialized Story". In the late 90s, Robinson worked on a follow-up series to The Golden Age, to be titled The Silver Age and illustrated by Howard Chaykin, although he ultimately decided not to pursue the project as the bulk of his ideas were presented in Mark Waid and Brian Augustyn's 1998 series JLA: Year One.

In addition to Starman, Robinson's DC work includes frequent contributions to the anthology series Batman: Legends of the Dark Knight, a Vigilante mini-series and The Sandman spin-off series Witchcraft for Vertigo. In 1999, Robinson and his writing partner David S. Goyer spearheaded the return of the Golden Age team of superheroes Justice Society of America to the mainstream DC Universe with the story arc "The Justice Society Returns" and the launch of the ongoing series JSA. Robinson left the title after five issues while Goyer continued co-writing it with Geoff Johns, with whom Robinson would later launch the JSA spin-off series Hawkman. Similarly, he served as a transitional writer on several Marvel titles, such as Cable and Generation X, contributing to the "Operation: Zero Tolerance" inter-title crossover storyline. Robinson wrote a brief run on the Captain America series that was then-recently relaunched as part of the "Heroes Reborn" initiative. Other work for Marvel includes Ectokid, one of the series created by the horror/fantasy novelist Clive Barker for the company's Razorline imprint. At Image, Robinson wrote a brief run on Wildcats that further developed the team's mythology and launched the creator-owned series Leave It to Chance with artist Paul Smith's, which won them two more Eisner Awards in 1997, for "Best New Series" and "Best Title for Younger Readers".

Robinson made a foray into screenwriting with a screenplay for the 1993 direct-to-video short film Firearm, based on the comic book series of the same name published by Malibu. In the late 90s, Robinson and David S. Goyer wrote an unused draft for then-upcoming film Freddy vs. Jason and scripted Evermere for C2 Pictures, which aimed for a 2000 release with Chuck Russell attached to direct. Robinson's best known work as a screenwriter is the 2003 adaptation of The League of Extraordinary Gentlemen, which caused some controversy among fans of the original work, many of whom were disappointed that the film took many liberties and changed the tone of the source material. Early drafts had reportedly relocated much of the action from England to America, allegedly in an attempt to make it more acceptable to American audience.

After taking a break from writing comics, Robinson returned in 2006 with an eight-issue storyline "Batman: Face the Face", which ran through both Batman and Detective Comics as part of DC Comics' company-wide initiative "One Year Later". In 2008, he took over the writing duties of the ongoing Superman series, starting with the storyline "The Coming of Atlas". In 2009, Robinson launched Justice League: Cry for Justice, intended to run as a second ongoing Justice League title but turned into a 7-issue mini-series instead due to poor critical reception. Despite the controversial reception, Robinson was nominated for Best Writing in the 2010 Eisner Awards. In October 2009, Robinson took over the regular Justice League of America ongoing title with and artist Mark Bagley, who was later replaced by Brett Booth. In May 2010, Robinson and Sterling Gates co-wrote War of the Supermen, the limited series that acted as the culmination of the Superman crossover storyline that started two years prior with "Superman: New Krypton". Robinson concluded his run on Superman with issue #700 (Aug. 2010). In 2011, Robinson launched the 12-issue series The Shade, starring the eponymous character closely associated with the Starman series. The following year, he launched the Earth 2 ongoing series which reimagined the long-standing concept of the fictional parallel earth for new readers as part of DC Comics' company-wide relaunch "The New 52". One of the revisions introduced by Robinson was making the Green Lantern of Earth 2 gay, which made national news. Robinson left the title after sixteen issues.

In 2013, Robinson launched The Saviors with J. Bone, his first creator-owned series since the discontinuation of Leave It to Chance a decade earlier. In 2014, Marvel published an original graphic novel titled The Amazing Spider-Man: Family Business, co-written by Robinson and Mark Waid. That same year, Robinson's launched two new ongoing series at Marvel as part of the All-New Marvel NOW! initiative, All-New Invaders with artist Steve Pugh and a new volume of the Fantastic Four series with artist Leonard Kirk. In 2015, Robinson and artist Greg Hinkle launched the 4-issue mini-series Airboy at Image, which featured the eponymous Golden Age character emerging from the world of comic books into the "real" world and interacting with the creators. The series caused controversy with its transphobic remarks made by fictional Robinson in issue #2, which propmpted the creators to make amendments for the eventual collected edition. Also in 2015, Robinson penned the ongoing series Scarlet Witch for Marvel, which, he explained, was influenced by the work of Matt Fraction and David Aja on the 2012 series Hawkeye. In 2016, Robinson launched another creator-owned series, Grand Passion, illustrated by Tom Feister and published by Dynamite, which he described as "a departure from what I've been doing in the last few years." The following year, Robinson penned a James Bond spin-off series starring Felix Leiter for Dynamite and returned to DC Comics for a run on the Wonder Woman series, which he wrote for a year, leaving after issue #50 (Sept. 2018).

Since 2020, Robinson has been writing and producing the Stargirl television series, based on the eponymous character co-created by Geoff Johns and Lee Moder that in turn spun out of Robinson-created character Starman (Jack Knight).

== Personal life ==
Born April 1,1963 in Manchester, England and raised in London, Robinson has lived in the United States since 1989. He and DC Comics editor Jann Jones announced their engagement in 2009. They married two years later and have since divorced. He lives Las Vegas, Nevada with his wife Alyson.

== Bibliography ==
=== Early work ===
- London's Dark (with Paul Johnson, graphic novel, 48 pages, Escape, 1989, ISBN 1-85286-157-6)
- Crisis #40: "Murky Waters" (with Tony Salmons, anthology, Fleetway, 1990)
- Shriek #2: "Trial and Error" (with D'Israeli, anthology, FantaCo Enterprises, 1990)
- A1 #4: "Devil's Whisper" (with D'Israeli) and "The Day the General Came" (with Phil Elliott, anthology, Atomeka, 1990)
- Dark Horse:
  - The Terminator:
    - The Terminator Omnibus Volume 1 (tpb, 352 pages, 2008, ISBN 1-59307-916-8) includes:
      - The Terminator: One Shot (with Matt Wagner, graphic novel, 51 pages, 1991, ISBN 1-878574-22-1) also collected in The Terminator: Rewired (tpb, 160 pages, 2004, ISBN 0-7434-9303-6)
      - The Terminator: Secondary Objectives #1–4 (with Paul Gulacy, 1991) also collected as The Terminator: Secondary Objectives (tpb, 112 pages, 1992, ISBN 1-878574-31-0)
        - Script by Robinson from a plot by Mike Richardson and Randy Stradley.
    - The Terminator Omnibus Volume 2 (tpb, 376 pages, 2008, ISBN 1-59307-917-6) includes:
      - The Terminator: Endgame #1–3 (with Butch Guice, 1992) also collected as The Terminator: Endgame (tpb, 80 pages, 1999, ISBN 1-56971-373-1)
  - Grendel Tales: Four Devils, One Hell #1–6 (with Teddy Kristiansen, 1993–1994) collected as Grendel Tales: Four Devils, One Hell (tpb, 196 pages, 1994, ISBN 1-56971-027-9)
- Miracleman: Apocrypha #1: "The Rascal Prince" (with Kelley Jones, anthology, Eclipse, 1991) collected in Miracleman: Apocrypha (hc, 96 pages, 1992, ISBN 1-56060-190-6; tpb, 1992, ISBN 1-56060-189-2)

=== DC Comics ===
- Batman:
  - Batman: Legends of the Dark Knight (anthology):
    - "Blades" (with Tim Sale, in #32–34, 1992) collected in Batman: The Collected Legends of the Dark Knight (tpb, 160 pages, 1994, ISBN 1-56389-147-6)
    - "Werewolf" (with John Watkiss, in #71–73, 1995) collected in Batman: Monsters (tpb, 192 pages, 2009, ISBN 1-4012-2494-6)
    - "Citadel" (with Tony Salmons, in #85, 1996)
    - "I am a Gun" (with Russ Heath, Jr. and Steve Yeowell, in Annual #7, 1997)
    - "A Great Day for Everyone" (with Lee Weeks, co-feature in #100, 1997) collected in Robin: The Teen Wonder (tpb, 160 pages, 2009, ISBN 1-4012-2255-2)
    - "Spook" (with Paul Johnson, in #102–104, 1998)
    - "Playground" (with Dan Brereton, in #114, 1999)
    - "Siege" (dialogue by Robinson over story by Archie Goodwin and art by Marshall Rogers, in #133–136, 2000)
      - Collected in Legends of the Dark Knight: Marshall Rogers (hc, 496 pages, 2011, ISBN 1-4012-3227-2)
      - Collected in Tales of The Batman: Archie Goodwin (hc, 480 pages, 2013, ISBN 1-4012-3829-7)
  - Showcase '94 #1–2: "King Joker" (with Christian Alamy, anthology, 1994)
  - Batman/Deadman: Death and Glory (with John Estes, graphic novel, hc, 96 pages, 1996, ISBN 1-56389-228-6; sc, 1997, ISBN 1-56389-228-6)
  - Detective Comics:
    - "Face the Face" (with Leonard Kirk and Don Kramer, in #817–820 and Batman #651–654, 2006) collected as Batman: Face the Face (tpb, 192 pages, 2006, ISBN 1-4012-0910-6; hc, 2017, ISBN 1-4012-6572-3)
    - "Deface the Face" (with Stephen Segovia and Carmine Di Giandomenico, in #988–993, 2018–2019) collected as Batman: Detective Comics — Deface the Face (tpb, 144 pages, 2019, ISBN 1-4012-9064-7)
- The Golden Age #1–4 (with Paul Smith, Elseworlds, 1993–1994) collected as The Golden Age (tpb, 200 pages, 1995, ISBN 1-56389-203-0; hc, 2017, ISBN 1-4012-6736-X)
- Showcase '93 #9: "Shining Knight" (with Mike Mayhew, anthology, 1993)
- Green Lantern:
  - Green Lantern Corps Quarterly #7: "Green Hell!" (with Kirk Van Wormer, anthology, 1993)
  - Tangent Comics (with J. H. Williams III — series of one-shots set in an alternate universe and published under its own imprint):
    - Tangent Comics: Green Lantern (1997) collected in Tangent Comics Volume 1 (tpb, 208 pages, 2007, ISBN 1-4012-1530-0)
    - Tangent Comics: Tales of the Green Lantern (1998) collected in Tangent Comics Volume 3 (tpb, 208 pages, 2008, ISBN 1-4012-1806-7)
  - Green Lantern 80-Page Giant #1: "Alan Scott in a 1940s Tale" (with Mike Mayhew, anthology, 1998)
- Witchcraft (Vertigo):
  - Witchcraft #1–3 (with Teddy Kristiansen, Peter Snejbjerg (#1), Michael Zulli (#2) and Steve Yeowell (#3), 1994) collected as Witchcraft (tpb, 136 pages, 1996, ISBN 1-56389-274-X)
  - Witchcraft: La Terreur #1–3 (with Michael Zulli, 1998)
- Starman vol. 2 (with Tony Harris, Teddy Kristiansen + Bjarne Hansen + Kim Hagen + Christian Højgaard (#6), Matthew Dow Smith (#11 and 42), John Watkiss (#18), Bret Blevins (Annual #1), J. H. Williams III (Annual #1 and #26), Craig Hamilton (Annual #1 and #28, 54), Guy Davis (#22), Chris Sprouse (#24), Gary Erskine (#26 and 41), Steve Yeowell (#27, 34–35, 47–49), Mark Buckingham (#33–34), Richard Pace (#36), Mitch Byrd (Annual #2), Dusty Abell (#38), Mike Mayhew (#44), Gene Ha (#46), Chris Weston + John McCrea (#55), Stephen Sadowski (#56), Paul Smith (#69) and Russ Heath, Jr. (#74); issues #48–53, 55–60 and 77–79 are co-written by Robinson and David S. Goyer, 1994–2001) collected as:
  - Omnibus Volume 1 (collects #0–16, hc, 448 pages, 2008, ISBN 1-4012-1699-4; tpb, 2012, ISBN 1-4012-1937-3)
  - Omnibus Volume 2 (collects #17–29 and Annual #1, hc, 416 pages, 2009, ISBN 1-4012-2194-7; tpb, 2012, ISBN 1-4012-2195-5)
    - Includes the "Incident in an Old Haunt" short story (art by Wade Von Grawbadger) from Showcase '95 #12 (anthology, 1995)
    - Includes the "Day and Night, Dark and Bright" short serial (art by Matthew Dow Smith) from Showcase '96 #4–5 (anthology, 1996)
  - Omnibus Volume 3 (collects #30–38 and Annual #2, hc, 432 pages, 2009, ISBN 1-4012-2284-6; tpb, cancelled, ISBN 1-4012-6336-4)
    - Includes the 4-issue spin-off limited series The Shade (written by Robinson, art by Gene Ha (#1), J. H. Williams III (#2), Bret Blevins (#3) and Michael Zulli (#4), 1997)
    - Includes the "Talking with Ted, Talking with Jack" (art by Phil Jimenez and Lee Weeks) short story from Starman Secret Files & Origins (one-shot, 1998)
  - Omnibus Volume 4 (collects #39–46, hc, 432 pages, 2010, ISBN 1-4012-2596-9)
    - Includes the Starman: The Mist one-shot (written by Robinson, art by John Lucas, 1998)
    - Includes the Starman 80-Page Giant one-shot (written by Robinson, art by John Lucas, Mike Mayhew, Wade Von Grawbadger, Dusty Abell, Tim Burgard and Stephen Sadowski, 1999)
    - Includes the 2-issue crossover limited series Batman/Hellboy/Starman (written by Robinson, art by Mike Mignola, 1999)
  - Omnibus Volume 5 (collects #1,000,000 and 47–60, hc, 464 pages, 2010, ISBN 1-4012-2889-5)
    - Includes "The Ropes" short story (co-written by Robinson and David S. Goyer, art by Dave Ross) from All Star Comics 80-Page Giant (one-shot, 1999)
    - Includes Stars and S.T.R.I.P.E. #0 (co-written by Robinson and Geoff Johns, art by Lee Moder and Chris Weston, 1999)
    - Includes the "Starman, FBI Agent" short story from JSA: All Stars #4 (written by Robinson, art by Tony Harris, 2003)
  - Omnibus Volume 6 (collects #61–80, hc, 544 pages, 2011, ISBN 1-4012-3044-X)
    - Includes the "81th issue" of Starman (written by Robinson, art by Fernando Dagnino, 2010) released as a tie-in to the "Blackest Night" crossover storyline.
- Vigilante: City Lights, Prairie Justice #1–4 (with Tony Salmons, 1995–1996) collected as Vigilante: City Lights, Prairie Justice (tpb, 144 pages, 2009, ISBN 1-4012-2128-9)
- Superman:
  - Legends of the DC Universe #1–3: "U.L.T.R.A. Humanite" (with Val Semeiks, anthology, 1998)
  - Superman (with Renato Guedes, Jesús Merino (#684), Javier Pina, Pablo Raimondi (#685), Pere Pérez (#690), Fernando Dagnino (#692–693) and Bernard Chang, 2008–2010) collected as:
    - The Coming of Atlas (collects #677–680, hc, 128 pages, 2009, ISBN 1-4012-2131-9; tpb, 2010, ISBN 1-4012-2132-7)
    - New Krypton Volume 1 (includes #681, hc, 176 pages, 2009, ISBN 1-4012-2329-X; tpb, 2010, ISBN 1-4012-2330-3)
      - Also collects Superman's Pal Jimmy Olsen Special #1 (written by Robinson, art by Jesús Merino, Leno Carvalho and Steve Scott, 2008)
      - Also collects Superman: New Krypton Special (co-written by Robinson, Sterling Gates and Geoff Johns, art by Gary Frank, Pete Woods, and Renato Guedes, 2008)
      - Also collects Adventure Comics Special (Featuring the Guardian) (written by Robinson, art by Pere Pérez, 2009)
    - New Krypton Volume 2 (includes #682–683, hc, 160 pages, 2009, ISBN 1-4012-2319-2; tpb, 2010, ISBN 1-4012-2320-6)
    - Mon-El Volume 1 (collects #684–690, hc, 224 pages, 2010, ISBN 1-4012-2634-5; tpb, 2011, ISBN 1-4012-2635-3)
      - Includes Action Comics #874 (written by Robinson, art by Pablo Raimondi and Renato Guedes, 2009)
    - Codename Patriot (includes #691, hc, 144 pages, 2010, ISBN 1-4012-2658-2; tpb, 2011, ISBN 1-4012-2657-4)
      - Also collects Superman: World of New Krypton #6 (co-written by Robinson and Greg Rucka, art by Pete Woods, 2009)
      - Also collects Action Comics #880 (co-written by Robinson and Greg Rucka, art by Julian López, 2009)
      - Also collects Superman's Pal Jimmy Olsen Special #2 (written by Robinson, art by Bernard Chang, 2009)
    - Mon-El Volume 2 (collects #692–697 and Annual #14, hc, 128 pages, 2010, ISBN 1-4012-2937-9; tpb, 2011, ISBN 1-4012-2938-7)
      - Includes the "Man of Valor, Finale" short story (art by Bernard Chang) from Adventure Comics vol. 2 #11 (anthology, 2010)
  - Superman: World of New Krypton (co-written by Robinson and Greg Rucka, art by Pete Woods, 2009–2010) collected as:
    - Superman: New Krypton Volume 3 (collects #1–5, hc, 144 pages, 2010, ISBN 1-4012-2636-1; tpb, 2011, ISBN 1-4012-2637-X)
    - Superman: New Krypton Volume 4 (collects #6–12, hc, 192 pages, 2010, ISBN 1-4012-2774-0; tpb, 2011, ISBN 1-4012-2775-9)
  - Superman Secret Files 2009: "Double Act" (with Matt Camp) and "Legacy" (with Stefano Gaudiano, co-features in one-shot, 2009)
  - Blackest Night: Superman #1–3 (with Eddy Barrows, 2009)
    - Collected in Blackest Night: Black Lantern Corps Volume 1 (hc, 256 pages, 2010, ISBN 1-4012-2784-8; tpb, 2011, ISBN 1-4012-2804-6)
    - Collected in Blackest Night Omnibus (hc, 1,664 pages, 2019, ISBN 1-4012-9119-8)
  - Superman: Last Stand of New Krypton:
    - Volume 1 (hc, 168 pages, 2010, ISBN 1-4012-2932-8; tpb, 2011, ISBN 1-4012-2933-6) includes:
      - "Prologue, Part Two: The Future is Now" (with Julian López, in Adventure Comics vol. 2 #8, anthology, 2010)
      - "Part One: Invaded" (co-written by Robinson and Sterling Gates, art by Pete Woods, in #1, 2010)
      - "Part Three: Destiny" (with Javier Pina and Bernard Chang, in Superman #698, 2010)
      - "Part Four: Namesake" (with Travis Moore, in Adventure Comics vol. 2 #9, anthology, 2010)
      - "Part Five: Bottles and Battles" (co-written by Robinson and Sterling Gates, art by Travis Moore and Pete Woods, in #2, 2010)
    - Volume 2 (hc, 128 pages, 2011, ISBN 1-4012-3036-9; tpb, 2012, ISBN 1-4012-3037-7) includes:
      - "Part Six: Divided, Conquerable" (co-written by Robinson and Sterling Gates, art by Travis Moore and Eduardo Pansica, in Adventure Comics vol. 2 #10, anthology, 2010)
      - "Part Eight: Irony in Ire" (with Bernard Chang, in Superman #699, 2010)
      - "Part Nine: This is the Way the World Ends" (co-written by Robinson and Sterling Gates, art by Pete Woods, in #3, 2010)
  - Superman: War of the Supermen (hc, 144 pages, 2010, ISBN 1-4012-2967-0; tpb, 2012, ISBN 1-4012-3187-X) collects:
    - Superman: War of the Supermen #0–4 (co-written by Robinson and Sterling Gates, art by Eddy Barrows, Jamal Igle, CAFU and Eduardo Pansica, 2010)
    - Superman #700: "The Comeback" (with Bernard Chang, co-feature, 2010)
  - Superman/Batman Annual #5: "Reign of Doomsday, Part Five" (with Miguel Sepulveda, 2011) collected in Superman: Return of Doomsday (tpb, 144 pages, 2011, ISBN 1-4012-3253-1)
  - Superman vol. 4 #40–41: "The Last Days" (with Doug Mahnke and Ed Benes, 2018)
    - Collected in Superman: Imperius Lex (tpb, 168 pages, 2018, ISBN 1-4012-8123-0)
    - Collected in Superman Rebirth: The Deluxe Edition Book Four (hc, 280 pages, 2019, ISBN 1-4012-8935-5)
- Legends of the DC Universe 80-Page Giant #1: "Lights, Camera and Too Much Action" (with Dave Gibbons, anthology, 1998)
- Justice Society of America:
  - JSA (co-written by Robinson and David S. Goyer):
    - The Justice Society Returns (tpb, 256 pages, 2003, ISBN 1-4012-0090-7) includes:
      - All Star Comics vol. 2 #1–2 (with Michael Lark (#1) and Will Rosado (#2), 1999)
      - Adventure Comics (with Peter Snejbjerg, one-shot, 1999)
      - Sensation Comics (with Scott Benefiel, one-shot, 1999)
    - JSA by Geoff Johns Book One (tpb, 392 pages, 2017, ISBN 1-4012-7490-0) includes:
      - JSA Secret Files & Origins #1: "Gathering Storm" (with Scott Benefiel, co-feature, 1999)
      - JSA #1–5 (with Scott Benefiel and Derec Aucoin (#5), 1999)
    - All of the issues listed above are also collected in JSA Omnibus Volume 1 (hc, 1,224 pages, 2014, ISBN 1-4012-4761-X)
  - Justice Society of America 80-Page Giant: "Memory Lane" (with Neil Edwards, anthology one-shot, 2010)
  - Blackest Night: JSA #1–3 (with Marcos Marz, Eddy Barrows and Eduardo Pansica (#3); issues #2–3 are co-written by Robinson and Tony Bedard, 2010)
    - Collected in Blackest Night: Black Lantern Corps Volume 2 (hc, 240 pages, 2010, ISBN 1-4012-2785-6; tpb, 2011, ISBN 1-4012-2803-8)
    - Collected in Blackest Night Omnibus (hc, 1,664 pages, 2019, ISBN 1-4012-9119-8)
- Hawkman #1–7, 9–10 (co-written by Robinson and Geoff Johns (except for issue #7, written by Robinson solo), art by Rags Morales, 2002–2003)
  - Collected in Hawkman Omnibus Volume 1 (hc, 688 pages, 2012, ISBN 1-4012-3222-1)
  - Collected in Hawkman by Geoff Johns Book One (tpb, 376 pages, 2017, ISBN 1-4012-7290-8)
- Action Comics #879–889: "Captain Atom" (script by Robinson from a plot by Robinson and Greg Rucka, art by CAFU, co-feature, 2009–2010)
- Justice League of America:
  - Justice League: Cry for Justice #1–7 (with Mauro Cascioli, Scott Clark (#5–7) and Ibraim Roberson (#7), 2009–2010) collected as Justice League: Cry for Justice (hc, 232 pages, 2010, ISBN 1-4012-2567-5; tpb, 2011, ISBN 1-4012-2564-0)
  - Justice League of America vol. 2 (with Mark Bagley, Robson Rocha + Pow Rodrix (#49), Brett Booth (#54–57), Miguel Sepulveda (#58) and Daniel Sampere (#58–60), 2009–2011) collected as:
    - Team History (collects #38–43, hc, 192 pages, 2010, ISBN 1-4012-2838-0; tpb, 2011, ISBN 1-4012-3260-4)
    - Dark Things (collects #44–48, hc, 192 pages, 2011, ISBN 1-4012-3011-3; tpb, 2012, ISBN 1-4012-3193-4)
      - Includes Justice Society of America vol. 3 #41–42 (written by Robinson, art by Mark Bagley, 2010) as part of the "Dark Things" inter-title crossover.
      - The Cyborg/Red Tornado co-feature from Justice League of America vol. 2 #46–48 (written by Robinson, art by Pow Rodrix, 2010) remains uncollected.
    - Omega (collects #49–53 and the Starman/Congorilla one-shot, hc, 200 pages, 2011, ISBN 1-4012-3243-4; tpb, 2012, ISBN 1-4012-3356-2)
    - The Rise of Eclipso (collects #54–60, tpb, 192 pages, 2012, ISBN 1-4012-3413-5)
      - Includes Justice Society of America vol. 3 #43 (written by Robinson, art by Jesús Merino, 2010)
- Flashpoint: The Outsider #1–3 (with Javi Fernandez, 2011) collected in Flashpoint: The World of Flashpoint Featuring Wonder Woman (tpb, 272 pages, 2012, ISBN 1-4012-3410-0)
- The Shade vol. 2 #1–12 (with Cully Hamner (#1–3), Darwyn Cooke (#4), Javier Pulido (#5–7), Jill Thompson (#8), Frazer Irving (#9–11) and Gene Ha (#12), 2011–2012) collected as The Shade (tpb, 280 pages, 2013, ISBN 1-4012-3782-7)
- Men of War vol. 2 #7: "Remembering the Leopard" (with Phil Winslade, 2012) collected in Men of War: Uneasy Company (tpb, 256 pages, 2012, ISBN 1-4012-3499-2)
- DC Universe Presents #9–11: "Savage" (with Bernard Chang, anthology, 2012) collected in DC Universe Presents: Vandal Savage (tpb, 160 pages, 2013, ISBN 1-4012-4076-3)
- Earth 2 (with Nicola Scott, Eduardo Pansica (#4), Yıldıray Çınar (#7–8, 13), Tomás Giorello (#0) and Julius Gopez + CAFU (Annual #1), 2012–2013) collected as:
  - The Gathering (collects #1–6, hc, 160 pages, 2013, ISBN 1-4012-3774-6; tpb, 2012, ISBN 1-4012-4281-2)
  - The Tower of Fate (collects #0, 7–12, hc, 176 pages, 2013, ISBN 1-4012-4311-8; tpb, 2014, ISBN 1-4012-4614-1)
    - Includes the Mister Terrific short story (art by Tom Derenick) from DC Universe Presents #0 (anthology, 2012)
  - Battle Cry (collects #13–16 and Annual #1, hc, 160 pages, 2014, ISBN 1-4012-4615-X; tpb, 2014, ISBN 1-4012-4938-8)
- He-Man and the Masters of the Universe #1–2 (of 6) (with Philip Tan and Howard Porter (#2); issue #2 is co-written by Robinson and Keith Giffen, 2012) collected in He-Man and the Masters of the Universe Volume 1 (tpb, 160 pages, 2013, ISBN 1-4012-4022-4)
- Wonder Woman vol. 5 (with Carlo Pagulayan (#31, 36–37), Sergio Davila (#32 and 34), Emanuela Lupacchino, Stephen Segovia (#37, 41, 46–47), Carmen Carnero (#39–40), Jesús Merino (#42, 48–50) and Marco Santucci (#43 and 45), 2017–2018) collected as:
  - Children of the Gods (collects #31–37, tpb, 168 pages, 2018, ISBN 1-4012-8424-8)
  - Amazons Attacked (collects #38–45, tpb, 192 pages, 2018, ISBN 1-4012-8534-1)
  - Dark Gods (collects #46–50 and Annual #2, tpb, 168 pages, 2019, ISBN 1-4012-8901-0)
- Trinity vol. 2 #17–22 (with Patrick Zircher, Jack Herbert (#19–20) and Tyler Kirkham (#20–21), 2018) collected as Trinity: The Search for Steve Trevor (tpb, 144 pages, 2018, ISBN 1-4012-8550-3)
- Young Monsters in Love: "Dear Velcoro" (with John McCrea, anthology one-shot, 2018) collected in A Very DC Valentine's Day (tpb, 176 pages, 2019, ISBN 1-4012-8766-2)
- Earth-Prime #4: "Road Trip" (with Jerry Ordway, anthology, 2022) collected in Earth-Prime (tpb, 240 pages, 2023, ISBN 1-77951-829-3)

=== Marvel Comics ===
- 67 Seconds (with Steve Yeowell, graphic novel, 64 pages, Epic, 1992, ISBN 0-87135-864-6)
- The Incredible Hulk Annual #18: "The Running Man" (with Joe Phillips, co-feature, 1992)
  - Collected in The Incredible Hulk: Ghost of the Past (tpb, 480 pages, 2015, ISBN 0-7851-9299-9)
  - Collected in The Incredible Hulk by Peter David Omnibus Volume 2 (hc, 1,048 pages, 2020, ISBN 1-302-92727-2)
- Clive Barker's Ectokid (with Steve Skroce, Razorline):
  - Razorline: The First Cut: "Ectokid" (anthology one-shot, 1993)
  - Ectokid #1–3 (with issue #3 co-written by Robinson and Lana Wachowski, 1993)
- Captain America:
  - Marvel Select: Tales of Suspense (with Colin MacNeil, one-shot, 1995) collected in The Avengers: Tales to Astonish (tpb, 224 pages, 2018, ISBN 1-302-90804-9)
  - Captain America vol. 2 #7–11 (with Joe Phillips (#7) and Joe Bennett, 1997) collected in Heroes Reborn: Captain America (tpb, 352 pages, 2006, ISBN 0-7851-2339-3)
    - In addition to this short run, Robinson also wrote the "World War III" storyline published throughout the last issues of the series that were part of the "Heroes Reborn" relaunch:
      - Fantastic Four vol. 2 #13: "Part One: Life in Wartime" (with Mike Wieringo, 1997)
      - The Avengers vol. 2 #13: "Part Two: Winning and Losing" (with Michael Ryan, 1997)
      - Iron Man vol. 2 #13: "Part Three: No Time to Mourn!" (with Larry Stroman, 1997)
      - Captain America vol. 2 #13: "Part Four: War without End..." (with Ron Lim, 1997)
    - The storyline — a crossover between Marvel and Wildstorm characters — remains uncollected.
  - Captain America Comics 70th Anniversary Special: "What Makes the Man" (with Marcos Martín, 2009) collected in Timely 70th Anniversary Collection (hc, 280 pages, 2010, ISBN 0-7851-3899-4)
- Cable:
  - Cable #44–50, -1 (with Randy Green (#44–46), Allen Im (#44), José Ladrönn (#-1 and 48–50), N. Steven Harris (#46) and Rob Haynes (#47), 1997–1998)
    - Issues #45–47 are collected in X-Men: Operation Zero Tolerance (tpb, 432 pages, 2001, ISBN 0-7851-0738-X; hc, 640 pages, 2012, ISBN 0-7851-6240-2)
    - Issues #-1 and 48–50 are collected in Cable: The Hellfire Hunt (tpb, 448 pages, 2017, ISBN 1-302-90785-9)
  - Cable vol. 3 #1–5 (with Carlos Pacheco and Yıldıray Çınar (#4–5), 2017) collected as Cable: Conquest (tpb, 112 pages, 2017, ISBN 1-302-90482-5)
- Generation X:
  - Generation X #-1 and 29–31 (with Chris Bachalo and Pop Mhan (#29), 1997) collected in Generation X: The Secret of M (tpb, 480 pages, 2023, ISBN 1-302-95173-4)
  - Generation X/Gen^{13} (with Salvador Larroca, one-shot, 1998)
- All-New Invaders (with Steve Pugh, Marc Laming (#6–7, 12) and Barry Kitson (#12), 2014–2015) collected as:
  - Gods and Soldiers (collects #1–5, tpb, 128 pages, 2014, ISBN 0-7851-8914-9)
    - Includes the "To Tame the Very Gods Themselves" short story (art by Steve Pugh) from All-New Marvel NOW! Point One (anthology one-shot, 2014)
  - Original Sin (collects #6–10, tpb, 112 pages, 2014, ISBN 0-7851-8915-7)
  - The Martians are Coming (collects #11–15, tpb, 112 pages, 2015, ISBN 0-7851-9247-6)
- Fantastic Four vol. 5 (with Leonard Kirk, Dean Haspiel (#6–7), Marc Laming (#9–10, 14) and Tom Grummett (Annual #1), 2014–2015) collected as:
  - The Fall of the Fantastic Four (collects #1–5, tpb, 128 pages, 2014, ISBN 0-7851-5474-4)
  - Original Sin (collects #6–10, tpb, 112 pages, 2014, ISBN 0-7851-5475-2)
  - Back in Blue (collects #11–14 and Annual #1, tpb, 120 pages, 2015, ISBN 0-7851-9220-4)
  - The End is Fourever (collects #642–645, tpb, 144 pages, 2015, ISBN 0-7851-9744-3)
    - Includes the "Anniversary" short story (art by Chris Samnee) from Marvel 75th Anniversary Celebration (anthology one-shot, 2014)
- Original Sins #4: "Checkmate" (with Alex Maleev, anthology, 2014)
  - Collected in Original Sin (hc, 392 pages, 2014, ISBN 0-7851-9069-4)
  - Collected in Original Sins (tpb, 144 pages, 2015, ISBN 0-7851-9151-8)
- The Amazing Spider-Man: Family Business (co-written by Robinson and Mark Waid, art by Gabriele Dell'Otto and Werther Dell'Edera, graphic novel, hc, 112 pages, 2014, ISBN 0-7851-8440-6; sc, 2018, ISBN 0-7851-8441-4)
- Secret Wars: Age of Ultron vs. Marvel Zombies #1–4 (with Steve Pugh and other artists, 2015) collected as Secret Wars — Battleworld: Age of Ultron vs. Marvel Zombies (tpb, 128 pages, 2015, ISBN 0-7851-9863-6)
- Secret Wars: Armor Wars #½ (with Mark Bagley) and 1–5 (with Marcio Takara, 2015) collected as Secret Wars — Warzones: Armor Wars (tpb, 112 pages, 2016, ISBN 0-7851-9864-4)
- Uncanny Avengers vol. 3 Annual #1 (with Marc Laming, 2016)
- Squadron Supreme vol. 4 (with Leonard Kirk, Paolo Villanelli (#6–8, 14), Aco + Leonardo Romero (#9) and Emilio Laiso (#15), 2016–2017) collected as:
  - By Any Means Necessary! (collects #1–5, tpb, 128 pages, 2016, ISBN 0-7851-9971-3)
    - Includes the "Supremacy" short story (art by Leonard Kirk) from The Avengers vol. 6 #0 (2015)
  - Civil War II (collects #6–9, tpb, 112 pages, 2016, ISBN 0-7851-9972-1)
  - Finding Namor (collects #10–15, tpb, 136 pages, 2017, ISBN 1-302-90285-7)
- Scarlet Witch vol. 2 (with Vanesa del Rey (#1 and 15), Marco Rudy (#2), Steve Dillon + Chris Visions (#3–4), Javier Pulido (#5), Marguerite Sauvage (#6), Annie Wu (#7), Tula Lotay (#8), Joëlle Jones (#9), Kei Zama (#10), Leila del Duca (#11), Annapaola Martello (#12), Jonathan Marks (#13) and Shawn Crystal (#14), 2016–2017) collected as:
  - Witches' Road (collects #1–5, tpb, 112 pages, 2016, ISBN 0-7851-9682-X)
  - World of Witchcraft (collects #6–10, tpb, 112 pages, 2017, ISBN 0-7851-9683-8)
    - Includes "The Wu" short story (art by Mike Perkins) from Doctor Strange: Last Days of Magic (anthology one-shot, 2016)
  - The Final Hex (collects #11–15, tpb, 112 pages, 2017, ISBN 1-302-90266-0)
  - Scarlet Witch by James Robinson: The Complete Collection (collects #1–15 and the short story from the Doctor Strange: Last Days of Magic one-shot, tpb, 344 pages, 2021, ISBN 1-302-92738-8)
- Star Wars Special: C-3PO: "The Phantom Limb" (with Tony Harris, 2016) collected in Journey to Star Wars: The Force Awakens — Shattered Empire (hc, 144 pages, 2016, ISBN 1-302-90210-5)
- Nick Fury #1–6 (with Aco, 2017) collected as Nick Fury: Deep-Cover Capers (tpb, 136 pages, 2017, ISBN 1-302-90486-8)

=== Image Comics ===
- Wildstorm:
  - James Robinson's Complete WildC.A.T.s (tpb, 288 pages, 2009, ISBN 1-4012-2204-8) collects:
    - WildC.A.T.s #15–20 (with Travis Charest, Terry Dodson (#18–19) and Jim Lee (#19), 1994–1995)
      - WildC.A.T.s Annual #1 (with Larry Stroman, 1998)
      - WildC.A.T.s #50: "Old Feelings" (with Jim Lee, co-feature, 1998)
    - Team One: WildC.A.T.s #1–2 (with Rich Johnson, 1995)
  - Wildstorm Rising (tpb, 256 pages, 1999, ISBN 1-56389-588-9) includes:
    - Wildstorm Rising #1 (of 2) (with Barry Windsor-Smith, 1995)
    - Union #4 (with Ryan Benjamin, 1995)
  - Leave It to Chance #1–13 (with Paul Smith, Homage, 1996–2002) partially collected in:
    - Shaman's Rain (collects #1–4, tpb, 112 pages, 1998, ISBN 1-56389-586-2; hc, 2002, ISBN 1-58240-253-1)
    - Trick or Threat (collects #5–8, tpb, 112 pages, 1998, ISBN 1-56389-559-5; hc, 2003, ISBN 1-58240-278-7)
    - Monster Madness and Other Stories (collects #9–11, hc, 112 pages, 2003, ISBN 1-58240-298-1)
  - Gen^{13} Bootleg #7: "Renaissance Ruckus" (with Scott Hampton, 1997)
  - WildC.A.T.s/X-Men: The Modern Age (with Adam Hughes, one-shot, 1997) collected in WildC.A.T.s/X-Men (tpb, 194 pages, 1998, ISBN 1-58240-022-9)
- The Saviors (tpb, 136 pages, 2016, ISBN 1-63215-925-2) collects:
  - Liberty Annual '12: "Hunters" (with J. Bone, anthology, 2012) also collected in CBLDF Presents: Liberty (hc, 216 pages, 2014, ISBN 1-60706-937-7; tpb, 2016, ISBN 1-60706-996-2)
  - The Saviors #1–5 (with J. Bone, 2013–2014)
- Heaven (with Philip Tan, unreleased ongoing series — initially announced for 2015)
- Airboy vol. 2 #1–4 (with Greg Hinkle, 2015) collected as Airboy (hc, 120 pages, 2016, ISBN 1-63215-543-5)
- Where We Live: A Benefit for the Survivors in Las Vegas: "The Deadliest Man" (with Dean Kotz and Stefano Gaudiano, anthology graphic novel, 336 pages, 2018, ISBN 1-5343-0822-9)
- The Terrible Elisabeth Dumn Against the Devils in Suits (translated and adapted from Portuguese by Robinson; written and drawn by Arabson Assis, one-shot, 2018)

=== Other publishers ===
- Firearm (Malibu):
  - Firearm #1–18 (with Cully Hamner, Tim Eldred (#4), Kirk Van Wormer (#5 and 7), Bill Knapp (#8), Gary Erskine (#10–11), Ben Herrera (#12), Steve Carr (#13), Brian O'Connell (#14), Mike Edsey, (#15) Arnie Jorgensen (#16 and 18) and Keith Conroy (#17–18), 1993–1995)
    - In 1993, Malibu released the Firearm #0 package consisting of a VHS cassette with the 35-minute Firearm film and the Firearm #0 comic book (written by Robinson, drawn by Mike Wieringo and Rob Haynes) featuring the conclusion of the short film's story.
    - During the series' run, Robinson penned a short Firearm story and co-plotted a crossover issue, both of which were published as part of The Night Man ongoing series:
      - "Firearm Origin" (with Howard Chaykin, co-feature in #4, 1994)
      - "Crossfire!" (script by Steve Englehart from a plot by Robinson and Englehart, drawn by Dean Zachary, in #14, 1994)
  - Codename: Firearm #0–2: "Idle Thoughts" (with Keith Conroy + Cully Hamner (#1) and Gary Erskine (#2–3), co-feature, 1995)
- Bluebeard #1–3 (with Phil Elliott, Slave Labor Graphics, 1993–1994)
- Illegal Alien (with Phil Elliott, graphic novel, 80 pages, Kitchen Sink, 1994, ISBN 0-87816-297-6)
- Bart Simpson's Treehouse of Horror #1: "Bart People" (with Chris Roman, anthology, Bongo, 1995)
  - Collected in Treehouse of Horror: Heebie-Jeebie Hullabaloo (tpb, 144 pages, HarperCollins, 1999, ISBN 0-00-257118-8)
  - Collected in The Simpsons: Treehouse of Horror Ominous Omnibus Volume 2 (hc, 400 pages, Abrams ComicArts, 2023, ISBN 1-4197-6351-2)
- Vampirella Masters Series Volume 6: James Robinson (tpb, 112 pages, Dynamite, 2011, ISBN 1-60690-250-4) collects:
  - Vampirella 25th Anniversary Special: "Two So Different" (with Ray Lago, anthology, Harris, 1996)
  - Vampirella: Blood Lust #1–2 (with Joe Jusko, Harris, 1997)
    - Robinson and Jusko produced an epilogue that was first published in the limited edition slipcased hardcover collection of the series.
    - The series, along with the epilogue, was also collected as Vampirella: Blood Lust (tpb, 72 pages, Harris, 2006, ISBN 0-910692-88-2)
  - Vampirella/Dracula: The Centennial: "Vampirella vs. Dracula" (with David Mack and Rick Mays, anthology one-shot, Harris, 1997)
- Ash (with Joe Quesada, Event):
  - Ash #½ (first six pages, Wizard, 1997)
  - Ash: Fire and Crossfire #1–2 (1999)
- Dynamite:
  - Grand Passion #1–5 (with Tom Feister and Andrea Mutti (#5), 2016–2017) collected as Grand Passion (tpb, 120 pages, 2017, ISBN 1-5241-0391-8)
  - James Bond: Felix Leiter #1–6 (with Aaron Campbell, 2017) collected as James Bond: Felix Leiter (hc, 152 pages, 2017, ISBN 1-5241-0470-1; tpb, 2019, ISBN 1-5241-1265-8)
- Love is Love (untitled two-page story, with Sagar Forniés, anthology graphic novel, 144 pages, IDW Publishing, 2016, ISBN 1-63140-939-5)
- 2000 AD #2050: "A Soldier's Duty" (with Leonardo Manco, anthology, Rebellion, 2017)
- The Adventures of Lumen N. #1-4 (with Phil Hester and Marc Deering, Dark Horse, 2025, ISBN 978-1506747897)

== Filmography ==
- Firearm (writer, 1993)
- Cyber Bandits (writer, 1995)
- Comic Book Villains (writer and director, 2002)
- The League of Extraordinary Gentlemen (writer, 2003)
- Son of Batman ("story by", 2014)

Preceded by Chris Claremont	WildC.A.T.s writer 1994–1995	Succeeded by Alan Moore
Preceded by Rob Liefeld; Jeph Loeb	Captain America writer 1997	Succeeded by Mark Waid
Preceded by Todd Dezago	Cable writer 1997–1998	Succeeded by Joe Casey
Preceded by Len Strazewski (Justice Society of America vol. 2)	JSA writer 1999 (with David S. Goyer)	Succeeded by Geoff Johns; David S. Goyer
Preceded by William Messner-Loebs	Hawkman writer 2002–2003 (with Geoff Johns)	Succeeded by Geoff Johns
Preceded by Judd Winick	Batman writer 2006	Succeeded by Grant Morrison
Preceded by David Lapham	Detective Comics writer 2006	Succeeded by Paul Dini
Preceded by Kurt Busiek	Superman writer 2008–2010	Succeeded by J. Michael Straczynski
Preceded by Dwayne McDuffie	Justice League of America writer 2009–2011	Succeeded by Geoff Johns
Preceded by n/a	Earth 2 writer 2012–2013	Succeeded by Tom Taylor
Preceded by Matt Fraction; Karl Kesel	Fantastic Four writer 2014–2015	Succeeded by Dan Slott
Preceded by Duane Swierczynski	Cable writer 2017	Succeeded by Ed Brisson
Preceded by Shea Fontana	Wonder Woman writer 2017–2018	Succeeded by Steve Orlando
Preceded by Rob Williams	Trinity writer 2018	Succeeded by n/a
Preceded by Bryan Edward Hill	Detective Comics writer 2018–2019	Succeeded by Peter Tomasi
