= Ventriloquist (character) =

Publication information
- Publisher: DC Comics
- First appearance: Wesker: Detective Comics #584 (February 1988); Riley: Detective Comics #827 (March 2007); Belzer: Batgirl #20 (July 2013)
- Created by: Wesker: John Wagner (writer); Alan Grant (writer); Norm Breyfogle (artist); Riley: Paul Dini (writer); Don Kramer (artist); Belzer: Gail Simone (writer); Fernando Pasarin (artist)

In-story information
- Alter ego: Arnold Wesker; Peyton Riley; Shauna Belzer
- Species: Human
- Team affiliations: Wesker: Secret Society of Super Villains; Black Lantern Corps; Justice League of Arkham
- Abilities: Criminal mastermind; Skilled marksman; Skilled polyphonist

The Ventriloquist is the name of multiple supervillains appearing in American comic books and other media published by DC Comics. All of the Ventriloquist's versions are enemies of Batman, belonging to the collective of adversaries that make up Batman's rogues' gallery.

The character has been featured in various media adaptations, such as feature films, television series and video games. Real-life ventriloquist Andrew Sellon portrays a new version of the character in the television series Gotham. In the fifth season, he finds the dummy Scarface and becomes the Ventriloquist.

== Publication history ==
There are currently three incarnations of the Ventriloquist: the first and original incarnation, Arnold Wesker, first appeared in Detective Comics #583 (February 1988) and was created by John Wagner, Alan Grant, and Norm Breyfogle; the second Ventriloquist, Peyton Riley, was introduced in Detective Comics #827 (March 2007) by Paul Dini and Don Kramer; in September 2011, The New 52 rebooted DC's continuity and, in this new timeline, the third and final incarnation of the character was introduced, Shauna Belzer, first appearing in Batgirl #20 (July 2013), as created by Gail Simone and Fernando Pasarin.

== Fictional character biography ==
=== Arnold Wesker ===
Arnold Wesker as the original Ventriloquist of Scarface, as appeared on a splash page of Batman #475 (January 1992). Art by the character's co-creator Norm Breyfogle.

A meek, quiet man named Arnold Wesker (the first Ventriloquist) plans and executes his crimes through a dummy named Scarface, with the dress and persona of a 1920s gangster (complete with pinstripe suit, cigar, and Tommy gun). His name comes from the nickname of Al Capone, after whom Scarface is modeled. Born into a powerful organized crime family, Wesker develops dissociative identity disorder after seeing his mother assassinated by thugs from a rival family. Growing up, his only outlet is ventriloquism. A running joke for the character is having Scarface replace the letter "B" with "G," constantly referring to "Batman" as "Gatman." This is in reference to the difficulty of pronouncing the letter "B" in ventriloquism, and gives the appearance of a speech impediment.

Showcase '94 #8-9 establishes an alternate supernatural origin story: after a barroom brawl in which he kills someone during a violent release of his repressed anger, Wesker is sent to Blackgate Penitentiary. He is introduced to "Woody" — a dummy carved from the remains of the former Blackgate gallows by his cellmate Donnegan — who convinces him to escape and kill Donnegan in a fight which scars the dummy, thus resulting in the birth of Scarface. Wesker lets the Scarface alter do dirty work, including robbery and murder. He is totally dominated by Scarface, who commands and abuses him. Batman/Scarface: A Psychodrama (2001) reinforces this version and shows the dummy to be indirectly responsible for two accidents while separated from Wesker (with at least one fatality). The dummy also retained his speech impediment while operated by a young boy and seemed to even show awareness of his name during this period.

The Ventriloquist is one of many villains in Batman's rogues gallery to be confined to Arkham Asylum when Batman apprehends him. In Knightfall, Arkham is destroyed by Bane and the Ventriloquist is among the inmates who escape. Unable to find Scarface, the Ventriloquist briefly uses a sock puppet named Socko in his place. Ventriloquist procures a number of other hand puppets to fill in for Scarface, including one of a police officer which he refers to as Chief O'Hara. Later, when Wesker finds Scarface, the dummy and Socko are set at odds until a standoff occurs. Scarface and the puppet both shoot each other, leaving Wesker unconscious and injured.

In Batman: Cataclysm, Gotham City is devastated by an earthquake. The stress caused by the earthquake apparently triggers the release of another personality within Wesker named the Quakemaster, who claims to have caused the earthquake himself and threatens to trigger another unless he is paid $100 million. Robin deduces Quakemaster's identity due to him taking great effort to avoid saying any words containing the letter "B".

In Detective Comics #818, an issue later included in the trade paperback Batman: Face the Face, an unseen assailant murders Wesker. The dummy Scarface is stepped on and its head crushed. The dying Wesker uses Scarface's hand to leave a clue regarding his murder: a street name. Later in the storyline, it is revealed that Tally Man, acting as an enforcer for Great White Shark, was responsible for the murder. During the Blackest Night crossover, Wesker is reanimated as a Black Lantern. Wesker returned following The New 52 relaunch, which rebooted the continuity of the DC universe.

=== Peyton Riley ===
The second Ventriloquist (Peyton Riley). Interior art of Detective Comics #827 (March 2007), art by Don Kramer.

A new female Ventriloquist, called "Sugar" by Scarface, debuts in the pages of Detective Comics. Sugar is a more compatible partner than Wesker, since Scarface no longer substitutes the letter "B" with "G", and she is far more willing to commit violent crime. Riley owns multiple Scarface dummies and often uses them as explosives.

Scarface kidnaps a rival gangster, Johnny Sabatino, and takes Bruce Wayne hostage. While alone, Sugar breaks away from Scarface and talks to Bruce in what appears to be her real personality. She reveals that she was engaged to Wayne's friend, Matthew Atkins, years prior. Her real name is revealed to be Peyton Riley, and she expresses remorse for her crimes before the Scarface persona reappears and interrupts their conversation. In the following issue, Riley reveals that her father, an Irish Mafia boss named Sean Riley, forced her to marry Sabatino to form an alliance between Gotham's Irish and Italian gangs. Riley and Sabatino are taken to see Arnold Wesker, who is impressed by Riley's intelligence and gives Sabatino a second chance, taking 30% of his profits.

Riley and Hush bond over the mutual resentment of their families, and vow that they will escape together when Hush comes into his fortune. However, Hush's ailing mother does not approve of their relationship, and when he refuses to stop seeing Riley, she writes him out of her will. Riley subsequently runs the departing family lawyer off of the road and kills him while Hush murders his mother. Riley declares that they can finally be free together, only to be abandoned by Hush.

When Scarface's hold on the mob begins to crumble, Sabatino decides to cement his own position by wiping out the Riley family. After killing his father-in-law, he shoots Peyton in the head. She survives and swears revenge on Sabatino. Peyton attempts to throw Sabatino over the side of his yacht, but he begins to strangle her with rope. Scarface quietly says, "Jump, Sugar", and Riley sends them both over the side. Riley has not appeared since then and is presumed to have drowned.

=== Shauna Belzer ===
A new Ventriloquist debuted in the pages of Batgirl, part of The New 52 continuity reboot. Shauna Belzer grew up in the shadow of her twin brother Ferdie, whom their parents treated as a favorite while ignoring her; other children, meanwhile, idolized Ferdie while bullying her. When Belzer learned she possessed telekinesis, she used her powers to murder one of her tormentors. She would later use these powers to kill Ferdie and make it look like an accident. Belzer becomes a ventriloquist and serial killer, using a dummy named after her brother.

Belzer is one of six individuals who are kidnapped by a man identifying himself as "the Mockingbird" and sealed inside a shipping container underwater. After escaping, this group becomes known as the new Secret Six. Mockingbird is revealed to be the Riddler, who believes that one of the six stole a priceless diamond from him, but he does not know who. The thief is revealed to be Ferdie, whose persona is so separate from Belzer's that she did not even realize that her doll was the thief. In the final issue of Secret Six, Belzer betrays the team and abandons Ferdie when he insists that they remain loyal to the group. Belzer is incarcerated in Arkham Asylum, where she begins using a sock puppet.

== Powers and abilities ==
The first Ventriloquist (Arnold Wesker) has no superhuman powers, but possesses some basic hand-to-hand combat skills. He is a skilled ventriloquist and his Scarface persona is a skilled criminal strategist. Wesker usually carries a handgun of some kind, while Scarface carries a trademark Tommy gun. However, Wesker tends to show that he and Scarface hold two different personalities and he and Scarface can sometimes argue amongst each other, which tends to work as an advantage to Batman on several occasions.

The second Ventriloquist (Peyton Riley) is much more skilled in ventriloquism than her predecessor and is capable of pronouncing all speech patterns with more proficiency when in her Scarface persona. Unlike Wesker, Riley's personality does not contradict Scarface's and is much more willing to commit cruel acts, especially since she believes that she and the dummy are in a romantic relationship. Coming from an elite mob family, she is also a brilliant criminal mastermind.

== Other versions ==
- The Ventrilomaker, an amalgamation of the Ventriloquist and Toyman, appears in Superman/Batman.
- An alternate universe version of Arnold Wesker / Ventriloquist appears in Flashpoint.
- The Arnold Wesker incarnation of the Ventriloquist appears in Batman/Teenage Mutant Ninja Turtles #6.
- An alternate universe version of Arnold Wesker / Ventriloquist makes a minor appearance in The Batman Who Laughs #1 as one of several villains killed by the Joker.
- An alternate universe version of Arnold Wesker / Ventriloquist appears in Batman: White Knight #2. This version is African-American.

== In other media ==
=== Television ===
Ventriloquist and Scarface as depicted in The Batman episode "The Big Dummy".

- The Arnold Wesker incarnation of the Ventriloquist and Scarface appear in The Batman, both voiced by Dan Castellaneta. This version of Wesker is a ventriloquist who snapped after being booed off stage one night and turned to crime.
- An original incarnation of the Ventriloquist appears in Gotham, portrayed by real-life ventriloquist Andrew Sellon. This version is Arthur Penn, Oswald Cobblepot's accountant and an associate of Carmine Falcone. Penn works for Cobblepot until he is seemingly shot and killed by a street gang called the Street Demonz. In the episode "Nothing's Shocking", Penn wakes up in a morgue, treats his own injuries, and makes his way to an abandoned magic shop, where he finds an unsold ventriloquist dummy called Scarface. This triggers the creation of a split personality named after the dummy. Together, Penn and Scarface approach and threaten to kill Cobblepot so the latter can become Gotham's dominant mob boss. Cobblepot "kills" Scarface while his friend Edward Nygma kills Penn, arguing that he can no longer be trusted.
- The Arnold Wesker incarnation of the Ventriloquist and Scarface make cameo appearances in Titans, portrayed by an uncredited stunt double.

==== DC Animated Universe ====
The Ventriloquist and Scarface as they appear in Batman: The Animated Series.

The Arnold Wesker incarnation of the Ventriloquist and Scarface appear in media set in the DC Animated Universe (DCAU), both voiced by George Dzundza. The series' version of the former is a master ventriloquist who can pronounce every sound perfectly as Scarface, a decision series co-creator Bruce Timm fought for even though DC Comics wanted to maintain Scarface's speech impediment. Their henchmen, Rhino and Mugsy also appear throughout the franchise.

- The Ventriloquist and Scarface first appear in Batman: The Animated Series. In the DVD commentary for their introductory episode "Read My Lips", Timm stated that the Fox Kids censors allowed the recurring destruction of Scarface because he was not a "living" character, allowing the production staff to vent their darker impulses by doing so in increasingly gruesome ways.
- The Ventriloquist and Scarface appear in The New Batman Adventures episode "Double Talk". By this time, the former has reformed and been employed at Wayne Enterprises. However, Rhino and Mugsy attempt to force him into relapsing with help from a criminal with dwarfism posing as an independently-animated Scarface before Batman stops them.
- Alternate universe versions of the Ventriloquist and Scarface make a cameo appearance in the Justice League episode "A Better World" as one of several supervillains who were lobotomized by Superman of the Justice Lords to ensure peace. Notably, Scarface is the only one of the two to possess the scars left by the lobotomy process.

=== Film ===
- The Arnold Wesker incarnation of the Ventriloquist and Scarface make a cameo appearance in The Batman vs. Dracula.
- The Arnold Wesker incarnation of the Ventriloquist makes a cameo appearance in Scooby-Doo! & Batman: The Brave and the Bold.
- The DCAU incarnations of Arnold Wesker / Ventriloquist and Scarface make a cameo appearance in Space Jam: A New Legacy.
- The Arnold Wesker incarnation of the Ventriloquist and Scarface appears in Batman: Knightfall, voiced by Jeff Bennett.

=== Video games ===
- The Arnold Wesker incarnation of the Ventriloquist and Scarface appears in Batman: Gotham City Racer.
- The Arnold Wesker incarnation of the Ventriloquist and Scarface appear as a boss in Batman: Dark Tomorrow, both voiced by Michael Goz. This version is a crime boss and rival of Black Mask.
- The Arnold Wesker incarnation of the Ventriloquist and Scarface make minor appearances in the Batman: Arkham series.
  - Scarface makes non-speaking cameo appearances in Batman: Arkham Asylum, Batman: Arkham City, and Batman: Arkham Knight.
  - Wesker appears in Batman: Arkham Shadow, voiced by Dwight Schultz. This version takes on a handmade puppet named Woody, who was created by Wesker's cellmate in Blackgate.
- The Arnold Wesker incarnation of the Ventriloquist appears as a character summon in Scribblenauts Unmasked: A DC Comics Adventure.
- The Arnold Wesker incarnation of the Ventriloquist and Socko appear in Batman: The Telltale Series, both voiced by Larry Brisbowitz.
- The Arnold Wesker incarnation of the Ventriloquist appears as an unlockable playable character in the Nintendo DS version of Lego Batman: The Videogame.
- The Arnold Wesker incarnation of the Ventriloquist appears as an unlockable playable character in Lego DC Super-Villains, voiced by Dave B. Mitchell.

=== Miscellaneous ===
- The Arnold Wesker incarnation of the Ventriloquist and Scarface make a minor appearance in Batman: Arkham Unhinged.
- The Arnold Wesker incarnation of the Ventriloquist and Socko appear in the Harley Quinn and The Joker: Sound Mind Spotify podcast, both voiced by Andre Royo.

== See also ==
- List of Batman family enemies
