= The Coming of Atlas =

2008 comic book story arc

- Incentive variant cover of Superman, vol. 1, #677 (August 2008), art by Renato Guedes; the first issue of the story.
- Publisher: DC Comics
- Publication date: August – November 2008
- Genre: Superhero
- Title(s): Superman #677–680
- Main character(s): Superman; Atlas

Creative team
- Writer: James Robinson
- Penciller: Renato Guedes
- Inker: José Wilson Magalhães
- Letterer: Rob Leigh
- Colorist: Hi-Fi Colour
- Editor(s): Matt Idelson; Tom Palmer Jr.
- Hardcover: ISBN 1-4012-2131-9

"The Coming of Atlas" is a comic book story arc, from DC Comics, by writer James Robinson and artists Renato Guedes and José Wilson Magalhães, featuring Superman. This is Robinson's first story arc on the Superman title, as an ongoing writer after Kurt Busiek's departure. This, as well as Geoff Johns's "Brainiac" arc on Action Comics, led to their planned narrative unification on Action Comics, Superman and Supergirl in "Superman: New Krypton".

== Publication history ==
The character of Atlas' first and only appearance prior to this story was in DC Comics 1st Issue Special #1 in 1975.

James Robinson was named as the new Superman writer in February 2008. In many of his interviews approaching the start of his run, he stated that he always wanted to work on Superman, and also with writer Geoff Johns, comparing the two of them to Hal Jordan and Oliver Queen. Regarding his plans for the direction of the comic, starting with "Atlas", he was wary to share much, stating, "Geoff has a lot of ideas and I'm very much allowing him to run the show." He asserted, though, that by the end of it, every reader would care about every major character in the Superman universe. Because he had worked on "Batman: Face the Face", he was asked if his and Johns' work on the two Superman books would be the same. He was quick to reply that it would not be, but that it would be "better than that."

Robinson believes he has a connection to Superman, as he was "...a working-class British guy who came to America and America has given me everything", similar to the immigrant story that Superman's creation was based upon. But in regard to the choice of having Atlas as the villain for his opening arc, it was due to his love for "all things Jack Kirby".

His other main reason for doing the comic was Superman's rogues gallery, as he felt that:

"He has guys that can beat him punch for punch; fist for fist, Doomsday is obviously the prime example. But they all lack any sense of humanity. Atlas is going to have humanity. The way I like to look at him is like in the Marvel Universe, Namor is a hero but he really skates the fine line between being a hero and a villain, but he stays on the side of the hero. Atlas skates that line between being a hero and a villain but he ultimately always falls on the villain side".

He continued to say that Atlas will become a major player in the Superman mythos moving forward and there will be some real twists to the character.

== Plot summary ==
Superman, Krypto, and Hal Jordan play fetch in space. When Superman reflects happily on his life, wife, and dog, Jordan wonders if this point of view is what makes Clark the Greatest Man in the Universe. In Metropolis, the Science Police are fighting a giant monster. Their leader Dubarry is unsure if he can lead the team and hates feeling like Superman's janitor. The monster is killed by what appears to be Superman. But when he catches the falling Daily Planet globe, it is revealed to be Atlas, who then takes on and defeats the Science Police. Atlas yells for Superman, who comes straight from space telling him, "You did not have to yell".

Lois Lane and Jimmy Olsen run to the scene as Superman and Atlas exchange blows. During a break, a second wave of science police are defeated. In the past, Atlas had similar a fight with soldiers in front of his friend and father figure Chagra, but he was sucked into a portal, from which he watched as thousands of years passed. He awakes in a dark room, finding himself held in the air and restrained by a massive machine in front of an Army General. After a time, Atlas and the General come to an agreement that Atlas will fight Superman and the General will "observe". Atlas believes the General will go after him after he has killed Superman, but the General just wishes him luck. It is then revealed that Chagra was picked by Atlas to find a way for him to stop carrying the crystal, the source of his power. Chagra, with the aid of witches, used this to unstick Atlas in time, not wanting to kill his old friend even though he had become corrupted by power. Atlas and Superman begin to fight again.

Superman is getting more tired and beaten up as the fight continues. Lois remembers a conversation with Clark that morning when he said he wanted to spend his life with her and the intimate embrace they shared afterward. Lois admits Clark is her world and worries for his life. Lana Lang tries to send help as Lexcorp's C.E.O. but is fired as all Lexcorp employees are contractually forbidden to help Superman in any way. Supergirl comes to help Superman and a man on a roof communicates with someone who refers to the figure as Colonel. A satellite with the words "Hotel 7734" written on it fires a beam of energy that weakens Supergirl. Atlas believes her to be an Amazon and proclaims "easy to fight easy to.." but Superman sends him flying and tells Supergirl to fly away to find out what going on and avenge him if he falls. Atlas returns commenting that it was a pity that Supergirl fled. Atlas stomps on Superman and then defeats Steel and Bibbo Bibbowski, asking if anyone else would fight him. Krypto then appears, stating in broken English: "This One hurt Man. Krypto loves Man, Krypto hurt this One".

Krypto is fighting Atlas and unlike Superman has no problem injuring Atlas. The figure on the roof calls down another strike on Krypto, who is not affected. He is attacked repeatedly by the satellite in different settings called rooms, but is unaffected. The figure on the roof is revealed to be floating. Atlas is having trouble with Krypto and asks what kind of magic is the dog. Superman stands at this and rushes to find Zatanna who is in the city for a show but instead finds Zachary Zatara, the new permanent resident of Metropolis. Zatara is now not yet as good with magic as his cousin and can only affect living things for a short period of time. Superman can get a boost but for only less than a minute from the moment the fight begins. Atlas almost kills Krypto but then Superman appears and rams Atlas underground, Superman then re-emerges from the crater victorious. Superman tells them to applaud Krypto his dog and the dog of Metropolis as well. Krypto is applauded as his master pets him and proclaims his happiness.

=== Uniting the Super-titles ===
In the months before Johns started his Brainiac arc, and Robinson took over writing duties on Superman, both Johns and Robinson had made clear their plans for the Superman-related titles following those arcs for the rest of 2008 onto the end of 2010. Their plan is to link the three Super-books (Action Comics, Superman, and Supergirl), allowing them to cross over more fluidly on a regular basis, allowing the narratives to be tied together similar, to a bi-weekly series.

According to Johns, the plan is to make readers want to get the Super-titles because they would feel that "you HAVE to read, that you WANT to read". Robinson also added that even though neither he nor Johns would be writing Supergirl, they still made it clear that they were still the advisers to the book's next ongoing writer, Sterling Gates.

The link on all three titles began in the Superman: New Krypton story arc.

== Collected editions ==
The story arc was collected into a single volume:

- The Coming of Atlas (128 pages, hardcover, April 2009, 1401221319)
