= KGBeast =

DC Comics character

- Anatoli Knyazev as KGBeast in his debut on Batman #417 (March 1988), art by the character's co-creator Jim Aparo

Publication information
- Publisher: DC Comics
- First appearance: Batman #417 (March 1988)
- Created by: Jim Starlin (writer); Jim Aparo (artist)

In-story information
- Alter ego: Anatoli Knyazev
- Species: Human Cyborg
- Team affiliations: KGB; Black Lantern Corps; Suicide Squad; USSR
- Notable aliases: The Beast, Commander Star
- Abilities: Cybernetic augmentations grant: Enhanced strength, speed, stamina, agility, and durability; Enhanced senses; Expert martial artist and hand-to-hand combatant; Weapon proficiency; Explosives expert; Prosthetic gun in place of left hand; Highly skilled spy; Proficient tactician and strategist

KGBeast (Anatoli Knyazev) is a supervillain appearing in American comic books published by DC Comics. Created by Jim Starlin and Jim Aparo, the character first appeared as an adversary of Batman.

KGBeast has appeared in numerous series and films. Anatoli Knyazev appeared in his first live adaptation as a recurring cast member on The CW Arrowverse television series Arrow played by David Nykl, and also appeared as a secondary antagonist in the DC Extended Universe film Batman v Superman: Dawn of Justice played by Callan Mulvey.

== Publication history ==
KGBeast first appeared in Batman #417 (March 1988) and was created by Jim Starlin and Jim Aparo.

== Fictional character biography ==
=== Backstory ===
Anatoli Knyazev (Russian: Анато́лий Кня́зев, Anatoliy Knyazev), code-named "The Beast", and known to the CIA as the "KGBeast" is trained as an assassin by "The Hammer", a top secret cell of the KGB. In addition to being the master of several martial arts, his strength is cybernetically enhanced, and he also masters the use of every known deadly weapon. At the time of his first appearance, he is rumored to have killed at least 200 people.

=== First appearance ===
The Beast made his first appearance in the storyline, "Ten Nights of The Beast" Batman #417 (March 1988), which was later reprinted as a trade paperback of the same name. It was written by Jim Starlin and drawn by Jim Aparo and Mike DeCarlo.

The Hammer's general, angry that the Soviet government is working to better relations with the United States, sends Knyazev on a mission to kill 10 high-ranking U.S. officials in an attempt to cripple the Strategic Defense Initiative program. These include scientists, civilian administrators, military figures, and politicians, the last of whom being then-U.S. President Ronald Reagan, scheduled to visit Gotham City.

Despite Batman's best efforts, the Beast eliminates nearly all of his targets. In particular, he showcases his ruthlessness by poisoning an entire banquet, killing over 100 people, just to ensure that his target dies.

When Batman finally faces the Beast in hand-to-hand combat, the Beast quickly gains the upper hand, at the time, proves himself better than Batman in both tactical planning and engagement. However, failing to realize that he had advantages over Batman in abilities, the Beast flees and loses his opportunity to kill Batman, as he had improved his skills since then.

During the rematch between the two, Batman snares the Beast's left wrist with the Batrope. Rather than be captured, the Beast grabs a nearby axe and chops off the restrained hand. The Beast quickly has the limb replaced with a cybernetic gun, made by one of Gotham's top weapons dealers.

Before the final confrontation between Batman and the Beast, CIA agent Ralph Bundy reminds Batman that, if the Beast is captured alive, he will have to be handed over to the Soviets, and likely escape justice. Knowing this, Batman, after thwarting the Beast's assassination attempt on Reagan, destroys the Beast's gun-arm, lures him into the sewers, and then corners him in an underground room. The Beast invites Batman to fight him to the death, but instead Batman locks the room, effectively burying the assassin alive.

In the later story Batman: Year Three, Batman notes that he contacted the police to pick up the subdued villain.

=== Later appearances ===
The Beast escapes and goes into hiding, from where he sees the Soviet Union dissolve. His protégé NKVDemon surfaces in Russia, but is killed by Batman's ally, Soviet police detective Nikita Krakov. The Beast becomes a traditional supervillain, engaging in a counterfeiting scheme and having additional cybernetic implants inserted into his body. He fights Robin and the Huntress, but is ultimately defeated by King Snake. He later acquires a small nuclear bomb that he uses to threaten Gotham City. He is defeated by Robin and imprisoned in Blackgate Penitentiary.

In No Man's Land, the Beast appears as a henchman of Lock-Up during the latter's tenure as the unofficial warden of Blackgate.

==== One Year Later ====
One year after the events of Infinite Crisis, KGBeast is thrown from a roof by a man thought to be Two-Face. He is later found dead by police, having been shot in the head. Two-Face appears to be innocent of the murder; the killer is revealed to be Tally Man, who had been hired by Great White Shark. KGBBeast's body is later stolen by a mysterious group, who intend to resurrect him.

==== Blackest Night ====
During the Blackest Night storyline, KGBeast's corpse is reanimated by a black power ring and recruited to the Black Lantern Corps. He uses his ring to form a black energy construct of his gun arm.

==== Post-Flashpoint ====
As part of the New 52, the character gets a new backstory on the New Suicide Squad #2 (October 2014). KGBeast/Commander Anatoli Knyazev was a citizen of the USSR until it dissolved. He is trained by Boris Ulyanov/Hammer, as well as others like Kanto, and masters several forms of martial arts. In addition, he gains cybernetic abilities which increase his strength. He fights against the Suicide Squad as a Russian military soldier. After losing many times, he becomes a member of Suicide Squad.

=== DC Rebirth ===
In DC Rebirth, KGBeast is now simply The Beast. He is described as one of the world's best contract killers, who formerly worked for the U.S. government and typically is exclusive to Washington D.C. His logo is a 666 symbol. He has his own private island constructed to take his captured enemies there and hunt them to the death, free from national jurisdiction. He is hired by the Penguin, Black Mask, and Great White Shark to kill Batman and Two-Face after the latter threatens to release his collection of blackmail data to the world. Anatoli is last seen when, to stop him killing a group of rioting civilians, Batman lunges into him and over a cliff. Batman is saved by Duke Thomas, leaving Beast's fate uncertain.

Bane later hires KGBeast to break Batman by assassinating his protege Nightwing. Nightwing survives, but the head trauma combined with manipulation from the Court of Owls causes him to become amnesiac and take on the identity of Ric Grayson. KGBeast is tracked by Batman for one last encounter that leaves KGBeast with a broken neck. It is later revealed that he was saved from death by other agents.

== Other versions ==
An alternate universe version of KGBeast appears in Flashpoint as an inmate of the military Doom prison.

== In other media ==
=== Television ===
- KGBeast makes minor non-speaking appearances in Justice League Unlimited as a member of Gorilla Grodd's Secret Society before being killed by Darkseid.
- Anatoly Knyazev appears in Arrow, portrayed by David Nykl. This version is an ally of Oliver Queen who met him on the island of Lian Yu years prior, an informant for A.R.G.U.S., and a temporary member of Cayden James's cabal.
- KGBeast appears in Harley Quinn, voiced by Matt Oberg. This version is a member of the Legion of Doom.

=== Film ===
- KGBeast appears in Batman: Assault on Arkham, voiced by Nolan North. This version is a member of the Suicide Squad before being killed by Amanda Waller.
- Anatoly Knyazev appears in Batman v Superman: Dawn of Justice, portrayed by Callan Mulvey. This version is a mercenary, terrorist, and weapons trafficker who works for Lex Luthor.

=== Video games ===
- KGBeast appears as an NPC in the NES version of Batman: The Video Game. This version is a ninja who wields a sword and shuriken.
- KGBeast appears as a character summon in Scribblenauts Unmasked: A DC Comics Adventure.

== See also ==
- List of Batman family enemies
