= Witchcraft (comics) =

Witchcraft is a 1994 comic book series written by James Robinson and published by DC Comics.

== Plot summary ==
Witchcraft is a series in which the story is set against a romantically eerie backdrop of surviving paganism and karmic revenge, and blends historical and mystical elements through shifting scenes and moods. Its setting spans Medieval and Victorian England, presenting magic as a disguised persistence of older faiths. It positions the Law of Karma as central. The story features the inclusion of anachronisms like steel blades in 1342.

== Reception ==
Jonathan Palmer reviewed the Witchcraft graphic novel for Arcane magazine, rating it a 5 out of 10 overall, and stated that "Sociologists talk of the 'secularisation' of modern society - Christianity, or whatever, yielding to science. Yet we hear little of the re-emergence of religions and beliefs that predate Christianity's predominance in this country, except in graphic novels. You may feel you need resources like these for your games, but there are better examples than Witchcraft."
