= Who Is Wonder Woman? =

Comic book arc

- Cover of Wonder Woman: Who Is Wonder Woman? (2008), hardcover collected edition. Art by Terry Dodson and Rachel Dodson.
- Publisher: DC Comics
- Publication date: June 2006 – September 2007
- Genre: Superhero; Mythology
Title(s)
Wonder Woman vol. 3, #1–4
Wonder Woman Annual #1
- Main character(s): Wonder Woman, Nemesis, Wonder Man, Donna Troy, Cassie Sandsmark, Cheetah, Giganta, Circe

Creative team
- Writer: Alan Heinberg
- Penciller: Terry Dodson
- Inker: Rachel Dodson

"Who is Wonder Woman?" is a five-issue comic book story arc written by Allan Heinberg with art by Terry Dodson and Rachel Dodson.

It was originally published in the then-new third volume of the Wonder Woman title #1–4, and after much delay, was resolicited and finished in Annual #1. This was the "One Year Later" Wonder Woman story. The hardcover collection of the issues of this arc was released on March 5, 2008.

== Development ==
According to Allan Heinberg, the main influence for Who is Wonder Woman? was the Green Lantern: Rebirth mini-series. In fact, he saw his arc like it was a five issue mini-series similar to Green Lantern: Rebirth. There was an idea from Heinberg that he proposed to DC in actually making his, Jodi Picoult, and Gail Simone's arcs each into a mini-series. DC rejected his idea in favor of keeping Wonder Woman as a monthly book.

The story arc was delayed countless times between each issue. The reasons for the delay were Heinberg's writing duties on the TV series Grey's Anatomy colliding with his duties on the book. He did manage to give Terry Dodson only seven pages at least to keep him on the book for the art. DC was willing to wait for Heinberg, but in early 2007, had to move the book forward because of Amazons Attack!.

== Synopsis ==
The Amazon warrior Diana has gone missing, leaving Donna Troy to take up the mantle of Wonder Woman. When Diana returns, she goes under her former alias Diana Prince, acting as a secret agent and member of the Department of Metahuman Affairs and her first assignment is to save Donna Troy.

== Plot ==
One year after the events of Infinite Crisis, Princess Diana of Themyscira had dropped out of sight. Since then, the mantle of Wonder Woman had been passed to Donna Troy. Three villains, Giganta, Doctor Psycho, and Cheetah hold one of Diana's friends hostage at a museum on Themysciran history: Steve Trevor. The villains demand for the real Wonder Woman to release their comrade named TNT, but Donna goes in and frees Steve, which leads to a fight between her, Giganta and Cheetah in their new forms which leads outside. With the help of Dr. Psycho, Donna is kidnapped. Sarge Steel, head of the Department of Metahuman Affairs, talks to Steve Trevor, who is revealed to be agent Nemesis. There, he meets his new partner: agent Diana Prince (Diana in her new secret identity).

The next morning, Diana Prince goes to the museum for any clues. There, she meets Robin (Tim Drake) and her protégé Cassie Sandsmark of the Teen Titans. Cassie is angry at Diana for leaving her, even after she was in depression after Conner Kent's death. Having no answer as to why she had left her, Cassie takes off to fight the villains who have appeared again. With her friends and the Department in need of help, Diana goes into an alley and decides to become Wonder Woman for the first time in a year, but she is stopped by Hercules.

Hercules takes care of the villains and questions Diana on her new Diana Prince identity. He points out that she stands for truth, yet she had decided to live in a lie, and she further questions her mission for peace on Man's World. He departs, leaving Diana more confused on what she is doing. Nemesis questions Hercules' sudden appearance and goes with Diana Prince to sneak around his location. They are attacked by him, to which it's revealed that he is under the control of Circe. Commenting on Diana's decision on pretending to be human, she casts a spell on her, removing her powers so that she is human and Circe is now Wonder Woman.

News breaks out on the new Circe/Wonder Woman committing her own brand of justice by freeing women from forced labor and killing the men who has forced them. Hercules, sadden by the fact that he had attacked Diana despite it not being by his own actions, goes with her to Circe's island, Aeaea. Once they land, Circe attacks them. Subduing her, and grabbing her lasso of truth, she and Hercules go to her castle. Once there, Circe attacks again and Hercules stops her, but then he attacks Diana. It is revealed that Hercules and Circe were plotting against Diana and planning on ruling the world as their ultimate gods, but Circe double crossed him. Stopping him from killing Circe, Diana uses the lasso to force Circe to reverse the spell she had cast on her. She does, and Diana is now Wonder Woman once again, but then, her entire rogues gallery appears.

Attacked by all of her rogues, Diana manages to fight back until she is almost finished when Donna (in her old Wonder Girl outfit), Cassie, Nemesis, and members from the Teen Titans, the Justice Society, and the Justice League appear to help her. As they fight her rogues, Diana leaves to confront Hercules and Circe, who are fighting each other. Diana fights with Hercules, and since he is an evil god, she is prepared to kill him, but is stopped by Circe, who subdues and binds Hercules in chains. Circe is living her punishment, as she lives forever and has lost what made her want to stay alive. Diana had accepted that she can't be human, and feels alone because she doesn't quite belong anywhere as she mentions she was made from clay. Circe tells her that she is never alone, and secretly casts a spell on her as she leaves.

Diana Prince reports to Sarge and Nemesis on what happened to both Circe and Hercules, even though Nemesis mentions that he didn't see her when he arrived. Nemesis then shows her the things collected from Aeaea and she accidentally slits her hand on a sword and bleeds, which makes Diana confused. When meeting with Donna, she reveals that Circe made sure that she is human as Diana Prince and immortal as Wonder Woman, and thinks of it as some sort of gift. Now that she can be with humans instead of standing outside of them, Cassie and Donna go with her to the press conference to announce her return, with the rest of the superhero community with her and happy to have her back. Diana is happy, as she now knows "who is Wonder Woman".
