= Freshmen (comics) =

Top Cow comic book series

- Issue #1

Publication information
- Publisher: Top Cow Productions
- Schedule: Monthly
- Format: Limited series
- Publication date: (Vol. 1); June 8, 2005–February 22, 2006 (Vol. 2); November 2006 - July 2007
- No. of issues: 7
- Main character(s): Kenneth "Norrin" Weismeyer; Annalee Rogers; Charles Levy; Liam Adams; Elwood Johns; Renee Bellochio; Brady Lee; Jacques Lalleaux; Paula Pophouse; The Beaver

Creative team
- Created by: Seth Green; Hugh Sterbakov
- Written by: Hugh Sterbakov
- Artist: Andrew Pepoy
- Penciller: Leonard Kirk
- Inker: Andrew Pepoy
- Colorist: Tyson Wengler

Freshmen is a comic book series published by Top Cow, co-created by Seth Green and Hugh Sterbakov. The publication is marketed as "The adventures of college freshmen with extraordinary powers." Issue #1 was dated June 8, 2005.

Freshmen II was released between November 2006 and July 2007.

== Characters ==
=== The Freshmen ===
Real Name	Superhero Name	Background
Kenneth "Norrin" Weismeyer	Wannabe; The Scarlet Knight	The would-be team leader and resident superhero geek, who went for pizza during the Ax-Cell-Erator malfunction and has no powers.
Annalee Rogers	The Puppeteer	A psychology major who can jump into people's minds and enter their memories or control their bodies.
Charles Levy	The Green Thumb	A mulatto Jew, closeted homosexual and dedicated vegetarian who can now communicate with plants, leaving him nothing to eat.
Liam Adams	Quaker	An Amish boy who can cause earthquakes by shuffling his belly.
Elwood Johns	The Intoxicator	A former math genius whose toxic drunken burps intoxicate anyone who smells them.
Renee Bellochio; Brady Lee	The Drama Twins (Puller and Pusher, respectively)	Bickering exes who have telekinesis when they touch. Renee pulls objects toward them, Brady pushes them away.
Jacques Lalleaux	The Squirrel	A French exchange student who has become squirrel-like and compulsively hoards nuts.
Paula Pophouse	The Seductress	A relationship-obsessed teen who can make anyone fall in love with her.
The Beaver	The School Mascot	Imbued with quantum-busting intelligence, but cannot concentrate on anything but building dams.
Ray McFarland	Long Dong	Has an indestructible fifteen-foot long penis.
Jimmy Culkin	Post-It	His entire body is incredibly sticky.

=== Others ===
Real Name	Superhero Name	Background
Lisa Rohr	Cacophony	Mimic any sound she hears
Dr. Theodore Tomlinson	Dr. Tomlinson	Created the Ax-Cell-Erator! Can give people super-powers.
Rob	Rob the frat guy	Super-powered "frat guy"

== Story ==
=== Freshmen: Introduction to Superpowers ===
Fourteen college freshmen are cast out of the main dormitory and forced to live in temporary housing in the Boughl Science Building where they are given superhuman powers by the "ax-cell-erator" after an explosion. Dr. Theodore Tomlinson asks for the help of the super-powered freshmen to repair the device. Kenneth "Norrin" Weismeyer (a.k.a. Wannabe) who is obsessed with comic book superheroes but who went for pizza at the time of the accident and has no superpowers talks the freshmen into becoming superheroes and fighting criminals. At first the Freshmen are mostly concerned with learning how to use their powers, but later some of the team begin wearing costumes. Although the team's first field assignment is successful their second field assignment is not and Seductress is critically injured by Rob the frat guy and his Hulking Frat Guys.

After the fallout of their first major battle with Rob the frat guy and the Hulking Frat Guys, the Freshmen deal with the loss of Seductress who is in a coma. The Intoxicator finds out that Dr. Theodore Tomlinson is giving Rob the frat guy and the Hulking Frat Guys their powers and The Puppeteer goes into Seductress's mind in hopes of waking her up, but finds dark memories in her. Wannabe is betraying the team to Dr. Tomlinson in hopes of getting his own superpowers. The final battle with Rob the frat guy and the Hulking Frat Guys is to stop them from spreading a disease to millions, and in the end Dr. Theodore Tomlinson, Rob the frat guy, and the Hulking Frat Guys are killed, Seductress wakes up and the team goes on Christmas break.

=== Norrin's Last Captain's Log ===
Norrin takes The Beaver home for Christmas break. After much soul searching and starting a working-out regime Norrin takes the new superhero name "The Scarlet Knight".

=== Freshmen II: Fundamentals of Fear ===
The Freshmen return after the Christmas break to the Boughl Science Building. Norrin Weismeyer meets Annalee Rogers's father and started to see a man who looks like Mr. Fiddlesticks, an old story book character of Norrin's childhood. Paula Pophouse has made a better recovery over the break. Annalee and Brady begin to have a romantic affair. Charles Levy is finding his power increasingly intolerable. Norrin begins dating a woman named Amy. A new superhero, Leonard Kirk, joins the Freshmen. After meeting Brady, Annalee is kidnapped by her father. The Freshmen rush to save her.

=== Freshmen: Summer Vacation Special ===
The Team comes together (minus Jacques Lalleaux) to fight Susie, Charles Levy's ficus who is now a 50 feet monster plant and is still in love with him.

== Trade paperbacks ==
=== Freshmen Vol.1: "Introduction to Superpowers" ===
- Reprints of all six issues of the limited series.
- Reprints of Freshmen Yearbook
- Cover gallery
- New introductions by creators Seth Green and Hugh Sterbakov
- Features bonus 10-page text story: "Norrin's Last Captain's Log" featuring Norrin and The Beaver's adventures during their Christmas break

=== Freshmen II: "Fundamentals of Fear" ===
- Reprints of all six issues of the limited series.
- Cover gallery
- Characters' diaries and notebooks of Paula Pophouse, Elwood Johns, The Beaver and Liam Adams
