= Tally Man =

The Tally Man is the name of two supervillains in the DC Universe.

== Fictional character biographies ==
=== Original Tally Man ===
Tally Man

Publication information
- Publisher: DC Comics
- First appearance: Batman: Shadow of the Bat #19 (October 1993)
- Created by: Alan Grant (writer); Vincent Giarrano (artist)

In-story information
- Species: Human
- Team affiliations: Secret Society of Super Villains
- Abilities: Skilled sharpshooter

The original Tally Man comes from a poor family who lived in fear of the criminals who they owed money to. After Tally Man's father died, the criminals began extorting his mother. One night, when the collector came, his mother could not afford to pay and the criminal beat her. Filled with rage, Tally Man killed the money collector with a fireplace poker. He was arrested for murder and abused by other prisoners while in prison. After being released from prison, he discovered that his sister had died of starvation and his mother had committed suicide during his internment.

Years later, a figure dressed in the strange dark robes of an old-fashioned tax collector emerges in Gotham City, calling himself the Tally Man. Hired by the underworld to "collect" on debts owed, his fee is not money, but human lives; he claims to have killed sixty-six people since his original victim. When Tally Man attempts to collect the "debt" owed by Batman, he battles Azrael, who is standing in for Batman. Azrael brutally beats and scars Tally Man.

In the Infinite Crisis storyline, Tally Man appears as a member of Alexander Luthor Jr.'s Secret Society of Super Villains.

=== Second Tally Man ===
Tally Man

Publication information
- Publisher: DC Comics
- First appearance: Detective Comics #817 (May 2006)
- Created by: James Robinson (writer); Leonard Kirk (artist)

In-story information
- Species: Human
- Abilities: Skilled sharpshooter

The second Tally Man is an African-American enforcer and hitman working for the Great White Shark. Tally Man shows up at the household of supervillain Orca and kills her husband, Terry Capshaw. Tally Man then shoots private investigator Jason Bard in the arm as he is reaching for his gun. Bard knocks Tally Man unconscious with a swift kick.

It is later revealed that Tally Man had been killing several other villains in revenge for a period of time in Arkham Asylum where Two-Face had promised to protect the Great White Shark from danger and did not actively move to do so.

== In other media ==
- An original character partially based on the second Tally Man named Mr. Blank appears in the Arrow episode "Home Invasion", portrayed by J. August Richards. This version is an assassin. He is hired by businessman Edward Rasmus to kill the Moore family before they can sue him for stealing their life savings. Though Blank kills most of the Moores, their son Taylor was placed in their attorney Laurel Lance's custody. Blank subsequently kills Rasmus before targeting her, only to be killed by the Hood.
- Tally Man appears as a character summon in Scribblenauts Unmasked: A DC Comics Adventure.
- The first Tally Man makes a minor appearance in the Batman: No Man's Land novelization, in which he is killed by Two-Face.

== See also ==
- List of Batman family enemies
