= Leonard Kirk =

Artist

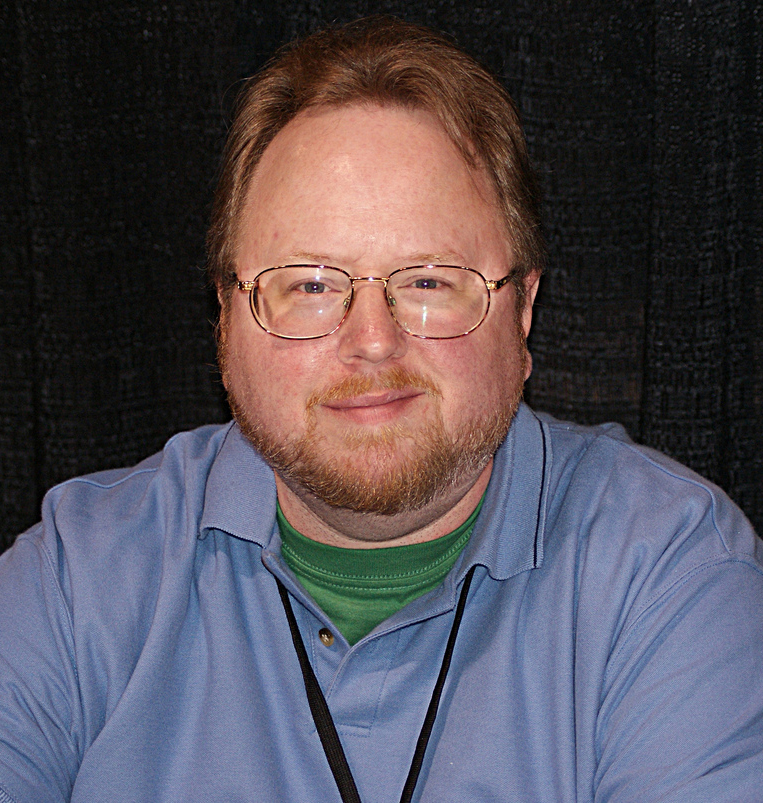
- Kirk in June 2011
- Born: United States
- Area: Artist
- Notable works: JSA, Agents of Atlas, Supergirl, X-Factor

Leonard Kirk is an American-born comic book artist living in Canada. He has worked on such properties as Supergirl, JSA, Star Trek, Batman, and Witchblade. Currently Kirk is exclusively signed for Marvel Comics.

== Career ==
Kirk first broke into the comics field pencilling issue #5 of the Malibu Comics title Dinosaurs for Hire and issue #1 of Captain Canuck vol.2. He then went on to pencil Star Trek: Deep Space Nine comics for Malibu.

In 1995, he began working with Marvel, penciling the Ultragirl miniseries.

In 1997, he began a long association with DC Comics, beginning with a nearly 60-issue run on the Peter David written Supergirl series. Following that, he penciled the Dan Jolley written Bloodhound, which was canceled within a year.

He penciled the Fred Van Lente written Scorpion story in the Marvel anthology title Amazing Fantasy. Following that, he illustrated the miniseries, Freshmen, written by Seth Green and Hugh Sterbakov, for Top Cow.

He returned for a year to work at DC, filling in on Aquaman and doing the layouts in Detective Comics' "One Year Later" storyline Face the Face that ran through both Batman and Detective Comics.

Later in 2006, Kirk signed an exclusive deal with Marvel Comics, his first project being a six issue Jeff Parker written Agents of Atlas miniseries, which included Wakandan-born S.H.I.E.L.D. agent, Derek Khanata from the Scorpion story he penciled in Amazing Fantasy. Marvel has proceeded to assign him to pencil Marvel Adventures: The Avengers (from issue #13 onwards), The Amazing Spider-Man Family, and a fill-in for the World War Hulk storyline in The Incredible Hulk #108.

In 2008 Kirk provided the art for Captain Britain and MI: 13, written by Paul Cornell, which began in May of that year.

In 2011 Kirk began a run on X-Factor, reuniting him with his Supergirl collaborator, Peter David, penciling issues 225 - 228. Kirk would return to that title with issue 233, and remained the regular penciller on it until it ended in mid-2013 with issue 256. David has named Kirk one of the three artists whose art has mostly closely matched the visuals he conceived when writing comic book scripts (the others being George Pérez and Dale Keown).

== Bibliography ==
=== DC Comics ===
- Aquaman #33-38 (2005-2006)
- Batman #651-654 (2006)
- Bloodhound #1-8, 10 (2004-2005)
- Deadman: Dead Again #1, 3, 5 (2001)
- Detective Comics #817-820 (2006)
- H.E.R.O. #12-14 (with writer Will Pfeifer, 2004)
- JSA #33-37, 40-45, 48-51, 74-75 (2002-2005)
- Legion of Super Heroes (vol. 4) #4
- Supergirl (vol. 3) #10, 13-31, 34-65, 68-70, 72-74 (1997-2002)

=== Marvel Comics ===
- Ultragirl #1-3
- Agents of Atlas #1-6 (2006)
- Amazing Fantasy #7-12 (2005)
- World War Hulk Aftersmash: Warbound #1-4 (2008)
- Captain Britain and MI: 13 #1-4, 6-15 (with Paul Cornell, May 2008-July 2009):
  - Secret Invasion (collects Captain Britain and MI: 13 #1-4, 104 pages, Panini Comics, January 2009, ISBN 1-84653-407-0, Marvel Comics, March 2009, ISBN 0-7851-3344-5)
  - Hell Comes To Birmingham (collects Captain Britain and MI: 13 #5-9, 120 pages, Panini Comics, June 2009, ISBN 1-84653-423-2, Marvel Comics, July 2009, ISBN 0-7851-3345-3)
  - Vampire State (collects Captain Britain and MI: 13 #10-15 + annual #1, 184 pages, Marvel Comics, October 2009, ISBN 0-7851-3952-4)
- All-New Savage She-Hulk #4 (2009)
- Dark X-Men: The Beginning #1-3 (with Paul Cornell, September–October 2009, hardcover, December 2009, ISBN 0-7851-4230-4)
- Dark X-Men (with Paul Cornell, #1-5 (limited series), January 2010-ongoing, premiere hardcover, June 2010, ISBN 0-7851-4526-5)
- Uncanny X-Men #527 (2010)
- Avengers vs. Atlas #3 (2010)
- New Mutants v3 #17-21 (2010-2011)
- Sigil #1-4 (2011)
- X-Factor v2 #225-228, 233-236, 241-245, 249-256 (2011-2013)
- Hunger #1-4 (2013)
- Fantastic Four v5 1-8, 11-14, 642-645 (2014-2015)
- Squadron Supreme v4 1-8, 10-14 (2016-2017)
- All-New Wolverine #19-25 (2017)
- Black Panther #166-172 (2017-2018)
- Marvel Zombies Resurrection #1-4 (limited series)
- Captain America v9 #25-30 (2021)
- Sabretooth #1-5 (2022)
- Sabretooth & The Exiles #1-5 (2022-2023)
- Avengers, Inc. #1-5 (2023)

=== Other publishers ===
- Dinosaurs for Hire #5-12 (Malibu Comics)
- Freshmen #1-6 (Image Comics)
- Star Trek: Deep Space Nine #9-25, 28, 31 (Malibu Comics)
- Switchblade (Silverline) #1-2
- Witchblade #71 (Image Comics)
