= Don Kramer =

American artist

- Born: August 6, 1969 (age 57); Seoul, South Korea
- Education: Illinois Wesleyan University
- Occupation: Comic book artist
- Notable work: JSA; Nightwing; Wonder Woman
- Website: donkramerart.com

Don Kramer is an American comics artist. He has worked for both Marvel and DC, as well as on independent projects. Titles at DC include a Doctor Fate miniseries with Chris Golden, JSA with Geoff Johns and a run on Detective Comics with Paul Dini. He was also the artist for Nightwing with Peter Tomasi, the JSA vs Kobra mini-series with Eric Trautmann and J. Michael Straczynski's run on Wonder Woman.

Kramer was born in Seoul, South Korea, raised in Chebanse, Illinois, and is a graduate of Illinois Wesleyan University in Bloomington, Illinois.
