= List of animated Batman films =

Batman is a superhero appearing in American comic books published by DC Comics. Outside of comics, the character's first appearance was in the 15-chapter theatrical serial Batman (1943), with Tim Burton's Batman (1989) marking his first big-budget film. Batman: Mask of the Phantasm (1993) mark the first animated film to star Batman; part of Batman: The Animated Series (1992–1995), Mask of the Phantasm was initially set for a direct-to-video release, before Warner Bros. gave it a theatrical release. Since then, Warner Bros. has released multiple films starring Batman direct-to-video, through digital storefronts and platforms, or on television.

The Lego Batman Movie (2017) is the only animated Batman film besides Mask of the Phantasm to receive a wide theatrical release. Other films like Batman: The Killing Joke (2016), Batman: Return of the Caped Crusaders (2016), Batman and Harley Quinn (2017), and Aztec Batman: Clash of Empires (2025) received a limited release in theaters.

== DC Animated Universe ==
Phase One films
Film	U.S. release date	Director(s)	Screenwriter(s)	Producer(s)
Batman: Mask of the Phantasm	December 25, 1993	Eric Radomski and Bruce Timm	Alan Burnett, Paul Dini, Martin Pasko, and Michael Reaves	Benjamin Melniker and Michael Uslan
Batman & Mr. Freeze: SubZero	March 17, 1998	Boyd Kirkland	Boyd Kirkland and Randy Rogel	Boyd Kirkland and Randy Rogel
Batman Beyond: Return of the Joker	December 12, 2000	Curt Geda	Paul Dini, Glen Murakami, and Bruce Timm	Alan Burnett, Paul Dini, Glen Murakami, and Bruce Timm
Batman: Mystery of the Batwoman	October 21, 2003	Curt Geda	Michael Reaves and Alan Burnett	Margaret M. Dean
Batman and Harley Quinn	July 21, 2017	Sam Liu	Bruce Timm and Jim Krieg	—N/a

- 1993: Batman: Mask of the Phantasm, with Kevin Conroy voicing Batman
- 1998: Batman & Mr. Freeze: SubZero, with Kevin Conroy voicing Batman
- 2000: Batman Beyond: Return of the Joker, with Will Friedle and Kevin Conroy voicing Batman
- 2003: Batman: Mystery of the Batwoman, with Kevin Conroy voicing Batman
- 2017: Batman and Harley Quinn, with Kevin Conroy voicing Batman
- 2019: Justice League vs. the Fatal Five, with Kevin Conroy voicing Batman

== Superman/Batman duology ==
Phase One films
Film	U.S. release date	Director(s)	Screenwriter(s)	Producer(s)
Superman/Batman: Public Enemies	September 29, 2009	Sam Liu	Stan Berkowitz	Bruce Timm, Alan Burnett, Michael Goguen, Bobbie Page, Sam Register, Benjamin Melniker, and Michael Uslan
Superman/Batman: Apocalypse	September 28, 2010	Lauren Montgomery	Tab Murphy	Bruce Timm, Alan Burnett, Bobbi Page, Lauren Montgomery, Sam Register, Benjamin Melniker, Michael Uslan

- 2009: Superman/Batman: Public Enemies, an adaptation of "Superman/Batman: Public Enemies" by Jeph Loeb and Ed McGuinness with Kevin Conroy voicing Batman
- 2010: Superman/Batman: Apocalypse, an adaptation of "Superman/Batman: The Supergirl from Krypton" by Jeph Loeb and Michael Turner with Kevin Conroy voicing Batman

== DC Animated Movie Universe ==
Phase One films
Film	U.S. release date	Director(s)	Screenwriter(s)	Producer(s)
Son of Batman	April 22, 2014	Ethan Spaulding	Joe R. Lansdale and James Robinson	James Tucker
Batman vs. Robin	April 4, 2015	Jay Oliva	J. M. DeMatteis	James Tucker
Batman: Bad Blood	January 20, 2016	Jay Oliva	J. M. DeMatteis	James Tucker
Batman: Hush	July 20, 2019	Justin Copeland	E. J. Altbacker	Amy McKenna

- 2013: Justice League: The Flashpoint Paradox, based on "Flashpoint" by Geoff Johns and Andy Kubert, with Kevin Conroy and Kevin McKidd voicing Batman
- 2014: Justice League: War, based on "Justice League: Origin" by Geoff Johns and Jim Lee, with Jason O'Mara voicing Batman
- 2014: Son of Batman, based on "Batman and Son" by Grant Morrison and Andy Kubert, with Jason O'Mara voicing Batman
- 2015: Justice League: Throne of Atlantis, based on "Throne of Atlantis" by Geoff Johns, with Jason O'Mara voicing Batman
- 2015: Batman vs. Robin, based on "Batman: Night of the Owls" by Scott Snyder and Greg Capullo, with Jason O'Mara voicing Batman
- 2016: Batman: Bad Blood with Jason O'Mara voicing Batman
- 2016: Justice League vs. Teen Titans with Jason O'Mara voicing Batman
- 2017: Justice League Dark, with Jason O'Mara voicing Batman
- 2018: The Death of Superman, based on "The Death of Superman", with Jason O'Mara voicing Batman
- 2019: Reign of the Supermen, based on "Reign of the Supermen", with Jason O'Mara voicing Batman
- 2019: Batman: Hush, based on "Batman: Hush" by Jeph Loeb and Jim Lee, with Jason O'Mara voicing Batman
- 2020: Justice League Dark: Apokolips War, with Jason O'Mara voicing Batman

== Batman Unlimited ==
Phase One films
Film	U.S. release date	Director(s)	Screenwriter(s)	Producer(s)
Batman Unlimited: Animal Instincts	May 12, 2015	Butch Lukic	Heath Corson	Butch Lukic
Batman Unlimited: Monster Mayhem	August 18, 2015	Butch Lukic	Heath Corson	Butch Lukic
Batman Unlimited: Mechs vs. Mutants	August 30, 2016	Curt Geda	Kevin Burke; Chris "Doc" Wyatt	Butch Lukic

- 2015: Batman Unlimited: Animal Instincts, an animated film with Roger Craig Smith voicing Batman
- 2015: Batman Unlimited: Monster Mayhem, an animated film with Roger Craig Smith voicing Batman
- 2016: Batman Unlimited: Mechs vs. Mutants, an animated film with Roger Craig Smith voicing Batman

== Holy Adam West Universe, Batman! ==
- 2016: Batman: Return of the Caped Crusaders, based on the Batman television series with Adam West voicing Batman
- 2017: Batman vs. Two-Face, based on the Batman television series with Adam West voicing Batman for final time before his death

== Ninjaverse ==
- 2018: Batman Ninja
- 2025: Batman Ninja vs. Yakuza League

== Tomorrowverse ==
- 2021: Batman: The Long Halloween Part 1 and Part 2, a two part animated film based on Batman: The Long Halloween by Jeph Loeb and Tim Sale, with Jensen Ackles voicing Batman.
- 2023: Legion of Super-Heroes with Jensen Ackles voicing Batman.
- 2023: Justice League: Warworld with Jensen Ackles voicing Batman.
- 2024: Justice League: Crisis on Infinite Earths, based on Crisis on Infinite Earths by Marv Wolfman and George Pérez, with Jensen Ackles voicing Batman. Addtionaly, Will Freddle and Kevin Conroy reprise their roles as the DCAU versions of Batman.

== Stand-alone films ==
- 2005: The Batman vs. Dracula, set in the continuity of The Batman with Rino Romano voicing Batman
- 2010: Under the Red Hood, an adaptation of "Batman: Under the Hood" by Judd Winick, with Bruce Greenwood voicing Batman
- 2011: Year One, an adaptation of "Batman: Year One" by Frank Miller and David Mazzucchelli, with Benjamin McKenzie voicing Batman
- 2012: The Dark Knight Returns – Part 1, an adaptation of the first half of The Dark Knight Returns by Frank Miller, with Peter Weller voicing Batman
- 2013: The Dark Knight Returns – Part 2, an adaptation of the second half of The Dark Knight Returns by Frank Miller, with Peter Weller voicing Batman
- 2013: DC Super Heroes Unite, an adaptation of Lego Batman 2: DC Super Heroes with Troy Baker voicing Batman
- 2014: Assault on Arkham, set in the continuity of Batman: Arkham with Kevin Conroy voicing Batman
- 2016: Batman: The Killing Joke, an adaptation of Batman: The Killing Joke by Alan Moore and Brian Bolland, with Kevin Conroy voicing Batman
- 2018: Scooby-Doo! & Batman: The Brave and the Bold, set in the continuity of Batman: The Brave and the Bold with Diedrich Bader voicing Batman
- 2018: Batman: Gotham by Gaslight, an animated film based on the one-shot graphic novel of the same name by Brian Augustyn and Mike Mignola, with Bruce Greenwood voicing Batman
- 2019: Batman vs. Teenage Mutant Ninja Turtles, with Troy Baker voicing Batman
- 2021: Batman: Soul of the Dragon, an animated film with David Giuntoli voicing Batman
- 2022: Batman and Superman: Battle of the Super Sons with Troy Baker voicing Batman
- 2023: Batman: The Doom That Came to Gotham, an adaptation of Batman: The Doom That Came to Gotham, with David Giuntoli voicing Batman
- 2023: Merry Little Batman with Luke Wilson voicing Batman
- 2025: Aztec Batman: Clash of Empires with Horacio García Rojas voicing Batman in Spain and Jay Hernandez in English
- 2026: Batman: Knightfall, an adaptation of "Batman: Knightfall", with Anson Mount voicing Batman

== Ensemble/cameo roles ==
=== Theatrical ===
- 2017: DC Super Heroes vs. Eagle Talon, with Takayuki Yamada voicing Batman
- 2018: Teen Titans Go! To the Movies with Jimmy Kimmel voicing Batman.
- 2022: DC League of Super-Pets, with Keanu Reeves voicing Batman.

==== Direct-to-video ====
- 2008: Justice League: The New Frontier, based on the comic of the same name by Darwyn Cooke, with Jeremy Sisto voicing Batman
- 2010: Justice League: Crisis on Two Earths, a loose adaptation of JLA: Earth 2 by Grant Morrison and Frank Quitely, with William Baldwin voicing Batman
- 2010: DC Super Friends: The Joker's Playhouse, based on the Fisher-Price toyline with Daran Norris voicing Batman
- 2012: Justice League: Doom, based on "JLA: Tower of Babel" by Mark Waid, with Kevin Conroy voicing Batman
- 2014: JLA Adventures: Trapped in Time, with Diedrich Bader voicing Batman
- 2014: Lego DC Comics Super Heroes: Batman Be-Leaguered animated television special, with Troy Baker reprising his role as Batman from the Lego video games.
- 2015: Justice League: Gods and Monsters with Michael C. Hall voicing a Kirk Langstrom version of Batman
- 2015: Lego DC Comics Super Heroes: Justice League vs. Bizarro League, with Troy Baker voicing Batman
- 2016: Lego DC Comics Super Heroes: Justice League – Cosmic Clash, with Troy Baker voicing Batman
- 2018: Lego DC Comics Super Heroes: The Flash, with Troy Baker voicing Batman
- 2018: Lego DC Comics Super Heroes: Aquaman – Rage of Atlantis, with Troy Baker voicing Batman
- 2020: Lego DC: Shazam!: Magic and Monsters, with Troy Baker voicing Batman
- 2020: Superman: Red Son, based on Superman: Red Son by Mark Millar, with Roger Craig Smith voicing Batman.
- 2021: Injustice, an animated film based on the 2013 video game Injustice: Gods Among Us, featuring a parallel universe in the DC Multiverse, with Anson Mount voicing Batman.

== The Lego Movie series ==
- 2014: A Lego-themed version of Batman appears in The Lego Movie, voiced by Will Arnett.
- 2017: The character receives his own spin-off film, The Lego Batman Movie, voiced again by Arnett. This film takes place in a universe where all of the previous live-action films, as well as some animated series, the preceding film, and the 1966 TV series (which the film mocks in multiple instances) have somehow happened. Despite this, the film works as an origin story for both Robin and Batgirl, and is established in Lego Dimensions to be set in the Lego DC universe, distinct from The Lego Movie universe.
- 2019: Arnett reprised his role as Lego Batman in The Lego Movie 2: The Second Part.

== Anthology and short films ==
- 2008: Batman: Gotham Knight, a collection of original shorts with Kevin Conroy voicing Batman
- 2020: Batman: Death in the Family, an interactive short film based on the story arc from the comics that allows the viewer to choose different outcomes of the story; featuring Bruce Greenwood voicing Batman
