= Robin in other media =

Superhero Robin in non-comicbook media

Adaptations of Robin in other media
- Original source: Comics published by DC Comics
- First appearance: Detective Comics #38 (April 1940)

Films and television
- Film(s): List: Batman (1943); Batman and Robin (1949); Batman (1966); Batman Forever (1995); Batman & Robin (1997); Batman & Mr. Freeze: SubZero (1998); Justice League: The New Frontier (2008); Batman: Under the Red Hood (2010); Batman: The Dark Knight Returns (2012); Son of Batman (2014); Batman vs. Robin (2015); Batman: Bad Blood (2016); Justice League vs. Teen Titans (2016); Batman: Return of the Caped Crusaders (2016); The Lego Batman Movie (2017); Teen Titans: The Judas Contract (2017); Batman vs. Two-Face (2017); Batman Ninja (2018); Teen Titans Go! To the Movies (2018)
- Television show(s): List: Batman (1966-1968); The Batman/Superman Hour (1968); The New Adventures of Batman (1977); Batman: The Animated Series (1992–1998); Superman: The Animated Series (1996–2000); Teen Titans (2003–2006); The Batman (2004–2008); Batman: The Brave and the Bold (2008–2011); Young Justice (2010–2022); Teen Titans Go! (2013–)

Audio presentations
- Radio show(s): The Adventures of Superman (1945)

In addition to DC Comics books, the superhero Robin also appears in other media, such as films, television and radio. Dick Grayson, Jason Todd, Tim Drake, Stephanie Brown, and Damian Wayne are examples of the characters who use the name Robin.

While typically portrayed in media associated with Batman, the character has also appeared in several projects that depict him as the leader of the Teen Titans.

== Television ==
=== Live-action ===
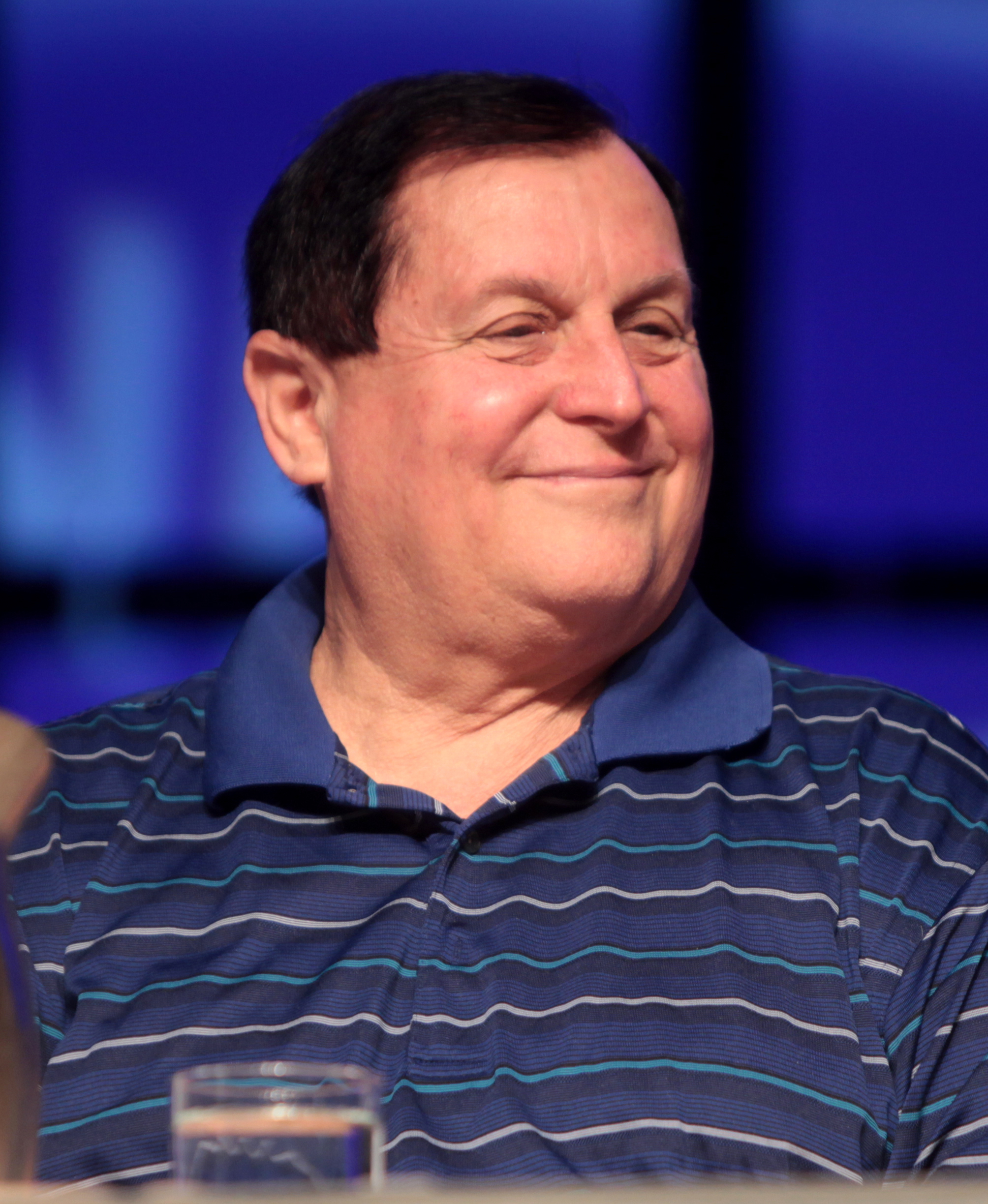
Burt Ward played Robin in the 1966–1968 Batman TV series as well as a 1966 film of the same name

- The Dick Grayson incarnation of Robin appears in Batman (1966), portrayed by Burt Ward. Ward reprised the role in Legends of the Superheroes and the Arrowverse crossover "Crisis on Infinite Earths".
- The Dick Grayson, Jason Todd, and Tim Drake incarnations of Robin appear in Titans, respectively portrayed by Brenton Thwaites, Curran Walters, and Jay Lycurgo. Additionally, Carrie Kelley, Stephanie Brown, and Duke Thomas make uncredited cameo appearances in the episode "Barbara Gordon".
- The Carrie Kelley incarnation of Robin appears in Gotham Knights, portrayed by Navia Robinson.

=== Animation ===
Robin in Teen Titans Go!

- The Dick Grayson incarnation of Robin appears in The Adventures of Batman, voiced by Casey Kasem.
- The Dick Grayson incarnation of Robin appears in The New Scooby-Doo Movies, voiced again by Casey Kasem.
- The Dick Grayson incarnation of Robin appears in the Super Friends franchise, voiced by Casey Kasem and Burt Ward.
- The Dick Grayson and Tim Drake incarnations of Robin appear in series set in the DC Animated Universe (DCAU). Dick is voiced by Loren Lester as an adult and Joey Simmrin as a child, while Tim is voiced by Mathew Valencia in The New Batman Adventures, Eli Marienthal and Shane Sweet in Static Shock, and Dean Stockwell in Batman Beyond: Return of the Joker.
- The Dick Grayson incarnation of Robin appears in Teen Titans, voiced by Scott Menville. A future version of him who became Nightwing appears in the episode "How Long Is Forever?".
- The Dick Grayson incarnation of Robin appears in The Batman, voiced by Eve Sabara. (Note: Originally credited as Evan Sabara; Eve came out as a trans woman in 2020.) A future version of him who became Nightwing appears in the episode "Artifacts", voiced by Jerry O'Connell.
- Robbie, a robin character inspired by Robin, appears in Krypto the Superdog, voiced by David Paul Grove.
- The Dick Grayson and Damian Wayne incarnations of Robin appear in Batman: The Brave and the Bold. Damian is voiced by Patrick Cavanaugh, while Dick is voiced by Crawford Wilson as an adult and Jeremy Shada as a child.
- The Dick Grayson, Jason Todd, Tim Drake, Stephanie Brown, and Damian Wayne incarnations of Robin appear in Young Justice, respectively voiced by Jesse McCartney, Josh Keaton, Cameron Bowen, and Mae Whitman.
- The Teen Titans incarnation of Dick Grayson / Robin appears in the New Teen Titans shorts, voiced again by Scott Menville.
- The Dick Grayson incarnation of Robin appears in DC Super Friends (2015), voiced by Johnny Yong Bosch.
- The Damian Wayne incarnation of Robin appears in DC Super Hero Girls (2015), voiced by Grey DeLisle.
- The Dick Grayson incarnation of Robin appears in Teen Titans Go!, voiced again by Scott Menville. Additionally, the Teen Titans original series incarnation of the character appears in the episode "The Academy" via archival footage.
- The Dick Grayson incarnation of Robin appears in DC Super Hero Girls (2019), voiced by Keith Ferguson.
- The Damian Wayne incarnation of Robin appears in Harley Quinn, voiced by Jacob Tremblay. Dick Grayson as Nightwing is introduced in the third season, and is voiced by Harvey Guillén. Harley accidentally kills Nightwing while sleepwalking, however he was resurrected by Talia al Ghul and is ordered to kill her and Ivy under the mantle of Red X.
- The Duke Thomas incarnation of Robin appears in Batwheels, voiced by AJ Hudson. Dick Grayson as Nightwing appears in the second season, voiced by Zachary Gordon.
- A young Dick Grayson, Jason Todd, Carrie Kelley, and Stephanie Brown appear in the Batman: Caped Crusader episode "Nocturne", respectively voiced by Carter Rockwood, Henry Witcher, Juliet Donenfeld, and Amari McCoy. These versions are orphans under Leslie Thompkins' care.

== Film ==
Chris O'Donnell as both Dick Grayson and Robin in 1995's Batman Forever.

=== Live-action ===
- The Dick Grayson incarnation of Robin appears in Batman (1943), portrayed by Douglas Croft.
- The Dick Grayson incarnation of Robin appears in Batman and Robin (1949), portrayed by Johnny Duncan.
- The Dick Grayson incarnation of Robin appears in early scripts for Batman (1989), but is absent from the final film. Michael J. Fox, Eddie Murphy, and Marlon Wayans were considered for the role. In 2021, DC released a comic continuation entitled Batman '89, which includes an original incarnation of Robin named Drake Winston.
- Dick Grayson appears in Batman Forever and Batman & Robin, portrayed by Chris O'Donnell. A spin-off starring Robin was planned, but scrapped after the failure of Batman & Robin.
- Robin John Blake appears in The Dark Knight Rises, portrayed by Joseph Gordon-Levitt.
- Dick Grayson is alluded to in the DC Extended Universe films Batman v Superman: Dawn of Justice and Suicide Squad. The '60s incarnation of Robin with Burt Ward's likeness makes a brief cameo appearance in The Flash.
- The Damian Wayne incarnation of Robin will appear in the DC Universe film The Brave and the Bold.

=== Animation ===
- The Dick Grayson incarnation of Robin appears in Justice League: The New Frontier, voiced by Shane Haboucha.
- The Dick Grayson and Jason Todd incarnations of Robin appear in Batman: Under the Red Hood. Dick is voiced by Neil Patrick Harris, while Jason is voiced by Jensen Ackles as an adult and Vincent Martella and Alexander Martella as a child.
- The Carrie Kelley incarnation of Robin appears in Batman: The Dark Knight Returns, voiced by Ariel Winter.
- An unidentified incarnation of Robin appears in JLA Adventures: Trapped in Time, voiced by Jack DeSena.
- The Damian Wayne incarnation of Robin appears in films set in the DC Animated Movie Universe (DCAMU), voiced by Stuart Allan. Dick Grayson as Nightwing also appears, voiced by Sean Maher.
- The Damian Wayne incarnation of Robin appears in Batman Unlimited: Mechs vs. Mutants, voiced by Lucien Dodge. Dick Grayson as Nightwing also appears, voiced by Will Friedle.
- The Dick Grayson incarnation of Robin appears in Batman: Return of the Caped Crusaders and Batman vs. Two-Face, with Burt Ward reprising the role.
- The Dick Grayson incarnation of Robin appears in The Lego Batman Movie, voiced by Michael Cera.
- Dick Grayson as Nightwing appears in Batman and Harley Quinn, voiced again by Loren Lester.
- Dick Grayson as Nightwing, Jason Todd as Red Hood, Tim Drake as Red Robin, and Damian Wayne as Robin appear in Batman Ninja, with Dick voiced by Adam Croasdell, Jason and Damian by Yuri Lowenthal, and Tim by Will Friedle.
- The Teen Titans Go! incarnation of Dick Grayson / Robin appears in Teen Titans Go! To the Movies, with Scott Menville reprising his role and Jacob Jeffries providing his singing voice for the song "My Superhero Movie".
- Young, alternate universe variants of Dick Grayson, Jason Todd, and Tim Drake appear in Batman: Gotham by Gaslight, respectively voiced by Lincoln Melcher, Grey DeLisle, and Tara Strong.
- The Damian Wayne incarnation of Robin appears in Batman vs. Teenage Mutant Ninja Turtles, voiced by Ben Giroux.
- The Teen Titans Go! and Teen Titans incarnations of Dick Grayson / Robin appear in Teen Titans Go! vs. Teen Titans, with both voiced by Scott Menville. The DCAMU variant of Dick as Nightwing also appears, with Sean Maher reprising the role.
- The Damian Wayne incarnation of Robin appears in Injustice, voiced by Zach Callison. Dick Grayson as Nightwing also appears, voiced by Derek Phillips, and becomes Deadwing after being killed in a battle with Damian.
- The Teen Titans Go! incarnation of Dick Grayson / Robin appears in Teen Titans Go! & DC Super Hero Girls: Mayhem in the Multiverse, voiced again by Scott Menville.
- The Damian Wayne incarnation of Robin appears in Batman and Superman: Battle of the Super Sons, voiced by Jack Griffo.
- The Damian Wayne incarnation of Robin, referred to as "Little Batman", appears in Merry Little Batman, voiced by Yonas Kibreab.
- Dick Grayson appears in Batman: The Doom That Came to Gotham, voiced by Jason Marsden.
- The Dick Grayson incarnation of Robin appears in Justice League: Crisis on Infinite Earths, voiced by Zach Callison.
- The Damian Wayne incarnation of Robin appeared in Batman Ninja vs. Yakuza League, voiced by Yuki Kaji in Japanese and Bryson Baugus in English.
- The Dick Grayson and Jason Todd incarnations of Robin will appear in the stop-motion animated DC Studios film Dynamic Duo, respectively voiced by Mason Thames and Logan Kim. The film is scheduled to be released on September 22, 2028. It is being directed by Arthur Mintz and was written by Matthew Aldrich and the writing team of Scott Neustadter and Michael H. Weber.
- The Tim Drake incarnation of Robin appears in Batman: Knightfall, voiced by Jack Griffo.

== Video games ==
- The Tim Drake incarnation of Robin appears in Batman: Dark Tomorrow, voiced by Jonathan Roumie.
- The Dick Grayson, Tim Drake, and Damian Wayne incarnations of Robin appear in the Lego Batman series, Lego Dimensions, and Lego DC Super-Villains, with Dick voiced by Cam Clarke, Tim voiced by Charlie Schlatter, and Damian voiced by Stuart Allan.
- The Dick Grayson and Tim Drake incarnations of Robin appear in DC Universe Online, voiced by Joey Hood and Wil Wheaton respectively.
- Tim Drake / Robin and Dick Grayson / Nightwing appear in Young Justice: Legacy, voiced again by Jesse McCartney and Cameron Bowen.
- The Dick Grayson, Jason Todd, and Tim Drake incarnations of Robin appear in the Batman: Arkham series. Dick is voiced by Quinton Flynn in Batman: Arkham City, Josh Keaton in Batman: Arkham Origins (Multiplayer Mode only) and Batman: Arkham Shadow, and by Scott Porter in Batman: Arkham Knight, Tim is voiced by Troy Baker in Arkham City and by Matthew Mercer in Arkham Knight, and Jason is voiced by Troy Baker.
- The Dick Grayson and Damian Wayne incarnations of Nightwing appear in the Injustice series. Dick is voiced by Troy Baker in Injustice: Gods Among Us. Damian is voiced by Neal McDonough in Injustice: Gods Among Us, and by Scott Porter in Injustice 2. Jason Todd as the Red Hood appears as a DLC character in Injustice 2, voiced by Cameron Bowen.
- Dick Grayson as Nightwing appears in DC Battle Arena, voiced by P. M. Seymour.
- The Tim Drake incarnation of Robin, Dick Grayson as Nightwing, and Jason Todd as Red Hood appear as playable characters in Gotham Knights, respectively voiced by Sloane Siegel, Christopher Sean, and Stephen Oyoung.

== Merchandise ==
Lego produced a Lego Batman line of licensed sets in 2006, and a second Lego Super Heroes line in 2012. The 7783-The Batcave: The Penguin and Mr. Freeze's Invasion set features the Tim Drake version of Robin in his classic costume with a mini speedboat, as well as the 2012 version 6860-The Batcave which features Tim Drake's Robin in his red and black costume. 7785-Arkham Asylum includes Nightwing and his motorcycle as well. Set 6857-The Dynamic Duo Funhouse Escape also features the newer red and black Robin figure. Lego has also released a Robin minifigure (also Tim Drake), based on his appearance from Batman: Arkham City. In 2014, the Damian Wayne incarnation was released in a new set.

Minifigures of Dick Grayson as both Robin and Nightwing have been released in various Super Heroes sets. His variations as Robin include appearances based on The New 52, Teen Titans, Batman, and The Lego Batman Movie. His variations as Nightwing include appearances based on The New 52, DC Rebirth and The Lego Batman Movie.

Minifigures of Jason Todd, as both Robin and Red Hood, both in their New 52 variations, have also been released.

== Radio ==
During radio broadcasts of The Adventures of Superman radio drama Batman and Robin were paired with Superman over the years from September 15, 1945, to 1949. The pairing was pure novelty. The Batman and Robin appearances provided time off for Bud Collyer, the voice of Superman on radio. These episodes called for Superman to be occupied elsewhere and the crime fighting would be handled by Batman and Robin. On that series the voice of Robin was played by Ronald Liss.

== Music video ==
Eminem portrays Robin in his song "Without Me"; in the video, Robin and Blade (played by Dr. Dre) have to save a teenager from danger. Eminem portrays a number of other characters in this song.
