= James Tucker (animator) =

American animator and film producer

- Tucker in 2018
- Citizenship: United States
- Occupations: Producer, animator, director, writer
- Years active: 1992–present
- Notable work: DC Universe Animated Original Movies; Warner Bros. Animation
- Awards: Daytime Emmy Award – Special Class Animated Program; 2001 Batman Beyond

James Tucker is an American animator, writer, director and producer. He has worked on numerous DC Universe Animated Original Movies often alongside Bruce Timm, and on Warner Bros. Animation films and television shows. He has worked on shows such as Animaniacs, Tiny Toon Adventures, and Superman: The Animated Series, where he worked as a character designer. In 2001, he shared the Special Class Animated Program Daytime Emmy Award with Timm and others for Batman Beyond.

Tucker worked on Batman: The Brave and the Bold. In March 2013, he was named the supervising producer of the DC Animated Movie Universe, taking over from Bruce Timm. In October of that year, he mentioned that a new Wonder Woman film was "probably" on the way. In 2020, he worked with other industry professionals as a juror for the non-profit group Women in Animation reviewing the Class of 2020's best films. In 2020, IGN interviewed Tucker for the 20th anniversary of Batman Beyond, during which he praised the series' visual depiction of Gotham City. In July 2021, Tucker worked as a writer on the comic miniseries Justice League Infinity, a sequel to Justice League Unlimited. In 2024, Tucker produced the series Batman: Caped Crusader.

== Selected filmography ==
=== Film ===
Year	Title	Credited as
2013	Justice League: The Flashpoint Paradox	Producer
2013	Superman: Unbound	Director
2014	Justice League: War	Producer
2014	Son of Batman	Producer
2014	Batman: Assault on Arkham	Producer
2015	Batman vs. Robin	Producer
2015	Justice League: Throne of Atlantis	Producer
2015	Justice League: Gods and Monsters	Character designer
2016	Justice League vs. Teen Titans	Producer
2016	Batman: Bad Blood	Producer
2017	Batman vs. Two-Face	Writer, supervising producer
2017	Teen Titans: The Judas Contract	Supervising producer
2018	The Death of Superman	Producer
2018	Suicide Squad: Hell to Pay	Executive producer
2019	Wonder Woman: Bloodlines	Producer
2019	Reign of the Supermen	Executive producer
2019	Batman: Hush	Executive producer
2019	Wonder Woman: Bloodlines	Producer
2020	Justice League Dark: Apokolips War	Executive producer

=== Television ===
Year	Title	Credited as
1992	Tiny Toon Adventures	Animator
1992	Animaniacs	Animator
1996–1997	Superman: The Animated Series	Character designer
2001–2004	Justice League	Character designer, timing director
2004–2006	Justice League Unlimited	Character designer
2006	Legion of Super Heroes	Producer, director, character designer
2008–2011	Batman: The Brave and the Bold	Character designer
2015	Vixen	Director
2022	Teen Titans Go!	Supervising producer
2024	Batman: Caped Crusader	Executive producer
