= Batman: Bad Blood =

2016 animated superhero film directed by Jay Oliva

- Blu-ray cover art
- Directed by: Jay Oliva
- Screenplay by: J.M. DeMatteis
- Based on: Batman Incorporated by Grant Morrison; Cameron Stewart; Frazer Irving
- Produced by: James Tucker
- Starring: Jason O'Mara; Yvonne Strahovski; Stuart Allan; Sean Maher; Morena Baccarin
- Edited by: Christopher D. Lozinski
- Music by: Frederik Wiedmann
- Production companies: Warner Bros. Animation; DC Entertainment; The Answer Studio (animation services)
- Distributed by: Warner Home Video
- Release dates: January 20, 2016 (digital); February 2, 2016 (physical)
- Running time: 72 minutes
- Country: United States
- Language: English

Batman: Bad Blood is a 2016 American animated superhero film which is the 25th film of the DC Universe Animated Original Movies and the sixth film in the DC Animated Movie Universe. It serves as a sequel to the 2015 film Batman vs. Robin. The film was released on January 20, 2016, for iTunes and the Google Play Store, and on DVD and Blu-ray on February 2. While not a direct adaptation of a particular storyline, it derived from Grant Morrison's run on Batman, primarily the Leviathan story arcs.

Jason O'Mara, Sean Maher, and Stuart Allan reprise their roles from the previous films as Batman, Nightwing, and Robin, with Morena Baccarin returning from Son of Batman as Talia al Ghul, while Yvonne Strahovski joins as Batwoman.

== Plot ==
Six months after the defeat of the Court of Owls, (Note: As depicted in Batman vs. Robin (2015).) Batwoman intercepts a crowd of criminals in Gotham City that includes Electrocutioner, Tusk, Firefly, and Killer Moth. When a fight ensues, Batman arrives. They are confronted by the apparent leader of the criminals, a masked man calling himself the "Heretic", who reminds Batman of his vision of his son Damian Wayne as Batman. Alongside his subordinate Onyx Adams, the Heretic detonates explosives planted within the facility. Batman flings Batwoman to safety and apparently dies in the explosion.

Two weeks later, a concerned Alfred Pennyworth sends a distress signal to Nightwing. Meanwhile, at a monastery in the Himalayas, Bruce's twelve-year-old son Damian watches a news report of Batman's disappearance and sets out to return to Gotham. Batwoman's civilian alter-ego and Bruce's cousin Kate Kane meets with her father and Bruce's Uncle Colonel Jacob Kane explaining she feels responsible for Batman's apparent death, as his sacrifice reminds her of the childhood trauma she still carries. In the past, Kate, her sister Beth, and her mother Gabrielle were abducted and held for ransom. When her father attempted to rescue the three, both Beth and Gabrielle were killed, leaving Kate as the sole survivor. Kate later joined the military, but was discharged for unstated reasons. After her expulsion, she began frequenting nightclubs and overindulging in promiscuous sex and drugs. One night as she left a nightclub in a heavily impaired state, she was attacked, but was saved at the last minute by Batman. This experience motivated her to become Batwoman.

Batman apparently resurfaces and is quickly noticed by Robin and Batwoman (Robin discovered that Batwoman is Kate and that she is his cousin). Both of them intercept Batman and deduce that it is Nightwing wearing an older version of the Batsuit. They begin their own investigations into the Heretic, unconvinced that Bruce is truly dead. The Heretic and his henchmen attack Wayne Enterprises, forcing Lucius Fox to open the way into the vault by threatening his son Luke. Though Nightwing and Robin arrive, they are unable to prevent the Heretic from escaping with Wayne technology, and Lucius is injured. Before they leave, the Heretic kills Electrocutioner when he is about to kill Robin.

The Heretic returns to his headquarters where it is revealed that he is working for Damian's mother, Talia al Ghul. (Note: Last seen in the 2014 film Son of Batman.) They are holding Bruce prisoner and the Mad Hatter is slowly trying to brainwash him. The Heretic breaks into the Batcave and kidnaps Robin, revealing himself as a clone of Damian created by a genetics program run by Ra's al Ghul and the League of Shadows. He wishes to have Damian's memories and personality to feel like a real person, but Talia arrives and kills him for defying her orders, much to Damian's anger. Nightwing and Batwoman then arrive, having located Damian through a tracker in his costume. They are joined by Luke, clad in an exosuit designed by his father and styling himself as Batwing. The three rescue Bruce and Damian, but Talia and most of her henchmen escape.

A week passes and Bruce seems to have recovered, though he remains adamant that Kate and Luke should not be involved. After Kate is forced to fight her father after he suddenly attacks her for no reason, Dick realizes that Bruce is still under the effects of the Mad Hatter's mind control (and he's brainwash Jacob). Luke realizes that the League of Shadows are planning to brainwash world leaders at a tech summit held by Bruce.

As the brainwashing takes place, Nightwing, Robin, Batwoman, Alfred, and Batwing arrive and fight Talia and her henchmen. During the fight, the Calculator is killed by Alfred, interrupting the mind control and killing the Mad Hatter in the process as well. Batman, still brainwashed, defeats Nightwing. Talia orders him to kill Nightwing and Robin, but thanks to a speech Nightwing gave, Batman resists the brainwashing. Incensed, Talia escapes in a vessel only for Onyx to confront and attack her to avenge the Heretic's death. The vessel crashes and explodes, with the two being presumed dead. Bruce is later seen comforting Damian over his mother's supposed death. Alfred remarks to Dick that despite Talia's madness, she was still Damian's mother.

As the Bat-Signal shines in Gotham City, Batwoman, Batwing, and Nightwing meet Batman and Robin on top of the police station for their nightly patrol, the former two now officially part of the team. When everyone arrives, they notice a robbery in progress down the street being committed by the Penguin, and head off to stop him. On a nearby building, Batgirl observes the group and prepares to join the pursuit. (Note: The character returns in the 2019 film Batman: Hush.)

== Voice cast ==
Voice actor	Character
Jason O'Mara	Bruce Wayne / Batman
Yvonne Strahovski	Kate Kane / Batwoman
Stuart Allan	Damian Wayne / Robin
Sean Maher	Dick Grayson / Nightwing / Batman II
Morena Baccarin	Talia al Ghul
Steve Blum	Black Mask; Firefly
Gaius Charles	Luke Fox / Batwing
John DiMaggio	Blockbuster; Tusk
Robin Atkin Downes	Jervis Tetch / Mad Hatter; Electrocutioner
James Garrett	Alfred Pennyworth
Ernie Hudson	Lucius Fox
Christine Lakin	Reporter
Vanessa Marshall	Renee Montoya
Richard McGonagle	President of the United States
Matthew Mercer	Hellhound; Chuckie Sol
Geoff Pierson	Colonel Jacob Kane
Jason Spisak	Noah Kuttler / Calculator; Killer Moth; Male Reporter
Bruce Thomas	Commissioner James Gordon
Kari Wahlgren	Kori; Ms. Bannister
Travis Willingham	Hafid al Ghul / the Heretic

== Reception ==
=== Critical reception ===
The review aggregator Rotten Tomatoes reported an approval rating of 100%, with an average score of 7.6/10, based on 5 reviews. Critics praised its characters, fight scenes, and nods to long-time fans. The film's complex storyline and intense action were also highlighted. Scott Mendelson's review for Forbes highlighted the film's strong action sequences and the introduction of new characters. He found the film entertaining and saw potential in its approach for future animated and live-action projects, though he criticized the repetitive use of certain villains and wished for more exploration of Gotham's reaction to Batman's presumed death. Andrew Pollard of Starburst applauded Batman: Bad Blood for its cinematic style, action-packed scenes, and the introduction of Batwoman. Pollard praised the film for its strong character dynamics, particularly between Dick Grayson and Damian. While Pollard acknowledged the sharp dialogue and atmospheric portrayal of Gotham, it critiqued the potential overcrowding of characters and a perceived lack of focus on Batman himself.

=== Sales ===
The film earned $4,806,737 from domestic home video sales.
