= Nightwing =

DC Comics superhero

- Variant cover art of Nightwing (April 2026 vol.4) #137 from DC Comics; Art by David Nakayama.

Publication information
- Publisher: DC Comics
- First appearance: Superman #158 (January 1963)
- Created by: Superman: Edmond Hamilton; Curt Swan; Dick Grayson: Marv Wolfman; George Pérez

In-story information
- Alter ego: Clark Kent / Kal-El; Richard Grayson; Christopher Kent; Kara Zor-L / Karen Starr; Van-Zee List: Alternate universes: Damian Wayne Ronan Kent

Nightwing is a codename used by multiple characters appearing in American comic books published by DC Comics. Since its debut in Superman #158 (January 1963), the codename has been tied to both Superman and Batman comic book titles and characters. Originally, the usage of the codename originated from Superman acting as a vigilante in Kandor, naming himself after an alien bird species from Krypton. The name would also become associated with a relative of Superman in Kandor, Van-Zee. Paralleling Batman and Robin, Nightwing is commonly associated with a sidekick, Flamebird.

Since Tales of the Teen Titans #44 (1984), the name has instead been primarily associated with Dick Grayson; when asserting his independence from Batman as a superhero and a young adult, the character is told the story of a legendary Kryptonian vigilante by Superman who was similarly disowned but used his talents to help others. Inspired by the story, Grayson adopts the codename for himself. The name is also adopted by Chris Kent (also known as Lor-Zod) in association with a protector god Nightwing created by chief god Rao. Several other characters also utilize the name alternately, including Power Girl in a Kandor-related storyline and Jason Todd in one storyline impersonating Grayson. Other versions of Nightwing have also appeared in non-canonical and alternate universe stories, including in other media.

As Nightwing, in 2013, Dick Grayson's version placed 5th on IGN's Top 25 Heroes of DC Comics and Grayson as Nightwing was ranked the #1 Sexiest Male Character in Comics by ComicsAlliance in 2013.

== Fictional character biography ==
=== Clark Kent / Kal-El ===
Superman as Nightwing. From Superman #158 (1963). Art by Curt Swan.

The Nightwing identity first appeared in ''Superman'' #158 (1963), in which Superman assumes the name while operating as a vigilante in Kandor. In Superman's Pal, Jimmy Olsen #69 (June 1963), "The Dynamic Duo of Kandor" introduces Nightwing's dog Nighthound. In "The Feud Between Batman and Superman" in World's Finest #143 (August 1964), Batman and Robin themselves visit Kandor with Superman and Olsen and the two Dynamic Duos team up.

Post-Crisis, in 2001's Superman: The Man of Steel #111, Superman and Lois Lane travel to a version of Krypton later revealed to have been created by the villainous Brainiac 13 and based on Jor-El's favorite period in Kryptonian history. Labeled as criminals, Superman and Lois become fugitives, adopting the Nightwing and Flamebird identities to survive, just as had Superman and Olsen in Superman (vol. 2) #158.

=== Richard "Dick" Grayson ===
Dick Grayson first adopts the Nightwing identity in ''Tales of the Teen Titans'' #44 (1984), following his decision to retire as Robin. The new persona allows him to continue crimefighting while establishing a distinct heroic identity. He frequently collaborates with other heroes and eventually receives his own solo series in 1995. Following Bruce Wayne's apparent death, Grayson temporarily assumes the role of Batman before returning to his Nightwing persona. Nightwing's costume is designed for agility and stealth, incorporating lightweight armor and a utility belt with essential gadgets. His primary weapons are twin escrima sticks made of a high-durability polymer, which can be used for both offense and defense. In some versions, these sticks can link to form a staff or function as grappling tools. His suit often includes smoke pellets, throwing discs, tracking devices, and other tools tailored to infiltration and acrobatic combat.

=== Christopher "Chris" Kent ===
The son of General Zod and his lieutenant and lover, Ursa, Lor-Zod was conceived and born in the Phantom Zone, granting him a mutated genetic structure and corporeal form in the Phantom Zone. Used to spearhead an invasion by Zod, he instead forged a strong bond with Superman and Lois Lane, who renamed him "Christopher" and would gain a new life on Earth from the hardships caused by his biological parents. After an accelerated growth spurt, he first adopted the Nightwing codename as a costume vigilante in New Krypton (Kandor) but became more significant following his bonding with the Kryptonian deity of the same name, possessing his powers over shadows and awareness.

== Other versions ==
- Several characters would impersonate Dick Grayson's persona as Nightwing:
  - Terry McGinnis briefly moonlights as Nightwing in Batman Beyond #4, after Detective Ben Singleton claims to know Dick Grayson's past as Nightwing, which turns into a media fiasco.
  - Jason Todd briefly impersonated Nightwing, wearing Dick's costume and killing in New York City which led to a police manhunt against Nightwing.
  - Batman once adopted the suit and name while Dick Grayson left Blüdhaven to cure his fear of heights.
- In the DC Comics Tangent Comics series, "Nightwing" is a secret government organization which appears throughout the series. Headed by Marcus Moore and Francis "Black Lightning" Powell, who act to protect the US and also conceal the true nature of Atom's involvement in the Cuban Missile Crisis.

=== Kryptonian vigilantes ===
- In pre-Crisis continuity, Van-Zee and Ak-Var assumed the Nightwing and Flamebird identities respectively to fight crime in Kandor; this version is a distant relative of Superman and twin brother of Dik-Zee whom he shares an uncanny resemblance with (with Jor-El, Superman, Van-Zee, and Dik-Zee all sharing a resemblance). Infatuated with Lois Lane, her rejection leads to him search for a woman resembling her in kind, leading him to Midwestern heriess Sylvia DeWitt. With the pair falling in love, they eventually bore twins and settled on Venus, renaming it "Urth".
- Following Crisis on Infinite Earths, the Nightwing name is associated with an unnamed Kryptonian hero. Several hundred years before the birth of Kal-El, there was a Kryptonian man who was cast out from his family and decided to take on crime as the vigilante Nightwing, whose crimefighting tactics were similar to Batman's. When Superman tells Dick Grayson of this story, Dick takes the name for himself.
- Power Girl used the Nightwing identity in a Kandor-based storyline.

=== Kryptonian deity ===
Nightwing is a fictional deity based in Kryptonian legends in American comic books published by DC Comics and debuted in Action Comics #886. Created by Rao, he is one of the three siblings tasked as protectors of Krypton, particularly rooting out evil and corruption but is the loneliest of all Rao's children. Only able to be seen by fellow god and brother, Vohc, his elder brother sought to ease him and allow him to be visible seen and introduces him to sister-goddess Flamebird. The pair would possess a strong bond, which secretly made Vohc jealous. After his tribute to Flamebird was destroyed despite his pleas, his next creation would imprison Nightwing himself and Vohc offered an ultimatum of either accepting his love to free Nightwing or to deny it and leave him trapped. With Flamebird unable to do the former, Nightwing is tapped in for thousands of years. Nightwing is eventually freed after Chris was imprisoned by Jax-Ur (the avatar of Vohc) and the deity merges with Chris.

== In other media ==
=== Television ===
- Nightwing appears in the DC Animated Universe, voiced by Loren Lester.
  - Nightwing appears in The New Batman Adventures. Additionally, a spin-off focused on him and Catwoman was considered at one point before being shelved.
  - Nightwing's costume makes cameo appearances in Batman Beyond, being on display in the Batcave. In the episode "Lost Soul", Terry McGinnis borrows the Nightwing mask to protect his identity after his Batsuit is stolen.
  - Nightwing makes a non-speaking cameo appearance in the Justice League Unlimited episode "Grudge Match".
- An alternate timeline version of Nightwing appears in the Teen Titans episode "How Long is Forever?", voiced by Scott Menville.
- Nightwing appears in The Batman episode "Artifacts", voiced by Jerry O'Connell.
- Nightwing appears in Batman: The Brave and the Bold, voiced by Crawford Wilson.
- A Nightwing animated series was in development before being shelved in favor of Young Justice.
- Nightwing appears in Young Justice, voiced by Jesse McCartney. This version is the leader of the Team, before leaving by the end of the second season, Invasion, and joining the Outsiders.
- Nightwing appears in Teen Titans Go!, voiced again by Scott Menville.
- Nightwing appears in Titans, portrayed by Brenton Thwaites.
- Nightwing appears in Harley Quinn, voiced by Harvey Guillén. This version initially struggles to cooperate with the Bat Family, until they are forced to brave the Riddler's escape room alongside Harley Quinn and her crew. In the fourth season, he is killed by a sleep-deprived Harley, with the Joker taking credit. He is resurrected by Talia al Ghul in the season finale "Killer's Block", and swears to get revenge on Harley.
- Nightwing appears in Batwheels, voiced by Zachary Gordon.
- Nightwing appears in the Robot Chicken episode "May Cause a Squeakquel", voiced by Will Friedle.

=== Film ===
==== Live action ====
===== Schumacher Batman films =====
Chris O'Donnell portrays Dick Grayson in Batman Forever and Batman & Robin. In Forever, Dick considers "Nightwing" as his alias. In the character's second appearance within the film series, he pursues being a vigilante on his own and wears the Nightwing costume design, though keeping the Robin alias and cape.

===== DC Extended Universe =====
- Nightwing was considered to appear in Batman v Superman: Dawn of Justice, portrayed by Adam Driver, but was ultimately scrapped.
- Warner Bros. Pictures was developing a Nightwing live-action film centered on the character, set in the DC Extended Universe, with Bill Dubuque writing the script and The Lego Batman Movie director Chris McKay signed on to direct. Discussing why he likes the character and signed on for the project, McKay cited the character's showman personality and background as an entertainer and expressed his excitement for depicting that in the film. He later stated that he wants to introduce a complete adaptation of the character, something that hasn't been done in previous film interpretations of him before. McKay continued to state that the director-driven approach is why he loves Warner Bros., and how the franchise is differentiating itself from other popular shared universes. McKay also confirmed that the film would acknowledge the titular character's past from the source material, including his time as a part of Haly's Circus, and also reaffirmed that the film will be a straightforward action film with minimal use of CGI special effects and grounded realism. Although the script was nearing its final draft, McKay said in 2021 that the project was delayed due to DC having "other priorities", but also reaffirmed his intentions to still make the film. He also said that the film could possibly be reworked to remove its connections to the DCEU continuity. In August 2023, Umberto Gonzalez of TheWrap reported that it had been cancelled.

==== Animation ====
- Nightwing appears in Batman: Under the Red Hood, voiced by Neil Patrick Harris.
- Nightwing appears in the DC Animated Movie Universe, voiced by Sean Maher. This version is the leader of the Teen Titans. In Justice League Dark: Apokolips War, he is killed by Parademons before Robin revives him using a Lazarus Pit.
- Nightwing appears in the Batman Unlimited film series, voiced by Will Friedle.
- Nightwing appears in Lego DC Comics Super Heroes: Justice League – Gotham City Breakout, voiced again by Will Friedle.
- Nightwing appears in Batman and Harley Quinn, voiced again by Loren Lester.
- A Feudal Japan version of Nightwing appears in Batman Ninja, voiced by Adam Croasdell.
- Nightwing appears in Lego DC Batman: Family Matters, voiced again by Will Friedle.
- Nightwing appears in Teen Titans Go! vs. Teen Titans, voiced again by Sean Maher.
- Nightwing appears in Injustice, voiced by Derek Phillips.
- The Batman Ninja version of Nightwing appears in Batman Ninja vs. Yakuza League, voiced by Houston Hayes.
- Nightwing appears in Batman: Knightfall, voiced by Mike Prater.

=== Video games ===
- Nightwing appears as a playable character in Batman: Rise of Sin Tzu, voiced again by Loren Lester.
- Nightwing appears in DC Universe Online, voiced by Joey Hood.
- Nightwing appears as a playable character in Lego Batman: The Videogame, voiced by James Arnold Taylor.
- Nightwing appears as a playable character in Batman: Arkham City, voiced by Quinton Flynn.
- Nightwing appears as a playable character in Lego Batman 2: DC Super Heroes, voiced by Cam Clarke.
- Nightwing appears in Young Justice: Legacy, voiced again by Jesse McCartney.
- Nightwing appears as a playable character in Infinite Crisis.
- Nightwing appears as a playable character in Injustice: Gods Among Us, voiced by Troy Baker. Additionally, Damian Wayne as Nightwing appears as a playable character, voiced by Neal McDonough.
- Nightwing appears as an NPC in Scribblenauts Unmasked: A DC Comics Adventure.
- Nightwing appears as a playable character in Lego Batman 3: Beyond Gotham, voiced by Josh Keaton.
- Nightwing appears as a playable character in Batman: Arkham Knight, voiced by Scott Porter.
- The Lego Batman Movie version of Nightwing appears as a playable character in Lego Dimensions.
- Damian Wayne as Nightwing appears in Injustice 2, voiced by Scott Porter.
- Nightwing appears as a playable character in DC Legends.
- Nightwing appears as a playable character in Lego DC Super-Villains, voiced by Matthew Mercer.
- Nightwing appears in DC Battle Arena, voiced by P. M. Seymour.
- Nightwing appears as a playable character in Gotham Knights, voiced by Christopher Sean.
- Nightwing appears as a playable character in Lego Batman: Legacy of the Dark Knight, voiced by Hyoie O'Grady.

=== Miscellaneous ===
- Barbara Gordon as Nightwing appears in Smallville: Season 11. This version is a police officer for the Gotham City Police Department.
- Nightwing appears in the Injustice: Gods Among Us prequel comic. After being accidentally killed by Damian Wayne, he is given Deadman's powers and takes on his mantle.

=== Rides ===
A Nightwing ride is currently in operation at Six Flags New England.
