= Ryan Caulfield: Year One =

- Created by: James DeMonaco; Kevin Fox
- Starring: Sean Maher
- Composer: Joseph Vitarelli
- Country of origin: United States
- Original language: English
- No. of seasons: 1
- No. of episodes: 8 (6 unaired)

Production
- Running time: 60 minutes
- Production companies: Mandeville Films (uncredited); Iron Horse Pictures; Shadowland Productions; Nucleus Entertainment; Hyde Park Entertainment; Regency Television; Fox Television Studios

Original release
- Network: Fox
- Release: October 15 – October 22, 1999

Ryan Caulfield: Year One is an American crime drama created by James DeMonaco and Kevin Fox for Fox which aired from October 15 to October 22, 1999. The series' original title was going to be The Badland, and an article appeared in the 1999 Fall Preview edition of TV Guide under that name.

== Premise ==
Ryan Caulfield is a 19-year-old cop who is assigned to one of Philadelphia's toughest areas.

== Cast ==
- Sean Maher as Ryan Caulfield
- Richard Portnow as Sgt. Palermo
- Roselyn Sánchez as Kim Veras
- Michael Rispoli as Vincent Susser
- James Roday Rodriguez as Vic
- Chad Lindberg as Phil Harkins
- Clifton Powell as Lt. Vaughn
- Brenda Bakke as Mrs. Caulfield

== Episodes ==
No.	Title	Directed by	Written by	Original release date	Prod. code
1	"Pilot"	F. Gary Gray	James DeMonaco & Kevin Fox	October 15, 1999	05-99-100
Ryan Caulfield joins the police squad straight out of high school. Six people have been murdered by a heroin dealer, including a fellow officer.
2	"A Night at the Gashole"	James Whitmore, Jr.	David Graziano	October 22, 1999	05-99-103
Vic refuses to identify the criminal who shot him. Ryan agrees to go out on a double date with Susser and the woman of his dreams.
3	"Po-Piggity and Other Racial Slurs"	TBD	James DeMonaco & Kevin Fox	Unaired	05-99-101
4	"Sex and St. Michael"	TBD	William Schmidt	Unaired	05-99-102
5	"Nocturnal Radius"	TBD	James DeMonaco	Unaired	05-99-104
6	"November Heat"	TBD	Jacqueline Zambrano	Unaired	05-99-105
7	"Absolution"	TBD	Joe Bosso	Unaired	05-99-106
8	"Bluefellas"	TBD	Anne McGrail	Unaired	05-99-107

In addition, a ninth episode, entitled "King of Hearts", was written by Ted Mann, but was not produced.

== Reception ==
In its season premiere, the show attracted 4.48 million viewers and a 1.7 rating, 6 share, in adults 18-49 resulting in Fox's lowest regular-season 18-49 rating in the slot since at least 1994. The show was cancelled after its second episode.
