= Son of Batman =

2014 animated feature film directed by Ethan Spaulding

- Home video release cover art
- Directed by: Ethan Spaulding
- Screenplay by: Joe R. Lansdale
- Story by: James Robinson
- Based on: Batman and Son by Grant Morrison; Andy Kubert
- Produced by: James Tucker
- Starring: Stuart Allan; Jason O'Mara; Thomas Gibson; Morena Baccarin
- Edited by: Christopher D. Lozinski
- Music by: Frederik Wiedmann
- Production companies: Warner Bros. Animation; DC Entertainment; The Answer Studio (animation services)
- Distributed by: Warner Home Video
- Release date: April 22, 2014
- Running time: 74 minutes
- Country: United States
- Language: English

Son of Batman is a 2014 American animated superhero film which is the 20th film of the DC Universe Animated Original Movies and the third film in the DC Animated Movie Universe. It is an adaptation of Grant Morrison and Andy Kubert's 2006 "Batman and Son" storyline. The film was released as a digital download on April 22, 2014, and was released on physical media on May 6.

== Plot ==
At the headquarters of the League of Assassins, Ra's al Ghul grooms Damian Wayne, the young son of his daughter Talia and Batman, to succeed him. The League is ambushed by a group of assassins led by Slade Wilson, Ra's al Ghul's initial choice for successor before Damian's birth. Ra's is fatally injured by Slade, dying before he can heal his injuries with the Lazarus Pit. After the incident, Talia takes Damian to Gotham City to meet his father and remain in his care while she and the League deal with Slade. The aggressive, highly independent Damian frequently disobeys his father's orders in an attempt to avenge Ra's himself. After Nightwing accosts him for brutally attacking an associate of Slade Ubu, Batman berates Damian for his recklessness and willingness to kill. Batman then has Damian don the mantle of Robin to teach him discipline.

Slade, now calling himself Deathstroke, captures Talia as well as Dr. Kirk Langstrom, a scientist previously working with Ra's. Commissioner Jim Gordon warns Batman about an abandoned stadium believed to house Deathstroke's men; after infiltrating the stadium, Batman and Damian attempt to question Langstrom, who initially refuses to leave as Deathstroke is holding his family hostage. When Damian becomes violently impatient and inadvertently alerts the enemy to their arrival, the group is confronted by a swarm of Man-Bats, which Langstrom explains is part of Deathstroke's plan to create superhuman flying assassins. While Nightwing works with Langstrom on an antidote for the Man-Bats, Batman and Damian set off to rescue Langstrom's family. Batman deduces that Talia has been abducted and Damian is relayed her location via a ransom video given to Langstrom's daughter.

Nightwing learns that Deathstroke is operating in an oil rig off the Scottish coast, and Damian goes to the rig alone to rescue his mother. He finds her in an underwater base with a swarm of Man-Bats and another Lazarus Pit, which Deathstroke intends to sell for profit. Deathstroke attempts to kill Damian, mortally wounding Talia as she shields her son from a gunshot. Batman arrives to assist and heals Talia in the Lazarus Pit, while Nightwing and Langstrom cure the Man-Bats.

After a brutal fight, Damian manages to defeat Deathstroke, but refuses to kill him because it is not what his father would do. The underwater base is destroyed when the disoriented Man-Bats break the glass elevator shaft. Batman, Talia, and Damian escape to safety, but the unconscious Deathstroke is left behind. (Note: The character returns in the 2017 film Teen Titans: The Judas Contract.) Discussing what to do with Damian now that Deathstroke has been neutralized, Batman believes that Damian should remain with him as Robin while Talia wishes to recreate the League with both of them at her side. Talia allows Damian to stay in Gotham with his father, but states her intention to return for him someday.

== Voice cast ==
Voice actor	Character
Jason O'Mara	Bruce Wayne / Batman
Stuart Allan	Damian Wayne / Robin
Thomas Gibson	Slade Wilson / Deathstroke
Morena Baccarin	Talia al Ghul
Sean Maher	Dick Grayson / Nightwing
David McCallum	Alfred Pennyworth
Giancarlo Esposito	Ra's al Ghul
Dee Bradley Baker	The Joker (cameo), Man-Bat commandos
Xander Berkeley	Dr. Kirk Langstrom
Diane Michelle	Francine Langstrom, Call Girl #1
Andrea Romano	Suit #2
Fred Tatasciore	Waylon Jones / Killer Croc, Dusan al Ghul
Bruce Thomas	James Gordon, Ubu
Kari Wahlgren	Rebecca Langstrom, Call Girl #2

== Soundtrack ==
Son of Batman (Music from the DC Universe Movie)

Film score by Frederik Wiedmann
- Released: May 20, 2014
- Length: 65:52
- Label: La-La Land Records

The soundtrack to Son of Batman was released on May 20, 2014, with music composed by Frederik Wiedmann.

Tracklist

Son of Batman (Music from the DC Universe Movie)
No.	Title	Length
1.	"Son of Batman"	0:56
2.	"Peace and War"	2:13
3.	"Deathstroke's Army"	3:41
4.	"Ashes to Ashes"	4:59
5.	"Gotham Crimes"	2:21
6.	"Souvenirs d'une Liaison"	1:34
7.	"Damian"	1:03
8.	"Gotham City"	1:13
9.	"Call Me Deathstroke"	2:40
10.	"Ninjas"	1:57
11.	"Asylum Interrogations"	1:50
12.	"Ambushed" (Limited edition's exclusive track)	1:54
13.	"Rogue"	3:45
14.	"Great Shoes to Fill"	2:51
15.	"Man-Bats"	1:42
16.	"The Spoiled Son" (Limited edition's exclusive track)	2:05
17.	"Father and Son"	1:52
18.	"Damian's Mission"	2:41
19.	"Off to Scotland"	2:52
20.	"Stand-Off"	2:19
21.	"Dr. Langstrom's Rescue"	2:36
22.	"Father Saves Son"	2:12
23.	"The Duel"	2:25
24.	"The Fall of the Empire"	1:51
25.	"Damian's Blade"	2:52
26.	"Farewell"	2:12
27.	"End Credits"	4:23
Total length:		65:52

== Reception ==
=== Critical reception ===
The review aggregator Rotten Tomatoes reported an approval rating of 64%, with an average score of 6.4/10, based on 11 reviews.

IGN gave the film a rating of 7.5 out of 10, saying that "Son of Batman finds the humor amidst the more adult-oriented action elements in this latest DC animated adventure". Common Sense Media gave the film a 4 star rating out of 5, saying that "violent and noirish Batman is engaging but cynical".

Conversely, Brian Lowry of Variety stated that "at times this feels like a sitcom premise — a chop-socky "Full House", or maybe, "Full Cave". Tommy Cook for Collider also gave the film a negative review: "Striving for the dark edge of what I guess people expect from a Batman movie while still maintaining that Saturday morning toon sheen, the film feels mass produced to appeal to all (give the adults – gore; the kids – a spunky child sidekick); however in the effort to appease everyone, SoB in fact caters to none".

=== Sales ===
The film earned $7,035,623 from domestic home video sales.

== Sequels ==
Three sequels were released including: Batman vs. Robin in 2015, Batman: Bad Blood in 2016, and Batman: Hush in 2019.
