= Jason O'Mara =

Irish actor (born 1972)

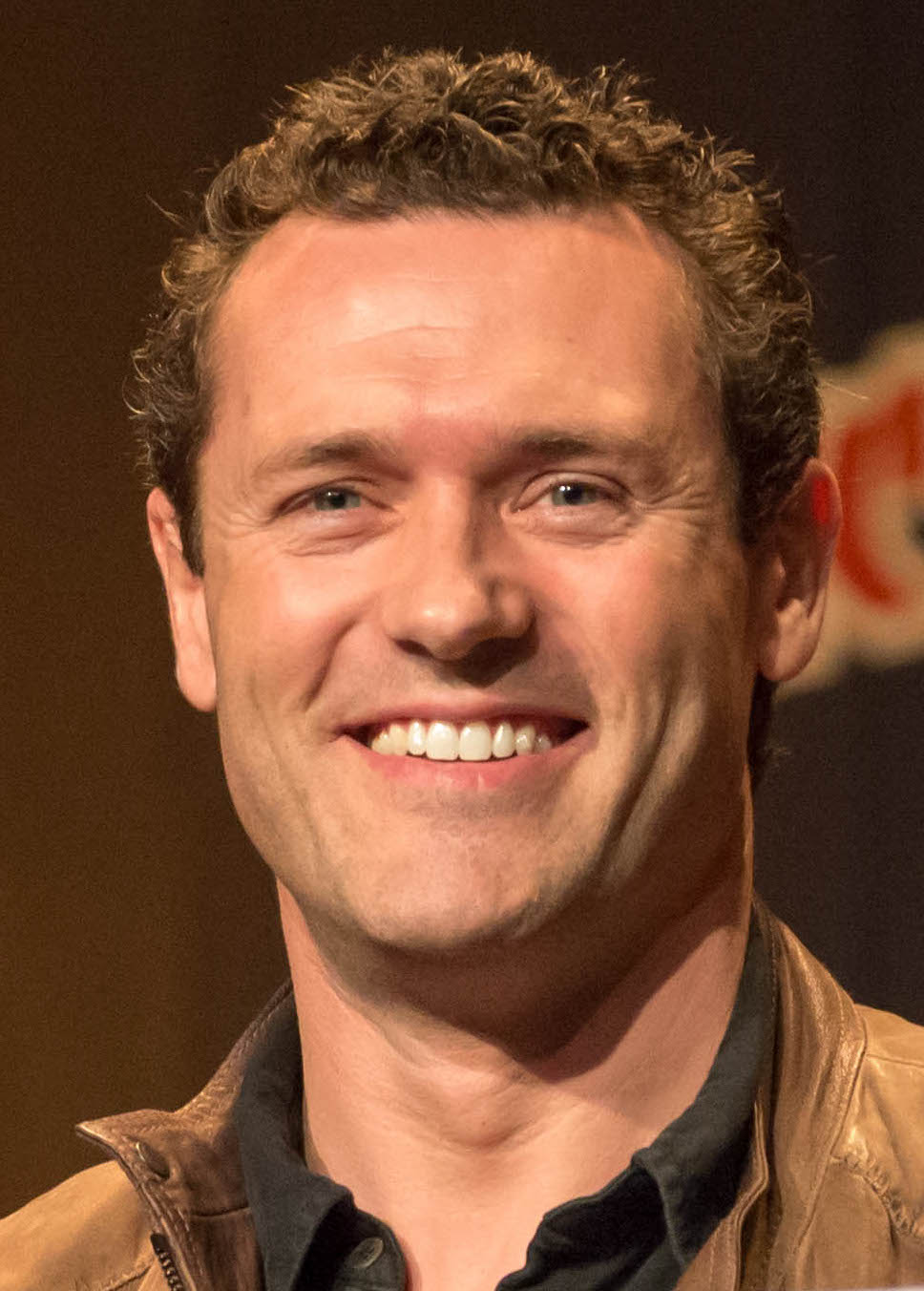
- O'Mara in 2015
- Born: 6 August 1972 (age 53); Dublin, Ireland
- Occupation: Actor
- Years active: 1995–present
- Spouse: Paige Turco (m. 2003; div. 2017)
- Children: 1
- Relatives: Rebecca O'Mara (sister)

Jason O'Mara (born 6 August 1972) is an Irish actor. He has starred in American television series Terra Nova (2011), Vegas (2012–13), Agents of S.H.I.E.L.D. (2016–17) and The Man in the High Castle (2018–19). For his performance in The Siege of Jadotville (2016), he won an Irish Film & Television Award for Best Supporting Actor.

O'Mara also provided the voice of Batman in the DC Animated Movie Universe (2013–20) and Zeus on the Netflix series Blood of Zeus (2020–present).

== Career ==
O'Mara performed with The Royal Shakespeare Company. His theatre work in London and Dublin included The Jew of Malta and Popcorn, and he was nominated for Best Supporting Actor in 2002 at the Irish Theatre Awards for his portrayal of John in Neil LaBute's Bash.

He appeared in Harold Pinter's The Homecoming in London and Dublin as well as Lincoln Center in New York. He had lead roles in other series, including The Agency, Band of Brothers, Monarch of the Glen, High Stakes, Playing the Field, The Bill, Berkeley Square, and Reach for the Moon.

He has starred as lead character Sam Tyler in the U.S. remake of the British series Life on Mars. He also played Jim Shannon, the lead role in the 2011 Fox TV series Terra Nova. He played Philip Marlowe in a 2007 pilot entitled Marlowe; that same year, he portrayed video game character Albert Wesker in Resident Evil: Extinction, the third film in the live-action Resident Evil film franchise, and the second sequel to Resident Evil.

O'Mara also played the role of George Washington in the History Channel miniseries Sons of Liberty (2015).

In both 2005 and 2008, O'Mara guest-starred on TNT's The Closer as Bill Croelick, a charming and psychotic man with a fixation on fire.

O'Mara also guest-starred in the Criminal Minds season two episode "The Last Word" as a serial killer. O'Mara appeared in One for the Money as Joe Morelli. He also appeared on Vegas as Jack Lamb.

O'Mara voiced Bruce Wayne / Batman in the DC Animated Movie Universe line of animated films, debuting in Justice League: War.

O'Mara joined the cast of Agents of S.H.I.E.L.D., where he portrayed Jeffrey Mace, the new director of S.H.I.E.L.D.

In October 2018, O'Mara joined the cast of The Man in the High Castle, where he portrays series regular Wyatt Price, a black market supplier of information.

In 2019, it was announced O'Mara would be starring in Netflix's Greek myth-influenced series Blood of Zeus as the god Zeus.

== Personal life ==
O'Mara was married to American actress Paige Turco from 2003 to 2017. They have a son together.

In 2009, O'Mara became an American citizen.

As of January 2026 O'Mara is engaged to fellow Irish actor Catherine Walker, whom he met in 2022.

== Filmography ==
=== Film ===
Year	Title	Role	Notes
1996	Space Truckers	Chopper #3	
2007	Resident Evil: Extinction	Albert Wesker	
2012	One for the Money	Joseph Morelli	
2013	In a World...	Terry Pouncer	
2014	Justice League: War	Bruce Wayne / Batman (voice)	Direct-to-video
2014	Son of Batman	Bruce Wayne / Batman (voice)	Direct-to-video
2015	Justice League: Throne of Atlantis	Bruce Wayne / Batman (voice)	Direct-to-video
2015	Batman vs. Robin	Bruce Wayne / Batman (voice)	Direct-to-video
2016	Batman: Bad Blood	Bruce Wayne / Batman (voice)	Direct-to-video
2016	Justice League vs. Teen Titans	Bruce Wayne / Batman (voice)	Direct-to-video
2016	The Siege of Jadotville	Jack Prendergast	
2016	Wakefield	Dirk Morrison	
2017	Justice League Dark	Bruce Wayne / Batman (voice)	Direct-to-video
2018	Metal Heart	Steve	
2018	The Death of Superman	Bruce Wayne / Batman (voice)	Direct-to-video
2019	Reign of the Supermen	Bruce Wayne / Batman (voice)	Direct-to-video
2019	Batman: Hush	Bruce Wayne / Batman (voice)	Direct-to-video
2020	Justice League Dark: Apokolips War	Bruce Wayne / Batman (voice)	Direct-to-video
2021	Hypnotic	Dr. Collin Meade	
2023	Your Lucky Day	Captain Rutledge	

=== Television ===
Year	Title	Role	Notes
1996	Soldier Soldier	Medic	Episode: "Deliver Us from Evil"
1997	Gobble	East Anglian Journalist	Television film
1997	Q.E.D.	Dr. Mills	Episode: "Cause of Death"
1998	Peak Practice	Billy Matters	2 episodes
1998	Berkeley Square	Ned Jones	10 episodes
1999	Unfinished Business	Donal	2 episodes
1999–2000	The Bill	D.C.I. Richard Pallister	4 episodes
2000	The Mrs Bradley Mysteries	Jasper Hicks	Episode: "The Worsted Viper"
2000–2002	Playing the Field	Lee Quinn	6 episodes
2001	Monarch of the Glen	Fergal MacClure	6 episodes
2001	High Stakes	Greg Hayden	12 episodes
2001	Band of Brothers	Thomas Meehan	2 episodes
2001	The Cassidys	Dominic	Episode: "Honey, I Haven't Even Started Yet"
2002	Eastwick	Daryl Van Horne	Television film
2002–2003	The Agency	A. B. Stiles	22 episodes
2004	CSI: Miami	Dr. Keith Winters	Episode: "Complications"
2005, 2008	The Closer	Bill Croelick	2 episodes
2006	In Justice	Charles Conti	13 episodes
2006	Criminal Minds	Mill Creek Killer	Episode: "The Last Word"
2006	Drift	Ray Hakansovich	Television film
2006–2008	Men in Trees	Stuart Maxson	5 episodes
2007	Marlowe	Philip Marlowe	Television film
2008	Grey's Anatomy	Phillip Robinson	2 episodes
2008–2009	Life on Mars	Detective Sam Tyler	18 episodes
2009	Trust Me	Stu Hoffman	Episode: "Before and After"
2010	Your Bad Self	unknown role	6 episodes
2011	Terra Nova	Jim Shannon	13 episodes
2012	Dakota	Berringer	2 episodes
2012–2013	Vegas	Deputy Jack Lamb	21 episodes
2013–2014	The Good Wife	Damian Boyle	4 episodes
2014	Republic of Doyle	Seth Rankin	Episode: "Dirty Deeds"
2015	Sons of Liberty	George Washington	3 episodes
2015	Complications	John Ellison	10 episodes
2016–2017	Agents of S.H.I.E.L.D.	Jeffrey Mace / Patriot	14 episodes
2018	Ballers	Coach Davis	Episode: "No Small Talk"
2018–2019	The Man in the High Castle	Wyatt Price	20 episodes
2020–2025	Blood of Zeus	Zeus / Elias (voice)	15 episodes
2021	Departure	Max O'Neill	5 episodes
2021	Truth Be Told	Joshua Keith	3 episodes
2022	The Midnight Club	Pale Man	Episode: "The Eternal Enemy"
2023	Smother	Paul Madigan	6 episodes
2023	Unicorn: Warriors Eternal	Otto	Episode: "The Mystery of Secrets"
2024	Fire Country	Liam	2 episodes
2025	Irish Blood	Declan Murphy	6 episodes
2026	The Lincoln Lawyer	Jack Gilroy	3 episodes

=== Web series ===
Year	Title	Role	Notes
2016	Agents of S.H.I.E.L.D.: Slingshot	Director Jeffrey Mace	Episode: "John Hancock"
