= Stuart Allan =

American actor

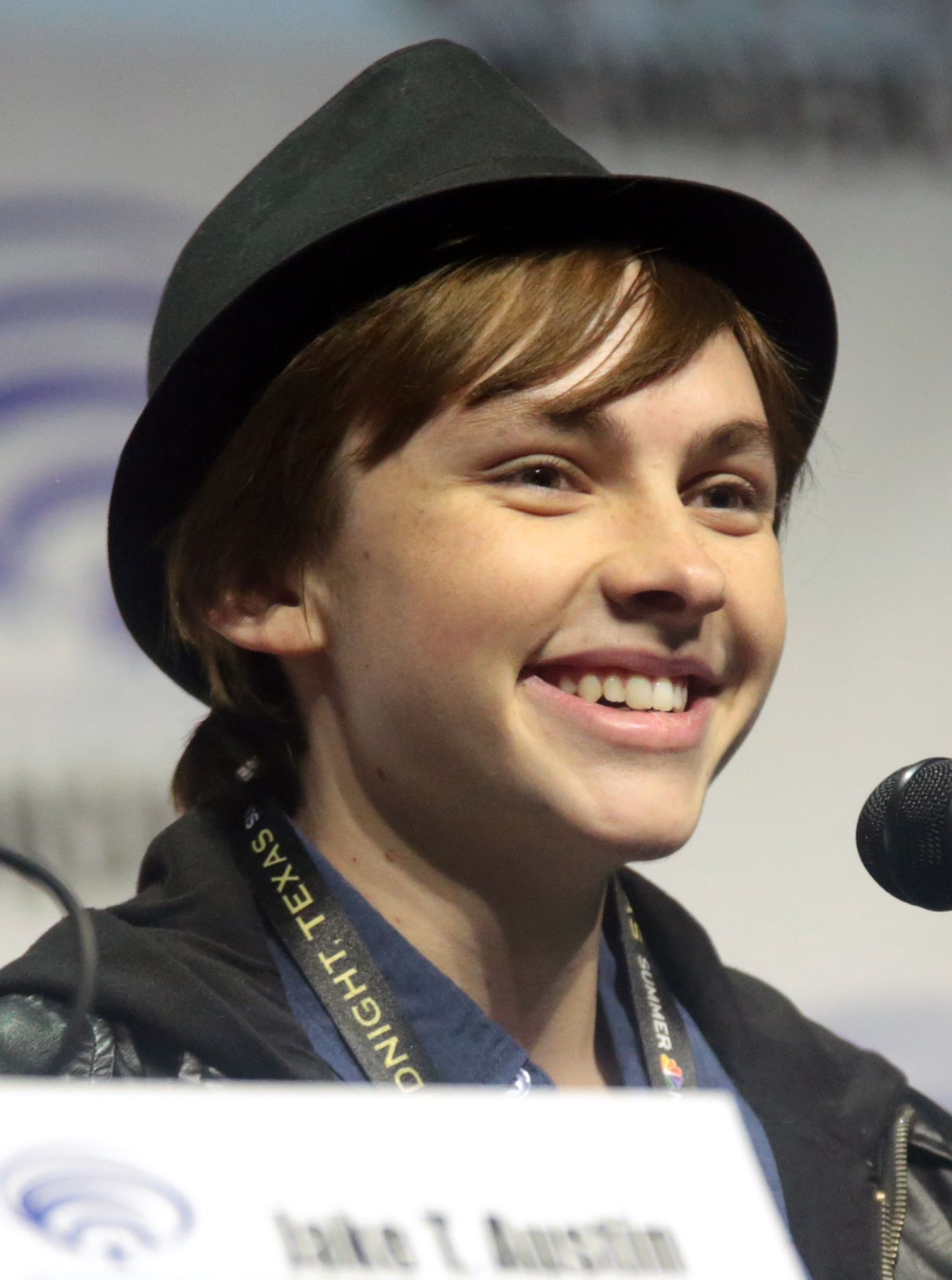
- Allan at WonderCon 2017
- Occupation: Actor
- Years active: 2012–present

Stuart Allan is an American actor. He is known for voicing Damian Wayne in the DC Animated Movie Universe films Son of Batman, Batman vs. Robin, Batman: Bad Blood, Justice League vs. Teen Titans, Teen Titans: The Judas Contract, Batman: Hush, and Justice League Dark: Apokolips War, and Russell Clay in Transformers: Robots in Disguise.

== Filmography ==
=== Television ===
Year	Title	Role	Notes
2012	Guess How Much I Love You	Little Gray Squirrel	Voice, 20 episodes
2012	Gravity Falls	Young Stan Pines	Voice, episode: "Dreamscaperers"
2013	The Haunted Hathaways	Barry Fink	Episode: "Haunted Interview"
2013	Good Luck Charlie	Noah	
2014	Bad Teacher	James Pfaff	8 episodes
2014	Clarence	Buddy	Voice, episode: "Clarence's Millions"
2015–2017	Transformers: Robots in Disguise	Russell Clay	Voice, 71 episodes

=== Films ===
Year	Title	Role	Notes
2012	Rise of the Guardians	British Boy	Voice
2014	Son of Batman	Damian Wayne / Robin	Voice
2015	Batman vs. Robin	Damian Wayne / Robin	Voice
2016	Batman: Bad Blood	Damian Wayne / Robin	Voice
2016	Justice League vs. Teen Titans	Damian Wayne / Robin	Voice
2017	Teen Titans: The Judas Contract	Damian Wayne / Robin	Voice
2019	Batman: Hush	Damian Wayne / Robin	Voice
2020	Justice League Dark: Apokolips War	Damian Wayne / Robin	Voice

=== Anime ===
Year	Title	Role	Notes
2022	Legend of the Galactic Heroes: Die Neue These - Collision	Additional voices	English dub; credited as Stuart Allen
2024	The Elusive Samurai	Fubuki	Voice, English dub

=== Video games ===
Year	Title	Voice role	Notes
2018	Lego DC Super-Villains	Damian Wayne / Robin	
2021	Shin Megami Tensei V	Ichiro Dazai	

== Awards and nominations ==
Allan was nominated for "Best Performance in a Voice-Over Role - Young Actor for" category in the 36th Young Artist Awards.

Year	Category	Award	Result
2014	Best Performance in a Voice-Over Role - Young Actor (Son of Batman)	Young Artist Awards	Won
2015	Best Actor in a Drama for The Diviners	National Youth Arts Awards	Won
2016	Best Young Actor Voice Over Role 13-21 (Batman vs. Robin)	Young Entertainer Awards	Nominated
2016	BTVA Television Voice Acting Award [ensemble] (Transformers: Robots in Disguise)	Behind The Voice Actor Awards	Won
2016	BTVA People's Choice Voice Acting Award [ensemble] (Transformers: Robots in Disguise)	Behind The Voice Actor Awards	Won
