= Sean Maher =

American actor (born 1975)

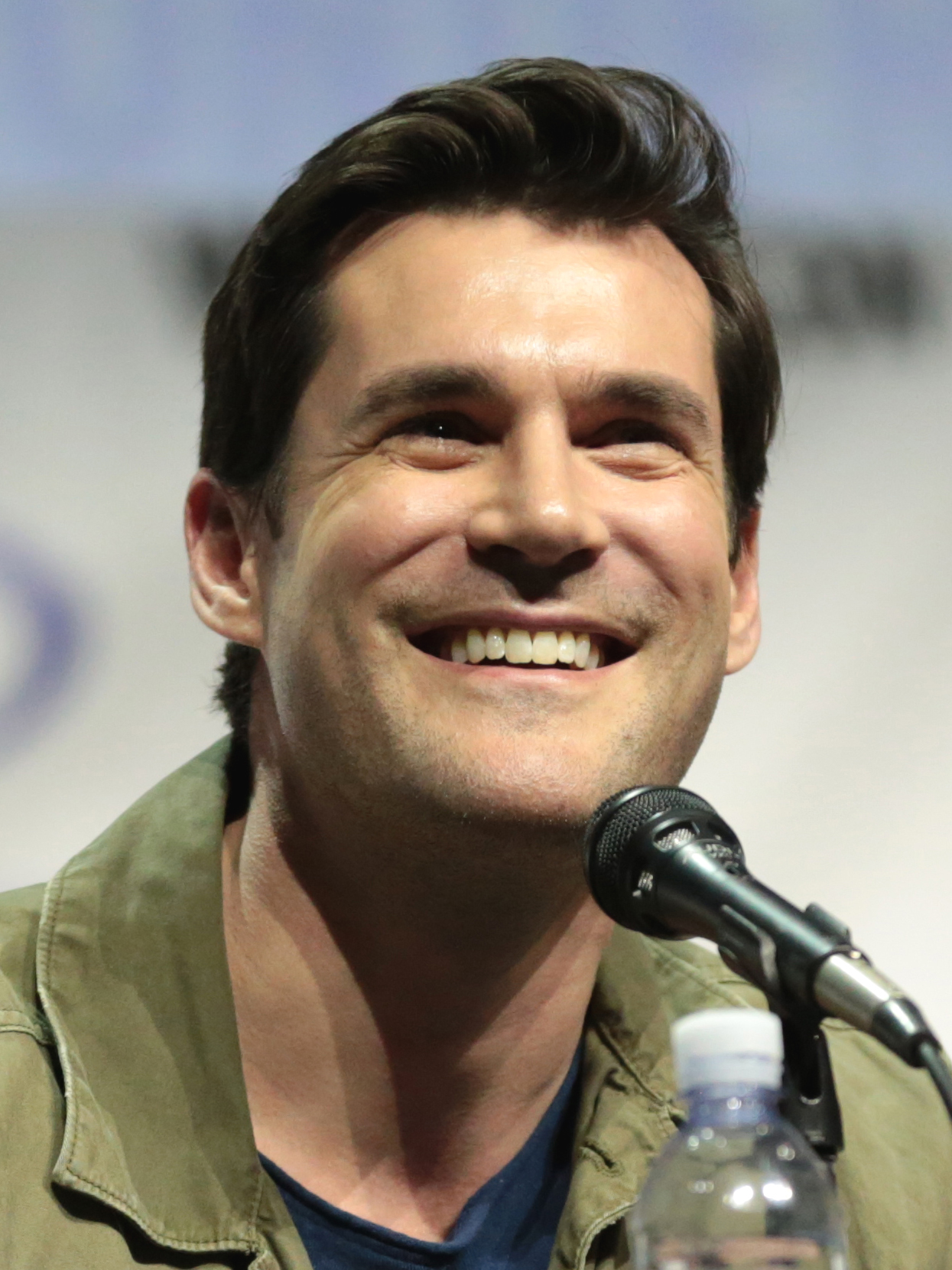
- Maher at the 2017 WonderCon
- Born: April 16, 1975 (age 51); Pleasantville, New York, U.S.
- Education: New York University
- Occupation: Actor
- Years active: 1999–present
- Spouse: Paul Mareski (m. 2016)
- Children: 2

Sean Maher (/mɑːr/ MAR; born April 16, 1975) is an American actor. He is known for his portrayal of Simon Tam in the science fiction television series Firefly and follow-up movie Serenity.

== Early life ==
Maher was born in Pleasantville, New York to Joseph and Margaret Maher. After graduating from Byram Hills High School, Maher trained at New York University where he earned his drama degree in 1997. He acted on stage in several productions, including Yerma and Into the Woods.

== Career ==
Maher starred as the title character, a rookie police officer, on the short-lived TV series Ryan Caulfield: Year One. In 2000 he played one of the main characters on the short-lived (dropped after seven episodes) Fox series The $treet, and he has also appeared on the television series Party of Five (as Adam Matthews) and on CSI: Miami.

He reprised his role from Firefly in the film Serenity (2005). Maher was also cast as a chief resident in a hospital on the new series Halley's Comet. He appeared in the 2005 Lifetime network movie The Dive From Clausen's Pier as Michelle Trachtenberg's new love interest. He also appeared as Brian Piccolo in the 2001 remake of Brian's Song.

In 2006, he appeared in the television movie Wedding Wars. After taking a brief break from acting, Maher came back to TV in 2009 as a guest star in Lifetime Television's pilot episode of Drop Dead Diva, followed by 2010 guest appearances in the second season of The Mentalist (CBS), the first season of Human Target (FOX) and the second season of Warehouse 13 (on Syfy).

In 2011 Maher landed a role in the television series The Playboy Club. He played Sean, a closeted gay man who is in a sham marriage with a closeted lesbian Playboy Bunny. He appeared in eight episodes, in 2011 and 2012, in another series, Make It or Break It, as the character Marcus. He played the villainous Don John in Joss Whedon's 2012 adaptation of Much Ado About Nothing.

In 2014, Maher voiced Dick Grayson/Nightwing in Son of Batman, a direct-to-video animated film. It is part of the DC Universe Animated Original Movies. This was followed by the same role in Justice League vs. Teen Titans and Batman: Bad Blood in 2016 and Teen Titans: The Judas Contract in 2017.

== Personal life ==
Maher publicly came out as gay in 2011, using his role as a closeted gay man on The Playboy Club as a platform. He and his husband Paul have two adopted children: a daughter and a son. Following the birth of their daughter in 2007, Maher took two years off from acting to be a stay-at-home dad.

== Filmography ==
=== Film ===
Year	Title	Role	Notes
2005	Serenity	Dr. Simon Tam	
2005	Living 'til the End	Jack Whilton	
2012	Much Ado About Nothing	Don John	
2012	Best Friends Forever	Sean	
2014	BFFs	J.K.	a.k.a. Heads We Do
2014	Son of Batman	Dick Grayson / Nightwing	Voice
2015	Batman vs. Robin	Dick Grayson / Nightwing	Voice
2015	People You May Know	Joe	
2016	Batman: Bad Blood	Dick Grayson / Nightwing / Batman	Voice
2016	Justice League vs. Teen Titans	Dick Grayson / Nightwing	Voice
2017	Teen Titans: The Judas Contract	Dick Grayson / Nightwing	Voice
2017	Beyond the Edge	Dr. Abe Anderson	formerly known as ISRA-88
2019	Batman: Hush	Dick Grayson / Nightwing	Voice
2019	Teen Titans Go! vs. Teen Titans	Dick Grayson / Nightwing	Voice

=== Television ===
Year	Title	Role	Notes
1999	Ryan Caulfield: Year One	Ryan Caulfield	Title role, (7 episodes)
2000	Party of Five	Adam Matthews	Recurring (7 episodes)
2000–2001	The $treet	Chris McConnell	Regular (12 episodes)
2001	Hostage Rescue Team		TV film
2001	Brian's Song	Brian Piccolo	TV film
2002–2003	Firefly	Dr. Simon Tam	Main (14 episodes)
2003	CSI: Miami	Carson Mackie	Episode: "Spring Break"
2005	Halley's Comet	Bret Fennow	TV film
2005	The Dive from Clausen's Pier	Kilroy	TV film
2005	Ghost Whisperer	Conor Donovan	Episode: "Mended Hearts"
2006	Wedding Wars	Ted Moore	TV film
2009	Drop Dead Diva	Marcus Newsome	Episode: "Pilot"
2010	The Mentalist	Jasper / Wilson	Episode: "Bleeding Heart"
2010	Human Target	Aaron Cooper	Episode: "Embassy Row"
2010	Warehouse 13	Sheldon	Episode: "Mild Mannered"
2011	The Playboy Club	Sean Beasley	Guest role (7 episodes)
2011–2012	Make It or Break It	Marcus	Recurring (8 episodes)
2013–2014	Arrow	Mark Scheffer / Shrapnel	2 episodes: "Blast Radius", "Suicide Squad"
2015	Looking	Jake	Episode: "Looking for Home"
2018	9-1-1	Paul	Episode: "Full Moon (Creepy A.F.)"
2019	The Rookie	Caleb Jost	Episode: "Manhunt"
TBA	Firefly: the Animated Series	Dr. Simon Tam	Voice; Main role

=== Other media ===
Year	Title	Role	Notes
2004	CSI: Miami	Carson	Video game
2013	EastSiders	Paul	Web-series (3 episodes)
2014	New Year	Narrator	Animated exhibition by Adam Shecter
2015	Con Man	Himself	Web-series
