= Justice League Dark: Apokolips War =

2020 American animated superhero film

- Ultra HD Blu-ray cover
- Directed by: Matt Peters; Christina Sotta
- Screenplay by: Ernie Altbacker; Mairghread Scott
- Story by: Mairghread Scott
- Based on: Characters by DC Comics
- Produced by: James Tucker
- Starring: Stuart Allan; Taissa Farmiga; Rosario Dawson; Jerry O'Connell; Jason O'Mara; Matt Ryan; Tony Todd
- Edited by: Christopher D. Lozinski
- Music by: Frederik Wiedmann
- Production companies: Warner Bros. Animation; DC Entertainment
- Distributed by: Warner Home Video
- Release date: May 5, 2020 (digital download)
- Running time: 90 minutes
- Country: United States
- Language: English

Justice League Dark: Apokolips War is a 2020 American adult animated superhero film featuring the DC Comics superhero teams of the same name, produced by Warner Bros. Animation and distributed by Warner Home Video. The film is directed by Matt Peters and Christina Sotta, while Ernie Altbacker and Mairghread Scott wrote the screenplay. It stars Stuart Allan, Taissa Farmiga, Rosario Dawson, Jerry O'Connell, Jason O'Mara, Matt Ryan, and Tony Todd. In the film, the remaining members of the Justice League, Justice League Dark, Teen Titans and the Suicide Squad join forces against Darkseid to save Earth.

Based on the comic book storylines "Darkseid War" by Geoff Johns, "Final Crisis" by Grant Morrison, and elements of "Futures End", it is the 41st overall film of the DC Universe Animated Original Movies as well as the fifteenth and final feature film set in the first half of the DC Animated Movie Universe (DCAMU), generally marking the continuity's conclusion. The film was released digitally on May 5, 2020, and in 4K/Blu-ray/DVD on May 19. It received mostly positive reviews from critics but garnered more mixed responses from audiences.

== Plot ==
The Justice League and the Teen Titans devise a plan to defeat Darkseid, the ruler of the planet Apokolips, (Note: The planet previously appeared in Justice League: War (2014), The Death of Superman (2018), and Reign of the Supermen (2019).) but are secretly being watched by Darkseid through Cyborg who sees their whole plan. After the Justice League arrive on Apokolips, they are soon defeated by Paradooms, hybrid creatures made from Parademons and Doomsday using Superman's Kryptonian DNA. The battle ends with most of the League members and Titans killed, while those who survive are either enslaved by Darkseid or have escaped and are in hiding.

Two years later, Darkseid has placed devices known as "Reapers" which mine the planet's core. Superman is depowered after being tattooed by Darkseid with liquid kryptonite. He is then released so that he can spend the rest of his life knowing that his failed plan cost his teammates lives. The remaining heroes blame Superman for his failed plan. He reunites with Raven, who has been struggling to maintain her father Trigon's imprisonment. (Note: Having imprisoned him in the prison gem adorning her forehead during the events of Justice League vs. Teen Titans (2016).) They seek John Constantine for a location spell to track Damian Wayne to help free his father Batman. Although considering himself a coward for fleeing during the initial attack on Darkseid and leaving his lover Zatanna to die, Constantine locates Damian at a League of Assassins outpost, and he reluctantly agrees to join the group.

They travel to Stryker's Island in Metropolis and meet with Clark's wife Lois Lane who has recruited the Suicide Squad to their cause, now led by Harley Quinn. (Note: As a result of Amanda Waller dying from cancer after the events of Suicide Squad: Hell to Pay (2018).) Clark and Lois' plan is to infiltrate LexCorp and use a Boom Tube to reach Apokolips and kill Darkseid. Meanwhile, the remaining heroes attacking the Reapers are slowly being killed by the Paradooms. Lex Luthor, who was working with Lois to gain intel on Darkseid, is at LexCorp. Lois, Luthor, and the Squad remain on LexCorp to defend the Boom Tube while Clark, Damian, Raven, Constantine, and Etrigan the Demon infiltrate Apokolips. Batman learns of Luthor's betrayal and sends Paradooms and the new Furies after the heroes.

Upon arrival, Clark's group is attacked by the Furies, consisting of cybernetic versions of Wonder Woman, Mera, Hawkman, Starfire, and Martian Manhunter. Wonder Woman kills Etrigan, before Constantine breaks her free using her Lasso of Truth; she decides to stay behind to fend off the other Furies. Superman's group later rescues Flash from a treadmill powering Apokolips. Cyborg, who has been integrated into Apokolips's network confronts them. Constantine frees him from Darkseid's control, which also frees the remaining Furies. Darkseid orders Batman to kill Damian, but he hesitates when being reminded of his parents' death, which breaks him free of Darkseid's control. Furious, Darkseid tries to kill Batman, but Damian intercepts him, dying in Batman's arms. Damian's death overwhelms Raven, the two having confessed their love for one another earlier on Striker's Island, and her emotional instability frees Trigon. Constantine offers his body as a vessel for Trigon, but he refuses and takes Clark's body instead, purging the kryptonite from him, restoring his powers, and kills Constantine by breaking his neck. Now possessing Clark, Trigon attacks Darkseid. Zatanna visits Constantine in the afterlife, revealing that she used a spell to manipulate him into fleeing the battle that killed her as part of a contingency plan prepared by Batman when she died. Raven and Zatanna then revive Damian and Constantine.

At LexCorp, Paradooms overwhelm Lois' team, forcing them to initiate a self-destruct. Lois transmits a goodbye message to Apokolips with Cyborg's assistance. Her death shocks Clark back to his senses and frees him from Trigon's possession. Superman then battles Darkseid. Constantine and Raven combine their magic to give Trigon a physical body so he can continue fighting Darkseid. After sending the rest of the heroes back to Earth, Cyborg sacrifices himself to drag Darkseid, Trigon, and the Paradooms into a void Boom Tube with no destination. Trigon prevents Darkseid's escape as they are dragged into oblivion along with Apokolips.

Despite their victory, Batman reveals that the Reapers have drained 31% of Earth's magma, the planet's rotation was compromised, and billions of people will die before the League can find a solution. As a result, Constantine convinces Flash to run back in time and reset the timeline again. (Note: Flash previously did this in Justice League: The Flashpoint Paradox (2013).) Despite knowing that the world will never be perfect or the same as before, it still has to be better than theirs. Flash agrees and makes another flashpoint, resetting the timeline. (Note: Leading indirectly to the events of Justice League: Crisis on Infinite Earths (2024).)

== Voice cast ==
Voice actor	Character
Matt Ryan	John Constantine
Jerry O'Connell	Clark Kent / Superman
Taissa Farmiga	Raven
Stuart Allan	Damian Wayne / Robin
Tony Todd	Uxas / Darkseid
Ray Chase	Etrigan
Jason O'Mara	Bruce Wayne / Batman
Rosario Dawson	Diana Prince / Wonder Woman
Rainn Wilson	Lex Luthor
Rebecca Romijn	Lois Lane
Camilla Luddington	Zatanna
Christopher Gorham	Barry Allen / Flash
Shemar Moore	Victor Stone / Cyborg
Hynden Walch	Harley Quinn
Liam McIntyre	Digger Harkness / Captain Boomerang
John DiMaggio	King Shark, Trigon
Sachie Alessio	Lady Shiva
Roger Cross	John Stewart / Green Lantern, Alec Holland / Swamp Thing

== Production ==
Justice League Dark: Apokolips War was first announced in July 2019 at San Diego Comic-Con. Several voice actors from previous DC Animated Movie Universe films reprised their respective roles.

== Release ==
Justice League Dark: Apokolips War was released on digital platforms on May 5, 2020, and on 4K/Blu-ray/DVD on May 19. It features a showcase animated short based on Adam Strange.

== Reception ==
=== Critical response ===
On review aggregator Rotten Tomatoes, the film has an approval rating of 100% based on 18 reviews, with an average rating of 7.5/10. Jesse Schedeen of IGN said: "This film takes full advantage of the fact that it's the final chapter in a 15-movie arc. Its narrative veers into some very surprising and compelling directions, and somehow it manages to pay off on loose ends from across the DCU".

=== Revenue ===
Justice League Dark: Apokolips War earned $5,661,974 from domestic Blu-ray sales.

== Future ==
In spite of Justice League Dark: Apokolips War being confirmed as the last film in the DCAMU, screenwriter Ernie Altbacker teased the possibility of a new project related to that continuity. He said that "the way we ended it ... it's really like a tough balancing act: It ends something on a bittersweet yet hopeful note, and I'll just say, people who are saying, 'Oh man, we're not going to get anymore of these!' ... you're not losing something, you're gaining something new ..."

The DCAMU's second phase occasionally references events from the first phase. In May 2022, Constantine: The House of Mystery was released. The short film deals with the aftermath of Apokolips War, setting the plot of the Justice League: Crisis on Infinite Earths film trilogy.
