= Frederik Wiedmann =

German composer (born 1981)

- Born: 1981 (age 44–45); Stuttgart, West Germany (now Germany)
- Genre: Film score
- Occupation: Composer
- Website: frederikwiedmann.com

Frederik Wiedmann (born 1981) is a German composer.

He composed the scores for the 2014 films Sniper: Legacy as well as Field of Lost Shoes. Wiedmann also composed the score for the 2007 film Return to House on Haunted Hill (building on Don Davis' score from the first film for some scenes). As of 2012, he is responsible for composing the score to the television series Green Lantern: The Animated Series and Beware the Batman. Most recently, he composed the score for Tremors 5: Bloodline and Shut In.

== Filmography ==
=== Feature films ===
| Year | Title | Director | Notes |
|---|---|---|---|
| 2007 | Beneath | Dagen Merrill | Direct-to-DVD film |
| 2009 | The Hills Run Red | Dave Parker | |
| 2010 | Cyrus: Mind of a Serial Killer | Mark Vadik | |
| 2011 | Midway to Heaven | Michael Flynn | |
| 2011 | Bad Actress | Robert Lee King | |
| 2011 | Hellraiser: Revelations | Víctor Garcia | |
| 2011 | A Holiday Heist | Christie Will | |
| 2011 | 1 Out of 7 | York Shackleton | Composed with Joshua J. Hyde |
| 2011 | Hostel: Part III | Scott Spiegel | |
| 2012 | Black Box | Matthew Schilling | |
| 2012 | True Bloodthirst | Todor Chapkanov | |
| 2013 | The Advocate | Tamas Harangi | |
| 2013 | The Damned | Víctor Garcia | |
| 2014 | Of Silence | Jeremiah Sayys | |
| 2014 | Sniper Legacy | | |
| 2014 | Pretty Perfect | York Shackleton | |
| 2014 | Dying of the Light | Paul Schrader | |
| 2014 | Field of Lost Shoes | Sean McNamara | |
| 2015 | Intruders | Adam Schindle | |
| 2016 | Sniper Ghost Shooter | | |
| 2017 | It Watches | Dave Parker | |
| 2017 | Vengeance: A Love Story | Johnny Martin | |
| 2017 | Acts of Vengeance | Isaac Florentine | |
| 2017 | Hangman | Johnny Martin | |
| 2018 | 211 | York Shackleton | |
| 2018 | Scorpion King: Book of Souls | Don Michael Paul | |
| 2018 | Red Island | Lux | |
| 2018 | Burning Bright | Aaron Bierman | |
| 2019 | Doom: Annihilation | Tony Giglio | |
| 2019 | Itsy Bitsy | Micah Gallo | |
| 2020 | Alone | Johnny Martin | |
| 2020 | Tremors: Shrieker Island | Don Michael Paul | |
| 2024 | Monster Summer | David Henrie | |
| 2025 | Off the Grid | Johnny Martin | |
| 2025 | Primitive War | Luke Sparke | |
| 2026 | Clash of the Thundermans | Trevor Kirschner | |

=== Animated films ===
| Year | Title | Director | Notes |
|---|---|---|---|
| 2013 | Justice League: The Flashpoint Paradox | Jay Oliva | Direct-to-video film |
| 2014 | JLA Adventures: Trapped in Time | Giancarlo Volpe | Direct-to-video film |
| 2014 | Son of Batman | Ethan Spaulding | Direct-to-video film |
| 2015 | Justice League: Throne of Atlantis | Ethan Spaulding | Direct-to-video film |
| 2015 | Batman vs. Robin | Jay Oliva | Direct-to-video film |
| 2015 | Justice League: Gods and Monsters | Sam Liu | Direct-to-video film |
| 2016 | Batman: Bad Blood | Jay Oliva | Direct-to-video film |
| 2016 | Justice League vs. Teen Titans | Sam Liu | Direct-to-video film |
| 2017 | Teen Titans: The Judas Contract | Sam Liu | Direct-to-video film |
| 2018 | Batman: Gotham by Gaslight | Sam Liu | Direct-to-video film |
| 2018 | The Death of Superman | Sam Liu | Direct-to-video film |
| 2019 | Wonder Woman: Bloodlines | Sam Liu; Justin Copeland | Direct-to-video film |
| 2019 | Reign of the Supermen | Sam Liu | Direct-to-video film |
| 2020 | Superman: Red Son | Sam Liu | Direct-to-video film |
| 2020 | Justice League Dark: Apokolips War | Matt Peters; Christina Sotta | Direct-to-video film |

=== Television ===
| Year | Title |
|---|---|
| 2011–2013 | Green Lantern: The Animated Series |
| 2013–2014 | Beware the Batman |
| 2014–2017 | All Hail King Julien |
| 2014–2022 | Alarm for Cobra 11 – The Highway Police |
| 2015–2018 | Miles from Tomorrowland |
| 2018–2024 | The Dragon Prince |
| 2020–2022 | Madagascar: A Little Wild |
| 2022–2024 | Big Nate |
| 2022–2023 | Eureka! |
| 2022–2025 | Firebuds |
| 2023 | Star Trek: Picard |
| 2024–present | Batman: Caped Crusader |
