= Batman vs. Robin =

2015 animated superhero film directed by Jay Oliva

- DVD cover
- Directed by: Jay Oliva
- Screenplay by: J. M. DeMatteis
- Based on: "Batman: The Court of Owls" by Scott Snyder; Greg Capullo; Jonathan Glapion
- Produced by: James Tucker
- Starring: Stuart Allan; Jason O'Mara; Jeremy Sisto; Grey Griffin
- Edited by: Al Bretienbach
- Music by: Frederik Wiedmann
- Production companies: Warner Bros. Animation; DC Entertainment; The Answer Studio (animation services)
- Distributed by: Warner Home Video
- Release dates: April 7, 2015 (digital); April 14, 2015 (physical)
- Running time: 80 minutes
- Country: United States
- Language: English

Batman vs. Robin is a 2015 American animated superhero film which is the 23rd film of the DC Universe Animated Original Movies and the fifth film in the DC Animated Movie Universe. The film is partially based on the "Batman: The Court of Owls" saga written by Scott Snyder and illustrated by Greg Capullo and Jonathan Glapion, combined with aspects of Batman & Robin: Born to Kill by Peter Tomasi and Patrick Gleason and Detective Comics: Faces of Death arcs by Tony S. Daniel, and serves as a sequel to 2014's Son of Batman. The film was shown during WonderCon on April 3, 2015, and was released on Blu-ray and DVD formats on April 14.

Stuart Allan, Jason O'Mara, David McCallum, and Sean Maher reprise their respective roles from Son of Batman. It was McCallum's last film role before his death in 2023. He would be replaced by James Garrett in future DCAMU films.

== Plot ==
In the past, a young Bruce Wayne learns of a secret, shadowy organization called the Court of Owls from his father Thomas. After witnessing the death of his parents, Bruce suspects that the Court was behind the murder but finds no evidence, which leads him to believe the Court was in fact just a story. In the present day, Bruce's son Damian (Note: Introduced in the 2014 film Son of Batman.) goes out as Robin to rescue missing children abducted by Anton Schott AKA Dollmaker, who has been brainwashing them into his "dolls". While Batman frees the children, an angry Damian confronts Anton on his own. A mysterious figure in an owl costume appears and advises him to kill Anton, tearing Anton's heart out when Damian refuses and leaving a feather behind. Batman comes across Anton's corpse and suspects Damian of killing him, due to his past violent actions and the fact that the mysterious figure was only seen by him. Bruce thinks Damian is dangerous, prompting him to place security measures around Wayne Manor to prevent him from going out as Robin without his permission.

The following night, Bruce goes out as Batman to track down the source of the feather, leading him to a museum where he finds it came from a large preserved owl. Bruce is ambushed by a group of owl costumed assassins, wounding him, but is rescued by Dick Grayson. While driving to meet with his girlfriend Samantha Vanaver, a group of thugs in owl masks run him off the road and take him to their headquarters, where he meets their leader the "Grandmaster", who offers Bruce the chance to join them. He kindly declines, leaving a tracking device in their hideout before leaving. Unaware he is Batman, the court lets him leave safely. Meanwhile, Damian escapes Wayne Manor, and while out he meets the same assassin who killed Anton. Introducing himself as Talon, he takes Damian under his wing, training him to become a Court assassin. Damian grows closer to Talon, eventually leading to a physical fight between Bruce and Damian.

Bruce infiltrates the Court headquarters and is dosed by hallucinogenic gas, causing him to see a future where Damian becomes a murderous vigilante, but is again rescued by Nightwing and Alfred Pennyworth. When Damian is revealed to be Bruce's son, the Grandmaster rejects him under the decision to emotionally cripple Bruce with Damian's death, prompting Talon to attack the Court, killing several members in the process, before killing the Grandmaster, who is revealed to be Samantha. Now having control of the Court, Talon gathers an army of immortal Owls and leads an attack on Wayne Manor, but Batman, Nightwing and Alfred fend them off by freezing them.

Talon then confronts Bruce in a duel and severely wounds him. Damian escapes the Court headquarters and defends Bruce from Talon, telling him he could never be a better father than Bruce. In his defeat, Talon takes his own life by forcing Damian to stab him through the neck with his own sai. This greatly traumatizes Damian, who rejects Bruce's offer to return home, claiming that he doesn't know who he is. Bruce consoles Damian and allows him to leave, suggesting he go to a monastery in the Himalayas he once visited to find himself, which Damian accepts. (Note: Damian returns in the 2016 film Batman: Bad Blood.)

== Cast ==
- Stuart Allan – Damian Wayne / Robin
- Jason O'Mara – Bruce Wayne / Batman
- Jeremy Sisto – Talon
- Sean Maher – Dick Grayson / Nightwing
- David McCallum – Alfred Pennyworth
- Troy Baker – Court of Owls Lieutenant
- Kevin Conroy – Thomas Wayne
- Grey DeLisle – Samantha Vanaver
- Robin Atkin Downes – Court of Owls Grandmaster
- "Weird Al" Yankovic – Anton Schott / The Dollmaker
- Trevor Devall – Jack
- Griffin Gluck – Young Bruce Wayne
- Peter Onorati – Draco
- Andrea Romano – Jill

== Reception ==
The review aggregator Rotten Tomatoes reported an approval rating of 100%, with an average score of 8.4/10, based on 5 reviews. IGN rated it 6.7/10 and Screen Rant rated it 2.5/5. The film earned $4,275,434 from domestic home video sales.

== Sequels ==
A sequel titled Batman: Bad Blood was released in 2016 which was followed by Batman: Hush in 2019.
