= Batman: Hush (film) =

2019 animated film directed by Justin Copeland

- Ultra HD Blu-ray cover
- Directed by: Justin Copeland
- Screenplay by: Ernie Altbacker
- Based on: Batman: Hush by: Jeph Loeb; Jim Lee
- Produced by: Amy McKenna
- Starring: Jason O'Mara; Jennifer Morrison
- Edited by: Christopher D. Lozinski
- Music by: Frederik Wiedmann
- Production companies: Warner Bros. Animation; DC Entertainment
- Distributed by: Warner Bros. Home Entertainment
- Release dates: July 19, 2019 (San Diego Comic-Con); July 20, 2019
- Running time: 82 minutes
- Country: United States
- Language: English

Batman: Hush is a 2019 American animated superhero film featuring the DC Comics superhero Batman and loosely based on the 2002 comic book story arc of the same name. It is the thirteenth installment of the DC Animated Movie Universe and the 38th overall film of the DC Universe Animated Original Movies line. In the film, Batman forms an alliance with Catwoman to defeat a new villain named Hush, who knows all of Batman's secrets and targets key figures in his life.

This is the final posthumous release for longtime DC producer Benjamin Melniker, who died almost a year and a half before its release.

== Plot ==
After Batman rescues an abducted child from Bane for a ransom, Lady Shiva informs him of an unknown Lazarus Pit intruder and requests his help in identifying them. Batman agrees to do so as Catwoman steals the ransom. While pursuing her, a masked man shoots through Batman's grapple line, causing him to fall onto the sidewalk and crack his skull. Catwoman rescues him from a gang of criminals who tried to unmask him, but Batgirl chases her away. Batgirl takes Batman back to the Batcave where Alfred and Dick Grayson create an alibi for how Bruce Wayne suffered the injury. Alfred contacts Bruce's childhood friend Thomas Elliot, a renowned brain surgeon, to treat him. When Bruce declares himself ready to be Batman again two weeks earlier than Thomas advised him to, Alfred gives him a new bulletproof batsuit with a padded cowl for better skull protection. Meanwhile, Catwoman delivers the ransom to Poison Ivy, who has been controlling her through hypnotism. The masked man who shot Batman then arrives to confront Ivy about the ransom and gives her Kryptonite.

Batman helps Amanda Waller retrieve Bane from police custody in return for information. Waller uses the special tranquilizers supplied by him to stop Bane from escaping police custody and capture him herself. Batman later reluctantly works with Catwoman to find Ivy, following a lead given by her to Metropolis. There, Batman confronts probationary Justice League member Lex Luthor, (Note: After helping them defeat Cyborg Superman as depicted in Reign of the Supermen.) about the delivery list of an ethylene compound utilized by Ivy. Ivy kisses Superman with Kryptonite lipstick to control him and orders him to kill both Catwoman and Batman. Catwoman pushes Lois Lane off a building to stop Superman and free him from mind control. After Ivy is defeated, she reveals she was acting on the orders of a criminal known only as "Hush".

Hush later kidnaps the Joker to persuade Harley Quinn into attacking an opera attended by Bruce Wayne, Selina Kyle, and Thomas Elliot. During the commotion, Hush lures Thomas outside and kills him, framing the Joker for the murder, much to Batman's anger. The Joker attempts to claim his innocence before Batman brutally beats him and nearly kills him. Following the Joker's arrest and Thomas' funeral, Bruce deduces that Hush knows he is Batman. While on patrol, Hush catches Batman's attention and confronts him, although Hush tricks him by using mirrors. He then threatens to hurt everyone close to him, prompting Batman to reveal his identity to Catwoman. Bruce takes Selina to the Batcave, where she meets Dick and Alfred and learns of Bruce's son Damian. The two become a crime-fighting couple, facing villains like The Penguin, Two-Face, and Mr. Freeze. Hush later lures Dick and Selina to Thomas’ grave, where they are attacked by Scarecrow. Dick is incapacitated by Scarecrow's fear toxin while Hush kidnaps Selina.

Shortly after, Commissioner Gordon informs Bruce of a break-in at Thomas’ office. While investigating, Batman learns that one of Thomas' patients was someone using the alias of crossword puzzle inventor Arthur Wynne, leading him to suspect Edward Nygma aka the Riddler was behind the break-in. At Arkham Asylum, Batman interrogates the Riddler, who reveals that he had deduced his secret identity while using the Lazarus Pit to cure his untreatable brain tumor, and took on the identity of Hush due to his lack of respect among other villains. Batman soon deduces that this "Riddler" is actually Clayface in disguise and, after defeating him, learns where the real Riddler has taken Selina: a factory whose name is an anagram of Arthur Wynne.

At the factory, Batman rescues Selina and defeats the Riddler, who is growing weaker as the Lazarus Pit's effects wear off. With the building about to explode, Batman risks his own life to try to save the Riddler from falling into a vat of molten metal. Realizing this, Selina cuts the grapple line holding the Riddler and lets him fall to his death to allow Batman to escape. Once they reach safety, Batman and Selina argue over the latter's actions and decide to call off their relationship due to Selina being unable to cope with Bruce's moral code.

== Voice cast ==
Voice actor	Character
Jason O'Mara	Batman / Bruce Wayne
Jennifer Morrison	Selina Kyle / Catwoman
Stuart Allan	Robin / Damian Wayne
Sachie Alessio	Lady Shiva
Geoffrey Arend	Riddler / Edward Nygma / Hush
Chris Cox	Scarecrow / Dr. Jonathan Crane
James Garrett	Alfred Pennyworth
Adam Gifford	Bane, Clayface / Basil Karlo (uncredited)
Peyton List	Poison Ivy / Pamela Isley
Peyton R. List	Batgirl / Barbara Gordon
Sean Maher	Nightwing / Dick Grayson
Jerry O'Connell	Superman / Kal-El / Clark Kent
Rebecca Romijn	Lois Lane
Jason Spisak	The Joker
Maury Sterling	Thomas Elliot
Tara Strong	Reporter
Bruce Thomas	Commissioner Jim Gordon
Hynden Walch	Harley Quinn / Harleen Quinzel
Vanessa Williams	Amanda Waller
Rainn Wilson	Lex Luthor

Penguin, Two-Face, and Mr. Freeze make non-speaking cameo appearances in a montage of Batman and Catwoman fighting crime together.

== Production ==
Batman: The Animated Series alumni Kevin Conroy (Batman) and Mark Hamill (the Joker) teased an animated adaptation of Batman: Hush during a panel at Canada's Fan Expo in 2016. In 2018, an animated adaptation of Hush was announced.

Jason O'Mara, Jerry O'Connell, Rebecca Romijn, Rainn Wilson, Sean Maher, Bruce Thomas, Vanessa Williams, and Stuart Allan reprise their roles from previous DCAMU films, while the new additions include Jennifer Morrison, Peyton R. List, Maury Sterling, Geoffrey Arend, Jason Spisak, Adam Gifford, Peyton List, and Sachie Alessio. Peyton List reprises her role as Poison Ivy, after previously appearing in the role in Gotham.

== Release ==
Batman: Hush had its world premiere at San Diego Comic-Con on July 19, 2019. The film was made available through digital streaming outlets one day later. It was released on 4K UHD Blu-ray, Blu-ray, and DVD on August 6.

== Reception ==
On Rotten Tomatoes, it has an approval rating of 83% based on reviews from 18 critics with an average rating of 7/10.

The film earned $3,581,562 from domestic Blu-ray sales.
