= Damian Wayne =

Fictional character

- Damian Wayne taken from the variant cover of Nightwing vol. 4 #16 (May 2017). Art by Ivan Reis, Oclair Albert, and Sula Moon.

Publication information
- Publisher: DC Comics
- First appearance: As a baby: Batman: Son of the Demon (1987); As Ibn al Xu'ffasch; Kingdom Come #2 (June, 1996); As Damian Wayne; Batman #655 (September 2006)
- Created by: Grant Morrison (writer); Andy Kubert (artist)

In-story information
- Full name: Damian al Ghul, Damian Wayne
- Species: Human
- Team affiliations: Batman Family; League of Assassins; Teen Titans; Justice League
- Partnerships: Batman; Dick Grayson; Jason Todd; Superboy; Flatline
- Notable aliases: Robin; Batman; Redbird
- Abilities: Genius-level intelligence with knowledge that makes him a skilled detective and crimefighter, a trained computer specialist, knowledgeable in the supernatural, and a capable strategist and tactician.; Expert martial artist and hand-to-hand combat, trained swordsman and in other weaponry, and has proficiency in stealth.; Proficient in using high-tech equipment and weapons (similar to Batman).

Damian Wayne (né al Ghul) is a superhero appearing in American comic books published by DC Comics, commonly in association with Batman. He was created by Grant Morrison and Andy Kubert. Damian Wayne is the biological son of Bruce Wayne/Batman. His mother is Batman's love interest Talia al Ghul, daughter of Batman's adversary Ra's al Ghul, who wants Bruce Wayne to sire his future lineage. Bruce and Talia were engaged, but she calls off their marriage once she becomes pregnant and tells Bruce she miscarried, keeping Damian's existence hidden for years. Damian was intended to serve as a host body for Ra's al Ghul, which would unify the Wayne and al Ghul factions. Damian is Bruce's youngest child and only biological one, with Dick Grayson, Jason Todd, Tim Drake, and Cassandra Cain as his adopted siblings.

A prototype of the character originally appeared as an unnamed infant in the 1987 story Batman: Son of the Demon, which at the time was not considered canon. Following this, various alternate universe stories dealt with the character's life, giving him various names. In 2006, the character was reinterpreted as Damian Wayne by Grant Morrison and introduced into the main continuity in Batman #655, the first issue of the "Batman and Son" story arc after a temporal paradox to the timeline including of Batman's history following the events of Infinite Crisis. Damian Wayne is the fifth character to assume the role of Robin, Batman's vigilante partner.

Damian, as a preadolescent, was left by his mother in the care of his father, who had been unaware of his existence. He is violent, self-important, and was trained by the League of Assassins, learning to kill at a young age, which troubles his relationship with his father, who vowed never to take a life. However, the Dark Knight does care for his lost progeny. After the events of Batman R.I.P. and Batman: Battle for the Cowl, he takes the role of Robin at ten years of age, becoming the fifth person to use the Robin persona. He first works with Dick Grayson before going to work alongside his father, upon his father's return to the role of Batman.

Damian appears in the 2023 Christmas-themed animated film, Merry Little Batman, voiced by Yonas Kibreab; and returned in the TV series, Bat-Fam, with Kibreab reprising his role. He is also slated to make his live-action debut in the film The Brave and the Bold, produced by DC Studios.

== Publication history ==
The child from Son of the Demon was used as a backup character in various stories before appearing as Damian Wayne.

In the Elseworlds story, The Brotherhood of the Bat (1995), a version named Tallant Wayne appears, who crusades against his grandfather Ra's al Ghul. Brotherhood of the Bat features a future in which Ra's al Ghul discovers the Batcave following Bruce Wayne's death, and outfits the League of Assassins in variant Batman costumes based on Wayne's rejected designs. Talia and Bruce's son joins the Brotherhood in his father's costume, to destroy it from within.

In another Elseworlds story, Kingdom Come (1996) by Mark Waid and Alex Ross, which functioned as a possible future to the canon of the time, this child of Batman and Talia is named Ibn al Xu'ffasch (Arabic: ابن الخفّاش), literally "Son of the Bat", and is a member of Lex Luthor's inner circle. He works as a double agent for Batman in Luthor's organization, and thus aligned with his father instead of his maternal grandfather. In the Elliot S! Maggin novelization of Kingdom Come, al Xu'ffasch tells Bruce that his mother Talia is still alive and working as a Mother Superior in Cairo, one of Mother Teresa's successors. al Xu'ffasch reappears in Waid's 1999 sequel The Kingdom.

The Kingdom: Son of the Bat shows flashbacks that shed new insights into Ibn al Xu'ffasch's history: that he was reared by Ra's al Ghul to be the heir to his empire, that he eventually murdered his grandfather (cutting off his head to prevent yet another regeneration), and that he sought therapy from psychiatrist Dr. Gibson. He was eventually recruited by Rip Hunter to try to stop a madman named Gog from altering his history. He works with several other heroes of his generation – Kid Flash, the daughter of the Flash (Wally West); Nightstar; and Offspring, the son of Plastic Man.

In League of Batmen (2001), the sequel to Brotherhood of the Bat, Tallant leads his own team of variant Batmen to combat the plague that was al Ghul's legacy. During the battle, Tallant discovers that his grandfather is the one who murdered his father and then cloned him. Ra's even sent the clone to murder his own daughter. Because of the deaths of his parents at Ra's's hands, Tallant has completed following his father's tragic path as Batman. The new Dark Knight desires justice for his parents along with trying to stop his grandfather while having to battle his father's murderous double.

Grant Morrison's story titled Batman and Son (2006) expands upon the Son of the Demon storyline as part of a remodeling of Batman's personality after the events of Infinite Crisis. In Morrison's version, the child Damian Wayne is the result of a tryst between Batman and Talia, during which the Dark Knight claims he was drugged when they were at the Tropic of Cancer, though Morrison later admitted the claim of drugging was a canonical error on their part. Since then however in issues of the Morrison penned Batman Incorporated, the drugging is reaffirmed and is once again part of Damian's origin. However, Batman and Talia's tryst was later shown as consensual in Peter J. Tomasi's Batman and Robin, thus the circumstances of Damian's conception can vary depending on the writers.

The final issue of 52 (2008) designates the Kingdom Come alternate universe as Earth-22, thus making the Ibn al Xu'ffasch version of Bruce and Talia's son part of the DC Multiverse. Justice Society of America vol. 3 #22 (2009) reveals that he would eventually marry Nightstar with whom he would have a daughter and son, and his family has inherited the Wayne Estates after Batman's death.

== Fictional character biography ==
=== Batman and Son ===
Damian Wayne in Batman #658 (December 2006). Art by Andy Kubert.

Damian is introduced to Bruce Wayne by his mother, where he is left in Bruce's custody. After he is brought to the Wayne Manor, Damian escapes, donning a variant Robin costume, and kills the villain Spook. This troubles his relationship with Batman, who vows never to kill.

=== The Resurrection of Ra's al Ghul ===
Beginning in Batman Annual #26 ("Head of the Demon"), Talia takes Damian to the Australian Outback, where he is tutored in the secret history of his grandfather Ra's al Ghul. They find out that White Ghost, a former servant of Ra's, plans to use him to resurrect Ra's, which would kill him in the process.

Damian goes to Wayne Manor to alert Batman, but instead finds Tim Drake, who does not believe him and engages Damian in a fight. Then the League of Assassins shows up and the two of them get captured. Ra's offers Batman a choice for the body he will take, but Batman rejects either option and instead offers a third alternative: the "Fountain of Essence" which contains the qualities of a Lazarus Pit. Batman and Ra's go in search of the fountain, leaving Tim, Damian, Nightwing, Alfred, and Talia to battle the Sensei. Damian leaves his mother and Tim to an unknown fate, while he goes off to be with his father. He ends up captured by Ra's and is nearly killed. Batman and the others manage to save him, and Talia takes her son and escapes.

A subsequent conversation between Tim and Alfred implies that Batman has carried out a DNA test on Damian. Alfred says Bruce intended to tell him the results when the time was right. At this, Tim realizes that Damian is indeed Bruce's son, and exclaims "The son of Satan is my brother?"

=== Batman R.I.P. ===
Prior to the start of Grant Morrison's "Batman R.I.P." story arc in Batman #675, Damian senses that someone is out to get Batman. In response to this, Talia begins formulating a plan involving Commissioner James Gordon, whom Talia and Damian rescue from a booby-trapped Wayne Manor while in search of Batman, who is insane and has gone missing.

Damian and Alfred race to aid Batman against the Black Glove in a commandeered Batmobile. Damian, who is driving, knocks an ambulance off a bridge without any sign of remorse or even concern. When Alfred reprimands him, Damian retorts with a backhanded threat. The only occupant of the ambulance was the Joker.

=== Battle for the Cowl ===
At the start of Batman: Battle for the Cowl, Damian is now residing in Gotham City, and living under the command of Nightwing. Where before Damian portrayed an arrogant and vicious personality, it appears the "death" of his father has regressed him to a more childlike mindset, as demonstrated when he takes the Batmobile joy-riding with an older girl. This is discovered by Oracle, who ejects the girl and takes control of the Batmobile, intent on taking Damian home. The car is blindsided by Killer Croc and Poison Ivy, who prepares to kill Damian. The older girl is later eaten by Killer Croc. Damian is saved by Nightwing who ends up being cornered by Black Mask's men until a murderous figure appears stating that he is Batman (later revealed to be Jason Todd). Although shot by Todd, Damian recovers and saves Tim Drake from falling to death inside Jason's Batcave. When Grayson hangs up his Nightwing mantle to become the newest Batman, he chooses Damian to assume the mantle of Robin by his side.

=== Batman: Reborn ===
Despite becoming Robin to Grayson's Batman, Damian reveals that he cares little for his older brother and has no respect for him as Batman and that the latter would have to earn it. In an act of defiance, Damian decides to make the Robin mantle independent from that of Batman and decides to stop Dr. Phosphorus from breaking into Project Cadmus, but fails miserably and is saved by Dick. Dick then begins to train Damian as to how to properly become the new Robin and the two develop their own unique crime-fighting style.

Damian and Dick then attack Firefly, who is attempting to kill Black Mask. Victor Zsasz defeats Robin and rescues Black Mask while Dick takes down Firefly. These events cause Hush to escape, causing Damian to grow a further hatred for the criminal. Damian is present when Dick is inducted into the JLA; upon hearing this, Damian demands to be inducted along with Dick but his demands are promptly ignored. Damian is once again saved by Dick, with the assistance of Azrael, after a man named Amon tries to sacrifice him. Sasha, now dubbed Scarlet by Todd, returns and attacks Robin, as Jason attacks Dick. The two duos battle it out until the arrival of the Flamingo, who shoots Damian in the back. Talia replaces Damian's spine, but puts in a monitor connected to his brain allowing her to control his every movement.

=== Red Robin ===
In a flashback, Damian mocks Tim Drake (now Red Robin) after Dick has taken the role of Robin from Tim and given it to Damian. This prompts Tim to attack Damian, only to be stopped by Dick. After Tim leaves, Damian starts engaging in chess games with Hush (Thomas Elliot), visiting him secretly against Dick's orders. When Elliot asked why Damian is visiting him behind the Bat-family's back, Damian shrugs it off as a desire to keep Elliot company. Elliot surmises that Damian is rather using the resemblance to Bruce to "spend time with [his] old man".

Later, Tim—who has been keeping a hit list of criminals and tasks—attracts Damian's fury when the latter hacks the hit list and discovers a hidden layer of allies to the Bat-family considered potential threats by Tim, including Damian. During a stakeout mission, Damian severs Tim's line, causing him to fall from a great height. He survives, and Tim pulls Damian into an all-out brawl that begins with their quarry escaping and ends in front of the theater where Bruce Wayne's parents were killed. The two are stopped by Dick Grayson as Batman, who chastises them both for fighting in front of the theater where Batman was born. The two then enter into a grudging truce for the remainder of Damian's appearances in the series. Dick suggests changing the hit list password to Cousin Oliver, as Damian has little to no interest in pop culture references and would never guess it. Dick notes that his name is not on the list and Tim asserts it is because Dick is the only one who Tim trusts implicitly.

=== Blackest Night ===
After Bruce's skull was taken from his grave, Damian and Dick decide to bring the rest of his skeleton, along with those of Damian's paternal grandparents, to their base beneath Wayne Tower. Damian is quite shaken by the sight of the bones of his family. On the way to the cave, Dick's body is possessed by Deadman, at whom Damian lashes out in confusion. Deadman then possesses and leaves Damian's body, subsequently passing his knowledge of the attack of the Black Lanterns onto him. The two heroes then prepare for the Black Lanterns' assault on Gotham. After raiding the Army Reserve National Guard Armory, Dick, Damian, and the arriving Tim Drake, are able to save Commissioner Gordon, Oracle, and the surviving police officers at Gotham Central from the reanimated versions of the original Dark Knight's deceased rogues gallery members. However, they then find themselves in a horrific encounter with the parents of Dick Grayson and Tim Drake reanimated as Black Lanterns. Dick and Tim send Damian with the Gordons to their underground base while they battle the Black Lanterns. Dick eventually orders Damian through their comm-links to send one of his Wingers with Mr. Freeze's gun. Grayson uses the weapon to cryogenically suspend himself and Tim, forcing the Black Lanterns to retreat as they are unable to read any sign of life of them. Deadman later revives the former Boy Wonders.

=== The Return of Bruce Wayne ===
Talia begins to clone Damian as she realizes that her son has completely sided with Dick Grayson and the Bat-Family. Damian finally stands up for his Robin mantle, telling Talia that being Robin was the best thing that he had ever done, and Talia does not need to save him from something he chooses to be. Talia then shows Damian a cloned version of himself, whom she sees as Damian's younger brother. Talia admits to Damian that even though she loves him, she is too much of a perfectionist to admire him for choosing a path that defies her so blatantly, and he is therefore no longer welcome and will be considered an enemy of the House of al Ghul. Damian defiantly replies that he hopes to be a worthy one. Damian (as Robin) is then seen teaming up with Dick and Alfred to begin their own search for Bruce Wayne.

During a confrontation with a returned minor villain, the Getaway Genius, Damian is initially angry that Grayson failed to capture the foe – as well as the implication that his father failed as well during the Genius' original run back when Grayson was Robin – but when Dick explains to him that Bruce let the Genius go because he discovered that the Genius' robberies were only him stealing medicines that he needed so that he could live long enough to see his daughter grow up, Damian realizes that he never really knew his father as a person, and admits that there was more to him than Batman.

After Grayson's confidant, Oberon Sexton, is revealed to be the Joker in disguise, Damian tortures the villain by savagely beating him with a crowbar to get information, considering it to be self-defense since the Joker planned to attack him. However, the Joker's apparent helplessness is revealed to be another ruse and he incapacitates Damian with his hidden Joker venom. The villain intends to use Damian and Dick in his fight against their common enemies: the Black Glove. Help arrives in the form of the original Batman. After Bruce Wayne helps Dick and Damian defeat the Black Glove and the Joker, Wayne accepts his son in addition to his role as Robin. Despite Bruce's parental responsibilities to Damian, he decides that he prefers Damian to continue working with Dick (who maintains the Batman mantle and whom Bruce sees as a positive role model for his son) rather than being with himself primarily, due to his plans with Batman Inc.

=== Teen Titans ===
Damian joins the Teen Titans when Dick Grayson concludes that the team needs a Robin, while also feeling that Damian would benefit from the friendship of other heroes, having progressed to the point where he can be trusted not to kill if left 'unsupervised'. Although Wonder Girl objects to this decision, Grayson convinces her to let Damian stay on the team as he needs Damian to learn that he can trust others not to betray him, only for his temper to jeopardize his first mission with the team when he attacks an opponent just after Raven had convinced him to calm down, provoking their new foe into starting his wave of destruction again. Robin eventually begins to develop a friendship with Ravager, who initially reaches out to Damian due to their similar upbringings (Ravager's father being the notorious assassin, Deathstroke). Tim Drake eventually comes to the Titans for help after a robotic duplicate of Calculator attempts to murder his close friend, Tam Fox, and decides to rejoin the team once the mission is completed. Damian chooses to leave the team upon Drake's return, reasoning that the Teen Titans do not need two Robins, and realizing that his teammates prefer to work with Tim. Upon returning to Gotham, Damian tells Dick that even though he had been brought to the Titans to find friends, he did not need to, as he already had one, Grayson himself.

When Black Bat, Stephanie Brown's predecessor, returns to Gotham, she and Damian are partnered together during a stake-out to catch the Architect, a new villain obsessed with destroying Gotham landmarks. Damian berates Black Bat and mocks her for being sent to Hong Kong by his father, but she ultimately saves his life. Afterward, the two work together to stop the bomber from destroying a massive bridge, saving dozens of lives in the process.

=== The New 52 ===
Damian Wayne in Batman and Robin vol. 2, #5 (March 2012). Art by Patrick Gleason.

Following the "Flashpoint" story arc, Bruce Wayne was returned by writers as being the only Batman in 2011's the New 52 relaunch of DC Comics. Dick Grayson was returned to his previous role as Nightwing, and Damian still serves as his father's vigilante partner Robin. After reading the letter written by his father from an alternate timeline, the Dark Knight decides that it is time to take steps to put his past behind him. He tries to teach Damian the same values his parents have instilled within him as he finally assumes his role as a father. However, despite Bruce's attempts to build a relationship with his son, Damian remains distant from him, which Alfred worries about. Although this relationship is further strained when Damian seemingly leaves Wayne Manor to join the villain Nobody, it turns out this was a ruse by Damian to bring him down. Although Damian eventually kills Nobody in front of Bruce, they are able to work through the incident by beginning to actively understand and respect one another as father and son. Bruce goes so far as to conceal the event from Dick and Tim, leading Alfred to comment to Bruce that he has become "quite the overprotective parent".

Damian defies his father's orders to remain in the Batcave and investigates Alfred's kidnapping. The investigation leads to Gotham Zoo where Damian is captured by Joker. Joker accuses Damian and the other members of Batman's family of being a burden that prevents Batman from being the best foe for Joker. Joker tells Damian that his and Batman's greatest fear is being responsible for the other's death. Joker then presents Damian with Batman in Joker makeup, and states that Damian must kill Batman before Batman kills him. Unwilling to kill his father, Damian chooses death, but the Joker kills Batman before he can deal a fatal blow. Damian passes out from Joker venom and Batman is revealed to be a fake; as Damian recovers from the toxin, the Joker presents him with a cloche. The Joker is eventually defeated by Batman, but the trust between Batman and the Batman Family is shattered.

During the "Leviathan" story arc, when his mother Talia puts a price on his head and is targeted by the most dangerous and skilled assassins, Bruce fakes Damian's death and secluded him in the Batcave to protect him while he goes undercover to confront Talia and her minions. But against his father's wishes, Damian escapes, donning a new costume under the name of Redbird.

Along with the mysterious Wingman and most of the Bat-family, Damian manages to rescue his father and defeat most of the League of Shadows. However, Batman explains that the temporary defeat of the League will not stop a larger force to attack later and destroy the city, so he comes to the extreme decision that the only solution possible is for Damian to return to his mother, a decision that causes an emotional reaction from Damian.

==== Death ====
Damian is fighting hordes of Leviathan henchmen in the lobby of Wayne Tower when Nightwing comes to rescue him. Behind cover, the two briefly reminisce about their time together as Batman and Robin before resuming the defense. When Heretic (a clone of Damian) arrives and knocks Nightwing out, Damian bravely fights him. However, Heretic eventually gains the upper hand and impales Damian through the chest, the sword piercing Damian's heart and resulting in Damian dying almost instantly. Minutes after Damian's death, Batman arrives and sees Damian's dead body. Angered, he and a revived Nightwing battle Heretic, but are eventually forced to retreat with Red Robin and Damian's body. After holding a private funeral for Damian, Bruce vows to avenge his death.

When Batman and Nightwing finally re-confront Heretic, they overpower him, and the clone suffers a brutal beating from both in retaliation for Damian's death. Batman, despite desiring to kill his son's murderer more than anything and Nightwing making no attempts of stopping his mentor, spares Heretic after seeing his resemblance to Damian, realizing the clone is what is left of his son. However, Talia later kills Heretic for his failure to kill Batman and challenges Batman to a duel to the death in the Batcave. Talia is killed following the duel by Kathy Webb, and it is later revealed that Damian's body was stolen from the Manor cemetery by the League of Assassins along with Talia's for plans against Batman in addition to making their resurrections. It has also been shown that Ra's al Ghul has begun to engineer more clones of Damian.

==== Return ====
Glorious Godfrey arrives on Earth to retrieve the Chaos Shard, a powerful crystal that once belonged to Darkseid. After detecting a trace signature of the shard in Damian's body, Godfrey escapes with Damian's corpse back to Apokolips, despite assistance from the Justice League. Angered, Batman vows to retrieve Damian's corpse.

Batman retrieves an unstable exosuit known as the Hellbat armor, designed members to engage large-scale threats. He then activates the Boom Tube to Apokolips to retrieve Damian's corpse. Batman successfully retrieve Damian as he and his team return to Earth via the Boom Tube directly to the Batcave after escaping from Darkseid's forces. After this, Batman uses the Chaos Shard on Damian, resurrecting him. The Shard grants Damian superhuman abilities, which soon fade.

Damian Wayne in DC Rebirth; art by Jim Lee, Scott Williams, and Lex Sinclair

==== Robin: Son of Batman ====
After the events of Batman: Endgame that resulted in Bruce Wayne's disappearance, Damian, as Robin, sets out on a globe-spanning journey to forge his own destiny and make amends for all of his wrongdoings in his own series, titled Robin: Son of Batman. Along his journey, he crosses paths with Ra's and Talia al Ghul, Deathstroke, and a new character named Maya Ducard, daughter of the late villain, Nobody. Damian plays a particular role in Batman and Robin Eternal when the Bat-Family is pitted against Mother, a ruthless woman who believes that she can make her 'children' stronger by putting them through intense trauma. Returning to assist his fellow Robins as the crisis reaches its conclusion, Damian helps Dick, Jason, and Tim regain confidence in themselves after Mother decimates their initial efforts against her.

Damian is also a major player in the Robin War event, where he, Agent 37 (Dick Grayson), Red Hood, and Red Robin organize a street gang called "Robins" to defeat the Court of Owls with reluctant aid from Jim Gordon, who is now Batman. In the climax, the Court manipulates Damian into joining them so they can use him to recruit Agent 37. Dick does join them to save Damian and end the war. In the aftermath, Robin forms an unlikely partnership with his mother Talia.

=== DC Rebirth ===
As part of DC's 2016 relaunch of its titles, DC Rebirth, Damian was featured in three titles: Teen Titans, where he becomes the team's leader to defeat Ra's al Ghul and succeed Red Robin (Tim Drake) as leader; Super Sons, co-starring with Jon Kent, the son of Superman and the new Superboy; and Nightwing, where he has a supporting role. Superboy and Damian make a new hero duo.

==== Teen Titans Rebirth ====
On his 13th birthday, Damian is sent a package by his grandfather Ra's al Ghul which contains a dead robin. After a meeting with his mother Talia, he discovers that it is a warning from his cousin Mara al Ghul, who has chosen him as her prey as part of an initiation ritual that she must undertake to properly join the League of Assassins. Mara has been made leader of a group known as the Demon's Fist, which was originally supposed to be led by Damian, but became hers when he chose to leave the League. They, too, have chosen targets that they must hunt down to ascend to the League. Damian decides to collect the other Demon's Fist's targets to form the new Teen Titans; this includes Starfire, Beast Boy, Raven, and Kid Flash.

After the events of Justice League: No Justice, the Titans disband. In his subsequent struggle with organized crime in Gotham and a mysterious crime lord known as The Other, Damian assembles a new team of Titans, consisting of Kid Flash, Roundhouse, Red Arrow, Crush, and Djinn. This new team faces initial difficulties because of Red Arrow's criticism and the individualistic tendencies of several members. During a case in which Gizmo nearly detonates a nuclear device, Robin uses the ring to which Djinn is bound to grant her the use of her full powers to avert the crisis, and returns it afterwards, refusing to assume mastery over her. This earns him Djinn's trust, which gradually begins to turn into a mutual romantic attraction. However, what Damian does not tell his teammates is that a deep cellar of the Titans' headquarters, a former juvenile detention facility, serves him as a secret prison.

When the other Titans learn of the prison, conflict erupts within the team until Crush's father Lobo arrives looking for her. Djinn defeats him by altering his memory, and proceeds to do so with the other criminals Damian captures, giving them new, harmless identities.

==== Super Sons ====
In this book, Robin teams up with Superman's 10-year-old son Jonathan Kent, who he befriended previously during a test facilitated by Batman and Superman. Together, they form the Super Sons. In the first volume, Damian and Jon team against Kid Amazo, a child affected by a virus which grants powers to ordinary humans. They defeat him and Damian decides to train Jon, but Jon's desire to join the Teen Titans against Damian's wishes creates ongoing conflict between the boys. Batman and Superman construct an underwater base for the Super Sons, which Jon refers to as the "Fortress of Attitude," much to Damian's chagrin. The team returned in The Adventures of the Super-Sons, where they spend their summer pursuing justice against Rex Luthor, an alien child who imitates Lex Luthor. Despite the book's cancellation, the characters have subsequently appeared as a team in other series.

==== No More Teen Titans ====
After the death of Alfred Pennyworth, and Dick Grayson losing his memories thanks to the villain KGBeast, Damian began to see his father's view of justice versus fear as not enough. Instead, Damian decides to begin killing criminals to invoke true fear in his enemies. This decision, coupled with his recently adopted practice of holding criminals against their will and wiping their memories, leads Djinn to leave the Teen Titans, while Kid Flash, Red Arrow, Crush, and Roundhouse turn against him. Damian attempts to kill KGBeast, but only succeeds in cutting off his left arm before the Titans intervene and stop him. Batman then arrives, having learned of his son's actions, declaring that the Teen Titans are finished. At that moment, Deathstroke attacks the Titans and Batman with the intent to kill them all. Damian pursues Deathstroke and attempts to kill him, but the Titans again intervene. Red Arrow is injured and Deathstroke escapes. Batman tries to convince Robin to come home with him, but Damian attacks him. At the height of his anger and frustration, Damian rips the Robin insignia off his chest and gives it to Batman. Declaring himself free, Damian leaves for parts unknown.

==== Robin (2021) ====
After Damian leaves the Teen Titans, they, along with members of the Bat-family and Superboy, try to find him, but Damian is able to evade their efforts. While helping the Teen Titans battle the super criminals Mammoth and Shimmer, Superboy discovers a note from Damian to him. It is not directly revealed what was in the note, but it makes Superboy realize that wherever Damian is, they will not find him. Damian also leaves a note for the Teen Titans which contains a set of coordinates leading them into a meeting with Nightwing. Nightwing explains that Damian encouraged him to have the remaining members of the Titans and Teen Titans work together in spite of the Justice League's disapproval. This leads to a new version of the Titans forming, consisting of Nightwing, Cyborg, Raven, Starfire, Beast Boy, Troia, Crush, Roundhouse, Red Arrow, and Kid Flash.

After having his own dedicated story arc in 2021, entitled "Demon or Detective", Damian starred in the ongoing "Robin" series written by Joshua Williamson which centered around Damian going on a solo journey to discover the mysterious League of Lazarus through competing in the Lazarus tournament with Ravager, Connor Hawke, and Flatline, an apprentice of one of his father's enemies with whom he develops a romantic relationship. During the tournament, he discovers that the host of the tournament is his maternal great-grandmother, Ruh al Ghul, who was imprisoned on this island by her son, Ra's al Ghul. At the conclusion of the first arc, both Damian's mother and grandfather arrive to aid him in defeating Ruh and, in the aftermath of this arc, he returns to live with them in their palace up until the events of "Shadow War."

=== "Shadow War" ===
After observing how happy both his daughter and grandson are while living a peaceful life without killing, the now reformed Ra's al Ghul decides that he wants to turn himself in to the authorities to atone for all the crimes he committed, as well as publicly share all the secrets he kept hidden over the centuries. This decision sparks a huge interest in both the superhero community and the villain community due the amount of knowledge the immortal Demon's Head has about the world, so all eyes are on him during a press conference he holds before his incarceration. However, as soon as the conference starts, Ra's is immediately shot by a sniper wearing a Deathstroke-looking costume, who also throws a bomb that turns his body to ash to insure that there would be nothing left of him to be resurrected through the Lazarus Pit.

This incident deeply hurts both Damian and his mother, Talia, who had to watch her father get murdered even though he finally made the right choice for the first time in his life and was willing to turn a new leaf for his family's sake. In her grief, she gathers all the members of the League of Assassins and puts a hit on Deathstroke, as well as all of his associates, in retaliation for killing her father. On the other hand, Damian has teamed-up with his father, who is not fully convinced that it was the real Deathstroke who killed Ra's al Ghul, to investigate the murder and find out who is really behind it.

This event concludes with "Shadow War" between the League of Assassins and Deathstroke Inc, which ends with Talia killing Slade in a one-on-one battle, But shortly afterward the Deathstroke imposter reveals himself to be Geo-Force, who plotted the whole war in the hope of having both Slade and Talia kill each other. Damian and Bruce arrive shortly and help Talia defeat Geo-Force, with Damian managing to convince his mother to not kill Geo-Force afterward because his grandfather believed that their family could be better than this.

=== Dawn of DC ===
Damian decides to move back in with Bruce and together they reform the Dynamic Duo. Bruce forces Damian to go to school to connect with those his age more, but the kids at school bully Damian, and he skips to investigate a new villain - Shush - with Batman.

== Skills and abilities ==
First trained by the League of Assassins before later having other mentors such as Batman and Dick Grayson, Damian is considered a expert martial artist and assassin. He is also extensively trained as a detective and crime-fighter, allowing knowledge in forensics science, criminology, escapology, and disguise. He also possesses great athletic ability with gymnast training, his high intelligence marks him as a genius, and he has supernatural knowledge that allows for magic with assistance from arcane objects. With access to the same technology as Batman, Damian often wears a armored suit and a utility belt with gadgets similar to Batman's own.

== Background and appearance ==
Damian Wayne on Batman and Robin #1 (August 2009). Art by Frank Quitely.

Concerning the character's artificial gestation in respect to the al Ghuls' notable idealization of Bruce Wayne as the optimal specimen in leading the League of Assassins, Damian Wayne is warranted to be notably depicted in bearing a stark resemblance to his father.

After stealing Jason Todd's Robin tunic and mask from his memorial case, Damian's unofficial appearance as Robin was wearing them over his black and white League of Assassins bodysuit with a grayish hood and cape. He carried a pair of brass knuckles, which he incorporated as part of this costume, and would also carry a sword.

After Dick Grayson officially sanctioned Damian's role as Robin, while a standard Robin tunic was retained, the bodysuit was replaced with a black survival suit, the grayish cape with a yellow "para-cape" which grants him a gliding capability, the black mask with a green one, a bulkier utility belt to carry more weapons and gadgetry, a black hood, and green gloves and flexible boots.

In DC Rebirth, Damian's suit is modified. The gauntlets and boots are more armored and he has knee pads now. His cape is now black on the outside with the cape and hood having a yellow trim. His tunic is longer and has a yellow trim as well.

After running away from Batman, Damian gets a brand-new Robin suit in his solo series. It differs greatly from most Robin suits. It is entirely black and gray with a red trim around the knees, chest, and collar. The Robin logo is red with a black "R". He retains his old black and yellow cape and green domino mask.

As of age 13, Damian was short for his age and had few other markers of impending puberty. In Super Sons, it was a running joke that he was frequently mistaken as younger than 10-year-old Jon Kent.

== Other versions ==
- A possible future version of Damian Wayne / Batman appears in Batman #666 (2007), Batman #700 (2010), and Superman/Batman #75.
- A possible future version of Damian Wayne appears in Justice League: Generation Lost #14.
- A possible future version of Damian Wayne appears in the DC Rebirth Batman Beyond series. This version succeeded his grandfather to become the new Ra's Al Ghul until an encounter with his estranged father and Terry McGinnis leads to Damian reforming and beginning to reconcile with Bruce Wayne.
- A Bizarro counterpart of Robin called Robzarro appears in "Boyzarro Re-Death". He is a member of the Bizarro Boyz.
- An alternate universe version of Damian Wayne appears in Dark Nights: Metal.
- An alternate universe version of Damian Wayne / Batman appears in DCeased.

== In other media ==
=== Television ===
Damian Wayne as depicted in Batman: The Brave and the Bold (2008).

- Damian Wayne as Robin and Batman appears in the Batman: The Brave and the Bold episode "The Knights of Tomorrow!", voiced by Patrick Cavanaugh and Diedrich Bader, respectively. This version is the son of Batman and Selina Kyle who becomes Robin after his parents are killed by the Joker and fights alongside Dick Grayson / Batman to bring him to justice. In time, Damian succeeds Grayson as Batman and has a son (voiced by Bader's son Sebastian), who assumes the mantle of Robin.
- Damian Wayne appears in the DC Super Hero Girls episode "Kid Napped", voiced by Grey Griffin.
- An infant Damian Wayne makes non-speaking cameo appearances in Young Justice.
- Damian Wayne appears in Harley Quinn, voiced by Jacob Tremblay. This version is presented as less capable of fighting than other iterations of the character and is not taken seriously by most individuals in the show. Additionally, he was raised by Batman after Talia al Ghul left him in his care as a baby.
- Damian Wayne / Little Batman appears in Bat-Fam, voiced by Yonas Kibreab.

=== Film ===
- Damian Wayne appears in films set in the DC Animated Movie Universe (DCAMU), voiced by Stuart Allan. This version is a member of the Teen Titans and in a relationship with Raven.
- Damian Wayne appears in the Lego films Lego DC Comics Super Heroes: Justice League: Gotham City Breakout, Lego DC Comics Super Heroes: Aquaman – Rage of Atlantis and Lego DC Batman: Family Matters, voiced by Scott Menville.
- Damian Wayne appears in Batman Unlimited: Mech vs. Mutants, voiced by Lucien Dodge.
- A Feudal Japan-inspired incarnation of Damian Wayne appears in Batman Ninja, voiced by Yuki Kaji in Japanese and by Yuri Lowenthal in English.
- Damian Wayne appears in Batman vs. Teenage Mutant Ninja Turtles, voiced by Ben Giroux.
- Damian Wayne appears in Batman: Death in the Family.
- Damian Wayne appears in Injustice, voiced by Zach Callison.
- Damian Wayne appears in Batman and Superman: Battle of the Super Sons, voiced by Jack Griffo.
- Damian Wayne appears in Merry Little Batman, voiced by Yonas Kibreab.
- Damian Wayne appears in Batman Ninja vs. Yakuza League, voiced again by Yuki Kaji in Japanese and Bryson Baugus in English. Additionally, the Feudal Japan-inspired incarnation makes a cameo appearance.
- Damian Wayne will appear in The Brave and the Bold.

=== Video games ===
- Damian Wayne appears as a playable character in Lego Batman 2: DC Super Heroes, voiced by Charlie Schlatter.
- Damian Wayne appears as a character summon in Scribblenauts Unmasked: A DC Comics Adventure.
- An alternate universe version of Damian Wayne appears as a playable character in Injustice: Gods Among Us, voiced by Neal McDonough. This version assumed the mantle of Nightwing after accidentally killing Dick Grayson and joined Superman's Regime.
- An alternate universe version of Damian Wayne appears in Infinite Crisis, voiced by James Arnold Taylor. This version comes from the "Nightmare" universe.
- The Injustice incarnation of Damian Wayne as Robin appears as a playable character in Injustice 2, voiced by Scott Porter. Additionally, he appears as Nightwing in the story mode.
- Damian Wayne appears as a playable character in DC Unchained.
- Damian Wayne appears as a playable character in Lego DC Super-Villains, voiced again by Stuart Allan.
- Damian Wayne was meant to appear in a new Batman game by WB Games Montreal, but the project was cancelled.
- Damian Wayne appears as a playable character in DC: Dark Legion, voiced by Ryan Colt Levy.

=== Miscellaneous ===
- The Injustice incarnation of Damian Wayne appears in the Injustice: Gods Among Us prequel comic.
- The Injustice incarnation of Damian Wayne appears in Injustice vs. Masters of the Universe. By this time, he has assumed the mantle of Batman and realized the error of his ways, only to be killed by Wonder Woman for it.
- Damian Wayne appears in DC x Sonic the Hedgehog: Metal Legion.
