= George Shaw (composer) =

American composer

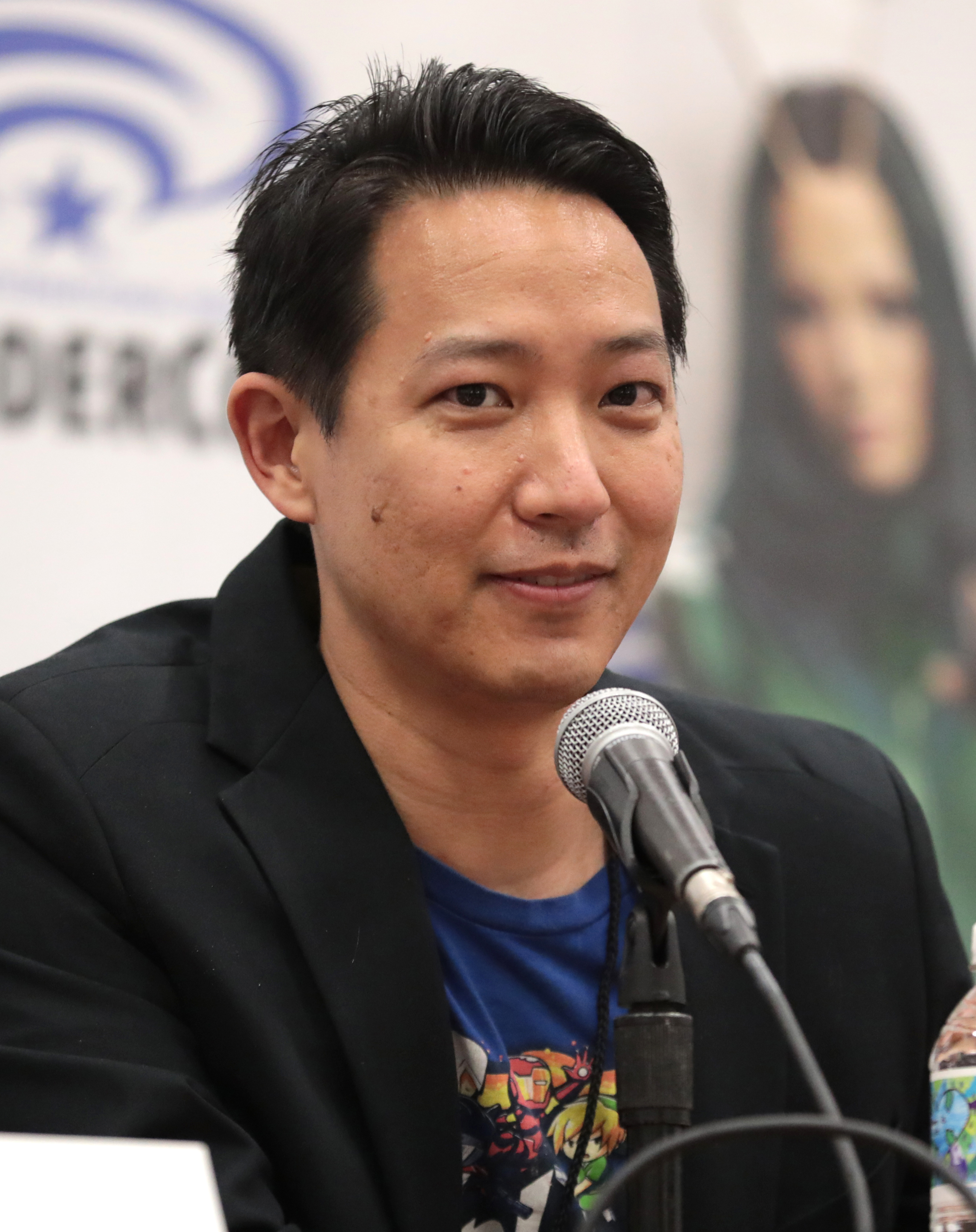
- Shaw at the 2023 WonderCon

Background information
- Born: Houston, Texas
- Occupations: Film composer and Musician

George Shaw (born in Houston, Texas) is an American film composer and musician. His parents came originally from Taiwan. He has composed original music that can be heard on many videos on YouTube as well as a number of short films. He has also worked as an orchestrator on such films as Kiss Kiss Bang Bang, Ghost Rider and Robotech: The Shadow Chronicles.

== Work ==
YouTube videos featuring Shaw's music have accumulated over 150 million views. He has provided the music for content from top YouTube personalities including Ryan Higa, KevJumba, Wong Fu Productions (including the short films Buffet starring Harry Shum Jr., Strangers, Again with David Choi, and Too Fast starring Randall Park), Michelle Phan (including Phan's Paris-set short film Rouge in Love directed by Phan and Evan Jackson Leong), Joe Penna, The Fung Brothers, and more. For instance, Shaw composed the score for the Ryan Higa and Wong Fu Productions short film collaboration, Agents of Secret Stuff, which accumulated over three million views upon the first five days of its release. Shaw also composed the theme and music for Joey Graceffa's YouTube Red show, Escape the Night.

Shaw has composed the score for films such as Ryan Kawamoto's Hang Loose starring Kevin Wu (KevJumba) and Dante Basco, the horror feature film J-ok'el (winning an award at the Park City Music Festival for the score), sci-fi comedy film Flashback, and the documentary, Uploaded: The Asian American Movement. He has also composed the score for short films such as Jeffrey Gee Chin's Lil Tokyo Reporter, starring Academy Award winner Chris Tashima as Sei Fujii, Timothy Tau's Keye Luke starring Feodor Chin as Keye Luke (winning an award for "Best Original Score" from Asians on Film for the score), short films from Wong Fu Productions including Agents of Secret Stuff, Buffet (with Harry Shum Jr.), Strangers, Again (with David Choi) and Too Fast (with Randall Park), Michelle Phan's Rouge in Love, Wesley Du's Dumpling, John Raposas' *Truth, an episode of Eric Won's webseries The Division and more.

== Awards ==
Shaw won a "Best Original Score" award from Asians on Film for composing the score of Timothy Tau's short film, Keye Luke. Shaw has also won a "Best Original Score for an Indie Film" from the 2012 Hollywood Music in Media Awards for his score of Michelle Phan's popular short film set in Paris, Rouge in Love, which has accumulated over 2 million hits on YouTube and was directed by both Evan Jackson Leong (the director of the Sundance documentary Linsanity) and Michelle Phan.

At the Park City Music Festival, Shaw won two "Gold Medals for Excellence": in 2007, for the feature horror film J-ok'el (Best Impact of Music in a Feature Film - Artistic Excellence), and in 2006, for a number of films, including NaRhee Ahn's Purity.

== Albums ==
Shaw has released several albums of his work, including: Spoiler Alert, which was made possibly partly by Kickstarter.

== Education ==
Shaw is a graduate of the University of Southern California, where he studied composition and film scoring.
