= David Choi discography =

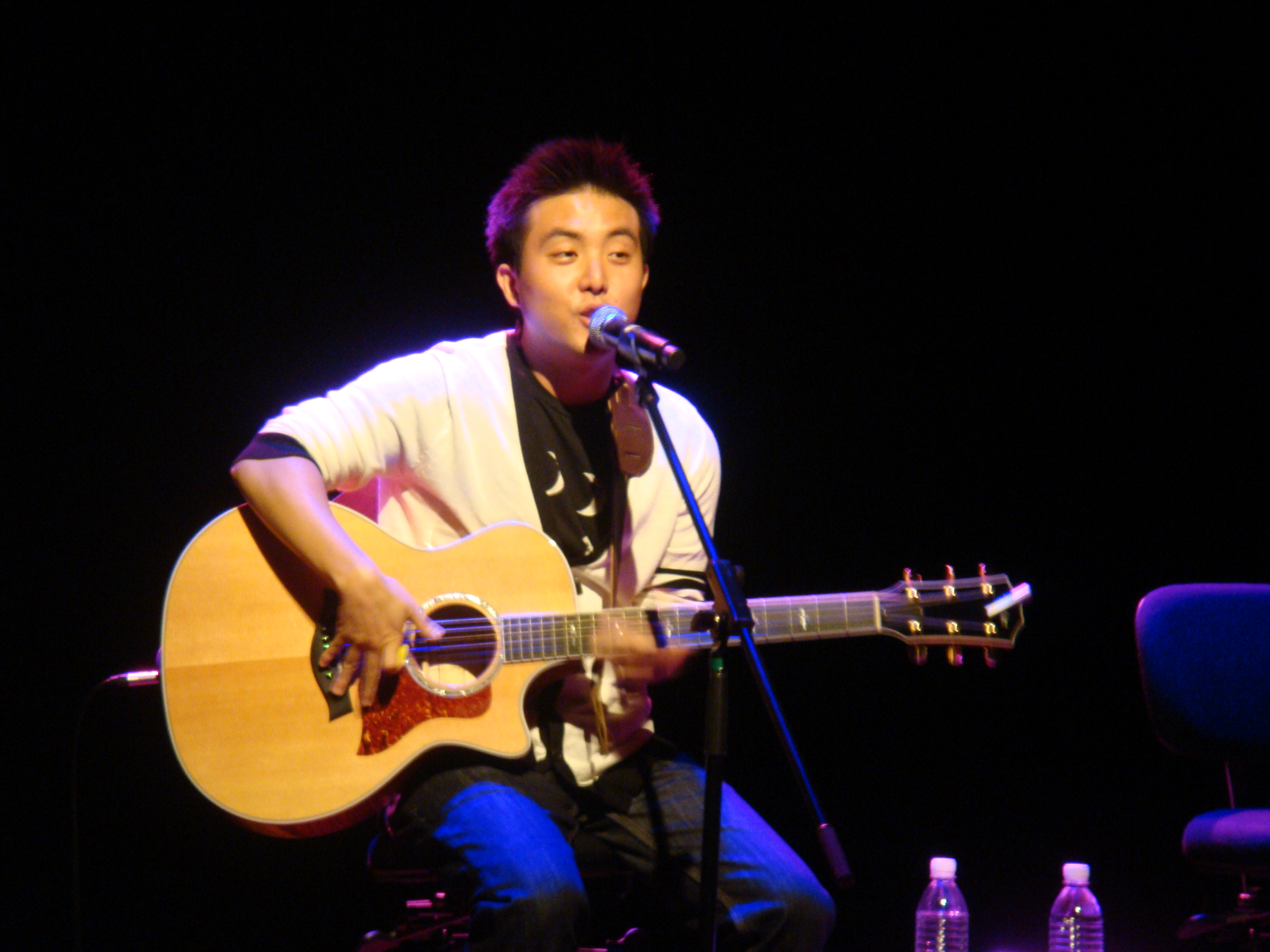
- David Choi at the Esplanade Recital Studio introducing his new song "This And That".
- Studio albums: 3
- Tribute albums: 2
- Singles: 6
- Music videos: 9
- Special editions: 2
- Featured singles: 4
- Soundtrack appearances: 2
- Originals (albumless): 15
- Promotional songs: 1

The discography of independent Korean-American (US-born Asian) artist David Choi includes a total of 55 songs (as of June 2011), self-written and collaborated, 3 studio albums, with 1 coming October 2011, 5 singles, 9 music videos, 2 cover albums, 2 special editions, 4 collaborations, 3 songs for two soundtracks, 15 albumless originals and 1 promotional song over a span of 11 years (2000–2011). David Choi has released few songs for sale on iTunes and has distributed his 2 studio albums, titled Only You and By My Side, physically.

All releases were and are released independently, without help of any record label. Choi owns all rights to them and the master recordings. He is also the sole songwriter of all 55 songs, also the sole composer and performer, except for some collaborations.

== Studio albums ==
David released his first studio album, Only You, in August 2008 on iTunes and in October 2008, physically. It was accompanied with his first single Won't Even Start. He released his second album in May 2010, and his third single That Girl, which was written in 2003. He has announced in gigs that he will be unveiling "Forever and Ever" with new songs in the month of October 2011.

2008
Only You

2010
By My Side

2011
Forever and Ever

2015
Stories of Yous' and Me

== Singles ==
Over 11 years, David has released only 6 official singles, many of which have been written earlier than 2008, though many originals are released the way singles are themselves, but free. He has 3 independent singles (singles which were originally accompanied no albums at time of release) and 3 singles released accompanying an album. David has also hinted the release of another song, This And That, in his upcoming third album, as a single, though it might not end up as one.

By My Side

1. That Girl (Released May 18, 2010)
2. By My Side (Releasing July 7, 2011)

Only You

1. Won't Even Start (Released October 28, 2008)

Other singles

- Valentines (Released March 1, 2009)
- We'll Make It Last All Afternoon (Released December 1, 2009)
- I Choose Happiness (Released June 28, 2011)

== Music videos ==
In 2008, David released his first music video, in collaboration with artist Kina Grannis, for their song, My Time With You, and it has since fetched 1.29 million over views. Since that year, David Choi has released 8 music videos, 7 for singles and 1 for a song. All have fetch a million over views on video-sharing website YouTube. He collaborates with production company Wong Fu Productions most of the time and has produced four music videos with them. He also made a video for a song called "I Choose Happiness" which the instrumental version is what KevJumba and Wong Fu Productions always use in their videos. It will appear in the new 2011 movie "Lucky".

Song	Single?	Date of release	Special cameo	Producers
My Time With You	Yes (featured)	Aug 12, 2008	-	David Choi and Kina Grannis
Won't Even Start	Yes	May 5, 2009	Lana McKissack	Wong Fu Productions
I Can Get Used To This	No	Aug 31, 2009	-	David Choi and Jude Weng
That Girl	Yes	May 18, 2010	Julia Chang	Wong Fu Productions
Dance To This Song	Yes (featured)	Aug 3, 2010	Kina Grannis, Jeri Lee and Far East Movement	Wong Fu Productions and KevJumba
I'm Hardcore	Yes (featured)	Jan 25, 2011	Chester See	David Choi, Ryan Higa and JR Aquino
The Way You Are	Yes (featured)	Feb 16, 2011	-	David Choi and Kina Grannis
I Choose Happiness	Yes	June 28, 2011	"Lucky" snippet	David Choi
By My Side	Yes	July 7, 2011	Jenny Ong	Wong Fu Productions

== Cover albums ==
David has produced and released a two-part cover album, separated into two albums, titled "YouTube Covers". Altogether, it contains 26 famous tracks covered by him and uploaded on video-sharing website YouTube. It was released in July 2010, after his album by My Side.

Volume 1

1. I'm Yours (originally by Jason Mraz)
2. OMG (originally by Usher)
3. I Gotta Feeling (originally by The Black Eyed Peas)
4. California Gurls (originally by Katy Perry)
5. Bad Romance (originally by Lady Gaga)
6. Poker Face (originally by Lady Gaga)
7. Breakeven (originally by The Script)
8. Need You Now (originally by Lady Antebellum)
9. Telephone (originally by Lady Gaga)
10. Viva la Vida (originally by Coldplay)
11. Wonderwall (originally by Oasis)
12. Who I Am (originally by Nick Jonas & the Administration)
13. Replay (originally by Iyaz)

Volume 2

1. Womanizer (originally by Britney Spears)
2. Fireflies (originally by Owl City)
3. Hey, Soul Sister (originally by Train)
4. Use Somebody (originally by Kings of Leon)
5. How Deep Is Your Love (originally by Bee Gees)
6. My Life Would Suck Without You (originally by Kelly Clarkson)
7. Imagine (originally by John Lennon)
8. Ben (originally by Michael Jackson)
9. Something (originally by The Beatles)
10. Who Says (originally by John Mayer)
11. Love Me Tender (originally by Elvis Presley)
12. The Way You Make Me Feel (originally by Michael Jackson)
13. Sunday Morning (originally by Maroon 5)

== Special editions ==
David has released 2 special editions of his 2 studio albums, By My Side and Only You, in Korea. They include nothing more than a different cover, 3 bonus tracks (Only You) and 2 bonus tracks (By My Side). They are only available in Korea.

== Collaborations ==
David has collaborated with semi-notable figures such as Kina Grannis, Ryan Higa, Kevin Wu, Philip Wang and even Far East Movement (though not actually doing a song). He has produced 4 singles out of these collaborations, 2 were released on iTunes, 1 taken down from iTunes and another released free. All four singles are accompanied with a music video.

== Soundtrack appearances ==
He has appeared on 1 soundtrack, for Korean Drama All My Love. The original soundtrack contained two of his albumless songs, Happily Ever After and its Korean counterpart. Also, in 2011, he might appear on a soundtrack for movie Lucky for his song I Choose Happiness.

== Originals ==
David has a few original songs, all of which are albumless. They are released free on his official website, but as they go accompanying the album through the years, they are taken down, like his humorous love song, My Company. Originals also include the time when he made songs out of his YouTube fans' love stories, in which he did with Starburst. He has made 4 songs in this side-project.

The list is shown here in two columns:

Originals

- YouTube (A Love Song)
- Pick It
- Mr. Audio Preview
- It's Rad To Pick Your Nose
- I Got A Coco Bidet
- Fart
- Doesn't It All Taste Good
- I Fart Like Everyone
- WALK
- Spinach Stew
- Please Don't Touch My Junk

"Starburst" project

1. Happiness Is Always Near
2. High School
3. TMI
4. Grade Three

All songs written, composed and performed by David Choi.

== Promotional ==
As a parody of B.o.B and Bruno Mars' Nothin' on You, David overwrote the lyrics and did a song for his favourite restaurant Chick-fil-A. It was entitled Nothing on a Chick-fil-A.
