= Ki Hong Lee =

American actor (born 1986)

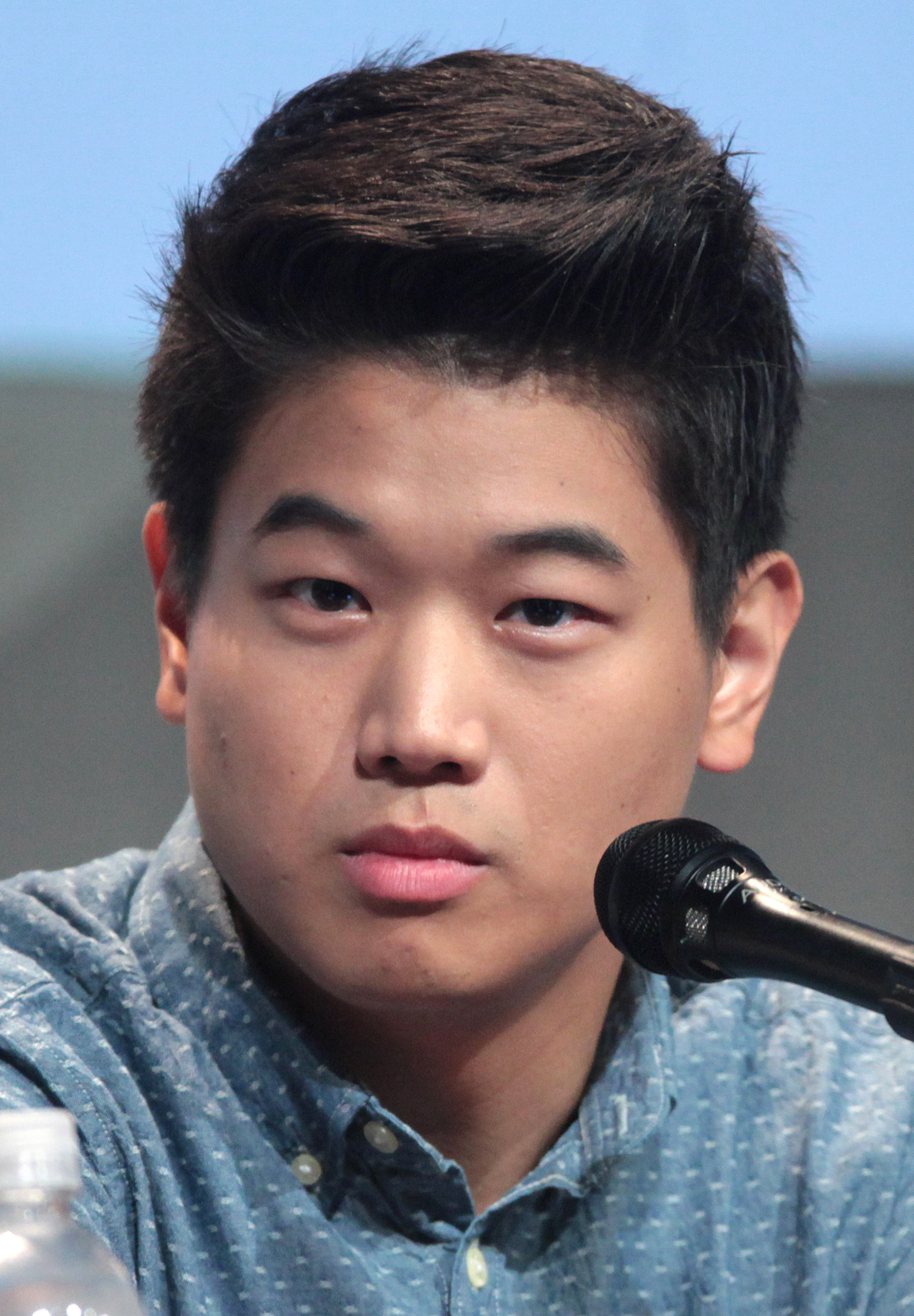
- Lee at the 2015 San Diego Comic-Con
- Born: Lee Ki-hong; September 30, 1986 (age 40); Seoul, South Korea
- Education: University of California, Berkeley (BA)
- Occupation: Actor
- Years active: 2010–present
- Agent: Saram Entertainment
- Spouse: Hayoung Choi (m. 2015)
- Children: 2

Korean name
- Hangul: 이기홍
- RR: I Gihong
- MR: I Kihong

Ki Hong Lee (born September 30, 1986) is an American actor. He is best known for his roles as Minho in the Maze Runner film series and Dong Nguyen in the Netflix sitcom Unbreakable Kimmy Schmidt.

== Early life and education ==
Lee was born in Seoul, South Korea, on September 30, 1986. When he was six years old, his parents moved the family to Auckland, New Zealand. When he was eight, his family moved to Los Angeles, California.

Lee studied psychology at the University of California, Berkeley from 2004 to 2008. During college, Lee was part of a college chapter of Liberty in North Korea (LiNK) and interned at their headquarters. He served as an elected senator at the Associated Students of the University of California (the students association of the University of California, Berkeley) from 2005 to 2006, while being affiliated with the Student Action party. He ran for re-election for the 2006–2007 academic year as "Ki Hong (Donkey Kong) Lee" with the affiliation with The Mario Party, but failed to garner the necessary votes for the position.

Lee began acting in middle school, doing skits at church retreats. He initially wanted to become a teacher, but was inspired to pursue acting after watching Aaron Yoo in the film Disturbia (2007) while in college. After college, he worked at his parents' sundubu-jjigae restaurant, Tofu Village, in Little Tokyo while pursuing acting.

== Career ==
Lee made his stage debut in Wrinkles, presented by East West Players and directed by Jeff Liu. It opened on February 16, 2011 and closed on March 13, 2011 at the David Henry Hwang Theater at the Union Center for the Arts in Downtown Los Angeles.

Since 2012, Lee has collaborated with Wong Fu Productions (WFP) featuring in more than five short videos including the Away We Happened mini-series. On June 26, 2014, it was announced that Lee was cast in WFP's first feature film Everything Before Us, which focuses on "two couples at different stages of their relationships, set in a world where "all relationship activity is documented and monitored by the Department of Emotional Integrity (DEI)" and is assigned a number like a credit score." The film also featured The Tomorrow People's Aaron Yoo and Veep's Randall Park.

In 2013, Lee made his feature-length film debut in the YouTube two-part film adaptation of Yellowface, from playwright David Henry Hwang. It was published by the Asian American-centric YOMYOMF network . On April 18, 2013, director Wes Ball announced that Lee had been cast in The Maze Runner as Minho, the keeper of the Runners in charge of navigating and mapping the Maze.

In fall 2017, Lee played the lead in Julia Cho's play, Office Hour, alongside actress Sue Jean Kim in the New York premiere of the production at the Public Theater.

In June 2020, Lee signed an exclusive contract with Saram Entertainment to expand his activities not just in South Korea, but in Asia as a whole.

== Personal life ==
Lee married his childhood friend Hayoung Choi on March 7, 2015. Their daughter was born in late 2016. Choi played Lee's character's new girlfriend in the 2013 short film She Has a Boyfriend, by Wong Fu Productions.

== Filmography ==
=== Film ===
Year	Film	Role	Notes/Ref.
2010	The Social Network	Cambridge Student	Uncredited
2013	Yellow Face	BD Wong	
2014	The Maze Runner	Minho	
2015	The Stanford Prison Experiment	Gavin Chan	
2015	Everything Before Us	Jay	Wong Fu Productions
2015	Maze Runner: The Scorch Trials	Minho	
2017	Two Bellmen Three	Jun Lee	
2017	The Mayor	Steve	
2017	Wish Upon	Ryan Hui	
2018	Maze Runner: The Death Cure	Minho	
2018	The Public	Chip	
2020	Looks That Kill	Dan	

=== Short film ===
Year	Film	Role	Notes
2011	All in All	Jeremy	
2012	Take It Slow	Brian	Wong Fu Productions
2012	Fratervention: The End of Bro'ing Out	Keith	
2012	Away We Happened	Ben	Wong Fu Productions; Mini-Series; 6 episodes
2012	Always You	James	YOMYOMF Network
2012	MotherLover	Chaz Seong	YOMYOMF Network; Miniseries; 6 episodes
2013	The Master Chef	John Suh	Jubilee Project
2013	This Is How We Never Met	Boy	Wong Fu Productions
2013	Somewhere Like This	Boyfriend	Wong Fu Productions
2013	To Those Nights	Elijah bar friends	Wong Fu Productions
2013	She Has a Boyfriend	Frank	Wong Fu Productions
2014	This Time	Manny Park	Jubilee Project
2017	Asian Bachelorette	Tom	Wong Fu Productions
2018	Asian Bachelorette 2	Tom / Tobby	Wong Fu Productions
2020	Si	Si	Directed by Thomas Percy Kim

=== Television ===
Year	Title	Role	Notes/Ref.
2010	Victorious	Clayton	2 episodes
2010	The Secret Life of the American Teenager	Student #2	Episode: "Which Way Did She Go?"
2010	Modern Family	Busboy	Episode: "Mother Tucker"
2011	The Nine Lives of Chloe King	Paul	Main role 10 episodes
2011	New Girl	Hector	Episode: "Bells"
2012	The Client List	Delivery Guy	Episode: "Turn the Page"
2013	Blue Bloods	David Lin	Episode: "The Truth About Lying"
2014	NCIS	Chris Hoffman	Episode: "Bulletproof"
2015–2016	Unbreakable Kimmy Schmidt	Dong Nguyen	Recurring role (8 episodes)
2015	The Whispers	Peter Kim	Episode: "X Marks The Spot"
2019	Whiskey Cavalier	Jung	Episode: "College Confidential"
2019	Prometheus: War of Fire	Frank Lee	
2020	Spider-Man	Amadeus Cho / Totally Awesome Hulk (voice)	2 episodes
2021	Dave	Dan Kim	2 episodes
2021	Robot Chicken	Cody Martin, Naruto (voice)	Episode: "May Cause Lucid Murder Dreams"
2022	Grid	Man from the Future	Special appearance
2022	Little America	Older Luke Song	Episode: "Mr. Song"
2023	Party Down	Howard	Episode: "First Annual PI2A Symposium"
2024	The Irrational	Dae-Min Kim	Episode: "Stan by Me"
2025–present	King of the Hill	Chane Wassanasong / Junichiro (voice)	6 episodes, Replaces Pamela Adlon

=== Stage ===
Year	Title	Role	Notes
2011	Wrinkles	Jason	
2017	Office Hour	Dennis	

=== Video games ===
Year	Title	Role	Notes
2013	Grand Theft Auto V	The Local Population	
2026	Call of Duty: Modern Warfare 4	Ju Kwon	
