= Aki Aleong =

Trinidadian actor (1934–2025)

- Born: Assing Leonard Gonzales Aleong; December 19, 1934; Port of Spain, Trinidad and Tobago
- Died: June 22, 2025 (aged 90); Los Angeles, California, U.S.
- Occupations: Actor; singer
- Years active: 1956–2025

Assing Leonard Gonzales "Aki" Aleong (December 19, 1934 – June 22, 2025) was a Trinidadian actor and singer. He had a lengthy career as a character actor on television and in film, totaling over 130 credits between 1956 and 2025. He also had a career as a music industry executive during the 1960s and '70s.

== Early life ==
Assing Aleong (Chinese: 梁阿成; pinyin: Liáng' Āchéng) was born to Henry Leong (Aleong), a cook from Hong Kong, and Agnes Vera Gonsalves from Saint Vincent and the Grenadines. After his parents divorced, he and his mother moved to Brooklyn, New York in 1949. He attended Brooklyn College and was working part-time at a hardware store, when he answered a casting call for the Broadway play The Teahouse of the August Moon. He was cast in the role of "Goat Boy", launching his acting career.

== Career ==
=== Acting ===
His first important role was in the 1957 movie No Down Payment, which starred Joanne Woodward and Jeffrey Hunter. He was also in two episodes of The Outer Limits, including one with James Doohan (Scotty from Star Trek), where Aleong played Harry Akada. He is known for portraying Senator Hidoshi during the first season of Babylon 5, as well as portraying Mr. Chiang, the aide to Nathan Bates in the weekly series of V: The Series. He also portrayed the character of Colonel Mitamura in Farewell to the King. He owned the Gingham Dog fast food restaurant in Hollywood, California, c. 1965.

Aki appeared as a contestant on the February 6th 1958 episode of Groucho Marx's You Bet Your Life. He and his partner successfully answered the "BIG" money question and won $200,000.

Aleong was a member of the Media Action Network for Asian Americans (MANAA), and was the executive director for Asians in Media.

He starred as "Agent X" in the Wong Fu Productions YouTube short starring Ryan Higa, Agents of Secret Stuff.

He appeared on the television show, Hazel as Mike Shiga and, in 1968, on the TV show The Virginian season 6 episode 7 (Ah Sing vs Wyoming) as Ah Sing. He also appeared in an episode during season one of Walker, Texas Ranger, as a member of the Yakuza, in the episode "A shadow in the night". He also played the manager of a Japanese restaurant in Season 2, Episode 6 of Curb Your Enthusiasm (2001).

He played Major Ngo Doc in the 1987 movie The Hanoi Hilton.

=== Music ===
Aleong co-wrote and produced the nonsense doo-wop record Shombalor by Sheriff and the Ravels for Vee-Jay records in 1958.

He has a listing in the Top Pop Singles 1955–2008 by Joel Whitburn, with "Trade Winds, Trade Winds" appearing in November 1961. The song peaked at No. 101 in Billboard on the "Bubbling Under the Hot 100" charts, and it remained on the chart for four weeks. According to an interview with Aleong on YouTube ("Part 1 of Twyman Creative Insider Interview with Aki Aleong") the song was Number 1 in Los Angeles in 1961. While that is not exactly accurate, "Trade Winds, Trade Winds" did reach Number 10 on KDAY and Number 11 on KRLA, two L.A. Top 40 stations.

In 1963, Aki was the featured vocalist on the mostly instrumental Vee-Jay album "Come Surf With Me" by Aki Aleong and The Nobles. Over the years this has become a popular record collector's album.

Aleong held several music industry positions during the 1960s and '70s. He was a sales and promotion manager for Capitol Records; an assistant vice president of promotion for Polydor Records; an assistant vice president of sales for Liberty Records; and the president of Pan World Records. Aleong worked with acts like The 5th Dimension, The O'Jays, and Bobby Womack, and produced albums for Roy Ayers and Norman Connors.

Aleong left the music industry in 1983 to focus on acting full time.

== Death ==
Aleong died from complications of dementia in Los Angeles on June 22, 2025, at the age of 90.
