= J-ok'el =

- Directed by: Benjamin Williams
- Written by: Jeremy Svenson; Peter Theis; Andy Whitaker
- Produced by: Juan Carlos Arizmendi; Paola Madrazo del Río; Andrés Rodríguez Franco; Benjamin Williams
- Starring: Dee Wallace-Stone; Tom Parker; Ana Patricia Rojo; Diana Bracho; Jesús Ochoa; Angelique Boyer
- Cinematography: Andrew Waruszewski
- Edited by: Slater Dixon
- Music by: George Shaw
- Production companies: Out of Light Entertainment; Maverick Entertainment Group
- Distributed by: Grupo Mercamedia
- Release date: 2007
- Running time: 90 minutes
- Country: Mexico
- Languages: Spanish; English
- Budget: US$500,000

J-ok'el is a 2007 Mexican supernatural horror film directed by Benjamin Williams. This film was Williams' debut.

== Production ==
J-ok'el means "weeping woman" in the Tzotzil language. The film's budget was US$500,000.

== Plot ==
An American man travels to a small town in Chiapas, Mexico, called San Cristobal de las Casas, to help his mother when he knows that his stepsister has been abducted. Everything indicates that it is a wave of kidnappings attributed to the legendary J-ok'el (Weeping Woman). This woman had drowned her children a long time ago and her spirit has returned to take other children and thus forget her own suffering.

== Reception ==
The film won gold medal for best music in the Park City Film Festival in Park City, Utah.

== Soundtrack ==
Music for the film was written and conducted by George Shaw, and was released on a CD that included George Shaw-composed tracks from the 2006 independent thriller and horror film Marcus . Tracks from J-ok'el included:

1. "The Legend of La Llorona" - 2:21
2. "Journey to Mexico" - 2:32
3. "Carolina Apparition" - 0:48
4. "Nocturnal Abduction" - 1:16
5. "Missing Child" - 0:46
6. "The Weeping Woman" - 1:48
7. "Prayers for the Missing" - 3:24
8. "Scaredy Dog" - 0:16
9. "Market Chase" - 3:25
10. "Siblings Snatched" - 1:30
11. "He Left Me" - 1:42
12. "Kids in the Dark" - 1:06
13. "Flashlight Clue" - 0:57
14. "Now You Will See" - 0:43
15. "Mistaken Identity" - 1:57
16. "Fernando Taken" - 1:28
17. "It's J-ok'el" - 1:42
18. "The Search" - 4:03
19. "Cavern Confrontation" - 4:28
20. "Cemetery" - 3:19
21. "J-ok'el" - 2:57
