= Justice League vs. Teen Titans =

2016 animated film directed by Sam Liu

- Promotional poster
- Directed by: Sam Liu
- Screenplay by: Bryan Q. Miller; Alan Burnett
- Story by: Bryan Q. Miller
- Produced by: James Tucker
- Starring: Taissa Farmiga; Jon Bernthal; Stuart Allan; Jason O'Mara
- Edited by: Christopher D. Lozinski
- Music by: Frederik Wiedmann
- Production companies: Warner Bros. Animation; DC Entertainment; MOI Animation (animation services)
- Distributed by: Warner Home Video
- Release dates: March 26, 2016 (WonderCon); March 29, 2016 (United States)
- Running time: 79 minutes
- Country: United States
- Language: English

Justice League vs. Teen Titans is a 2016 American animated superhero film directed by Sam Liu from a screenplay by Alan Burnett and Bryan Q. Miller. It is the 26th film of the DC Universe Animated Original Movies and the seventh film in the DC Animated Movie Universe. The film features the voices of Taissa Farmiga, Jon Bernthal, Stuart Allan and Jason O'Mara.

The film had its world premiere at WonderCon on March 26, 2016, and was released through digital download on March 29, followed by home media release on April 12 by Warner Home Video.

== Plot ==
Years ago, the demon Trigon conceives his daughter Raven with the human Arella. When Arella discovered his demonic nature, she ran away and was taken in by the mystical inhabitants of Azarath. As a young girl, Raven becomes curious about her father. She attempted to use her powers to learn more about him. Trigon finds her and kills Arella along with the people of Azarath. Raven barely manages to seal Trigon inside a magical crystal in what was left of Azarath. Sometime later, she met and joined the Teen Titans.

In the present-day on Earth, Trigon sends a demonic corruptor to Earth, which briefly possesses Weather Wizard, following a battle between the Justice League and Legion of Doom. Ignoring his father Batman's instructions beforehand, Damian Wayne helps defeat the entity, but left the League with no background information from it.

As a consequence for his reckless actions, Nightwing takes Damian to join the Titans. He meets Starfire, their leader; Jaime Reyes, a teenager infused with technology that turns into a beetle-like exoskeleton; Garfield Logan, a metahuman with the ability to shapeshift into any animal; and Raven. At first, Damian does not get along with them, believing he can be a better leader. When he almost dies in an altercation with Jaime, Raven uses her power to heal him. They inadvertently bond through this experience - Raven sees flashes of Damian's life and he sees Trigon within her.

Meanwhile, Batman and Cyborg investigate the earlier attack. Superman is later possessed by one of the entities and brutally damages Atomic Skull, grabbing the attention of Diana and Batman. Before calming him down with kryptonite, Batman learns the entity was after the "girl", but Superman escapes before the kryptonite can disable him. Batman requests Cyborg to help him in tracking the girl in question. Elsewhere, the demonic Superman raises a gate somewhere in the desert.

Starfire takes the Titans to a carnival in order for them to try to get along. Unbeknownst to the Titans, Raven is called by Trigon's entities, who attack Raven. She fights them off with aid from the Titans. After the attack, Raven explains her backstory to the Titans. When they return to the Tower, the Justice League attempts to take Raven with them. Flash, Diana, and Cyborg are possessed by the entities; Batman avoids possession by knocking himself out with a nerve toxin designed to take down Bane. After the League beats the Titans senseless, Raven agrees to go with them to save their lives, but as they teleport away, Jaime knocks Cyborg out and frees him from possession. Raven takes the rest to Superman and summons Trigon to Earth. Cyborg awakens and uses his Apokoliptian technology to teleport them to Superman. Damian stabs Superman with Kryptonite, releasing him from his possession, who then heads to release the entity from Flash and Diana.

The League stays behind on Earth to battle Trigon while Cyborg joins the Titans in a venture to Hell to save Raven. Robin confronts and defeats a demon in the form of his deceased grandfather Ra's al Ghul. (Note: Following his death from the 2014 film Son of Batman.) Raven crafts a spell to re-imprison her father in the crystal, which she affixes to her forehead. Robin then persuades a reluctant Raven to stay on Earth with the Titans. In a mid-credits scene, a mysterious costumed girl (Note: Identified offscreen as Terra, marking continuity to Teen Titans: The Judas Contract.) riding a flying chunk of rock is seen heading towards the Titans Tower.

== Voice cast ==
Voice actor	Character
Justice League
Jason O'Mara	Bruce Wayne / Batman
Jerry O'Connell	Kal-El / Clark Kent / Superman
Rosario Dawson	Diana Prince / Wonder Woman
Christopher Gorham	Barry Allen / Flash
Shemar Moore	Victor Stone / Cyborg
Teen Titans
Stuart Allan	Damian Wayne / Robin
Sean Maher	Dick Grayson / Nightwing
Kari Wahlgren	Koriand'r / Starfire
Taissa Farmiga	Rachel Roth / Raven
Brandon Soo Hoo	Garfield Logan / Beast Boy
Jake T. Austin	Jaime Reyes / Blue Beetle
Villains
Jon Bernthal	Trigon
Steve Blum	Lex Luthor Toymaster
Terrence C. Carson	Ra's al Ghul
Rick D. Wasserman	Weather Wizard Solomon Grundy Atomic Skull
Other
Laura Bailey	Angela Chen

== Production ==
Justice League vs. Teen Titans was announced by DC Comics, along with Batman: Bad Blood, in July 2015 during San Diego Comic-Con. The voice cast includes Jon Bernthal, Taissa Farmiga, Jake T. Austin, and Brandon Soo Hoo, and returning cast members Rosario Dawson, Jerry O'Connell, Jason O'Mara, and Christopher Gorham. Frederik Wiedmann composed the film's score.

== Distribution ==
The first official image from the film was released, as well as an image of Jon Bernthal recording voiceover for the film. A sneak preview of the film was released as a bonus feature on Batman: Bad Blood. The sneak preview of the film was later released online along with the film's official trailer.

Justice League vs. Teen Titans had its world premiere at the Los Angeles WonderCon on March 26, 2016. The film was released via digital download on March 29, and straight-to-DVD and Blu-ray on April 12. A gift set of the film was released with an exclusive Robin figurine. It was released straight-to-DVD on May 30 in the United Kingdom.

== Sequel ==
An adaptation of The Judas Contract was planned as the third DC Universe Animated Original Movie, to be released after Superman: Doomsday (2007) and Justice League: The New Frontier (2008). The project was announced in 2006 but later put on hold. This film was to be based on "The Judas Contract" story from 1984 featured in Tales of the Teen Titans #42–44 and Teen Titans Annual #3 by Marv Wolfman and George Pérez. Warner Bros. Animation's writer/producer Bruce Timm confirmed in April 2010 that there were no current plans to revive the project, but in July 2016, Warner Bros. revived the project as Teen Titans: The Judas Contract and was repurposed as a sequel to Justice League vs. Teen Titans. Farmiga, Austin, Wahlgren, Soo Hoo, Allan and Maher reprised their roles, and Christina Ricci and Miguel Ferrer were announced to have joined the cast as Terra and Deathstroke respectively. The film was released on April 4, 2017, and is the final film role of Ferrer, who died on January 19.

== Reception ==
=== Critical reception ===
The review aggregator Rotten Tomatoes reported an approval rating of 80%, with an average score of 6.6/10, based on 5 reviews. Brian Lowry of Variety gave the film a mixed review, calling it inferior to other entries of the franchise. Eric Diaz of Nerdist awarded the film a rating of 3.5/5: "The movie is mostly entertaining with some pretty fun action beats. It captures the essence of the Titans, shown mostly as they were portrayed in the animated show, but with a slightly more grown-up feel".

=== Sales ===
Justice League vs. Teen Titans has earned $4,585,929 from domestic home video sales.
