= Amelia Jae =

Australian singer (born 1983)

- Born: 29 July 1983 (age 43)
- Occupations: Pop singer-songwriter and musician

Amelia Jae Nina McMurray (born 29 July 1983) is an Australian pop singer-songwriter and musician.

In 2011, Amelia launched her critically acclaimed debut album, No Ordinary Day to a sold out capacity audience of over 500 people. In the same year, she officially introduced herself to the entertainment world through Foxtel's Entertainment News Reporter, Georgia Hawkins. In July 2011, Amelia supported United States' YouTube phenomenon David Choi in his Australia leg of his APAC tour.

== Early life ==
Amelia Jae was born and raised in Kurrajong on the western, mountainous outskirts of Sydney, NSW Australia. She is the daughter of Judy McMurray and Steve McMurray and is the third of four children, having two older brothers and one younger sister. From the age of 7, Amelia started taking dance lessons. She started singing at the age of 12 when her teacher decided to put on a school musical.

Some of Amelia's musical influences include Tina Arena, Taylor Swift, Kelly Clarkson, and Rob Thomas

== Education & Training ==
Amelia Jae studied drama at local drama schools throughout her schooling at St Paul's Grammar School and Colo High. In 1999 she was accepted to the prestigious McDonald College of Performing Arts to continue her performing education, where she was coached by singing teacher Megan Shorey.

At 15 years of age she made the conscious effort to move to a NSW state school, Colo High School, where she auditioned for the NSW Schools Spectacular' and spent 3 years in this program before graduating from the prestigious Talent Development Project. During this time, Amelia was introduced to Opera singer and teacher extraordinaire Jonathon Welch, who was also the founder of The Choir of Hard Knocks and went on to study full-time for a year at Australia's prestigious NIDA (National Institute of Dramatic Arts), graduating from the 'Singer Dancer Actor' course in 2004.

Amelia Jae graduated from Charles Sturt University with a Bachelor of Education (Primary).

== Music career ==
Amelia Jae first began singing and performing when she was cast to play the lead role as Joseph in her primary school's rendition of the musical Joseph and the Amazing Technicolor Dreamcoat.

Amelia Jae wrote her first song at the age of 14 and has been developing her singer/songwriting skills since graduating from the Talent Development Project. She says, 'Knowing that through my music, people will be gaining a glimpse into my soul is both scary and exciting. I knew I wasn't the only one out there to experience these feelings, these emotions and thoughts, and if in some small measurement someone could relate to my stories, then I wanted these stories to be heard'.

In February 2010, Amelia Jae was signed by Monsoon Productions. In August 2010, Amelia performed before 4000 young people at the Sydney Entertainment Centre from her debut single "'The World is Sick'" for the RICE YOUTH EVENT. Working with USA based producers Joshua Brown (Nashville, TN), Dakarai Gwitira (New York), and Australian based producer Jake Nauta, her debut album, No Ordinary Day was launched in Australia on 1 December 2010.

January 2011, Amelia Jae performed at the Glenbrook Park Australia Day Festival.

In July 2011, Amelia Jae opened for YouTube star, David Choi, for the Australia leg of his APAC tour, they performed in Australia cities, Melbourne, Sydney and Brisbane. Other supporting act included fellow Australian pop duo Jayesslee.

In 2011, Total Girl magazine ran a competition for a TG reader to meet Amelia Jae. Applicants had to write in their most extraordinary thing they have done

In Oct 2011, Amelia Jae performed at the Black Stump Music and Arts Festival at the Metro Stage and the Plunge

== Albums ==
- No Ordinary Day

== Singles ==
- Wannabe (Rock What You Got)
- Broken Promises
- Beautiful Eyes
- No Ordinary Day
- Worth The Fight
- Collide
- Rainy Day Girl
- Now's The Time
- Perfect Lullaby
- The World is Sick

== Music videos ==
- World is Sick, RICE Rally 2010
- Beautiful Eyes
- Now's the Time
