= Forever and Ever (David Choi album) =

Studio album by David Choi
- Released: (United States) (South Korea) October 25, 2011
- Genre: Pop
- Length: 42:23
- Label: (South Korea) Riwei MCN/Pony Canyon
- Producer: David Choi

Forever and Ever is the third self-produced album by singer/songwriter/producer David Choi. It was released in the US on October 25, 2011, and reached #2 in the singer/songwriter category on iTunes. The album also reached No. 13 on the Billboard Heatseekers chart.

Choi finished a USA/Canada tour in support of the album, beginning in February 2012 and ending in April 2012. He claims this album is happy with an upbeat tempo, and that the ultimate goal of his music is to "change people for the better."

The official music video for the song "Missing Piece" from the album was released on Choi's YouTube Channel on February 27, 2012, and has received over one million views. The official music video for "Lucky Guy" was produced by Wong Fu Productions and was also released on Choi's YouTube Channel on September 5, 2012.

== Track listing ==
No.	Title	Length
1.	"Can't Take This Away"	3:20
2.	"When You're Single"	3:09
3.	"This and That Is Life"	4:21
4.	"Thinking About You"	3:37
5.	"Missing Piece"	3:19
6.	"Underneath Your Love"	3:08
7.	"Out of Tune"	3:27
8.	"You Were My Friend"	3:38
9.	"Forever and Ever"	3:15
10.	"Lucky Guy"	4:19
11.	"We're Supposed to Be Happy"	4:13
12.	"Rollercoaster"	3:57
