= Agents of Secret Stuff =

2010 American film

- Release poster
- Directed by: Wesley Chan; Ted Fu; Philip Wang
- Written by: Wesley Chan; Ted Fu; Ryan Higa; Philip Wang
- Produced by: HigaTV; Wong Fu Productions
- Starring: Ryan Higa; Arden Cho; Dominic Sandoval
- Music by: George Shaw
- Production companies: HigaTV; Wong Fu Productions
- Release dates: November 23, 2010 (Premiere screening); November 24, 2010 (Internet release)
- Running time: 35 minutes
- Country: United States
- Language: English
- Budget: $25,000

Agents of Secret Stuff is a 2010 American action comedy short film created and co-directed by Wesley Chan, Ted Fu, and Philip Wang of Wong Fu Productions, and Ryan Higa. The film stars Ryan Higa, Arden Cho, and Dominic Sandoval, and also features cameos by several other YouTube users. The film had a theatrical debut in Los Angeles on November 23, 2010, and was released on YouTube on November 24. It has received over 36.9 million views on YouTube as of November 2024, and its trailer, bloopers, and behind the scenes videos have received 5.4 million, 4 million, and 2.2 million views respectively. The movie was eventually released on the iTunes Store as Agents of Secret Stuff: Secret Edition, along with the Agents of Secret Stuff Soundboard and Agents of Secret Stuff - Spy Catcher of Reasonable Effort apps.

== Plot ==
Teenager Aden (Higa) has been training as an agent with the "Agents of Secret Stuff" (A.S.S.), a secret society of spies, his whole life. To receive his "Honorary Operative License Entitlement" (H.O.L.E.), he must fulfill one more mission for A.S.S. operative Tracy. Aden is given the undercover mission to protect Taylor (Arden Cho), a high school student who, for unknown reasons, has been targeted by the opposing assassins group, the "Society Involving Not-So-Good Stuff" (S.I.N.S.).

At first Aden, under the false name Jose McDonald, has difficulty fitting in with the high school scene, and continuously attempts to protect Taylor from normal things that he perceives as threats, causing more harm than good. On the fourth time protecting Taylor, Aden eventually reveals that he is an A.S.S., and explains the backstory of the S.I.N.S. and the A.S.S. When Taylor tells him to leave, he is forced to explain his actions, and she sympathetically helps him learn how to be a normal teenager.

On the day of the school dance, Aden again tries to save Taylor's life from Melvin (D-Trix), angering Taylor. Aden leaves Taylor with Melvin, only to realize Melvin is actually the S.I.N.S. assassin, which eventually leads to a chase scene to a warehouse. At the warehouse, Melvin ties Taylor to a chair, and when Aden eventually reaches the building, Melvin reveals that Taylor is part of the A.S.S.'s plans, which eventually leads to a fight between Aden and Melvin, which tilts to Aden's favor, until Melvin resorts to attacking Aden with a mousetrap. After Aden falls to the ground, Melvin attempts to finish him off with an axe. However, Taylor is able to break free from the chair, leading to a fight between the two.

Melvin was later defeated by Taylor, but eventually leaps at Aden and Taylor, but was later attacked from behind by Tracy. Tracy eventually congratulates Aden for "bringing out Taylor's full potential". Eventually, two other A.S.S. agents arrive, consisting of Aden's step-step-brother-in-law (the person who Aden had stolen the bicycle from to chase after Melvin), and X (the A.S.S. founder), who reveals to Taylor that he is her father. X then also congratulates Aden, and awards him the H.O.L.E., making him an official A.S.S agent.

Aden then asks Taylor to go to the homecoming dance with him, but Taylor was able to beat him to it, but when the two reach the school, the dance has already ended. Aden eventually sets his watch to JR Aquino's "You and I" and asks Taylor to dance. While dancing, a bush starts making noise, startling the two. Before they go investigate, the two share a kiss, ending the movie.

== Cast ==
- Ryan Higa as Aden
- Arden Cho as Taylor
- Dominic "D-Trix" Sandoval as Melvin
- HiimRawn as Tracy
- Philip Wang as Step-Step-Bro-in-Law/guy on bike
- Aki Aleong as Agent X
- KassemG as Mr. Anderson
- Ian Hecox as Pervert
- Anthony Padilla as Bryson

== Background ==
The film's production began as self-funded project, but in a deal brokered by YouTube executive George Strompolos was optioned by Digital Artists Studios in order that they might expand beyond YouTube and into mobile, television and film platforms. Strompolos reported that the film's $25,000 was recouped through YouTube advertising revenue and through the licensing of the film for other media.

== Production ==
According to Wong Fu's website, filming took place over the span of a week with a crew that is no bigger than 10. While the executive producers of the film were members of HigaTV and Wong Fu Productions, Chris Dinh received an assisted producer credit, and members of Corridor Digital and FreddieW, and Eric Lim provided visual effects and action coordination. The soundtrack consisted of "My Time With You" by David Choi and Kina Grannis, and "By Chance (You and I)" by JRA, the score was composed by George Shaw. The soundtrack of the film featured songs from other productions by Wong Fu ("Funemployed", "These Four Walls", "Technology Ruins Romance", "Up in Da Club", "Just a Nice Guy"). Agents of Secret Stuff was filmed in California, United States, and used Galt High School and Glen A. Wilson High School as its school locations.

== Reception ==
Gigaom wrote that the production was a "slickly-produced spy comedy", that suffered from a lack of sophistication in its over-repeated use of jokes based upon the plot use of acronyms. They offered that animations within the project "played really well", and made special note of strong acting by Kassem Gharaibeh as a bitter teacher, and how Arden Cho "stands out as a performer in her own right".
