= Forge (film) =

2025 American comedy-drama film

- Theatrical release poster
- Directed by: Jing Ai Ng
- Written by: Jing Ai Ng
- Produced by: Jing Ai Ng; Liz Daering-Glass; Gabrielle Cordero; Damian Bao
- Starring: Kelly Marie Tran; Andie Ju; Brandon Soo Hoo; Edmund Donovan; Eva De Dominici; T. R. Knight; Jack Falahee; Sonya Walger
- Cinematography: Leo Purman
- Edited by: Briana Chmielewski
- Music by: Ian Chang; Marco Carrión
- Production companies: Florida Man Films; Qilinverse
- Distributed by: Utopia
- Release dates: March 9, 2025 (SXSW); May 15, 2026 (United States)
- Running time: 114 minutes
- Country: United States
- Languages: English; Spanish; Cantonese
- Box office: $56,963

Forge is a 2025 American comedy drama film, written, directed, and produced by Jing Ai Ng. It stars Kelly Marie Tran, Andie Ju, Brandon Soo Hoo, Edmund Donovan, Eva De Dominici, T. R. Knight, Jack Falahee and Sonya Walger.

It had its world premiere at the 2025 South by Southwest Film & TV Festival on March 9, 2025. It received positive reviews. Utopia acquired distribution rights and set a release date for the film of May 15, 2026.

== Premise ==
Siblings Raymond and Coco Zhang run a forgery ring. Coerced by a disgraced millionaire, they create counterfeit masterpieces for their family's collection. FBI agent Emily Lee investigates a new string of art forgeries.

== Cast ==
- Kelly Marie Tran as Emily Lee
- Andie Ju as Coco Zhang
- Brandon Soo Hoo as Raymond Zhang
- Edmund Donovan as Holden Beaumont
- Eva De Dominici as Talia
- T. R. Knight as Sandy Baker
- Jack Falahee as Harrison
- Sonya Walger as Ann Lasalle

== Production ==
The screenplay by Jing Ai Ng was previously selected for the 2021 Film Independent Screenwriting Lab. In May 2024, Kelly Marie Tran, Andie Ju, Brandon Soo Hoo, Edmund Donovan, Eva De Dominici, T. R. Knight, Jack Falahee and Sonya Walger joined the cast of the film, with Jing Ai Ng directing from a screenplay she wrote.

== Release ==
It had its world premiere at the 2025 South by Southwest Film & TV Festival on March 9, 2025. It is scheduled to be released in the United States on May 15, 2026.

== Reception ==
Stephen Saito of Variety found Forge to be an "energetic" debut of Jing Ai Ng that explores themes of identity and authenticity through the engaging story of two underdog siblings navigating the art world, despite some plot contrivances. Christian Zilko of IndieWire gave the film a B+ and viewed it as a refreshing and entertaining film that compellingly explores the complexities of ambition and identity through its passionate protagonist, Coco, who is dedicated to the art of forgery while navigating the contrasting desires of those around her.

On review aggregator website Rotten Tomatoes, the film holds an approval rating of 87% based on 15 reviews.
