= Everything Before Us =

- Official movie poster
- Directed by: Wesley Chan; Philip Wang
- Produced by: Christine Chen; Chris Dinh; Preston Clay Reed
- Starring: Aaron Yoo; Brittany Ishibashi; Brandon Soo Hoo; Victoria Park; Randall Park; Joanna Sotomura; Chris Riedell; Ki Hong Lee
- Music by: Chanda Dancy
- Production companies: National Film Board of Canada; Wong Fu Productions
- Distributed by: Vimeo
- Release dates: 23 April 2015 (Los Angeles Asian Pacific Film Festival); 4 June 2015
- Countries: United States; Canada
- Language: English

Everything Before Us is a 2015 Canadian–American romantic drama film, directed by Philip Wang and Wesley Chan and produced by Christine Chen, Chris Dinh, and Preston Clay Reed. The film marks the first feature film of Wong Fu Productions. It stars Aaron Yoo, Brittany Ishibashi, Brandon Soo Hoo, Victoria Park, Randall Park, Joanna Sotomura, Chris Riedell, and Ki Hong Lee.

The film is set in the near future, where the Department of Emotional Integrity (D.E.I.) oversees all romantic relationships by issuing publicly-accessible 'relationship score' that keep individuals accountable for their everyday choices. The film follows the stories of Ben and Sara, an older couple who must revisit their past with the D.E.I., and Seth and Haley, a younger couple entering their first registered and long-distance relationship with the D.E.I.

== Plot ==
In the near future, the Department of Emotional Integrity (D.E.I.) issues relationship scores that affect the standings of everyone in society.

Ben is denied a job at Origin, a design company, due to a low relationship score. His ex-girlfriend, Sara, meanwhile, secures a business loan for a new cafe due to her high relationship score. Ben's friend, Henry, convinces Ben to make an appointment at the D.E.I. with Sara to boost his score. At the D.E.I., Ben and Sara clash due to their conflicting recounts of their past relationship. However, they reconcile and each sign off on 50-50 responsibility. This boosts Ben's score to land the job as a designer at Origin. Meanwhile, Seth and Haley are heading to different colleges in California, with Haley going to San Francisco and Seth staying in Los Angeles. They register their long-distance relationship with the recurring D.E.I. agent, Randall.

At his new job, Ben begins a relationship with a co-worker, Anna. When Ben visits Sara's cafe's soft opening, Ben offers to paint a mural to fill an empty spot on the wall. While working on the mural late at night, Ben and Sara have a few drinks to take a break. Ben kisses Sara, who seems receptive at first, but quickly realizes the mistake and runs out. When Anna discovers the kiss, she threatens to terminate her relationship with Ben.

Though Seth constantly visits Haley at her college, their relationship begins to fall apart starting when she ditches Seth to go out with her friends. Seth also applies to transfer to the same college as Haley without consulting her, which makes her unhappy as she feels he is not allowing her to be independent and that he is holding her back from a true college experience. Later on, Seth catches her at a party thrown by a fraternity known for inappropriate sexual relationships. Their relationship worsens even further when Seth finds that Haley has been keeping potential plans to study abroad in London from him.

Two men from the D.E.I. visit Sara's cafe to investigate a fraudulent relationship with her friend Jeremy, which she used to boost her relationship score after her breakup with Ben. Sara loses her cafe as the investigation reveals the fraud and drastically lowers her relationship score. Ben also loses his job at Origin due to a bad score after breaking up with Anna.

As Seth is on his way to the airport to visit Haley, Haley breaks up with him over the phone due to his pushiness and not involving her in his decisions. Seth and Ben both visit the D.E.I. Ben urges Seth to end his relationship in a way to make his love forever. Seth terminates his relationship with Haley, unexpectedly taking 100% of the fault for the relationship termination.

Ben is audited and recorded to aid the investigation into Sara's fraudulent relationship. Randall then goes against policy and gives Sara a recording of Ben's testimony that prevented further damage to her relationship score. She listens to his honest testimony of love for her and rebuttal of the D.E.I., arguing that love and relationships are not supposed to be easy, despite the D.E.I.'s mission to make the process smooth and simple. When Sara visits what was her cafe, she finds Ben finishing the mural. Ben and Sara start over on the mural, painting a pair of sails. Seth and Haley are shown starting their new lives independent from each other, with Haley starting school in London and Seth moving to San Francisco.

In a mid-credits scene, Henry and his wife, Sandy, take out a loan for a bakery, presumably on behalf of Sara.

== Cast ==
- Aaron Yoo as Ben
- Brittany Ishibashi as Sara
- Brandon Soo Hoo as Seth
- Victoria Park as Haley
- Randall Park as Randall
- Joanna Sotomura as Anna
- Chris Riedell as Henry
- Ki Hong Lee as Jay
- Katie Savoy as Sandy
- Lia Marie Johnson as Tiff
- Stephen A. Chang as Jeremy
- Emanuel Boria as Paul
- Parvesh Cheena as Eric

== Production ==
Wong Fu Productions used the Indiegogo platform to crowdfund the money needed to produce the film. The fundraising campaign lasted one month. The original goal of $250,000 was exceeded to reach $350,000 worth of donations from over 6,500 individual donors.

== Release ==
A teaser trailer for the film was released on 9 April 2015, on Wong Fu Productions' YouTube channel. The second trailer was also released on the channel on 4 June 2015, the same day as the movie's release. Wong Fu also held a screening tour across the United States to promote the movie. Other YouTube channels such as Time and ISAtv indirectly promoted the movie by offering behind-the-scenes glimpses at the movie's production.

The premiere of Everything Before Us was held at the Los Angeles Asian Pacific Film Festival. Since the official release, a digital copy of the movie was made available on Vimeo to either buy or rent for streaming. A physical DVD bundled with the official movie poster was also made available for purchase through the movie's official website.
