= Brandon Soo Hoo =

American actor (born 1995)

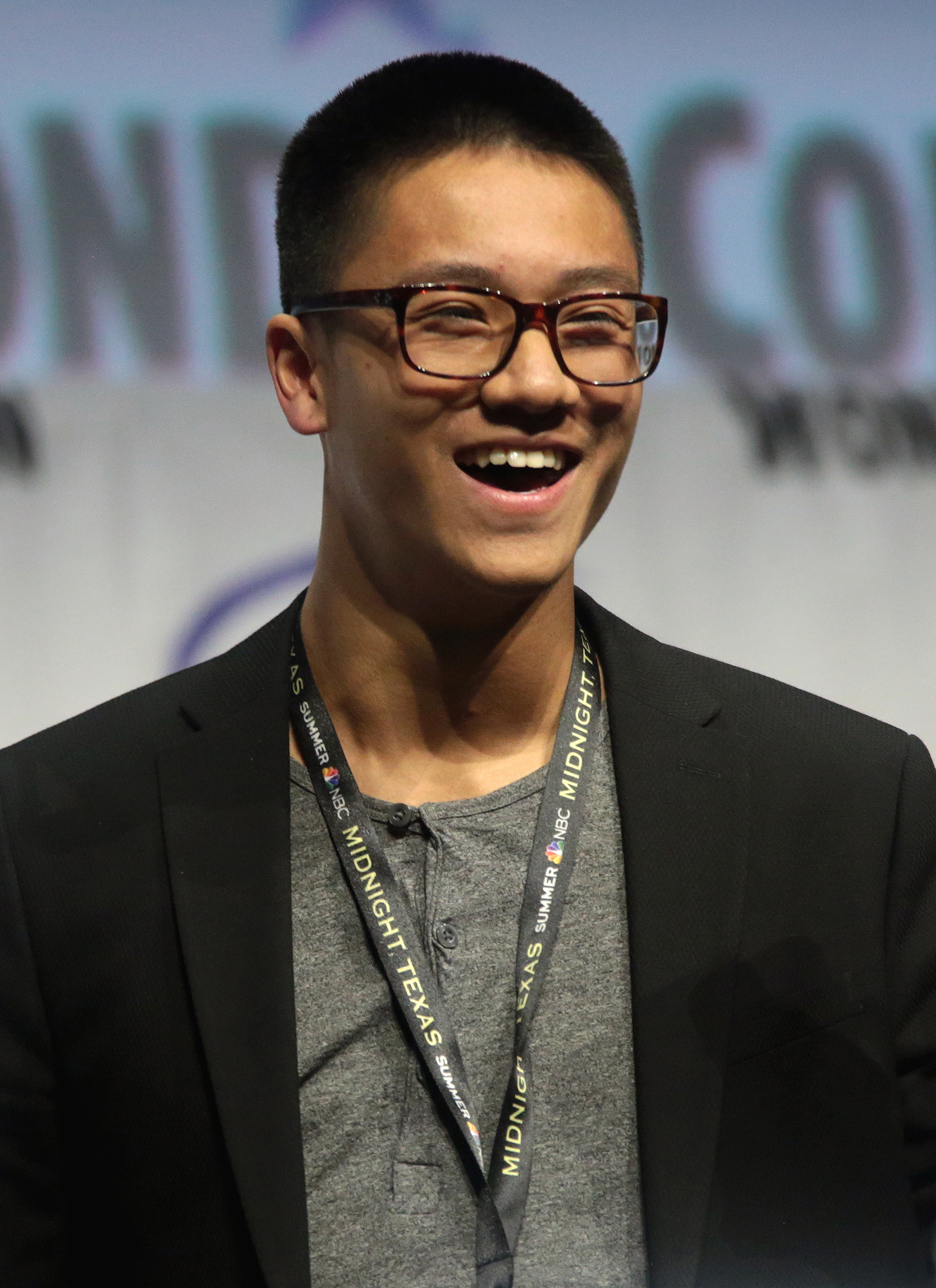
- Soo Hoo at the 2017 WonderCon
- Born: November 2, 1995 (age 30); Pasadena, California, U.S.
- Occupations: Actor, martial artist
- Years active: 2007–present

Brandon Soo Hoo (born November 2, 1995) is an American actor and martial artist. He is known for playing Tran in the 2008 film Tropic Thunder and for his series regular role on the Cartoon Network sketch comedy series Incredible Crew. Soo Hoo played Scott Fuller on the El Rey Network horror-drama series From Dusk till Dawn: The Series, based on the film of the same name.

== Early life ==
Brandon Soo Hoo was born in Pasadena, California on November 2, 1995. He is of Chinese descent.

== Career ==
Brandon began his acting career at the age of 10, when he was featured in television advertisements for Toys "R" Us, Land Rover, and ExxonMobil. In 2007, he had a minor role on Sesame Street. Soo Hoo made his feature film debut in Ben Stiller's comedy film Tropic Thunder (2008), playing the role of Tran, a young leader of the Flaming Dragon gang; he won a Young Artist Award for his performance. In 2009, he portrayed Young Storm Shadow in the action film G.I. Joe: The Rise of Cobra, and was again nominated for a Young Artist Award for his performance.

Soo Hoo guest starred on the NBC comedy series My Name is Earl and the Fox sitcom 'Til Death. In 2010, he had guest starring role on NBC's comedy series Community. Soo Hoo then had a recurring role as Connor on Nickelodeon's Supah Ninjas. In 2013, he co-starred as Fly Molo in the science fiction film Ender's Game, alongside Harrison Ford, Ben Kingsley, and Asa Butterfield. Soo Hoo was then part of the regular cast of the Cartoon Network sketch comedy series Incredible Crew, created by Nick Cannon.

From 2014 to 2016, he starred as Scott Fuller on the El Rey Network horror-drama series From Dusk till Dawn: The Series, a television adaptation of Robert Rodriguez's film of the same name. In 2015, he starred as Seth in the film Everything Before Us. In 2016, he provided the voice of Garfield Logan / Beast Boy in the DC Comics animated direct-to-video film Justice League vs. Teen Titans. In September 2018, he appeared in a Wong Fu Production video "Asian Bachelorette 2", a sequel to "Asian Bachelorette".

In 2022, Soo Hoo co-founded Staxs Grill, a burger restaurant in Cambodia. In 2023, Soo Hoo was cast to play the lead role in the Netflix animated series Mech Cadets. He voiced the protagonist in the 2024 Paramount+ animated film The Tiger's Apprentice.

In 2025, Soo Hoo co-starred in the comedy-drama film Forge, which was premiere at the 2025 South by Southwest Film & TV Festival on March 9, 2025. It is scheduled to be released on May 15, 2026.

== Personal life ==
Soo Hoo is a practitioner of multiple forms of martial arts. He is a black belt in taekwondo and has trained in kung fu (Wing Chun, Wushu and Southern Fist), Muay Thai and karate.

== Filmography ==
=== Film ===
Year	Title	Role	Notes	Ref.
2008	Tropic Thunder	Tran		
2009	G.I. Joe: The Rise of Cobra	Young Storm Shadow		
2013	Ender's Game	Fly Molo		
2015	Everything Before Us	Seth		
2016	Justice League vs. Teen Titans	Beast Boy	Voice role	
2016	Bedeviled	Dan		
2017	Teen Titans: The Judas Contract	Beast Boy	Voice role	
2021	Music	Tanner		
2021	Let Us In	Luke		
2021	The Disappearance of Mrs. Wu	Ben Wu		
2024	The Tiger's Apprentice	Tom Lee	Voice role	
2025	Forge	Raymond Zhang		

=== Television ===
Year	Title	Role	Notes
2007	Sesame Street	Bicycle Boy	Episode: "Grouch News Network!"
2008	My Name Is Earl	Dennis	Episode: "Joy in a Bubble"
2009	'Til Death	Ernie	Episode: "The Ex-Factor"
2010	Community	Abed's Chang	Episode: "Communication Studies"
2010	Everyday Kid	Mike Oh	Television film
2011–13	Supah Ninjas	Connor	Recurring role; 8 episodes
2011	Workaholics	Punk Kid	Episode: "Piss & Shit"
2012–13	Incredible Crew	Various roles	Main role; 13 episodes
2013	Instant Mom	Owen	Episode: "Not a Date"
2014	Terry the Tomboy	Napkin Rapkin	Television film
2014–2016	From Dusk till Dawn: The Series	Scott Fuller	Main role; 20 episodes
2017	Teen Wolf	Jiang	Episode: "Pressure Test"
2019–2020	PEN15	Andy Kim	2 episodes
2023–present	Mech Cadets	Stanford Yu	Lead role; Voice role
2026	Whispers	Nathan Paulson	Episode: "Influence Us"

== Awards and nominations ==
Year	Award	Category	Work	Result	Ref.
2009	Young Artist Award	Best Performance in a Feature Film - Supporting Young Actor	Tropic Thunder	Won	
2010	Young Artist Award	Best Performance in a Feature Film - Supporting Young Actor	G.I. Joe: The Rise of Cobra	Nominated	
2011	Young Artist Award	Best Performance in a TV Series - Guest Starring Young Actor 14-17	Community	Nominated	
2012	Young Artist Award	Best Performance in a TV Series - Recurring Young Actor	Supah Ninjas	Nominated	
2012	Young Artist Award	Best Performance in a TV Series - Guest Starring Young Actor 14-17	Workaholics	Nominated	
2013	Young Artist Award	Outstanding Young Ensemble in a TV Series	Incredible Crew (with Shauna Case, Shameik Moore, Tristan Pasterick, Chanelle Peloso and Jeremy Shada)	Nominated	
2013	Young Artist Award	Best Performance in a TV Series - Recurring Young Actor	Supah Ninjas	Nominated	
2014	Young Artist Award	Best Performance in a TV Series - Recurring Young Actor	Supah Ninjas	Nominated	
2015	VC FilmFest - Los Angeles Asian Pacific Film Festival	Best New Actor- Narrative Feature	Everything Before Us (with Anthony Ma for Love Arcadia)	Won	
2019	Chinese American Film Festival	Best Short Film	Our Home Here (with Summer Xinlei Yang, Angela Chen, Michal Wronski and Dianne Doan)	Nominated	
2020	Queens World Film Festival	Best Narrative Short	Our Home Here (with Summer Xinlei Yang, Angela Chen, Michal Wronski and Dianne Doan)	Nominated	
2020	Asians On Film Festival	Best Actor	Our Home Here (with Summer Xinlei Yang, Angela Chen, Michal Wronski and Dianne Doan)	Won	
