= Teen Titans: The Judas Contract =

2017 animated film directed by Sam Liu

- Promotional poster
- Directed by: Sam Liu
- Screenplay by: Ernie Altbacker
- Based on: The Judas Contract by: Marv Wolfman; and George Pérez
- Produced by: James Tucker
- Starring: Miguel Ferrer; Christina Ricci
- Edited by: Christopher D. Lozinski
- Music by: Frederik Wiedmann
- Production companies: Warner Bros. Animation; DC Entertainment; The Answer Studio (animation service)
- Distributed by: Warner Home Video
- Release dates: March 31, 2017 (WonderCon); April 4, 2017 (United States)
- Running time: 84 minutes
- Country: United States
- Language: English

Teen Titans: The Judas Contract is a 2017 American animated superhero film directed by Sam Liu from a screenplay by Ernie Altbacker based on The Judas Contract storyline by Marv Wolfman and George Pérez. It is the 29th film of the DC Universe Animated Original Movies, the ninth film of the DC Animated Movie Universe and the sequel to Justice League vs. Teen Titans (2016). The film features the voices of Miguel Ferrer and Christina Ricci as Deathstroke and Terra, respectively. It was released three months after Ferrer's death in January 2017 and is his final film role.

This film had its world premiere at WonderCon on March 31, 2017. The film was released through digital download on April 4 and through home media on April 18 by Warner Home Video.

Additionally, Crispin Freeman, Jason Spisak and Masasa Moyo reprise their respective roles from Young Justice as Roy Harper / Speedy, Kid Flash, and Karen Beecher / Bumblebee.

== Plot ==
Five years ago, the original Teen Titans—Dick Grayson as Robin, Speedy, Kid Flash, Beast Boy, and Bumblebee—rescue Starfire from captors sent by her evil older sister Blackfire. As she is no longer able to return to her home planet of Tamaran, the Titans offer her a home on Earth as one of them. Dick falls in love with Starfire at first sight, which intensifies when she kisses him to learn English.

In the present, Dick Grayson - now known as Nightwing - rejoins the Teen Titans to track down a terrorist cult led by Brother Blood, who plans on capturing the team to absorb each of their unique abilities with a machine that he has tested on Jericho; the latter is later shot in the head by Blood's lover and assistant, Mother Mayhem. To speed up the progress with his development, Blood hires the mercenary Deathstroke to deliver the Titans to him; Deathstroke, who survived his apparent death a few years ago, (Note: As depicted in the 2014 film Son of Batman.) still seeks revenge on Damian Wayne - the new Robin - for replacing him as Ra's al Ghul's heir before betraying the League of Assassins. Deathstroke monitors the Titans through his double agent Terra, who joined the team a year prior (Note: As depicted in the 2016 film Justice League vs. Teen Titans.) and whom he rescued after her parents turned their whole village against her and tortured her. When Damian grows suspicious of Terra's behavior and starts tracking her, he is confronted by Deathstroke; they fight until Terra subdues and captures Damian, thus revealing her affiliation to Deathstroke.

Terra initially acts cold and distant towards the other Titans despite their welcoming attitude, but eventually warms up to them. During the night celebrating her one-year anniversary with the Titans, she shares a tender moment with Beast Boy and kisses him; they gradually enter into a relationship. While attending a convention to do a podcast with Kevin Smith, Beast Boy is captured by Deathstroke; Blue Beetle is snatched from the soup kitchen where he works; and Starfire is kidnapped at the apartment she shares with Nightwing. Meanwhile, Terra captures Raven at the Titan's headquarters. Nightwing soon learns about the conspiracy before Deathstroke ambushes him. Outmatched, he manages to escape by faking his own death.

Terra reveals herself as a double agent to the captured Titans when she and Deathstroke bring them to Brother Blood, who intends to become a god-like figure by using the machine to absorb the Titans' powers. However, since Deathstroke had failed to capture Nightwing, the machine cannot operate properly without a sixth Titan; in response, he betrays Terra by allowing Blood to apprehend her - thus completing the deal between them. With his followers and Deathstroke present, Blood proceeds to commence draining the Titans of their powers until Nightwing surprisingly intervenes. After rescuing the Titans, Nightwing and Robin fight Deathstroke while the others battle Blood, who has absorbed all of their powers. The Titans struggle against the villains until Terra intervenes, furiously attacking Deathstroke for his betrayal and overpowering Blood. The battle ends with Blood being depowered by Raven unleashing her inner fury as a demon while Deathstroke is buried underneath multiple rocks thrown by Terra. Blood is then shot and killed by Mother Mayhem to prevent him from being captured by the Titans. Too ashamed to face her former allies after betraying their trust, Terra decides to bring down the entire area. Beast Boy attempts to assist Terra in escaping the crumbling fortress, but Terra pushes him back and is buried underneath multiple layers of rubble. Beast Boy digs her up, and she dies in his arms.

In the epilogue, Beast Boy goes on Kevin Smith's podcast and talks about the Titans with him. He mentions that the team has a "wonderful new member" and that he will always miss Terra.

In a post-credits scene, Jericho is shown to have survived the bullet Mother Mayhem shot at him earlier.

== Voice cast ==
Voice actor	Character
New Teen Titans
Stuart Allan	Damian Wayne / Robin
Taissa Farmiga	Rachel Roth / Raven
Brandon Soo Hoo	Garfield Logan / Beast Boy
Jake T. Austin	Jaime Reyes / Blue Beetle
Christina Ricci	Tara Markov / Terra
Original Titans
Sean Maher	Dick Grayson / Robin / Nightwing
Kari Wahlgren	Koriand'r / Starfire
Masasa Moyo	Karen Beecher / Bumblebee^{a} Traci
Jason Spisak	Kid Flash^{a}
Crispin Freeman	Roy Harper / Speedy / Arsenal^{a}
Villains
Miguel Ferrer	Slade Wilson / Deathstroke
Gregg Henry	Sebastian Blood / Brother Blood
Meg Foster	Mother Mayhem
Other
Maria Canals-Barrera	Bianca Reyes
Kevin Smith	Himself
David Zayas	Alberto Reyes
Kari Wahlgren	Milagro Reyes

^a The actor/actress's voice role is reprised from Young Justice.

== Production ==
An adaptation of The Judas Contract was planned as the third in the DC Universe Animated Original Movies series, to be released after Superman: Doomsday (2007) and Justice League: The New Frontier (2008), but this was later shelved. It was to be based on 1984's "The Judas Contract" story featured in Tales of the Teen Titans #42–44, and Teen Titans Annual #3 by Marv Wolfman and George Pérez. Warner Bros. Animation's writer/producer Bruce Timm confirmed in April 2010 that there were no current plans to revive the project, but in July 2016, Warner Bros. revived the project as Teen Titans: The Judas Contract, serving as a sequel to Justice League vs. Teen Titans. Farmiga, Austin, Wahlgren, Soo Hoo, Allan and Maher reprised their roles, and Christina Ricci and Miguel Ferrer joined the cast as Terra and Deathstroke, respectively. This was the final project for Ferrer before he died from throat cancer in January 2017.

== Distribution ==
=== Marketing ===
The first promotional images from the film were released by The Hollywood Reporter in January 2017. In early February, a trailer and exclusive clip were released.

=== Release ===
The film had its world premiere at the Los Angeles WonderCon on March 31, 2017. Teen Titans: The Judas Contract was then released via digital download on April 4, and was released straight-to-DVD and Blu-ray on April 18.

== Reception ==
The review aggregator Rotten Tomatoes reported an approval rating of 83%, with an average score of 7.6/10, based on 6 reviews.

Jesse Schedeen of IGN gave the film a 6.2/10 rating: "The film loses too much of what makes the source material memorable, while the limited run-time prevents the writers from fully taking advantage of the team dynamic or properly fleshing out the villains". Julian Roman of MovieWeb called the film a "marked improvement" over Justice League vs. Teen Titans and wrote: "The film slickly integrates adult themes into its entertaining plotline. The Judas Contract is action packed and moves at a fast pace. The Teen Titans are certainly on better footing here".

Teen Titans: The Judas Contract earned $3,258,824 from domestic home video sales.
