= Versamat =

Trade Name

Versamat is a Kodak trade name for their automated film processing units, for both with versions for black and white as well as color-capable.

First and foremost, Versamats were designed for short roll/single photo developing. Many places, however, have used it for long roll film; it can handle film up to approx. 12 inches wide. With long rolls, however, there are a lot of problems because the film passes over many rollers. Most long roll film processors, on the other hand, use one roller at the top and bottom of each tank, which means that the film contacts only a few of them for the entire run.

The Versamat has multiple uses and possible processing styles.

For instance, the Versamat 1140 has 7 tanks, each with a full rack in it. The film goes in the supply side, and follows the racks up and down through the tanks to be processed.

Most Versamats use developer, followed by a stop bath, fix, water wash, and finally conditioner. Some variations don't require the stop bath.

The Versamat also has control over the height of the liquid/chemical, as well as speed of the film, to determine how long it is in each solution. Usual speeds are 25-35 fpm, with a developer temp of 90 F–95 F and a drybox temp of 128–135 F

Put simply, the developer converts the latent image to a visible one, fix stops the development, water washes off the fix, and conditioner helps to restore the hardness of the emulsion.

Finally, the film goes through the dry box to remove volatile chemicals and to dry it. As well, there are static removers at the exit end of the dry box.
