= Randall Park =

American actor and comedian (born 1974)

- Park in 2026
- Born: March 23, 1974 (age 52); Los Angeles, California, U.S.
- Education: University of California, Los Angeles (BA, MA)
- Occupations: Actor; director; screenwriter; producer; comedian
- Years active: 2003–present
- Spouse: Jae Suh Park (m. 2008)
- Children: 1

Randall Park (born March 23, 1974) is an American actor, filmmaker, and comedian. He is best known for his roles as Agent Jimmy Woo in the Marvel Cinematic Universe, FBI Special Agent Edwin Park in the Netflix series The Residence (2025), Louis Huang in the ABC sitcom Fresh Off the Boat (2015–2020), for which he was nominated for the Critics' Choice Television Award for Best Actor in a Comedy Series in 2016, and for IKEA Heights, a comedy web series.

Before these major roles, Park gained popularity by playing Steve, a prank replacement of Jim Halpert (dubbed "Asian Jim") in an episode of the NBC sitcom The Office, and starring in the recurring role of Governor Danny Chung in the HBO comedy series Veep. He also co-starred in and co-wrote the Netflix romantic comedy film Always Be My Maybe (2019) alongside Ali Wong and directed the comedy-drama film Shortcomings (2023).

Park played Agent Jimmy Woo in the Marvel Cinematic Universe, including the films Ant-Man and the Wasp (2018) and Ant-Man and the Wasp: Quantumania, (2023) and the miniseries WandaVision (2021). He played a future version of himself in the 2021 Dwayne Johnson autobiographical comedy series Young Rock and portrayed North Korean dictator Kim Jong Un in the comedy film The Interview (2014). He played Dr. Stephen Shin in the DC Extended Universe films Aquaman (2018) and Aquaman and the Lost Kingdom (2023).

In 2019, Park launched a production company called Imminent Collision.

== Early life ==
Park was born to Duk Hee and Harry Park, Korean immigrants in Los Angeles, California and grew up in the Los Angeles neighborhood of Castle Heights. His mother was an accountant at the University of California, Los Angeles (UCLA) and his father owned a one-hour photo store. Park graduated from Hamilton High School's humanities magnet program.

Park attended University of California, Los Angeles (UCLA) in the fall quarter of 1993. There he co-founded "Lapu, the Coyote that Cares," the largest and longest-running on-campus Asian American theater company, now known as the LCC Theatre Company, in 1995. He credits his experiences with LCC for sparking his desire to pursue acting professionally and would go on to collaborate with many of its alumni. Their first performance was Treehouse Bachelor Society, a full-length play written by Park, at the Northwest Auditorium. Park was a student volunteer for UCLA's official charity, UCLA UniCamp, and went by the camp name "CareMoose". He graduated with a bachelor's degree in English, with a concentration in creative writing, and a minor in Asian American studies in 1997. He remained at UCLA, partly to continue acting with LCC, and later completed his master's degree in Asian American studies in 1999. After graduation, Park worked at the weekly newspaper New Times LA as a graphic/print designer for a few years. When he left the job, he considered architecture school but failed the prerequisite courses, realizing he did not want to attend any more schools.

== Career ==
=== 2001–2006: Early years ===
Park co-founded the Propergander theater group with a few LCC alumni. Their first production was The Achievers by LCC co-founder Michael Golamco in 2001. Around this time, Park began doing stand-up comedy recreationally in his backyard during Propergander shows. He cited Mike Birbiglia and Mitch Hedberg as early influences and would later perform alongside comedian Ali Wong. Other notable Propergander alumni include Vivian Bang, Tim Chiou, and Eddie Shin. Park, Shin, Wong, and LCC co-founder Naoya Imanishi were also a part of the short-lived improv group, "The Legendary Stage Ninjaz".

Park made his screen debut as the lead in the 2003 short film Dragon of Love. It won Best Short Film at the 2003 Hawaii International Film Festival.

Park co-wrote and starred in the feature film American Fusion, directed by UCLA alumnus Frank Lin, which won the Audience Award at the 2005 Hawaii International Film Festival. It was also Pat Morita's last film before his death in November of that year. The script was a quarter-finalist for the 2009 Nicholl Fellowships in Screenwriting.

Early in his career when Park did not have a talent agent, he would book roles through diversity showcases at different television networks. In 2006 he appeared in the CBS Diversity Showcase. At 32, while a cast member on MTV's Wild 'n Out, he worked at Starbucks to supplement his income.

In 2007 he regularly appeared as an actor in the filmmaking reality show On the Lot.

=== 2007–2013: Online work ===
Park found work to be scarce after 2008's Great Recession in the United States and a potential SAG-AFTRA strike at the beginning of 2009, so he began to focus on his own projects during this period. He wrote the short film Blueberry, which won an award for Best Actor at the NBC Shortcuts Film Festival For Short Films in 2010.

He had a recurring role as Martin Fukanaga on Supah Ninjas.

Park has collaborated on several projects with Wong Fu Productions, beginning with his role as Brandon in the comedy skit Too Fast (2010) and as the stepfather in the web series Home Is Where the Hans Are (2012). Later Park appeared as a D.E.I. (Department of Emotional Integrity) agent in the feature film Everything Before Us (2015) and its accompanying short film, as Asian Santa in the comedy skit Why is Santa Asian?, and as himself in a brief cameo in Asian Bachelorette 2.

He created, directed, wrote, and starred in several short internet series for Channel 101, including Dr. Miracles, The Food, IKEA Heights, and Dumb Professor. In 2013 he wrote and starred in another Channel 101 series featuring his baby daughter, entitled Baby Mentalist. In Channel 101's bracket competition format for web-series, Baby Mentalist was voted number one the most times out of all the channel's shows, and it ended with six episodes in 2013.

=== 2014–present: Mainstream success ===
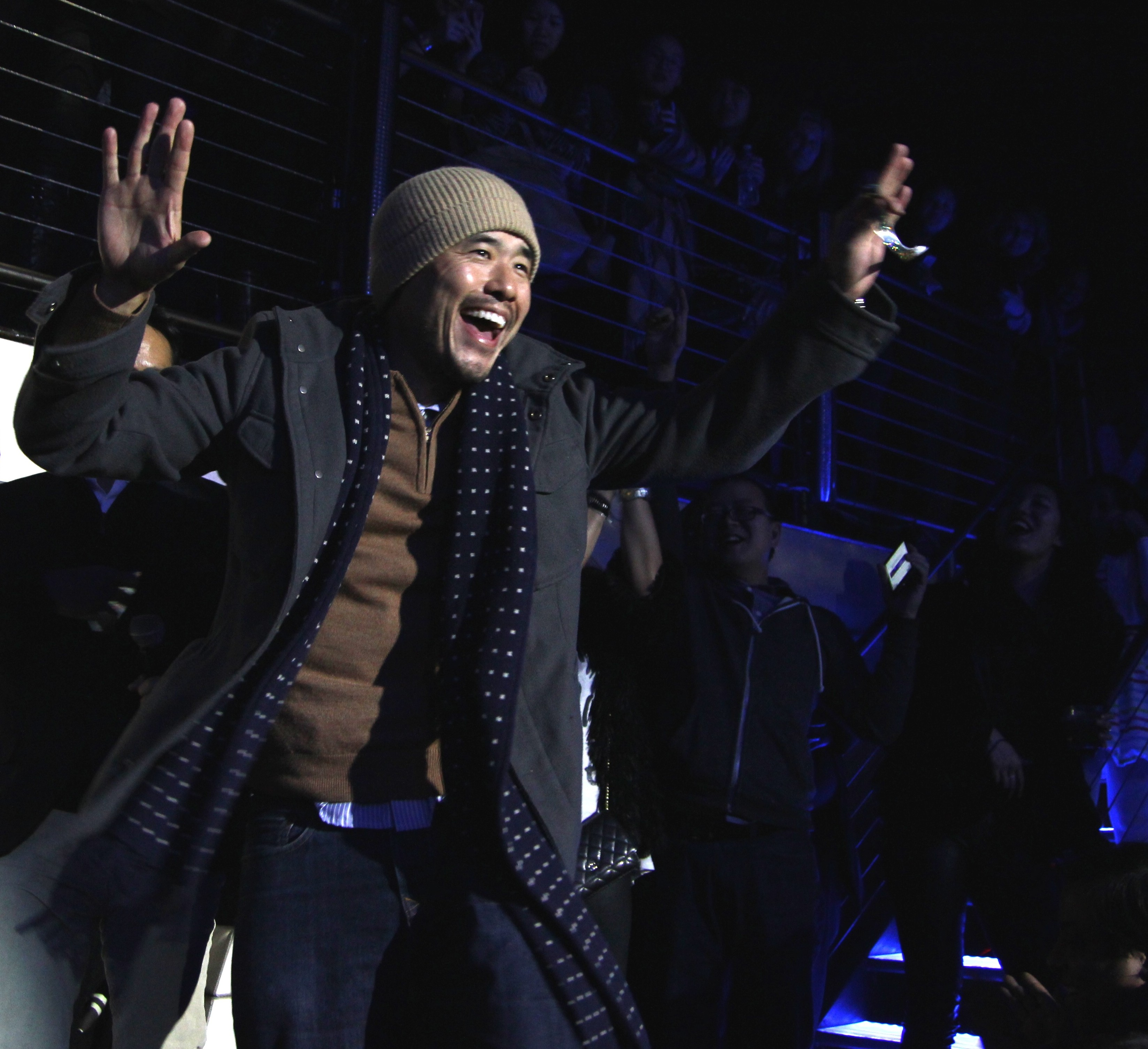
Park at The #FreshOffTheBoat Viewing Party at The Circle NYC on February 4, 2015

Park played the recurring character of Minnesota governor Danny Chung on the HBO comedy Veep.

In 2014 Park played a company rep trying to recruit college students in Neighbors. He had previously worked with the director, Nicholas Stoller, on The Five-Year Engagement (2012). Stoller later recommended Park for the role of "a vague North Korean dictator", who later turned out to be North Korean leader Kim Jong-un, in the controversial film, The Interview, directed by Evan Goldberg and Seth Rogen. Impressed by his performance, Goldberg and Rogen offered Park the part just after one audition. As reference material, he looked to Forest Whitaker's performance in The Last King of Scotland and to the Vice documentary on North Korea. Park also gained over 20 pounds for the role.

That same year, Park appeared in the comedy film, Sex Tape.

In 2015 he appeared as Jeff in Netflix's prequel series, Wet Hot American Summer: First Day of Camp and worked on Wong Fu Productions' first feature film, Everything Before Us. Park starred with John Malkovich in the music video for Eminem's single "Phenomenal". He then played a co-worker of Amy Schumer's character in Trainwreck and also had roles in the films, Southpaw (as Jed Wang) and The Night Before as Ethan's Boss.

From 2015 to 2020 Park starred as Louis Huang, patriarch of a Taiwanese American family, alongside Constance Wu in ABC's television show Fresh Off the Boat (based on Eddie Huang's memoir, Fresh Off the Boat: A Memoir), written and produced by Nahnatchka Khan and executive produced by Jake Kasdan. He was the first actor cast on the show, the producers having approached him before the pilot was ordered. Being of Korean heritage, Park initially felt uneasy about portraying a Taiwanese father. However, Huang reassured Park that he was his first choice to play his father. When they were staffing the writer's room, Park recommended Ali Wong for a position. The show ran for six seasons and concluded on February 21, 2020.

In 2016 Park appeared in the film Office Christmas Party as Fred.

In 2017 Park appeared in the comedies, The House as the Wall Street Guy and The Disaster Artist. He also lent his voice talents to the computer-animated film The Lego Ninjago Movie as Chen the Cheerleader.

In 2018 Park had minor roles in both the Marvel Cinematic Universe and DC Extended Universe (DCEU). He played FBI Agent Jimmy Woo in the Marvel Studios film Ant-Man and the Wasp, returning as Woo in the Disney+ series, WandaVision (2021). In the DCEU, he played Dr. Stephen Shin in the film Aquaman.

Park produced and starred in the Netflix original film Always Be My Maybe, directed by Fresh Off the Boat creator Nahnatchka Khan, with Ali Wong. The film was written by Park, Wong, and Michael Golamco. The in-film hip-hop band, Hello Peril, is inspired by Park's '90s hip-hop band, Ill Again. The film was released in select theaters on May 29, 2019, and digitally on Netflix on May 31, 2019.

Park, Golamco, and Hieu Ho launched the Asian American-focused production company, Imminent Collision, and signed a first-look deal with 20th Century Fox Television in October 2019. The name is derived from a play they worked on while they were members of the LCC theater group at UCLA.

In 2022 Park starred in the Netflix comedy series Blockbuster, which aired for one season before being cancelled.

In January 2023, Park's directorial debut, Shortcomings, premiered at the 2023 Sundance Film Festival. The film was released on August 4, 2023, by Sony Pictures Classics.

In November 2024, Park finished the New York City Marathon with a time of 4 hours 16 minutes and 18 seconds.

In March 2025, Park starred in the Netflix miniseries, The Residence, as FBI Special Agent Edwin Park. He has also recurred in the CBS Sherlock Holmes-based series Watson playing arch criminal Moriarty.

== Other works ==
Park was a front man for the Los Angeles-based hip-hop/jazz/rock fusion band, Ill Again. The band served as the inspiration for his character's band, Hello Peril, in the film Always Be My Maybe (2019). He later formed the rap group Novelists with former Ill Again emcee Andrew Johnson. In this group, Park went by the rap name, "Randruff." They released the album Bookends in 2008.

In 2019 Park, rapped alongside Wayne Brady, Rafael Casal, Utkarsh Ambudkar, and Daveed Diggs in "Housewarming Cypher".

In 2020 Park voiced Eugene in the Cartoon Network show, Mao Mao: Heroes of Pure Heart, in the episode "Adoradad".

In 2022 Park was featured in rapper Lyrics Born's song "This Song's Delicious" alongside Dan the Automator. In the music video, Park went by the name "Sitcom Dad."

Park has been featured in ads for HBO Go, Ally Financial, and the 2011 Father's Day Verizon Droid commercial. He appeared as a "doggie daycare owner" in a print and online campaign for Chase Bank, which aired in early 2015.

Park was featured in UTC Business Ethics Course HUR750 "Respect in the Workplace".

== Personal life ==
Park is married to actress Jae Suh Park. They worked together on The Mindy Project and the short film Love, NY. They live with their daughter Ruby in the San Fernando Valley. Ruby Louise Park was born in 2012. She starred alongside her parents as a crime-fighting baby superhero in Baby Mentalist, a comedy web series developed by her father in 2013. Ruby is autistic, as discussed by Park on Mike Birbiglia's podcast Working it Out. Park supports the non-profit KultureCity that focuses on "sensory accessibility and acceptance for those with invisible disabilities." Park is also on KultureCity's board of directors.

Park returned to UCLA as a keynote speaker for the Asian American Studies department commencement ceremony in 2015 and for the English department commencement ceremony in 2017.

Park delivered the keynote address at all three UCLA college commencement ceremonies in 2023.

Park is an active supporter of the East West Players theater group in Little Tokyo, Los Angeles. He publicly voiced his support for the theatre during EWP's donation campaign in 2018.

Park has an older brother. In the beginning, Park's parents were not supportive of his acting ambitions. However, in hindsight Park has acknowledged that they supported him tacitly at the time by continuing to house him throughout the years. When Park received the script for The Interview, his parents encouraged him to pursue the role.

== Filmography ==
=== Film ===
Key
| † | Denotes works that have not yet been released |

| Year | Title | Role | Notes |
|---|---|---|---|
| 2005 | Will Unplugged | Kevin | |
| 2005 | American Fusion | Josh | |
| 2007 | Universal Remote | The Sick Man / Asian Father | |
| 2008 | Fix | Sam | |
| 2009 | The People I've Slept With | Carlton Kim | |
| 2009 | Winged Creatures | Resident | |
| 2010 | Dinner for Schmucks | Henderson | |
| 2010 | The 41-Year-Old Virgin Who Knocked Up Sarah Marshall and Felt Superbad About It | Officer Yo Ass | |
| 2011 | Larry Crowne | Trainee Wong | |
| 2011 | Our Footloose Remake | Ren McCormack | |
| 2011 | The Good Doctor | Clerk | |
| 2012 | The Five Year Engagement | Ming | |
| 2014 | Sex Tape | Edward | |
| 2014 | They Came Together | Martinson | |
| 2014 | The Interview | Kim Jong Un | |
| 2015 | Trainwreck | Bryson | |
| 2015 | The Meddler | Officer Lee | |
| 2015 | Everything Before Us | Randall | |
| 2015 | The Night Before | Ethan's Boss | |
| 2015 | Amigo Undead | Kevin Ostrowski | |
| 2016 | The Hollars | Dr. Fong | |
| 2016 | Office Christmas Party | Fred | |
| 2017 | The Disaster Artist | Rob | |
| 2017 | Snatched | Michael | |
| 2017 | The 60 Yard Line | Trapper | |
| 2017 | The House | Buckler | |
| 2017 | The Lego Ninjago Movie | Chen the Cheerleader | Voice |
| 2017 | Dismissed | Mr. Sheldon | |
| 2018 | The Samurai of Tsushima | Ganpei | Voice |
| 2018 | Ant-Man and the Wasp | Jimmy Woo | |
| 2018 | Aquaman | Stephen Shin | |
| 2019 | Long Shot | Boss | |
| 2019 | Always Be My Maybe | Marcus Kim | Also writer, producer |
| 2019 | Straight Up | Wallace | |
| 2020 | Valley Girl | Principal Evans | |
| 2021 | Paw Patrol: The Movie | Butch | Voice |
| 2022 | The People We Hate at the Wedding | Russell | |
| 2023 | Shortcomings | Ji-Hun | Also director; Feature directorial debut |
| 2023 | Ant-Man and the Wasp: Quantumania | Jimmy Woo | Cameo |
| 2023 | Strays | Hunter | Voice |
| 2023 | Totally Killer | Sheriff Dennis Lim | |
| 2023 | Aquaman and the Lost Kingdom | Dr. Stephen Shin | |
| 2024 | Shell | Randolph Chan | |
| 2025 | Night Always Comes | Scott | |
| 2025 | Eenie Meanie | Leo | |
| 2025 | A Very Jonas Christmas Movie | Brad | |
| 2026 | Wishful Thinking | Bobby | |
| 2026 | Brian | | |
| 2026 | Hexed † | TBA | Voice |
| 2027 | Return to You † | Trey | Post-production |
| TBA | Better Life † | | Post-production |
| TBA | Girl Group † | | Filming |
| TBA | Soapbox † | | Filming |

=== Television ===
Key
| † | Denotes television productions that have not yet been released |

| Year | Title | Role | Notes |
|---|---|---|---|
| 2003 | Fastlane | Octopus Man | Episode: "Strap On" |
| 2003 | Reno 911! | Mailman | Episode: "Dangle's Moving Day" |
| 2003 | Las Vegas | Jasper | Episode: "Jokers and Fools" |
| 2004 | Alias | Korean Soldier | Episode: "Crossings" |
| 2004 | ER | Yong-Jo Pak | Episode: "White Guy, Dark Hair" |
| 2005 | House | Brad | Episode: "Autopsy" |
| 2006 | Four Kings | Server Pat | Episode: "Night of the Iguana" |
| 2006–07 | Wild 'n Out | Himself / Various | 16 episodes |
| 2006; 2007 | The Bold and the Beautiful | E.R. Doctor | 2 episodes |
| 2006; 2007 | Mad TV | Bobby's Cousin / Korean Man / Ando | 3 episodes |
| 2007 | Nick Cannon Presents: Short Circuitz | Police Officer / Hypeman Waiter / Bjork | 3 episodes |
| 2007 | Cold Case | Manny Kim '07 | Episode: "That Woman" |
| 2008 | iCarly | Mr. Palladino | Episode: "iGot Detention" |
| 2008 | The Sarah Silverman Program | Mongolian Aide | Episode: "The Mongolian Beef" |
| 2008 | Eli Stone | Chris Kim | Episode: "Unwritten" |
| 2008 | Zip | Mr. Yu | Television film |
| 2008 | The Apostles | Ettinger | Television film |
| 2009 | Gary Unmarried | Dr. Greenberg | Episode: "Gary Tries to Do It All" |
| 2009 | Curb Your Enthusiasm | Doctor | Episode: "The Table Read" |
| 2010–11 | Svetlana | Dr. Park | 3 episodes |
| 2010; 2015 | Community | Crime Boss / Himself | 2 episodes |
| 2011–13 | Supah Ninjas | Martin Fukanaga | Recurring role, 27 episodes |
| 2011 | CSI: Crime Scene Investigation | Scott Katsu | Episode: "Turn On, Tune In, Drop Dead" |
| 2011 | A Series of Unfortunate People | Odd Man / Jay / Barry | 3 episodes |
| 2011 | Random Comedies | Joe | Episode: "Open House" |
| 2012 | New Girl | Will | Episode: "Fancyman Part 1" |
| 2012 | The Office | Steve/Asian Jim | Episode: "Andy's Ancestry" |
| 2012 | A Car Called Wanda | Richard | Episode: "It Wasn’t a Roofie" |
| 2012 | Slanted | Kai | Episode: "Paying Your Dues" |
| 2012–17 | Veep | Governor Danny Chung | Recurring role, 13 episodes |
| 2013 | Infomercials | Mark | Episode: "Broomshakalaka!" |
| 2013 | Mr. Box Office | Larry Kung | Episode: "Marcus Gets Kung Pow'd" |
| 2013–14 | The Mindy Project | Dr. Colin Lee | 3 episodes |
| 2014 | Newsreaders | Clavis Kim | 3 episodes |
| 2014; 2018 | Robot Chicken | Kim Jong-un / Li Shang / Charon / Red Power Ranger | Voice, 2 episodes |
| 2015 | Repeat After Me | Himself | Episode: "#1.5" |
| 2015 | Wet Hot American Summer: First Day of Camp | Jeff | 4 episodes |
| 2015 | Comedy Bang! Bang! | Himself | Episode: "Randall Park Wears Brown Dress Shoes With Blue Socks" |
| 2015–20 | Fresh Off the Boat | Louis Huang | Regular role Nominated – Critics' Choice Television Award for Best Actor in a Comedy Series (2016, 2017) |
| 2016 | Idiotsitter | Hank | Episode: "GED Prom" |
| 2016 | Childrens Hospital | Jamyang | Episode: "Show Me a Hero" |
| 2016 | Dr. Ken | Gary Chon | Episode: "Korean Men's Club" |
| 2016 | $100,000 Pyramid | Himself | Episode: "Randall Park vs. Anna Camp" |
| 2016 | Bajillion Dollar Propertie$ | Grieg | Episode: "Day of the Diamond Dealmakers" |
| 2017 | Michael Bolton's Big, Sexy Valentine's Day Special | Blair | Netflix variety special |
| 2017 | Love | Tommy | 2 episodes |
| 2017 | Angie Tribeca | Dr. Moreau | Episode: "Brockman Turner Overdrive" |
| 2017 | Drop the Mic | Himself | Episode: "James Van Der Beek vs. Randall Park / Gina Rodriguez vs. Rob Gronkowski" |
| 2017 | Do You Want to See a Dead Body? | Himself | Episode: "A Body and a Crater" |
| 2018 | Hot Streets | Donovan Kim | Voice, episode: "Got a Minute for Love?" |
| 2018 | Drunk History | Jamukha | Episode: "The Middle Ages" |
| 2018 | Animals. | Nikolai | Voice, episode: "The Democratic People's Republic of Kitty City" |
| 2018 | Art Prison | Himself | Adult Swim TV special |
| 2018; 2020 | BoJack Horseman | Moose / Hotel Concierge / American Tourist | Voice, 2 episodes |
| 2019 | Hell's Kitchen | Himself | Episode: "Devilish Desserts" |
| 2019 | What Just Happened??! with Fred Savage | Himself | Episode: "Neighbor" |
| 2020 | Medical Police | Clavis Kim | 4 episodes |
| 2020 | Mao Mao: Heroes of Pure Heart | Eugene | Voice, episode: "Adoradad" |
| 2020 | Adventure Time: Distant Lands | Hugo | Voice, episode: "BMO" |
| 2020 | American Dad! | Doctor | Voice, episode: "Trophy Wife, Trophy Life" |
| 2020 | Where's Waldo? | Wizard Shadowbeard | Voice, episode: "Shadow of Bali" |
| 2021 | WandaVision | Jimmy Woo | Regular role, 6 episodes |
| 2021 | Marvel Studios: Assembled | Himself | Documentary; Episode: "Assembled: The Making of WandaVision" |
| 2021 | Tuca & Bertie | Bertie's father | Voice, 2 episodes |
| 2021 | Star Trek: Lower Decks | Apergosian High Leader | Voice, episode: "Strange Energies" |
| 2021 | Amend: The Fight for America | Himself | 3 episodes |
| 2021 | Doogie Kameāloha, M.D. | Dr. Edmund Choi | 2 episodes |
| 2021–23 | Young Rock | Future version of himself | Recurring role, 29 episodes |
| 2022 | Ghostwriter | Lion | Episode: "Ghost of Oz, Part 1" |
| 2022 | Blockbuster | Timmy Yoon | Main role |
| 2022–23 | Human Resources | Peter "Pete" Doheny | Voice, main role |
| 2023 | Gremlins: Secrets of the Mogwai | Yao/Odd-Odd | Voice, episode: "Always Buy a Ticket" |
| 2023 | Solar Opposites | Mr. Sarner | Voice, episode: "The Ping Pong Table" |
| 2023 | Big Mouth | Peter "Pete" Doheny | Voice, episode: "Panic! At The Mall" |
| 2023 | Blue Eye Samurai | Heiji Shindo | Voice, 8 episodes |
| 2024 | Clone High | Frida's Adopted Dad | Voice, episode: "Cyranos: A Portmant-opus" |
| 2024 | Krapopolis | Loki | Voice, episode: "Thor" |
| 2024 | It's Florida, Man | Real Steve | Episode: "Toes" |
| 2025 | Watson | James Moriarty | Recurring |
| 2025 | The Residence | Edwin Park | Main role |
| 2025 | Marvel Zombies | Jimmy Woo | Voice, 2 episodes |
| 2025–26 | Haunted Hotel | Joel | Voice, 2 episodes |
| 2026 | Among Us | Red | Voice |
| 2026 | Minimum Wage | Mr. Sylvester | Netflix series, main role; 28 episodes |

=== Music videos ===
| Year | Artist | Title | Notes |
|---|---|---|---|
| 2015 | Eminem | "Phenomenal" | |
| 2013 | Chester See | "Whistle While I Work It" | |

=== Web series ===
| Year | Title | Role | Notes |
|---|---|---|---|
| 2006 | Dr. Miracles | Dr. Miracles | Also writer/director |
| 2009 | Greendale Community College Webisodes | Brody Leitz | Promos for Community |
| 2009 | The Food | Wallace | Also writer |
| 2009–10 | IKEA Heights | James | YouTube Series only filmed in IKEA without staff noticing |
| 2010 | Too Fast | Brandon | Wong Fu Productions short |
| 2010 | Dumb Professor | Professor Raymond Nash | Also writer/director |
| 2010 | Weekend Forecast | Tokyo Mitsubishi | MagicHugs short |
| 2010 | Workout Tape | Ronny Nishimoto | MagicHugs short |
| 2011 | Siamese Dad | Russell | Also writer/director |
| 2011 | The Game Station - The Street Fighter | Kenneth | |
| 2012 | The Game Station - The Return of King Hippo | Roommate | |
| 2012 | Listen to Grandpa, Andy Ling | Andy Ling | Starred opposite Elliott Gould |
| 2012 | Home Is Where The Hans Are | Andrew | Wong Fu Productions short |
| 2013 | Baby Mentalist | Detective Chung | Also writer |
| 2014 | CollegeHumor - If Google was a Guy (2) | Bing | |
| 2014 | Talking Marriage with Ryan Bailey | Himself | Guest with JaeLego |
| 2018 | Asian Bachelorette 2 | Himself | Wong Fu Productions short |
| 2023 | Good Mythical Morning | Himself | Guest |
| 2024 | IF | John Krasinski | Promotional material only |
| 2024 | Rhett and Link's Wonderhole | Squirrel | Episode: "Chopping Down a Tree Using Peanut Butter" |
| 2026 | Cardboard Wars | Red Leader | Fan film |

=== Theater ===
| Year | Title | Role | Notes |
|---|---|---|---|
| 2026 | Spectacular | Stan Lee | |

== Discography ==
with Ill Again

- Self Titled (2004)

with Novelists

- Bookends (2008)

== Select awards and recognition ==
- 2010 – Best Actor Award at NBC's Short Cuts Film Festival.
- 2011 – Coalition of Asian Pacifics in Entertainment New Writers Award for the pilot Erasists
- 2015 – Asian Pacific Alumni Alumnus of the Year Award
- 2015 – V3Con Visibility Award
- 2016 – Edward A. Dickson Alumnus of the Year
- 2017 – Visionary Award by East West Players (EWP)
- 2022 – Children's and Family Emmy Award for Outstanding Guest Performance for Doogie Kameāloha, M.D. (Nominated)
