= Aaron Yoo =

American actor (born 1979)

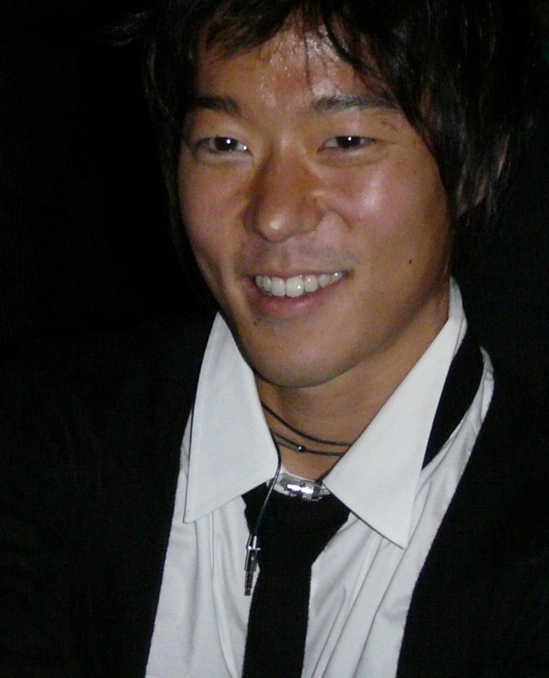
- Yoo at the 2008 Toronto International Film Festival
- Born: May 12, 1979 (age 47); Dallas, Texas, U.S.
- Occupation: Actor
- Years active: 2000–present
- Spouse: Fara Homidi (m. 2014)

Aaron Yoo (born May 12, 1979) is an American actor. He is best known for appearing in the films Disturbia (2007), 21 (2008), and Friday the 13th (2009), as well as playing Russell Kwon in the sci-fi series The Tomorrow People (2013–14).

== Career ==
He starred in Disturbia, Rocket Science, and American Pastime (all 2007); 21, Nick and Norah's Infinite Playlist, and The Wackness (all 2008); and Labor Pains and the Friday the 13th reboot (both 2009).

Shortly before filming of Friday the 13th began, Yoo had his appendix removed; as a result, he could not film his scenes right away. As soon as he was ready for filming, director Marcus Nispel immediately hung him upside down from some rafters, exposing the staples over his surgical wound, for the character's post-death shot.

His stage credits include a 2002 revival of Lope de Vega's Fuente Ovejuna, Mac Wellman's Cellophane (2003), and the premiere of Christopher Shinn's Where Do We Live and the anthology production Savage Acts (both 2004).

== Personal life ==
Aaron Yoo was born in Dallas, Texas, to Korean parents. When he was 8, his family moved from Edison to East Brunswick, New Jersey. He has an older sister. He attended East Brunswick High School, where he played cello in the orchestra and ran track; he graduated in 1997. Afterwards, he studied at the University of Pennsylvania, where he was a member of the Sigma Nu fraternity. He graduated in 2001 with a degree in theatre, and worked for Siemens corporate from 2001 to 2003.

He is married to Fara Homidi, who works in the fashion industry as a make-up artist. In his spare time, he practices DJing, pole vaulting, and playing the cello. He is fully bilingual in Korean and English.

== Filmography ==
=== Film ===
| Year | Title | Role | Notes |
|---|---|---|---|
| 2005 | Things That Go Bump in the Night | Brad | |
| 2006 | Dry Clean Only | Dry Cleaners Clerk | |
| 2007 | Rocket Science | Heston | |
| 2007 | American Pastime | Lyle Nomura | |
| 2007 | Disturbia | Ronald "Ronnie" Chu | |
| 2008 | The Wackness | Justin | |
| 2008 | 21 | Choi | |
| 2008 | 364 Cranes | Tommy | |
| 2008 | Nick and Norah's Infinite Playlist | Thom | |
| 2009 | Friday the 13th | Chewie | |
| 2009 | The Good Guy | Steve-O | |
| 2009 | Labor Pains | Miles | |
| 2009 | Gamer | Humanz Dude | |
| 2010 | A Nightmare on Elm Street | Marcus Yeon | Uncredited |
| 2011 | She Wants Me | Max | |
| 2011 | 10 Years | Peter Jung | |
| 2013 | McCanick | Carl | |
| 2014 | Kid Cannabis | Brendan Butler | |
| 2015 | Demonic | Donnie | |
| 2015 | Someone Else | Jamie | |
| 2015 | Everything Before Us | Ben | |
| 2016 | Money Monster | Won Joon | |
| 2017 | Killing Gunther | Yong | |
| 2021 | Wish Dragon | Pockets (voice) | |
| 2026 | Bedford Park | Henry | |

=== Television ===
| Year | Title | Role | Notes |
|---|---|---|---|
| 2003 | Ed | Student Ethan | 1 episode |
| 2004 | Law & Order: Special Victims Unit | Tommy | 1 episode |
| 2005 | Cinema AZN | DVD reviewer | Unknown episode(s) |
| 2006 | Love Monkey | Staffer #2 | 1 episode |
| 2006 | The Bedford Diaries | James Fong | Recurring role |
| 2008 | ER | Kwan Li | 1 episode |
| 2010 | Drop Dead Diva | Edward Kim | 1 episode |
| 2010 | The Closer | John Park | S6E12 (High Crimes) |
| 2013–14 | The Tomorrow People | Russell Kwan | Main role |
| 2015, 2023 | The Blacklist | The Troll Farmer / Bo Chang | 3 episodes |
| 2016-2017 | StartUp | Alex Bell | Seasons 1 & 2 |
| 2018 | Hawaii Five-0 | Hideki Tashiro | 2 episodes |
| 2024 | Criminal Minds | Roger Song | 1 episode |
