= David Choi =

American singer-songwriter

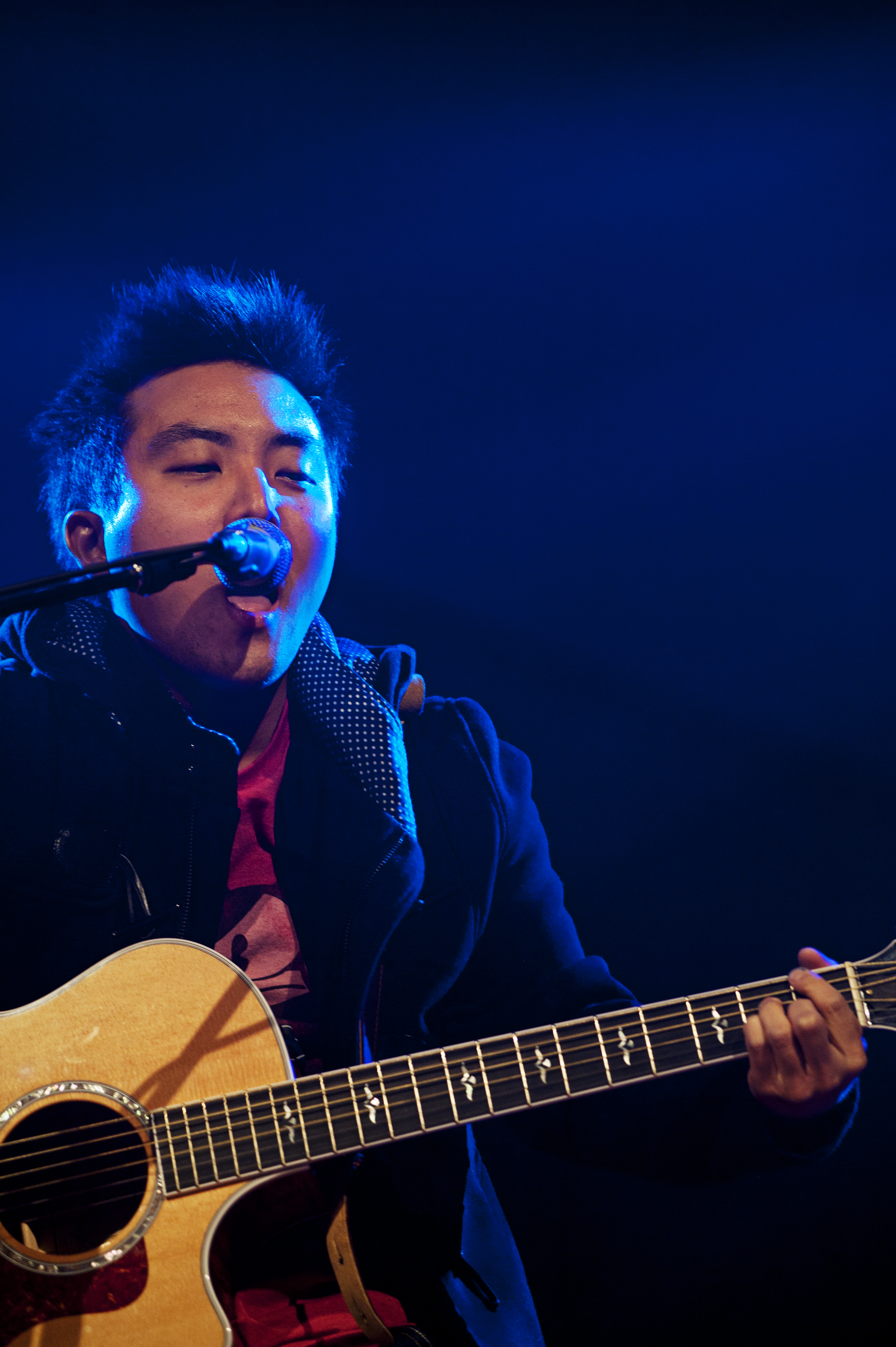
- Choi performing live

Background information
- Born: March 22, 1986 (age 40); Anaheim, California, U.S.
- Origin: Garden Grove, California, U.S.
- Genres: Pop; pop rock; alternative rock; soul; acoustic
- Occupations: Singer; songwriter; record producer
- Instruments: Vocals; guitar; keyboards; bass; ukulele; percussion; violin; banjo
- Years active: 2002–present
- Label: Unsigned
- Website: David Choi official site

David Choi (born March 22, 1986) is an American singer, songwriter, producer, music composer, entrepreneur, YouTuber, and a member of parody K-pop group BgA based in Los Angeles. He has worked with companies such as Kellogg's, Starburst, the American Cancer Society, General Electric, Samsung, and J. C. Penney.

David is also the founder and CEO of CHOIS MUSIC, INC, an independent music label, publisher, rights management service provider, that helps to manage and administer music catalogs on behalf of their clients.

Choi released his debut album, Only You, in October 2008. His second album, By My Side, was released on May 19, 2010, and his third album, Forever and Ever was released on October 25, 2011. On February 15, 2015, he released his fourth album Stories of You's and Me.

As of September 14, 2021, Choi's YouTube Channel has 949,000 subscribers, 111 million total video views, and more than 13 million channel views. As of November 2011, he was YouTube's 15th-most-subscribed musician and 62nd-most-subscribed user overall.

Choi previously worked as a songwriter and producer at Warner/Chappell Music, which signed him on after his participation in an American Society of Composers, Authors and Publishers (ASCAP) workshop called the Lester Sill Workshop.

His humorous "YouTube, A Love Song", which helped launch his singing career, was featured on the homepage of YouTube in 2006, and has received over 2.8 million views. The music videos for his singles "Won't Even Start" and "That Girl", which are posted on both his and directors' Wong Fu Productions' YouTube channels, have received a total of over 13 million views. He also posts non-music vlogs on his second channel. Choi often appears in online videos with fellow YouTube personalities, like Ryan Higa and Wong Fu Productions, who often use Choi's music in their videos.

Choi co-founded a tech company called Takko in 2020, a platform for asynchronous video chatting, which had the backing of notable investors like NEA, Dreamer's VC, Mucker Capital, and Canaan. His startup was acquired in 2023.

== Early life ==
Choi was born in Anaheim, California, on March 22, 1986. He is of Korean descent and comes from a musical family: His parents, Ray and Jane Choi, own a music store named "Grace Store," and his father plays the autoharp. With an artistic mother and musical father, Choi was surrounded by music growing up and does not think he would have pursued music today without these influences.

At a young age, Choi was required to play the piano and violin, an experience that he did not enjoy. In fact, Choi would get in trouble with his parents for not practicing. He does not remember much about practicing his violin; however, he does recall wanting to smash it several times. The Internet star says that his hate for practicing made him hate everything about the violin and piano to the point where he even began to hate music itself. Even though it was not his favorite thing to do, Choi does admit that it was nice when he got to leave class twice a week to attend his orchestra class. Choi says that class was easier for him than it was for some of the other kids because he had already covered some of the material through his private lessons. The unlikely musician thus became the concertmaster of his school orchestra. He would play classical and jazz music, and never being exposed a pop song until sixth grade, when he heard Smash Mouth's "All Star". Soon after, he discovered "All the Small Things" by blink-182 and attempted to play the song on guitar. Choi began to listen to more and more pop songs and fell in love with the Backstreet Boys, Boyz II Men, and Japanese pop. In junior high Choi would stay up late listening to the radio, recording the songs and began to make his own mix tapes. Choi then began to write his own songs and his first instrumental piece was a song titled "Lost Memory", written on the piano. Even after discovering pop music Choi stayed in the school orchestra. Pressured by his parents, Choi was forced to audition for the Gifted And Talented Education (GATE) orchestra. Choi rehearsed with this orchestra every Tuesday.

Choi eventually stopped taking violin lessons in high school, and started jazz piano lessons in ninth grade. He began composing music, and won his first accolade after submitting an instrumental pop song entitled "I'm Really Happy When" for a contest.

== Career ==
=== Early career (2002–06) ===
Choi's original compositions were recorded digitally with the use of a program called Acid Pro. Choi taught himself how to use the program within several days of downloading it, and he learned a few songwriting tips from a friend.

In 2005, Choi won the grand prize in David Bowie's Mashup contest, where Bowie chose the grand prize winner. He appeared in USA Weekend Magazine alongside Usher, after he received the grand prize for the magazine's John Lennon Songwriting Contest for teens. These achievements marked the start of Choi's musical career: He was signed to Warner Chappell Music, where he was initially placed as a staff songwriter and producer.

David's humorous "YouTube (A Love Song)", was uploaded on December 30, 2006, and brought him "overnight" fame. Choi followed the success of "YouTube (A Love Song)" with other humorous and heartfelt songs, such as "By My Side" and "I Think I Like You": "My Company" is considered a "half-humorous, half-love" song. Unbeknownst to him, his YouTube love song was posted on the homepage of YouTube. He found out when a friend told him. He soon received requests for new songs, a live performance, and an album. He wanted to release his songs in an album, but as he was already technically a signed songwriter/producer at that time: He had to go through legal procedures and accept a variety of contractual conditions. Thus, he left Warner and stayed unsigned to carry on with his own album release.

=== Only You (2007–08) ===
Choi released his first album in 2008. Entitled Only You. It contained mainly love songs, notably "Love", "Won't Even Start", "Something To Believe," and "Only You". In 2009, he released a Korean special edition of the album, containing three bonus tracks. "Won't Even Start" became his hit single, and he released a music video for it, collaborating with Wong Fu Productions in producing his first official music video.

=== By My Side (2009–10) ===
On February 21, 2009, he performed at the annual Kollaboration talent show, and within a space of half a year (4th quarter 2009 to 1st Quarter 2010), Choi compiled composed songs into his second album, By My Side, released on May 18, 2010. He released a music video for its lead single "That Girl" on the same day. The music video was produced by him and his friends via Wong Fu Productions. It starred Julia Chang as 'that girl' opposite him, and it was his second collaboration with the production company. He also released a Korean edition, with two bonus tracks: "Valentines" and "My Company".

On January 14, 2014, he released the Indonesian-English version of By My Side with Indonesian singer Maudy Ayunda. The lyrics were translated with the help of book writer-musician, Dewi Lestari.

=== Forever and Ever (2011–2016) ===
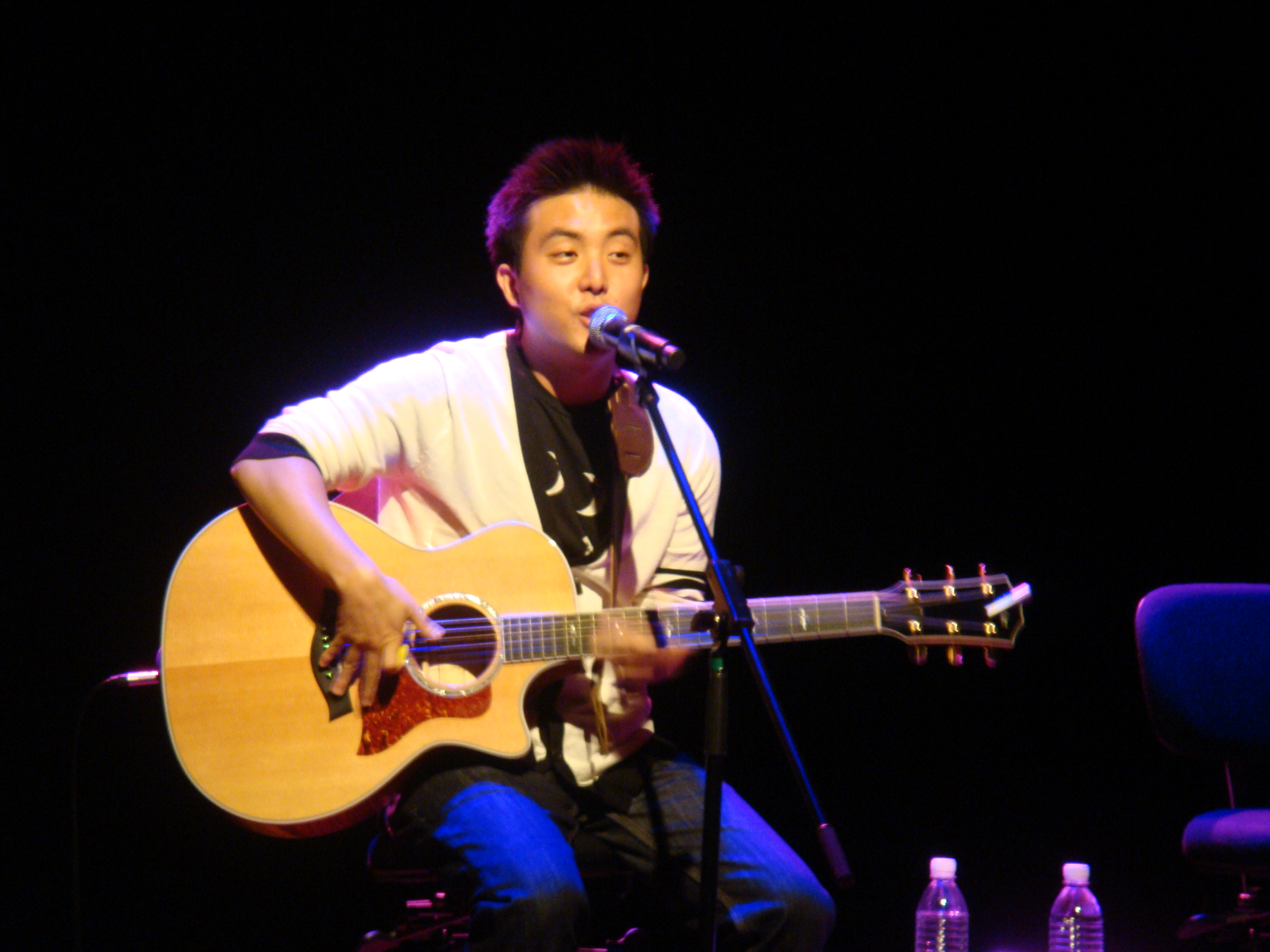
Choi singing "This And That" at the Esplanade in Singapore

During his 2011 tours, Choi sang two songs he wrote the year before, "You Were My Friend" and "This and That is Life". He has said that a third album will include these two songs. On July 7, 2011, Choi released his third music video, for his single "By My Side", once again a collaboration with Wong Fu Productions. Choi also started to help his father, Ray Choi, in uploading YouTube videos of him playing the autoharp. His song "I Choose Happiness", of which the instrumental version is used in KevJumba and Wong Fu Productions videos, was also chosen to be used in the 2011 film Lucky starring Colin Hanks. It was also featured in an episode of ABC's Make It or Break It. Choi released his third album, Forever and Ever, on October 25, 2011.

== Tours ==
Choi's first tour, from November 12 to 19, 2009, was in the West Coast cities of San Diego, Los Angeles, San Francisco, Portland, and Seattle, as well as in Vancouver, British Columbia, Canada. In 2010 Choi embarked on his second tour singing live in the East Coast cities of Washington, D.C., New York, Boston, and Chicago as well as Toronto, Ontario, Canada. The year after, he visited those few cities again.

In August 2010, Choi went to Singapore for vacation and to tour. He was there for eleven days, and on his vacation day, he went to Sentosa and Night Safari. In 2011, he went on a short tour around North America again: "Spring Tour" included Houston, Chicago, and Hawaii. He also frequented Korea.

In summer 2011, Choi announced another tour – his first continental Asia-Pacific tour (with a focus on Southeast Asia). He went to Hong Kong, Indonesia, Philippines, Singapore, Malaysia and Australia. In Australia, Choi was supported by Australian acts Amelia Jae and Jayesslee. In Singapore, he had Inch Chua do introductory songs and sing his and Kina Grannis' "My Time With You". Again on this tour, Choi went to small venues, like the 245-capacity Esplanade Recital Studio.

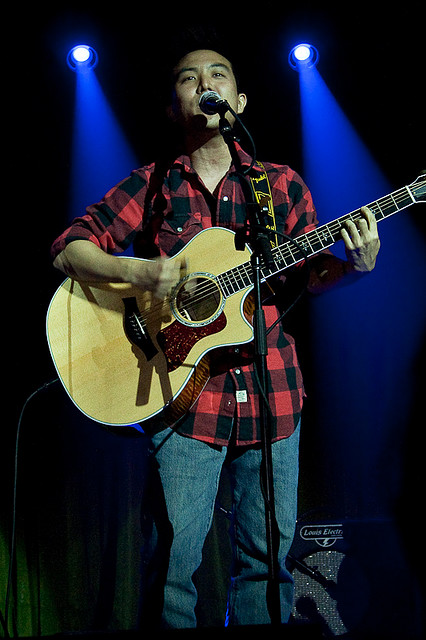
Choi in concert

On his tours, Choi has meet-and-greet sessions with his fans.

In January 2012, Choi announced his Forever and Ever USA/Canada tour. He went to 20 cities across the US and Canada, starting in Phoenix on February 2 and ending in Chicago on April 2. In May, Choi started on his third tour to the Asia-Pacific: Melbourne, Adelaide, Sydney, Jakarta, Manila, Kuala Lumpur, Hong Kong, Seoul and Tokyo. In September 2012, he and Clara Chung embarked on their Fall Tour presented by YesStyle, visiting 19 cities all over the US and Canada, starting in Los Angeles and ending in Orange County.

== Style ==
=== Genre and lyrics ===
Choi's music genre falls mostly under the modern "ballad" genre, his songs being slow, mostly about love and relationships. He describes his own music as "poppy with a hint of jazz and folk." His songs have been described as "often to melt girls' hearts."

He often uses happy melodies, for example in "Something to Believe" and "My Time with You".

=== Public image ===
Choi has been portrayed by "netizens" and fans as a sad and solemn person, with a poker face: Such perceptions were bolstered by the absence of images of Choi smiling. In response to such claims, Choi publicly promised that he would not smile until he reached 77,777 subscribers on YouTube (this goal was subsequently accomplished).

== Discography ==
- Only You (2008; CD digipak and iTunes)
- Only You (2009; Korean special edition CD)
- By My Side (2010; CD digipak and iTunes)
- By My Side (2010; Korean special edition CD)
- YouTube Covers, Vol. 1 (2010; iTunes)
- YouTube Covers, Vol. 2 (2010; iTunes)
- YouTube Covers, Vol. 3 (2010; iTunes)
- Forever and Ever (2011; CD iTunes and Spotify)
- Stories of You's and Me (2015; iTunes and Spotify)
- The David Choi Christmas Album (2016; iTunes and Spotify)

== In other media ==
=== Song use in other media ===
Year	Used in (producers)	Type	Song
2008	J.C. Penney web ad	"Back-to-School Interactive Initiative"	"My Time With You"(with Kina Grannis)
2009	Up in Da Club (Wong Fu Productions)	4-part series	"Something To Believe
2009	He Who Can't Marry	Korean drama	"Something To Believe"
2009	We Got Married	Korean variety show	"Something To Believe"
2010	Playful Kiss	Korean drama	"Won't Even Start" "Happiness is Always Near"
2010	Iris (Japanese version)	Korean drama	"Something To Believe"
2010	Secret Garden	Korean drama	"Love"
2010	Agents of Secret Stuff (HigaTV and Wong Fu)	Web film	"My Time With You"(with Kina Grannis)
2010	The Good Guys	American show	"Something To Believe"
2010	Pasta	Korean drama	"Happiness Is Always Near"
2011	Athena: Goddess of War	Korean drama	"Enjoy The View"
2011	Strangers, again (Wong Fu Productions)	Short Story	"So Weightless"
2011	My Princess	Korean drama	"By My Side" "Won't Even Start" "Thief in the Night" "Heaven's Ease"
2011	All My Love	Korean drama	"Happily Ever After" "해피 몽땅" "My Time With You"
2011	Samsung Zipel Grandstyle ad	Fridge advertisement	"By My Side"
2011	Renault SM5 (Samsung) ad	Car advertisement	"Only You"
2011	Lucky	Movie	"I Choose Happiness"
2012	MBLAQ's Hello Baby (seventh episode)	Reality show	"Something to Believe"
2012	To the Beautiful You	Korean drama	"Enjoy The View"
2012	Hero	Korean drama	"Something To Believe"
2012	Rascal Sons	Korean drama	"By My Side"
2014	Cunning Single Lady (thirteenth episode)	Korean drama	"By My Side"
2014	Let's Eat (sixteenth episode)	Korean drama	"Always Hurt"
2015	A Girl Who Sees Smells (fifth episode)	Korean drama	"By My Side"
2015	Age of Youth	Korean drama	"Enjoy the View"

=== Filmography and TV appearances ===
Year	Title	Producer	Role
2010	Funemployed (episodes 7,8,10 & 11)	Wong Fu Productions	Aaron (music teacher)
2010	The Allergy	Wong Fu Productions	Henry's girlfriend
2010	BEST CREW – The Audition	Nigahiga	Jeffery (the new member)
2010	Interview with Channel News Asia (TV appearance)	Mediacorp	Himself
2011	Strangers, again	Wong Fu Productions	Donald (Don)
2011	THE ANNIVERSARY	David Choi Music	Himself
2012	Textreme	Wong Fu Productions	Ethan
2013	The Winner Is	Talpa Media USA / Universal Television	Himself

== Awards and nominations ==
Year	Award	Nominated work	Category	Result
2004	David Bowie Mash-up Contest	"Big Shakin' Car" (Mashup of "Shake it" and "She'll Drive a Big Car")	N/A	Won
2004	John Lennon Songwriting Contest	Himself	Teens	Won
2004	Songwriter Universe Song of the Month	"Anything You Want"	February	Won

== See also ==
- List of YouTube personalities
