= Wong Fu Productions =

American filmmaking group

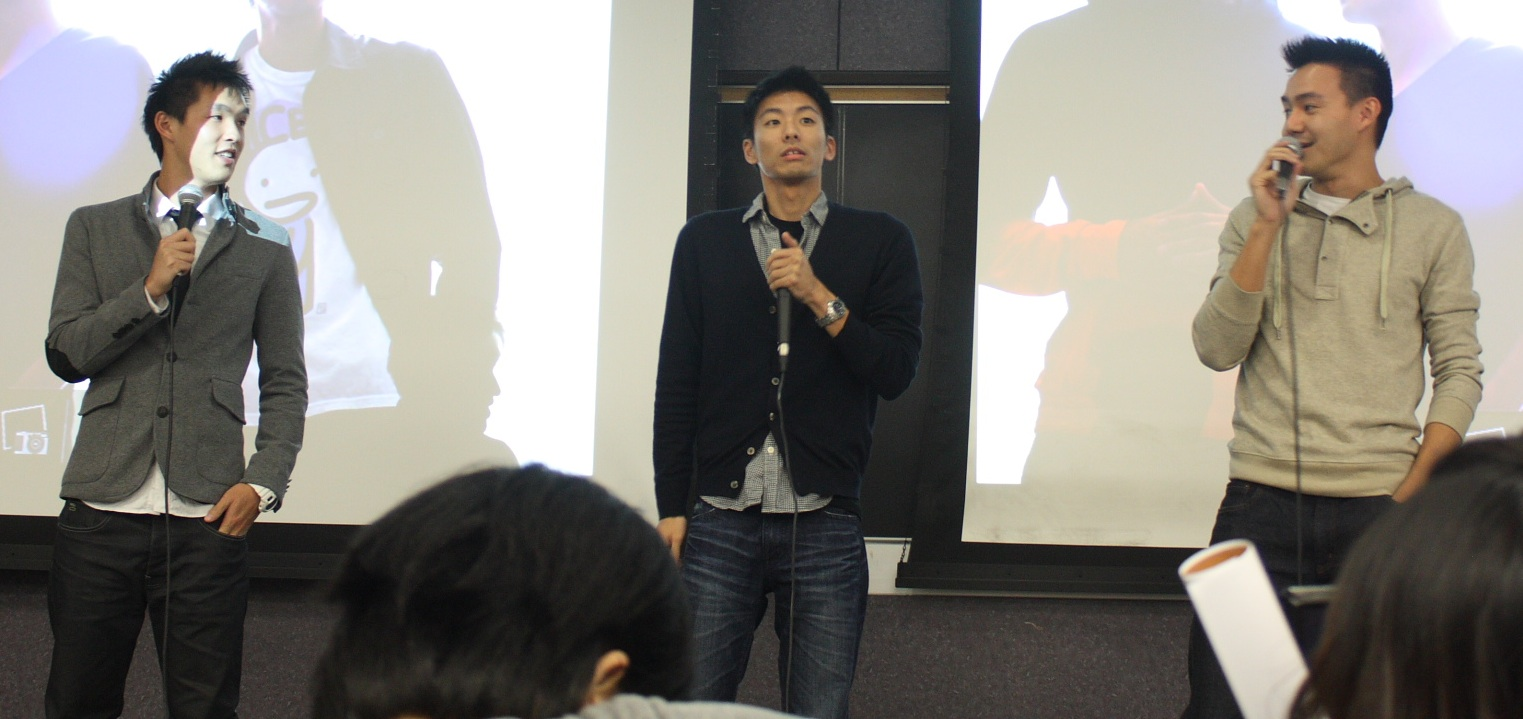
- Chan, Fu, and Wang speaking
- Founded: 2003
- Headquarters: Los Angeles County, United States
- Number of employees: 8 (as of 2021)
- Website: wongfuproductions.com

Wesley Chan
- 陳德偉
- Born: April 27, 1984 (age 42)
- Education: University of California, San Diego
- Years active: 2003–present
- Website: wongfuproductions.com

Philip Wang
- 王振翔
- Born: October 28, 1984 (age 41)
- Education: University of California, San Diego
- Years active: 2003–present
- Spouse: Helen Wu (m. 2021)
- Website: wongfuproductions.com

Ted Fu
- 傅大誠
- Born: October 26, 1981 (age 44)
- Education: University of California, San Diego
- Years active: 2003–present
- Website: wongfuproductions.com

Wong Fu Productions (Note: Short films by Wong Fu Productions prior to the group's graduation from the University of California, San Diego, included a logo with the Chinese characters for "Wong Fu" (Chinese: 王夫; pinyin: Wáng Fū; Jyutping: Wong4 Fu1). The last film to feature this logo was License Plate, released on August 18, 2006. Films produced after the group's move to Los Angeles did not feature this logo.) is an American filmmaking group founded by Wesley Chan (born April 27, 1984), Ted Fu (born October 26, 1981), and Philip Wang (born October 28, 1984). The trio met at the University of California, San Diego in 2004 and produced a number of music videos and short films released on their website and later YouTube before establishing a professional media company, Sketchbook Media, after their graduation. Their works have been featured at a number of national and international film festivals, including the Los Angeles Asian Pacific Film Festival and the San Diego Asian Film Festival.

As of April 2021, Wong Fu Productions' YouTube channel has over 3.27 million subscribers and over 584 million video views. Since 2011, the group has developed a reputation as a springboard for Asian American acting talent. Actors such as Randall Park (WandaVision), Justin H. Min (The Umbrella Academy), Anna Akana (Ant-Man), Brittany Ishibashi (Runaways), Victoria Park (The Flash), and Simu Liu (Shang-Chi and the Legend of the Ten Rings) have all previously starred in Wong Fu films prior to their appearances on their respective superhero projects.

== History ==
According to Philip Wang, Wong Fu Productions was unofficially established in 2001 during his high school junior year at Northgate High School (Walnut Creek, California) in Walnut Creek, California. He mainly utilized his family's digital camcorder to film school projects in collaboration with classmates. In his first year as an undeclared freshman at the University of California, San Diego (UCSD), Wang and his friends released a music video of Justin Timberlake's song "Señorita". It was the first music video he produced, although he did not actively promote it, the video was quickly circulated among other fellow college students. The video was circulated in its original computer file format because it was released prior to the advent of the video sharing platform YouTube.

In 2004, Wang met classmates Wesley Chan (who graduated from Mills High School in 2002) and Ted Fu through a school production, and the three began working on small-scale projects for class assignments and in their spare time. They did not originally consider filmmaking as a career when they entered university; Chan explored an interest in animation, Fu had been a student in electrical engineering and Wang considered a career in economics. After graduation in 2006, the three moved to the Los Angeles area and continued their venture under the professional name Sketchbook Media.

After approximately five years, Wong Fu Productions garnered one million subscribers in 2011. On June 8, 2013, Wong Fu Productions celebrated their ten year anniversary and produced a 13 minute short on June 29 featuring Christine Chen, the surrounding cast of Wong Fu, and many familiar faces, including Ryan Higa, Dominic Sandoval (D-Trix), Kevin Wu (KevJumba), Freddie Wong, Brandon Laatsch, Joe Penna (MysteryGuitarMan) and The Fung Brothers.

On July 23, 2013, Wong Fu Productions launched a second channel titled "More Wong Fu" which is described as "Home of Lunch Break, WF Recess, Failed It, FIRST, bloopers, behind the scenes, and special features. It's, just.. more Wong Fu."

Wong Fu has begun to expand their team of creators. The current team includes Taylor Chan (senior editor/writer and director), Benson Quach (producer/assistant director), Christopher Yang (director of photography), Jessica Lin (production coordinator), and Michelle Hsieh (editor).

== Notable productions ==
If at the end of the day there's someone out there who has a better day because of us, then we've succeeded. — Wong Fu Productions motto

Wong Fu Productions was initially known for its independent music videos of contemporary hit songs such as Maroon 5's "Sunday Morning" and Jason Mraz's "I'm Yours". Wong Fu released its first major short film called Yellow Fever on January 25, 2006. The film, which satirized the topic of interracial dating between Asian Americans and White Americans, brought Wong Fu into recognition among many college students in the United States.

A Moment with You, the group's first feature-length film, premiered on June 3, 2006, at their alma mater. It was also screened at the San Diego Asian Film Festival on October 18, 2006. The film revolves around two neighbors who share similar romantic situations, in which one person in each relationship cannot let go of his or her past. A Moment with You was promoted through a screening tour at high schools and universities around the United States and Canada. In a review for the Massachusetts Institute of Technology's student newspaper The Tech, Tina Ro wrote: "Despite its large Asian fan base, Wongfu's [sic] movie has a cast of equal numbers of Asians and Caucasians. Furthermore, all the characters were shaped by their own characteristics rather than by their race, a refreshing concept for a movie." According to The Daily Texan's Katherine Fan, A Moment with You featured a "more mature, introspective mood than their previous work."

Following the success of A Moment with You, Wong Fu was approached to create a second film called Sleep Shift. However, the project was abandoned after producers disagreed with casting an Asian male in the film's lead role. Since the end of its first tour, Wong Fu has created music videos for rising artists and continued producing short films. The group's merchandise line, which included original T-shirt designs, was launched in conjunction with the 2007 film Just a Nice Guy. The short film The Spare was featured at the 2008 San Francisco International Asian American Film Festival, and two additional short films—At Musing's End and A Peace of Home—were shown at the 2009 Cannes Film Festival Short Films Corner. In September 2009, Wong Fu released the short film Poser!, a mockumentary on the history of the peace sign. As of November 2009, Wong Fu Productions has created more than 130 short films and music videos. Because the group does not require a fee to view its films, it gains a salary from being a YouTube partner, draws profits from merchandise sales, public speaking on university campuses, and music video production for rising Asian American artists.

In May 2010, Wong Fu Productions and Ryan Higa opened talks about creating a major film. The movie was filmed in a one-week period during the summer, and was released to the public on November 23, while being released on YouTube a day later as Agents of Secret Stuff starring Ryan Higa and Arden Cho.

On September 7, 2011, Wong Fu Productions announced that they have been hired by Taiwanese pop singer Wang Leehom to direct his upcoming music video "Still In Love With You".

=== International Secret Agents ===
In the addition to the group's filmmaking career, Wong Fu Productions has organized a series of multidisciplinary concerts in California. The concert series, International Secret Agents (ISA), featured musical disciplines from urban dance to deejaying with Asian American guest artists such as Far East Movement. Additional guest performances included America's Best Dance Crew champions Quest Crew and Poreotics, Ryan Higa (a.k.a. Nigahiga), Kevin Wu (a.k.a. KevJumba), Jay Park, and singers–songwriters David Choi and Kina Grannis. According to Chinese American rapper Jin, "ISA is about self-branding and viral marketing—using YouTube, MySpace, Facebook, and the Internet to promote yourself as an artist." He asserted, "We as artists are aware of this and make ourselves available [on these mediums]." Far East Movement member Virman Coquia said, "We want to give back to the community to show that Asians can have an influence today in the U.S." Additionally, Coquia believed that ISA presented the opportunity to present Asian American talent as cool and mainstream.

The first ISA concert was held in September 2008 at the San Gabriel Mission Playhouse in Los Angeles. A second concert was held in March 2009 at the Palace of Fine Arts in San Francisco, and both events were attended by a sold-out crowd. The concert returned to Los Angeles in September 2009 and was sponsored by department store J. C. Penney. In 2010, ISA was held in New York City for the first time. Wong Fu has also expressed interest in holding future ISA concerts in Washington, D.C. They also had another ISA concert in Los Angeles on September 5. Playing up the name "International Secret Agents", The LA leg of the 2010 ISA Concert was filled with surprises as secret guests like Nick Cannon showed up to join the performers on stage.

On March 30, 2013, ISA held and filmed their first game show at YouTube Space Los Angeles. The event had several famous YouTubers including Anthony Lee, Brandon Laatsch, Clara C, David Choi, Freddie Wong, Jen Chae Buescher(FrmHeadToToe), Mike Song, Ted Fu, Wesley Chan as players, Kevin Wu as the gamemaster named Yoshi, and Amy Okuda and Philip Wang as the hosts.

=== Everything Before Us ===
Everything Before Us is the second feature film of Wong Fu Productions. Released 23 April 2015 via Vimeo, it was directed by Philip Wang and Wesley Chan. It tells the story of two couples in the near future where the Department of Emotional Integrity (D.E.I.) issues 'relationship scores', somewhat like a credit score, that affect couples' everyday choices. With a nearly all-Asian cast, some of its stars include Aaron Yoo, Brittany Ishibashi, Brandon Soo Hoo, Victoria Park, Randall Park and Ki Hong Lee. Funding for the film was crowd-sourced from Wong Fu's fans via Indiegogo, and the film's premiere release was held at the Los Angeles Asian Pacific Film Festival.

=== Single By 30 ===
On August 24, 2016, Wong Fu Productions released its first studio-funded project Single by 30, an eight-episode web series starring Harry Shum Jr. and Kina Grannis on YouTube Red. Described by NPR as an "old-fashioned romantic comedy", the series has been praised for its highly diverse cast as it reflected the diverse population of Los Angeles, where the series is set in. The series was not renewed for a second season.

=== Just Another Nice Guy ===
On August 9, 2017, Wong Fu Productions launched a mini-series titled Just Another Nice Guy. Just Another Nice Guy, or JANG for short, is a three-episode web series and sequel to Just A Nice Guy, which was released in 2007 and was one of the company's first videos. The series stars Motoki Maxted, Piper Curda, Krista Marie Yu and Will Pacarro.

=== Yappie ===
Yappie is a five-episode video series on YouTube that addresses the modern Asian American experience and the model minority myth. Yappie is a slang term for "young Asian professional". The video series stars Philip Wang and Janine Oda, whose relationship puts them face to face with racial and social problems. Kim's Convenience star Simu Liu has a major supporting role. The series reflects Wong Fu Production's of bringing Asian American representation to the screen, while staying true to their mission of storytelling. The series is funded through the support of Patreon supporters, which is part of Wong Fu Production's new Wong Fu Forward goals to be a platform for artists and to create longer video series.

== Impact ==
Short films released by Wong Fu Productions have received, cumulatively, millions of views, and the group has several thousand fans. According to Wang, the group's website received 5,000 daily hits in 2009. He expected the audience size to grow "as online video becomes part of everyday life for the up-and-coming generation of movie-watchers" but believed that movie theaters will not become obsolete. University of Southern California digital media expert David Wertheimer also believed that "Wong Fu's use of new media to tell their community stories and build a business is the wave of the future." The group's success has allowed for growth in the popularity of Asian American comedians who promote themselves primarily through YouTube, such as Kevin Wu (KevJumba), Ryan Higa (Nigahiga), Christine Gambito (HappySlip), and David Choi. Although grateful for the group's success and popularity, Wang said, "Some people who go to film school, they'll make something great but it's only seen by like, two hundred people [...] It's kind of not fair."

In a feature by CNN, newscaster Ted Rowlands reported that Wong Fu's primary audience were "young Asian Americans who often can't find accurate depictions of themselves in mainstream media". Through its films, Wong Fu Productions hoped to break the different stereotypes of Asian Americans.

While we may not bring up [Asian Pacific American] issues in our work, we are not afraid to show that we are Asian. This is an issue in itself that we believe we're tackling head on. We want to show that APAs are just normal people, and shouldn't be stereotyped in the media and should have proper representation. We don't all do martial arts or have accents. We have stories that most everyone can relate to as human beings. We really want to show that our work and voice should and can be seen colorblind. The same way African Americans can now be accepted in the mainstream without a second guess, that's what we hope will someday be the case for APAs. - Wong Fu Productions

— Pacific Citizen

Despite this goal, Wong Fu's films were inspired by the members' life experiences rather than racial experiences. The group also does not promote political messages through their works but, rather, raises "many APA issues that we feel would fit our brand and image." They are often considered role models for Asian Americans aspiring to enter the entertainment industry. In response to this, group member Ted Fu said, "We actually didn't set out to be the 'heroes' of Asian Americans. It just happened by accident. But now that we're given this huge responsibility, almost, I feel like it's our duty to take it seriously." Wong Fu presented "one of the most antipicated workshops" on sustaining an independent production company at the 2008 Intercollegiate Taiwanese American Students Association Midwest Conference. They were also the keynote speakers at the Intercollegiate Taiwanese American Students Association 2010 West Coast Conference, which was hosted at their alma mater, UC San Diego.

In February 2012, Wang and Chan flew from Los Angeles to Malaysia for the first leg of their Southeast Asia Tour, meeting and greeting over 1000 fans, even to a point of having a live radio appearance on the radio station HITZ fm. In July 2012, Chan gave the commencement speech at UC San Diego to the graduating class. In June 2016, Philip Wang gave the commencement speech at UCSD to its graduating class.

In 2018, to continue creating content for their fans, Wong Fu created the Patreon page, Wong Fu Forward where supporters can directly fund Wong Fu Productions. By joining Patreon, Wong Fu hopes to continue its mission in storytelling, creating longer video series for their supporters on YouTube, and acting as a platform for artists.

Fans sometimes refer to actors who have appeared in Wong Fu video as part of the "Wong Fu universe", a reference to the cinematic universe employed by superhero films and how many of their alumni have gone on to star in superhero projects. Actors such as Randall Park (WandaVision), Justin H. Min (The Umbrella Academy), Anna Akana (Ant-Man), Brittany Ishibashi (Runaways), Victoria Park (The Flash) and Simu Liu (Shang-Chi and the Legend of the Ten Rings) have all previously starred in Wong Fu films prior to their appearances on their respective superhero projects.
