= Internet Icon season 2 =

Internet Icon
- Season 2
- Hosted by: Chris Riedell; Nick Riedell
- Judges: Ryan Higa; Christine Lakin; Timothy DeLaGhetto
- Winner: Matthias
- Runners-up: Bad Weather Films; The Kloons
- Finals venue: YouTube Space, Los Angeles

Release
- Original network: The YOMYOMF Network on YouTube
- Original release: 21 May – 27 July 2013

Season chronology
- ← Previous; Season 1

The second season of Internet Icon premiered on 21 May 2013, and concluded on 27 July 2013, on the YOMYOMF YouTube channel. Ryan Higa and Christine Lakin both returned as judges, and Timothy DeLaGhetto joined the judging panel for this season. Chester See did not return as host; Chris Riedell took over the role, with his brother Nick Riedell joining as mentor for the contestants. Collectively, the two are known as the Brothers Riedell, winners of the first season.

Like the previous season, there were many guest judges joining Higa, Lakin and DeLaGhetto, including Smosh, Jenna Marbles, Kassem G, Ben and Rafi Fine, Philip DeFranco, Shane Dawson and PewDiePie.

Matthew Fredrick, also known as Matthias from Los Angeles, California, won the competition, beating the runners-up Bad Weather Films and the Kloons. As the winner, he won $10,000 in cash, a MacBook Pro, a one-year development deal with YOMYOMF, and a meeting with a Hollywood film director.

== Overview ==
The second season of Internet Icon saw the runtime of each partial episode jump to half an hour. During the preliminary round that featured judges Ryan Higa, Christine Lakin, and a new judge, Tim Chantarangsu (better known as Timothy DeLaGhetto), deliberating to reach their top 10 out 100 contestants, their judgement focused on highlighting the high points of each submission video. The Brothers Riedell, winners of season 1, also joined the series as the host (Chris Riedell), and mentor (Nick Riedell).

Some of the top 10 contestants created recap videos during the release of the season's episodes. These contestants included Will Pacarro, Bad Weather Films, and The Kloons.

=== Truth Integration ===
Truth Orange is a sponsor of Internet Icon. During the broadcast of the season, Truth Orange set up a feature where viewers were able to log on and vote for their favorite contestants (excluding the top three). Will Pacarro was announced as the winner of the Fan Favorite poll during the season finale, and has a guaranteed position in the top ten of season three. Truth Orange also based an entire challenge around "ugly truths". During the Murder Mystery Challenge, the contestants had to include the fact of urea being found in urine and cigarette smoke, and that sodium hydroxide is found in hair removal products.

== Top 10 Finalists ==
=== Contestants ===
Key	Winner	Runners-up

Name / name of act	From	Position reached
Matthias (Matthew Fredrick)	Los Angeles, California	Winner
Bad Weather Films (Peter Vass and Sam Milman)	Los Angeles, California	Runners-up
The Kloons (Mitch Lewis, Greg Washburn, Nik Kazoura)	Brooklyn, New York	Runners-up
Will Pacarro	Oahu, Hawaii	4th Place
Joule Thief (Alex Goyette)	Mercer Island, Washington	5th Place
Megan Batoon	Los Angeles, California	6th Place
The Shields Brothers (Tristan and Rory Shields)	Rixeyville, Virginia	7th Place
Shama Llama (Elishama "Shama" Mrema)	Greenville, South Carolina	8th Place
Stellar Lense Productions (Orlando Gomez, Phillip Bergman, Michael Bauer, and Lisa Talley)	Fresno, California	9th Place
Anthony Ma	Los Angeles, California	10th Place

- Anthony Ma was eliminated in the first challenge.
- Stellar Lense Productions, consisting of Orlando Gomez, Phillip Bergman, Michael Bauer and Lisa Talley, were eliminated in the second challenge.
- Elishama "Shama" Mrema, better known as Shama Llama, was eliminated in the third challenge, after being in both the top three and the bottom three in the first and second challenges, respectively.
- Tristan Shields and Rory Shields, collectively known as the Shields Brothers, were eliminated in the fourth challenge.
- Megan Batoon, the final female contestant on the show and the only singular female contestant of the top 10, was eliminated in the fifth challenge.
- Alex Goyette, better known as Joule Thief, was controversially eliminated in the sixth challenge, after winning the second challenge. He was the first contestant to be eliminated that had previously won a challenge of the season.
- Will Pacarro was twice in the bottom two of the contestants, in the third and sixth challenges, and was the only contestant in the top four to not have been in the top two of a challenge. Pacarro was eliminated in the seventh challenge.
- Peter Vass and Sam Milman, better known collectively as Bad Weather Films, won the fifth challenge of the second season, and was also in the bottom two of the fourth challenge.
- Mitch Lewis, Greg Washburn and Nik Kazoura, better known collectively as The Kloons, won the first, third and sixth challenges of the second season, which is the most of all of the contestants in the season.
- Matthew Fredrick, known as Matthias, was initially in the bottom two in the first challenge, but later went on to win the fourth challenge of the season. Matthias was ultimately crowned the winner of the second season in the finale on 27 July 2013.

== Episodes ==
=== Overview ===
Episode No.	Episode	Premiere		Challenge Winner	Guest Judge
Episode No.	Episode	Part One	Part Two	Challenge Winner	Guest Judge
1	"The Top 100"	21 May 2013	23 May 2013	—	—
2	"The Next YouTube Trend Challenge"	28 May 2013	30 May 2013	The Kloons	Wesley Chan, Ted Fu, Philip Wang
3	"The Vlog/Ugly Truth Challenge"	4 June 2013	6 June 2013	Joule Thief	Philip DeFranco
4	"The How-To Challenge"	11 June 2013	13 June 2013	The Kloons	Kassem Gharaibeh
5	"The Chase Sequence Challenge"	18 June 2013	20 June 2013	Matthias	Benny and Rafi Fine
6	"The Murder Mystery Challenge"	25 June 2013	27 June 2013	Bad Weather Films	Shane Dawson
7	"The Prop Challenge"	2 July 2013	4 July 2013	The Kloons	iJustine
8	"The Trailer Challenge"	9 July 2013	11 July 2013	—	Ian Hecox Anthony Padilla; Jenna Mourey; Felix Kjellberg
9	"Finale"	27 July 2013		Matthias	—

=== Challenge One: "The Next YouTube Trend Challenge" ===
The first challenge was to create or start the next big YouTube trend. The guest judges were Wong Fu Productions, consisting of Wesley Chan, Ted Fu and Philip Wang.

Key	Winner of the Challenge	High score	Low score	Eliminated

Contestant	Video title	Finished
Anthony Ma	Ma Xiaolong	Eliminated (10th Place)
Bad Weather Films	Stashing	High Score
Joule Thief	Video Nuking	Advanced
Matthias	Trend Killer	Low Score
Megan Batoon	Trend	Advanced
Shama Llama	Wall Dancing	High Score
Stellar Lense Productions	Blasting	Advanced
The Kloons	I Love	Winner
The Shields Brothers	Shark Attack	Advanced
Will Pacarro	Spegg	Advanced

=== Challenge Two: "The Vlog/Ugly Truth Challenge" ===
The second challenge was to create a video in which a question is posed to the audience about which of two or more (possibly dubious) truths is uglier. The guest judge was Philip DeFranco.

Key	Winner of the Challenge	High score	Low score	Eliminated

Contestant	Video title	Finished
Bad Weather Films	Ugly Truth	Advanced
Joule Thief	The Westerners Water Bottle	Winner
Matthias	Which Are You	High Score
Megan Batoon	Dating	High Score
Shama Llama	Read Before You Judge	Low Score
Stellar Lense Productions	Ugly Truth	Eliminated (9th Place)
The Kloons	The More Uglier Truth	Advanced
The Shields Brothers	Ugly Truth About Brothers	Low Score
Will Pacarro	What is a Man?	Advanced

=== Challenge Three: "The How-To Challenge" ===
The third challenge is to teach a skill to the audience in a smart, creative way. The guest judge was Kassem Gharaibeh, better known as KassemG.

Key	Winner of the Challenge	High score	Low score	Eliminated

Contestant	Video title	Finished
Bad Weather Films	How to Be a Celebrity	Advanced
Joule Thief	How to Submit a Challenge Video	High Score
Matthias	How to be You	Advanced
Megan Batoon	How to All Nighters	Advanced
Shama Llama	How to Act African	Eliminated (8th Place)
The Kloons	How to Use Feng Shui in Your Patio To Improve Your Love Life	Winner
The Shields Brothers	Make Music Without Instruments	Advanced
Will Pacarro	How to be a Stereotypical Girl	Low Score

=== Challenge Four: "The Chase Sequence Challenge" ===
The fourth challenge was to create an action-packed chase sequence in honor of the release Fast & Furious 6. The guest judges were Ben and Rafi Fine.

Key	Winner of the Challenge	High score	Low score	Eliminated

Contestant	Video title	Finished
Bad Weather Films	Race	Low Score
Joule Thief	The Top Floor	Advanced
Matthias	You Scared?	Winner
Megan Batoon	White Lies	High Score
The Kloons	An Action Packed Chase Sequence	Advanced
The Shields Brothers	I'll Chase After You	Eliminated (7th Place)
Will Pacarro	The Chase	Advanced

=== Challenge Five: "The Murder Mystery Challenge" ===
The fifth challenge was to use a list of poisons and sets to create a short murder mystery film. The guest judge was Shane Dawson.

Key	Winner of the Challenge	High score	Low score	Eliminated

Contestant	Video title	Finished
Bad Weather Films	Untitled	Winner
Joule Thief	LA Studio Noir	Advanced
Matthias	T is for Torture	Advanced
Megan Batoon	Arse Nick	Eliminated (6th Place)
The Kloons	A Traditional Murder Mystery	Advanced
Will Pacarro	Death Stuff	Advanced

=== Challenge Six: "The Prop Challenge" ===
The sixth challenge was to create a video that had to contain all of the following props:, a half stick of butter, 27 marbles, a big bouncy inflatable green ball, a helmet, two swords, and a famous crawling baby. Halfway through the challenge, another prop was added; a red cape and hood. None of the other usual props from the "Iconography Room" were allowed. The guest judge is Justine Ezarik, better known as iJustine. The second part of this episode received negative reactions from viewers, quickly garnering more "dislikes" than "likes" on the video, due to the elimination of Joule Thief, something which Goyette spoke about in his Q&A presented by The YOMYOMF Network.

Key	Winner of the Challenge	High score	Low score	Eliminated

Contestant	Video title	Finished
Bad Weather Films	The Art of Foley	High Score
Joule Thief	Amy's Will	Eliminated (5th Place)
Matthias	Cause She's Hot	Advanced
The Kloons	Proportunity of a Lifetime	Winner
Will Pacarro	Advice From My Dad	Low Score

=== Challenge Seven: "The Trailer Challenge" ===
The seventh challenge is to create an original movie trailer for a movie, television show, or anything, as long it is original. This is the final challenge before the Final 3 are selected. The guest mentor is Kevin Wu, better known as KevJumba. The guest judges are Jenna Mourey (better known as Jenna Marbles), Ian Hecox and Anthony Padilla (better known collectively as Smosh), and Felix Kjellberg, better known as PewDiePie.

Key	Advanced to Finale	Eliminated

Contestant	Video title	Finished
Bad Weather Films	The Troll	Advanced
Matthias	#WheresTwitter	Advanced
The Kloons	The Second Coming	Advanced
Will Pacarro	The Exorciser	Eliminated (4th place)

=== "Finale" ===
The eighth and final challenge was to make any video that the contestants wished as a good representation of what their channel and personalities are like. They could use any location they would like, and had to finish the video within a week. Unlike the finale of the first season, where only two contestants advanced, three contestants advanced to the finale in the second season.

The finale was broadcast live on the YOMYOMF YouTube channel on 27 July 2013, from YouTube Space, Los Angeles, where Matthias was crowned the winner in front of a live audience.

Key	Winner	Runner-up

Contestant	Video title	Finished
Bad Weather Films	One-Eyed Pete & His Band of Misfits	Runner-Up
The Kloons	The Edge of Infinity	Runner-Up
Matthias	Backwards	Winner

== Elimination Chart ==
Eliminated	Low Score	Safe	High Score	Challenge Winner	Fan Favorite	Advanced To Finale	Runner-up	Winner

ELIMINATION CHART		Challenges							
ELIMINATION CHART		1	2	3	4	5	6	7	8
Place	Contestant	Result							
1	Matthias	LOW	HIGH	SAFE	WIN	SAFE	SAFE	ADV	WINNER
2 / 3 (Note: The finale only crowned Matthias as the winner, without confirming who placed second or third.)	Bad Weather Films	HIGH	SAFE	SAFE	LOW	WIN	HIGH	ADV	RUNNER; UP
2 / 3	The Kloons	WIN	SAFE	WIN	SAFE	SAFE	WIN	ADV	RUNNER; UP
4	Will Pacarro	SAFE	SAFE	LOW	SAFE	SAFE	LOW	OUT	FAN
5	Joule Thief	SAFE	WIN	HIGH	SAFE	SAFE	OUT		
6	Megan Batoon	SAFE	HIGH	SAFE	HIGH	OUT			
7	The Shields Brothers	SAFE	LOW	SAFE	OUT				
8	Shama Llama	HIGH	LOW	OUT					
9	Stellar Lense Productions	SAFE	OUT						
10	Anthony Ma	OUT							
References									
