= Internet Icon season 1 =

Internet Icon
- Season 1
- Hosted by: Chester See
- Judges: Ryan Higa; Christine Lakin
- Winner: The Brothers Riedell
- Runner-up: Lana McKissack
- Finals venue: Los Angeles Center Studios

Release
- Original network: YouTube: YOMYOMF
- Original release: 12 June – 16 August 2012

Season chronology
- Next → Season 2

Internet Icon is an American film-making competition reality television show to find "the next Internet icon". The first season aired on the YOMYOMF YouTube channel from 12 June to 16 August 2012. The judges were Ryan Higa and Christine Lakin, and the host was Chester See. The filming of the show took place at the Los Angeles Center Studios. The Brothers Riedell won the first season, with Lana McKissack as runner-up. The contestants of the first season saw an average subscriber boost of 522%.

== Top 10 Finalists ==
Key	Winner	Runner up	3rd Place

Name / name of act	From	Position reached
The Brothers Riedell (Chris and Nick Riedell)	San Francisco	Winner
Lana McKissack	Los Angeles	Runner-up
The Fu Music (Jacob and Josh Fu)	Atlanta, Georgia	3rd Place
Team Morgan (Matt Morgan and Heidi Brucker)	Sherman Oaks and Omak, Washington	4th Place
Dayside Productions (Karim, Shawn, Girard and Earl)	Queens, New York	5th Place
Kyle Hatch	Salt Lake City, Utah	6th Place
Justin James Hughes	Los Angeles, California	7th Place
Marlin Chan	Stockton, California	8th Place
Joey Held	Chicago, Illinois	9th Place
Tahir Moore	St. Louis, Missouri	10th Place

=== Details ===
- The Brothers Riedell (Nick and Chris Riedell) are from the greater San Francisco area. The duo's video, Dr. Moscow, won the brothers the first challenge and a thirty-minute head start for the following challenge. They received this benefit again after the fourth challenge. They also received this benefit in the seventh challenge, but could not use it, due to Chris Riedell having a back injury, and not being able to arrive on time. According to the judges, they have been consistently at the top throughout the competition. They were unanimously selected to move on to the finale, where they then won the first season. As of February 2013, they have over 100,000 subscribers on their YouTube channel. Following season 1, the brothers signed with Big Frame and went on to host season 2 and mentor second season contestants.
- Lana McKissack is from around the Los Angeles area. The final standalone contestant, McKissack has received praise from the judges for her comedy skills and personality. She was saved on a 2-1 vote to continue onto the finals. McKissack came second overall.
- The Fu Music (Josh and Jacob Fu) are two brothers from Atlanta, Georgia. They created what Ryan called "the best video in the competition" during the third challenge, using stop-motion animation. This led them to gain the extra 30 minute head start for the fourth challenge. They received this benefit again for the sixth challenge. They placed third overall after Ryan Higa and guest judge KassemG voted for McKissack to continue onto the finals.
- Team Morgan (Heidi Brucker and Matt Morgan) is a duo from Omak, Washington and Sherman Oaks. The duo received praise for their silent productions and physical comedy. They placed fourth overall.
- Dayside Productions (Karim, Shawn, Girard and Gru) is a group of four from the Queens area. The group caused controversy among the show's audience for excessively celebrating after being told they were in the top ten finalists. Further controversy was created when the group broke a table belonging to the Los Angeles Center Studios. In the same episode, Karim, a member of Dayside, openly wept while facing elimination in front of the judges; Lakin subsequently asked Karim why he was so emotional. More controversy was caused when Dayside caused many of the actors to complain about them. They were eliminated after turning in a video that, according to the judges, "didn't make sense". They placed fifth overall. Karim later participated in the second season of Internet Icon, making it to the top 100, but no further.
- Kyle Hatch is from Salt Lake City, Utah. Kyle caused controversy for being eliminated two episodes after Marlin Chan, a fan favorite contestant, despite being questioned by the judges as to whether or not he actually met the required challenge. He placed sixth overall.
- Justin James Hughes is from Los Angeles, California. Hughes was eliminated after not showing up for judgement on his third video due to a previous commitment. Having many fans, this caused outrage in the comment section when the video was uploaded. He placed seventh overall.
- Marlin Chan is from Stockton, California. Marlin was eliminated after the second challenge and placed eighth overall. He later participated in the second season of Internet Icon as part of a group, making it to the top 100, but no further.
- Joey Held is originally from Chicago, Illinois. Held's video How to Pour Cereal had technical problems in the preliminary round. Held later asked the producers if he could show his video on his own laptop, which was allowed. After being shown the video, Higa and Lakin retracted their earlier statements about Held's video, with Higa even saying "that [it] went from the bottom of [his] list [... to] the top.". Held was eliminated after the first challenge and placed ninth overall.
- Tahir Moore is from St. Louis, Missouri. Moore was the first to be eliminated, after being told that he was not quite technically ready. He placed tenth overall. He later hosted the main interviews of many cast and crew of YOMYOMF productions prior to the finale filming at the "Orange carpet".

== Episodes ==
=== Overview ===
Episode No.	Episode	Premiere		Challenge Winner	Guest Judge
Episode No.	Episode	Part One	Part Two	Challenge Winner	Guest Judge
1	"The Search"	12 June 2012	14 June 2012	—	—
2	"Deliberation"	19 June 2012	21 June 2012	—	—
3	"The Word Challenge"	26 June 2012	28 June 2012	Brothers Riedell	Andrew Garcia
4	"The Infomercial Challenge"	3 July 2012	5 July 2012	Justin James Hughes	Dominic "D-trix" Sandoval
5	"The Prop Challenge"	10 July 2012	12 July 2012	The Fu Music	Joe "Mystery Guitar Man" Penna
6	"The Topical Challenge"	17 July 2012	19 July 2012	Brothers Riedell	Dave Days
7	"The Judges' Choice Challenge"	24 July 2012	26 July 2012	The Fu Music	Brice Beckham & David Fickas
8	"The Set Challenge/Surprise Promotional Challenge"	31 July 2012	2 August 2012	Brothers Riedell	Jenna Marbles
9	"The Guest Star/Vlog/Music Challenge"	7 August 2012	9 August 2012	Brothers Riedell	KassemG
10	"Finale"	August 17, 2012		Brothers Riedell	—

=== Challenge One: "The Word Challenge" ===
The first challenge was to use five of ten selected words in a video. Two contestants were eliminated in this round.

Key	Winner of the Challenge	Runner up of the Challenge	High score	Low score	Bottom Four	Eliminated

Contestant	Video title	Finished
Marlin Chan	Butt Ninjas	Advanced
Dayside Productions	The Rise of the Rising Platypus	Bottom Four
The Fu Music	Learning German	Advanced
Kyle Hatch	Jacob DuShane	Low score
Joey Held	Tech Support	Eliminated (9th Place)
Justin James Hughes	On Dreams	High score
Lana McKissack	Interweb Icon	Advanced
Tahir Moore	Hiiii Yaah Doing	Eliminated (10th Place)
Team Morgan	Lecons de Performance a Matt et Heidi	Advanced
Brothers Riedell	Dr Moscow	Winner

=== Challenge Two: "The Infomercial Challenge" ===
The second challenge was to create an infomercial.

Key	Winner of the Challenge	Runner up of the Challenge	High score	Low score	Bottom Two	Eliminated

Contestant	Video title	Finished
Marlin Chan	The Fanboy	Eliminated (8th Place)
Dayside Productions	Flatulawesome	High score
The Fu Music	Lazy Fuzy	Advanced
Kyle Hatch	Nerves of Steel	Bottom Two
Justin James Hughes	Handy Bandy	Winner
Lana McKissack	Peg Arm Judy	Advanced
Team Morgan	Boozercise	Advanced
Brothers Riedell	Good Thoughts Box	Advanced

=== Challenge Three: "The Prop Challenge" ===
The third challenge was to use five selected props from the Iconography room and use them in the video. Justin James Hughes was disqualified in this round because he wasn't present at the elimination due to prior-organised filming of a television show.

Key	Winner of the Challenge	Runner up of the Challenge	High score	Low score	Bottom Two	Eliminated

Contestant	Video title	Finished
Dayside Productions	Falling For You	Advanced
The Fu Music	Coming Home	Winner
Kyle Hatch	Kyle's Imaginary Friend	Advanced
Justin James Hughes	Age of the Ignorance	Disqualified (7th Place)
Lana McKissack	Abstinence	Advanced
Team Morgan	Love Story	Advanced
Brothers Riedell	Wanna See Something	Advanced

=== Challenge Four: "The Topical Challenge" ===
The fourth challenge was to turn an article from a newspaper into a video.

Key	Winner of the Challenge	Runner up of the Challenge	High score	Low score	Bottom Two	Eliminated

Contestant	Video title	Finished
Dayside Productions	Student Loans	Low score
The Fu Music	It's All About the Mitzvah	Low score
Kyle Hatch	Kyle's Television Show	Eliminated (6th Place)
Lana McKissack	The Rocks	High score
Team Morgan	Hairline News	High score
Brothers Riedell	CSF Trifecta	Winner

=== Challenge Five: "The Judges' Choice Challenge" ===
The fifth challenge was to create a video as per chosen by the judges. Dayside Productions were challenged to make a horror video, the Fu Music had to make a video in one take - no edit cuts, Lana McKissack had to make a character-driven video in the style of a documentary, Team Morgan had to make a silent video, and the Brothers Riedell had to make an instructional video.

Key	Winner of the Challenge	Runner up of the Challenge	High score	Low score	Bottom Two	Eliminated

Contestant	Video title	Finished
Dayside Productions	Slasher's Inn	Eliminated (5th Place)
The Fu Music	There For Me	Winner
Lana McKissack	Backstage	Advanced
Team Morgan	Waiting Room	Advanced
Brothers Riedell	Human School	Advanced

=== Challenge Six: "The Set Challenge/Surprise Promotional Challenge" ===
The sixth challenge was to make a video entirely in one set (the Fu Music in the Morgue; Lana McKissack in the Bar/Restaurant; Team Morgan in the jail/interrogation room; the Brothers Riedell in the court room). However, during the challenge, the producers surprise challenged the contestants with a one-hour challenge: to make a trailer for Internet Icon.

Key	Winner of the Challenge	High score	Low score	Eliminated

Contestant	The Set Challenge video title	Finished
The Fu Music	All the Madness	Advanced
Lana McKissack	What Men Really Want	Advanced
Team Morgan	Jail Birds	Eliminated (4th Place)
Brothers Riedell	Court	Winner

=== Challenge Seven: "The Guest Star Challenge" ===
The seventh challenge was to create three videos:

- Include all of the actors in the Iconography Room, and Damien Dante Wayans.
- Make a music-based video.
- Make a vlog.

Key	Winner of the Challenge	Eliminated

Contestant	The Guest Star Challenge video title	The Music Challenge video title	The Vlog Challenge video title	Finished
The Fu Music	Toligami	A Song For You	Vlog	Eliminated (3rd Place)
Lana McKissack	The Delivery	You Choose	Vlog	Advanced
Brothers Riedell	Jail Date	This Office Space Sucks	Brothers Riedell Vlog	Winner

=== Challenge Eight: "Finale" ===
The eighth and final challenge was to make any video that the contestants wished. The winner was later announced in front of an audience, with various interviews with all Top 10 contestants.

The finale was scheduled to air 16 August 2012 at 8PM EST, but due to uploading errors it wasn't uploaded until early morning of 17 August 2012. It was sponsored by TheTruth.com.

Key	Winner	Runner-up

Contestant	Video title	Finished
Lana McKissack	Mo Babies, Mo Problems	Runner-up
Brothers Riedell	Love Transcends	Winner

== Elimination Chart ==
Disqualified	Eliminated	Low Score	Top Score	Safe	Challenge Winner	Runner-up	Winner

ELIMINATION CHART		Challenges							
ELIMINATION CHART		1	2	3	4	5	6	7	8
Place	Contestant	Result							
1	The Brothers Riedell	WIN	SAFE	SAFE	WIN	SAFE	WIN	WIN	WINNER
2	Lana McKissack	SAFE	SAFE	SAFE	HIGH	SAFE	SAFE	SAFE	2ND
3	The Fu Music	SAFE	SAFE	WIN	LOW	WIN	SAFE	OUT	
4	Team Morgan	SAFE	SAFE	SAFE	HIGH	SAFE	OUT		
5	Dayside Productions	LOW	HIGH	SAFE	LOW	OUT			
6	Kyle Hatch	LOW	LOW	SAFE	OUT				
7	Justin James Hughes	HIGH	WIN	DQ					
8	Marlin Chan	SAFE	OUT						
9	Joey Held	OUT							
10	Tahir Moore	OUT							
References									
