= Internet Icon =

- Internet Icon main title card
- Genre: Comedy video-making talent competition
- Created by: Ryan Higa
- Presented by: Chris Riedell; Chester See
- Judges: Ryan Higa; Christine Lakin; Timothy DeLaGhetto
- Original language: English
- No. of seasons: 2
- No. of episodes: 19

Production
- Executive producers: Andy Fickman; Bobby Smith, Jr.; Ryan Higa
- Production locations: Los Angeles, California
- Running time: 25–49 minutes
- Production company: YOMYOMF

Original release
- Network: YouTube
- Release: June 12, 2012 – July 27, 2013

Internet Icon is an online video-making talent competition (described as "American Idol-esque") that premiered on the YOMYOMF YouTube channel on June 12, 2012. The show was a competition between groups to see who can be "the next internet icon" or be able to run their own YouTube channel while sustaining an audience. Internet Icon was hosted by Chester See in season one and Chris Riedell in season two, and judged mainly by Ryan Higa and Christine Lakin in season one, with the addition of Timothy DeLaGhetto in the second season. Nick Riedell was also included as a mentor of the contestants in the second season. Additionally, there is also a guest judge who appears on the show each elimination episode. The contestants complete challenges at the Los Angeles Center Studios, where the show is also shot. The series is one of YOMYOMF's most popular. After two seasons, Internet Icon was cancelled, due to funding issues.

== Seasons ==
=== Season summary ===
Season	Winner	Runner-up	Host	Judges	Guest judges
One	The Brothers Riedell	Lana McKissack	Chester See	Ryan Higa; Christine Lakin	Andrew Garcia; Dominic Sandoval; Joe Penna; Dave Days; Brice Beckham & David Fickas; Jenna Mourey; Kassem Gharaibeh
Two	Matthew Fredrick (Matthias)	The Kloons; Bad Weather Films	Chris Riedell	Ryan Higa; Christine Lakin; Timothy DeLaGhetto	Wesley Chan, Ted Fu, Philip Wang; Philip DeFranco; KassemG; Ben and Rafi Fine; Shane Dawson; Justine Ezarik; Ian Hecox & Anthony Padilla; Felix Kjellberg; Jenna Mourey

=== Season One (2012) ===
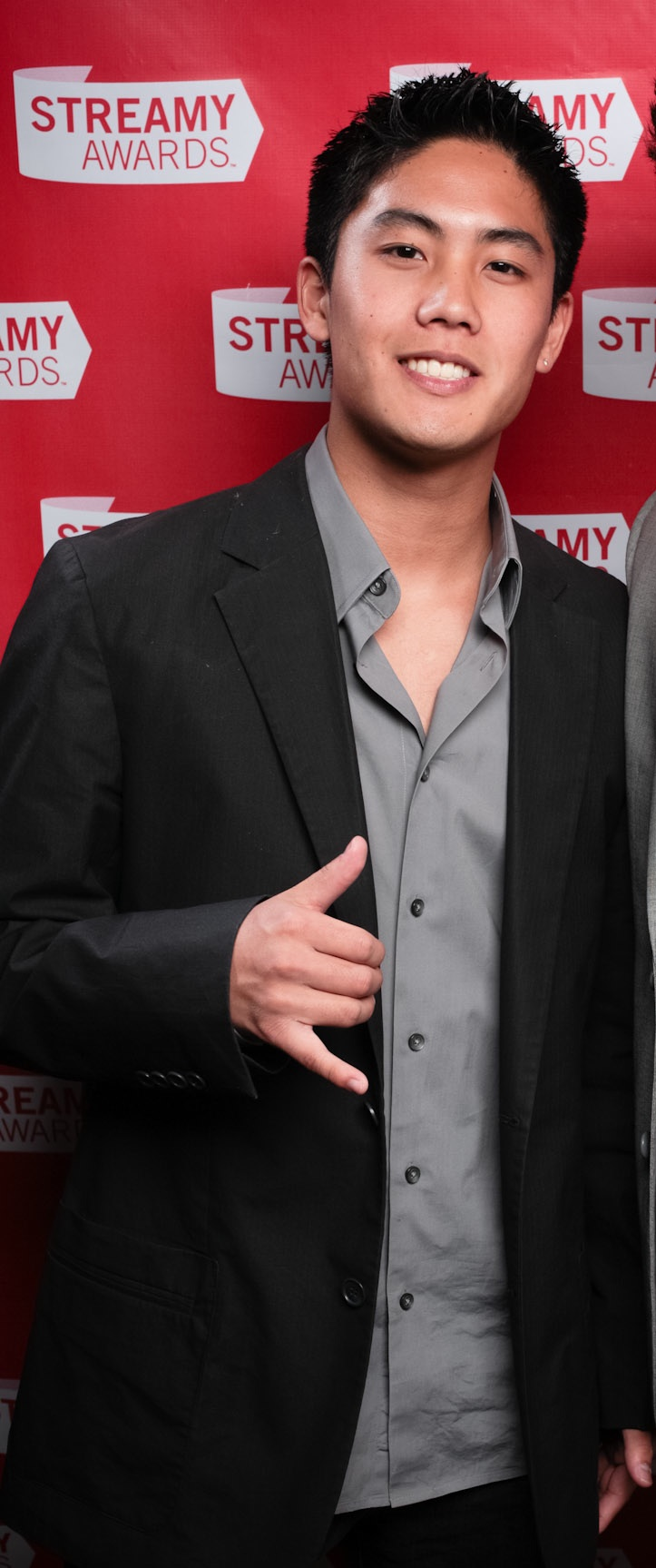
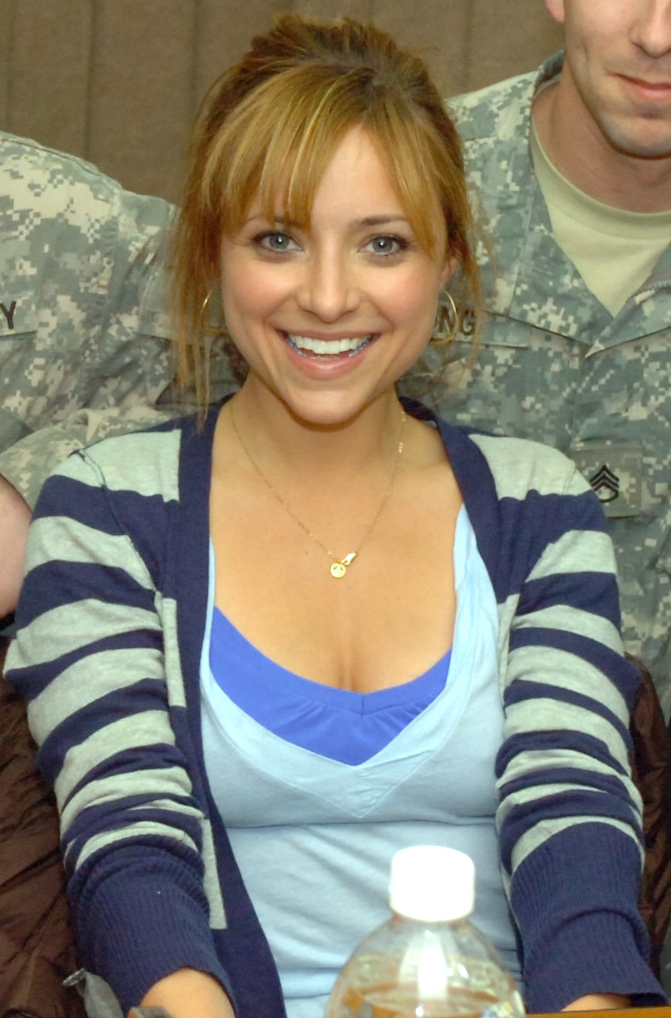
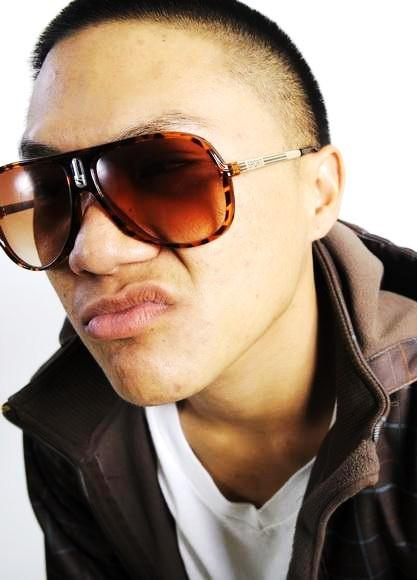
Ryan Higa and Christine Lakin judged both seasons of Internet Icon. Timothy DeLaGhetto joined in for season 2.

The first season of Internet Icon debuted on the YOMYOMF YouTube channel on June 12, 2012. It was hosted by Chester See, and judged by YouTube personality Ryan Higa and television star Christine Lakin. To audition, contestants who lived in America had to send videos in to the YOMYOMF crew, who then narrowed them down to the top 100. At the Los Angeles Center Studios, Higa and Lakin then eliminated many of those contestants to get a top ten. Those ten contestants were then due to make a new specific type of video every day until there was only two contestants left. Throughout the judging in the competition, there were various guest judges, many of which were popular YouTube personalities, including Andrew Garcia, Dominic Sandoval, Joe Penna, Dave Days, Kassem G, Jenna Marbles, Brice Beckham and David Fickas.

The final showdown was between Lana McKissack, a solo female contestant, and the Brothers Riedell, consisting of Chris and Nick Riedell, who had consistently been a favourite contestant with the judges. The Brothers Riedell ultimately won the competition, becoming the first "Internet icon".

=== Season Two (2013) ===
The second season of Internet Icon debuted on the YOMYOMF YouTube channel on May 21, 2013. Chester See was replaced as host by Chris Riedell, winner of the first season with his brother Nick Riedell, who returned as mentor to the contestants. The judging panel saw the return of Higa and Lakin, with the addition of Timothy DeLaGhetto. For the second season, contestants from America and Canada sent their videos into the YOMYOMF crew, who again narrowed it down to the top 100. However, unlike the first season, the contestants had to show an original video in front of the judges, who then immediately determined whether they would continue in the competition or would be eliminated. It was noted, that during this preliminary round of 100 contestants, the judges' comments were mostly positive, with inter-judge occurring infrequently.

After many eliminations, the judges finally narrowed the contestants down to the top 10. Like the first season, these ten contestants then went on to create different types of videos until they were narrowed down to the top three. Like the first season, there were many guest judges throughout the competition, including Wong Fu Productions, Philip DeFranco, Kassem G, the Fine Brothers, Shane Dawson, Justine Ezarik, Smosh, Jenna Marbles and PewDiePie. Justin Lin and Kevin Wu also appeared as guest mentors to the contestants.

The final showdown of the second season was between the Kloons, who had consistently impressed the judges with their humorous videos, Bad Weather Films, who had impressed the judges with their use of characters in their videos, and Matthias, who had also previously impressed the judges with his musical talent. The winner was ultimately revealed in a live finale as Matthias. GigaOM called Matthias' video "MTV-worthy."

In the second season, Truth Orange held a competition in which viewers could vote for their favourite contestant from the top ten (excluding the top three contestants), who would be guaranteed a place in the third season of Internet Icon. In the live finale, the fan favourite was revealed to be Will Pacarro, who placed fourth in the second season.

=== Cancellation ===
Season three was originally planned for 2014, with season two contestant Will Pacarro due to return with a guaranteed position within the top ten. However, in March 2014, Pacarro confirmed that the third season was cancelled, due to lack of funding.
