= Alex Goyette =

American director, writer, producer, and actor (born 1988)

- Born: Alexandre Marcel Goyette; October 5, 1988 (age 38); San Francisco, California, U.S.
- Other name: JouleThief
- Education: California State University, Northridge
- Occupations: Film director, screenwriter, YouTube personality
- Years active: 2009–present

Alexandre Marcel Goyette (born October 5, 1988) is an American filmmaker, YouTuber, actor and visual effects artist. He is known for writing, editing and directing the horror film Breeder (2026).

== Early life ==
Goyette was born on October 5, 1988 to a Canadian father and a Japanese mother. He began making films at the age of eleven, when he created a parody of Saving Private Ryan. At the age of 15 he wrote his first feature film "The Safe" and began shooting it during his sophomore year of high school.

In 2007, Goyette moved to California to pursue a career in filmmaking. He first attended Orange Coast College before transferring to California State University Northridge where he earned his Bachelor of Arts degree in Film Production.

== Career ==
Off the success of his YouTube channel, he was hired as a writer/director for AwesomenessTV creating some of their earliest comedy videos. When they were acquired by Dreamworks his teen comedy pilot was extended into a feature, Expelled (2014), which would receive a limited theatrical release with 20th Century Fox and would go on to be acquired by Netflix.

In 2026, he directed the horror film Breeder, which premiered at the Tribeca Festival on June 8, 2026. Independent Film Company and Shudder acquired the film after the premiere and was released in the United States on October 28, 2026.

== YouTube ==
Goyette created his channel, JouleTheif, on April 17, 2011 and uploaded monthly sketch comedy videos. The videos would accumulate 13 million views by July 25, 2022. Goyette also influenced Matthew Fredrick, also known as Matthias, and winner of the second season of Internet Icon, to join YouTube. The two would go on to frequently collaborate with each other, and both went on to be part of the AwesomenessTV Network.

=== AwesomenessTV ===
In early 2012, Goyette would begin working with AwesomenessTV, a YouTube channel funded by YouTube's original channel program. On his channel, Goyette directed, produced, wrote, and starred in a fake trailer centered around the Waldo character. Goyette's video Waldo The Movie -Trailer Parody [HD] gave him the opportunity to have a pitch meeting with Brian Robbins and Joe Davola of AwesomenessTV. The most viewed video he appeared in featured him dress up as an Apple Store employee, and drop boxes filled with items, in front of people waiting outside an Apple Store on the release day of the iPhone 5, giving the illusion that Goyette had broken several iPhones. The video would go on to earn over 6 million views and be covered by Today. Goyette has worked on other videos with Awesomeness, and has uploaded other prank videos as well. Goyette directed and wrote a series, Expelled, for the network, starring Nathan Kress and Teala Dunn, as part of AwesomenessTV's plan to introduce new series under DreamWorks Animation.

=== Internet Icon ===
In 2013, Goyette used his fake Waldo trailer video as a submission video for the second season of the YOMYOMF web series, Internet Icon. The video earned him a spot in the top 10 of the competition. Goyette placed fifth in the competition.

==== Overview of Internet Icon ====
No.	Video title	Challenge	Result
—	Waldo The Movie – Trailer Parody	Submission Video	Advanced
1	Video Nuking	"The Next YouTube Trend Challenge"	Advanced
2	The Westerners Water Bottle	"The Vlog/Ugly Truth Challenge"	Winner
3	How to Submit a Challenge Video	"The How-To Challenge"	High Score
4	The Top Floor	"The Chase Sequence Challenge"	Advanced
5	LA Studio Noir	"The Murder Mystery Challenge"	Advanced
6	Amy's Will	"The Prop Challenge"	Eliminated

== Filmography ==
=== Feature film ===
Year	Title	Director	Writer	Producer	Editor	Notes
2014	Expelled	Yes	Yes	Yes	No	Directorial debut
2026	Breeder	Yes	Yes	No	Yes	

=== Short film ===
Year	Title	Director	Writer	Producer	DoP	Editor	VFX Artist
2009	Lucky Day	Yes	Yes	Yes	Yes	Yes	No
2015	Close Before Midnight	Yes	Yes	Yes	No	Yes	No
2016	Rush Hour: The Next Generation	Yes	No	No	No	No	No
2017	Voltron 101	Yes	Yes	Yes	No	Yes	No
2017	Agatha	Yes	Yes	Yes	No	Yes	No
2017	Under the Stairs	Yes	Yes	Executive	No	No	No
2017	Hope Street	Yes	No	No	Yes	Yes	No
2019	BFF Buried	Yes	No	No	No	No	No
2019	Helix	No	No	No	No	No	Yes
2020	Winnebago	Yes	No	No	No	No	No
2020	Nightmare Smile	Yes	No	No	No	Yes	No
2020	Claralina	Yes	Yes	No	No	Yes	No
2020	Tomahawk	Yes	Yes	Yes	No	Yes	No
2020	Deep Breaths	Yes	Yes	No	Yes	Yes	Yes
2021	True North	No	No	No	No	No	Yes
2021	Water and Smoke	Yes	No	No	No	Yes	No
2022	Ringworms	No	No	No	No	No	Yes
