= Mark Furze =

Australian actor and singer (born 1986)

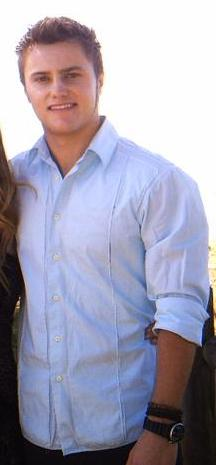
- Born: 7 May 1986 (age 40); Orange, New South Wales, Australia
- Occupations: Actor, Musician
- Years active: 1996–present
- Height: 5'11 (180 cm)
- Spouse: Laural Barrett (m. 2015)
- Children: 1

Mark Furze (born 7 May 1986) is an Australian actor and musician.

== Career ==
Furze starred in several productions by the Orange Theatre Company, playing the lead role in a version of Oliver! aged 10. His first TV appearance was in the children's television program Outriders, followed by a role in the film Balmain Boys. At the age of 14 Furze was cast in Water Rats. He appeared also in the movie Jessica as the son of the main character.

Furze was cast in his break-out role as Ric Dalby in Home and Away from September 2004, a role he played until his departure on 24 July 2008.

He took part in It Takes Two, a celebrity singing challenge, partnered with Rachael Beck. The pair came third overall. Furze appeared as a contestant on the 2007 UK TV show Soapstar Superstar, filmed in Manchester, England, finishing third in the competition behind Emmerdale's Hayley Tamaddon and Coronation Street's Antony Cotton. He was listed in Cleo magazine's annual Most Eligible Bachelors list in 2006.

He played the lead role of Cam in the interactive short film Count Me In, written and directed by Johnny Barker and Jared Kahi. Produced by Lense Flare productions as part of the Coca-Cola beach base activation in Summer 2008–2009, it was shot in New Zealand.

Furze next portrayed Trent in underworld crime series Underbelly: The Golden Mile in 2010. He also played the role of Damian in the Australian feature film A Heartbeat Away, and Dodd in the US thriller short Strays.

Furze has also played in rock bands, forming the band Falcon Road, and joining New Zealand-based Shotgun Alley in February 2011, who released three albums. He was also seen in the video clip of Guy Sebastian's single "Elevator Love" in 2006, playing bass guitar.

Furze also appeared on Season 9 of The Voice Australia in 2020, with a 4 Chair Turn in the audition and picking Team Kelly Rowland. He was eliminated in the semi-final.

== Personal life ==
Furze is married to Laural Barrett, 2007 winner of Miss New Zealand. They have one child.

== Filmography ==
=== Film ===
Year	Film	Role	Notes
2011	A Heartbeat Away	Damian	
2014	Seven Cups	Gauge	Short film
2015	Strays	Dodd	Short film
2015	Goetia	Woodrow	Short film
2016	Escape from Area 51	Warren	Short film
2016	Tell Me How I Die	Marcus	
2018	Breaking In	Peter	
2018	I Can Only Imagine	Nathan Cochran	
2026	I Can Only Imagine 2	Nathan Cochran	

=== Television ===
Year	TV series	Role	Notes
2001	Water Rats	Jared	Episode: "Red Ice"
2001	Outriders	Jake Konrad	Recurring role, 26 episodes
2003	Balmain Boys	The Kid	TV film
2004	Jessica	Joey (Aged 16)	TV film
2004–2008	Home and Away	Ric Dalby/Eric Dalby	Main cast
2010	Underbelly	Trent	Episodes: "The Crucible" & "Kingdom Come"
2020	The Voice Australia	Contestant	Team Kelly Rowland. Eliminated in semi-final
2021	Harrow	Ruben	Episode: "Per Stirpes"
