= Jun Sung Ahn =

South Korean musical artist and YouTuber

Jun Sung Ahn 안준성
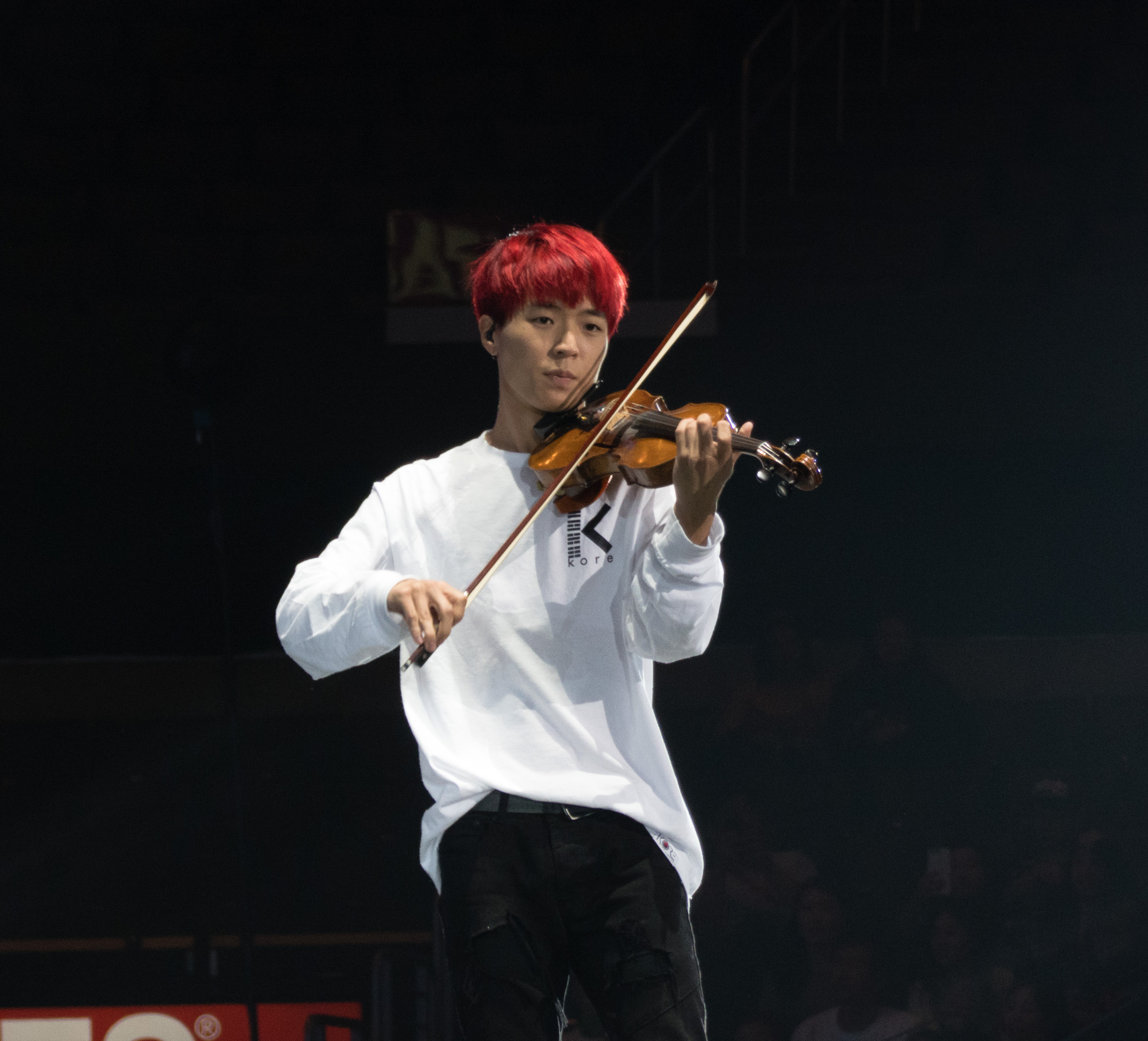
- Performing at KCON LA 2016, July 30.

Background information
- Also known as: Jun Curry Ahn
- Born: February 18, 1993 (age 33); Seoul, South Korea
- Origin: Princeton Junction, New Jersey
- Genres: Pop; K-pop; classical
- Occupations: Violinist; producer; dancer
- Instruments: Violin; piano; guitar; vocals
- Years active: 2011–present
- Label: Independant
- Member of: BgA
- Website: www.juncurryahn.com

Jun Sung Ahn or Ahn Jun-sung (Korean: 안준성; born February 18, 1993), better known by his stage name Jun Curry Ahn, is a South Korean musician, YouTube video producer and member of BgA. He is a classically trained violinist who is known for his 2012 violin and dance cover performance of Psy's Gangnam Style on his YouTube channel and other K-pop and pop music covers.

== Early life ==
Ahn was born in South Korea and moved to West Windsor, New Jersey in the third grade of elementary school. He started playing classical violin in fifth grade, performing in competitions and recitals. He said he chose the violin because it was versatile and its sounds and characteristics matched his personality. He also stated on Ryan Higa's podcast, Off The Pill, that his childhood friend, Harrison, was also a reason why he picked violin as an instrument. Harrison would play violin during their play dates, which sparked enough jealousy in Ahn to ask his mother about lessons. He looks up to his sister as an influence and said, "She is the smartest, most caring, silly person I know, and I always strive to be just like her." He said he had a phase in middle school when he admired his mother's cooking and watched the cooking channel after school, thinking that he would like to be a chef, and enjoys making her spaghetti aglio e olio and his favorite kimchi soup. He describes his father as "the best father, mentor, role model, friend" and his "#1 fan".

Later in college, despite majoring in radio/TV/film, and not music, he joined Northwestern University's orchestra and participated in the Asian-concentrated dance crew, 'Refresh'. By his sophomore year in 2012, he no longer studied violin formally, but continued to play, and described himself as a mediocre pianist and a beginning guitarist.

== Career ==
=== 2011–2013: "Gangnam Style" and other YouTube covers, collaboration ===
In July 2011, he started recording and publishing violin covers of pop songs on YouTube, under the pseudonym Jun Curry Ahn, with the "Curry" middle name being a play on his ethnicity. In about sixteen months, he had 17 million views and 130,000 subscribers, with covers including Adele's "Skyfall", Taylor Swift's "Red", Bad Meets Evil's "Lighters" and Lil Wayne's "How to Love". He has collaborated with other YouTube artists such as Arden Cho and Sungha Jung, and with his university's dance crew Refresh for a vocal, dance and violin cover of Big Bang’s, "Blue".

On July 7, 2012, he won the annual Kollaboration Chicago award with a performance that combined violin and the Chinese yo-yo, and later competed at the Kollaboration Star Finale in Los Angeles in the fall of the same year. Also, in July 2012, his dance and violin cover of Psy’s "Gangnam Style", which he published a few weeks after the original, soon reached more than 2.4 million views, and won first place in a competition Psy held in South Korea. He 'cloned' himself in the video to appear dancing and playing the violin at the same time.

On September 13, 2013, he reported as an MNET America intern.

=== 2014–2015: "Let It Go" cover, first KCON LA and NY performances ===
On August 9, 2014, he was a special guest at KCON LA's convention, and performed at the Los Angeles Memorial Sports Arena as one of the opening acts for idols VIXX, IU, B1A4, Teen Top and G-Dragon; a violin cover of Taeyang's "Eyes, Nose, Lips" and a dance cover of BEAST's "Good Luck".

Ahn performed on the main stage at California food festival 626 Night Market on August 16, 2014, along with musician Joseph Vincent.

On October 12, 2014, his music career and Korean heritage were featured on Epicurious "Community Table" by contributors Malek Shaparak and Anne Goetz, with a recipe called "Good Luck Tomato Kimchi Soup."

By the fall of 2014, during his senior year at Northwestern University, he had more than 500,000 YouTube subscribers, over 7 million individual views and his most popular video, a cover of "Let It Go" had more than 3.8 million views. Also, in November, Asia Pacific Arts' Mai Nguyen said his Taylor Swift cover of Shake It Off "...remakes the music video with his own twist. While playing the upbeat pop song on his violin, Jun Sung shows off his comedic side in his attempts to perform martial arts and Indian dance".

On August 2, 2015, he performed with opening acts at the Staples Center at KCON LA, preceding K-pop acts Red Velvet, AOA, Block B, Zion.T, Crush and Shinhwa. On August 8, 2015, he opened for the first KCON New York for VIXX, AOA, Teen Top and Girls' Generation.

=== 2016: BgA, KCON NY and LA, YouTube Fanfest ===
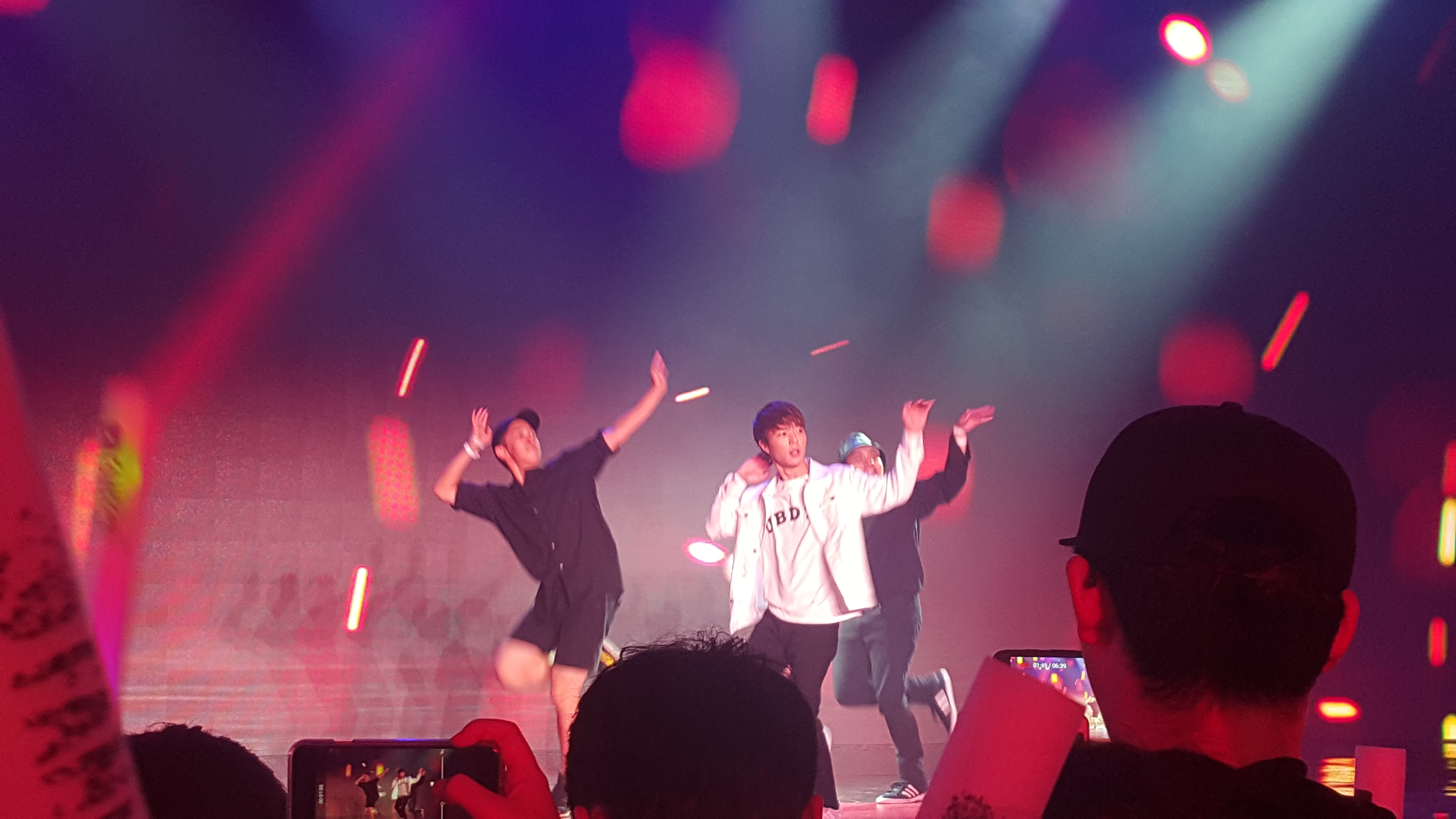
YouTube FanFest Korea 2016, September 2, Seoul.

On May 13, he and BGA members, YouTuber Ryan Higa, musician David Choi, filmmaker Philip Wang and actor Justin Chon, released a parody K-pop song and music video "Dong Saya Dae", which recorded a million views the first day of its release. In the video, his persona was "Jeungri", an "aspiring YouTuber and actual K-pop star".

On June 25, at KCON NY, he performed K-pop covers on the Prudential Center stage as an opening for popular idol acts, including Mamamoo, Eric Nam, Ailee, Day6 and BTS. Fuse's Jeff Benjamin said, "The crowd particularly enjoyed his cover of BTS' 'Save Me,' that saw Ahn dancing a bit during the breakdown." Benjamin said he shared the praise he received from BTS on a Twitter post, "Rap Monster just came up to me and said my performance was amazing and that the BTS members have seen my videos. I'M DEAD."

On July 30, he performed BTS' "Save Me" at KCON LA's pre-show at the Staples Center before larger acts I.O.I, DEAN, Amber, GFriend, Block B, Turbo, and SHINee, and held a "meet-and-greet" at the convention. On August 4, 2016, while reporting chart news, Billboard's Trevor Anderson mentioned his performance at KCON LA and his nearly 1 million YouTube subscribers. Anderson accounted his Twitter posting of the popular cover of BTS' "Butterfly" for boosting the song to a re-entry on the Billboard Twitter Top Tracks Chart at Number 2, along with a cover by singer Lucia.

On September 2, he participated with eleven other star YouTubers in the YouTube FanFest in Seoul.

=== 2017: Harry Potter collaboration, KCON Mexico ===
In February, a Harry Potter medley he performed with Albert Chang, Baiyu Li and Lily Ki in January was featured on New York Public Radio and called a "sweet concoction of the themes and motifs that fans of the franchise have come to love, arranged for two violins, cello and piano," by WQXR-FM's James Bennett II.

In March he was a guest participant at the inaugural KCON Mexico festival on the 17–18, which had an attendance of 33,000. On March 16, Ahn featured in a skit titled "My K-Pop Boyfriend" by Wong Fu Productions, acting in his Boys Generally Asian persona Jeungri. On March 24, he appeared in a second BGA YouTube K-pop parody video release, "Who's It Gonna Be", which received over six million views within a few days.

=== 2018: solo debut ===
On August 3, he released his MV "Hold it Down".

== Artistry ==
He has described his violin style as "slightly playful", because of the enjoyment he has as he plays and listens to music, hoping to share the same with his audience. In 2012, he said because he covers many vocal songs, he tries to use his violin to bring out the same human feel and tones, listening to the song for a few days and playing by ear as he practices for the final recording. Rather than creating a "perfect" music, he finds it important to include his personal feelings and emotions to create a story with the music, that his audience identifies as his own.

He described his YouTube work as building a portfolio, with his passion for film portrayed in his violin playing, and with each video having a cinematic quality.

== Discography ==
Title	Year	Peak chart positions		Album
Title	Year	US world	KOR	Album
Hold it down	2018			Non album-singles
Admit	2019			LIMBO Mini Album
Limbo	2019			LIMBO Mini Album
Switch	2019			LIMBO Mini Album
REM (ft. Moon Jong-up)	2019			LIMBO Mini Album
