= Matt Shively =

American actor (born 1990)

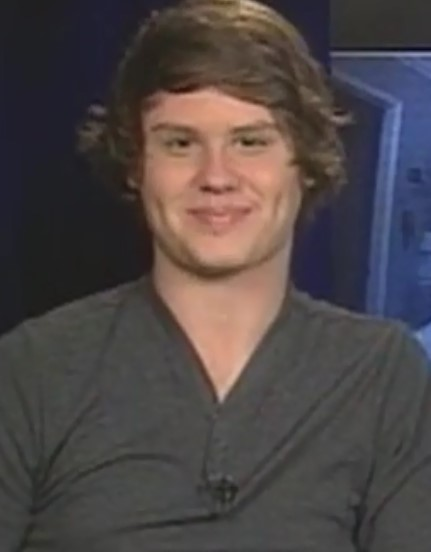
- Shively in 2012
- Born: Matthew James Shively Jr. September 15, 1990 (age 35); Hanford, California, U.S.
- Occupation: Actor
- Years active: 2005–present

Matthew James Shively Jr. (born September 15, 1990) is an American actor best known for his role as Ryan Laserbeam on the Nickelodeon television series True Jackson, VP. Beginning in June 2011, he began appearing on two more Nickelodeon shows: Winx Club as Sky and The Troop as Kirby. He co-starred in the ABC television program The Real O'Neals which debuted on March 8, 2016.

== Early life ==
Shively was born in Hanford, California. He became interested in acting in the fourth grade after seeing Shia LaBeouf on the television program Even Stevens, and LaBeouf remains his inspiration for acting. He has been a long-time fan of the Canadian television show Degrassi: The Next Generation. He also had a band with his good friend Sterling Knight named Connecting Channels.

== Career ==
Shively had a minor part in the 2007 film Rattle Basket, and another small part on an episode of Zoey 101. He auditioned several times for the part of Ryan on True Jackson, VP, and was told he didn't get it. He was called back two weeks later, tested for the role, and won the part. The show received positive reviews. He voiced Crown Prince Sky on Nickelodeon's Winx Club and in two movies based on the series: Winx Club: The Secret of the Lost Kingdom and Winx Club 3D: Magical Adventure. Shively joined the cast of The Troop in its second (and final) season as the character Kirby Bancroft-Cadworth III.

Shively's film career began in 2011, when he was cast in a minor role in the horror comedy April Apocalypse. Shively played one of the leads in the horror film Paranormal Activity 4. The film was released October 18, 2012. Justin Lowe, writing for the Associated Press, called Shively "likable enough", while generally panning the film. Rafer Guzman of Newsday agreed. Andy Webster of the New York Times found Shively's performance "delightful" and generally praised the picture. Shively co-starred in the comedy Noobz, which was released in theaters in late January 2013. He played one of four geeky friends who attempt to win a video gaming contest.

Shively also appeared the independent feature film Bucky and the Squirrels, a 2014 mockumentary directed by Allan Katz about a wacky 1960s psychedelic rock band whose airplane crashes in snowy mountains. Frozen alive, the band is thawed out in the 21st century. Shively also had a leading role in the 2014 film Expelled as the main character's best friend, Danny.

Shively co-starred in the ABC television program The Real O'Neals, which debuted on March 2, 2016. Shively portrayed 17-year-old Jimmy O'Neal. Shively won significant praise from reviewer Sheri Linden for his performance in the 2016 coming-of-age film Summer of 8, and teamed with fellow former Nickelodeon star Jennette McCurdy in the short horror-comedy film 8 Bodies in 2017.

== Personal life ==
Shively was in a relationship with actress Ashley Newbrough.

== Filmography ==
=== Films ===
Year	Title	Role	Notes
2005	The Tomb	Nathan	
2010	I Owe My Life to Corbin Bleu	Cool Guy	Short film
2011	Took a Bullet	Bill	Short film
2012	Winx Club: The Secret of the Lost Kingdom	Prince Sky	Nickelodeon English version, voice
2012	Barrio Tales	Trevor	Executive producer
2012	Noobz	Oliver	
2012	Paranormal Activity 4	Ben	
2013	Winx Club 3D: Magical Adventure	Prince Sky	Nickelodeon English version, voice
2013	April Apocalypse	Terry	
2013	Feels So Good	Zack	
2014	Bucky and the Squirrels	Phil	
2014	Expelled	Danny	
2014	How to Build a Better Boy	Bart Hartley	Disney Channel Original Movie
2015	She	Nick	Short film
2016	Summer of 8	Oscar	
2016	Underwater Upside Down	Tucker	
2017	8 Bodies	Sam	Short film
2017	Power Rangers	Damo	
2018	Father of the Year	Larry	
2019	The Wedding Year	Alex	
2021	Mark, Mary & Some Other People	AJ	
2021	Unknown Dimension: The Story of Paranormal Activity	Himself	Documentary film

=== Television ===
Year	Title	Role	Notes
2008	Zoey 101	Angry guy	Episode: "Anger Management"
2008–2011	True Jackson, VP	Ryan Laserbeam	Main role; 58 episodes
2009–2010	BrainSurge	Self	3 episodes
2011–2013	The Troop	Kirby Cadworth-Bankcroft III	7 episodes
2012	Last Man Standing	Elliot	Episode: "Take Your Daughter to Work"
2012	Never Fade Away	The Other #2	Episode: "Mockingbird"
2012	Sidewalks Entertainment	Himself	Episode: "Kathryn & Matt"
2012	Bucket and Skinner's Epic Adventures	Lt. Collns	2 episodes
2011–2014	Winx Club	Sky	Voice; main role
2014	Teen Wolf	Oliver	Episode: "Echo House"
2014	CSI: Crime Scene Investigation	Jacob Baker	Episodes: "Keep Calm and Carry-On", "The Fallen"
2014	What's Next for Sarah?	Jack Cromwell	1 episode
2014–2015	Jessie	Hudson	Episodes: "Where's Zuri?", "Basket Case", "Capture the Nag"
2015	Resident Advisors	Mike Shelton	Episodes: "Sexiled", "Alcohol Awareness"
2015	Aquarius	Dave Vitrano	Episode: "Home Is Where You're Happy"
2016–2017	The Real O'Neals	Jimmy O'Neal	Main role
2017	SMILF	Store Clerk	Episode: "Deep-Dish Pizza & a Shot of Holy Water"
2018–2019	Santa Clarita Diet	Christian	4 episodes
2018	#TheResident	TJ Chioffi	Episode: "And The Nurses Get Screwed"
2019	Grand Hotel	Nelson	Episodes: "Smokeshow, The Big Sickout"
2019–2020	American Housewife	Lonnie Spears	6 episodes
2019	Adam Ruins Everything	Dominic	Episode: "Adam Ruins Cops"
2019	The Purge	Turner	7 episodes
2021	Total Badass Wrestling	Nate	Main cast
2022	Players	Frugger	Recurring role
2022–2025	Lopez vs Lopez	Quinten	Main role
