= Laural Barrett =

New Zealand model

- Born: 18 December 1986 (age 39); Christchurch, New Zealand
- Occupations: Model; singer; beauty queen

Laural Barrett (born 18 December 1986) is a New Zealand model, singer and beauty pageant titleholder who was an entrant in Miss Universe 2007 as the winner of the Miss New Zealand contest. She has also appeared in the New Zealand reality TV show Island Wars.

== Personal ==
Barrett was born in Christchurch to Neville and Niki Barrett, with sisters Kristal and Sharaine, her twin. Laural and Sharaine used to sing together under the name "Gemini Twinz." Barrett married actor/musician Mark Furze in Las Vegas in 2015. They have one daughter.

In 2024 Laural and twin sister Sharaine started the podcast "Can't Handle the Crime and Scandal".
