= Breeder (film) =

- Theatrical release poster
- Directed by: Alex Goyette
- Written by: Alex Goyette
- Produced by: Ian Start; Byron Ashley; Brian Mitchell; Chris Wilkinson; K. Asher Levin; Bill Keenan
- Starring: Daniel Doheny; Dot-Marie Jones; Maddie Phillips; Tanaya Beatty
- Cinematography: Jaryl Lim
- Edited by: Alex Goyette
- Music by: Hannah Parrott
- Production companies: Rabbits Black; Hadron Films; Mitchell & Start; Four J Films
- Distributed by: Independent Film Company; Shudder
- Release dates: June 6, 2026 (Tribeca Festival); October 28, 2026 (United States)
- Running time: 97 minutes
- Countries: Canada; United States
- Language: English
- Box office: $808,063

Breeder is a 2026 horror film written, edited, and directed by Alex Goyette. It stars Daniel Doheny, Dot-Marie Jones, Maddie Phillips, and Tanaya Beatty.

Breeder premiered at the Tribeca Festival on June 6, 2026, and was released in the United States by Independent Film Company and Shudder on October 28, 2026.

== Plot ==
MIT student Russell leaves academia to pursue research to address the decline of bee populations. He struggles to secure funding for his project until wealthy miniature poodle breeder Patti Kolb offers him support. After researching Patti with his fiancée Haley, Russell travels to her remote property to discuss the arrangement.

Over dinner, Patti introduces Russell to five women she calls her daughters: Ainsley, Cosette, Celeste, Manon, and Yara. Patti then reveals that she intends to extend her dog-breeding practices to humans, believing that selective reproduction can produce genetically superior offspring, and wants Russell to mate with Ainsley in exchange for a blank check to finance his project. Disturbed, Russell retreats to his car. Ainsley follows him and proposes that she fake a pregnancy in exchange for splitting the money so she can finally afford to leave the property; after some deliberation, Russell tentatively agrees. That night, he briefly goes outside past his designated curfew to answer a call from Haley; Patti confiscates his phone in retaliation.

The following night, Russell and Ainsley feign having sex, after which Ainsley reveals that she and the other girls have been forced to give birth to many children, which Patti subsequently sells on the black market. While searching for his phone in Patti's room, Russell finds files containing his personal information, as well as files on other men. Patti catches him and reveals that she extensively researched both him and Haley, and thus knows of Haley's infertility.

Concerned by Russell's lack of communication, Haley contacts the police. A naked man, whom Cosette identifies as "the other stud," runs from the barn. Patti instructs Russell to retreat to his room, but Russell instead watches Patti and the other girls kill the man from the window. Noticing him, Patti furiously orders him and Ainsley upstairs and demands that they mate again, declaring that she will watch this time. Before they can proceed, a police officer arrives to search the house. Cosette shoots Russell with a tranquilizer dart, then positions herself on top of his naked, unconscious body to make it appear as though they are having sex when the officer enters the room. Flustered, the officer apologizes and leaves. Patti subsequently locks Russell in a holding cell containing many sperm sample cups, promising to free him once all have been filled. Russell attempts to convince her he is not actually genetically superior, citing the anxiety disorder he has struggled with his entire life, but Patti is unmoved, threatening to kill him if he does not comply. She also reveals that she acquired all of her "daughters" through adoption and carefully selected each of them for perceived superior characteristics.

Haley arrives and breaks into the barn, but leaves distraught after Patti convinces her that Russell has fallen in love with Ainsley and run away with her to Montreal. After months, Ainsley attempts to free Russell. Patti catches her and locks her in a freezer adjacent to the cell. Communicating through an air duct, Ainsley reveals that she successfully got pregnant from one of Russell's sperm samples and gave birth to a girl. The following morning, Ainsley freezes to death. Russell stages a suicide; when Yara opens the door to collect his body, he fatally stabs her with a wooden stake before escaping the cell. He flees into a room containing several babies in cribs, where Patti confronts him at gunpoint. Russell pushes his daughter's crib aside. When Patti rushes to save it, Russell kicks her off a ledge before aiming her gun at her, but hesitates to shoot when she reminds him of her initial promise of granting him unlimited funding for his research.

Some time later, Russell, his project now fully funded, delivers a speech to an audience; a wheelchair-bound Patti is in attendance. Russell and Haley have resumed their relationship and begun couples counseling, as Russell has not divulged the truth behind his capture and instead let Haley believe his affair with Ainsley actually happened. They have also adopted Russell's daughter and named her Ainsley, though Russell keeps the nature of her conception a secret as well.

== Cast ==
- Dot-Marie Jones as Patti
- Daniel Doheny as Russell
- Maddie Phillips as Ainsley
- Tanaya Beatty as Haley
- Paige McGarvin as Cosette
- Charlotte Kavanagh as Celeste
- Lillian Doucet-Roche as Yara
- Isla Spencer as Manon
- Carmen Moore as Angela
- Rochelle Greenwood as Cindy
- Jillian Fargey as the Couples Therapist
- John Murphy as Officer Morgan
- Tegan Bradlee Arychukas as Ainsley
- Jen Araki-Playfair as the Scientist
- Guy Christie as the Interviewer

== Production ==
Principal photography began on February 18, 2025 in Vancouver, Canada. In April 2026, the film was selected to screen at the Tribeca Festival.

== Release ==
Breeder premiered at the Tribeca Festival on June 8, 2026. In June 2026, Independent Film Company and Shudder acquired the distribution rights, for a fall 2026 release. It was screened in the Panorama section of the 59th Sitges Film Festival on October 13, 2026. The film was released in the United States by Independent Film Company and Shudder on October 28, 2026. The film was previously scheduled to release on October 16, 2026.

== Reception ==
On the review aggregator website Rotten Tomatoes, 88% of 40 critics' reviews are positive, with an average rating of 6.6/10.
