= Boys Generally Asian =

K-pop parody group

Background information
- Origin: Los Angeles, California, U.S.
- Genres: Novelty, K-pop
- Years active: 2016–2018 (indefinite hiatus)
- Members: Ryan Higa; Justin Chon; Philip Wang; David Choi; Jun Sung Ahn

Boys Generally Asian, also known by the acronym BgA, is an American K-pop parody group that was created by YouTube personality Ryan Higa. The group, which describes itself as "guys who can't sing, dance or really speak Korean", debuted in 2016 with the single, "Dong Saya Dae". In addition to Higa, the group consists of actor Justin Chon, filmmaker Philip Wang, and musicians David Choi and Jun Sung Ahn.

== History ==
=== 2016: "Dong Saya Dae" ===
BgA debuted in May 2016 with the song "Dong Saya Dae" (Korean: 똥 싸야 돼; RR: Ttong Ssaya Dwae; lit. '"I Need to Poop"'), which peaked at number 2 on the iTunes K-pop chart.

To accompany the song, the group released other content that K-pop groups typically release, including teaser images, a music video (which was directed by Wong Fu Productions), and a choreography music video. As part of their image, the members of BgA based their stage names on the names of the members of K-pop boy band Big Bang.

=== 2017: "Who's It Gonna Be" ===
In March 2017, BgA released their second single, "Who's it Gonna Be", which reached number 1 on the iTunes K-pop chart. The song also charted on two Billboard charts, reaching number 3 on the World Digital Song Sales chart and number 33 on the Spotify Viral 50 chart.

=== 2018–present: Hiatus and in production ===
On July 28, 2019, the YouTube channel Nigahiga posted a podcast that announced plans for a BgA movie. They also stated that R.O.P. and Daeyang wrote another song for BgA but have yet to record it. P-Dragon now appears in episodes on Wong Fu's YouTube channel, most recently in "My Office Became a K-Drama". An Instagram post to Wang's page also stated that the group was in an "Indefinite hiatus".

== Members ==
- R.O.P. (Ryan Higa)
- P-Dragon (Philip Wang)
- Daeyang (David Choi)
- J-Lite (Justin Chon)
- Jeungri (Jun Sung Ahn)

== Discography ==
=== Singles ===
Title	Year	Peak chart positions	Album
Title	Year	US World	Album
"Dong Saya Dae" (똥싸야돼)	2016	7	Non-album singles
"Who's It Gonna Be"	2017	3	Non-album singles
