= Sickhouse =

- Directed by: Hannah Macpherson
- Written by: Hannah Macpherson
- Produced by: Jacob Avnet; Hannah MacPherson; Kip Pastor; Clay Reed; Andrea Russett
- Starring: Andrea Russett; Laine Neil; Sean O'Donnell
- Cinematography: Delaney Teichler
- Edited by: Michael Swingler
- Production company: Indigenous Media
- Release dates: April/May 2016 (Snapchat): June 1, 2016 (VOD)
- Running time: 68 minutes
- Country: United States
- Language: English

Sickhouse is a 2016 thriller that was written and directed by Hannah Macpherson and starring YouTube personality Andrea Russett. The film was initially released between April 29 and May 3, 2016, on the instant image messaging mobile app Snapchat via Russett's account in one to ten second increments in the mobile 9:16 vertical orientation. On June 1, 2016, the film's production company, Indigenous Media, released a 68-minute full length version that was released to VOD. This version of Sickhouse utilized the clips released to Snapchat, which made up the bulk of the film, as well as new, additional material.

The film's plot centers around Russett, who ventures to a supposedly haunted cabin named "Sickhouse" with her fictitious cousin, and two social media addicts, in an attempt to investigate its lore. The actors for Sickhouse improvised most of their dialogue as the movie was filmed in real time on Snapchat. Since the movie's release, Sickhouse has been compared to the 2014 horror movie Unfriended, for its usage of social media as a storytelling technique, and the 1999 film The Blair Witch Project, for its similar premise.

Due to the film's popularity online, a sequel to the film was greenlit in July 2016.

== Plot ==
The film begins with Snapchat personality Andrea Russett announcing to her followers that her cousin Taylor was flying to visit her for the weekend. This coincides with a Twitter request she had received from Sean O'Donnell, who wants Andrea to visit a supposedly haunted cabin called "Sickhouse". Once Taylor arrives the two women bond and Andrea teaches her cousin to use her Snapchat, which Taylor uses to publish a video of Andrea sleeping, the first of many videos posted by Taylor throughout the film.

The next day Andrea discovers death threats on her cousin's Facebook page, revealing that Taylor actually came to Los Angeles to escape a dire situation back at home. The subject then changes to the Sickhouse and the two read a website that explains the legend of the home and the Sickwife who lived there. They also run into two of Andrea's fans, who ask to take a picture with her. Infatuated with her cousin's life and freedom, Taylor decides that she wants to remain with Andrea forever. Later that night the two cousins attend a house party with Sean and two others, Lukas and JC. Lukas, who has visited Sickhouse before, goes over the rules of the Sickhouse: don't make noise, never go inside, and always leave a gift. During the party, Taylor silently observes Sean and Andrea discussing her before sharing a kiss, which upsets Taylor.

The group sets out for the Sickhouse the following day despite warnings from local residents to stay away. As they grow closer to the cabin Taylor continues to broadcast using Andrea's account, growing irritated when others try to use their phones to document the trip. The group also runs into the two fans again, which Andrea dismisses as a coincidence. After they make it to the woods the group decides to camp out and Andrea has sex with Sean while Taylor loses her virginity to Lukas. The following day they continue to follow clues leading to the Sickhouse and discover the cabin and its altar of gifts. Andrea follows the rules and leaves a gift, however both Lukas and Taylor decide to steal gifts. Lukas drinks from his stolen flask and becomes violently ill and during the night the group is terrorized by strange noises and faint images of the “Sickwife.

The following morning Taylor sends out a broadcast on her own, stating that she would "do anything to not go home". The group return to the Sickhouse to replace the stolen gifts, only for Taylor to run inside. Sean decides to follow her, leaving Andrea and Lukas to wait outside. Soon after Taylor runs out of the house and the door slams shut behind her. The trio runs away leaving Sean behind, only to see a woman in a wedding dress walking through the woods. They return to the house and split up in order to find Sean. They instead find the two fans, one of whom is dressed as the Sickwife. They start to explain that they were just pranking them, only for the two to start becoming uncontrollably sick. As Taylor runs from the house the viewer is shown Sean and Lukas lying sick on the ground, with the latter pleading for help; Andrea is then snatched out of view. Taylor is knocked unconscious and the phone drops to the ground, where it records for a little while longer.

When she wakes Taylor decides to continue sending out snaps despite having no cellphone reception, in the hopes that once the reception returns the videos will upload and someone will send the police to save them. While wandering through the house she finds Lukas. Taylor also believes that she can hear Andrea in the basement and goes to look for her, even as Lukas begs her not to go. In the basement Taylor finds dead bodies and a wedding dress on a hanger. Right before a fade to black, the viewer is shown a glimpse of the "Sickhusband". After the fade the viewer is shown Taylor humming happily as she drifts further into the basement. Suddenly a hand appears on her shoulder, to which she says, "I'm home" into the camera.

Ultimately, the fates of Sean, Lukas, Andrea, and the two fans are left unclear to the audience.

== Cast ==
- Andrea Russett as herself
- Laine Neil as Taylor
- Sean O'Donnell as himself
- Lukas Gage as himself

== Reception ==
Vulture reviewed the finished version of the movie, writing that "While Sickhouse is certainly not Blair Witch, it does suggest that the next horror film that will grab hold of the national consciousness could take some version of this form. The dynamic of watching and being watched is fear in its simplest form, and social media is that dynamic played out on a grand scale every second of every day."
