= Tell Me How I Die =

- Film poster
- Directed by: D. J. Viola
- Screenplay by: James Hibberd; Rob Warren Thomas; D.J. Viola
- Story by: James Hibberd
- Produced by: Andrew Alter; Scott Benson; Derek Goldberg; Jack Heston; Scott Prisoned; Kenny Solomon; Christopher Ursitti; D.J. Viola
- Starring: Virginia Gardner; Nathan Kress; Kirby Bliss Blanton; Ryan Higa; Mark Furze; Ethan Peck; Mark Rolston; William Mapother
- Cinematography: David McGrory
- Edited by: Marc Bach
- Music by: José Villalobos
- Production companies: Big Block Media Holdings; Base Station; Supergravity Pictures; Culprit Creative
- Distributed by: ITN Distribution
- Release dates: September 16, 2016 (Digital); January 2, 2018 (DVD)
- Running time: 107 minutes
- Country: United States
- Language: English

Tell Me How I Die is a 2016 American horror film directed, produced, and co-written by D.J. Viola. The film stars Nathan Kress, Virginia Gardner, Kirby Bliss Blanton, Ryan Higa, Mark Furze, Ethan Peck, Mark Rolston and William Mapother. The film follows a group of college students who undergo a clinical drug trial, testing a memory enhancement drug. The side effects they soon experience shows them premonitions of their deaths.

== Plot ==
The film opens with a man at home looking at drawings. He leaves his family in the house and commits suicide outside. One of the drawings is revealed to say "Kill yourself or I kill them all."

In a speech, Dr. Layton introduces the concept of A9913, a memory-enhancing drug created by Hallorann Pharmaceuticals. The drug is able to give individuals full memory recall, allowing them to fully relive their past memories. He meets with Dr. Jerrems, who has been working on the A9913 drug.

Eighteen young adults, including Anna, and Den have been recruited to take part in the clinical trial. Dr. Jerrems informs them that it is a Phase 3 trial for A9913 and that all of the participants will be residing in the building until the trial is completed so that they can be monitored.

Anna meets participants Kristen and Scratch. The drugs take effect in Marcus and Kristen next, who sees herself talking with another participant. She is shocked when the events begin to play out in the present and likens the experience to déjà vu. Scratch suggests that Kristen is remembering the future, since time is not linear. Jerrems is told that co-researcher Dr. Rasmussen was found dead; he was the man at the start of the film.

During the night, Anna finds the bedroom door is locked, and watches as the girls inside cough and begin to die. The window is painted with blood and reads "5260." However, it is revealed that this was another case of 'remembering the future' as Anna finds herself in the present again. She attempts to leave and reveals that she saw everyone die in her vision. Curtis, a nurse who is in charge of monitoring the subjects, injects her with a sedative and Jerrems explains that she is experiencing a rare side effect. He leaves her strapped to a gurney while the effects wear off.

Marcus, Kristen, and Den see Curtis die and escape the building, joined by Scratch. Anna has a vision of freeing herself and another vision of Marcus dead. Den, Marcus, and Kristen return to the building to find Anna, leaving behind Scratch. The sleeping participants wake after smelling something from the vents. They begin to cough violently, as they did in Anna's vision. Anna breaks free and the gang informs her that the participants have been gassed with mustard gas. When Kristen goes to the bathroom, she goes missing.

Scratch finds an entrance into the building and discovers a drawing of himself with hands around his neck. The trio find Jerrems' office. A past video of Rasmussen and Jerrems plays on the computer, in which they are questioning a man named Pascal, a man who mysteriously acknowledges Den watching the video. Anna and Marcus realize that the bloody numbers were not "5260," but "5 2 GO," as Anna, Den, Kristen, Marcus and Scratch are the last five people alive while the mustard gas has killed the others. Scratch mixes together several vials of drugs and injects himself.

The group finds Jerrems in a locked room but he refuses to let them in. He tells them that Pascal was the first participant to have visions, and so was used to test new variations of the drug. The drug was revealed to have a cumulative effect, and Pascal began to stop experiencing time as linear. He had a psychotic break and is now killing the participants in order to pressure Jerrems into committing suicide. Scratch has a vision of himself being stabbed, twice. As such, he is attacked by someone and stabbed. Marcus realizes that Pascal is likely to kill everyone in order to erase all traces of the drug. Thinking Anna's visions can't come true if she can't see them happening, he hits her and Den attacks him in retaliation. Marcus stabs himself during the fight and dies.

Anna gets outside by jumping off the roof into a snowbank and goes to the car, where she finds Scratch's and Kristen's frozen bodies. She realizes that her vision of Kristen dying in the bathroom was wrong. She confronts Jerrems about the discrepancy and argues that the visions are not fate but merely self-fulfilling prophecies, which Jerrems agrees with. She then injects herself with the drug that Scratch had.

Den finds Pascal and attacks him. Pascal stabs Den prior to throwing him into the pool, where Anna later saves him. Dr. Layton arrives and unlocks the room Jerrems has been hiding in. Jerrems notices liquid on the floor; Layton drops his cigar and the room goes up in flames as Pascal walks away. Anna and Den make it outside. Pascal is watching them from the roof as sirens blare in the background.

== Cast ==
- Nathan Kress as Den Ferguson
- Virginia Gardner as Anna Nichols
- Kirby Bliss Blanton as Kristen
- Ryan Higa as Scratch
- Mark Furze as Marcus
- Ethan Peck as Pascal
- Mark Rolston as Dr. Layton
- William Mapother as Dr. Jerrems
- Christopher Allen as Curtis
- Katie Booth as Darcy
- Shaun J. Brown as Chad
- Daisun Cohn-Williams as Hal
- Barry Habib as Layton's Driver
- Julia Ling as Sorority Girl
- Reiley McClendon as Doug
- Mishel Prada as Nurse Rivera
- Wayne Alon Scott as Allen
- Matthew Skomo as Dr. Rasmussen
- Pam Trotter as Nurse Lamis
- Mark Furze as Marcus

== Production ==
Filming took place in Los Angeles, California.

== Release ==
The film was released online on September 16, 2016, in the United States.

== Reception ==
The film was panned by critics.
