= Expelled (film) =

2014 film written and directed by Alex Goyette

- Theatrical release poster
- Directed by: Alex Goyette
- Written by: Alex Goyette
- Produced by: Alex Goyette; Brian Robbins; Shauna Phelan
- Starring: Cameron Dallas; Matt Shively; Lia Marie Johnson; Marcus Johns; Andrea Russett; Kristina Hayes; Teala Dunn
- Cinematography: Jan-Michael Del Mundo
- Edited by: Josh Noyes
- Music by: The Outfit
- Production company: AwesomenessTV Films
- Distributed by: 20th Century Fox
- Release date: December 12, 2014 (United States)
- Running time: 85 minutes
- Country: United States
- Language: English

Expelled is a 2014 American teen comedy film written and directed by Alex Goyette, in his directorial debut. The film stars Cameron Dallas, Matt Shively, Lia Marie Johnson, Marcus Johns, Andrea Russett, Kristina Hayes and Teala Dunn. Most of the cast were popular online internet personalities. The film began a limited release in theatres on December 12, 2014, before being released on video on demand December 16, 2014, by 20th Century Fox.

== Plot ==
Felix O'Neil is a mischievous prankster who believes that school is a waste of time. After a series of antics which included rewiring fundraiser money to a koala sanctuary and programming the gym’s scoreboard to display a scandalous photo of a teacher, Felix finally gets expelled from Eastwood High school after receiving his third and final suspension from the school dean of students, Gary Truman for hacking vending machines to give out free gum which Felix is delighted to receive and considers an “early retirement”.

For several days, Felix shrewdly covers up his expulsion with the help of his tech savvy best friend, Danny. A week before report cards are supposed to be mailed, Felix makes a deal with his ex-girlfriend, Vanessa, where he will help her win a class election against her rival, Stacy, and in exchange Vanessa, Mr. Truman's assistant, will print a false straight A report card for Felix. Felix and Danny hack into Stacy's computer, and learn that she is a notorious cyberbully who goes by the screen-name of Roxy. Felix is able to get into the school and expose Stacy as a fraud and ensure Vanessa’s victory in the class election.

That night, Felix arrives home and finds his report card in the mail; Vanessa, however, lied and gave him Fs. Felix barely keeps his parents from finding out; in retaliation, he ruins the school play Vanessa stars in. After narrowly escaping from Truman, he is able to lie to his parents and convince Danny to help him break into school to fix his grades. Truman, however, catches him in the act, and calls the police, who arrest Felix.

Felix's older brother Ben, who broke out of the disciplinary Montana Mountain Academy by shipping himself out to their house, is able to bail Felix out. When they get home, their mom, Julie, pressures Felix about his report card, which Felix pressures Danny to give him. Felix's parents are amazed by their son's straight-A report card. Julie has to go to a parent-teacher conference with Felix's history teacher, Mr. Harris, as Harris had contacted Felix's parents about his failures in his class. Felix enlists in the help of the school custodian to pose as his history teacher, who meets with Felix at his house. Ben, shocked, accidentally knocks him out. Felix, having no other choice, goes with Julie to the conference. Ben attempts to stop the conference, but hilariously fails. When Harris is about to tell Julie about Felix's expulsion, Ben, at the last second, lanches a tranquilizer dart at him. Julie finds Ben in the hallway, and even though Felix denies knowledge of it, Julie grounds him indefinitely promising to meet with Truman as soon as possible.

Ben is sent back to the academy, but not before planning his next escape; meanwhile, Julie is doing everything to meet with Truman about Felix. A delivery pizza girl, Katie, convinces him to find a way to get Truman to re-enroll him. After getting into the school, they see Truman late at night, doing something on his computer. Deducing something is suspicious, Felix convinces Danny to bug Truman's computer, and learns that Truman is a gambling addict who has stolen a significant amount of school money to support his addiction. Felix blackmails Truman to re-enroll him, threatening to report him to the police for embezzlement if he refuses. Truman begins the re-enrollment process, but Vanessa sees Felix's name on the form, and eventually figures out that Felix is blackmailing him. She agrees to help Truman, and steals back the evidence of his addiction, in the form of Danny's hard drive.

After Felix and Danny realize that the evidence is missing, they head to the school, where Truman gloats to Felix about beating him. Danny, however, while Truman is distracted discreetly steals Truman's laptop, which has clear evidence of his illicit activities. Julie arrives feeling fed up and Truman lies about Felix, stating that he is an exemplary student that has successfully participated in several extra-curricular activities and confirms that Felix's "Straight A" report card is authentic. Julie's suspicions about the report card being false are therefore relieved. Julie apologises to Felix for not believing him.

Felix is later re-enrolled for the next semester at Eastwood High, and wins Katie's affection. Although he still does not understand the importance of education, he begins to apply himself and starts to earn better grades than ever before seeing education as a game with a fixed set of rules he is now willing to follow.

== Cast ==
- Cameron Dallas as Felix O'Neil, a mischievous prankster
- Matt Shively as Danny, Felix's tech savvy best friend
- Lia Marie Johnson as Katie, a pizza delivery girl who later becomes Felix's girlfriend
- Marcus Johns as Ben O'Neil, Felix's older brother
- Andrea Russett as Vanessa, Felix's ex-girlfriend
- Emilio Palame as Gary Truman, the school dean
- Kristina Hayes as Julie O'Neil, Felix's mom
- Teala Dunn as Emily, Vanessa's best friend
- Michelle Glavin as Stacy, a student who accused Felix of spying on her in the restroom in freshman year
- Circus-Szalewski as Shamus, the school janitor
- Tom McLaren as Phil O'Neil, Felix's dad
- Stevie Mack as Mr. Harris, Felix's history teacher
- Rene Aranda as Felix's arresting officer

== Production ==
In April 2014, AwesomenessTV CEO Brian Robbins announced he was making a film starring Dallas. In September 2014, it was revealed that Cameron Dallas, Andrea Russett, Teala Dunn, Lia Marie Johnson and Matt Shively had all joined the cast of the film. Russett wrapped her scenes on September 23, 2014. Production on the film ended on October 9, 2014.

== Release ==
The film was released in a limited release on December 12, 2014, prior to being released on video on demand on December 16, 2014. Expelled rocketed to the top of the digital charts on iTunes and most other digital platforms on its first day of release, and has been called a "case study in how to make money from younger consumers with movies." The film was released on Netflix worldwide beginning on February 1, 2015.

With Viacom's acquisition of AwesomenessTV in 2018, the distribution rights for the movie are once again overseen by Brian Robbins who was named head of Viacom's Paramount Pictures in 2021.

== Reception ==
Nicolas Rapold, writing for The New York Times, felt Dallas was unable to carry a feature film, stating "Stretched over an 85-minute feature[...] Mr. Dallas' brand of easy goofing just feels like coasting." while Sherilyn Connelly from The Village Voice felt that "...Expelled isn't going to change the world, but it's a fun and promising debut film."
