= Island Wars =

New Zealand reality television series

Island Wars was a New Zealand reality television show, produced by Touchdown Television for TV2.

== Description ==
It was a reality TV show (actually a parody of reality game shows) that began airing in 2009 and is about the Kiwis and Aussies at war.

The other "contestants" are competitives of common reality TV show contestants.

- Hosts Mikey Havoc and Dave Fane
- NZ Team

- Laural Barrett, Miss Universe NZ 2007
- Logan Swann "Rugby League"
- "Anna Fitzgerald"
- "Jan Maree" "Comedian"
- "Danny (Cage) Devine"
- "Andrew Beattie"

- Aussie Team

- "Amelia Hunter" "Comedian"
- Craig Johnston "Australia's Man of The Land"
- "Jaime Wright"
- "Jason Stevens"
- "Evan Burrell"
- "Kaite Richardson"

At the end of the show, Johnston was the winner.
