= Andrea Russett =

American YouTuber and actress

- Russett in 2018
- Born: Andrea Rose Russett; June 27, 1995 (age 31); Fort Wayne, Indiana, U.S.

YouTube information
- Channel: Andrea Russett
- Years active: 2008–present
- Genres: Comedy; vlog
- Subscribers: 2.74 million
- Views: 232 million
- Last updated: April 8, 2026

Andrea Rose Russett (born June 27, 1995) is an American internet personality. She is active on Snapchat, Instagram, and YouTube. Russett released music for her first time in 2020, making her a published singer-songwriter.

== Early life ==
Russett was born in Fort Wayne, Indiana to Mark (William) and Jacqui Russett, who are both graphic designers. She has one sister (Nethu), Anna, and one brother, Anthony.

She attended Bishop Dwenger, a private Catholic high school, until her junior year, when she moved to California and began attending an online school. However, she left the program during her final year, saying "everybody learns differently and I don't learn by reading and writing a report. I need to be doing something to learn."

== Career ==
In 2009 during her early teens, Russett began broadcasting on YouTube when she created a music video entry for a contest to meet Justin Bieber. Although her entry didn't win, it went viral and launched her career.

In 2012 she started her first job, working as a nighttime radio DJ in Fort Wayne, Indiana and becoming the youngest nationally syndicated radio host in the country.

In her junior year of high school, she moved to California after signing a contract with Fullscreen.

In 2013, Russett began designing her own clothing line, FLAWD Clothing. (As of Aug 2019, the clothing website no longer exists, and social media accounts for the line have been inactive since Jun 2015.)

Since achieving YouTube fame, Russett has appeared in several movies including Expelled (2014), Lovesick (2016), and Sickhouse (2016). Sickhouse is a thriller film that was initially released in brief increments via her Snapchat account. She also attended a few VidCon events, for meet-and-greets with her fans.

Since then, Russett has changed her path of career onto music. She released her first song, Darkest Hour, in October 2020. The second song, Get Out Alive, premiered on YouTube in December the same year. She started a Twitch account in 2022.

== Personal life ==
On September 21, 2018, Russett came out as bisexual through a series of tweets on Twitter. Andrea has also been vocal on social media about her addiction to alcohol, as well as her struggles with getting sober. On August 14, 2026, Andrea posted on Instagram that she was 30 days sober from drugs and alcohol after checking into a 28-day treatment facility, her 6th attempt at inpatient treatment.

== Filmography ==
=== Film ===
Year	Title	Role	Notes	Ref.
2014	Expelled	Vanessa	Felix's ex-girlfriend	
2016	Lovesick	The Girlfriend	Short film	
2016	Sickhouse	Andrea		
2016	A Peculiar Tale	Fortune Teller	Short film	
2016	Mike and Dave Need Wedding Dates	Grungy Girl No. 2	Cameo appearance	

=== Television ===
Year	Title	Role	Network	Notes	Ref.
2014	@SummerBreak	Herself	YouTube	Season 2 guest role	
2015–present	YouTubers React	Herself		12 episodes	
2016	Making Moves	Herself		Guest appearance; 1 episode	
2016	Catfish: The TV Show	Herself	MTV	Guest appearance; 1 episode	
2017–present	Apologies in Advance with Andrea Russett	Herself		Host	
2017	Escape the Night	Herself as "The Mystic"		Main role; Season 2; 10 episodes	
2018	Guilty Party	Cat Carlson	Fullscreen	Main role; Season 2: Full Season	
2026	100 Cooks	Herself	Food Network	3 episodes	

== Discography ==
=== Singles ===
Title	Year	Written by	Ref.
"Darkest Hour"	2020	Matt Romagna, Dan Wilson, & Andrea Russett	
"Get Out Alive"	2020	Matt Romagna & Andrea Russett	
"Freezing"	2021	Andrea Russett & Matt Romagna	
"Stranger"	2021	Andrea Russett & Matt Romagna	
