= Revenge of the Green Dragons =

2014 Hong Kong-American film by Andrew Lau and Andrew Loo

- United States theatrical release poster
- Directed by: Andrew Lau; Andrew Loo
- Written by: Andrew Loo; Michael Di Jiacomo
- Based on: Revenge of the Green Dragons by Fredric Dannen
- Produced by: Allen Bain; Jesse Scolaro; Michael Bassick; Stuart Ford
- Starring: Justin Chon; Kevin Wu; Harry Shum Jr.; Eugenia Yuan; Geoff Pierson; Ray Liotta
- Cinematography: Martin Ahlgren
- Edited by: Michelle Tesoro
- Music by: Mark Kilian
- Production companies: Artfire Films; IM Global Octane; Initial A Entertainment; The 7th Floor
- Distributed by: Golden Scene (Hong Kong); A24 (United States)
- Release dates: September 10, 2014 (TIFF); October 24, 2014
- Running time: 95 minutes
- Countries: Hong Kong; United States
- Languages: English; Cantonese; Mandarin
- Budget: $5 million
- Box office: $107,412

Revenge of the Green Dragons is a 2014 crime drama film directed by Andrew Lau and Andrew Loo, written by Michael Di Jiacomo and Andrew Loo, and featuring Martin Scorsese as an executive producer. A Hong Kong-American co-production, the film stars Justin Chon, Kevin Wu, Harry Shum Jr., Eugenia Yuan, Geoff Pierson, and Ray Liotta. The film is based on Fredric Dannen's New Yorker article that chronicled the true story of Chinese-American gang life in 1980s and 1990s New York City. The central villain Snake Head Mama is based on gangster Sister Ping.

== Plot ==
An immigrant named Sonny (Chon) joined the Chinatown gang "The Green Dragons" when he was a kid, and worked his way up through the gang hierarchy. But as he quickly rose up the ranks and became notorious in the community, his life falls apart around him.

== Cast ==
- Justin Chon as Sonny
  - Alex Fox as Little Sonny
- Kevin Wu as Steven Wong
  - Michael Gregory Fung as Little Steven
- Harry Shum Jr. as Paul Wong
- Eugenia Yuan as Snake Head Mama
- Leonard Wu as Ah Chung
- Jin Au-Yeung as Detective Tang
- Jon Kit Lee as Teddy
- Shuya Chang as Tina
- Celia Szeming Au as Bobo
- Ron Yuan as Born to Kill Dai Lo
- Billy Magnussen as Detective Boyer
- Geoff Pierson as FBI Deputy Director Sam Higgins
- Ray Liotta as FBI Agent Michael Bloom

== Production ==
Principal photography began in June 2013 in Chinatown, New York City. Scenes were filmed in some parts of Queens and Brooklyn, New York such as Elmhurst.

On November 2, 2013, Mark Kilian was hired to score the film. Varèse Sarabande released the original soundtrack album on October 27, 2014.

== Release ==
The film had its world premiere on September 10, 2014 at the 2014 Toronto International Film Festival, and then went on to be screened at a number of other international film festivals. The film also received a day-and-date theatrical and VOD release in the United States on October 24, 2014. In December 2014, co-director Andrew Lau said that the film was able to make profit.

== Reception ==
The film has received largely negative reviews from film critics. On the review aggregator website Rotten Tomatoes, 16% of 25 critics' reviews are positive, with an average rating of 4.1/10. Metacritic, which uses a weighted average, assigned the film a score of 36 out of 100, based on 12 critics, indicating "generally unfavorable" reviews.

However, co-director Andrew Loo had traveled all over the United States with the film, and said: "I've found that this is actually a real-audience film.....In terms of audience reception, I don't think we've ever had a 'bad' screening. It's interesting that the critics hate the film because it's not an easy film to watch. It's a genre film dressed up as an art house film because you have Marty's [Scorsese's] name on it."
