= Chester See =

American YouTube personality, singer and actor (born 1983)

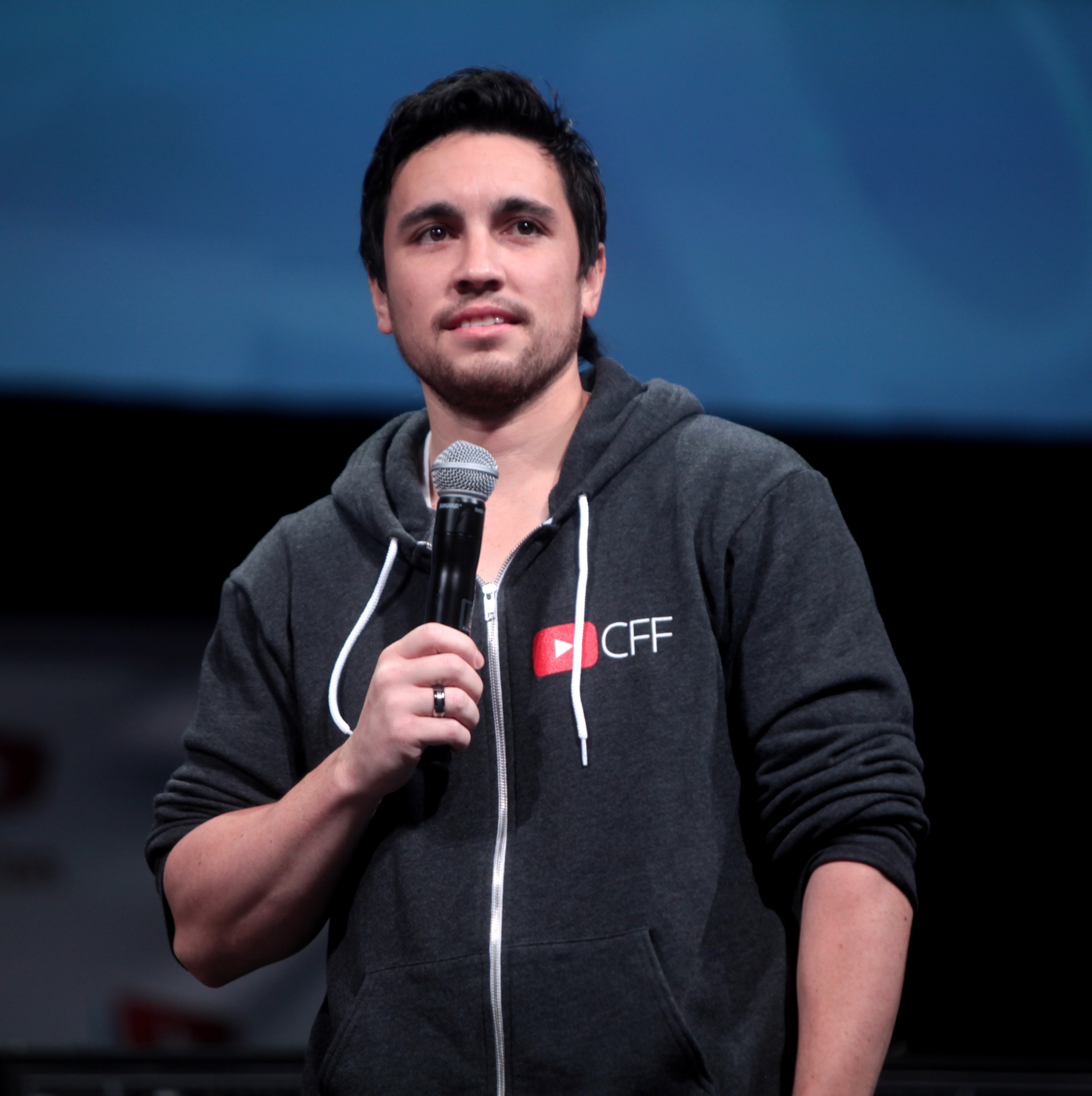
- See at Vidcon 2014
- Born: Chester Lionel Watch; April 20, 1983 (age 43)
- Education: BA in Economics and Theater Arts
- Alma mater: UCLA
- Occupations: Actor, musician, vlogger
- Years active: 2006–present
- Known for: YouTube personality, singer, songwriter
- Awards: 2014 Streamy for Best Original Song
- Website: chestersee.com/info/

Chester See (born Chester Lionel Watch April 20, 1983) is an American YouTuber, singer and actor. He is best known for his YouTube videos, which have garnered over 324 million views, as of January 2026. He appeared as Stacee Jaxx in Rock of Ages on Broadway from October 2014 through January 2015.

== Career ==
In 2006 See hosted Disney 365, an entertainment news program on the Disney Channel, which ran until 2009.

See started his ChesterSee YouTube channel in 2007 after having some success writing lyrics for Warner/Chappell. The channel primarily consists of comedy sketches, short films and cover songs. He is part of the Maker Studios multi-channel network. In 2011, See, alongside YouTubers Nigahiga and Kevin Wu uploaded a music video titled Nice Guys. In 2012, See, alongside YouTubers Nigahiga and Kevin Wu, also film director Justin Lin, started the YOMYOMF YouTube channel. The channel released an internet-only reality TV talent show called Internet Icon later that year; See hosted the first season. Later in the year, See was a contestant on season 2 of D-trix's Dance Showdown.

In 2013 See was the executive producer for online-only NBC and AwesomenessTV produced musical comedy series Side Effects; he also starred as Keith in eight episodes over two seasons. The following year See was cast as Jeff Sanford in the comedy film Camp Takota, in a supporting role alongside Grace Helbig, Mamrie Hart and Hannah Hart. See starred as Stacee Jaxx in a Broadway production of Rock of Ages from October 27, 2014 through January 4, 2015. See appeared in the 2015 Relativity Digital and FilmOn feature film, Bob Thunder: Internet Assassin. In 2018, he made a guest appearance on the tenth season of RuPaul's Drag Race, where he was given a drag makeover by contestant Miz Cracker. He and Cracker won the challenge and was given a Klein, Epstein, and Parker $2,000 gift card as a prize.

As of January 2020, See has produced over 400 YouTube videos and has over 1.9 million subscribers to his YouTube channel ChesterSee and over 275 million video views. As of August 2014, he has sold over 500,000 songs on iTunes. See is influential through social media, with over 200,000 followers on both Twitter and Instagram as of January 2020.

=== Awards and nominations ===
See was nominated for two Streamy awards in 2013 at the 3rd Streamy Awards, under the "Best Online Musician" and "Audience Choice Finalists for Personality of the Year" categories. He received a further four nominations in 2014, winning the "Original Song" category for his song "Whistle While I Work It" in collaboration with Toby Turner and Wayne Brady. He was also nominated in the "Best Collaboration" (for his cover of "No Diggity" by Blackstreet with Flula Borg), "Best Cover Song" (for his cover of "Roar" by Katy Perry with Andy Lange, Andrew Garcia and Josh Golden) and "Best Musical Artist" categories.

In 2014, See's YouTube Channel was listed on New Media Rockstars Top 100 Channels, ranked at #44.

== Education ==
See graduated from UCLA in 2005 with a BA in Economics and Theater Arts.

== Filmography ==
=== Film ===
Year	Title	Role	Notes
2014	Camp Takota	Jeff Sanford	
2015	Bob Thunder: Internet Assassin	Himself	
2016	Dirty 30	Ben	

=== Television ===
Year	Title	Role	Notes
2006–2009	Disney 365	Himself	22 episodes
2012	Yesterday, Today, Forever	Himself	8 episodes
2013–2014	Side Effects	Keith	8 episodes on AwesomenessTV's YouTube Channel, 2 seasons
2018	Rupaul's Drag Race	Himself / Miz Cookie	Episode: "Social Media Kings Into Queens"

=== Music videos ===
Year	Artist	Title	Role	Notes
2014	Bart Baker	"Wiggle Parody"	Greg Wiggle	

=== Theatre ===
Year	Title	Role	Notes
2014–2015	Rock of Ages	Stacee Jaxx	Broadway
