= KevJumba =

American monk and Internet personality (born 1990)

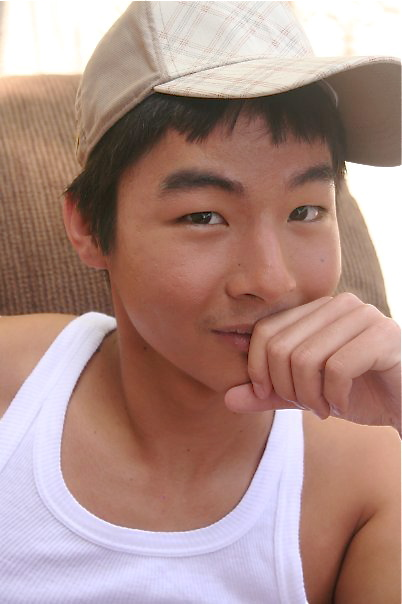
- Wu in 2008
- Born: Kevin Wu; June 12, 1990 (age 36); Houston, Texas, U.S.
- Other names: JumbaFund; cybermuse
- Occupations: YouTuber; actor; writer

YouTube information
- Channel: KEVIN
- Years active: 2006–2018
- Genres: Comedy, Gaming
- Subscribers: 2.63 million
- Views: 386.3 million

Chinese name
- Chinese: 吳凱文
Transcriptions
Standard Mandarin
- Hanyu Pinyin: Wú Kǎiwén
- IPA: [ǔ kʰàɪwə̌n]
Yue: Cantonese
- Jyutping: Ng4 Hoi2man4
Southern Min
- Hokkien POJ: Gô͘ Khái-bûn
- Last updated: 30 October 2021

Kevin Wu (born June 12, 1990) is an American monk and retired YouTuber who was best known under his former username KevJumba. He is currently a member of the International Society for Krishna Consciousness (ISKCON).

== Early life and education ==
Wu was born on June 12, 1990, in Houston, Texas. His father, Michael Wu, a Taiwanese immigrant, is a computer engineer. Wu graduated from Clements High School in Sugar Land, Texas in 2008 and attended the University of California, Davis for two years before dropping out. He began uploading videos to YouTube during his junior year of high school.

While working in entertainment, Wu lived in downtown Los Angeles before later returning to Houston. He was severely injured in a car crash in June 2015. In May 2019, he completed a bachelor's degree in psychology at the University of Houston.

== Career ==
=== YouTube ===
Wu became known for humorous videos centered on personal observations, sketches, and stories. His audience grew substantially after his video "I Have to Deal With Stereotypes" was featured on YouTube's home page. In the video, Wu jokes about stereotypes he encounters as an Asian American, including assumptions that he is cheap, academically gifted, and socially awkward. He jokes that buying a "brand new, top-of-the-line" TI-84 calculator undermines his attempt to disprove one stereotype, while receiving a B+ supposedly disproves another. The sketch ends with Wu arranging for someone to call his phone so he can demonstrate his social life, only for the caller to ask why Wu told him to call.

Wu also featured his father, later known to viewers as PapaJumba, on his channel. After appearing in candid clips following Wu's video "Butthash Hero", his father made a more formal debut in "I Love My Dad" and subsequently appeared alongside Wu in numerous videos. Wu also collaborated with fellow YouTube comedian Christine Gambito (HappySlip), making five videos with her.

On February 26, 2008, the Los Angeles Times compared the web series Quarterlife's viewership with Wu's. At the time, Wu was described as a "semi-well known YouTube blogger", and a video in which he discussed breaking his shin had received 450,000 views, compared with 100,000 views for Quarterlife on MySpace and 50,000 on YouTube. By May 29, 2008, Wu was one of three East Asians under the age of 21 ranked among YouTube's five most-subscribed users, with 187,000 subscribers and more than 5.9 million views. By June 5, he had become YouTube's most-subscribed comedian and its third most-subscribed uploader overall.

San Francisco Chronicle columnist Jeff Yang wrote that Wu was not a comedian in the conventional sense, but that by "just talking [he] is, well, pretty hilarious", citing his deadpan delivery, animated facial expressions, and tendency toward unexpected digressions. Wu's videos also received replies from Ella Koon, Jessica Alba, and Baron Davis.

In 2008, Davis created a "longest stare" contest for ibeatyou.com, a site he co-founded with Alba's husband, Cash Warren. Davis challenged Wu, who then challenged Alba, and she responded.

In 2011, Wu began performing with Yesterday, Today, Forever (YTF) alongside other YouTube personalities. The group held its first concert on October 9, 2011, in Honolulu, Hawaii. In June 2012, Wu began appearing on YOMYOMF, where he starred in the series KevJumba Takes All.

=== Web, television, and film ===
In 2007, Wu appeared on The CW Television Network's short-lived Online Nation, which compiled web clips for a primetime television audience and lasted four episodes. Wu also broadcast streaming shows on BlogTV. He had been a member of BlogTV since March 29, 2008, and by November 2, 2008, had produced 70 live shows and 23 recorded shows, drawing more than 300,000 viewers to the live broadcasts and 100,000 to recorded programs.

In 2008, Wu co-starred with Jessica Lee Rose and Philip DeFranco in Hooking Up from HBOLabs, the online arm of HBO. The scripted, 10-episode web series was set at a fictional university and was Wu's first scripted production. Guest appearances included Kevin Nalty, Michael Buckley, and other internet personalities. The cast consisted entirely of YouTube video bloggers, an effort to attract a young, internet-oriented audience. By its second day on YouTube, the series had received more than 450,000 views. Maria Russo of the Los Angeles Times criticized Wu's role as "the East Asian friend who helps the white guy get the chicks", while Bobbie Johnson of The Guardian noted that some viewers saw the project as an attempt to capitalize on the cast's online popularity.

In the summer of 2010, Wu and Philip Wang of Wong Fu Productions starred in the web series Funemployed, alongside other YouTube personalities including Nigahiga, David Choi, Kina Grannis, and Chester See. The series follows friends Kyle (Wu) and Jason (Wang) as they deal with unemployment and try to make money through YouTube. It reached 500,000 viewers within several weeks and concluded on July 27, 2010, after eleven episodes, with the finale "Gave it a Shot".

==== The Amazing Race ====
In May and June 2010, Wu and his father filmed the 17th season of The Amazing Race. The announcement also revealed his father's first name, Michael, which had previously been kept private. Wu announced their participation on Facebook on September 1 and on YouTube a week later. The season premiered on September 26, 2010.

Michael and Kevin's best placements were third-place finishes in Leg 2 and Leg 6. Their worst placement was ninth in Leg 3, a non-elimination leg. They were eliminated in seventh place during Leg 7 after receiving two 30-minute penalties for using a cab between tasks when they had been instructed to walk. Another team received a similar penalty but had only one 30-minute penalty and checked in after them, resulting in Michael and Kevin's elimination.

==== Hang Loose ====
Wu began working on a film with Dante Basco and Kinetic Films LLC in late 2011. In December 2012, Wu released his first full-length feature film, Hang Loose.

Hang Loose is a comedy in which Wu, playing himself, travels to Hawaii for his sister's wedding and becomes involved in a misadventure with his future brother-in-law, played by Dante Basco. Frequent collaborator Justin Chon appears as the main antagonist, BJ.

Wu hosted "Flicks" on Cartoon Network on October 2, 2011, during an airing of Around the World in 80 Days. He also starred as Danny in the 2012 independent film Rock Jocks with Justin Chon, Felicia Day, and Gerry Bedknob. In 2014, Wu starred in the crime drama film Revenge of the Green Dragons, executive produced by Martin Scorsese.

In 2011, Wu sponsored Brian Wong in the NASCAR K&N Pro Series West. Wong raced a car bearing Wu's paint scheme in the Casino Arizona 125 at Phoenix International Raceway.

Wu was honored by East West Players, the oldest Asian Pacific American (APA) theatre company in the United States, at its 47th Visionary Awards in 2013 for helping increase the presence of Asian Pacific Americans in arts and entertainment. Tim Dang, then the company's Producing Artistic Director, called Wu "a great example of the 'next generation' taking the lead to raise the visibility of Asian Americans through new media and the art of comedy."

=== JumbaFund ===
Wu launched the JumbaFund YouTube channel in 2009 with the stated goal of donating all of its earnings to charities suggested by viewers. Wu said in his videos that he recorded himself making the donations to demonstrate that the channel's revenue was used for charitable purposes.

In 2011, Wu was invited by the nonprofit The Supply to teach English in Nairobi, Kenya. After returning to the United States, he uploaded videos from the trip to the JumbaFund channel and donated more than $5,000 in advertising revenue to The Supply. The organization used the money toward construction of the then-named Jumba Lenana Academy, a secondary school in the Lenana neighborhood where Wu had volunteered. JumbaFund had previously donated to organizations including the Red Cross and St. Jude Children's Research Hospital. In February 2012, Wu said that he would dedicate the channel's annual revenue to completing the school. The school was finished in 2013 and renamed "KevJumba High School". JumbaFund ultimately donated more than $50,000 toward construction, and Wu said he intended to continue helping cover the facility's operating costs.

=== Later online activity and retirement from YouTube ===
Beginning in September 2013, Wu became inactive on YouTube and stopped uploading new videos. Before his retirement, he had more than 3,000,000 subscribers and more than 350 million combined views on videos uploaded to his main channel. His combined video views later totaled more than 343.9 million. In early 2016, Wu privatized the videos on the KevJumba account, making the channel's content unavailable to the public, while the 35 videos on his JumbaFund channel remained public. The privatized videos were later made public again.

On April 21, 2016, Wu resurfaced on social media after an almost three-year absence with a blog titled "Monk.College". He wrote that he had left YouTube to meditate, having developed an interest in Buddhism and transcendental meditation, and to attend college. According to the blog, he was living in Houston, Texas. In August 2016, Wu privatized "Monk.College" for unspecified reasons.

In March 2017, Wu made his first public appearance in several years at the Youth Represent the World Concert in Stafford, Texas, where he spoke publicly about his 2015 car accident. That month, he also uploaded two new videos, "Hope." and "YOUTH REPRESENT" LIVE (Internet Power!)".

In November 2020, Wu created an account on Twitch, originally titled cybermuse. He later hosted the Twitch livestream portion of the annual Head in the Clouds music festival in 2021 and 2022.

On August 20, 2022, Wu began posting music videos to his YouTube channel, which by then used the name KEVIN rather than KevJumba. The videos, all of which were later deleted, featured a collection of songs by zooty and Wu, produced by Jonum, with album artwork bearing the title "cyber muse" created by Wu. On January 12, 2023, he posted "Youtube, Starting from Scratch", which signaled another return to posting on YouTube; the video was later made private.

On February 1, 2025, Wu deleted his KevJumba and JumbaFund channels.

== Filmography ==
- Hang Loose (2012)
- Rock Jocks (2012)
- Revenge of the Green Dragons (2014)
- Man Up (2015)
- Twinsters (2015)

== See also ==
- History of the Chinese Americans in Houston
