= Los Angeles Center Studios =

Film production studio

- Location within Los Angeles
- Former names: Union Oil Center

General information
- Location: 450 South Bixel Street; Los Angeles, California; 90017
- Coordinates: 34.055393°N 118.26109°W
- Groundbreaking: 1955
- Completed: April 1958

Design and construction
- Architect: William Pereira
- Architecture firm: Pereira & Luckman
- Main contractor: Del E. Webb Construction Company

Los Angeles Center Studios is a 20-acre (8.1 ha) film production studio located in the City West neighborhood of Los Angeles, California, United States.

== History ==
The main building opened in April 1958 as the Union Oil Center and served as the headquarters of Union Oil Company of California. The tower was designed by architect William Pereira. In 1996, Union Oil vacated the premises.

After the construction of six sound stages and renovation of the Unocal building, the studio opened in 1999. The 20-acre (8.1 ha) complex includes six film production sound stages, ten buildings, three streets and a private park. The main gate is located at 450 South Bixel Street.

In 2006, the Los Angeles Times reported that with Dreamgirls and Numb3rs filming at the studio, the city's decades-old vision for City West was finally being fulfilled. The studio's distinctive main building and bridge appear as exterior shots of the Los Angeles FBI office in Numb3rs, as well as numerous other television shows.
