= YOMYOMF =

YouTube channel

- Founded: May 7, 2010; 16 years ago
- Founder: Ryan Higa; Kevin Wu; Chester See; Justin Lin
- Website: youoffendmeyouoffendmyfamily.com

YOMYOMF, whose name is an acronym for "You Offend ME, You Offend My FAMILY," was a YouTube channel aggregating talent from various performers. Even though the YOMYOMF Network is an Asian American pop culture channel, the channel is intended to showcase quality programming, regardless of the race of the contributors. YouTube stars Ryan Higa (Nigahiga), Kevin Wu (KevJumba), and Chester See feature prominently on the channel. Justin Lin directs the channel.

== History ==
The channel posted its first video, "Interpretations Trailer," on April 30, 2010. This was followed by eighteen other videos, posted through February 2012. These videos were posted prior to the channel's official unveiling in June 2012 which is related to the current channel.

YouTube picked up the concept and funded it as one of their funded channel. The new channel debuted in 2012 June 4 with an introductory video entitled "It Has Begun: Bananapocalypse." The video featured celebrities including Jessica Alba, Gillian Jacobs, Wayne Brady, and Masi Oka. It received more than one million views within two weeks, and the channel gained 100,000 subscribers in a day.

The channel is based on the Asian American pop culture blog, You Offend Me You Offend My Family.

Founding Partners are Philip W. Chung, Baron Davis, Salvador Gatdula, Ryan Higa, Abdul Khan, Justin Lin, Chester See, Cash Warren and Kevin Wu.

The YOMYOMF YouTube channel was one of the first channels to be funded by YouTube. YOMYOMF was given expectations of being successful by New Media Rockstars, following the channel's introduction video.

== Content ==
The channel is intended to showcase quality programming, regardless of the race of the contributors. It offers regularly scheduled programming.

=== Internet Icon ===
Internet Icon is a competition between comedy teams to produce videos in a 24-hour timespan. Chris Riedell hosts the show while YouTube sensation Ryan Higa, American actress Christine Lakin, and YouTube star Timothy DeLaGhetto judge the contestants. The episodes of the first season aired on Tuesdays and Thursdays at 8 pm EST. The judges first watch a huge number of videos, and limit the audience down to a top 10. They then compete in a series of challenges, until the top 2 remain. The top 2 are voted on for which one will be the next Internet icon. The Internet icon will redeem several grand prizes.

=== Acting for Action ===
Acting for Action is a scripted comedy that deals with acting instruction given to other performers. The series stars Sung Kang, famous for his role in The Fast and the Furious franchise, and his partner, Antonio Alvarez. Sung gives other famous performers tips on how to improve their acting. His students must pay $1000 to receive his knowledge, however, they soon come to regret their actions when they realize what he teaches has no relation to what they expected to learn. So far, Ryan Higa, Chester See, Clara Chung, KevJumba and Bart Kwan & Joe Jo of Just Kidding Films have guest starred as students on the series. Episodes air on Wednesdays at 8 pm EST.

=== DR0NE ===
DR0NE is a sci-fi/action web series about a humanoid war drone that goes on the run in the wake of a mysterious incident. The series features cutting edge special effects and action that spans near-future warzones and urban environments. The series was created and directed by Robert Glickert and stars Lance Reddick (Fringe) and Kenneth Choi (Captain America: The First Avenger). The show was recently nominated for Streamy Awards for Best Action or Sci-Fi Series, Best Cinematography – Sean Stiegemeier, and Best Visual Effects – Origami Digital.

=== KevJumba Takes All ===
A number of series are planned for the channel. Kevin Wu hosts KevJumba Takes All which is a "reality competition show" where he challenges other performers to complete random tasks. So far, Wu has challenged Felicia Day to take the SATs to see who will get the higher score, Harry Shum, Jr. to a pole dancing contest to see who could earn the most money, Justin Chon to an eating competition, and Jay Park to a zombie-killing contest. The series usually airs on Wednesdays at 8 pm EST, however, the show is currently taking a break to make time for the newest series, BFFs, to air.

=== The Short List ===
The Short List aggregates short films. It is curated by Anderson Le, who serves as artistic director for the Hawaii International Film Festival and the Los Angeles Asian Pacific Film Festival.

=== BFFs ===
BFFs is a show that's currently taken over the slot previously filled by KevJumba Takes All.

=== Always You ===
Created by Chester See and directed by the Brothers Riedell, Always You is a series which debuted August 28, 2012. It stars Ki Hong Lee and Internet Icon finalist Lana McKissack. The story is one relationship told through songs from the top YouTube artists – Tiffany Alvord, DeStorm Power, David Choi, Kina Grannis and Tyler Ward.

=== Squad 85 ===
Created by Gregory Bonsignore, Squad 85 is the critically acclaimed New 80s Cop Comedy – starring Parvesh Cheena as the Arch-Villain to a Squad of cops who time traveled from 1985 to the present, per the premise, "In 1985 The Los Angeles Police Department experimented with a secret Time-Travel Division, catapulting for of LA's finest 25 years into the future. That future... is Now!" Episodes air Tuesday at 8 pm (EST).
