= Kassem G =

American actor (born 1983)

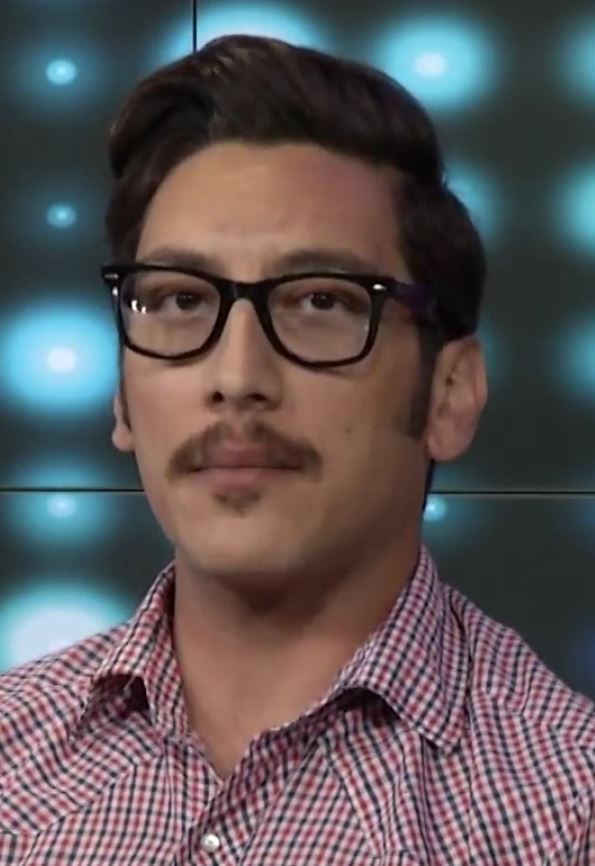
- Gharaibeh in 2014
- Born: Kassem Gharaibeh; October 10, 1983 (age 43); Amman, Jordan
- Occupation: Actor
- Years active: 2006–Present

YouTube information
- Channel: Kassem G
- Years active: 2006–2023
- Genres: Comedy; Acting
- Subscribers: 2.29 million
- Views: 22 million
- Last updated: 14 January 2026
- Website: www.youtube.com/user/kassemg

Kassem Gharaibeh (Arabic: قاسم الغرايبة; born October 10, 1983) is an American actor. He has hosted and presented Attack of the Show!. His YouTube channel Kassem G hosts several hundred videos, most notably the California On, Going Deep and Street Music webseries. He won the 2013 Streamy Award for Best Host for his work on California On.

== Early life ==
Gharaibeh was born in 1983 in Amman, Jordan to a Jordanian father and an Egyptian mother. He described his family as liberal Muslims. He lived in Saudi Arabia at a very young age then moved to Kissimmee, Florida when he was four years old after his father, who worked at a hotel, got a promotion. His family moved to Ventura County, California when he was 10. Before his YouTube career, Gharaibeh was working at a Best Buy and doing stand-up comedy on the weekends, mostly performing in small venues like restaurants.

== Career ==
Gharaibeh got the idea to start making YouTube videos when his friend Cory Williams had a video that went viral. After working in retail for nearly a decade, Gharaibeh finally quit his job and began making videos full-time. In 2011, he co-starred in the YouTube film Agents of Secret Stuff starring Ryan Higa as Mr. Anderson.

He won the 2013 Streamy Award for Best Host, beating out four other nominees including Larry King. He has appeared on the cannabis culture-oriented podcast Getting Doug with High six times. He also appeared in a brief role in the 2014 film Transformers: Age of Extinction. In 2009, he co-founded Maker Studios along with Shay Butler, Danny Zappin and Lisa Donovan.

On March 24, 2014, Maker Studios accepted a buyout offer from The Walt Disney Company for $500 million, rising to $950 million if financial milestones were met. In March 2021, he made most of his YouTube videos private and not viewable by the public. Gharaibeh formerly hosted the Pajama Pants podcast alongside Sopranos actors Robert Iler and Jamie-Lynn Sigler; on it, he explained that as he got older he began to no longer identify with the videos he made earlier in his life, and found many of them offensive and unfunny. In April 2021, he was revealed to be a new host of G4 as part of their relaunch later that year, and in November he was announced to be a host of their revival of Attack of the Show!. Both ended a year later when the network was shut down.

Today, Gharaibeh appears on the YouTube gaming channel "BroughtYouThisThing" with Bruce Greene and Lawrence Sonntag, formerly of Funhaus. He also streams himself doing a variety of things and has made appearances in projects with other content creators from early YouTube, such as The Grumps.
