= Ryan Higa =

American YouTuber and streamer (born 1990)

- Higa in 2020
- Born: June 6, 1990 (age 36); Hilo, Hawaii, U.S.
- Occupations: YouTuber; actor

Twitch information
- Channel: itsRyanHiga
- Years active: 2020–present
- Genre: Gaming
- Games: Valorant; Minecraft; Among Us; League of Legends
- Followers: 861 thousand

YouTube information
- Channels: nigahiga; HigaTV
- Years active: 2006–2020
- Genre: Comedy
- Subscribers: 20.7 million (nigahiga); 4.51 million (HigaTV)
- Views: 4.42 billion (nigahiga); 923 million (HigaTV)
- Last updated: July 16, 2026
- Website: www.higatv.com

Ryan Higa (born June 6, 1990), also known as nigahiga (/ˈniːɡəhiːɡə/ NEE-ɡə-HEE-ɡə), is an American internet personality, comedian, actor, streamer and former YouTuber. Best known for his comedy videos, Higa began making YouTube videos in 2006 and was one of the most popular creators on the platform in its early years. His main YouTube channel, nigahiga, was the most subscribed channel on YouTube over two periods, a very brief 9 day period in September and October 2008, and a 675 consecutive day period from 2009 to 2011. In 2020, Higa took a hiatus from YouTube and started streaming on Twitch, where he reacts to his past videos and broadcasts video game content, most notably in Valorant.

Higa has won a Shorty Award, has been named Forbes Top 30 Under 30, and has been nominated for three more Shorty Awards, six Streamy Awards, and five Teen Choice Awards.

Outside of his content on YouTube and Twitch, he has also published a memoir Ryan Higa's How to Write Good and appeared in feature films Tell Me How I Die (2016) and Finding 'Ohana (2021).

== Early life ==
Ryan Higa was born in Hilo, Hawaii, on June 6, 1990. He is of Ryukyuan descent, and has an older brother named Kyle. In his youth, Higa competed in judo and holds a black belt. He wrestled at Waiakea High School, from which he graduated in 2008.

Higa studied nuclear medicine at the University of Nevada, Las Vegas, but later dropped out to create online videos.

== YouTube career ==
Higa and Sean Fujiyoshi began posting YouTube videos of themselves lip syncing to songs in mid-2006 while attending Waiakea High School. They quickly expanded beyond songs, with a variety of other comedic pieces. Occasional guest appearances were made by Tim Enos, Ryan Villaruel, Kyle Chun, and Tarynn Nago.

On December 24, 2008, Higa and Fujiyoshi's two most popular videos, How To Be Gangster and How To Be Emo, were removed due to copyright violations. On January 21, 2009, the nigahiga account was temporarily suspended and was required to remove more copyrighted videos. Because of this, nigahiga's lip syncing videos were all removed (with the exception of You're Beautiful, which was audio swapped), along with most of his other videos that included copyrighted music. Since then, Higa started composing the music himself. How to be Gangster and How to be Emo were put back on nigahiga's channel in late August 2009, only to be removed a few days later, along with How to be Ninja and How to be Nerd. In Spring 2010, How to be Ninja, How to be Gangster and How to be Emo were made public once more.

Ninja Melk, a 26-minute short film about ninjas, was released in August 2009. The plot revolves around a ninja master named Master Ching Ching sending his student Lapchung (played by Bryson Murata) to find a replacement, finding Higa and Fujiyoshi to catch the evil Bokchoy (Tim Enos) and his henchwoman, Gina (Tarynn Nago).

An independent 35-minute film he created with Wong Fu Productions called Agents of Secret Stuff was uploaded on the nigahiga channel on November 24, 2010. It features some other popular YouTube users as well as actors such as Aki Aleong. The film follows a teenage A.S.S. (Agent of Secret Stuff) (Higa) who goes undercover as a high school student to protect Taylor (Arden Cho) from the S.I.N.S. (Society Involving Not-So-Good Stuff). It included guest appearances from Ian and Anthony of Smosh, D-Trix, KassemG and Hiimrawn.

When Higa moved to Las Vegas to attend college, most of the nigahiga videos were solo efforts, usually featuring collaborations with other YouTube users. Since 2012, Higa has put together a production company, Ryan Higa Production Company (RHPC), which included Sean Fujiyoshi, that works together to make content for the nigahiga channel. In 2015, Higa's production company was based in a studio in Henderson, Nevada.

In 2016, Higa and other YouTubers and friends created the parody K-pop group Boys Generally Asian. In mid-2018, Fujiyoshi left the group as he was moving out of the area, specifically to Sacramento, California to live with his current girlfriend and to pursue his degree in engineering.

=== Channels ===
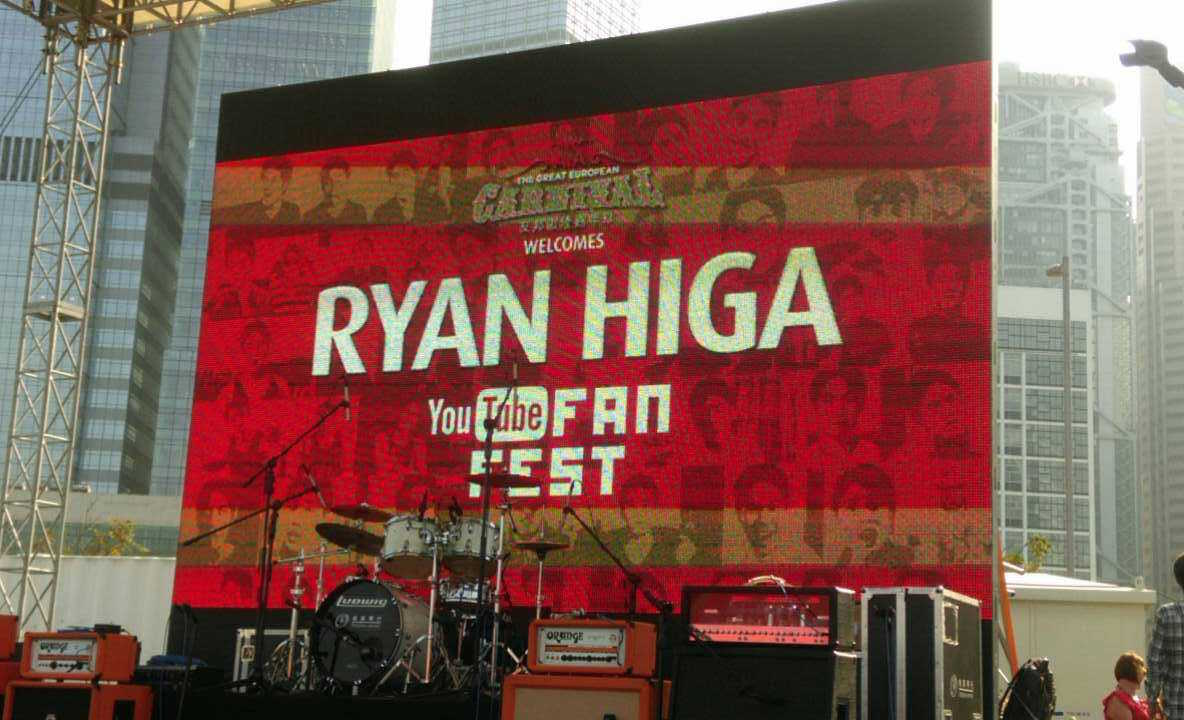
Ryan Higa Meet-and-Greet in Hong Kong YouTube Festival

The nigahiga YouTube channel was created on July 20, 2006, by Higa, Fujiyoshi, Enos, and Nago (known collectively as "The Yabo Crew"). By December 21, 2010, it had reached 3 million subscribers, the first channel to do so. His channel name was derived from a combination of "Niga" and his Okinawan last name, "Higa". Higa had claimed that "Niga" comes from Japanese, meaning rant, despite such a word not existing in Japanese. However, he later revealed that his channel name was actually derived from a desire to encourage people to pronounce his surname correctly. He expressed regret that this may have backfired somewhat, but has refused to change the channel name over the years to avoid the implication that it was ever meant to encourage usage of the term nigga.

In 2011, he created a second channel, under the name HigaTV, where he posts video blogs and behind the scenes videos.

In 2012, Higa helped form the YOMYOMF Network, which hosts the online video-making talent competition, Internet Icon, of which he served alongside Christine Lakin and Timothy DeLaGhetto as main judges.

== Boys Generally Asian ==
In 2016, Ryan Higa created a K-pop band with David Choi, Philip Wang, Jun Sung Ahn and Justin Chon. It was called BgA, standing for Boys Generally Asian, deliberately inspired by the all-female band Girls' Generation. Their first song was called "Dong Saya Dae", which currently has over 16 million views on YouTube. The song was conceived as a general parody of all K-pop songs and featured joke lyrics, but it unexpectedly peaked at no. 2 on the official iTunes K-pop charts. In 2017, BgA released their second song "Who's It Gonna Be", a more serious song than the first, though with the same basis of being a parody. It reached no. 1 on the K-pop charts.

== Film and television ==
In 2008, Los Angeles based producer Richard Van Vleet offered to help them create their first feature-length film. The resulting film, Ryan and Sean's Not So Excellent Adventure, was directed by Richard Van Vleet and released on November 14, 2008. It was shown in sold out theaters in Hawaii and California. The DVD was released on July 14, 2009, in the United States. The film is about a down-on-his-luck movie producer, played by Michael Buckley, who is seeking out famous celebrities in order to make a hit movie in 30 days or risk being fired. He chooses Higa and Fujiyoshi after discovering the popularity of their YouTube videos. He invites them to Hollywood to make a movie. They accept the offer and run into some amusing situations on the way.

Higa has also guest-starred on an episode of Supah Ninjas, playing DJ Elephant Head, a master plotter who uses his hypnotizing electronic music to make people fall asleep to commit robberies.

He appeared in the 2016 horror film Tell Me How I Die and in the 2021 Netflix film Finding 'Ohana.

== Business ventures ==
Victorious Inc. released the "TeeHee" app in April 2015. It was a community hub for fans of Ryan Higa and was monetized through "pre-roll ads, branded content, e-commerce, and in-app purchases." The service was shut down in April 2017.

Higa published his memoir, Ryan Higa's How to Write Good, in 2017.

Higa co-founded Ninja Melk, LLC in 2016 with Kathleen Hahn and Kyle Schroeder. Their titular energy drink launched in May 2019. The drink took three years to develop and is named after Higa's short film of the same name. Higa uploaded a stop motion short film onto the nigahiga YouTube channel on October 19, 2019, to promote the drink.

== Personal life ==
Higa endorsed Andrew Yang for the 2020 Democratic nomination for president. He identifies as an agnostic. He is diagnosed with ADHD. Higa is a fan of the San Francisco 49ers and the San Antonio Spurs.

== Awards and nominations ==
Year	Ceremony	Category	Result	Ref.
2012	4th Shorty Awards	Best in Humor	Won	
2013	3rd Streamy Awards	Personality of the Year	Nominated	
2013	3rd Streamy Awards	Best First-Person Series	Nominated	
2014	4th Streamy Awards	Entertainer of the Year	Nominated	
2014	4th Streamy Awards	Comedy	Nominated	
2014	Young Hollywood Awards	Viral Superstar	Nominated	
2014	6th Shorty Awards	Best Video Blogger	Nominated	
2015	5th Streamy Awards	Comedy	Nominated	
2015	Teen Choice Awards	Choice Male Web Star	Nominated	
2016	6th Streamy Awards	Comedy	Nominated	
2016	Teen Choice Awards	Choice Web Star: Comedy	Nominated	
2016	8th Shorty Awards	YouTube Comedian	Nominated	
2017	Teen Choice Awards	Choice Male Web Star	Nominated	
2017	9th Shorty Awards	YouTuber of the Year	Nominated	
2018	Teen Choice Awards	Choice Male Web Star	Nominated	
2019	Teen Choice Awards	Choice Male Web Star	Nominated	

== Filmography ==
=== Film ===
Year	Title	Role	Notes
2008	Ryan and Sean's Not So Excellent Adventure	Ryan	
2009	Ninja Melk	Ryan / Master Ching Ching / Lapchung	Also director and writer
2010	Agents of Secret Stuff	Aden	Short film
2016	Tell Me How I Die	Scratch	
2021	Finding 'Ohana	Ryan	

=== Television ===
Year	Title	Role	Notes
2010	Supah Ninjas	DJ Elephant Head	Episode: "DJ Elephant Head"

=== Web series ===
Year	Title	Role	Notes
2010	I Heart Vampires	Corbin's Friend	2 episodes
2012	The Book Club	YouTube Ninja	Episode: "Letters of the Dragon"
2013	YouTubers React	Himself	4 episodes
2016	Single by 30	Trevor	Episode: "Hold the Phone!"

== Discography ==
=== Singles ===
Title	Year	Album
"Nice Guys" (featuring Chester See and KevJumba)	2011	Non-album singles
"I'm Hardcore" (featuring David Choi and JR Aquino)	2011	Non-album singles
"Bromance" (featuring Chester See)	2012	Non-album singles
"Clenching My Booty" (featuring D-Trix)	2012	Non-album singles
"What Makes You Successful"	2012	Non-album singles
"Swg" (featuring Golden)	2012	Non-album singles
"Ignored" (featuring David Choi)	2015	Non-album singles
"PreBeardy" (featuring David Choi)	2016	Non-album singles
"Millennial Love" (featuring Kina Grannis)	2017	Non-album singles
"Exposed" (featuring David Choi)	2019	Non-album singles
"8 Grapes" (featuring David Choi)	2018	Non-album singles
"Exposed"	2019	Non-album singles
"Get Introverted"	2019	Non-album singles

Achievements
Preceded by Smosh	Most Subscribed Channel on YouTube; 2008–2008	Succeeded by FЯED
Preceded by FЯED	Most Subscribed Channel on YouTube; 2009–2011	Succeeded by Ray William Johnson
