= Katrina Law =

American actress

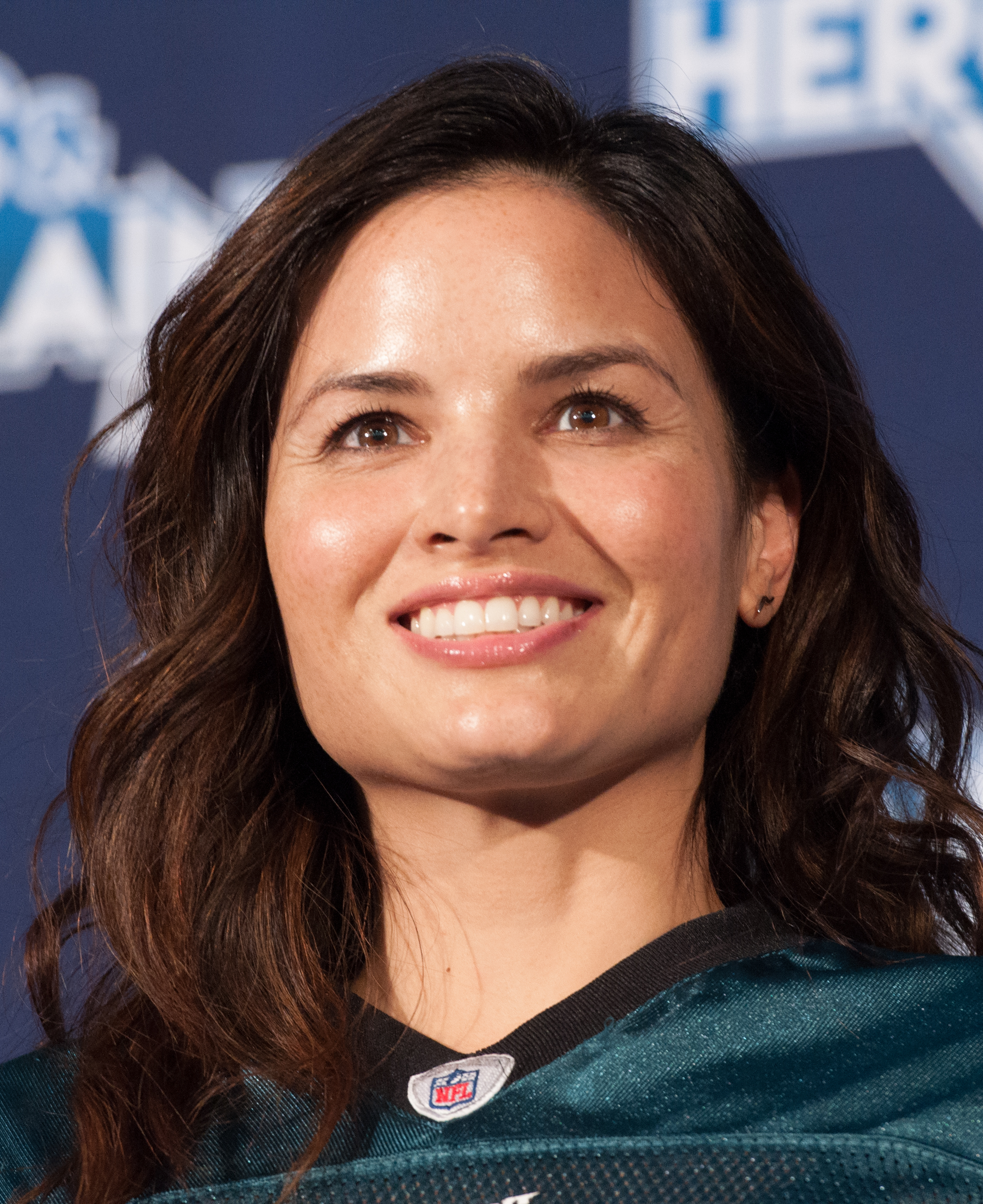
- Law in 2017
- Born: between April 1976 and April 1977; Philadelphia, Pennsylvania, U.S.
- Education: Stockton University (BA)
- Occupation: Actress
- Years active: 2000–present
- Spouse: Keith Andreen (m. 2013; sep. 2025)
- Children: 1

Katrina Law is an American actress. She is known for playing the roles of Mira on the Starz television series Spartacus: Blood and Sand and Spartacus: Vengeance, Nyssa al Ghul on The CW television series Arrow, Karen Beach on the Sony Crackle series The Oath, Quinn Liu on the CBS series Hawaii Five-0, and Jessica Knight on the CBS series NCIS.

== Early life and education ==
Law was born in Philadelphia and grew up in Deptford Township, New Jersey. Her mother is Taiwanese and her father is of German and Italian descent. As a teenager, she was crowned Miss New Jersey Teen USA. She graduated from the Richard Stockton College of New Jersey with a B.A. in Performing Arts (Theatre Performance) in 1999.

== Career ==
Law worked alongside director Adrian Picardi with producers Eric Ro and Don Le, to create a low budget web series called The Resistance. Picardi was the series' official creator and director. The show was later picked up by Starz which led to Law's casting in Spartacus: Blood and Sand in 2009. In 2011, Law completed an action-oriented project called 3 Minutes with director Ross Ching, producers Don Le and George Wang, starring Harry Shum Jr., Stephen "tWitch" Boss (the runner up on season 4 of Fox's So You Think You Can Dance), and herself.

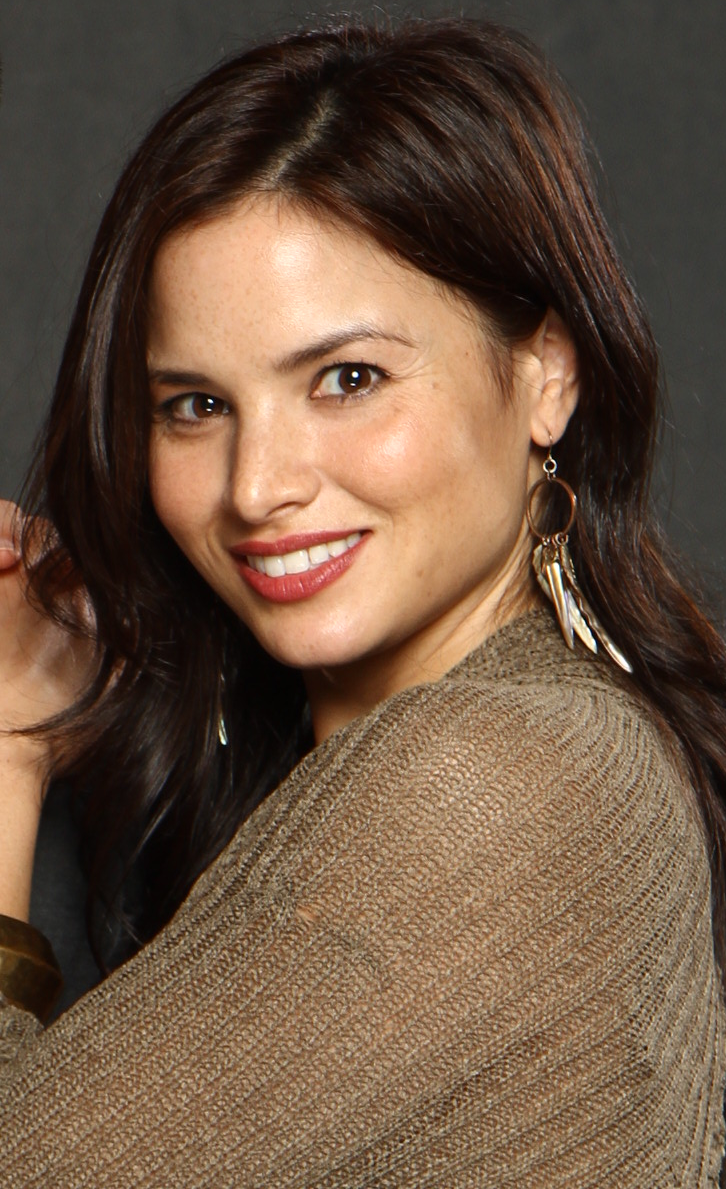
Law in 2014

From 2014 to 2020, she had a recurring role on The CW television series Arrow as Nyssa al Ghul, the daughter of the notorious leader of the League of Assassins, Ra's al Ghul.

In 2019, Law was cast as co-lead in the CBS pilot Alive, as medical examiner Elizabeth Lavenza, whose husband Mark Escher (Ryan Phillipe) is brought back to life by the mysterious Dr Frankenstein (Aaron Staton). Later that year she joined the cast of CBS's Hawaii Five-0 for the series' tenth season. In March 2021, Law was cast in the eighteenth season of NCIS in the role of Jessica Knight. She appeared in the final two episodes of the season with the potential to become a series regular if the series is renewed for a nineteenth season; it was later confirmed that Law would become a series regular beginning with the nineteenth season. In January 2022, it was announced that Law's NCIS character would crossover to NCIS: Hawaiʻi for an episode.

== Personal life ==
Law married actor Keith Andreen in January 2013. In December 2018, she gave birth to their daughter. Law filed for divorce on August 11, 2025.

== Filmography ==
=== Film ===
Year	Title	Role	Notes
2000	Lucky Numbers	Teen Girl	also known as Lucky Number (Japan: English title)
2001	Bottomfeeders	Ursula	
2002	Emmett's Mark	Francine	also known as Killing Emmett Young (video title)
2005	Choker	Santo	also known as Disturbance (DVD box title)
2006	All In	Dealer No. 1	
2007	A New Tomorrow	Katherine Schatz	
2008	Stiletto	Biker Chick No. 2	Direct-to-video film; also known as Velvet Spider (Japan: English title)
2009	Alpha Males Experiment	Jenna	originally titled Knuckle Draggers
2010	The Grind	Jemma	
2011	3 Minutes	Female Hunter	Short film
2015	Death Valley	Annie Gunn	
2015	Checkmate	Katana	
2017	Darkness Rising	Izzy	
2024	Werewolves	Dr. Amy Chen	
TBA	Mafiosa	Alex Johnson	produced in 2010, but not released

=== Television ===
Year	Title	Role	Notes
2001	Third Watch	Ani Bailey	Episode: "Man Enough"
2002	Reba	Morgan Brooks	Episode: "The King and I"
2003	44 Minutes: The North Hollywood Shoot-Out	Kate	Television movie
2006	If You Lived Here, You'd Be Home Now	N/A	Television movie
2007	The Rookie: CTU	Kate Wyman	Web series (spin-off of 24); main role (season 3), 6 episodes
2009	Chuck	Alexis	Episode: "Chuck Versus the Beefcake"
2010	Spartacus: Blood and Sand	Mira	Recurring role, 5 episodes
2010	Legend of the Seeker	Garren the Mord Sith	Episodes: "Walter", "Extinction", and "Tears"
2010	The Resistance	Lana	Web series; main role, 8 episodes
2012	Spartacus: Vengeance	Mira	Main role, 10 episodes
2012	CSI: Miami	"Assassin"	Episode: "Law and Disorder"
2013	Chosen	Amber	2 episodes
2013	Snow Bride	Greta Kaine	Television movie (Hallmark Channel)
2014–2020	Arrow	Nyssa al Ghul	Recurring role, 20 episodes
2015	12 Gifts of Christmas	Anna Parisi	Television movie (Hallmark Channel)
2015	Guilt	Natalie	Original television pilot (unaired)
2016	Legends of Tomorrow	Nyssa al Ghul	Episode: "River of Time"
2017	Training Day	Detective Rebecca Lee	Main role
2018–2019	The Oath	Karen Beach	Main role
2018–2020	Sacred Lies	Miss Bailey	Recurring role
2019–2020	Hawaii Five-0	Quinn Liu	Main role (season 10)
2020	Magnum P.I.	Quinn Liu	Episode: "Desperate Measures"
2020	Christmas with the Darlings	Jessica Lew	Television movie (Hallmark Channel)
2021–present	NCIS	Jessica Knight	Guest role (season 18); main role (season 19–present)
2022	NCIS: Hawaiʻi	Jessica Knight	Guest role, 2 episodes
