= Adrian Zaw =

American actor (born 1984)

- Born: Kyi Maung Zaw; May 7, 1984 (age 42); Burma
- Education: Gabrielino High School; Pasadena City College; University of Southern California
- Occupation: Actor/Producer/Owner of Zawstudios

Adrian Zaw (born May 7, 1984) is an American actor best known for his role of Syrus Primoris on the science fiction television series The Resistance on the SyFy channel.

== Career ==
Adrian Zaw has worked with web series producer Andy Dugan for the web series "Satacracy 88" as the character of "Ariel Zim". The series took home the first-ever Emmy for Outstanding Broadband Drama of 2007 for a Web Series. That same year, the series won the Webby Award for Best Dramatic Online Film and Video.

Soon after, he found himself working alongside director Adrian Picardi, whom he introduced to producers Don Le and Eric Ro, which led them all to create a low-budget web series called The Resistance. Picardi was the series' official creator and director. The series started off as 4 short online teasers featured on YouTube. On the show, he plays the main villain, Syrus Primoris, the ruler of a nation called Aurordeca in the pursuit of immortality. The only thing standing in his way is a band of freedom fighters called "ARM Members". Before filming the actual web show, the series was picked up by Sam Raimi’s Ghost House Pictures and Starz Media, after executives at Starz and Ghost House viewed "The Resistance" teasers online. The web show airs on October 4, 2010, on the SyFy channel as a one-hour television pilot along with being released in its original 8 episodic form on iTunes, Xbox Live, and the PlayStation Network. "The Resistance" is executive produced by Ben Ketai, Scott Bayless, Scott Rogers, with producers Aaron Lam, Eric Ro, and Associate Producer Don Le. The pilot will reportedly make history, as it's the first time a series created originally for the web will first premiere on television.

In 2010, under the Teddy Zee Productions banner, Zaw produced a series of charity PSA videos alongside Teddy Zee (Hitch/Pursuit of Happyness), Don Le, and APEX and invitation-only social network Privy.net founder Stephen Liu. He helped produce the 20+ clips that featured Asian American celebrities like John Cho, Sandra Oh, Kaba Modern Legacy, Justin Chon, David Choi, and 100+ talents in a campaign to win $1 million for the Center for the Pacific Asian Family (CPAF). The charity ended up in the top 20 out of 100 charities competing for the top prize, and ended up creating awareness for the widespread but generally unspoken issues of sexual assault and domestic violence.

In September 2010, he produced videos for the first ever AAPI Rock the Vote 2010 campaign with Teddy Zee, Don Le, and George Wang.

Currently, Zaw works alongside numerous production companies including Fusion3 Media to produce projects of all kinds.

== Filmography ==
- The Resistance (2010) -- Syrus Primoris
- Lovebot (2009) -- Adrian Lee
- Hollywood Confidential (2008) -- Tiger
- Retribution (2007) – Gorgan
- Satacracy 88 (2007) – Ariel Zim
- The Kiss (2007) – Jerry
- Fright Club (2006) – Detective Frank N. Shan
- Anesthesia (2006) – Nurse
- American Dreamz (2006) – Video Audition
