= Steven Liu =

Steven Liu or Stephen Liu may refer to:

== Steven Liu ==
- Liu Wen-cheng (born 1952), Taiwanese singer and actor
- Liu Chia-chang (1940s–2024), Taiwanese singer-songwriter, actor, director, and screenwriter

== Stephen Liu ==
- Stephen Garlock Liu (born 1992), Australian footballer
- Stephen Liu, American internet entrepreneur, media executive and philanthropist
