= Three minutes =

Three minutes may refer to:

- Three-minute warning in Canadian football
- 3 Minutes, a 2010 action film
- "Three Minutes", a 2006 episode of Lost
- Three Minutes: A Lengthening, a 2022 documentary film

== See also ==
- Three minutes to midnight
- Three Minutes to Earth song by Georgian jazz band The Shin and Georgian singer Mariko Ebralidze
- The First Three Minutes 1977 book by American physicist Steven Weinberg
