= List of Chosen episodes =

Chosen (stylized onscreen as CH:OS:EN accompanied by a ticking sound) is an American action thriller drama television series/web series from Ben Ketai and Ryan Lewis, airing via online streaming video service Crackle. The first season consisted of eight episodes released simultaneously, on January 17, 2013. On April 30, 2014, Crackle renewed the series for a fourth season, which has yet to air. As of April 15, 2014, 18 episodes of Chosen have aired, concluding the third season.

== Series overview ==
Season	Episodes	Originally aired	
Season	Episodes	First aired	Last aired
1	6	January 17, 2013	January 17, 2013
2	6	December 12, 2013	December 26, 2013
3	6	April 15, 2014	April 15, 2014

== Episodes ==
=== Season 1 (2013) ===
No. overall	No. in season	Title	Directed by	Written by	Original release date
1	1	"The Box"	Ben Ketai	Ben Ketai	January 17, 2013
2	2	"The Hunters"	Ben Ketai	Ben Ketai	January 17, 2013
3	3	"The Fixers"	Ben Ketai	Ben Ketai	January 17, 2013
4	4	"The Watchers"	Ben Ketai	Ben Ketai	January 17, 2013
5	5	"The Cavalry"	Ben Ketai	Ben Ketai	January 17, 2013
6	6	"The Way Out"	Ben Ketai	Ben Ketai	January 17, 2013

=== Season 2 (2013) ===
No. overall	No. in season	Title	Directed by	Written by	Original release date
7	1	"Second Chances"	Ben Ketai	Ben Ketai, Ryan Lewis, Evan Charnov	December 12, 2013
8	2	"Heroes and Villains"	Ben Ketai	Ben Ketai, Ryan Lewis, Evan Charnov	December 12, 2013
9	3	"Right At Your Door"	Ben Ketai	Ben Ketai, Ryan Lewis, Evan Charnov	December 19, 2013
10	4	"Killers"	Ben Ketai	Ben Ketai, Ryan Lewis, Evan Charnov	December 19, 2013
11	5	"Collision Course"	Ben Ketai	Ben Ketai, Ryan Lewis, Evan Charnov	December 26, 2013
12	6	"Protect Your Own"	Ben Ketai	Ben Ketai, Ryan Lewis, Evan Charnov	December 26, 2013

=== Season 3 (2014) ===
No. overall	No. in season	Title	Directed by	Written by	Original release date
13	1	"Redemption"	Toby Wilkins	Ben Ketai & Evan Charnov	April 15, 2014
14	2	"Dirty Hands"	Toby Wilkins	Ben Ketai & Evan Charnov	April 15, 2014
15	3	"The Hatchet"	Toby Wilkins	Ben Ketai & Evan Charnov	April 15, 2014
16	4	"Prisoners"	Toby Wilkins	Ben Ketai & Evan Charnov	April 15, 2014
17	5	"Downward Spiral"	Toby Wilkins	Ben Ketai & Evan Charnov	April 15, 2014
18	6	"Monsters"	Toby Wilkins	Ben Ketai & Evan Charnov	April 15, 2014

=== Season 4 ===
On April 30, 2014, Crackle announced they had renewed the series for a fourth season. It was initially scheduled to premiere in the winter of 2016, but on June 20, 2016, Milo Ventimiglia tweeted there is a slim chance the series will actually make a return.
