= Teddy Zee =

Chinese film producer/executive

- Occupations: Producer/Media & Technology Executive
- Website: http://www.teddyzee.com/

Teddy Zee
- Traditional Chinese: 徐俠昌
- Simplified Chinese: 徐侠昌
Transcriptions
Standard Mandarin
- Hanyu Pinyin: Xú Xiáchāng

Teddy Zee is a Chinese film producer/executive whose films he had produced and supervised have amassed over $2.6 billion in revenue. He was an Executive Vice President at Columbia Pictures, Senior Vice President at Paramount Pictures, President of Sony-based Overbrook Films, President of Fox-based Davis Entertainment, and now under the banner of Teddy Zee Productions. He is a member of Academy of Motion Picture Arts & Sciences (Oscars), Academy of Television Arts & Sciences (Emmys) and Producers Guild of America. In addition to film and entertainment, Zee has built an active consulting and advisory practice that spans media, technology and commerce while bridging Hollywood with Asia.

Zee is a venture partner in Xcelerate Limited, an investment platform focused on building lifestyle companies in China and Asia and the affiliated Magic Concepts Asia. Zee has guest programmed foreign shows for the Shanghai TV Festival and worked with GSMA to help program entertainment and media related content at Mobile World Congress: Shanghai.

Zee is Executive Advisor for ObEN, an Artificial Intelligence start-up with proprietary voice and computer vision software that humanizes technology. Other advisory roles include SmartStudy, the Korean animation and games company with a global footprint driven by the character Pinkfong; SparkLabs Songdo, a 6-month accelerator program for IoT based in Korea; ParagonOne, a platform that connects foreign students with a network of mentors and advisors in the US; and Lifesite, a cloud-based secure storage system for life’s most important documents. Other advisory roles have included: Meitu, the Chinese photo and video app company that went IPO in Hong Kong in December 2016; ThinOptics, a startup that delivers lightweight and durable reading glasses that store on the back of smartphone cases; Starmaker, a tech driven media company focused on music and discovering new stars (acquired August 2016); and Ooyala, a leading online video platform company acquired by Telstra in August 2014. Zee served as Head of Creative, Mobile Technologies Division for Rambus. They acquired Silicon Valley interactive media start-up Mozaik Multimedia, where Zee held the post of Chief Creative Officer.

In partnership with Fusion 3 Media, Zee optioned the Vietnamese format rights to the Warner Bros. reality TV show The Bachelor. Zee managed a successful marketing, promotions and licensing collaboration between Chinese fashion retailer Semir and Marvel Studios on Iron Man 2. He was executive producer/consultant on Quantum Quest, a 3-D, CGI animated film for Taiwan’s Digimax in cooperation with NASA and Jet Propulsion Lab. Zee executive produced Mashbox for Myx TV, which was nominated for the NAMIC Vision Awards 2013 in the category of Digital Media – Long Form. He also supported Japanese pop star Jin Akanishi’s US debut in 2012 by executive producing the web series Jin Akanishi: The Takeover.

Zee serves as Consultant for Novitaz, a company with patented software that enables in-store ad networks for retailers; Advisor for Channel Factory, an ad tech start-up that helps brands and content owners reach, build and engage target audiences; Advisor for ThinOptics, a startup that delivers lightweight and durable reading glasses that store on the back of smartphone cases; Advisor for mobile app template developer Veam; Advisor for Ooyala, a leading online video platform company acquired by Telstra; and Mentor/Advisor for startups associated with the Korean incubator SparkLabs.

Zee was Executive Producer of The Pursuit of Happyness, a Columbia Pictures film starring Will Smith. The film has earned $300 million in worldwide ticket sales. Zee produced West 32nd, a CJ Entertainment film starring John Cho, Grace Park and Jeong Jun-Ho. It was one of 18 films selected for World Narrative Competition at the 2007 Tribeca Film Festival. In 2005, Zee produced Hitch, a Columbia Pictures release starring Will Smith, Eva Mendes and Kevin James that earned over $365 million in worldwide ticket sales. He also produced Saving Face starring Joan Chen, official selections of the Sundance and Toronto Film Festivals. It won the 2005 Golden Horse Audience Award, Taiwan's Oscar equivalent. Previously, as President of Davis Entertainment, Zee was the Executive Producer of Life or Something Like It, a New Regency release starring Angelina Jolie.

Zee is the Executive Producer of the annual Asian Excellence Awards broadcast on E! and AZN-TV to 100 million homes in the US. He also was the Executive Producer of the talk show DIM SUM WITH TEDDY ZEE and IVY DREAMS, a documentary that follows four Asian-American high school seniors pursuing Ivy League college admissions. Both were for AZN-TV. Zee executed produced Quantum Quest: A Cassini Space Odyssey, an animated, 3D, large format movie that for Taiwan's Digimax. The film was made in cooperation with NASA and Jet Propulsion Lab (JPL).

As Executive Vice President of Production at Columbia Pictures, Zee oversaw such films as Charlie's Angels, The Replacement Killers, Anaconda, Fools Rush In, The Devil's Own, The Cable Guy, First Knight, My Girl, Mo' Money, Hero, and Sleepwalkers. He championed Chow Yun Fat's Hollywood debut. His project Charlie's Angels was a feature film springboard for Lucy Liu; the movie grossed $264 million worldwide and spawned a sequel. He worked with Hong Kong filmmakers John Woo, Stephen Chow and Ringo Lam. As Senior VP of Productions at Paramount Pictures, he shepherded such films as Indecent Proposal, Star Trek VI: The Undiscovered Country, Cousins and The Presidio.

Zee has an M.B.A. from Harvard University and a B.S. from Cornell University, School of Industrial & Labor Relations. As a member of Committee of 100, an organization of Chinese Americans who have achieved prominence in their respective fields, he co-founded the C-100 Leadership and Mentoring Program. He is also a longtime member of AMPAS (the Executive branch of the Academy Awards), a former member of the Executive Board of the Asian American Policy Review at Harvard's JFK School of Government, a board member of Coalition for Asian Pacifics in Entertainment (CAPE), and a member of the Television Academy and a board member of Koreatown Youth + Community Center in Los Angeles.

The Asian Professional Exchange (APEX) honored Zee with the 2007 Award for Excellence in the Arts and Entertainment and KCET, PBS' Los Angeles affiliate named him "Local Hero" in 2005 for his contributions to the Asian American community. Goldsea, the Asian American Supersite, recognized his efforts in creating positive film roles for Asian actors in Hollywood by placing him No. 54 on "The 120 Most Inspiring Asian Americans of All Time".

In 2010, under the Teddy Zee Productions banner, Zee produced a series of charity PSA videos alongside Don Le, George Wang, Adrian Zaw, and APEX and invitation-only social network Privy.net founder Stephen Liu. He executive produced the 20+ clips that featured Asian American celebrities like John Cho, Sandra Oh, Kaba Modern Legacy, Justin Chon, David Choi, and 100+ talents in a campaign to win $1 million for the Center for the Pacific Asian Family (CPAF). The charity ended up in the top 20 out of 100 charities competing for the top prize, and ended up creating awareness for the widespread but generally unspoken issues of sexual assault and domestic violence. | | | In September 2010, he also served as Executive Producer for the video coverage on the first ever AAPI Rock the Vote 2010 campaign with doctor Paul Song, Roy Choi, George Wang, Don Le, and Adrian Zaw. In May 2012, Zee produced an interactive news magazine show called MashBox for Asian American cable network Myx TV.
