= The Resistance (series) =

2010 American web series

The Resistance is a 2010 American science fiction web series created and directed by Adrian Picardi.

== Plot ==
The Resistance is set in a world where brilliant chemist Syrus Primoris (Adrian Zaw) has taken control in the wake of a devastating plague virus that has killed 99% of the population. Only Primoris’ suppressant, called Noxe, keeps the survivors from succumbing to the plague. One group opposes his regime and fights to find another cure.

== Production ==
The Resistance started off as a low budget web series in the form of four short online teasers featured on YouTube. Before filming the actual web show, the series was picked up by Sam Raimi's Ghost House Pictures and Starz Media, after executives at Starz and Ghost House viewed "The Resistance" teasers online. The pilot was the first time a series created originally for the web premiered on television.

The web show aired on October 4, 2010, on the SyFy channel as a one-hour television pilot along with being released in its original eight episodic form on iTunes, Xbox Live, and the PlayStation Network, and Dailymotion. "The Resistance" was directed and created by Adrian Picardi, executive produced by Ben Ketai, Scott Bayless, Scott Rogers, with producers Aaron Lam, Eric Ro, and associate producer Don Le.
