= Manon Mathews =

American actress

- Born: Los Angeles, California, U.S.
- Education: Santa Barbara City College
- Years active: 2012–present
- Website: manonmathews.com

Manon Mathews is an American comedian, actress, and social media personality. She is best known for her videos on Vine and her appearances in film and television.

== Early life and education ==
Manon was born and raised in Los Angeles. She studied theatre, dance, and film production at Santa Barbara City College.

== Career ==
She began her professional career at Second City Conservatory, the Groundlings and Upright Citizens Brigade.

Mathews rose to prominence on the video app Vine where she ultimately amassed a fan base of over 3,000,000 followers and accrued over 1,400,000,000 loops until Vine was unceremoniously shuttered. She became one of the USA's top performing members of the burgeoning subset of online entertainers known as 'Vine Stars' that dominated the app before it became defunct.

=== Comedy ===
As a stand-up comedian, she has appeared at Dad's Garage in Atlanta, Georgia, SF Sketchfest, and the 2018 Montreal Just For Laughs Festival, as part of its 'New Faces Of Comedy' program.

=== Acting ===
She appeared as supporting actress in the feature films Welcome to Forever, FML, and starred as Chloe in the 2016 film Holiday Breakup, which was written and directed by her father, Temple Mathews. She has also appeared in Broad City, Single by 30, and Sorry Not Sorry.

As a talent, she has appeared in advertisements for Bud Light and also partnered with brands such as T-Mobile, Best Buy, Diet Coke, Toyota, and McDonald's.
