= Dawen =

American singer-songwriter (born 1981)

Dawen 王大文
- Born: Dawen Wang; October 28, 1981 (age 45)
- Origin: Chicago, IL
- Genres: Soul, R&B, Neo-soul, Funk
- Occupation: Singer-songwriter
- Instrument: vocals
- Years active: 2007–present
- Website: dawen.us

Dawen Wang (Chinese: 王大文; pinyin: Wáng Dàwén), known as Dawen, is an American singer and songwriter. He first gained prominence when he won Kollaboration Acoustic 4. Dawen's first single "Wake Up", deals with Asian American stereotypes and prejudice towards minorities.

Dawen became popular for translating famous popular songs into Chinese on YouTube, with his Mandarin cover of Rebecca Black's "Friday" becoming a viral runaway hit in 2011.

== Early life ==
Born in Cambridge, Massachusetts on October 28, 1981, Dawen grew up in Lexington, Massachusetts and attended Lexington High School as a freshman. At the age of 14, Dawen moved to Hong Kong to reside with his mother, attending Sha Tin College.

Dawen returned to the United States to study at Northwestern University. He majored in English and vocal performance. After graduation, he worked at Starbucks for two years.

His brother George Wang, is a new media and TV producer based in Los Angeles, California.

== Career ==
Dawen first appeared on the music scene as an indie artist in the mid-late 2000s. He started off in Chicago, Illinois, playing at open mics and at various music venues. In the fall of 2008, he decided to move to Los Angeles, upon the advice of his brother George, to further pursue his music career.

In late 2009, he released his debut album, "American Me" and followed soon after with a tour including stops in Taiwan and Hong Kong. In August 2010, Dawen entered the talent show Kollaboration and emerged the Grand Prize Winner, increasing his prominence and exposure online.

His translations of American pop songs, such as Rebecca Black - "Friday" and Backstreet Boys - "I Want It That Way", have turned into YouTube hits. His brother shot a music video for his a cappella cover of Bruno Mars - "Just the Way You Are" in 2011. The video was uploaded onto YouTube, where it caught the attention of Universal Music Taiwan. Dawen later moved to Taiwan in 2012 to sign with Universal Music Taiwan.

Although Dawen grew up speaking Mandarin, he was not fluent in the language. Upon moving to Taiwan, he took an intensive Mandarin course. He released his first Mandarin language album "Hello" at the end of 2013. Dawen was awarded Most Popular New Artist at the Singapore Hit Awards in November 2014.

Dawen's first Mandarin single, "A Change of Heart" ("回心轉意") debuted in episode 9 on the Taiwanese idol drama, Lady Maid Maid (愛情女僕), broadcast on SETTV. It has been regularly featured on subsequent episodes and has since been released as part of a fourteen song TV soundtrack compilation, available as a digital download on Taiwan-based KKBox.

== Discography ==
=== Studio albums ===
- American Me (2009)
- Hello (2013)
- Happy Or Not (2015)
- The International Space Station (2019)
