= Single by 30 =

Romantic comedy web television series

- Genre: Romantic comedy
- Directed by: Wesley Chan; Philip Wang
- Starring: Harry Shum Jr.; Kina Grannis; Eric Ochoa; Hillary Anne Matthews; Manon Mathews; Anna Akana
- Composer: Frank Cogliano
- Country of origin: United States
- Original language: English
- No. of seasons: 1
- No. of episodes: 8

Production
- Production company: Wong Fu Productions

Original release
- Network: YouTube Red
- Release: August 24 – October 4, 2016

Single by 30 is an original romantic comedy series created by Wong Fu Productions. The series was launched on YouTube Red on August 24, 2016. The focal point of the show follows the intertwining stories of two young adults Peter (Harry Shum Jr.) and Joanna (Kina Grannis), who once made a promise to get married if they were still single by the age of 30. On April 10, 2017, actor Harry Shum Jr. confirmed on his Twitter account that the series would not return for a second season.

== Plot ==
In their senior year of high school, Peter and Joanna make a pact to go to their senior dance together if they fail to invite their desired dates. As this provides a back-up plan, this encourages them to invite a date despite the risk of being rejected. Joanna succeeds in wooing her date while Peter fails. They meet up after the dance, and they make another pact: to get married if they are both still single at the age of 30. This will encourage them to take more chances and put themselves out in the world.

After high school, the two lose touch. But after 12 years, the two coincidentally reconnect just before turning 30. They have both recently broken up with their separate partners. Disillusioned with life, they decide to reinstate their pact to ease the process of re-entering the dating game. Their friends Mark and Chloe fall for each other and add a new dynamic to Peter's and Joanna's love lives. However, Peter and Joanna fight mixed feelings as they traverse their relationships both with new partners and with each other.

== Cast ==
- Harry Shum Jr. as Peter Ma
- Kina Grannis as Joanna Taylor
- Hillary Anne Matthews as Chloe
- Eric Ochoa as Mark
- Manon Mathews as Lisa
- Alexandra Metz as Sarah
- Anna Akana as Grace
- Barry Rothbart as Ryan
- Ryan Higa as Trevor

The series features an ethnically "diverse group of actors to reflect the culture of Los Angeles, where the story is set." NPR writes that it's a "solidly refreshing confection... when you throw in how rare it's been for diverse casts and Asian-American leading men in particular to find spots in widely released romantic comedies."

== Production ==
The series began with a pilot episode as a part of New Form Digital's Incubator Series 2. However, the pilot episode became so popular that YouTube adopted it as an original YouTube Red series and green-lit an entire 8 episode season. Enabled by its budget from YouTube Red, Single by 30 marked the first time a Wong Fu Production has been written by anyone other than its founders. Released as an official YouTube Red series (Now YouTube Premium) on August 24, 2016, the first episode was free while the remaining episodes were only available with a YouTube Red subscription. On April 22, 2020, Wong Fu Productions announced via their YouTube channel that all episodes of the series were available for everyone to stream for free.

== Episodes ==
Episode	Title	Length	Release date
1	"Too Fast, Too Thirteous"	25:02	August 24, 2016
During their senior year of high school, Peter Ma and Joanna Taylor made a pact to get married if they were still single by 30. After losing touch for 12 years, Joanna re-enters Peter's life coincidentally at his 30th birthday party. They were both recently broken up with their own significant partners and were confronted with the unsettled reality of their lives, they decide to reinstate the pact to improve their dating lives through encouraging each other to take more chances and put themselves out into the world.
2	"Dot Dot Dot"	24:57	August 24, 2016
Joanna attempts to spice up her love life by trying out a dating app while Peter tries to meet girls IRL. While Joanna attempts to find someone through her matches at coffee dates, Peter tries to talk to girls at a gym. Getting mixed results, they decide to swipe for each other and set up blind dates.
3	"Hold the Phone!"	25:09	August 31, 2016
Peter and Joanna revisit their college years when they see Grace's debut as a DJ at a frat party. Peter encourages Grace as she is nervous about the influx of people at the party and takes his relationship with Sarah to the next level. Mark and Chloe take their mind games to the next level after deciding they don't want to be exclusive.
4	"Never Have I Ever"	24:38	September 6, 2016
Joanna reconnects with her ex Carl as Peter tries to impress Sarah's friends. After a vague call from Carl before his wedding, Joanna decides to meet up with him. Joanna crashes the party drunk and reveals to Sarah about the pact. After Peter decides to take Joanna home from the party, Sarah and Peter decide to stop their relationship. Mark and Chloe attempt to take their relationship to the next level, by going on an "official" date.
5	"All My Life"	25:21	September 14, 2016
At Joanna's ex's wedding, Joanna has an epiphany about Peter while helping Allison with her pre-wedding jitters, while Peter takes full advantage of his status as "the single guy at a wedding" talking to lady guests. After Peter realizes he missed the song that Joanna sang, he goes to find her and they confirm each other's feelings through a kiss.
6	"First, First Date"	22:06	September 21, 2016
After waking up the next morning, Joanna and Peter struggle to move their relationship from best friends to being a couple. To combat her cold feet, Joanna and Peter go on a "first date" and reset each other's expectations. Mark has to meet Lisa, who has never approved of any of Chloe's boyfriends. After meeting Chloe's friends, Mark was promoted to 'boyfriend' after Lisa's approval.
7	"Moving In and Moving On"	24:38	September 28, 2016
Peter and Joanna pause when it comes time to define their relationship. After Joanna takes some encouragement from her mom, she decides to take a chance on the relationship with Peter but misses her chance when Peter decides to talk to Sarah again. Mark and Chloe move in together and immediately wonder if they made a huge mistake.
8	"Single at 30"	24:49	October 4, 2016
Joanna's 30th birthday is fast approaching. Peter looks to make a major life change while Mark tries to infuse some drama back into the relationship with Chloe. Mark later surprises Chloe with a heartfelt proposal at a bar in celebration of their relationship. After Lisa sends a video of Joanna singing at Carl's and Allison's wedding to Peter, Peter and Joanna reaffirm their feelings.

== Awards and nominations ==
Year	Award	Category	Nominee	Result	Reference
2018	Artios Awards	Outstanding achievement in casting - Short form series	Sherrie Henderson Romy Stutman Vanessa Knight (associate)	Nominee	
2017	The Streamy Awards	Best drama series	Single by 30	Nominee	
2017	The Streamy Awards	Best acting in a drama	Harry Shum Jr.	Nominee	
2017	The Streamy Awards	Best direction	Wesley Chan Philip Wang	Nominee	

== Soundtrack ==
George Shaw released the official soundtrack on June 16, 2015. Shaw both composed and performed the instrumental soundtrack for the series.

All tracks are written by George Shaw.

No.	Title	Length
1.	"Backup Dates"	:24
2.	"Grandchild Question"	:57
3.	"Going To Ask"	1:41
4.	"I Offered You Strippers"	:44
5.	"Rooftop Reunion"	3:03
6.	"Unexpected Invitation"	:24
7.	"Don't Forget Our Promise"	:26
8.	"By The Time We're Thirty"	2:40
