= Harry Shum Jr. =

American actor (born 1982)

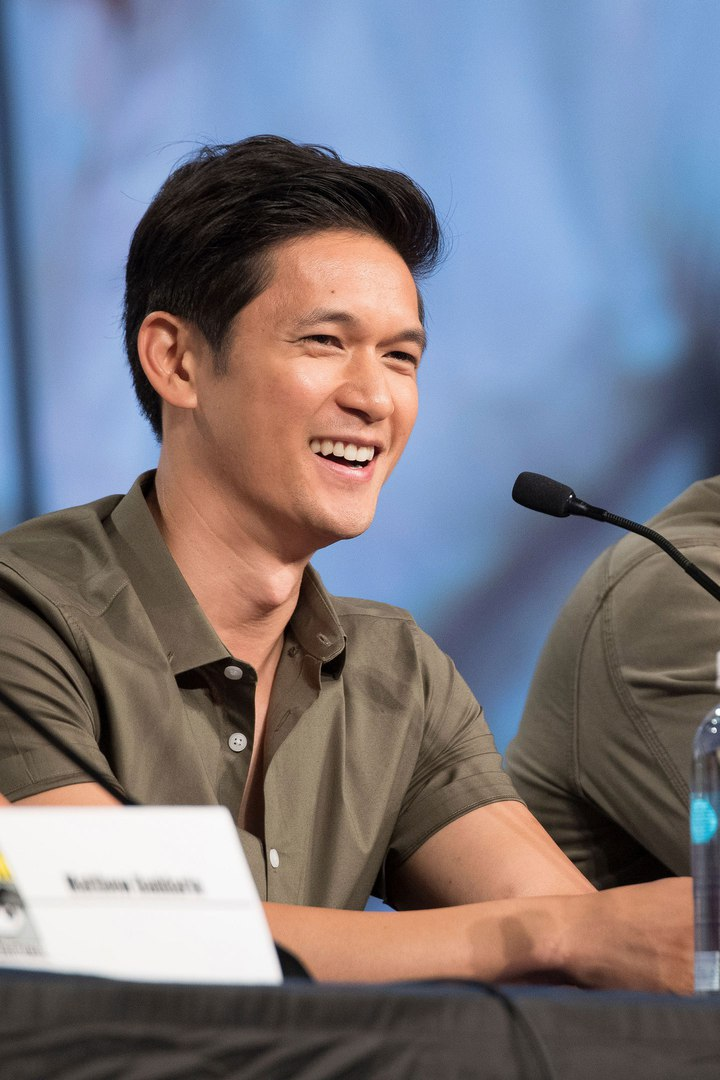
- Shum in 2017
- Born: April 28, 1982 (age 44); Limón, Costa Rica
- Occupations: Actor; dancer
- Years active: 2000–present
- Height: 6 ft 0 in 183 cm
- Spouse: Shelby Rabara (m. 2015)
- Children: 1

Chinese name
- Chinese: 岑勇康
Transcriptions
Standard Mandarin
- Hanyu Pinyin: Cén Yǒngkāng
Yue: Cantonese
- Yale Romanization: Sàhm Yúhnghōng
- Jyutping: sam4 jung5 hong1
- Website: www.harryshumjr.com

Signature
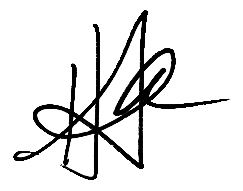

Harry Shum Jr. (Chinese: 岑勇康; pinyin: Cén Yǒngkāng, born April 28, 1982) is an American actor and dancer. He is best known for his roles as Mike Chang on the Fox television series Glee (2009–2015), Magnus Bane on the Freeform television series Shadowhunters (2016–2019), and Dr. Benson Kwan on the ABC television series Grey's Anatomy (2022–present). He was nominated for six Screen Actors Guild Awards for best ensemble performance in Crazy Rich Asians, Glee and Everything Everywhere All at Once, winning for the latter two. Shum won The Male TV Star of 2018 award in the E! People's Choice Awards for Shadowhunters.

Shum has appeared in the films Step Up 2: The Streets (2008), Step Up 3D (2010), White Frog (2012), Revenge of the Green Dragons (2014), Crouching Tiger, Hidden Dragon: Sword of Destiny (2016), Crazy Rich Asians (2018), the Hulu web series The Legion of Extraordinary Dancers (2010–2011) and the YouTube Originals series Single by 30 (2016). In 2020, he starred in Universal Pictures's romantic drama All My Life. In 2021, Shum starred in the thriller Broadcast Signal Intrusion and appeared in Netflix's holiday rom-com Love Hard. In 2022, Shum had a supporting role in A24's critically acclaimed film Everything Everywhere All at Once, and is set to star in a Crazy Rich Asians spinoff centered around his and Gemma Chan's characters.

== Early life ==
Shum was born in Limón, Costa Rica, the son of Chinese immigrants. His mother is a native of Hong Kong, and his father is from Enping, China. They relocated to Costa Rica, where Shum and his two older sisters were born. When Shum was six years old, the family moved to San Francisco, California. He stated, "I feel I have the best of so many worlds. I speak Spanish and Cantonese. Spanish is actually my first language before I learned Cantonese and English." He later stated that he has not spoken Spanish fluently since the age of 6.

Shum spent most of his schooling years in San Luis Obispo County, California, and graduated from Arroyo Grande High School in 2000. Initially, he had been more interested in theater and sports but found a passion for dance after auditioning for his high school dance team on a dare. Shum attended San Francisco State University for a year, before dropping out to pursue a dance career. In an interview, he said that his earliest motivations to dance were from watching Ginuwine, Dru Hill, and Usher before becoming influenced by dancers like Gene Kelly and Michael Jackson.

== Career ==
=== 2002–2007: Dancer beginnings ===
Shum began his dance career in Los Angeles. As an 18-year-old, he was spotted by choreographers Rosero McCoy and Jamal Sims to go on a UK tour with the singer Kaci. He steadily built his career, appearing as the only male dancer on BET's ComicView, and starred in a series of iPod advertisements as dancing silhouettes. He joined Beyoncé, Alicia Keys, and Missy Elliott in their co-headlining tour Ladies First in 2004, while working as a backup dancer for artists including Jennifer Lopez, Jessica Simpson, and Mariah Carey. He appeared in several music videos of songs including Lose My Breath by Destiny's Child and "It's Like That" by Mariah Carey. Shum also worked as a dance instructor.

=== 2008–2014: Turn to acting, Glee, The LXD ===
Since 2008, Shum was given roles in Step Up 2 and later Step Up 3D, both directed by Jon M. Chu. From 2009 until 2015, he portrayed the role of Mike Chang, a dancer who joins the glee club, on the Fox musical comedy-drama series Glee. Known for a while as "Other Asian" on Glee, he was given very few lines during the show's first season. Partly due to the enthusiasm from fans during his appearances on the live tour taking place after the first season concluded, Shum's character was given storylines in the second season, mostly involving his relationship with fellow glee club member Tina Cohen-Chang (Jenna Ushkowitz). He subsequently gave performances of "Make 'Em Laugh" in "The Substitute", "Sing" from A Chorus Line in "Duets", "Valerie" in "Special Education", and the show's first dance solo in "A Night of Neglect". He was promoted from guest star to series regular for the third season. He was given a major storyline in the third episode of the season, "Asian F," and performed "Cool" from West Side Story, his first solo song. On June 28, 2013, it was reported that Shum would not return as a regular on Glee's fifth season but would be a recurring guest star.

Shum worked as both a choreographer and a dancer for the dance group The LXD.

Shum has been featured in many productions of Wong Fu Productions. In 2011, Shum starred in a short action film, 3 Minutes, directed by Ross Ching and produced by Don Le and George Wang. In 2012 he starred in White Frog, a comedy-drama film directed by Quentin Lee. Subsequently, Shum was cast in the role of the Kuai Liang (the younger Sub-Zero) in the second season of Mortal Kombat: Legacy. Harry had a major role in crime drama film Revenge of the Green Dragons, which was executive produced by Martin Scorsese. Shum was also a judge on the reality competition television series Face Off.

=== 2015–2018: Shadowhunters and other films ===
In 2016, Shum appeared as the character Wei-Fang in the Netflix American–Chinese martial arts film Crouching Tiger, Hidden Dragon: Sword of Destiny, a sequel to Crouching Tiger, Hidden Dragon (1999). Shum was also cast as the male lead, Peter Ma, in Single by 30, a YouTube Red original series from Wong Fu Productions and New Form Digital after starring in the original pilot in 2015. The first season of the series premiered on August 24, 2016, on Wong Fu Productions' Channel.

Shum scored a primary role in the Freeform series, Shadowhunters, and portrayed the centuries-old warlock Magnus Bane between 2016 and 2019. The show was based on Cassandra Clare's best-selling young adult fantasy series, The Mortal Instruments. His portrayal of Bane, a bisexual man of color, helped Shadowhunters win the 2017 GLAAD media award for an "Outstanding Drama Series", which he accepted with his co-star Matthew Daddario. Shum also received the Bisexual Representation Award (BiRA) for "Best Bisexual Representation of a Supporting Character" in both 2017 and 2018 hosted by FluidStyleCo. Shum won the award for The Male TV Star of 2018 in the E! People's Choice Awards for his role as Magnus Bane in Shadowhunters.

Alongside his work in Shadowhunters, he received supporting roles in films including Escape Plan: The Extractors and Burn. In 2018, Shum was cast as Charlie Wu in Jon M. Chu's Crazy Rich Asians. Despite most of his scenes from the lattermost being cut due to the desire to focus on one romantic pairing, he appears briefly in a mid-credits scene, hinting at a romantic link to one of the characters, Astrid Leong-Teo.

=== 2019–present ===
In 2019, Shum appeared in 4 episodes of Tell Me a Story which premiered in December 2019. In March 2020, Shum guest starred in an episode of Comedy Central's Awkwafina Is Nora from Queens. On December 4, the romantic drama All My Life was released in US theaters, followed by a premium video-on-demand release on December 23, and a streaming release on HBO Max on August 7, 2021.

Conspiracy thriller Broadcast Signal Intrusion, in which Shum starred and served as an executive producer, premiered to critical acclaim at South by Southwest Film Festival in March 2021 and was released On Demand and in select theaters on October 22, 2021.

In March 2022, Shum appeared in a supporting role in the critically acclaimed Academy Award-winning film Everything Everywhere All at Once. Michelle Yeoh called Shum "the most incredible physical comedian ever", referring to his performance in the film. On May 6, 2022, Deadline Hollywood reported that a Crazy Rich Asians spinoff is in early development at Warner Bros. and is set to focus on the relationship between Astrid Leong-Teo and Charlie Wu, played respectively by Gemma Chan and Shum. Starting October 2022, Shum joined the cast of Grey's Anatomy season 19 as surgical intern Dr. Benson "Blue" Kwan.

Shum also turned to voiceover work. He made a guest appearance in the Paramount+ animated series Star Trek: Lower Decks, voicing the character of Rawda. In 2022, Shum starred in and executive produced Realm's fiction podcast series Echo Park, which was nominated for Best Fiction Podcast at the iHeartRadio Podcast Awards. In 2023, Shum voiced Brainiac 5 in DC Studios's animated film set in the Tomorrowverse, Legion of Super-Heroes. Also, in 2023, he narrated the PBS Nature documentary The Hummingbird Effect.

In 2024, Shum portrayed a drag queen in the short Shimmer - Inspired by Eva Young, set to premiere at the Sun Valley Film Festival.

== Personal life ==
Shum began a relationship with actress and dancer Shelby Rabara in 2007. The two were engaged in October 2013 while on vacation in Hawaii and were married on November 22, 2015, in Costa Rica. They have a daughter, Xia, born 2019.

According to Shum, his father currently lives in Costa Rica, and he regularly visits the nation. He says his family has historically lived in Costa Rica, dating back at least 3 generations.

Shum has stated that he identifies as being somewhat Latino. He said, "It's strange that I am full Chinese and born in a Latin country, but I love the fact that I was immersed in that culture at birth while maintaining my Chinese roots."

== Filmography ==
=== Film ===
Year	Title	Role	Notes
2004	You Got Served	Dancer	
2007	Stomp the Yard	Crew dancer	
2008	The Onion Movie	"Lollipop Love" dancer	
2008	Step Up 2: The Streets	Cable	
2008	Center Stage: Turn It Up	Club dancer	
2010	Our Family Wedding	Harry	
2010	The LXD: The Uprising Begins	Elliot Hoo	
2010	Step Up 3D	Cable	
2011	3 Minutes	Harry - Hunter #1	Short film
2011	Glee: The 3D Concert Movie	Mike Chang	Concert film
2012	White Frog	Chaz Young	
2014	Moms' Night Out	Joey	
2014	Revenge of the Green Dragons	Paul Wong	
2015	Fire City: End of Days	Frank	
2016	Crouching Tiger, Hidden Dragon: Sword of Destiny	Wei-Fang	
2018	Crazy Rich Asians	Charlie Wu	
2019	Escape Plan: The Extractors	Bao Yung	
2019	Burn	Officer Liu	
2020	All My Life	Solomon "Sol" Chau	
2021	Broadcast Signal Intrusion	James	
2021	Love Hard	Owen Lin	
2022	Everything Everywhere All at Once	Chad	
2023	Legion of Super-Heroes	Brainiac 5	Voice
2024	Justice League: Crisis on Infinite Earths	Brainiac 5	Voice
2024	Kung Fu Panda 4	Scott the Fire-Breathing Croc	Voice
2024	Shimmer - Inspired by Eva Young	Dr. Ethan/Ai Mei Shimmer	Short film
2026	Voicemails for Isabelle	Andy	

=== Television ===
Year	Title	Role	Notes
2003	Boston Public	Fletcher	Episode: "Chapter Sixty"
2005	Committed	Chinese Delivery Guy	Episode: "The Apartment Episode"
2007	High School Musical 2 Dance-Along	Dancer	Television film; uncredited
2007	Viva Laughlin	Construction Dancer	Episode: "Pilot"
2008	Zoey 101	Roy	Episode: "Trading Places"
2008	Rita Rocks	Zack	Episode: "Flirting with Disaster"
2008	Greek	Omega Chi Brother	3 episodes
2008	iCarly	Yûki	Episode: "IGo to Japan"
2009–2015	Glee	Mike Chang	Recurring role (seasons 1–2, 5–6); main role (seasons 3–4)
2010–2011	The Legion of Extraordinary Dancers	Elliot Hoo	Miniseries
2013	Mortal Kombat: Legacy	Kuai Liang / Sub-Zero	Web series; guest role
2013	The Eric Andre Show	Himself	Episode: "Lance Reddick / Harry Shum Jr."
2014	Fake Off	Himself	Judge (season 2)
2014	Caper	Luke Washington	Web series; main role
2016	Single by 30	Peter Ma	Web series; main role
2016–2019	Shadowhunters	Magnus Bane	Main role
2019–2020	Tell Me a Story	Brendan	4 episodes
2020	Awkwafina Is Nora from Queens	Doc Hottie	Episode: "Grandma & Chill"
2022	Step Into... The Movies	Himself	TV special; "Beauty and the Beast" dance sequence
2022–present	Grey's Anatomy	Dr. Benson Kwan	Main role (season 19–present)
2022	Star Trek: Lower Decks	Rawda	Voice, episode: "A Mathematically Perfect Redemption"
2023	Station 19	Dr. Benson "Blue" Kwan	Episode: "We Build Then We Break"
2023	Blue Eye Samurai	Takayoshi (voice)	Recurring cast
2026	Dancing with the Stars	Contestant	Season 35, 6th place

=== Other ===
Year	Title	Role	Notes
2016	ReCore	Kai Brehn	Video game
2021	Christmas Delivery	Felix	Podcast series
2022	Echo Park	James/Terrance	Podcast series

== Awards and nominations ==
Year	Work	Award	Category	Result
2010	Glee	Screen Actors Guild Awards	Outstanding Performance by an Ensemble in a Comedy Series	Won
2010	Glee	Teen Choice Awards	Choice Music: Group (with cast)	Nominated
2010	Glee	Lesbian/Bi People's Choice Awards	Favorite Music Duo or Group (with cast)	Nominated
2010	Glee	Gay People's Choice Awards	Favorite Music Duo or Group (with cast)	Won
2011	Glee	Screen Actors Guild Awards	Outstanding Performance by an Ensemble in a Comedy Series	Nominated
2011	Glee	Teen Choice Awards	Choice Music: Group (with cast)	Nominated
2011	Himself	East West Players Visionary Awards	Breakout Performance Award	Won
2012	Glee	Screen Actors Guild Awards	Outstanding Performance by an Ensemble in a Comedy Series	Nominated
2013	Glee	Screen Actors Guild Awards	Outstanding Performance by an Ensemble in a Comedy Series	Nominated
2013	Himself	Hawaii International Film Festival	Rising Star of the Year	Won
2013	Remixed	Streamy Awards	Best Choreography	Nominated
2016	Shadowhunters	TV Scoop Awards	TV Breakout Star – Male	Won
2016	Shadowhunters	MTV Fandom Awards	Ship of the Year (shared with Matthew Daddario)	Nominated
2017	Shadowhunters	Teen Choice Awards	Choice TV: Summer Actor	Nominated
2017	Shadowhunters	Teen Choice Awards	Choice TV: Ship (shared with Matthew Daddario)	Nominated
2017	Shadowhunters	Teen Choice Awards	Choice TV: LipLock (shared with Matthew Daddario)	Nominated
2017	Shadowhunters	Bisexual Representation Award	Best Bisexual Representation by a Supporting Character Male	Won
2018	Shadowhunters	TV Scoop Awards	TV Best Drama Actor	Nominated
2018	Shadowhunters	TV Scoop Awards	TV Best Couple (shared with Matthew Daddario)	Nominated
2018	Shadowhunters	Teen Choice Awards	Choice TV: Ship (shared with Matthew Daddario)	Nominated
2018	Shadowhunters	Bisexual Representation Award	Best Bisexual Representation by a Supporting Character Male	Won
2018	Shadowhunters	People's Choice Award	The Male TV Star of 2018	Won
2019	Shadowhunters	Teen Choice Awards	Choice Sci-Fi Fantasy TV Actor	Nominated
2019	Shadowhunters	TV Scoop Awards	Best Performance	Nominated
2023	Echo Park	iHeart Podcast Awards	Best Fiction Podcast	Pending
2023	Everything Everywhere All at Once	Screen Actors Guild Awards	Outstanding Performance by a Cast in a Motion Picture	Won
