= Clara Chung =

American musician

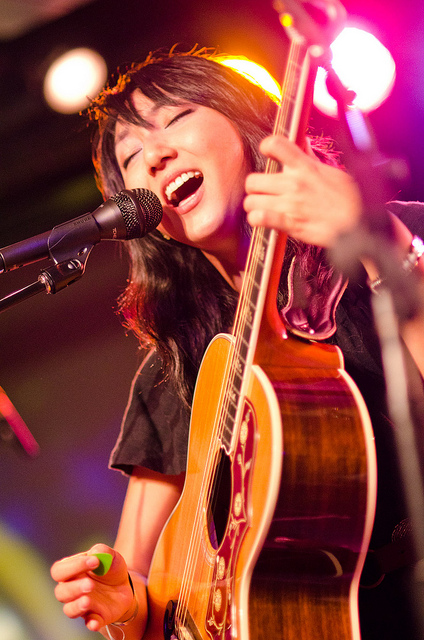
- Clara in 2011

Background information
- Also known as: CLARA (Previously Clara C)
- Born: Clara Chung; October 31, 1987 (age 38); New York, U.S.
- Origin: New York City, U.S.
- Occupations: Singer-songwriter; musician
- Instruments: Guitar; vocals; keyboards; drums; percussion; trumpet; flute; melodica
- Label: Independent

YouTube information
- Channel: CLARA
- Years active: 2009–present
- Genre: Music
- Subscribers: 236 thousand
- Views: 25.4 million
- Last updated: June 17, 2026

Clara Chung (born October 31, 1987), known mononymously as Clara (stylized in all caps), is an American singer-songwriter, producer and composer. She is a music artist who rose to fame on Youtube when she won numerous talent competitions in a row including JC Penney's Talent Search, Los Angeles’ Kollaboration 10, KAC Media Juice Night, and ISA 2009. CLARA is a self-taught multi-instrumentalist who writes, produces, and directs her own content. CLARA has independently sold-out tours worldwide and has performed at the Hollywood Bowl, Walt Disney Concert Hall, and for the White House's U.S. Department of Education. CLARA's music has been featured in commercials, Film & TV (Netflix's Big Mouth) and can be heard in public spaces all around the globe. CLARA also composes for cosmetics industry titan Bobbi Brown.

== Early life and education ==
Chung was born in New York on October 31, 1987, to South Korean-born parents who currently reside in Northridge, California.

Chung graduated from the University of California, Irvine with a Bachelor of Arts degree in psychology and a minor in Education in 2010 and is currently enrolled in a graduate program for Psychology at Pepperdine University. She is now a full-time professional music artist, but had taught children with autism prior to her music endeavors.

== Career ==
In a 2011 interview after the release of her first album, Chung said that she initially was not particularly motivated to post videos of her singing and guitar playing on YouTube, but was encouraged by her friends to try it out. Chung describes the music in her album, The Art in My Heart, as being diverse and "taking on a lot of different sounds." "There are songs that are very much like Sara Bareilles and others that are more like Coldplay. And there are other songs that I can't categorize. I guess if you want to sum up influences, I’d say definitely Sara Bareilles, John Mayer, Feist."

In 2010, Chung won the Kollaboration LA competition after writing her first hit original song "Offbeat" and performing it at the competition held at the Shrine located near University of Southern California.

In April 2010, Chung worked with other popular artists such as rappers Dumbfoundead and Jay Park.

In September 2010, she released her album Art in My Heart in conjunction with her music video for the lead single "Offbeat". The video for "Offbeat" was directed by viral video director Ross Ching (of Kina Grannis' "Valentine" music video fame) and produced by Don Le of Fusion3Films. The concept for the video was Chung singing amongst inspiring visuals in a world filled with bubbles. It has amassed over 13,000,000 unique YouTube views so far. DJ Descry and My Parasol have produced the only known remixes to date. In 2011, director Ross Ching and producer Don Le followed up with a second music video, "The Camel Song". The video featured YouTube personality, Nigahiga, as her love interest.

In February 2011, Chung announced her Loveprint mini-tour (March–April) in which she makes stops in Los Angeles, Boston, Seattle and San Diego.

On June 6, 2011, on an interview with Robert Herrera of Front Row Live Entertainment, Chung stated that she is currently writing a new album.

On September 25, 2012, Chung released her 2nd Album titled esc.

Chung also toured with David Choi on their Fall Tour presented by YesStyle, visiting 19 different cities from Canada and the United States.

On September 30, 2013, Chung released her acoustic album Organika, and in October toured the United States and Canada, visiting 14 cities. This tour was an acoustic tour that is based on her album Organika.

Chung and her husband were featured in Andy Grammer's music video for "Honey I'm Good."

=== Studio albums ===
Album Information	Track list
The Art in My Heart: Released: September 24, 2010	Track list: 1. Hum; 2. Offbeat; 3. Heartstrings; 4. The Camel Song; 5. Til We Go; 6. Fool's Gold; 7. Dear Daphne; 8. Loveprint; 9. Wait on Me; 10. Wake Up in Neverland
Album Information	Track list
Esc: Released: September 25, 2012	Track list: 1. You've Got It All; 2. Quesadilla; 3. Let Grow; 4. False Start; 5. Brighter Days; 6. Eventually; 7. By the Blue; 8. Wanting What I Need; 9. Fish; 10. These Are the Good Old Days
Album Information	Track list
Organika (An Acoustic Album): Released: September 30, 2013	Track list: 1. Nayelli; 2. Heartstrings (Remixed); 3. Wanting What I Need; 4. You've Got It All; 5. Quesadilla; 6. One Look; 7. Offbeat; 8. Fish
