= Stephen Liu =

American businessman

Stephen Christopher Liu is an American internet entrepreneur, media executive and philanthropist. He is the founder of Privy Circle, a community of influencers and entrepreneurs, and M8, a matchmaking app. He is also the founder of the Asian Professional Exchange as well as the National Asian Breast Cancer Initiative.

== Career ==
Liu is the CEO of Privy Groupe which owns Privy Circle, a luxury lifestyle brand, and M8, a dating app. Privy circle was previously Privy.net, an exclusive private social network and online/mobile platform for executives and influential figures in the US and Asia.

Previously, he Liu founded and was president of Reelplay, a Forbes Top 200 B2B Company. It was one of the early streaming video-enabled B2B digital marketplaces catering to the global film and television distribution industry. At Reelplay, Liu raised nearly $6 million in venture capital from Silicon Valley and Hollywood backers, including Softbank Capital and WaterView Advisors, run by Frank Biondi Jr. (a former Viacom, Universal Studios and HBO CEO).

Liu founded the Asian Professional Exchange in 1993 in the wake of the 1992 Los Angeles riots. Though there were many organizations that catered to particular Asian ethnicities and their professions, Liu was interested in establishing a pan-Asian organization for young professionals that mentored its members and gave back to the community. Despite initial naysaying, the organization grew. "Above all, I wanted to make sure that the group was inclusive, so that a new person coming into town would feel welcomed," he told Asian Week.

He served as the organization's founding president from 1993 to 1997, and led the organization from conception to one of the largest Asian Pacific American organizations in United States, with over 10,000 members. Liu remains active in the organization and serves as chairman of the board.

In 2010, with Teddy Zee Productions, Liu produced a series of public service announcement videos alongside Teddy Zee (Hitch / Pursuit of Happyness), Adrian Zaw, and George Wang. John Cho, Sandra Oh, Kaba Modern Legacy, Justin Chon, David Choi, and many other celebrities were featured in the announcements, which helped to secure funding for the Center for the Pacific Asian Family (CPAF) through the Chase Community Giving contest. The charity was in the top 20 out of 100 competing charities, creating awareness for issues regarding sexual assault and domestic violence.

His involvement in the entertainment industry also includes a credit as executive producer of the feature documentary film, Yours Truly, Miss Chinatown.

In addition, Liu co-founded The National Asian Breast Cancer Initiative (NABCI). It is a pilot, not-for-profit initiative headed by the Privy Groupe, that aims to address the unique cultural, linguistic and biological challenges that Asian women face related to breast cancer; Liu's mother is a breast cancer survivor. The NABCI is fiscally managed by the Asian Pacific Community Fund, and endorsed by the Asian and Pacific Islander National Cancer Survivors Network, which is part of the Asian & Pacific Islander American Health Forum. The initiative was formed to address the cultural, linguistic and genetic challenges that Asian women face related to breast cancer.

== Honors and public recognition ==
His varied accomplishments earned Liu the honor of "Icon of Inspiration" by Martell/APEX in 2014, as well as "Local Hero" by KCET and UnionBank in 2009 and an "Emerging Leader" by the Asian Pacific Community Fund (APCF) in 2008. He was also recognized by the Boy Scouts of America as a "Distinguished Citizen" and Goldsea as one of the "Top 40 Young Asian American Professionals".

In addition, Liu is an active commentator on luxury marketing to Asian Americans and the media. He has been invited to speak at events such as, the Asian American Advertising Federation (3AF) and the Internet Dating & Dating Industry Conference. He's also been recognized by the Asian Pacific American Studies School at Loyola Marymount University.
