= Ben Ketai =

American film director

Benjamin Ketai
- Born: West Bloomfield, Michigan, United States
- Education: University of Michigan
- Occupations: Film director, screenwriter, producer
- Notable work: 30 Days of Night: Dark Days; StartUp; River Wild
- Website: benketai.com

Benjamin Ketai is an American filmmaker. He directed and wrote the following Ghost House Pictures productions: 30 Days of Night: Dark Days and the webseries 30 Days of Night: Dust to Dust.

== Career ==
In 2010, the SyFy Channel released The Resistance, executive produced by Ketai, Scott Bayless, and Scott Rogers and directed by Adrian Picardi. It started as a low budget web series in the form of 4 short online teasers on YouTube. Before filming the actual web show, the series was picked up by Sam Raimi’s Ghost House Pictures and Starz Media, after executives at Ghost House viewed The Resistance teasers online. The web show aired on October 4, 2010, on the SyFy channel as a one-hour television pilot. It was also released in its original 8 episodic form on iTunes, Xbox Live, and the PlayStation Network. "The Resistance" was produced by Aaron Lam, Eric Ro, and Associate Producer Don Le. The pilot made history, as it's the first time a series created originally for the web was premiered on television.

In 2012, Ketai created, wrote and directed an original series for Crackle, Chosen, starring Milo Ventimiglia.

Ketai wrote the script of the real-life project Johnny Frank Garrett's Last Word, based on the life of Johnny Garrett. In the same year, he wrote the script to the sequel to The Strangers, with Bryan Bertino, entitled The Strangers: Prey at Night and released in 2018.

In 2016, the TV series he created, StartUp, starring Adam Brody, Edi Gathegi, and Martin Freeman, premiered on Crackle. He also directed and wrote select episodes. Season 2 premiered in September 2017.

== Filmography ==
Year	Film	Credit	Notes
2006	Tales from the Grudge	Written by, co-producer	Short film
2007	Suck	Director, written by	Short film
2008	Megan	Director, written by, producer	Short film
2010	30 Days of Night: Dark Days	Director, screenplay by	Co-wrote with Steve Niles
2013	The Elm Tree	The producer would like to thank	
2013	Beneath	Director	
2016	The Forest	Written by	Co-wrote with Sarah Cornwell and Nick Antosca
2016	Johnny Frank Garrett's Last Word	Screenplay by, story by	Co-wrote screenplay with Marc Haimes, co-wrote story with Tony Giglio
2018	The Strangers: Prey at Night	Written by, associate producer	Co-wrote with Bryan Bertino
2018	Malevolent	Screenplay by	Co-wrote with Eva Konstantopoulos
2023	River Wild	Director & writer	Co-wrote with Mike Nguyen Le
