= Ross Ching =

American filmmaker

- Born: 1985 or 1986 (age 40–41)
- Occupations: Film director, editor
- Website: http://www.rossching.com

Ross Ching is an American filmmaker based in Los Angeles, California.

== Early life and education ==
Ching grew up in San Jose, California. He started making skateboarding videos as a teenager. Ching went on to study film at San Diego State University and graduated in 2008. He was originally interested in producing but later transitioned to production after his time lapse and stop motion videos in college began winning awards.

== Career ==
Ching's edited together thousands of long-exposure photographs in QuickTime Pro for first short film Eclectic . He's released at least two more sequels by March 2009.

Following his graduation, he created a video inspired by Death Cab for Cutie's song, "Little Bribes" due to the lack of employment opportunities during the Great Recession. He used time-lapse photography to visually represent the song's 211 words alongside images from Los Angeles. The project took 50 hours to make and cost about $100. Prior to releasing it, he contacted different people on Twitter with large followings to preview the video, who in turn promoted it. He posted the video on his website in May 2009 under the banner, "looking for work". Stereogum later covered the video, saying "We rarely post fan-made videos, but this is too good... Hire him!" Within days, Atlantic Records contacted Ching to purchase the video and released it as the song's official music video.

Ching released action short film 3 Minutes in 2011.

He also re-released "Running on Empty" and added new footage to it, redubbing it for the big "Carmageddon" event in Los Angeles that threatened to shut down the freeway system.

Producers Don Le and Peter Katz approached Ching to shoot the short film, "Already Gone". The film was shot in one day in a Los Angeles warehouse and starred Shawn Ashmore and Harry Shum, Jr. The producers hoped that the short film would generate enough interest for a feature film treatment. The short was one of the top finalists at the first ever Shot on RED Film Festival in 2012.

Ching directed a webseries for Thrash Lab called "Empty America". He followed it up with "10 Epic Ways to Smash A Pumpkin".

== Filmography ==
- 3 Minutes (2011)
- "Running on Empty" (2011)
- "Empty America" webseries (2012)
- "Already Gone" short film (2012)

=== Music video ===
Year	Film	Artist	Notes
2009	"Little Bribes"	Death Cab for Cutie	
2009	"My Girlfriend"	Uncle Kracker	
2009	"Welcome All Again"	Collective Soul	
2009	"Electricidad"	Jesse & Joy	
2010	"Valentine"	Kina Grannis	
2010	"Offbeat"	Clara Chung	
2011	"The Camel Song"	Clara Chung	
2011	"Without You"	AJ Rafael	
2012	"Missing Piece"	David Choi	
2012	"Without Me"	Kina Grannis	
2012	"Fish"	Clara Chung	
