= Andy Dugan =

American actor and filmmaker

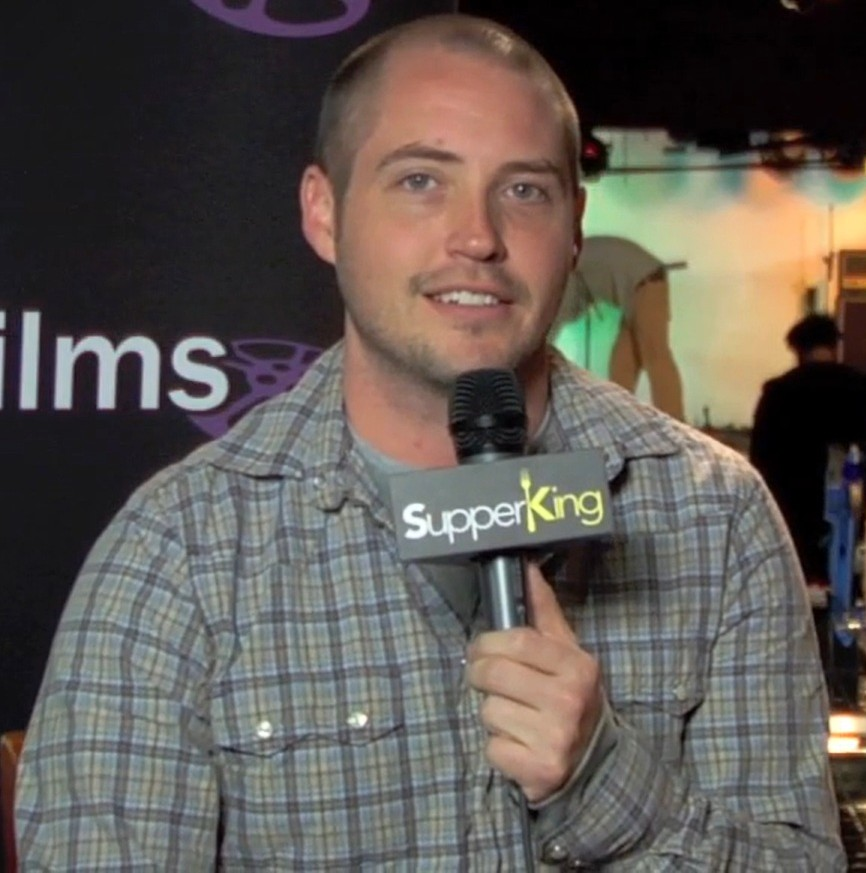
Dugan in 2013

Andy Dugan (born December 16, 1981) is an American actor and filmmaker. He has worked on a variety of branded content as well, writing, directing and producing short films, commercials, music videos, web serials and marketing campaigns.

== Biography ==
=== Early life and education ===
Andy Dugan was born in Oklahoma City, Oklahoma on December 16, 1981. He moved to New York City in 2001 and studied at the New York Film Academy, then moved to Los Angeles in 2003 to start his filmmaking career.

=== Career ===
Dugan has overseen numerous successful social media marketing campaigns and has cultivated relationships with such brands as Rogue Pictures, Fox, Sony Pictures, FedEx, Heineken, Universal Studios, Fanista and more. He produced and directed online spots featuring such talent as Jackson Browne, Sylvester Stallone and Maná for the "BURMA, It Can't Wait" campaign, as well as produced the groundbreaking HIV prevention campaign entitled "In The Moment".

As a screenwriter, he has written feature films, TV shows, web serials, commercials and shorts. He has directed a feature film, numerous commercials and music videos, and TV shows.

Andy lives in Los Angeles and is represented by United Talent Agency.

== Filmography ==
- Producer: Leonard Knight: A Man & His Mountain 2015

== Awards and honors ==
- 2007: Emmy Award, Outstanding Broadband Drama, Satacracy 88
- 2007: Webby Award, Best Dramatic Online Film and Video
