= Kina Grannis =

American guitarist

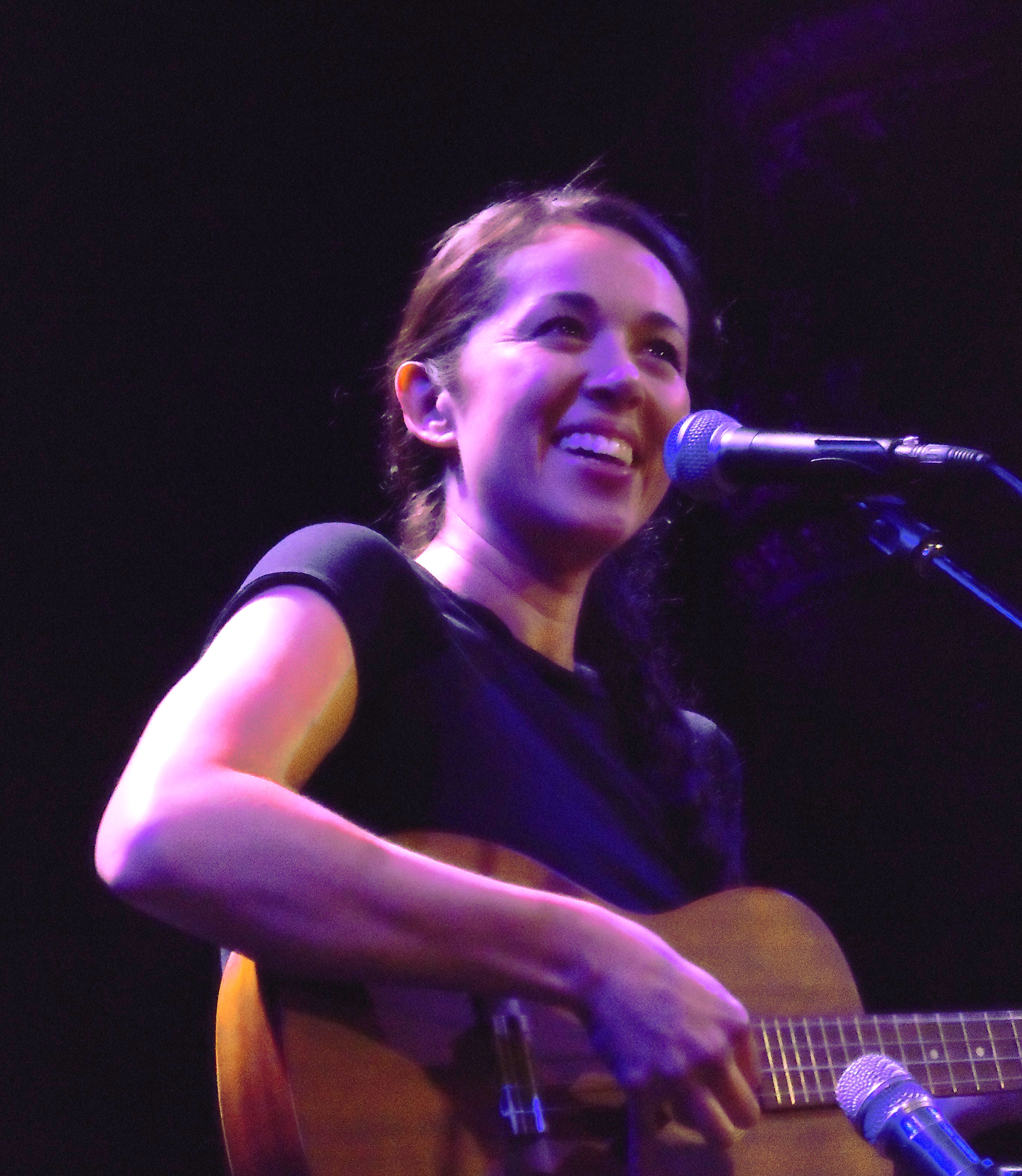
- Grannis performing in 2023

Background information
- Born: Kina Kasuya Grannis; August 4, 1985 (age 41); Mission Viejo, California, U.S.
- Genres: Acoustic; pop
- Occupations: Guitarist; singer; songwriter; YouTuber
- Instruments: Vocals; guitar; ukulele; piano
- Years active: 2001–present
- Labels: KG Records (2017–present); One Haven (2010–2017); Independent (2009–2010); Interscope Records (2008)
- Website: www.kinagrannis.com

Kina Kasuya Grannis (born August 4, 1985) is an American guitarist, singer and YouTuber. Grannis was the winner of the 2008 Doritos Crash the Super Bowl contest, earning a recording contract with Interscope Records and having her music video played during the commercials of Super Bowl XLII on February 3, 2008.

In 2010, Grannis released her album Stairwells and the music video for "In Your Arms", leading to appearances on The Ellen DeGeneres Show and Jimmy Kimmel Live!. Grannis joined the crowdsource funding platform Patreon in 2014 shortly before releasing her album Elements. While touring in support of Elements, Grannis was held in Indonesia for one hundred days. Longtime collaboration with Wong Fu Productions culminated in a starring role in the YouTube Red Original romantic comedy series Single by 30. In 2018 Grannis released In the Waiting, the first album off her listener-supported label, shortly before making a cameo appearance in the Critics' Choice Award-winning film Crazy Rich Asians and embarking on an international concert tour.

== Early life and career beginnings ==
Grannis grew up in Mission Viejo, California. She has European heritage on her father's side and Japanese on her mother's, sometimes referred to as hapa, and was mistaken for Latina growing up. She attended Viejo Elementary School, Newhart Middle School and, from 1999 to 2003, Capistrano Valley High School. Her first trip outside of the United States was to Japan at age 12, with her grandmother. Grannis enrolled at the University of Southern California (USC) in Los Angeles in 2003. Two years later, staff members of the University's Thornton School of Music asked her to produce an album in their music and music industry departments. That album, Sincerely, Me., was released the same year. In 2007, she graduated summa cum laude in social science with an emphasis on psychology. While attending USC, she was inducted into academic society Phi Beta Kappa.

== Career ==
In 2006, Grannis recorded and self-released two more albums, One More in the Attic and In Memory of the Singing Bridge. In early 2007, she recorded "Ours to Keep" written by Rachael Lawrence and Deborah Ellen. This song would be featured regularly on General Hospital and was in an episode of the ABC Family's mini-series Samurai Girl in September 2008.

On November 14, 2007, she created her YouTube account and began posting videos of her songs online. Her first video, "Message from Your Heart", was entered into Doritos Crash the Super Bowl contest. Her progress in the competition was covered in the Orange County Register and The Wall Street Journal. and featured on FOX News Los Angeles, Good Day L.A. and Yahoo!. The contest, which she won, landed her a contract with Interscope Records. Her YouTube videos have received more than 99 million views and have propelled her to become one of YouTube's most popular personalities. Grannis planned to work with Interscope Records to produce a new album, but in January 2009, she announced that she was leaving the label to be an independent artist.

On February 24, 2008, Grannis sang the national anthem for the Auto Club 500 NASCAR race in Fontana, California. In June 2009 her songs "Never Never" and "People" were used in episodes of MTV's reality series College Life. On January 13, 2010, Grannis was the headliner at a sold-out show at The Troubadour club in Los Angeles.

=== Stairwells (2010) ===
Stairwells was released on February 23, 2010, and included many original songs already appearing on YouTube, as well as three previously unreleased songs: "World in Front of Me", "In Your Arms", and "Mr. Sun". Stairwells debuted at No. 139 on the Billboard 200, No. 5 on the Billboard Top Internet Albums chart, No. 2 on the Billboard Heatseekers chart, and No. 18 on the Billboard Independent Albums chart. The location of her release party for Stairwells, the Dakota Lounge in Santa Monica, was the subject of an article in the Orange Country Register because the venue enabled her to show her gratitude to her fans. On March 13, 2010, her single "Valentine" was played by Paul Gambaccini on BBC Radio 2, a popular radio station in the UK. The music video for "Valentine" directed by a young and talented viral video director Ross Ching has been viewed well over 21 million times on YouTube.

Grannis' Stairwells Springtime Tour began in San Francisco on May 24, 2010, and concluded in late June after several stints on the East Coast and in Canada. Her Fall Tour began on September 17, 2010, and concluded on November 17, 2010. On July 10, 2010, she played at Lilith Fair in St. Louis, Missouri. In 2010, Grannis was featured as Judy in a miniseries by Wong Fu Productions entitled "Funemployed". In early 2011, Grannis was awarded the title of Sirius/XM CoffeeHouse's 2010 Singer-Songwriter Discovery of the Year after a months-long online voting period. Her song "Heart and Mind" was used for the German TV series Anna und die Liebe. On November 3, 2011, Grannis released a stop-motion music video for the single In Your Arms, using 288,000 Jelly Belly jelly beans. It took about 2 years to complete the project. The video accumulated over 1 million views within the first three days. As of 2024 it has over 14 million views.

=== World in Front of Me Tour (2011) ===
In April 2011, Grannis launched her first world tour. She performed in the eastern regions of Canada and in the eastern and southern regions of the United States. She continued in May through the northwest region of North America which included stops in Vancouver, British Columbia, and Los Angeles. Shows in Europe and southeast Asia followed into the fall of 2011.

=== In Your Arms Tour (2011) ===
In late 2011 and into 2012, Grannis launched her In Your Arms Tour in Europe, Asia (Indonesia, Singapore, Philippines, Malaysia, Hong Kong), Australia, and North America.

In March 2013, Grannis gave a talk at TEDx Hollywood titled 'Finding Community Through the Internet'.

=== Elements (2014) ===
Elements was released on May 6, 2014, and was produced by Matt Hales (a.k.a. Aqualung). Starting in November 2013, Grannis began ramping up for the forthcoming album with the launch of "Kina Mondays", which promised a weekly video via Kina's YouTube channel. Nearly six months later, she continued to deliver on that promise and released a video for "The Fire", the first single from Elements. The song showcases acoustics and folk-driven vocals. The following week another album track was released via video with a stripped-down version of "My Own" featuring her sisters. "Dear River", an upbeat track, premiered on Glamour's "Obsessed Blog". Elements debuted at No. 48 on the Billboard 200, No. 4 on the Billboard Americana/Folk chart, and No. 7 on the Billboard Independent Albums chart. On its release day, Elements hit No. 2 on iTunes Singer Songwriter Chart, and No. 1 on iTunes Canada.

Grannis announced that she would be celebrating the release of her sophomore studio album Elements with fans at a handful of intimate shows across North America, kicking off with a show at the Troubadour in Hollywood on May 6 – Elements' release date. From there, she performed in San Francisco, New York City, Brooklyn, DC, Boston, Toronto, and Chicago. The select dates were the first time fans could hear Elements live and also served as her first official headline run since the spring of 2012.

In late 2014 and 2015, Grannis launched her Elements tour in Europe and North America. She embarked on a tour of Southeast Asia, but was only able to play two shows before she and her band were detained by Indonesian authorities for having the wrong type of visas. Grannis and her crew were deported from the country after three months.

=== Patreon ===
Grannis joined Patreon, a site created by Jack Conte to provide artists a living via direct support, in April 2014.

In April 2017, Grannis created a record label entirely composed of her patrons and began creating an album entirely funded by her supporters. On advice of these supporters, the record label was named KG Records. Grannis began recording, producing, and releasing songs from the upcoming album throughout 2017.

=== In the Waiting (2018) ===
Her first major release under KG Records was the album In The Waiting, on June 29, 2018.

=== Twitch ===
Grannis began streaming on Twitch in 2020. During this time she reached Twitch Partner status.

=== It's Hard To Be Human (2021) ===
Her second major release under KG Records was the album It's Hard To Be Human, on October 12, 2021. Building on the themes of her previous album, It's Hard To Be Human further chronicled and grappled with Grannis' journey through infertility and IVF. Shortly after the album's official release, Grannis announced the birth of her child, Aya.

=== Later career ===
Beginning in 2023, Grannis joined with her husband Imaginary Future, as well as her friend Mree and her husband Henri Bardot, in a musical group called "people i like". Later in 2023, she and Imaginary Future released a compilation album of duets titled I Found You, and their respective music catalogs were acquired by Endurance Music Group.

== Collaborations ==
Grannis has been a part of several Wong Fu Productions short films including The Last, as well as the series Funemployed and Single by 30. She has also appeared in other YouTube stars' videos. One of the bands Grannis has performed with in YouTube videos is Boyce Avenue. They have recorded many cover songs together such as "Fast Car", originally by Tracy Chapman, and the song "With or Without You" by U2. She also collaborated with Ryan Higa, David Choi, and Jesse Epstein to create a comedic song and music video, titled "Millennial Love".

== Personal life ==
Grannis has two sisters, Misa and Emi, both of whom have occasionally been featured in her video blogs, as well as accompanying her at concerts and on tour. Her father, Gordon, is a chiropractor, and her mother, Trish, is a graphic designer.

On August 31, 2013, Grannis married frequent musical collaborator Jesse Epstein in a small ceremony in Los Angeles, California, after they had dated for 11 years. They met while attending Capistrano Valley High School in 2002; Jesse was in the grade below Kina. Grannis used footage from her wedding to create the music video she released for her song "My Dear". In June 2021, after years of struggling with infertility, Grannis announced that she and her husband were expecting a daughter.

On September 14, 2015, Grannis and her band left Los Angeles heading to Jakarta, Indonesia. It would have been the first concert in a tour of Southeast Asia. Due to complications with her work visa, she was detained for 100 days in the country. During this time she was told to not talk about her struggles or create any YouTube videos. While waiting each day for an update she was able to write two songs, California and For Now.

=== Philanthropy ===
An avid supporter of cancer research, Grannis has performed at several Southern California Relay For Life functions over the years.

In late 2007, she contributed her music to the Band Together: To Fight Measles benefit album.

In October 2008, she participated in the Nike Women's Marathon in San Francisco to support the Leukemia Lymphoma Society in honor of her mother, raising $6,000 for the organization.

In 2009, the philanthropic organization Sister to Sisters adopted her song Message from Your Heart.

In 2011, Grannis contributed her song Message from Your Heart to a benefit album released as part of a broader relief effort for the 2011 Tōhoku earthquake and tsunami.

In 2012, she launched a charity project called Run Team Kina dedicated to the promotion of personal health and wellness and to raise money for the Leukemia Lymphoma Society. In 2012, Run Team Kina raised $71,886 for The Leukemia & Lymphoma Society.

In 2023, after her mother's cancer returned, Grannis spearheaded a months-long initiative to register blood donors, including serving as grand marshal of the Northern California Cherry Blossom Festival's Grand Parade.

== Discography ==
- Sincerely, Me. (2006)
- One More in the Attic (2006)
- In Memory of the Singing Bridge (2006)
- Stairwells (2010)
- Elements (2014)
- In the Waiting (2018)
- It's Hard To Be Human (2021)

== Songs in other media ==
Year	Title	Type	Song
2007	General Hospital	TV series episode	"Ours to Keep"
2008	Glass City	Feature film	"Down and Gone (The Blue Song)"
2008	Glass City	Feature film	"Strong Enough"
2008	Glass City	Feature film	"Try"
2008	J.C. Penney	Web Ad: "Back-to-School Interactive Initiative"	"My Time With You"(with David Choi)
2008	Samurai Girl	TV mini-series	"Ours to Keep"
2008	Super Bowl XLII	TV sports program	"Message from Your Heart"
2009	College Life	TV series episode: "Spring Break"	"People"
2009	College Life	TV series episode: "Year's End"	"Never Never"
2009	General Hospital	TV series episode	"Walking Away"
2009	Sister to Sister	Nonprofit: Theme song	"Message from Your Heart"
2010	Agents of Secret Stuff	Web film	"My Time with You"
2011	Pretty Little Liars	TV episode	"In Your Arms"
2011	The Protector	TV episode	"Back To Us"
2011	The Real World	TV episode	"In Your Arms"
2011	The Real World	TV episode	"Delicate"
2011	My Life as Liz	TV episode (S2E03)	"Stars Falling Down"
2011	My Life as Liz	TV episode (S2E05)	"The Goldfish Song"
2011	Teen Mom 2	TV episode (S1E01)	"World in Front of Me"
2011	Teen Mom 2	TV episode (S1E02)	"Back To US"
2012	Gossip Girl	TV series episode	"Valentine"
2012	Gossip Girl	TV series episode	"The One You Say Goodnight To"
2012	Switched at Birth	TV series episode (S01E21)	"Heart and Mind"
2012	Home and Away	TV series episode (Episode 5533)	"World in Front of Me"
2012	Home and Away	TV series episode (Episode 5534)	"In Your Arms"
2012	Home and Away	TV series episode (Episode 5534)	"It's Love"
2012	Wallander	TV series trailer	"Sound of Silence (Cover)"
2012	The Real L Word	TV series (Episode S3E09)	"In Your Arms"
2012	Home and Away	TV series episode (Episode 5568)	"Without Me"
2012	Home and Away	TV series episode (Episode 5573)	"World in Front of Me"
2012	Home and Away	TV series episode (Episode 5578)	"Delicate"
2012	Home and Away	TV series episode (Episode 5585)	"Message from Your Heart"
2012	Home and Away	TV series episode (Episode 5587)	"In Your Arms"
2012	Home and Away	TV series episode (Episode 5593)	"Message from Your Heart"
2012	Home and Away	TV series episode (Episode 5611)	"It's Love"
2012	Home and Away	TV series episode (Episode 5613)	"World in Front of Me"
2012	Home and Away	TV series episode (Episode 5628)	"It's Love"
2012	Home and Away	TV series episode (Episode 5631)	"It's Love"
2012	Home and Away	TV series episode (Episode 5636)	"Without Me"
2012	Home and Away	TV series episode (Episode 5650)	"Stars falling Down"
2012	Home and Away	TV series episode (Episode 5657)	"It's Love"
2013	Home and Away	TV series episode (Episode 5764)	"It's Love"
2013	Winners & Losers	TV series episode	"World in Front of Me"
2014	Switched at Birth	TV series episode (Season 3 Episode 14)	"My Own"
2018	iZombie	TV series episode (Season 4 Episode 11)	"Souvenirs"
2018	Crazy Rich Asians	Feature film	"Can't Help Falling in Love"
2019	Big Mouth	TV series episode (Season 3 Episode 11)	"Bad Blood" (featuring CLARA)

== Television appearances ==
- Good Day, LA (KTTV, Los Angeles) – February 5, 2008
- NASCAR California 500 (Fox, National) – February 24, 2008
- The Early Show (CBS, National) – June 19, 2010
- San Diego Living (XETV, San Diego) – September 14, 2010
- The Morning Show (WJXT, Jacksonville) – October 6, 2010
- Good Day (WOFL, Orlando) – October 8, 2010
- Featured in "Nice Guys" Music Video with Chester See, NigaHiga, and KevJumba – May 31, 2011
- Taratata (France 2, Paris – France) – November 9, 2011
- Ellen (Syndicated, National) – November 15, 2011
- E! News (E!, National)- November 22, 2011
- Jimmy Kimmel Live! (ABC, National)- January 12, 2012
- Channel News Asia AM LIVE! ( Singapore ) – March 20, 2012
- The Real L Word (uncredited) (Showtime) – September 6, 2012

== Web series appearances ==
- Single by 30 as Joanna Taylor (YouTube Red Original Series) – (August 24, 2016 – October 4, 2016)

== Film appearances ==
- Crazy Rich Asians as herself – August 15, 2018

== Awards and nominations ==
Year	Award	Nominated work	Result
2008	Crash the Super Bowl	"Message from Your Heart"	Won
2010	Sirius/XM CoffeeHouse's 2010 Singer-Songwriter Discovery of the Year	Self	Won
2011	MTV O Music Awards Best Web-Born Artist	Self	Won
2012	Channel One News Artist of the Year	Self	Won
2012	MVPA Awards Best Animated Video	"In Your Arms" music video	Won
2012	MVPA Awards Best Special Effects	"In Your Arms" music video	Won
