= Don Le =

American filmmaker of Vietnamese descent (born 1983)

Don Pham Le
- Born: Don Pham Le; September 20, 1983 (age 43); Houston, Texas
- Occupation: Producer

Don Pham Le (born September 20, 1983) is an American television and music video producer.

== Career ==
In 2008, he co-founded the production company Northern Five Entertainment and produced the original pilot episodes for the action web series The Resistance with director Adrian Picardi and producer Eric Ro. Under Northern Five, Le worked as associate producer for the music video "Makeup Smeared Eyes" for the band Automatic Love Letter.

In 2009, he produced a music video for a song called "A Soldier Never Dies", a track dedicated to fallen marine Anthony Hector Vargas. Currently, Le is focused on a new production company specializing in videography and photography for film, TV, commercials and music videos. He also recently started a wedding production company called Bliss Imagery that focuses on traditional and photojournalistic videography and photography for engaged/soon-to-be wedded couples.

Le's video work on Neuromarketing was featured on CNN's The Screening Room (the intro was co-directed by Le and nationally televised), Wired and Mental Floss.

In 2010, under the Teddy Zee Productions banner, Le directed and produced a series of charity PSA videos alongside Teddy Zee, Adrian Zaw, George Wang and APEX founder Stephen Liu. The charity ended up in the top 20 out of 100 charities competing for the top prize and ended up creating awareness for sexual assault and domestic violence. In September 2010, he produced videos for the first-ever AAPI Rock the Vote 2010 campaign with Teddy Zee, George Wang and Adrian Zaw.

The project released January 10, 2011. 3 Minutes received nationwide coverage from the official Star Wars site, Entertainment Weekly, Wired, Gizmodo and Seventeen.

In mid-2011, Le produced a series of three short comedic sketches with Wong Fu Productions In 2011, Le worked on music videos with director Ross Ching, including producing duties with musicians Kina Grannis, Jason Chen and "Missing Piece" with artist David Choi. He also produced a short film with George Wang for the LXD which featured prominently on Fox's Glee 2011 concert tour. The short was showcased in front of the concert itself before every show and was sponsored by Chevy.

In April 2012, Le and producer Peter Katz released a short film based on the script of Bill Balas' feature length film Already Gone.

Le produced a conspiracy thriller-comedic short directed by Ching, starring YouTubers KevJumba and David So.

Le serves as creator and executive producer of The Bachelor Vietnam which premiered in late summer 2018 on HTV7 in Vietnam. In 2019, he produced the documentary Touching The Moon: the Ngô Thanh Vân Story for Ngo Thanh Van, and was subsequently released online.

== Filmography ==
=== Producer ===
==== Music video ====
Year	Title	Artist	Notes	Reference(s)
2008	"Makeup Smeared Eyes"	Automatic Love Letter	Associate producer	
2010	"Offbeat"	Clara Chung		
2011	"Without You"	AJ Rafael	with director Ross Ching	
2011	"The Camel Song"	Clara Chung	with director Ross Ching	
2013	"So Alive"	Tiffany Alvord		
2014	"GTFO"	Ryan Higa		

==== Film ====
Year	Title	Role	Notes	Reference(s)
2011	3 Minutes	Producer	Short film	
2012	Already Gone	Producer	Short film	
2014	ABCs of Death 2	Producer	Segment "A"	

==== Episodic series ====
Year	Title	Role	Notes	Reference(s)
2010	The Resistance	Associate producer		
