= Chosen (American TV series) =

American television series

- Genre: Action; Thriller; Drama
- Created by: Ben Ketai; Ryan Lewis
- Starring: Chad Michael Murray; Milo Ventimiglia; Nicky Whelan; Sarah Roemer; Caitlin Carmichael; Brandon Routh; Diedrich Bader; Rose McGowan; Brett Davern
- Country of origin: United States
- Original language: English
- No. of seasons: 3
- No. of episodes: 18 (list of episodes)

Production
- Producers: Ben Ketai; Milo Ventimiglia; Ryan Lewis; Evan Charnov; Russ Cundiff
- Running time: 40-44 minutes
- Production companies: Dissident Pictures; DiVide Pictures; Lifeboat Productions

Original release
- Network: Crackle
- Release: January 17, 2013 – April 15, 2014

Chosen (stylized onscreen as CH:OS:EN accompanied by a ticking sound) is an American action-thriller television series from Ben Ketai and Ryan Lewis, airing via online streaming video service Crackle. Each season consisted of six episodes released simultaneously: season one was released on January 17, 2013; season two was released on December 13 that same year; the third and final season was released on April 15, 2014. Two weeks later, Crackle announced it had renewed the series for a fourth season, but no other information was released until series star Milo Ventimiglia tweeted, on June 20, 2016, that the fourth season would not be moving forward.

A Chinese remake of the series premiered worldwide on Netflix in March 2018.

== Plot ==
Ian Mitchell is a lawyer, divorced from Laura and father of their young daughter Ellie. Ian receives a box containing a gun and a picture of a stranger, along with instructions to kill the pictured person. He is subsequently attacked by another stranger, and discovers that he has been chosen by a mysterious organization known as The Watchers to participate in a lethal game. Along with his daughter and ex-wife, Ian must deal with Jacob, another player forced into the game.

== Cast ==
- Chad Michael Murray as Jacob Orr
- Milo Ventimiglia as Ian Mitchell
- Nicky Whelan as Laura Mitchell
- Sarah Roemer as Avery Sharp
- Brandon Routh as Max Gregory
- Caitlin Carmichael as Ellie Mitchell
- Diedrich Bader as Daniel Easton
- Rose McGowan as Josie Acosta
- Brett Davern as Paul

== Episodes ==
Season	Episodes	Originally aired	
Season	Episodes	First aired	Last aired
1	6	January 17, 2013	January 17, 2013
2	6	December 12, 2013	December 26, 2013
3	6	April 15, 2014	April 15, 2014

Promotional Poster

== Broadcast ==
All six episodes of season one of Chosen premiered in Australia on FX on June 16, 2013. All 18 episodes of the first three seasons of Chosen were aired in Germany on 13th Street on February 2, 2015, through March 9, 2015.

== Chinese adaptation ==
A three-part Chinese adaptation was released on iQIYI in China and Taiwan in January 2018, and worldwide via Netflix in March 2018. The remake, a Chinese-Australian co-production set in Australia, follows the core plot of the series but makes changes to the characters; for example, the main character is a surgeon instead of a lawyer, portrayed by Lan Cheng-lung. The series also stars Sam Hayden-Smith, Deng Jiajia and Jenny Zhou.
