= Hitch (film) =

2005 film by Andy Tennant

- Theatrical release poster
- Directed by: Andy Tennant
- Written by: Kevin Bisch
- Produced by: Will Smith; James Lassiter; Teddy Zee
- Starring: Will Smith; Eva Mendes; Kevin James; Amber Valletta; Michael Rapaport; Adam Arkin
- Cinematography: Andrew Dunn
- Edited by: Troy Takaki; Tracey Wadmore-Smith
- Music by: George Fenton
- Production companies: Columbia Pictures; Overbrook Entertainment
- Distributed by: Sony Pictures Releasing
- Release date: February 11, 2005 (United States)
- Running time: 118 minutes
- Country: United States
- Language: English
- Budget: $55–70 million
- Box office: $371.5 million

Hitch is a 2005 American romantic comedy film directed by Andy Tennant and starring Will Smith in the title role, along with Eva Mendes, Kevin James, and Amber Valletta. Written by Kevin Bisch, it features Smith as a professional matchmaker who makes a living teaching men how to woo women. Unfortunately, while helping his latest client woo the woman of his dreams, he himself finds out that his game does not work on the gossip columnist with whom he is smitten.

Columbia Pictures released Hitch on February 11, 2005. The film received positive reviews from critics and was a box office hit, grossing $371.5 million worldwide, becoming the tenth highest-grossing film of 2005.

== Plot ==
In New York, Alex "Hitch" Hitchens is a professional "date doctor" who coaches other men in the art of wooing women, with the main focus of achieving genuine long-term relationships. Hitch typically coaches a client on how to catch his interest's eye with 'shock and awe', show he listens without being overbearing and finally going for a kiss on the third date, but carefully, allowing her to initiate it.

While coaching one of his clients, Albert Brennaman - who is smitten with a client of his investment firm, celebrity Allegra Cole - Hitch finds himself falling for Sara Melas, a gossip columnist and cynical workaholic. While Albert and Allegra's relationship progresses, Hitch has difficulty connecting with Sara as none of his romantic methods work for her. Throughout the entire process, he keeps his career secret, generically calling himself a "consultant".

Hitch meets with Vance Munson, a shallow misogynist attempting to get Hitch to help him land a one-night stand with Casey Sedgewick, Sara's coworker and best friend. Although Hitch refuses to help, Vance smugly misleads her into believing that he has used Hitch's services. After finding out Hitch's identity, Sara publishes what she believes she knows as an exposé, causing Albert to vandalize a newsstand in rage and get arrested, Allegra to break up with him, and Hitch's reputation to go into a downward spiral.

At a speed dating event that Hitch sneaks into, Sara and Casey confront him and cite Vance as their source. Hitch explains that not only did he refuse to work with him, but also the extent to which women must protect themselves from men like Vance makes it difficult to establish relationships with sincere men, creating a demand for Hitch's services.

After receiving some criticism from Albert about treating love as a job instead of a legitimate feeling, Hitch then tries to salvage Albert and Allegra's relationship by confronting her. When she mentions how Albert's quirks won her over, Hitch realizes he does not do anything significant besides giving his clients the confidence which allows them to get the attention of the women they love. Most of his customers, particularly Albert, really were successful by just being themselves. Allegra reconciles with Albert, and Hitch and Sara repair their relationship.

Albert and Allegra get married. During the reception, Casey gives the Heimlich maneuver to an elderly woman who is choking on a grape, which endears her to the woman's attractive grandson (it is revealed the elderly woman was working with Hitch). A dance party then begins with Albert, Allegra, Sara, and Hitch, which ends with Albert accidentally ripping his pants open while doing a split.

== Cast ==
- Will Smith as Alex "Hitch" Hitchens
- Eva Mendes as Sara Melas
- Kevin James as Albert Brennaman
- Amber Valletta as Allegra Cole
- Julie Ann Emery as Casey Sedgewick
- Philip Bosco as Mr. O'Brian
- Adam Arkin as Max
- Adam LeFevre as Speed Dating Guy
- Robinne Lee as Cressida Baylor
- Nathan Lee Graham as Geoff
- Michael Rapaport as Ben
- Jeffrey Donovan as Vance Munson
- Paula Patton as Mandy
- Maulik Pancholy as Raoul
- Kevin Sussman as Neil
- Ato Essandoh as Tanis
- Jeffrey Carlson as Egon
- Beau Sia as Drugstore Clerk
- Rain Phoenix as Kate
- Ptolemy Slocum as Ron

== Production ==
=== Development ===
The working title of the film was The Last First Kiss, referring to a line that Hitch delivers to Albert, "Tomorrow night Allegra Cole could have her last first kiss."

Smith has said that actress Eva Mendes, a Latina, was offered the female lead because the producers were worried about the public's reaction if the part was played by a white actress, creating a studio fear of a potential interracial taboo, or a black actress, creating a studio fear that two black leads would alienate the white audiences. It was believed that a Latina and a black lead would sidestep the issue. Patton Oswalt was considered for the role of Albert Brennaman, before Kevin James was cast.

=== Filming ===
Filming took place between March and June 2004. Parts of the film were filmed in Morningside Heights, Manhattan, at Columbia University, at Ellis Island, in the Fulton Fish Market, at the Wall Street Bull and the North Cove Marina.

The production budget was $55–70 million.

== Release ==
=== Box office ===
Hitch was theatrically released on February 11, 2005. Sony expected the film to open to $35 million, but the film performed above expectations, opening to $43,142,214. The film secured the highest opening weekend for a romantic comedy film, surpassing 50 First Dates. This record would last three years until Sex and the City opened in 2008. With a total gross of $7.5 million, the film held the record for having the highest mid-week Valentine's Day gross until 2012 when The Vow surpassed it. It spent three consecutive weeks at the number 1 position in the North American box office. Its worldwide box office take totaled $371.6 million, making it the tenth highest-grossing film of 2005 and the third highest-grossing romantic comedy film, after My Big Fat Greek Wedding and What Women Want.

=== Home media ===
Hitch was released on June 14, 2005, on VHS and DVD by Sony Pictures Home Entertainment. It was one of the first films to employ Sony's ARccOS Protection copy protection. The film was also available on UMD (Universal Media Disc) for the Sony PSP (PlayStation Portable).

== Reception ==
On Rotten Tomatoes, the film has a rating of 68% based on 186 reviews and an average review of 6.30/10. The site's critical consensus reads: "Despite Hitch's predictability, Will Smith and Kevin James win praise for their solid, warmhearted performances." On Metacritic, the film has a weighted average score of 58 out of 100, based on 36 critics, indicating "mixed or average" reviews. Audiences polled by CinemaScore gave the film an average grade of "A" on an A+ to F scale.

Roger Ebert of the Chicago Sun-Times wrote: "The premise is intriguing, and for a time it seems that the Date Doctor may indeed know things about women that most men in the movies are not allowed to know, but the third act goes on autopilot just when the Doctor should be in." Brian Lowry of Variety wrote: "Considerably heavier on romance than comedy, Hitch stitches together relatively few laughs but generates enough goodwill and energy."

== Remake ==
The film was remade in Hindi as Partner in 2007, which also incurred a lawsuit against the film's producers Sohail Khan and Parag Sanghvi, by Sony Pictures for copyright infringement. It was solved after Sony Pictures acquired the worldwide satellite rights to the film.

== Music ==
Hitch Soundtrack

Soundtrack album by Various Artists
- Released: February 8, 2005
- Studios: Larrabee North Recording Studios, Los Angeles, CA; Luminous Sound, Dallas, TX; Magnet Vision Studios, Santa Monica, CA; Morning View Studios, Malibu, CA; Sony Music Studios, New York, NY; Stewchia, Los Feliz, CA; The Dungeon, Dungeon East Recording Studios, Atlanta, GA
- Genres: R&B, funk, soul
- Length: 49:10
- Label: Columbia Records

Hitch: The Soundtrack was released on February 8, 2005, by Columbia Records. The album reached No. 5 on the Billboard Soundtrack Albums chart and No. 35 on the Billboard 200 chart.

=== Soundtrack ===
The soundtrack features artists such as Amerie, Kelly Rowland, Sleepy Brown, Big Boi, Earth, Wind & Fire, Mark Ronson, Martha Reeves and the Vandellas, Omarion, The O Jays, John Legend, The Temptations, Jimmy Cliff and Kevin Lyttle.

No.	Title	Performer	Length
1.	"1 Thing"	Amerie	4:02
2.	"Don't You Worry 'bout a Thing"	John Legend	4:46
3.	"This Is How I Feel"	Sleepy Brown, Big Boi, Earth, Wind & Fire, Kelly Rowland	4:13
4.	"Ooh Wee"	Mark Ronson	3:30
5.	"Now That We've Found Love"	Heavy D and the Boyz	4:19
6.	"Happy"	Joe Smith	3:54
7.	"Love Train"	The O'Jays	2:59
8.	"I Can't Get Next to You"	The Temptations	2:45
9.	"You Can Get It If You Really Want"	Jimmy Cliff	2:40
10.	"It's Easy to Fall in Love With a Guy Like You"	Martha Reeves and the Vandellas	2:18
11.	"Reasons"	Earth, Wind & Fire	5:01
12.	"Never Gonna Let You Go (She's a Keepa)"	Omarion	3:37
13.	"Turn Me On"	Kevin Lyttle	5:06
Total length:			49:10

Rob Theakston of AllMusic gave the album a three out of five star rating noting that it "features a brilliant survey of soul and R&B over the past three decades." He also proclaimed "while the new tracks are impressive and enjoyable, it's this combination that makes Hitch an enjoyable listen, with something for everyone -- regardless of age -- to enjoy."
