= George Wang (producer) =

American film producer

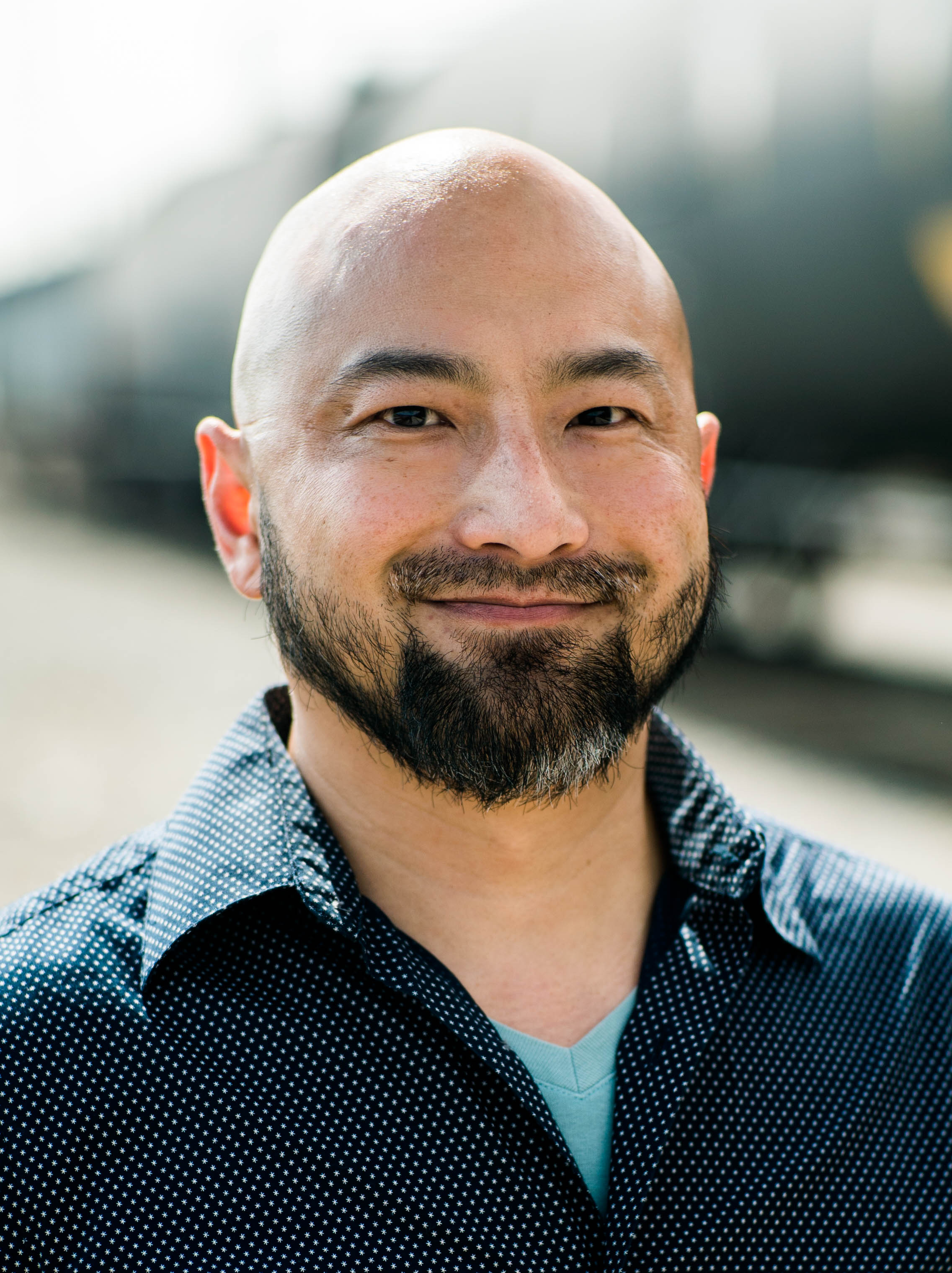
- George Wang
- Education: University of California Los Angeles
- Occupation: Producer
- Relatives: Dawen Wang (brother)
- Website: www.georgewang.com

George Wang
- Chinese: 王大元
Transcriptions
Standard Mandarin
- Hanyu Pinyin: Wáng Dàyuán

George Wang is a Taiwanese American film and television producer, best known for Snakehead (2021) and The Jade Pendant (2017). He is fluent in both English and Mandarin Chinese. His brother is Taiwanese American pop singer Dawen Wang.

== Career ==
=== Digital content ===
George Wang began his career in early 2011, producing his first short film, 3 Minutes with Don Le and director Ross Ching. Starring Harry Shum Jr. and Stephen “tWitch” Boss, with Katrina Law, 3 Minutes became Wang, Le, and Ching's breakout piece. Chosen as "Vimeo’s Staff Pick", 3 Minutes was also screened at the 2011 Los Angeles Asian Pacific Film Festival and other festival screenings that year including the Newport Beach Film Festival and Geneva International Film Festival Tous Ecrans.

From 2010 to 2012, Wang collaborated and produced digital content with noted talent such as Just Kidding Films, Poreotics, Wong Fu Productions, Kid David, Luigi, Tyler Shields, AJ Rafael, KevJumba, Jamie Chung, Japanese pop idol Jin Akanishi, Taiwan pop star Dawen, and many others.

=== Commercials & music videos ===
At the same time, Wang started branching out into commercial work and music videos. Notable clients include Chevrolet, Aéropostale, State Farm Insurance, and the 2015 spot, The Profiler for DirecTV.

During this period Wang began producing content in Asia, starting with Taiwan. His first project was producing a music video for Taiwan band Mayday 五月天 in America, shooting on locations throughout Nevada for Cang Jie 倉頡.

Some highlights include producing music videos for pop artists, Vanness Wu (吳建豪), Nana Lee (李千娜), Kimberly Chen (陳芳語), Dawen Wang (王大文), Wanting Qu (曲婉婷), and Vietnamese-American Mai Tiến Dũng’s Tối Nay Em Muốn Sao feat. L.J.

In addition to producing Taiwan content, Wang has collaborated with international brands such as Adidas, Facebook, and others.

=== Film and television ===
In 2012, Wang began his transition to television as the producer of the TV show Mashbox on Myx TV, with Teddy Zee serving as Executive Producer. In 2013, Mashbox was nominated for a NAMIC Visions Award (National Association for Multi-ethnicity in Communications), in the category of “Digital Media – Long Form”.

Wang followed Mashbox as the Supervising Producer for Season 3 of Short Notice, a TV series on Mnet America, a subsidiary of Korean giant CJ Entertainment. Wang also produced two episodes in Taiwan for Asia’s Got Talent (Season 1) in 2015 for FremantleMedia Asia.

In 2015, Wang worked on his first feature, The Jade Pendant (2017), starring Godfrey Gao and Clara Lee, as an Associate Producer. He followed in 2017 with his second feature, Snakehead (2021), starring Sung Kang and Shuya Chang, directed by Evan Jackson Leong, shot on location in Taiwan.

Wang is currently developing narrative content for feature film, television, and OTT.
