= Privy Circle =

- Company type: Private
- Area served: Worldwide
- Founder: Stephen Liu
- CEO: Stephen Liu
- Industry: Internet
- Website: www.www.privycircle.com
- Current status: Active

Privy Circle (formerly Privy.net) is a community of global influencers located throughout the Asia and Pacific regions. It was founded by businessman and entrepreneur Stephen Liu who also founded Asian Professional Exchange.

Privy Circle produces a series of curated online "Privy 5" city guides, which are open to the public. The current Privy 5 cities are Los Angeles, San Francisco, New York City and Shanghai. Notables featured in the Privy 5 guide include Jeremy Lin, Kelly Hu, Lisa Ling, John Cho, Daniel Wu, Jaeson Ma, Robin Shou, Vivienne Tam, Russell Wong, Joan Chen, Archie Kao, David Henry Hwang, Justin Chon, Liza Lapira, Lynn Chen and Aaron Yoo.

Privy Causes, the philanthropic arm of Privy Circle, created the National Asian Breast Cancer Initiative in 2013. It was formed to address the cultural, linguistic and genetic challenges that Asian women with breast cancer face.
