= Adrian Picardi =

American filmmaker

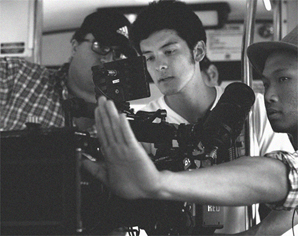
- Born: April 1987 (age 39); Los Angeles, California
- Occupations: Film director, cinematographer and screenwriter

Adrian Picardi (born April 1987) is an American filmmaker originally from South Pasadena, California. Picardi graduated from South Pasadena High School in 2005, and went on to graduate from the Los Angeles Film School in 2006. His professional career began after creating the television series The Resistance for the STARZ / SyFy Network. The series was produced by Sam Raimi's Ghost House Pictures. Currently, Picardi runs a production company named Aureus Grex, based out of Glendale, California and is represented under Brawler. Picardi has helmed commercial spots for PlayStation, Microsoft, Xbox, and Tom Clancy's The Division.

== Biography ==
=== Career ===
Picardi graduated from the Los Angeles Film School in 2006 at the age of 19 and jumped into the industry as an editor for Television. Picardi continued to pursue his directing career by independently producing his own projects. In 2007, Picardi created a short film called "His Day to Remember," which was the Grand Prize Winner in the Cinematic Film2Music online competition. Using the raw, percussive chant-driven track "Steel & Sky," he created a visually compelling drama about a young man who is apparently a suicide bomber.

The film was also screened at the Sundance Film Festival 2007 and got him featured on MTVu.com as "Best Filmmaker on Campus" in December 2007. Additionally, In 2007, he won the "Audience Award" for Myspace's John Woo Film Tribute contest for the Chow Yun-fat videogame "Stranglehold". For his second short, "His Final Hit", it placed into the top ten finalists of the IFC Film "Assassin's Creed" Film Contest.

Soon after, Picardi and his team created a low-budget web series called "The Resistance" which started off as 4 short online teasers featured on YouTube. Before filming the actual web show, the series was picked up by Sam Raimi’s Ghost House Pictures and Starz Media, after executives at Starz and Ghost House viewed "The Resistance" teasers online. The web show aired on October 4, 2010, on the SyFy channel as a one-hour television pilot along with being released in its original 8 episodic form on iTunes, Xbox Live, and the PlayStation Network. "The Resistance" is executive produced by Ben Ketai, Scott Bayless, Scott Rogers, with producers Aaron Lam, and Associate Producer Don Le. The pilot will reportedly make history, as it's the first time a series created originally for the web will first premiere on television.

Picardi won the Universal Music / Decca Records online music video contest hosted by Talenthouse, for the band ERA, . He also took home the Grand Prize award for the New York Times best-selling author Scott Sigler’s "Ancestor" film contest. He also wrapped two more music videos, one for the band Automatic Love Letter and Sony Music Entertainment / Epic Records, and another for the band Evans Blue.

== 2012–present ==
In 2012, Picardi and Airsoft GI created a fan film based on the videogame series Left 4 Dead. Within 4 days of releasing the initial teaser, the clip amassed over 2.5 million views and massive buzz online, including outlets such as PC Gamer, Complex, Game Informer, and Valve (creators of the game itself).

In early 2013, Picardi created the production company Aureus Grex alongside his long time best friend, Sunny Jain.

In 2016, Aureus Grex and Corridor Digital teamed up to release a series of live-action spots for Ubisoft and Tom Clancy's The Division entitled Agent Origins. Picardi directed, shot, and edited three of the four episodes titled Escape, Ashes, and Conspiracies.

Currently, Picardi is developing two feature films, as well as a project with Warner Brother's digital arm, Blue Ribbon Content.

== Filmography ==
Year	Film	Role	Notes
2007	His Day To Remember (short film)	Director, writer, Cinematographer, editor	
2007	His Final Fight (John Woo Stranglehold game contest "Audience Award" winner)	Director, writer, Cinematographer, editor	
2007	His Final Hit (Top 10 Finalist in IFC "Assassin's Creed" Contest)	Director, writer, Cinematographer, editor	
2009	Makeup Smeared Eyes (music video) - Automatic Love Letter	Director, writer, Cinematographer, editor	
2010	Erase My Scars (music video) - Evans Blue	Director, writer, Cinematographer, editor	
2010	The Resistance Series	Director, Story By	
2012	Left 4 Dead (film)	Director, editor	
2014	Playstation "DriveClub" TV spot	Director	
2016	LemonCove TV-Mini Series	Director / Creator	
2016	Tom Clancy's The Division: Agent Origins	Director	
2016	"Rush: Inspired by Battlefield"	Cinematographer	
2017	Lifeline	Cinematographer	
2018	ROT - Silent Hill (short film)	Director	
