= Eric Ro =

- Born: Los Angeles, California, U.S.
- Occupation: Producer
- Years active: 2007-present

Eric Ro is an American producer based in Los Angeles.

== Career ==
In 2008, Ro produced an original series, The Resistance, for Starz Media, co-produced by Sam Raimi’s Ghost House Pictures. Set in a post apocalyptic world, The Resistance aired on SyFy channel.

He has produced countless branded content and commercials for companies including Warner Bros., Marvel Studios, Synchrony Financial, Amazon and Ubisoft, as well as music videos for The Chainsmokers and Avicii.

His latest film, Luce, starring Naomi Watts, Octavia Spencer, Tim Roth and Kelvin Harrison Jr., held its world premiere at the 2019 Sundance Film Festival on opening weekend. Shortly after, Luce was acquired for domestic distribution rights by NEON & Topic Studios. Focus Features landed international distribution. The film also premiered at Tribeca Film Festival, among others. Luce is scheduled for theatrical release on August 2, 2019.
