= DC Entertainment =

American entertainment company

- Logo used since 2024

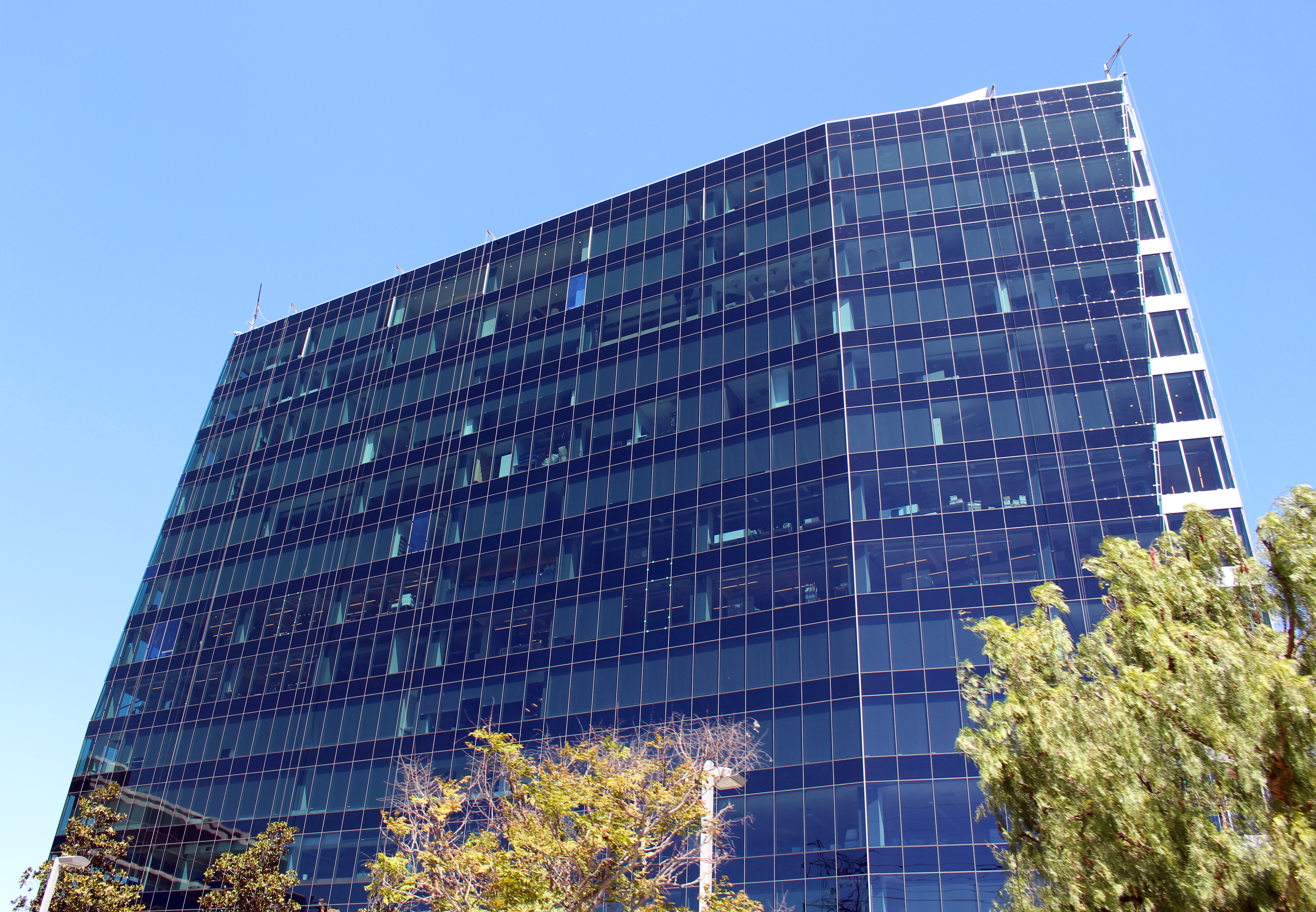
- Headquarters at 2900 West Alameda Avenue, Burbank, California.
- Type: Subsidiary
- Industry: Entertainment
- Genre: Superhero fiction
- Founded: September 9, 2009; 17 years ago
- Headquarters: 2900 West Alameda Avenue, Burbank, California, United States
- Area served: Worldwide
- Products: Books; Comics; Podcasts; Video games; Films; Television series; Webcasts
- Services: Licensing
- Parent: WarnerMedia (2009–2022); Warner Bros. Discovery (2022–2026); Skydance Corporation (2026–present)
- Website: dc.com

DC Entertainment is an American entertainment company and the parent company of DC Comics owned by Warner Bros. Entertainment, a subsidiary of Skydance Corporation. Founded on 9 September 2009 and based in Burbank, California, it manages the DC Extended Universe and their flagship DC Universe (DCU) franchise, the latter since 2025. DC Entertainment was reported to be reorganized into its own vertical unit rather than being handled by other Warner Bros. subsidiaries on its behalf following the merger of WarnerMedia with Discovery, Inc. on April 8, 2022.

== History ==
=== Formation ===
On September 9, 2009, Warner Bros. announced that DC Comics would become a subsidiary of DC Entertainment, Inc., with Diane Nelson, President of Warner Premiere, becoming president of the newly formed holding company and DC Comics President and Publisher Paul Levitz moving to the position of Contributing Editor and Overall Consultant there. Warner Bros. and DC Comics have been owned by the same company since.

On February 18, 2010, DC Entertainment named Jim Lee and Dan DiDio as Co-Publishers of DC Comics, Geoff Johns as Chief Creative Officer, John Rood as EVP (Executive Vice President) of Sales, Marketing and Business Development, and Patrick Caldon as EVP of Finance and Administration.

=== Property expansion ===
In October 2013, DC Entertainment announced that the DC Comics offices were going to move in 2015 from New York City to the headquarters of Warner Bros. in Burbank, California. The other units, animation, film, television and portfolio planning, had preceded DC Comics by moving there in 2010.

DC Entertainment announced its first franchise, the DC Super Hero Girls universe, in April 2015 with multi-platform content, toys and apparel to start appearing in 2016.

Warner Bros. Pictures reorganized in May 2016 to have genre-responsible film executives; thus, DC Entertainment franchise films under Warner Bros. were placed under a newly created division, DC Films, created under Warner Bros. executive vice president Jon Berg and DC chief content officer Geoff Johns. This was done in the same vein as Marvel Studios in unifying DC-related filmmaking under a single vision and clarifying the greenlighting process. Johns also kept his existing role at DC Comics. Johns was promoted to DC president and CCO with the addition of his DC Films while still reporting to DCE President Nelson. In August 2016, Amit Desai was promoted from senior vice president, marketing & global franchise management, to exec vice president, business and marketing strategy, direct-to-consumer and global franchise management.

=== Digital distribution ===
DC Comics are available in digital form through several sources. Free services: In 2015, Hoopla Digital became the first library-based digital system to distribute DC Comics.

In April 2017, DC announced an upcoming streaming service with Warner Bros. Digital Networks, which was to feature original live-action and animated series based on DC characters and franchises, such as Titans and Young Justice: Outsiders. The service, later announced as DC Universe, would launch in September 2018, and also feature access to classic DC television series and digital comics.

With frustration over DC Films not matching Marvel Studios's results and Berg wanting to step back to being a producer in January 2018, it was announced that Warner Bros. executive Walter Hamada was appointed president of DC film production. After a leave of absence starting in March 2018, Diane Nelson resigned as president of DC Entertainment. The company's executive management was to report to WB Chief Digital Officer Thomas Gewecke until a new president was selected.

=== DC Entertainment, LLC ===
In June 2018, Johns was also moved out of his position as chief creative officer and DC Entertainment president for a writing and producing deal with the DC and WB companies. Jim Lee added the DC Entertainment chief creative officer title to his DC co-publisher post. In September 2018, DC became part of the newly founded Warner Bros. Global Brands and Franchises division overseen by Pam Lifford. In January 2019, it was reported that 7 of DC's 240-person workforce were laid off, including several vice presidents.

In August 2020, DC publisher Jim Lee announced that DC Universe's original productions would migrate to WarnerMedia's new streaming service, HBO Max, with the majority of the staff of DC Universe having been laid off. In January 2021, the remainder of the service would become a comics-centric service known as DC Universe Infinite. The service would feature DC titles six months after their retail release date (comparable to Marvel Unlimited), early access to DC Comics' digital-first titles, exclusive comics created for the service, and access to 24,000 titles in DC's back catalog.

==== Warner Bros. Discovery subsidiary ====
On April 14, 2022, after the merger of parent company WarnerMedia with Discovery, Inc., it was reported that the company was exploring a restructuring of DC Entertainment into a "solidified content vertical" more akin to Marvel, with its film, television, and video game development brought directly under DC with a central leader, rather than being handled by other Warner Bros. subsidiaries on its behalf. In August 2022, DC relaunched its website at DC.com, while also dropping "comics" from the usernames of its other social media outlets.

In November 2022, the DC Films division of Warner Bros. Pictures was replaced by DC Studios, which would be led by co-chairmen James Gunn and Peter Safran under a four-year deal to oversee film, television, and animation productions involving DC properties. They reported directly to the then-CEO of WBD, David Zaslav, while also working with Warner Bros. Pictures's Michael De Luca and Pamela Abdy among others.

In May 2023, Lee was promoted to president, publisher, and chief creative officer of DC, continuing to report to Pam Lifford as president of Global Brands and Experiences.

== Units ==
- Mad
- DC Comics

=== Defunct ===
- DC Universe (SVOD) – shut down with catalog absorbed into HBO Max; spun off into DC Universe Infinite

== Executives ==
=== Presidents ===
- Diane Nelson (September 9, 2009 – June 6, 2018)
- Geoff Johns (2016–2018)

=== Others ===
- Geoff Johns, Chief Creative Officer, DC Entertainment (2010–2018)

== Productions ==
=== Films ===
All the films are distributed by Warner Bros. Pictures, except as indicated.

==== Live action ====
Year	Title	Director	Co-production(s)	Notes
2010	Jonah Hex	Jimmy Hayward	Legendary Pictures / Weed Road Pictures	Loosely based on the character of the same name.
2010	Red	Robert Schwentke	Di Bonaventura Pictures	Based on the miniseries by Warren Ellis and Cully Hamner. WildStorm (an imprint of DC Comics). Distributed by Summit Entertainment.
2011	Green Lantern	Martin Campbell	De Line Pictures	
2012	The Dark Knight Rises	Christopher Nolan	Warner Bros. Pictures / Legendary Pictures / Syncopy Inc.	The Dark Knight Trilogy.
2013	Man of Steel	Zack Snyder	Warner Bros. Pictures / Legendary Pictures / Syncopy Inc.	The first film to be set in the DC Extended Universe.
2013	Red 2	Dean Parisot	Di Bonaventura Pictures	Based on the miniseries by Warren Ellis and Cully Hamner. WildStorm (an imprint of DC Comics). Distributed by Summit Entertainment (Lionsgate).
2016	Batman v Superman: Dawn of Justice	Zack Snyder	Warner Bros. Pictures / RatPac Entertainment / Cruel and Unusual Films / Atlas Entertainment	R-rated extended version, the Ultimate Edition, was released on home video in 2016 and is the second film to be set in the DC Extended Universe.

==== Animated film ====
All the films are made for Direct-to-video/television and produced by Warner Bros. Animation, except as indicated.

Year	Title	Notes
2009	Superman/Batman: Public Enemies	Based on "Superman/Batman: Public Enemies" storyline by Jeph Loeb and Ed McGuinness.
2010	Justice League: Crisis on Two Earths	Adapted from an unused film plot meant to bridge Justice League and Justice League Unlimited. Loosely based on the JLA: Earth 2 graphic novel by Grant Morrison and Frank Quitely.
2010	Batman: Under the Red Hood	Loosely based on the "Batman: Under the Hood" storyline by Judd Winick.
2010	Superman/Batman: Apocalypse	Sequel to Superman/Batman: Public Enemies. Based on the "Superman/Batman: The Supergirl from Krypton" storyline by Jeph Loeb and Michael Turner.
2011	All-Star Superman	Based on the All-Star Superman series by Grant Morrison and Frank Quitely.
2011	Green Lantern: Emerald Knights	Collection of six shorts.
2011	Batman: Year One	Based on the "Batman: Year One" storyline by Frank Miller and David Mazzucchelli.
2012	Justice League: Doom	Loosely based on the "JLA: Tower of Babel" storyline by Mark Waid.
2012	Superman vs. The Elite	Based on the "What's So Funny About Truth, Justice & the American Way?" storyline by Joe Kelly.
2012	Robot Chicken DC Comics Special	TV Special: Aired on Adult Swim
2012	Batman: The Dark Knight Returns – Part 1	Based on The Dark Knight Returns series by Frank Miller.
2013	Batman: The Dark Knight Returns – Part 2	Based on The Dark Knight Returns series by Frank Miller.
2013	Superman: Unbound	Based on the "Superman: Brainiac" storyline by Geoff Johns and Gary Frank.
2013	Lego Batman: The Movie – DC Super Heroes Unite	Produced by TT Animation. Based on the video game Lego Batman 2: DC Super Heroes.
2013	Justice League: The Flashpoint Paradox	First film set in the DC Animated Movie Universe. Based on the "Flashpoint" storyline by Geoff Johns and Andy Kubert.
2014	JLA Adventures: Trapped in Time	
2014	Justice League: War	Second film set in the DC Animated Movie Universe. Based on The New 52's "Justice League: Origin" story by Geoff Johns and Jim Lee.
2014	Robot Chicken DC Comics Special 2: Villains in Paradise	TV Special: Aired on Adult Swim
2014	Son of Batman	Third film set in the DC Animated Movie Universe. Based on the "Batman and Son" storyline by Grant Morrison and Andy Kubert.
2014	Batman: Assault on Arkham	Set in the universe of the Batman: Arkham video game franchise.
2015	Justice League: Throne of Atlantis	Fourth film set in the DC Animated Movie Universe. Based on the "Throne of Atlantis" storyline, The New 52's Aquaman crossover story by Geoff Johns.
2015	Lego DC Comics Super Heroes: Justice League vs. Bizarro League	Television movie.
2015	Batman vs. Robin	Fifth film set in the DC Animated Movie Universe. Partially based on The New 52's Batman crossover story, "Court of Owls" by Scott Snyder and Greg Capullo.
2015	Batman Unlimited: Animal Instincts	First film set in the universe of Batman Unlimited, a line of action figures.
2015	Justice League: Gods and Monsters	Set in the same universe as the companion microseries of shorts Justice League: Gods and Monsters Chronicles.
2015	Batman Unlimited: Monster Mayhem	Second film set in the universe of Batman Unlimited, a line of action figures.
2015	Lego DC Comics Super Heroes: Justice League – Attack of the Legion of Doom	
2015	Robot Chicken DC Comics Special III: Magical Friendship	TV Special: Aired on Adult Swim
2016	Batman: Bad Blood	Sixth film set in the DC Animated Movie Universe.
2016	Lego DC Comics Super Heroes: Justice League – Cosmic Clash	
2016	DC Super Hero Girls: Super Hero High	Set in the DC Super Hero Girls animated shorts universe. Released first on television.
2016	Justice League vs. Teen Titans	Seventh film set in the DC Animated Movie Universe.
2016	DC Super Hero Girls: Hero of the Year	Set in the DC Super Hero Girls animated shorts universe.
2016	Lego DC Comics Super Heroes: Justice League – Gotham City Breakout	
2016	Batman Unlimited: Mechs vs. Mutants	Third film set in the universe of Batman Unlimited, a line of action figures.
2017	Justice League Dark	Eighth film set in the DC Animated Movie Universe.
2017	Teen Titans: The Judas Contract	Ninth film set in the DC Animated Movie Universe. Based on "The Judas Contract" story arc by Marv Wolfman and George Pérez.
2017	Vixen: The Movie	Episode Collection: Arrowverse; features added new content
2017	DC Super Hero Girls: Intergalactic Games	Set in the DC Super Hero Girls animated shorts universe.
2017	Batman and Harley Quinn	Set in the DC Animated Universe.
2017	Lego DC Super Hero Girls: Brain Drain	
2017	Batman vs. Two-Face	Set in the universe of the 1960s Batman TV series.
2018	Scooby-Doo! & Batman: The Brave and the Bold	Crossover with Scooby-Doo. Set in the universe of the Batman: The Brave and the Bold TV series.
2018	Batman: Gotham by Gaslight	Based on Gotham by Gaslight, a one-shot story by Brian Augustyn and Mike Mignola which became, retroactively, the first official Elseworlds publication.
2018	Lego DC Comics Super Heroes: The Flash	
2018	Suicide Squad: Hell to Pay	Tenth film set in the DC Animated Movie Universe.
2018	Batman Ninja	Anime produced by Kamikaze Douga Yamatoworks and Barnum Studio.
2018	Lego DC Super Hero Girls: Super-Villain High	
2018	The Death of Superman	Eleventh film in DC Animated Movie Universe. Based on "The Death of Superman" storyline.
2018	Lego DC Comics Super Heroes: Aquaman – Rage of Atlantis	
2018	DC Super Hero Girls: Legends of Atlantis	Set in the DC Super Hero Girls animated shorts universe.
2018	Freedom Fighters: The Ray	Episode Collection: Arrowverse; features added new content
2018	Constantine: City of Demons: The Movie	Episode Collection: DC Animated Movie Universe
2019	Reign of the Supermen	Twelfth film in the DC Animated Movie Universe. Based on the "Reign of the Supermen" storyline.
2019	Justice League vs. the Fatal Five	Set in the DC Animated Universe.
2019	DC Super Hero Girls: Sweet Justice	Episode Collection: Television movie; compilation of the first four episodes of DC Super Hero Girls.
2019	Batman vs. Teenage Mutant Ninja Turtles	Based on the Batman/Teenage Mutant Ninja Turtles comic book by James Tynion IV and Freddie Williams II. First film collaboration with Nickelodeon.
2019	Batman: Hush	Thirteenth film in the DC Animated Movie Universe. Based on the "Batman: Hush" storyline by Jeph Loeb and Jim Lee.
2019	Lego DC: Batman – Family Matters	
2019	Teen Titans Go! vs. Teen Titans	A crossover film between Teen Titans Go! and the original Teen Titans animated series.
2019	Wonder Woman: Bloodlines	Fourteenth film in the DC Animated Movie Universe.
2020	Superman: Red Son	Based on the Superman: Red Son comic book by Mark Millar.
2020	Lego DC Shazam! Magic and Monsters	
2020	Justice League Dark: Apokolips War	Fifteenth and last film in the DC Animated Movie Universe.
2020	Deathstroke: Knights & Dragons: The Movie	Episode Collection: Stand-alone.
2020	Superman: Man of Tomorrow	First film in the Tomorrowverse.
2021	Batman: Soul of the Dragon	
2021	Justice Society: World War II	Second film in the Tomorrowverse.
2021	Teen Titans Go! See Space Jam	A crossover film between Teen Titans Go! and Space Jam. Aired on Cartoon Network.
2021	Batman: The Long Halloween, Part One	Third film in the Tomorrowverse. Based on Batman: The Long Halloween by Jeph Loeb and Tim Sale.
2021	Batman: The Long Halloween, Part Two	Third film in the Tomorrowverse. Based on Batman: The Long Halloween by Jeph Loeb and Tim Sale.
2021	Injustice	Based on Injustice: Gods Among Us video game by NetherRealm Studios, and the tie-in comics by Tom Taylor.
2021	Beebo Saves Christmas	TV Special: Berlanti Productions; aired on The CW.
2022	Catwoman: Hunted	Anime-inspired.
2022	Teen Titans Go! & DC Super Hero Girls: Mayhem in the Multiverse	A crossover film between Teen Titans Go! and DC Super Hero Girls animated series.
2022	Green Lantern: Beware My Power	Fourth film in the Tomorrowverse.
2022	Batman and Superman: Battle of the Super Sons	
2023	Legion of Super-Heroes	Fifth film in the Tomorrowverse.
2023	Batman: The Doom That Came to Gotham	Based on comic book miniseries of the same name by Mike Mignola and Richard Pace. It is the 50th installment in the DC Universe Animated Original Movies.
2023	Justice League x RWBY: Super Heroes and Huntsmen	A crossover with RWBY. Collaboration with Rooster Teeth Productions.
2023	Scooby-Doo! and Krypto, Too!	Second crossover with Scooby-Doo.
2023	Justice League: Warworld	Sixth film in the Tomorrowverse.
2023	Merry Little Batman	Released on Amazon Prime Video Originally slated to be released on HBO Max and Cartoon Network
2024	Justice League: Crisis on Infinite Earths, Part One	Seventh and final film in the Tomorrowverse. Based on the Crisis on Infinite Earths miniseries by Marv Wolfman and George Pérez.
2024	Justice League: Crisis on Infinite Earths, Part Two	Seventh and final film in the Tomorrowverse. Based on the Crisis on Infinite Earths miniseries by Marv Wolfman and George Pérez.
2024	Justice League: Crisis on Infinite Earths, Part Three	Seventh and final film in the Tomorrowverse. Based on the Crisis on Infinite Earths miniseries by Marv Wolfman and George Pérez.
2024	Watchmen – Chapter I	Based on the graphic novel series of the same name by Alan Moore and Dave Gibbons. First film collaboration with Paramount Pictures.
2024	Watchmen – Chapter II	Based on the graphic novel series of the same name by Alan Moore and Dave Gibbons. First film collaboration with Paramount Pictures.
2025	Batman Ninja vs. Yakuza League	Sequel to Batman Ninja. Anime produced by Kamikaze Douga.
2026	Batman: Knightfall – Part 1: Knightfall	Based on the "Batman: Knightfall" storyline.
2026	Batman: Knightfall – Part 2: Knightquest	Based on the "Batman: Knightfall" storyline.
2027	Batman: Knightfall – Part 3: KnightsEnd	Based on the "Batman: Knightfall" storyline.

==== Theatrical release ====
Year	Title	Director	Co-production(s)	Notes
2016	Batman: The Killing Joke	Sam Liu	The Answer Studio	Limited release from Fathom Events and Vue. Based on the one-shot graphic novel of the same name by Alan Moore and Brian Bolland, which served as the basis for the first R-rated film in the Batman franchise.
2016	Batman: Return of the Caped Crusaders	Rick Morales		Limited release from Fathom Events for one night only. Set in the universe of the 1960s Batman TV series.
2017	The Lego Batman Movie	Chris McKay	Animal Logic	Spin-off of The Lego Movie.
2018	Teen Titans Go! To the Movies	Peter Rida Michail; Aaron Horvath		Set in the universe of the Teen Titans Go! TV series.
2022	DC League of Super-Pets	Jared Stern	Warner Animation Group / Seven Bucks Productions	
2025	Aztec Batman: Clash of Empires	Juan Meza-León	Ánima / Chatrone / Particular Crowd	Theatrical release in Mexico and Colombia.

==== Short films ====
All short films are direct-to-video are produced by Warner Bros. Animation, except as indicated.

Year	Title	Collection	Notes
2010	Joker's Playhouse	DC Super Friends	A one-off special short, produced as part of Fisher-Price's Imaginext product line.
2010	The Spectre	DC Showcase	Included in Justice League: Crisis on Two Earths.
2010	Jonah Hex	DC Showcase	Included in Batman: Under the Red Hood.
2010	Green Arrow	DC Showcase	Included in Superman/Batman: Apocalypse.
2010	Superman/Shazam!: The Return of Black Adam	DC Showcase	Included in DC Showcase Shorts Collection.
2011	Catwoman	DC Showcase	Included in Batman: Year One.
2015	Nightwing and Robin	DC Animated Movie Universe	Included in Justice League: Throne of Atlantis. Part of the DCAMU.
2015	Constantine: John Con Noir	Constantine	Produced by Cool Town Claymation; part of the promotion of the TV series Constantine.
2018	#TheLateBatsby	DC Super Hero Girls	Theatrical; Appeared in front of Teen Titans Go! To the Movies.
2019	Sgt. Rock	DC Showcase	Included in Batman: Hush.
2019	Death	DC Showcase	Included in Wonder Woman: Bloodlines.
2020	The Phantom Stranger	DC Showcase	Included in Superman: Red Son.
2020	Adam Strange	DC Showcase	Included in Justice League Dark: Apokolips War.
2020	Batman: Death in the Family	DC Showcase	Interactive movie. Follow-up to Batman: Under the Red Hood. Based on the Batman: A Death in the Family storyline by Jim Starlin and Jim Aparo.
2021	Kamandi: The Last Boy on Earth!	DC Showcase	Included in Justice Society: World War II.
2021	The Losers	DC Showcase	Included in Batman: The Long Halloween, Part One.
2021	Blue Beetle	DC Showcase	Included in Batman: The Long Halloween, Part Two.
2022	Constantine: The House of Mystery	DC Showcase	A long-form animated short. Sequel to Justice League Dark: Apokolips War.

=== Television ===
All television series are (co-)produced by Warner Bros. Television Studios, except as indicated.

==== Live-action ====
Title	Aired	Production companies	Network(s)	Notes
Human Target	2010–2011	Wonderland Sound and Vision	Fox / CTV	
Arrow	2012–2020	Berlanti Productions	The CW	Part of the Arrowverse
Gotham	2014–2019	Primrose Hill Productions	Fox	
The Flash	2014–2023	Bonanza Productions / Berlanti Productions	The CW	Part of the Arrowverse
Constantine	2014–2015	Ever After Productions / Phantom Four Films	NBC	Part of the Arrowverse
Supergirl	2015–2021	Berlanti Productions	CBS (season 1); The CW (seasons 2–6)	Part of the Arrowverse
Legends of Tomorrow	2016–2022	Berlanti Productions	The CW	Part of the Arrowverse
Lucifer	2016–2021	Jerry Bruckheimer Television	Fox (seasons 1–3); Netflix (seasons 4–6)	Based on Vertigo Comics. Arrowverse adjacent.
Powerless	2017	Ehsugadee Productions	NBC	
Black Lightning	2018–2021	Berlanti Productions / Akil Productions	The CW	Part of the Arrowverse
Krypton	2018–2019	Warner Horizon Television (Warner Bros. Television) / Phantom Four Films	Syfy	
Titans	2018–2023	Weed Road Pictures / Berlanti Productions	DC Universe (seasons 1–2); HBO Max (seasons 3–4)	Arrowverse adjacent
Swamp Thing	2019	Big Shoe Productions, Inc. / Atomic Monster	DC Universe	Arrowverse adjacent
Watchmen	2019	Paramount Television / White Rabbit	HBO	
Doom Patrol	2019–2023	Berlanti Productions / Jeremy Carver Productions	DC Universe (seasons 1–2); HBO Max/Max (seasons 2–4)	Arrowverse adjacent. Spin-off of Titans.
Batwoman	2019–2022	Berlanti Productions	The CW	Part of the Arrowverse
Pennyworth	2019–2023	Warner Horizon Television ((season 1 only) Warner Bros. Television) / Primrose Hill Productions	Epix (seasons 1–2); HBO Max (season 3)	Set in the same universe as Gotham
Stargirl	2020–2022	Mad Ghost Productions / Berlanti Productions	DC Universe (season 1); The CW (seasons 1–3)	Arrowverse adjacent
Superman & Lois	2021–2024	Berlanti Productions	The CW	Arrowverse adjacent
Naomi	2022	ARRAY Filmworks	The CW	
The Sandman	2022–2025	PurePop; The Blank Corporation; Phantom Four	Netflix	
DMZ	2022	ARRAY Filmworks / Analog	HBO Max	Based on Vertigo Comics
Gotham Knights	2023	Berlanti Productions	The CW	
Dead Boy Detectives	2024	Berlanti Productions; Ghost Octopus	Netflix	Set in the same universe as The Sandman

==== Animated series ====
Title	Aired	Production companies	Network(s)
Batman: The Brave and the Bold	2008–2011	Warner Bros. Animation / DC Comics (2008–09)	Cartoon Network
Young Justice	2010–2013; 2019–2022	Warner Bros. Animation	Cartoon Network (seasons 1–2); DC Universe (season 3); HBO Max (season 4)
Green Lantern: The Animated Series	2011–2013	Warner Bros. Animation	Cartoon Network
Beware the Batman	2013–2014	Warner Bros. Animation	Cartoon Network / Adult Swim
Teen Titans Go!	2013–present	Warner Bros. Animation	Cartoon Network
Justice League Action	2016–2018	Warner Bros. Animation	Cartoon Network
DC Super Hero Girls	2019–2021	Warner Bros. Animation	Cartoon Network
Harley Quinn	2019–2025	Warner Bros. Animation / Yes, Norman Productions / Delicious Non-Sequitur / Lorey Stories	DC Universe (seasons 1–2); HBO Max / Max (seasons 3–5)
Batwheels	2022–present	Warner Bros. Animation / Bang Zoom Ltd.	Cartoonito
My Adventures with Superman (seasons 1–2)	2023–2024	Warner Bros. Animation	Adult Swim
Kite Man: Hell Yeah!	2024	Warner Bros. Animation / Yes, Norman Productions / Delicious Non-Sequitur / Lorey Stories	Max
Batman: Caped Crusader (season 1)	2024	Warner Bros. Animation / Bad Robot / 6th & Idaho / Amazon MGM Studios	Amazon Prime Video
Bat-Fam	2025–present	Warner Bros. Animation / Amazon MGM Studios	Amazon Prime Video

==== Short series ====
Title	Aired	Production companies	Network	Notes
DC Nation Shorts	2011–2014	Warner Bros. Animation	Cartoon Network	Animated shorts aired as interstitials on the DC Nation television block on Cartoon Network
Batman Unlimited	2015–2016	Warner Bros. Animation	YouTube (DC Kids Channel)	
DC Super Friends	2015	Warner Bros. Animation / Imaginext / Titmouse, Inc.	YouTube (DC Kids Channel)	
Justice League: Gods and Monsters Chronicles	2015	Warner Bros. Animation / Blue Ribbon Content	YouTube (Machinima channel)	Related to the film. Renewed for season 2, but subsequently shelved indefinitely
Vixen	2015–2016	Warner Bros. Animation / Blue Ribbon Content	CW Seed	Part of the Arrowverse.
DC Super Hero Girls	2015–2018	Warner Bros. Animation	YouTube (DC Super Hero Girls channel)	
Justice League Action Shorts	2017	Warner Bros. Animation	YouTube (DC Kids Channel)	
Freedom Fighters: The Ray	2017–2018	Warner Bros. Animation / Blue Ribbon Content	CW Seed	Part of the Arrowverse.
Constantine: City of Demons	2018–2019	Warner Bros. Animation / Blue Ribbon Content / Berlanti Productions / Phantom Four Productions	CW Seed	Part of The DC Animated Movie Universe
DC Super Hero Girls: Super Shorts	2019–2020	Warner Bros. Animation	YouTube (DC Super Hero Girls channel)	
Deathstroke: Knights & Dragons	2020	Warner Bros. Animation / Blue Ribbon Content / Berlanti Productions	CW Seed	
Aquaman: King of Atlantis	2021	Warner Bros. Animation / Atomic Monster	HBO Max; Cartoon Network	

== See also ==
- DC Studios
- DC Extended Universe
- DC Universe (franchise)
- Lists of DC Comics characters
- List of current DC Comics publications
- List of unproduced DC Comics projects
- List of video games based on DC Comics
