= Batman: Gotham Knight =

Japanese-South Korean-American animated superhero film

- Home video release poster
- Directed by: Shōjirō Nishimi (#1); Futoshi Higashide (#2); Hiroshi Morioka (#3); Yasuhiro Aoki (#4); Toshiyuki Kubooka (#5); Jong-Sik Nam (#6); Yoshiaki Kawajiri (#6, uncredited)
- Screenplay by: Josh Olson (#1); Greg Rucka (#2); Jordan Goldberg (#3); David Goyer (#4); Brian Azzarello (#5); Alan Burnett (#6)
- Story by: Jordan Goldberg
- Based on: Batman by Bill Finger and Bob Kane
- Produced by: Toshi Hiruma; Eiko Tanaka (#1, 5); Mitsuhisa Ishikawa (#2); Kōichi Mashimo (#3); Jungo Maruta (#4); Alex Yeh (#4); Masao Maruyama (#4, 6)
- Starring: Kevin Conroy; Gary Dourdan; David McCallum; Parminder Nagra; Ana Ortiz
- Edited by: Joe Gall; Mutsumi Takemiya (#1, 5); Taeko Hamauzu (#2); Bee Train (#3); Kashiko Kimura (#4)
- Music by: Christopher Drake (#1, 4); Kevin Manthei (#2, 5); Robert J. Kral (#3, 6)
- Production companies: Warner Bros. Animation; DC Comics; Studio 4°C (#1, 5); Production I.G (#2); Bee Train Production (#3); Madhouse (Note: With Dong Woo Animation as its animation production assistant on segment #6.) (#4, 6)
- Distributed by: Warner Home Video (Note: Released under the Warner Premiere label.)
- Release date: July 8, 2008
- Running time: 76 minutes
- Countries: United States; South Korea; Japan
- Languages: English; Japanese; Spanish; Portuguese; Thai

Batman: Gotham Knight is a 2008 American anime-influenced adult animated superhero anthology film based on the DC Comics superhero of the same name. Set within The Dark Knight trilogy, specifically between Batman Begins and The Dark Knight, the film depicts Batman battling against the mob of Gotham City, as well as other villains such as the Scarecrow, Killer Croc, and Deadshot. Although the movie is an anthology, each segment is part of one overarching story, though they are also told through various animation studios from Japan and South Korea.

It is the third film of the DC Universe Animated Original Movies released by Warner Premiere and Warner Bros. Animation; with the first two releases being Superman: Doomsday and Justice League: The New Frontier. This film is also notable for being the first DC Original Animated movie to have a connection with another Batman medium.

== Production ==
The film consists of six anthology segments produced by Japanese animation studios Studio 4°C, Madhouse, Bee Train and Production I.G and the South Korean animation studio Dong Woo Animation in association with DC Comics and Warner Bros. Animation. The shorts are written by Josh Olson, David S. Goyer, Brian Azzarello, Greg Rucka, Jordan Goldberg and Alan Burnett. Although all use Japanese anime art styles, each segment has its own writing and artistic style, similar to other DC Universe works and The Animatrix; however, some segments are connected, giving it the nickname, "The Batimatrix". All six segments of the anthology film star Kevin Conroy, reprising his voice role as Batman from the DC Animated Universe. Christopher Nolan consulted on Batman: Gotham Knight, asking for the removal of Killer Croc's tail from an early design as he wanted to keep it grounded in some reality. Jonathan Nolan wrote the story springboards for Batman: Gotham Knight.

Although stated to take place within The Dark Knight trilogy, the producers have acknowledged that the plot from the anthology is not necessarily integral to the main story told within the films.

== Plot ==
Batman: Gotham Knight is split into six segments:

=== Have I Got a Story for You (Studio 4°C) ===
Have I Got a Story for You was written by Josh Olson and animated by Studio 4°C.

A street kid meets with his three friends at a skate park, to which all three of them claim to have seen Batman earlier that day. Batman's battle with the Man in Black, a high-tech criminal, is told in reverse chronological order with three different interpretations of Batman's form and abilities (in the style of the 1950 film Rashomon): one describes him as a living shadow that can melt away and reappear at will (similar to the Vampire Batman from the Batman & Dracula trilogy); another describes him as a half-human, half-bat creature (similar to the Man-Bat); and lastly, one describes him as a combat robot who can leap tall buildings in a single bound. At the end, Batman pursues the Man in Black to the skate park and captures him with the help of the fourth street kid. The fourth kid is able to see what Batman truly is after seeing him sustain injuries by a grenade blast from the battle: a human warrior in a costume. He then proceeds to tell his experience about seeing Batman to his friends after Batman disappears.

Voice cast

- Kevin Conroy as Bruce Wayne / Batman
- Jason Marsden as Cop
- Scott Menville as B-Devil
- George Newbern as Jacob Feely / Man in Black
- Corey Padnos as Porkchop
- Crystal Scales as Meesh
- Alanna Ubach as Dander
- Hynden Walch as Woman

=== Crossfire (Production I.G) ===
Crossfire was written by Greg Rucka and animated by Production I.G.

Crispus Allen and Anna Ramirez are partners and members of the Major Crimes Unit who have been hand-picked by Lieutenant James Gordon. The two are assigned to take the recently captured Man in Black (who was captured previously on Have I Got A Story For You), revealed to be Jacob Feely, an escaped inmate from Arkham Asylum with an expertise in advanced electronics and explosives, back to Arkham Asylum, which most of the Narrows has been converted into following the events of Batman Begins. On their way, they argue over whether Batman can be trusted, with Allen saying that they are just running errands for a vigilante, while Ramirez replies that Batman has changed Gotham for the better. As they are heading back, Allen declares his intention to leave the MCU and Ramirez pulls into a vacant lot to confront Allen. However, the two get caught in a large gunfight between gangs, the Russian Mob and Sal Maroni's gang. Maroni's men are gunned down and Maroni takes refuge behind Allen and Ramirez's patrol car, which the Russian destroys with a rocket launcher. Ramirez and Maroni manage to get clear in time, while Batman rescues Allen and takes out the Russian and his men. Maroni then threatens to kill Ramirez, but he is dispatched by Batman. Batman recognizes Allen and Ramirez as Gordon's hand-picked officers and remarks that Gordon is a good judge of character, then disappears.

Voice cast

- Kevin Conroy as Bruce Wayne / Batman
- Jim Meskimen as James Gordon
- Ana Ortiz as Anna Ramirez
- Corey Burton as Yuri Dimitrov
- Gary Dourdan as Crispus Allen
- Jason Marsden as Doctor
- Scott Menville as Cop
- Pat Musick as News Anchor
- Rob Paulsen as Sal Maroni
- Andrea Romano as Dispatcher

=== Field Test (Bee Train) ===
Field Test was written by Jordan Goldberg and animated by Bee Train.

An accident involving a new WayneCom satellite's gyroscopic electromagnetic guidance system gives Lucius Fox an idea to create a device with the satellite's gyro with an advanced sound sensor that will electromagnetically deflect small-arms fire. Bruce Wayne takes the device and attends a charity golf tournament held by land developer Ronald Marshall, with whom he discusses the mysterious death of a community activist named Teresa Williams, who had opposed some of Marshall's plans. During the tournament, Wayne secretly takes Marshall's PDA device. Later that night as Batman, he hijacks a boat owned by Sal Maroni and drives it alongside a boat owned by the Russian Mob's leader, the Russian, and proceeds to attack both gangs at once with assistance from his new device. He attempts to force a truce between the two gang leaders until he can get evidence against them and that Sal Maroni and the Russian can then argue who gets the top bunk at Blackgate Penitentiary. The discussion is disrupted when one of Maroni's men fires at him. The bullet deflects and instead hits one of the Russian's men. Distressed, Batman takes the injured man to the hospital. Later, he returns the device to Fox, stating: "... It works too well: I'm willing to put my life on the line to do what I have to. But it has to be mine, no one else's."

Voice cast

- Kevin Conroy as Bruce Wayne / Batman
- Corey Burton as Yuri Dimitrov, Ronald Marshall
- Will Friedle as Anton
- George Newbern as Guido
- Rob Paulsen as Sal Maroni
- Kevin Michael Richardson as Lucius Fox

=== In Darkness Dwells (Madhouse) ===
In Darkness Dwells, was written by David S. Goyer (who also wrote for all three films) and animated by Madhouse.

The police respond to a riot in a cathedral where Cardinal O'Fallon was giving a sermon. According to eyewitness testimony, O'Fallon was abducted by a large monster and taken into the crypts below the cathedral. Lieutenant Gordon, Crispus Allen and Anna Ramirez investigate. Gordon has a brief conversation with Batman, who agrees with Gordon's theory that the Scarecrow's fear toxin is behind the riot, as the doctor has been at large since the riot at the Narrows. Batman gives Gordon an earpiece that will allow them to stay in contact and descends below ground, trying to find O'Fallon and his abductor. A homeless man living in an abandoned subway station identifies the abductor as Killer Croc. Batman and Gordon briefly discuss the villain's past, but are cut off when Croc ambushes Batman. During the fight, Batman discovers Croc is under the influence of the Scarecrow's fear toxin. Batman defeats him, but not before sustaining a bite that transfers some of the toxin to him. He then finds O'Fallon being put on trial and sentenced to death by the Scarecrow (who is unhappy with O'Fallon's efforts to help the homeless). Batman leaps in to defend O'Fallon. Using the methane already present in the room, he sparks an explosion that destroys several water pipes, flooding the area and allowing him to escape with O'Fallon. While the Scarecrow escapes, Gordon appears in a helicopter to retrieve O'Fallon. Gordon offers to help Batman, but Batman refuses, saying: "Maybe next time."

Voice cast

- Kevin Conroy as Bruce Wayne / Batman
- Gary Dourdan as Crispus Allen
- Jim Meskimen as James Gordon
- Ana Ortiz as Anna Ramirez
- Corey Burton as Dr. Jonathan Crane / The Scarecrow
- Will Friedle as Cultist
- Brian George as O'Fallon
- George Newbern as Man
- Rob Paulsen as Mole Man

=== Working Through Pain (Studio 4°C) ===
Working Through Pain was written by Brian Azzarello and animated by Studio 4°C.

Taking place after In Darkness Dwells, Batman is shot in the stomach by a man hallucinating him as a bat-like monster in the sewers of Gotham (possibly due to being under the influence of the Scarecrow's fear toxin). Severely injured, Batman cauterizes the wound and desperately struggles to get out from underground, reflecting on his experiences with managing pain as he does before the events. First, he remembers volunteering with a relief effort and assisting a doctor in performing surgery without anesthesia. Next, he reflects on the lessons he learned from a woman named Cassandra. Over several months, she teaches him to minimize his pain to the point where he can control it, sleeping on a bed of needles or standing on hot coals without reacting. One night, several young men appear to harass Cassandra, who takes their blows without seeming to feel them. Bruce steps in to defend her, not only demonstrating his ability to withstand their attacks, but defeating them all with his martial arts skills. Cassandra then tells him to leave, saying that he has learned what he came to learn. She then comments on how Bruce's pain was beyond her or possibly even his ability to handle, but how it also appeared to be leading him down a path he desired. Back in the present, Batman ends up in a gutter where he discovers a cache of guns buried in the garbage. Alfred then arrives to assist him and tells Batman to reach out his hand so he can pull him out of the gutter but Batman, whose arms are full of guns, replies that he cannot.

Voice cast

- Kevin Conroy as Bruce Wayne / Batman
- David McCallum as Alfred Pennyworth
- Will Friedle as Youth 1
- Brian George as Arman, Scruffy Man
- Jason Marsden as Youth 2
- Parminder Nagra as Cassandra
- George Newbern as Youth 3
- Rob Paulsen as Youth 4
- Kevin Michael Richardson as Avery, Wounded Man
- Hynden Walch as Young Cassandra

=== Deadshot (Madhouse) ===
Deadshot was written by Alan Burnett and animated by Madhouse.

Bruce Wayne has a flashback to the murder of his parents. In his penthouse, he examines the firearms he took from the underground tunnel's gutter (during the events of Working Through Pain) which he intends to turn in to the police. Wayne admits to Alfred that even though he vowed never to use them in the memory of his parents, he can still understand the temptation to use one. Meanwhile, in another city, a prodigious assassin known as Deadshot carries out an assassination on Mayor Manning with a spectacularly difficult shot from a moving ferris wheel miles away from the man and returns to his tropical base. There, one of his associates hires him to carry out a hit in Gotham. It is revealed that the Russian has put out a hit on Lieutenant Gordon and Batman is called in to protect him. Batman gives Crispus Allen Ronald Marshall's handheld PDA device (which he stole as Bruce Wayne in Field Test), containing a link to encrypted e-mails proving that Ronald Marshall hired Deadshot in the past. He then follows Gordon's motorcade, with Alfred providing satellite-imagery assistance using the new WayneCom satellites. Deadshot attempts to shoot Gordon from a moving train, but Batman deflects the bullet. Deadshot then gleefully reveals that Batman was his real target the entire time and that the threat against Gordon was merely a ruse to draw him out. He opens fire as the train enters a tunnel and as Batman attempts to charge at Deadshot, he gets shot and falls off the train. Deadshot advances to where he saw Batman fall while gloating about shooting Batman, but is suddenly ambushed and disarmed from behind by Batman. Now terrified, Deadshot confesses that he was hired by the Russians to kill Batman and tries to talk Batman out of killing him since he was "only doing his job." Infuriated with Deadshot's cowardice, Batman knocks him out and Deadshot and Ronald Marshall are later arrested afterwards. Later, Wayne confides to Alfred about how similar the fight in the tunnel seemed to the night his parents were murdered and comments that "I've been trying to stop those two bullets all my life." He expresses discouragement and Alfred agrees, but then adds that he thinks Bruce has a higher purpose. The film ends with Bruce looking up at the sky and seeing the Bat-Signal.

Voice cast

- Kevin Conroy as Bruce Wayne / Batman

- Hynden Walch as Young Bruce Wayne, Female Campaign Worker

- Gary Dourdan as Crispus Allen
- Jim Meskimen as James Gordon, Floyd Lawton / Deadshot
- David McCallum as Alfred Pennyworth
- Jason Marsden as Thomas Wayne, Doctor
- Pat Musick as News Anchor
- Kevin Michael Richardson as Bulky Man
- Andrea Romano as Martha Wayne

== Soundtrack ==
Batman: Gotham Knight – soundtrack from the DC Universe animated original movie

Film score by Christopher Drake, Robert J. Kral, and Kevin Manthei
- Released: July 29, 2008
- Length: 63:10
- Label: La La Land Records

The soundtrack for Batman: Gotham Knight was released on July 29, 2008, by La La Land Records. The music for Gotham Knight, while being an original score, contains samples of earlier and notable Batman themes from past media. For example, in "Crossfire", when Batman saves Crispus Allen from an explosion by launching him onto a rooftop, his appearance (for the first time in the short) is marked by the distinctive choral Batman theme introduced in Danny Elfman's 1989 score to the Batman 1989 film. The track list is as follows.

Batman: Gotham Knight – Soundtrack from the DC Universe Animated Original Movie
No.	Title	Music Composed by	Length
1.	"Main Titles/Intro/Interlude/Punk Skater/Trouble At The Dock" (from Have I Got a Story for You)	Christopher Drake	2:28
2.	"Living Shadow/Living Shadow Finale" (from Have I Got a Story for You)	Christopher Drake	1:45
3.	"Skater Girl / Trouble In the City" (from Have I Got a Story for You)	Christopher Drake	0:50
4.	"Batmonster Appears/Batmonster Do-Over/Batmonster Finale" (from Have I Got a Story for You)	Christopher Drake	2:18
5.	"Rooftop Robbery/Robobat" (from Have I Got a Story for You)	Christopher Drake	1:44
6.	"Have I Got A Story For You Finale" (from Have I Got a Story for You)	Christopher Drake	1:35
7.	"Crossfire" (from Crossfire)	Kevin Manthei	4:49
8.	"Inferno" (from Crossfire)	Kevin Manthei	5:48
9.	"New Device" (from Field Test)	Robert J. Kral	1:22
10.	"Trigger A Device/As Good As Your Drive" (from Field Test)	Robert J. Kral	1:10
11.	"A Russian in His Grave/It Works Too Well" (from Field Test)	Robert J. Kral	3:53
12.	"In Darkness Dwells Intro" (from In Darkness Dwells)	Christopher Drake	1:00
13.	"Gordon's Cannibal/Ghost Station" (from In Darkness Dwells)	Christopher Drake	3:00
14.	"Epidermolytic Hyperkeratosis" (from In Darkness Dwells)	Christopher Drake	0:43
15.	"Killer Croc/Hallucinations/Scarecrow Interrupted" (from In Darkness Dwells)	Christopher Drake	3:19
16.	"Escape and End" (from In Darkness Dwells)	Christopher Drake	1:45
17.	"Working Through Pain/The Fall" (from Working Through Pain)	Kevin Manthei	1:46
18.	"Bazaar" (from Working Through Pain)	Kevin Manthei	0:26
19.	"There is Another/Training" (from Working Through Pain)	Kevin Manthei	2:46
20.	"Rejected and Despised" (from Working Through Pain)	Kevin Manthei	1:30
21.	"Painless Fight/I Can't" (from Working Through Pain)	Kevin Manthei	3:23
22.	"Parents Killed" (from Deadshot)	Robert J. Kral	0:54
23.	"Gun Attraction/Park Killing" (from Deadshot)	Robert J. Kral	1:26
24.	"Gordon/Batman/The Train" (from Deadshot)	Robert J. Kral	6:14
25.	"His Life's Quest" (from Deadshot)	Robert J. Kral	0:56
26.	"End Credits Suite"	Christopher Drake, Robert J. Kral, Kevin Manthei	5:02
Total length:			63:10

== International release and distribution ==
The film is rated PG-13 by the MPAA for "stylized violence, including some bloody images", and is the first animated Batman movie to be rated as such. While Superman: Doomsday and Justice League: The New Frontier have been released in the United Kingdom with a 12 rating, Batman: Gotham Knight was instead released with a 15 rating for "images of bloody violence and injury". The film had its television premiere on Cartoon Network on October 4, 2008, with a TV-14-V rating and an exclusive parental warning after each commercial break, with a few of the more graphic scenes cut. Over a decade later, it once again aired on the network on its nighttime programming block Adult Swim's Toonami block on August 22, 2020, in partnership with DC FanDome.

== Reception ==
As of October 2021, the film holds a 75% approval rating on Rotten Tomatoes, based on eight reviews with an average score of 6.8/10. Three months prior to the release, the first review for Batman: Gotham Knight appeared on The World's Finest. The review gave the film a generally favorable response, stating, "it's something new and entirely fresh for the Dark Knight and that alone is worth checking out if you're a DC Animation fan." The World's Finest also labeled its advice as "Recommended".

The film sold over 337,000 copies on DVD in the United States, and earned $9,753,273 from domestic home video sales.

== Home video ==
Batman: Gotham Knight was released on both single- and two-disc DVD editions, and in a double pack with the two-disc version of Batman Begins, as well as a Blu-ray version on July 8, 2008.

The special features on the single-disc edition contain an audio commentary of the film by Gregory Noveck, Dennis O'Neil and Kevin Conroy, as well as a sneak peek at the next movie of the DC Universe Animated Original Movies line: Wonder Woman. It is also including trailers and advertisements of The Dark Knight, Journey to the Center of the Earth, Lego Batman and Popeye the Sailor 1938–1940 (vol. 2). The Target edition also includes. The Blockbuster Inc. edition comes with a second disc with a digital copy of the Batman: Year One graphic novel (Batman #404–407).

The two-disc and Blu-ray editions of the film contain the aforementioned special features as well as a documentary titled Batman and Me: The Bob Kane Story, a featurette exploring Batman and the Gotham villains he faces titled A Mirror for the Bat, as well as four episodes from Batman: The Animated Series (see below), presented by Bruce Timm. Walmart and Target both released store exclusive versions of the single-disc edition of the film, both with different box covers/sleeves. Walmart's is a holographic cover/sleeve and Target's is a holographic cover/sleeve that can be hidden or shown. Certain Best Buy stores released a special edition for the two-disc edition which came in a Steelbook case and came with a mini-encyclopedia to the characters in the movie as well as Batman's weapons and vehicles and a coupon for $3.00 off concessions when the buyer sees The Dark Knight.

The four episodes from Batman: The Animated Series attached are:

- "Heart of Ice"
- "I Am the Night"
- "Legends of the Dark Knight"
- "Over the Edge"

The DVD was advertised as the "first animated Batman movie to be rated PG-13".

A DVD (Blu-ray Disc for PlayStation 3) of the movie was bundled with the collector's edition of Batman: Arkham City, which was released on October 18, 2011.

A Blu-ray and DVD combo was also released paired with Volume One of the Batman: Black and White comic book series in 2015. Special features include the documentary Batman and Me: The Bob Kane Story, the A Mirror for the Bat featurette and the audio commentary of the film by Gregory Noveck, Dennis O'Neil and Kevin Conroy.

Several DVD productions of the film had been released either separately or as a multiple feature disc alongside other direct-to video movies such as Batman: Under the Red Hood and Batman: Year One.

In 2019, it was released as part of the Batman 80th Anniversary DVD Collection, which came with 18 animated Batman films. It released alongside Batman: Year One, Batman: Under the Red Hood, Batman vs. Robin, Batman: Bad Blood, Son of Batman, Batman: The Dark Knight Returns, Batman: Assault on Arkham, Batman: The Killing Joke, Batman: Gotham by Gaslight, Batman Ninja, Batman: Return of the Caped Crusaders, Batman: Mask of the Phantasm, Batman: Mystery of the Batwoman, Superman/Batman: Public Enemies, and Superman/Batman: Apocalypse.

== Novelization ==
Comic book veteran Louise Simonson wrote a novel adaptation of the feature, published by Ace Books. It was released on May 27, 2008. ISBN 0-441-01613-8 ISBN 978-0441016136. Reviews for the novelization have been positive.

== References in Batman-related media ==
The Batsuit from Field Test appears as an unlockable alternate skin under the name Anime Batman Skin in Batman: Arkham Knight. It was originally unlockable by linking a WBPlay account to the game; in December 2020, it was made freely available. Its description in the game itself reads "Field-Tested".
