= Superman/Batman: Public Enemies =

2009 superhero film

- DVD cover
- Directed by: Sam Liu
- Written by: Stan Berkowitz
- Based on: Superman/Batman by: Jeph Loeb; Ed McGuinness
- Produced by: Bruce Timm; Alan Burnett; Michael Goguen; Bobbie Page; Sam Register; Benjamin Melniker; Michael Uslan
- Starring: Clancy Brown; Kevin Conroy; Tim Daly; Xander Berkeley; Corey Burton; Ricardo Chavira; Allison Mack; John C. McGinley; C. C. H. Pounder
- Edited by: Margaret Hou
- Music by: Christopher Drake
- Production companies: Warner Bros. Animation; Warner Premiere; DC Entertainment; Lotto Animation (Animation services)
- Distributed by: Warner Home Video
- Release date: September 29, 2009
- Running time: 67 minutes
- Country: United States
- Language: English

Superman/Batman: Public Enemies is a 2009 American animated superhero film based on the DC Comics story arc "Public Enemies" in the Superman/Batman comic book series, written by Jeph Loeb and drawn by Ed McGuinness, which focused on Superman and Batman teaming up to prevent a meteorite from striking Earth, and taking down Lex Luthor, who has been elected President of the United States. Directed by Sam Liu, it is the sixth film of the DC Universe Animated Original Movies. The film received generally positive reviews upon release. Additionally, Tim Daly, Kevin Conroy, Clancy Brown, and CCH Pounder reprise their respective roles from the DC Animated Universe as Superman, Batman, Lex Luthor, and Amanda Waller.

The film was released by Warner Bros. Animation on September 29, 2009.

== Plot ==
Lex Luthor is elected President during a severe nationwide economic depression. Under his leadership, the economy begins to thrive, and he assembles a group of government-employed superheroes consisting of Captain Atom, Katana, Black Lightning, Power Girl, Starfire, and Major Force. Despite Power Girl's enthusiasm about the peace and stability and Atom's loyalty to the government, Superman and Batman maintain their distrust toward Luthor.

The United States government discovers a massive Kryptonite meteor hurtling toward Earth. Instead of asking superheroes for aid, Luthor decides to destroy it with nuclear missiles. Luthor arranges a meeting with Superman in Gotham City under the pretense of a truce, only to result in a battle with the hired Metallo against Superman and Batman, in which Metallo manages to injure them both before an unknown assailant kills him. On national television, Luthor pins Metallo's murder on Superman, using altered footage of their battle to implicate him as well as a baseless claim that Kryptonite radiation can affect Superman's judgment, then places a billion-dollar bounty on Superman.

Batman and Superman break into S.T.A.R. Labs seeking information on the meteor, and find Metallo's remains; they realize that a radioactive energy blast killed him, and it was made to look like Superman's heat vision. An army of villains looking to collect the bounty attacks them. Superman and Batman easily overpower most of the villains while Captain Atom defeats the rest with a giant energy blast. All of Luthor's superhero team except Power Girl, whose loyalties are divided, attempt to capture the heroic duo until Superman creates a twister using his super-speed, and the two heroes escape with Power Girl.

In Metropolis, Power Girl admits that she does not believe Superman killed Metallo and dislikes Luthor. Luthor's superheroes catch up and the fight begins anew with Power Girl aiding Batman and Superman until Batman deduces that Major Force killed Metallo under Luthor's orders and goads him into admitting it in front of everyone. When Major Force snaps and tries to kill him, an angry Power Girl punches him hard enough to rupture his containment suit, releasing his radiation. Captain Atom absorbs the energy, disintegrating Major Force and leaving him comatose.

Meanwhile, the missiles fail due to the meteor's radiation destroying them before impact. Amanda Waller discovers that Luthor has secretly been taking a serum composed of a strength-enhancing steroid and liquid Kryptonite. Luthor then informs Waller that he will let the meteor hit Earth as he plans to rebuild society in his image, becoming Earth's single leader. Batman and Superman battle Captain Marvel and Hawkman before breaking into Luthor's base of operations to retrieve data on the meteor. Luthor refuses to relinquish the data, going so far as to erase it from the lab computers, but Waller gives them a copy. Batman, Superman, and Power Girl head to Tokyo to deliver the data to Toyman, who has already built a rocket-propelled spacecraft to stop the meteor. Waller and the military then attempt to arrest Luthor, but he injects himself with more Kryptonite steroids and dons a power suit equipped with Kryptonite weaponry. After escaping Waller and the military, Luthor follows Superman and Batman overseas, intending to kill Superman himself.

After Batman and Superman arrive at Toyman's lab, he shows them the spacecraft, which resembles a giant, robot composite version of Superman and Batman, and with the data creates reinforcements so that it will not explode before impact. However, Luthor arrives and neutralizes Power Girl, Superman, and Batman, and disables the rocket's remote guidance systems so that it will not take off by itself. With no other choice left, Batman decides to fly the rocket himself despite Superman's protests. Though initially faring poorly, Superman eventually disables Luthor's suit, and he is apprehended by Captain Atom and his team. Batman successfully destroys the meteor and returns to Earth in an escape pod.

With the truth of Metallo's death now public knowledge, Superman is cleared of murder charges, while Luthor is arrested and taken to face trial and impeachment for his crimes. Batman returns to Gotham while the Daily Planet's star journalist, Lois Lane, arrives and embraces Superman.

== Cast ==
- Tim Daly as Kal-El / Clark Kent / Superman
- Kevin Conroy as Bruce Wayne / Batman
- Clancy Brown as Lex Luthor
- Xander Berkeley as Captain Atom
- Corey Burton as Captain Marvel
- Ricardo Chavira as Major Force
- Allison Mack as Power Girl
- John C. McGinley as Metallo
- CCH Pounder as Amanda Waller
- LeVar Burton as Black Lightning
- Calvin Tran as Hiro Okamura / Toyman
- Mark Jonathan Davis as Newscaster
- Brian George as Gorilla Grodd
- Alan Oppenheimer as Alfred Pennyworth
- Bruce Timm as Mongul

== Soundtrack ==
Superman/Batman: Public Enemies (Soundtrack from the DC Universe Animated Original Movie)

Film score (Digital download) by Christopher Drake
- Released: September 29, 2009
- Length: 58:02
- Label: New Line Records

Superman/Batman: Public Enemies (Soundtrack from the DC Universe Animated Original Movie)
No.	Title	Length
1.	"Markets Crash"	1:32
2.	"Main Title"	2:27
3.	"Freeway Chase"	1:15
4.	"Admit Something"	1:40
5.	"Metallo"	4:51
6.	"High Voltage"	0:51
7.	"Framed"	1:27
8.	"Luthor talks to Power Girl"	0:55
9.	"S.T.A.R. Labs/ Banshee & The Cold Crew / Mongul, Grundy, Grodd"	5:57
10.	"Bounty Hunters"	1:58
11.	"No Surrender"	2:02
12.	"Tornado Recovery"	0:16
13.	"Trust Your Instincts"	4:05
14.	"The Corps Fights Sinestro"	2:48
15.	"Missile Launch"	1:45
16.	"Luthor’s Fix"	0:23
17.	"Shazam!"	3:05
18.	"Luthor Shoots Up"	1:17
19.	"Heroes In Disguise"	3:11
20.	"Toyman"	2:13
21.	"Blast Off"	4:02
22.	"Ultimate Sacrifice"	3:06
23.	"A Hero’s Return"	2:56
24.	"End Credits"	4:00
Total length:		58:02

== Reception ==
IGN reviewed both the standard and Blu-ray versions of the movie positively, awarding an 8.0 rating. This surpassed IGN's review of Superman: Doomsday, Batman: Gotham Knight, and Green Lantern: First Flight. The review score matched that of Justice League: The New Frontier.

At the DVD sales chart, Superman/Batman: Public Enemies opened at #5, selling 197,626 in the first week for revenue of $3,222,460. As of today, 527,482 units have been sold translating to $7,911,279 in revenue (This does not include rentals/Blu-ray sales). This makes Public Enemies the second highest selling DVD only behind Superman: Doomsday and the third most profitable of the ten movies in the DC Universe Animated Original Movies line-up. The film has currently earned a total of $11,037,595 from domestic home video sales.

== Home media ==
Superman/Batman: Public Enemies was released on standard DVD in single and double disc editions, along with a high definition Blu-ray release, on September 29, 2009. Special features for the double disc edition include an inside look of Wonder Woman, Batman: Gotham Knight, Justice League: The New Frontier, and Green Lantern: First Flight, DC Comics' 2009 crossover event Blackest Night, two production featurettes, a sneak peek of Justice League: Crisis on Two Earths, trailers of Green Lantern: First Flight, Fringe, and Batman: Arkham Asylum, digital copy download, and two episodes of Superman: The Animated Series picked by Bruce Timm. The Blu-ray edition has all the features of the double disc standard definition release including three additional Justice League episodes selected by Timm.

The good performance of the Superman/Batman: Public Enemies release has led Warner Premiere and DC Universe to release a sequel, Superman/Batman: Apocalypse, based on the Superman/Batman comic storyline "The Supergirl from Krypton". It was released on September 28, 2010.
