= Batman: Knightfall (film) =

Animated superhero film trilogy

- Trilogy logo
- Directed by: Jeff Wamester
- Written by: Jeremy Adams (Part 1); Jim Krieg (Part 2)
- Based on: Characters from DC; Batman: Knightfall by; Doug Moench; Chuck Dixon; Alan Grant; Dennis O'Neil; Peter David; Jo Duffy; Jim Aparo; Graham Nolan; Norm Breyfogle; Jim Balent
- Produced by: Jim Krieg; Kimberly S. Moreau
- Starring: Anson Mount; Michael Mando; Pablo Schreiber
- Music by: Eric V. Hachikian; John Jennings Boyd
- Production companies: Warner Bros. Animation; DC Entertainment
- Distributed by: Warner Bros. Home Entertainment
- Release dates: June 23, 2026 (Annecy; Part 1); August 25, 2026 (Part 1); December 15, 2026 ( Part 2); 2027 (Part 3)
- Running time: 79 minutes (Part 1); 76 minutes (Part 2)
- Country: United States
- Language: English

Batman: Knightfall is an American adult animated superhero film trilogy featuring Batman, and based on the DC Comics story arc Batman: Knightfall (1993–1994) itself consisting of three storylines. The films were directed by Jeff Wamester from scripts written by Jeremy Adams and Jim Krieg and stars Anson Mount, Michael Mando and Pablo Schreiber. They are installments of the DC Universe Animated Original Movies series.

The first installment, Batman: Knightfall – Part 1: Knightfall, details a terrorist campaign launched against Gotham City by Bane, an escaped convict from a Caribbean prison. After Bane orchestrates a mass breakout at Arkham Asylum, an increasingly exhausted Batman must personally apprehend his freed rogues' gallery before facing Bane in a confrontation. It premiered at the 2026 Annecy International Animation Film Festival, and was released digitally on August 25, 2026.

== Plot ==
=== Part 1: Knightfall ===
In Gotham City, Azrael slaughters members of the Kobra Cult for human traffickings, but Batman intervenes at the last moment to save a sole survivor from his lethal wrath. Following a duel with Batman, Azrael snaps out of his murderous rage when a truck fatally strikes the trafficker, revealing his split personality. Revealing his true identity as Jean-Paul Valley, he begs Batman for help.

Years earlier, on the corrupt Caribbean island nation of Santa Prisca, a young boy and his mother were forced to serve out his absentee father's term at the brutal Peña Duro Prison. Under his mother's intense indoctrination, the boy learns to despise weakness and educates himself assiduously. Inside the prison walls, a ragged issue of Gotham Today changed his fate. Seeing Thomas Wayne’s son, Bruce—a boy his own age—he becomes consumed by jealousy: he wants to conquer Gotham City and prove his supremacy over the elite class the Waynes embody. Following his mother's death, the boy kills a pedophilic janitor while defending himself, and violently resists the prison guards and warden who attempt to restrain him. Branded an abomination, he is cast into a subterranean pit to drown. Instead, he survives—forging his body, feeding on vermin, and descending into a feral state through years of brutal isolation. After reaching adulthood, his peak physical condition allows him to survive experiments with Venom, a volatile super-steroid, though he loses what remains of his sanity to the drug. Armed with superhuman strength, he slaughters the guards and warden before the terrified doctor, escaping the facility to the inmates' awe and the name Bane.

In the present, Dr. Shondra Kinsolving questions Bruce Wayne about the tragedies that have followed him. Her inquiry covers the murders of his parents, his estrangement from Dick Grayson, and the death of Jason Todd. Citing their history as Robin, she warns the secretly masked Batman to seek help before his new protégé, Tim Drake, suffers the same fate, urging Bruce to admit that he also needs a way out. Simultaneously, the plot escalates as Bane breaches Arkham Asylum and detonates an explosion that frees the inmates, including Batman's rogues' gallery.

Two days later, Batman and Robin confront the escaped Mad Hatter at a captive's estate. Though the duo successfully rescues the hostages—despite an exhausted Batman slowing down during the fight—Batman still reprimands Robin for disobeying orders and leaving the Batmobile. During his recovery and training in the Batcave, Jean-Paul confesses to Alfred Pennyworth that his violent impulses stem from the Order of St. Dumas's lifelong brainwashing of his family. After returning to the underground headquarters, Batman orders Robin to investigate the asylum's explosion and heads back out immediately, ignoring Alfred and Tim's concerns about his crippling fatigue.

At the Bates School for Women, Batman saves hostages and one of Commissioner Gordon's detectives, Renee Montoya, who entered against orders, from serial killer Victor Zsasz. Under intense strain, Batman pummels Zsasz nearly to death before Montoya stops him, causing her to question his status as a hero. Over time, Batman is increasingly debilitated while capturing his foes. After hallucinating Jason due to Scarecrow's fear gas, he reaches out to Shondra but is called away by the Bat-Signal. At the Crowning Clocktower, Batman confronts the Riddler, whom Bane forcibly injected with Venom to attack and completely exhaust Batman. Riddler plants a bomb and flees, but Batman disposes of it. Gordon confronts Batman about his stress-induced breakdown, but Batman rejects the lifeline. Without the tools to stitch Bruce's wounds, Shondra reveals her secret metahuman healing ability after he falls asleep in her office, though the exertion leaves her somnolent.

After tracing the asylum's explosive residue to the Bertinelli Cartel, Robin and Jean-Paul confront its leader, Franco Bertinelli. They discover that before Arkham's destruction, Bane had ambushed the syndicate and seized their arsenal. However, when Franco's security detail opens fire, the sudden violence triggers Jean-Paul's deep-seated brainwashing, forcing him to retreat in a blind panic. While Robin investigates the stolen bombs, Bane ambushes him. Held captive, Robin discovers the depth of Bane's obsession with the Waynes as the juggernaut exploits Batman's secrets against him. Forged by his brutal imprisonment, Bane maintains that true strength is born from suffering. Rejecting Gotham's reliance on vigilantes, he aims to break Batman and purge the city through terror. Robin breaks free and narrowly escapes after being unable to defeat Bane. In a church, Jean-Paul confesses, but he hallucinates a priest and a Knights Templar who instruct him to embrace his destiny as Azrael.

When Bruce returns to the Batcave and learns of Tim's disobedience, he furiously fires him, completely ignoring Tim's warnings about Bane. He later attempts to apologize to Tim and Alfred but instead finds them unconscious and is confronted by Bane. Even with Shondra's healing, an exhausted Batman cannot withstand a Venom-fueled Bane, who relentlessly thrashes and mocks his target from the Wayne Manor down to the Batcave. Driven by frustration at Batman's defiance, Bane fractures his spine, choosing the torment of paraplegia over the mercy of death.

After bombing the Gotham City Police Department (GCPD) headquarters, Bane publicly humiliates Batman by throwing his incapacitated body from the roof. The act is broadcast live to the city—including Batman's allies—and witnessed firsthand by police and news crews as Bane declares that Gotham must now fend for itself. Detective Harvey Bullock subsequently warns Gordon that Bane's actions will plunge Gotham into chaos.

== Voice cast ==
=== Appearing in Part 1 ===
- Anson Mount as Bruce Wayne / Batman
- Michael Mando as Bane
  - Noah Mendes as young Bane
- Pablo Schreiber as Jean-Paul Valley / Azrael
- Jeff Bennett as Arnold Wesker / Ventriloquist and Scarface (credited), Vincent (uncredited)
- Luis Bermudez as Thomas Blake / Catman (credited), Doctor (uncredited), Guard (uncredited)
- Bruce Boxleitner as Commissioner Gordon
- Jessica Camacho as Renee Montoya
- Anthony Crivello as Franco Bertinelli, Priest, Prisoner
- David Dastmalchian as Edward Nygma / Riddler
- Jason Flemyng as Jervis Tetch / Mad Hatter (credited), Saint Dumas (uncredited)
- Jack Griffo as Tim Drake / Robin
- Jason Hightower as Riddler Henchman (credited), Behemoth (uncredited), Prisoner (uncredited)
- Adriana Isabel as Bane's mother
- Max Mittelman as Jason Todd / Robin (credited), Police Officer (uncredited)
- Andrew Morgado as Victor Zsasz (credited), Book Man (uncredited), Police Officer (uncredited)
- Bayardo de Murguia as the Peña Duro prison warden
- Toks Olagundoye as Shondra Kinsolving
- Stephen Oyoung as Chen
- Bill Rogers as Gino, Guard, Tony
- Simon Templeman as Alfred Pennyworth
- Mick Wingert as Harvey Bullock (credited), Prisoner (uncredited)

=== Appearing in Part 2 ===
- Mike Prater as Dick Grayson / Nightwing

== Production ==
In October 2025, during New York Comic Con, it was announced that a series of animated films based on the Batman three-part story arc "Knightfall" (1993–1994) was in development. The first installment, Batman: Knightfall – Part 1: Knightfall, is directed by Jeff Wamester from a screenplay written by Jeremy Adams, with Jim Krieg and Kimberly S. Moreau serving as producers, while Sam Register and Michael Uslan serve as executive producers. Warner Bros. Animation and DC Studios will produce the film, with Studio Mir providing the animation services. When production on the film started, supervising producer Rick Morales and his fellow crew members worked around the parameters that the film had to be rated as "PG-13" due to being a Batman film despite Morales' experience in Mortal Kombat Legends: Snow Blind (2022) "forming part of his DNA", so their first set of storyboards were based on that toned down level of violence until they showed them to the executives and they said that they could show a little bit more, to which a surprised Morales started asking his colleagues to push the limits to be a "little bit more" violent and crazy to earn an "R rating", like a scene that according to producer Jim Krieg, involved characters burning to death but it was originally offscreen, so they doubled down to show it more explicitly. At the premiere of Part 1: Knightfall in the 2026 Annecy International Animation Film Festival, the voice cast—which includes Anson Mount, who previously voiced Batman in Injustice, Michael Mando, and Pablo Schreiber—was unveiled. John Jennings Boyd & Eric V. Hachikian composed the music.

== Release ==
Part 1: Knightfall premiered at the 2026 Annecy International Animation Film Festival on June 23, 2026. The film was released digitally on August 25, while a physical release on 4K Ultra HD, Blu-ray, and DVD is set for September 8; Part 2: Knightquest is planned to release later on December 15, 2026, while Part 3 is expected to release in 2027.

The official trailer for Part 2: Knightquest was released on September 19, 2026, coinciding with Batman Day.

== Reception ==
Swara Ahmed of The Nerds of Color declared Part 1 as a "Superb Adaptation" of Knightfall, calling it the best animated Batman film since Mask of the Phantasm and one of the best overall Batman films.

Other reviews were also positive. Alex Zalben of Comic Book Club praised the adaptation for condensing the lengthy comic-book storyline while retaining its major narrative beats. Jeffrey Lyles of Lyles Movie Files called it a “fantastic adaptation” and praised its animation design and final act, awarding it 9.5 out of 10. Writing for Get Your Comic On, Neil Vagg gave the film five stars and praised the adaptation's changes and faithfulness to its source material.

Jessie Schedeen of IGN praised the film, saying "The first part of this animated trilogy succeeds in cutting through the fat and adapting the essential core of a classic Batman crossover. It paints a vivid psychological portrait of both Batman and his latest arch-nemesis."

Variety reported that Part 1: Knightfall received applause at its premiere at the Annecy International Animation Film Festival, noting its graphic violence and portrayal of an exhausted Batman. TheWrap described the film as a faithful adaptation of the comic storyline.

Daniel Kurland of Dread Central praised the film's portrayal of Bane and Pablo Schreiber's performance as Jean-Paul Valley, but criticised its occasional rushed pacing and felt that it told only part of a story.
