= Batman: Gotham by Gaslight =

2018 animated film directed by Sam Liu

- Promotional poster
- Directed by: Sam Liu
- Screenplay by: Jim Krieg
- Based on: Gotham by Gaslight by: Brian Augustyn; Mike Mignola Batman by Bob Kane and Bill Finger
- Produced by: Sam Liu
- Starring: Bruce Greenwood; Jennifer Carpenter
- Edited by: Christopher D. Lozinski
- Music by: Frederik Wiedmann
- Production companies: Warner Bros. Animation; DC Entertainment; The Answer Studio (Animation services)
- Distributed by: Warner Bros. Home Entertainment
- Release dates: January 12, 2018 (Newseum); January 23, 2018 (Digital Download); February 6, 2018 (Blu-ray)
- Running time: 78 minutes
- Country: United States
- Language: English

Batman: Gotham by Gaslight is a 2018 American adult animated superhero film produced by Warner Bros. Animation and distributed by Warner Bros. Home Entertainment, featuring an alternate version of the DC Comics character Batman. It is the 31st film of the DC Universe Animated Original Movies. It is directed and produced by Sam Liu and written by James Krieg, loosely based on the standalone graphic novel of the same name by Brian Augustyn and Mike Mignola.

The film was released for a world premiere screening at the Newseum in Washington, D.C. during the "DC in D.C." event on January 12, 2018, and then for digital download on January 23, 2018 before coming out on DVD and Blu-ray on February 6. Batman: Gotham by Gaslight was the last film to be released during the lifetime of Benjamin Melniker, a longtime DC film producer who died a month later at the age of 104.

== Plot ==
In Victorian-era Gotham City, Batman saves a wealthy couple from being robbed by three orphans (Dickie, Jason, and Timmy) and defeats their abusive handler, Big Bill Dust. At the same time, Ivy, an orphan turned exotic dancer and prostitute, becomes the newest victim of Jack the Ripper, the serial killer who preys on Gotham's poor and destitute women. Citizens of Gotham believe the Batman and Jack to be the same man. Selina Kyle, a famed local actress, berates Gotham Police Commissioner James Gordon and Chief of Police Harvey Bullock for their failure to stop the Ripper murders.

At the Monarch Theatre with his friend, District Attorney Harvey Dent, Bruce meets Selina and the two bond at the exclusive Dionysus Club. Bruce realizes that not only were the two of them raised by Sister Leslie, but that some of the murdered girls were orphans formerly under Leslie's care. Bruce realizes that the Ripper will target Leslie and rushes to save her but is too late. At the crime scene, Bruce finds a bloody Dionysus Club pin, meaning the Ripper has to be one of Gotham's wealthy. At Sister Leslie's funeral, Bruce is met by psychiatrist Hugo Strange, claiming he knows the killer and wants to meet with Batman. Bruce also is met by Marlene, a drunken old woman who claims she saw him sneaking around when Sister Leslie was killed.

At Arkham Asylum, the Ripper ambushes Strange and throws him to his own frenzied patients, who tear him apart. While in pursuit of the Ripper, Batman is himself chased by police, only to be saved by a costumed Selina. After seeing Batman is Bruce, she takes him to her home, where they spend the night.

After Marlene is found dead, Bruce is arrested, and Dent, jealous of Selina's affection, prosecutes him as the Ripper. Sentenced to Blackgate Penitentiary following the trial, Bruce is met by Selina, who urges him to reveal he is Batman to clear his name and help save the girls from Jack. When he refuses, she decides to tell Gordon herself. Bribing a guard to deliver a coded message to his manor, Bruce escapes after staging a prison fight.

Selina meets with Gordon at the Gotham City World's Fair and learns to her horror that he is the Ripper. While seeking Selina at Gordon's home, Batman learns this as well. Gordon injects Selina with a sleeping aid, but she remains conscious long enough to give Batman a signal using her blood on a searchlight. Batman arrives and fights Gordon into a Ferris wheel where Gordon, driven insane by his time in the Civil War, reveals his "holy work" is to rid Gotham from what he sees as human filth. The Ferris wheel lights on fire in the struggle and begins to collapse: Batman defeats Gordon, who chooses to commit suicide. Batman and Selina are saved by Alfred and the orphans, who are now Bruce Wayne's wards.

== Voice cast ==
- Bruce Greenwood as Bruce Wayne / Batman
- Jennifer Carpenter as Selina Kyle
- Anthony Stewart Head as Alfred Pennyworth
- Chris Cox as Father Callahan
- John DiMaggio as Police Chief Bullock, Big Bill Dust
- David Forseth as Cyrus Gold
- Grey Griffin as Sister Leslie Thompkins, Selina Kyle (singing voice), Jason Todd
- Bob Joles as Mayor Tolliver
- Yuri Lowenthal as Harvey Dent
- Lincoln Melcher as Dickie Grayson
- Scott Patterson as Commissioner James Gordon / Jack the Ripper
- William Salyers as Hugo Strange
- Tara Strong as Marlene Mahoney, Timmy Drake
- Bruce Timm as Arkham Radio Man
- Kari Wuhrer as Barbara Eileen-Gordon / Two-Face, Pamela "Ivy" Isley

== Influences ==
Producer Bruce Timm has pointed to the 1944 film The Lodger and Erik Larson's book The Devil in the White City as influences on the film. He also cited a dream sequence in a particular episode of the 1960s television show Gilligan's Island in which the characters of the show took on well-known roles from Victorian-era British fiction. "There was a Victorian one where the Professor was Sherlock Holmes and Skipper was Doctor Watson and Mary Anne was Eliza Doolittle and Gilligan himself was Jekyll and Hyde. So, this is kind of the same kind of idea. You take those characters that you know and you put them in different spots in this different world and see what happens. That was a lot of fun... ...It's a little glimpse into that Victorian Gotham and then expand that and put as many of Batman's stock players in it in roles you recognize... ...You know, who's gonna be Lestrade? And who's gonna be Watson? And who is gonna be Irene Adler?"

Writer Jim Kreig spoke of the influence of the Sherlock Holmes stories, both as written by Arthur Conan Doyle, and as written by others: "I grew up as a Holmes fan and my dad read it to me, and I read it to my kids. But I didn't want to get any of it wrong and I didn't want to leave any Sherlockian stone unturned. I made the Baker Street Irregulars into Robins. I tried to do as much as I could... ...There's actually a considerable amount of British literature that are about Sherlock Holmes versus Jack the Ripper... ...There are about 15 books. I maybe read five of them." He noted the 1965 film A Study in Terror as a favorite of his. Timm, Krieg, and director Sam Liu had discussed including the Sherlock Holmes character in the film adaptation, but eventually opted to pay homage to that character with references to aspects of the Holmes canon.

== Reception ==
=== Critical response ===
Julian Romano at MovieWeb gave the film a positive review, going so far as to say it "ranks among the best of the DC Animated Universe". He says the film surpasses Batman: The Killing Joke, doing a better job of adapting the source material, praising screenwriter Jim Krieg and director Sam Liu for their intelligent approach. He notes the R rating, and acknowledges that although the film is not suitable for younger audiences and features violence and coarse language it is not gratuitous.

Will Romine at Bleeding Cool gave the film 9/10.

Joshua Yehl at IGN gave the film 6.5/10.

Kayti Burt at Den of Geek gave the film 2.5/5, praising the voice cast, and describing it as "an R-rated whodunnit horror with a twist..." and that "[i]t's not as clever as it thinks it is, but it's clever enough."

On review aggregation website Rotten Tomatoes, the film has an approval rating of 75%, based on reviews from 12 critics, with an average rating of 6.6/10.

=== Sales figures ===
The film earned $1,119,861 from DVD sales and $3,550,660 from Blu-ray sales, bringing its total North American domestic home video earnings to $4,670,521.
