= Harvey Bullock (character) =

Fictional DC Comics character

- Harvey Bullock as depicted in The Other History of the DC Universe #4 (May 2021). Art by Giuseppe Camuncoli.

Publication information
- Publisher: DC Comics
- First appearance: As Lieutenant Bullock: Detective Comics #441 (June 1974); As Detective Harvey Bullock: Batman #361 (July 1983)
- Created by: As Lieutenant Bullock: Archie Goodwin (writer); Howard Chaykin (artist); As Detective Harvey Bullock: Doug Moench (writer); Don Newton (artist)

In-story information
- Full name: Harvey Bullock
- Species: Human
- Team affiliations: GCPD; Checkmate
- Supporting character of: Batman
- Abilities: Trained detective

Harvey Bullock (/ˈbʊlək/) is a fictional detective appearing in American comic books published by DC Comics, commonly in association with the superhero Batman. The character first appeared in Detective Comics #441 (June 1974) and was created by Archie Goodwin and Howard Chaykin. In animation, he appeared throughout the DC Animated Universe, voiced by Robert Costanzo. He debuted in live-action in 2014 on Fox's television series Gotham, portrayed by Donal Logue.

== Publication history ==
There is some ambiguity concerning the character's origins. Writer Doug Moench and artist Don Newton introduced Harvey Bullock in Batman #361 (July 1983) as a device to resolve the ongoing plotline with Gotham City's corrupt mayor Hamilton Hill, and subsequent Who's Who in the DC Universe entries acknowledged this as the new Bullock's first appearance. However, in later years Batman fans began pointing out that a "Lt. Bullock" appeared in three panels of Detective Comics #441 (1974), written by Archie Goodwin, pencilled by Howard Chaykin, and published almost a decade before. Moench admitted that he must have read this comic because he is an Archie Goodwin fan, but denied that Harvey Bullock is the same character. He argued that it is unlikely that he drew on Goodwin's Lt. Bullock even unconsciously, since there are discrepancies of both personality and continuity between his character and Goodwin's, and he distinctly remembers taking the name "Bullock" from guitarist Hiram Bullock. Archie Goodwin is legally Harvey Bullock's sole creator; Moench said he decided not to contest this because he did not want to make a case against Goodwin's widow Anne Goodwin, whom he considers a friend.

Following the conclusion of the Hamilton Hill storyline, Moench decided he enjoyed writing Harvey Bullock enough to keep him on as a supporting character, which necessitated some softening of his original characterization as a corrupt cop. Bullock was one of several Batman supporting cast members swept out of the Batman family of titles when Denny O'Neil became the Batman editor in 1986, but in 1987 writer Paul Kupperberg brought him into the Vigilante cast. Kupperberg recalled, "Harvey Bullock was a character very much in my wheelhouse, a wise-cracking loudmouth with a Brooklyn accent and a problem with authority, although he wasn't originally intended to be a permanent member of the Vigilante cast. He was brought in for a guest-shot, as a character to help Vigilante's handler, Harry Stein, grease the wheels in Gotham City for them on whatever case they were on. I had fun writing him, and the interaction between Harvey and Harry Stein, another slob with his own way of doing things, clicked. I don't think they were using him much, if at all, in the Batman books by then, so we got permission from the Bat-office to have the character on semi-permanent loan for Vigilante and its successor title, Checkmate."

== Fictional character biography ==
In continuity prior to Crisis on Infinite Earths, Bullock was a corrupt police detective under instructions from Gotham City mayor Hamilton Hill to sabotage Commissioner Gordon's career. Bullock forms a close bond with Robin, based initially on their mutual love of old movies. Subsequent to this, he is a Bishop in the spy organization Checkmate.

=== Post-Crisis ===
Following the continuity changes brought about by Crisis on Infinite Earths, Bullock is a controversial police officer in the Gotham City Police Department who is loyal to Jim Gordon. His colleagues in the Major Crimes Unit insist that he is a good cop, despite his reputation for taking bribes, using excessive force, and having ties to organized crime.

Several years later, Bullock is made detective. He again works closely with Gordon, as part of a small crew of people Gordon knows he can trust. This group includes Maggie Sawyer, Harvey Dent, and Detective Cohen as they try to bring down Sal Maroni. Though Gordon knows of and has recordings of Bullock's brutality against suspects, he brings him in because Bullock has never accepted bribes. Bullock and the group are joined by Crispus Allen, and together they take down a gathering of Gotham's "freaks", such as the Joker, Clayface, and Scarecrow. For a time, Bullock works with the international spy agency Checkmate.

Following an earthquake, Gotham City is shut down and closed off by the government in the incident known as No Man's Land. Bullock and several other officers willingly stay behind to assist Gordon. Bullock sticks by Gordon through the death of many fellow officers. In the end, efforts led by Lex Luthor re-open Gotham. Gordon, Bullock, Renee Montoya, and the remaining officers are given their jobs back. Bullock is promoted to lieutenant and becomes the shift commander of the GCPD's Major Crimes Unit.

In the "Officer Down" storyline, disgruntled former officer Jordan Rich attempts to kill Gordon. A vengeful Bullock reveals Rich's location to the Mafia, thereby indirectly killing the shooter. When evidence of this comes out, he resigns from the force. As part of DC's "One Year Later" storyline, Bullock returned to the GCPD.

== In other media ==
=== Television ===
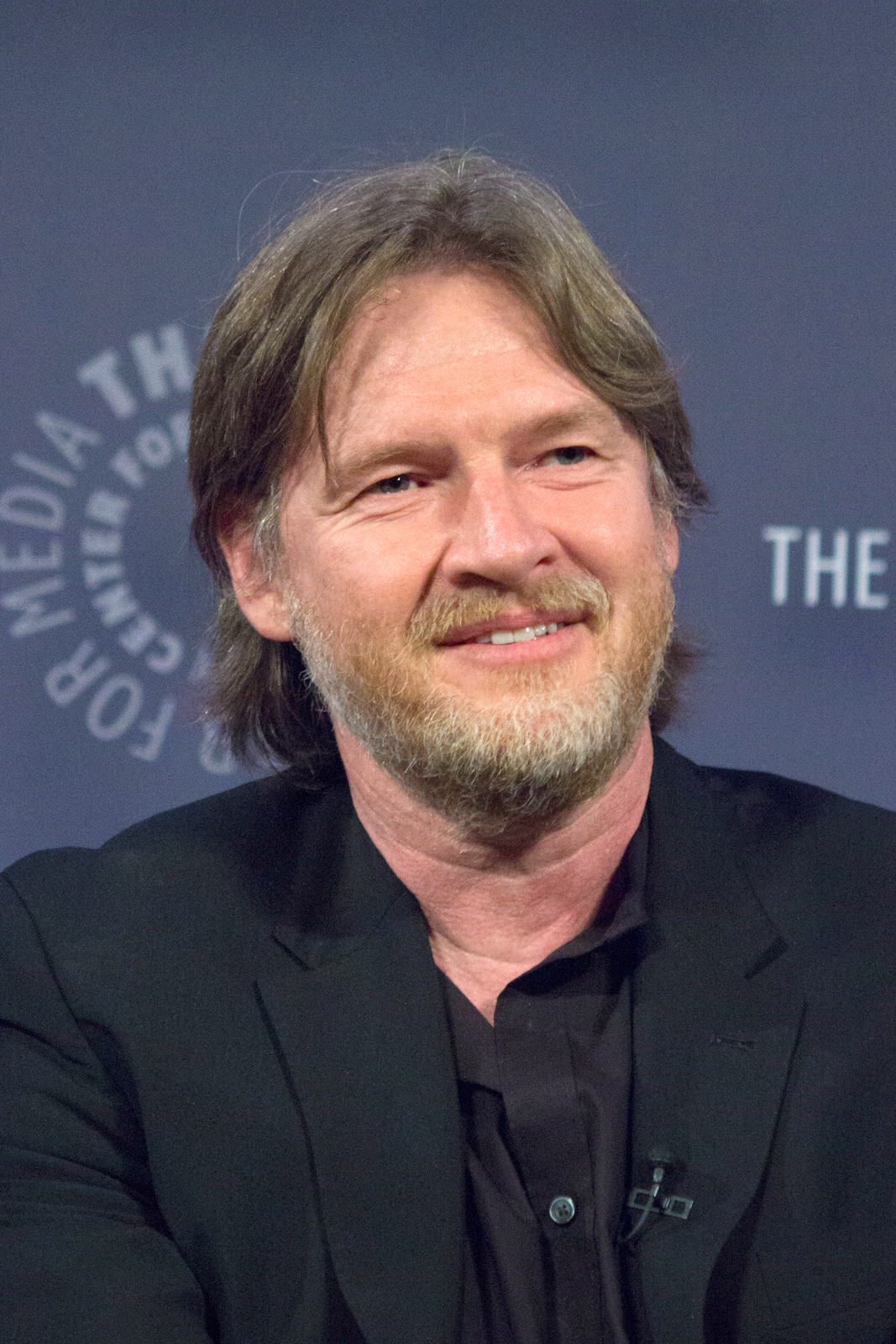
Donal Logue, who portrays Harvey Bullock in Gotham

- Harvey Bullock appears in series set in the DC Animated Universe (DCAU), voiced by Robert Costanzo. This version displays a penchant for doughnuts and coffee instead of drinking and smoking in line with police stereotypes. Additionally, he initially distrusts Batman before later developing a grudging respect for him and often uses dubious means to ensure that justice is served. Following his introduction in Batman: The Animated Series, Bullock appears in The New Batman Adventures, Superman: The Animated Series, and Static Shock.
- Harvey Bullock makes a non-speaking appearance in the Young Justice episode "Triptych".
- Harvey Bullock appears in Gotham, portrayed by Donal Logue. This version is Jim Gordon's partner who is willing to bend, sometimes break, the rules to get results done and has ties to organized crime bosses, such as Carmine Falcone, Fish Mooney, and Oswald Cobblepot, with who he trades police favors in exchange for information. In the second season, Bullock temporarily quits the GCPD, stops drinking, and becomes a bartender until the Maniax gang resurface, forcing him to return. He is later appointed acting captain of the GCPD in the second season finale and the third season until Gordon discovers his dealings with Cobblepot and takes Bullock's place in the fourth season.
- Harvey Bullock appears in Batman: Caped Crusader, voiced by John DiMaggio. This version starts off as a detective before being demoted to officer in season 2 following the death of Harvey Dent.

=== Film ===
- In Sam Hamm's original script for Batman Returns, Bullock was intended to appear as Commissioner Gordon's companion. However, he was removed from the script after Tim Burton signed on to direct.
- The DCAU incarnation of Harvey Bullock appears in Batman: Mask of the Phantasm, voiced again by Robert Costanzo.
- The DCAU incarnation of Harvey Bullock appears in Batman & Mr. Freeze: SubZero, voiced again by Robert Costanzo.
- The DCAU incarnation of Harvey Bullock appears in Batman: Mystery of the Batwoman, voiced again by Robert Costanzo.
- Harvey Bullock appears in Batman: The Killing Joke, voiced by Robin Atkin Downes.
- Harvey Bullock appears in Scooby-Doo! & Batman: The Brave and the Bold, voiced by Fred Tatasciore.
- A Victorian era-inspired alternate universe version of Harvey Bullock appears in Batman: Gotham by Gaslight, voiced by John DiMaggio.
- Harvey Bullock appears in Batman: Knightfall, voiced by Mick Wingert.

=== Video games ===
- Harvey Bullock makes an appearance in The Adventures of Batman & Robin; Robert Costanzo reprises his role in the Sega CD version.
- Harvey Bullock appears in Batman: Chaos in Gotham.
- Harvey Bullock appears in Batman: Dark Tomorrow, voiced by Danny Mastrogiorgio.
- Harvey Bullock appears as a non-playable character in DC Universe Online, voiced by Edwin Neal.
- Harvey Bullock appears in Batman: Arkham Origins, voiced again by Robert Costanzo.
- Harvey Bullock appears as a character summon in Scribblenauts Unmasked: A DC Comics Adventure.
- Harvey Bullock appears in Batman: The Enemy Within, voiced by Keith Szarabajka.
- Harvey Bullock appears as a NPC in Lego DC Super-Villains.
- Harvey Bullock appears in Lego Batman: Legacy of the Dark Knight.

=== Miscellaneous ===
- Harvey Bullock appears in the radio adaptation of Batman: Knightfall, voiced by Eric Meyers.
- Harvey Bullock appears in The Batman Adventures.
- Harvey Bullock appears in the Injustice: Gods Among Us: Year Two. This version is a member of Batman's Insurgency who is later killed by Mister Mxyzptlk.

Preceded by Sarah Essen Gordon	GCPD Major Crimes Unit Shift Commander; 2000–2001	Succeeded by Maggie Sawyer
