= DC Universe Animated Original Movies =

Film series

DC Universe Animated Original Movie
- Years: 2007–present

Miscellaneous
- Distributed by: Warner Bros. Home Entertainment (Note: Paramount Home Entertainment distributed Watchmen in international releases)
- Country: United States

The DC Universe Animated Original Movies (DCUAOM; also known as DC Universe Original Movies or DC Universe Movies or DC Animated Movies) are a series of American direct-to-video superhero animated films based on DC Comics characters and stories. From 2007 to 2022, films were produced primarily by Warner Bros. Animation but subsequently fell under DC Studios. Many films are stand-alone projects that are either adaptations of popular works or original stories.

From 2013 to 2024, the DC Animated Movie Universe was a subset of this series. The first story arc featured several films that took place in a shared universe, influenced predominantly by "The New 52". Following the first arc's conclusion with Justice League Dark: Apokolips War (2020), the "Tomorrowverse" series was launched beginning with Superman: Man of Tomorrow that same year and ended with a trilogy, Justice League: Crisis on Infinite Earths (2024). As of 2024, the DCUAOM line released 60 films that made a total of $257 million in sales in the United States and Canada, an average of $5.4 million per film.

== Premise ==
Original logo from 2007 to 2012

Unlike earlier animated DC films (most of which also involved Bruce Timm and were part of the DC Animated Universe), the films in this line are aimed at a more adult audience, often containing profane language, stronger violence, sexual scenes, and more mature themes. The art styles for the films are also generally more realistically proportionate. The majority of the films are rated PG-13 by the MPAA except All-Star Superman and Green Lantern: Emerald Knights, which are rated PG, and Batman: The Killing Joke, Justice League Dark, Batman: Gotham by Gaslight, Suicide Squad: Hell to Pay, Justice League Dark: Apokolips War, Batman: Soul of the Dragon, Batman: The Long Halloween, Part Two, Injustice, Justice League: Warworld, Watchmen, and Batman: Knightfall which are rated R. Many of the films are adapted from stories originally featured in DC print comics and graphic novels. As of 2026, 60 feature films and fourteen short films have been released.

In terms of continuity, the films are usually stand-alone, with exceptions being Superman/Batman: Public Enemies and its sequel Superman/Batman: Apocalypse, Justice League: Crisis on Two Earths and its sequel Justice League: Doom, the DC Animated Movie Universe and its "Tomorrowverse" arc.

From 2007 to 2015, most of the films were voice-directed by Andrea Romano, the last one being Justice League: Gods and Monsters. Then from 2016 to 2024, duties were handed to Wes Gleason, starting with Batman: Bad Blood up until the Justice League: Crisis on Infinite Earths trilogy.

The films are generally released direct-to-video, but Batman: The Killing Joke, Batman and Harley Quinn, The Death of Superman and Reign of the Supermen were also given limited releases in theaters.

== Released films ==
No	Title	Release date	Continuity	Adapted from
1	Superman: Doomsday	September 21, 2007	Standalone	"The Death of Superman"
2	Justice League: The New Frontier	February 26, 2008	Standalone	DC: The New Frontier
3	Batman: Gotham Knight	July 8, 2008	The Dark Knight trilogy	Batman: "The Batman Nobody Knows"
4	Wonder Woman	March 3, 2009	Standalone	Wonder Woman: "Gods and Mortals"
5	Green Lantern: First Flight	July 28, 2009	Standalone	Green Lantern
6	Superman/Batman: Public Enemies	September 29, 2009	Superman/Batman	Superman/Batman: "Public Enemies"
7	Justice League: Crisis on Two Earths	February 23, 2010	Crisis on Two Earths / Doom	"Crisis on Earth-Three!" / JLA: Earth 2
8	Batman: Under the Red Hood	July 7, 2010	Standalone	Batman: "A Death in the Family" / "Under the Hood"
9	Superman/Batman: Apocalypse	September 28, 2010	Superman/Batman	Superman/Batman: "The Supergirl from Krypton"
10	All-Star Superman	February 22, 2011	Standalone	All-Star Superman
11	Green Lantern: Emerald Knights	July 7, 2011	Standalone	"New Blood" / "What Price Honor?" / "Mogo Doesn't Socialize" / "Tygers"
12	Batman: Year One	October 18, 2011	Year One / The Dark Knight Returns (duology)	"Batman: Year One"
13	Justice League: Doom	February 28, 2012	Crisis on Two Earths / Doom	JLA: "Tower of Babel"
14	Superman vs. The Elite	June 12, 2012	Standalone	"What's So Funny About Truth, Justice & the American Way?"
15	Batman: The Dark Knight Returns – Part 1	September 25, 2012	Year One / The Dark Knight Returns (duology)	The Dark Knight Returns
16	Batman: The Dark Knight Returns – Part 2	January 29, 2013	Year One / The Dark Knight Returns (duology)	The Dark Knight Returns
17	Superman: Unbound	May 7, 2013	Standalone	Superman: "Brainiac"
18	Justice League: The Flashpoint Paradox	July 30, 2013	DCAMU	"Flashpoint"
19	Justice League: War	February 4, 2014	DCAMU	"Justice League: Origin"
20	Son of Batman	May 6, 2014	DCAMU	Batman: "Batman and Son"
21	Batman: Assault on Arkham	July 29, 2014	Arkhamverse	
22	Justice League: Throne of Atlantis	January 13, 2015	DCAMU	"Throne of Atlantis"
23	Batman vs. Robin	April 7, 2015	DCAMU	Batman: "Night of the Owls"; Batman and Robin: "Born to Kill"; Detective Comics: "Faces of Death"
24	Justice League: Gods and Monsters	July 28, 2015	Standalone	
25	Batman: Bad Blood	January 20, 2016	DCAMU	Batman and Robin / Batman, Inc.
26	Justice League vs. Teen Titans	March 29, 2016	DCAMU	
27	Batman: The Killing Joke	July 22, 2016	Standalone	Batman: The Killing Joke
28	Justice League Dark	January 24, 2017	DCAMU	
29	Teen Titans: The Judas Contract	March 31, 2017	DCAMU	Teen Titans: "The Judas Contract"
30	Batman and Harley Quinn	August 15, 2017	DCAU	
31	Batman: Gotham by Gaslight	January 23, 2018	Standalone	Gotham by Gaslight
32	Suicide Squad: Hell to Pay	March 27, 2018	DCAMU	Secret Six: Unhinged
33	The Death of Superman	July 24, 2018	DCAMU	"The Death of Superman"
34	Constantine: City of Demons	January 13, 2019	DCAMU	"Justice League Dark"
35	Reign of the Supermen	January 15, 2019	DCAMU	"Reign of the Supermen!"
36	Justice League vs. the Fatal Five	March 30, 2019	DCAU	
37	Batman: Hush	July 20, 2019	DCAMU	Batman: "Hush"
38	Wonder Woman: Bloodlines	October 5, 2019	DCAMU	Wonder Woman: "Down to Earth" / "Bitter Rivals" / "Eyes of the Gorgon"
39	Superman: Red Son	February 25, 2020	Standalone	Superman: Red Son
40	Justice League Dark: Apokolips War	May 5, 2020	DCAMU	"Darkseid War" / "Final Crisis" / The New 52: Futures End
41	Superman: Man of Tomorrow	August 23, 2020	Tomorrowverse	Superman: Birthright / Superman: American Alien
42	Batman: Soul of the Dragon	January 12, 2021	Standalone	
43	Justice Society: World War II	April 27, 2021	Tomorrowverse	Justice Society of America in "All Star Comics" during World War II, Aquaman in "More Fun Comics", Fleischer Studios Superman cartoons, and some battle scenes in the film were inspired from Flashpoint and Throne of Atlantis storylines.
44	Batman: The Long Halloween, Part One	June 22, 2021	Tomorrowverse	Batman: The Long Halloween
45	Batman: The Long Halloween, Part Two	July 27, 2021	Tomorrowverse	Batman: The Long Halloween
46	Injustice	October 19, 2021	Standalone	Injustice: Gods Among Us (comic / video game)
47	Catwoman: Hunted	February 8, 2022	Standalone	
48	Green Lantern: Beware My Power	July 26, 2022	Tomorrowverse	Green Lantern/Green Arrow / "Emerald Twilight" / Zero Hour: Crisis in Time! / Rann–Thanagar War
49	Batman and Superman: Battle of the Super Sons	October 18, 2022	Standalone	
50	Legion of Super-Heroes	February 7, 2023	Tomorrowverse	
51	Batman: The Doom That Came to Gotham	March 28, 2023	Standalone	Batman: The Doom That Came to Gotham
52	Justice League: Warworld	July 25, 2023	Tomorrowverse	
53	Justice League: Crisis on Infinite Earths – Part One	January 9, 2024	Tomorrowverse	Crisis on Infinite Earths
54	Justice League: Crisis on Infinite Earths – Part Two	April 23, 2024	Tomorrowverse	Crisis on Infinite Earths
55	Justice League: Crisis on Infinite Earths – Part Three	July 16, 2024	Tomorrowverse	Crisis on Infinite Earths
56	Watchmen Chapter I	August 13, 2024	Standalone	Watchmen
57	Watchmen Chapter II	November 26, 2024	Standalone	Watchmen
58	Aztec Batman: Clash of Empires	September 19, 2025	Standalone	
59	Batman: Knightfall – Part 1: Knightfall	August 25, 2026	Standalone	"Batman: Knightfall"
60	Batman: Knightfall – Part 2: Knightquest	December 8, 2026	Standalone	"Batman: Knightfall"
61	Batman: Knightfall – Part 3: KnightsEnd	2027	Standalone	"Batman: Knightfall"

== Short films ==
=== DC Showcase ===
No	Title	Release date	Notes	Included in	Collection
1	The Spectre	February 23, 2010	Featuring the Jim Corrigan version of the Spectre (Gary Cole). The short has Det. Jim Corrigan investigating the murder of a high-end movie executive, ultimately becoming the Spectre to hunt down his killers. The short features supporting cast members Alyssa Milano, Jeff Bennett, Rob Paulsen and Jon Polito.	Justice League: Crisis on Two Earths	DC Showcase Original Shorts Collection
2	Jonah Hex	July 27, 2010	Featuring Jonah Hex (Thomas Jane). Set in the Old West, the short follows Hex as he faces a ruthless swindler to retrieve the body of an outlaw. The short features supporting cast members Linda Hamilton, Jason Marsden, Michael Rooker, and Michelle Trachtenberg.	Batman: Under the Red Hood	DC Showcase Original Shorts Collection
3	Green Arrow	September 28, 2010	Featuring Green Arrow (Neal McDonough). The short follows Oliver Queen, who is waiting for his girlfriend at the airport. Ultimately, he must become Green Arrow to foil an assassination plot that sees a young princess become the target of several assailants. The short features supporting cast members Malcolm McDowell as Merlyn, Steve Blum as Count Vertigo, Grey DeLisle reprising her role as Black Canary from Batman: The Brave and the Bold, John DiMaggio and Ariel Winter.	Superman/Batman: Apocalypse	DC Showcase Original Shorts Collection
4	Superman/Shazam!: The Return of Black Adam	November 9, 2010	Featuring Superman and Captain Marvel. It features George Newbern and Jerry O'Connell reprising their roles of Superman and Captain Marvel from Justice League Unlimited, as well as featuring Zach Callison as Billy Batson, James Garner as Shazam, Kevin Michael Richardson as Mister Tawky Tawny, Arnold Vosloo as Black Adam, Josh Keaton and Danica McKellar. The short film sees a young orphan being targeted by an otherworldly figure. He ultimately discovers an ancient wizard who gives him the ability to transform into a powerful hero, thus allowing him to team up with Superman to properly fight back. The short is 24 minutes.	DC Showcase Original Shorts Collection	DC Showcase Original Shorts Collection
5	Catwoman	October 18, 2011	Featuring Catwoman in a continuation of her storyline in Batman: Year One. The short features Eliza Dushku reprising her role as Catwoman, Liliana Mumy as Holly Robinson and John DiMaggio as Rough Cut. The film also stars Kevin Michael Richardson, Cree Summer and Tara Strong. The short was directed and produced by Lauren Montgomery and written by Paul Dini. The short sees Selina Kyle confronting an illegal diamond trafficking operation that has also resulted in the disappearance of several women. A special feature presentation was shown at the New York Comic Con.	Batman: Year One	
6	Sgt. Rock	August 6, 2019	Featuring Karl Urban voicing the eponymous character. The short follows the title character, a worn-out veteran, who suddenly finds himself leading a platoon of legendary monsters against an army of Nazi zombies. Keith Ferguson, William Salyers, and Audrey Wasilewski also star.	Batman: Hush	DC Showcase Animated Shorts – Batman: Death in the Family
7	Death	October 22, 2019	Featuring Jamie Chung as the title character. The short follows Death as she meets a down-on-his-luck artist named Vincent (Leonardo Nam) to help him make peace with his inner demons.	Wonder Woman: Bloodlines	DC Showcase Animated Shorts – Batman: Death in the Family
8	The Phantom Stranger	March 17, 2020	Starring Peter Serafinowicz as the Phantom Stranger. In the 1970s, a young adult named Marcie, along with her friends, attend a party at an abandoned mansion hosted by the enigmatic Seth (Michael Rosenbaum). However, when weird things start to happen, the Phantom Stranger must save her. Supporting cast includes Natalie Lander, Grey Griffin, and Roger Craig Smith.	Superman: Red Son	DC Showcase Animated Shorts – Batman: Death in the Family
9	Adam Strange	May 19, 2020	Starring Charlie Weber as the titular hero. The short sees Strange living in an asteroid mining colony with its population seeing him as an interplanetary derelict. He reveals his true nature by saving them from alien insects, while his origin story is revealed in flashbacks. Roger R. Cross, Kimberly Brooks, Ray Chase, and Fred Tatasciore also star. Butch Lukic confirmed in 2022 that the short is part of Tomorrowverse, it shows the backstory of Adam Strange featured in Green Lantern: Beware My Power.	Justice League Dark: Apokolips War	DC Showcase Animated Shorts – Batman: Death in the Family
10	Batman: Death in the Family	October 13, 2020	An interactive, long-form animated short that is based on the comic storyline of the same name by Jim Starlin and Jim Aparo, and is a sequel to Batman: Under the Red Hood. Reprising their roles are Bruce Greenwood (as Batman), Vincent Martella (young Jason Todd), John DiMaggio (Joker) and Gary Cole (Commissioner James Gordon), respectively. Cole also provides the voice for Two-Face. Additionally, Zehra Fazal joins the cast as Talia al Ghul.	DC Showcase Animated Shorts – Batman: Death in the Family	DC Showcase Animated Shorts – Batman: Death in the Family
11	Kamandi: The Last Boy on Earth!	April 27, 2021	Starring Cameron Monaghan as the titular hero. The short that is based on Kamandi #29 follows Kamandi and his friends Prince Tuftan (Steve Blum) of the Tiger Kingdom and nuclear man Ben Boxer (Armen Taylor) as they are kidnapped by a gorilla cult led by Golgan (also voiced by Blum) dedicated to finding the reincarnation of their god The Mighty One. From there, they're forced into a series of harrowing challenges alongside their representative Zuma (Adam Gifford) that serve to prove their belief. Jeremy Adams confirmed in 2022 that the short is part of the Tomorrowverse, and connects with Justice Society: World War II.	Justice Society: World War II	DC Showcase Animated Shorts – Constantine: The House of Mystery
12	The Losers	June 22, 2021	The short tells the story of the titular team consisting of World War II outcasts Captain William Storm (Dean Winters), Johnny Cloud (Martin Sensmeier), Henry "Mile a Minute" Jones (Eugene Byrd), Gunner (Dave B. Mitchell), and Sarge (also voiced by Mitchell), as they find themselves marooned on Dinosaur Island and they work with Fan Long (Ming-Na Wen) to rescue the scientists that were studying the space-time anomaly there.	Batman: The Long Halloween, Part One	DC Showcase Animated Shorts – Constantine: The House of Mystery
13	Blue Beetle	July 27, 2021	Starring Matt Lanter as the titular hero. The short, in a parody of the 1967 Spider-Man animated series, features Blue Beetle collaborating with Captain Atom (Jeff Bennett), Nightshade (Ashly Burch), and Question (David Kaye) to fight Doctor Spectro (Tom Kenny).	Batman: The Long Halloween, Part Two	DC Showcase Animated Shorts – Constantine: The House of Mystery
14	Constantine: The House of Mystery	May 3, 2022	Immediately following the ending of Justice League Dark: Apokolips War, where the Flash traveled back in time to create a new Flashpoint, John Constantine (Matt Ryan) wakes up in the House of Mystery with no recollection of how he got there. In each room he enters, he is set upon and killed by his friends, who have become demons. When Constantine escapes from the House of Mystery, the Spectre (Lou Diamond Phillips) appears and explains that he put Constantine in the House to protect him from the punishment the universe had prepared for his time-travel violations. The House was intended to be peaceful, but Constantine's deep self-hatred and guilt transformed his friends into demons as a subconscious form of self-punishment. Subsequently, Constantine is dragged screaming into the light as he begs Spectre to kill him. After Constantine is far away, Spectre quotes "Woe to you, John Constantine".	DC Showcase Animated Shorts – Constantine: The House of Mystery	DC Showcase Animated Shorts – Constantine: The House of Mystery

=== Other short films ===
Year	Title	Notes
2015	Nightwing and Robin	A 45-second short film set during the events of the DC Animated Movie Universe film Justice League: Throne of Atlantis. The two main characters are called upon by Batman to find and capture the Scarecrow (Michael Rosenbaum) since he had to help the Justice League. While Jason O'Mara reprises Batman in this short, only his voice is heard while Nightwing and Robin have no dialogue. Talon (who would be featured in Batman vs. Robin) makes a silent cameo in the film.

== Other projects ==
=== Unannounced projects ===
Beyond the list of announced projects, creators involved in various levels at DC Comics have brought up names of possible future projects.

- Bruce Timm has said that he would like to do a full-length animated Green Arrow film following the positive reception of DC Showcase: Green Arrow.
- DC's ex-executive editor Dan DiDio has expressed interest in seeing the popular 2007–2008 Sinestro Corps War comic storyline adapted.
- In 2009, Timm also expressed his interest to make an animated JLA/Avengers adaptation.
- Geoff Johns revealed that Warner Bros. would like to use unproduced screenplays as a basis for new animated films, such as J. J. Abrams' Superman: Flyby.
- Producer James Tucker has spoken about wanting a Wonder Woman-centered Justice League film.
- At Comic-Con, Timm also had expressed interest in an animated adaptation of the Batman R.I.P. storyline.
- Batman: The Killing Joke screenwriter Brian Azzarello had stated that he would like to adapt his graphic novel Joker into an animated film.
- Timm has mentioned that another Batman Beyond film is a possibility, and in August 2017, Tucker stated in his Twitter account that discussions about a possible Batman Beyond film occur several times at the studio, while he also stated that a potential Static Shock film set in the DC Animated Universe is possible as the studio is always interested in Static.
- J. M. DeMatteis expressed interest in scripting an adaptation of his Batman story arc Going Sane and a New Gods film set in the DC Animated Movie Universe. This partially came into play with the film Justice League: Gods and Monsters, visually and aesthetically invoking the DCAU, confirmed to be in an alternate timeline to it.
- Filmmaker and comic book writer Kevin Smith mentioned at Calgary Comic and Entertainment Expo that he met with Johns, where he pitched an animated Plastic Man film that he wrote for DC.
- An animated film featuring characters from the Milestone Media imprint was announced at DC Fandome in October 2021. The film was set to be written by Brandon Thomas and will feature "more than one character" according to Milestone co-founder Denys Cowan. The announcement included promotional concept art of Static, Hardware, Icon, and Rocket.

=== Cancelled projects ===
- Plans for sequels to the 2009 films Wonder Woman and Green Lantern: First Flight were shelved, as well as a planned film based on the 2003 miniseries Batgirl: Year One. Slower sales of the Wonder Woman film were cited, although sales figures indicate that it was at least the #8 best-selling of the 25 DC Universe films released as of August 2015 (4 of the films that ranked higher than it include Blu-ray sales which have not been released for Wonder Woman).
- In 2010, Timm stated that the production team originally planned to make an Aquaman film, but at the end, the executives of Warner Bros. cancelled the project because their expectations about marketing were very low.
- During an interview in October 2016, Jay Oliva revealed that he had an idea for a sequel to Batman: Assault on Arkham, but following Oliva's departure from Warner Bros. Animation in 2017, as well as the film's apparent decanonization in Suicide Squad: Kill the Justice League, the project may have been pulled.
- In 2023, the creative team for Justice League: Warworld planned to develop a film adaptation of the Kingdom Come comic book miniseries, but the idea was discarded by James Gunn and Peter Safran after they were named CEOs of DC Studios.

== Reception ==
=== Sales performance ===
Sales figures below represent, when available, DVD and Blu-ray sales in the United States. Theatrical ticket, digital, and rental sales are not included.

Title	Release date	Gross	Ref.
Superman: Doomsday	September 18, 2007	$10,102,202	
Justice League: The New Frontier	February 26, 2008	$5,735,377	
Batman: Gotham Knight	July 8, 2008	$8,539,068	
Wonder Woman	March 3, 2009	$9,904,313	
Green Lantern: First Flight	July 28, 2009	$8,484,729	
Superman/Batman: Public Enemies	September 29, 2009	$11,014,346	
Justice League: Crisis on Two Earths	February 23, 2010	$8,636,868	
Batman: Under the Red Hood	July 27, 2010	$12,411,958	
Superman/Batman: Apocalypse	September 28, 2010	$8,839,887	
Superman/Shazam!: The Return of Black Adam	November 9, 2010	$5,983,521	
All-Star Superman	February 22, 2011	$7,539,076	
Green Lantern: Emerald Knights	June 8, 2011	$5,749,225	
Batman: Year One	October 18, 2011	$6,137,182	
Justice League: Doom	February 28, 2012	$7,539,282	
Superman vs. The Elite	June 12, 2012	$3,184,408	
Batman: The Dark Knight Returns – Part 1	September 25, 2012	$6,006,141	
Batman: The Dark Knight Returns – Part 2	January 29, 2013	$4,315,736	
Superman: Unbound	May 7, 2013	$3,523,760	
Justice League: The Flashpoint Paradox	July 30, 2013	$5,260,646	
Justice League: War	February 4, 2014	$5,802,728	
Son of Batman	May 6, 2014	$7,023,969	
Batman: Assault on Arkham	August 12, 2014	$5,946,258	
Justice League: Throne of Atlantis	January 27, 2015	$4,657,085	
Batman vs. Robin	April 14, 2015	$4,657,085	
Justice League: Gods and Monsters	July 21, 2015	$2,972,092	
Batman: Bad Blood	February 2, 2016	$4,865,442	
Justice League vs. Teen Titans	March 26, 2016	$4,865,442	
Batman: The Killing Joke	October 10, 2016	$8,994,247	
Justice League Dark	January 24, 2017	$3,318,438	
Teen Titans: The Judas Contract	March 31, 2017	$3,272,927	
Batman and Harley Quinn	August 15, 2017	$2,247,876	
Batman: Gotham by Gaslight	January 23, 2018	$4,697,126	
Suicide Squad: Hell to Pay	March 27, 2018	$2,865,568	
The Death of Superman	July 24, 2018	$6,546,576	
Reign of the Supermen	January 13, 2019	$3,773,664	
Justice League vs. the Fatal Five	April 16, 2019	$2,185,458	
Batman: Hush	July 20, 2019	$3,597,264	
Wonder Woman: Bloodlines	October 5, 2019	$1,718,374	
Superman: Red Son	February 25, 2020	$2,032,174	
Justice League Dark: Apokolips War	May 5, 2020	$5,513,095	
Deathstroke: Knights & Dragons	August 4, 2020	$4,017,350	
Superman: Man of Tomorrow	October 5, 2020	$3,400,133	
Batman: Death in the Family	October 13, 2020	$3,675,151	
Batman: Soul of the Dragon	January 12, 2021	$2,421,468	
Justice Society: World War II	May 10, 2021	$3,617,118	
Batman: The Long Halloween, Part One	June 22, 2021	$3,607,779	
Batman: The Long Halloween, Part Two	July 27, 2021	$2,551,203	
Injustice	October 29, 2021	$2,668,958	
Catwoman: Hunted	February 8, 2022	$406,379	
Constantine: The House of Mystery	May 3, 2022	$401,011	
Green Lantern: Beware My Power	July 26, 2022	$775,269	
Batman and Superman: Battle of the Super Sons	October 18, 2022	$1,356,148	
Total		$257,227,163	—
Average		$5,167,547	—

=== Critical response ===
Each film is linked to the "Critical response" section of its article.

Film	Rotten Tomatoes
Superman: Doomsday	57% (7 reviews)
Justice League: The New Frontier	71%
Batman: Gotham Knight	75% (8 reviews)
Wonder Woman	85% (13 reviews)
Green Lantern: First Flight	63% (8 reviews)
Superman/Batman: Public Enemies	67%
Justice League: Crisis on Two Earths	73%
Batman: Under the Red Hood	100% (11 reviews)
Superman/Batman: Apocalypse	20% (5 reviews)
Superman/Shazam!: The Return of Black Adam	63%
All-Star Superman	80% (5 reviews)
Green Lantern: Emerald Knights	80% (5 reviews)
Batman: Year One	89% (9 reviews)
Justice League: Doom	100%
Superman vs. The Elite	80% (5 reviews)
Batman: The Dark Knight Returns – Part 1	100% (5 reviews)
Batman: The Dark Knight Returns – Part 2	94%
Superman: Unbound	100% (5 reviews)
Justice League: The Flashpoint Paradox	100% (5 reviews)
Justice League: War	57% (6 reviews)
Son of Batman	64% (11 reviews)
Batman: Assault on Arkham	75% (8 reviews)
Justice League: Throne of Atlantis	63% (7 reviews)
Batman vs. Robin	100% (5 reviews)
Justice League: Gods and Monsters	88% (8 reviews)
Batman: Bad Blood	100% (5 reviews)
Justice League vs. Teen Titans	80% (5 reviews)
Batman: The Killing Joke	39% (41 reviews)
Justice League Dark	78% (9 reviews)
Teen Titans: The Judas Contract	83% (6 reviews)
Batman and Harley Quinn	50% (11 reviews)
Batman: Gotham by Gaslight	75% (12 reviews)
Suicide Squad: Hell to Pay	88% (8 reviews)
The Death of Superman	92% (13 reviews)
Reign of the Supermen	75%
Justice League vs. the Fatal Five	100% (8 reviews)
Batman: Hush	88% (17 reviews)
Wonder Woman: Bloodlines	88% (8 reviews)
Superman: Red Son	88% (16 reviews)
Justice League Dark: Apokolips War	100% (18 reviews)
Deathstroke: Knights & Dragons	82% (11 reviews)
Superman: Man of Tomorrow	100% (13 reviews)
Batman: Soul of the Dragon	93% (14 reviews)
Justice Society: World War II	81% (16 reviews)
Batman: The Long Halloween, Part One	100% (19 reviews)
Batman: The Long Halloween, Part Two	100% (13 reviews)
Injustice	60% (5 reviews)
Catwoman: Hunted	78% (9 reviews)
Green Lantern: Beware My Power	56% (9 reviews)
Batman and Superman: Battle of the Super Sons	100% (9 reviews)
Legion of Super-Heroes	60% (5 reviews)
Batman: The Doom That Came to Gotham	77% (13 reviews)
Justice League: Warworld	50% (6 reviews)
Justice League: Crisis on Infinite Earths – Part One	88% (8 reviews)
Justice League: Crisis on Infinite Earths – Part Two	17% (6 reviews)
Justice League: Crisis on Infinite Earths – Part Three	20% (5 reviews)
Watchmen Chapter I	92% (12 reviews)
Watchmen Chapter II	73%
Aztec Batman: Clash of Empires	67%
Batman: Knightfall – Part 1: Knightfall	92%

== Continuities ==
=== Stand-alone films ===
The following films are stand-alone, and do not share continuities with each other or other films (note exceptions).

- Superman: Doomsday (2007)
- Justice League: The New Frontier (2008)
- Wonder Woman (2009)
- Green Lantern: First Flight (2009)
- Batman: Under the Red Hood (2010)
  - Batman: Death in the Family (interactive short) (2020)
- All-Star Superman (2011)
- Green Lantern: Emerald Knights (2011)
- Superman vs. The Elite (2012)
- Superman: Unbound (2013)
- Justice League: Gods and Monsters (2015)
  - Justice League: Gods and Monsters Chronicles (web series) (2015)
- Batman: The Killing Joke (2016)
- Batman: Gotham by Gaslight (2018)
- Superman: Red Son (2020)
- Deathstroke: Knights & Dragons (2020)
- Batman: Soul of the Dragon (2021)
- Injustice (2021)
- Catwoman: Hunted (2022)
- Batman and Superman: Battle of the Super Sons (2022)
- Batman: The Doom That Came to Gotham (2023)
- Watchmen (two parts) (2024)
- Aztec Batman: Clash of Empires (2025)
- Batman: Knightfall (three parts) (2026-2027)

=== Superman/Batman ===
This continuity is based on the Superman/Batman storyline.

- Superman/Batman: Public Enemies (2009)
- Superman/Batman: Apocalypse (2010)

=== Justice League (JLA) ===
This continuity is based on JLA storylines published in 2000.

- Justice League: Crisis on Two Earths (2010)
- Justice League: Doom (2012)

=== Dark Knight Returns ===
This continuity is based on Frank Miller's Batman: Year One arc and The Dark Knight Returns.

- Batman: Year One (2011)
  - DC Showcase: Catwoman (short film) (2011)
- Batman: The Dark Knight Returns Pt. 1 (2012)
- Batman: The Dark Knight Returns Pt. 2 (2013)

=== DC Animated Movie Universe ===
A shared universe, with influences from The New 52 continuity and various DC eras and productions.

- Justice League: The Flashpoint Paradox (2013)
- Justice League: War (2014)
- Son of Batman (2014)
- Justice League: Throne of Atlantis (2015)
  - Nightwing and Robin (45 second short film) (2015)
- Batman vs. Robin (2015)
- Batman: Bad Blood (2016)
- Justice League vs. Teen Titans (2016)
- Justice League Dark (2017)
  - Constantine: City of Demons (web series later compiled into a film) (2018)
- Teen Titans: The Judas Contract (2017)
- Suicide Squad: Hell to Pay (2018)
  - Suicide Squad: Hell to Pay (sequel comic) (2018)
- The Death of Superman (2018)
  - The Death of Superman: Part 1 (prequel/sequel comic) (2018)
- Reign of the Supermen (2019)
- Batman: Hush (2019)
- Wonder Woman: Bloodlines (2019)
- Justice League Dark: Apokolips War (2020)
- Constantine: The House of Mystery (short film) (2022)

"Tomorrowverse"

- Superman: Man of Tomorrow (2020)
  - Adam Strange (short film) (2020)
- Justice Society: World War II (2021)
- Batman: The Long Halloween, Part One (2021)
- Batman: The Long Halloween, Part Two (2021)
  - The Losers (short film) (2021)
  - Kamandi: The Last Boy on Earth! (short film) (2021)
  - Blue Beetle (short film) (2021)
- Green Lantern: Beware My Power (2022)
- Legion of Super-Heroes (2023)
- Justice League: Warworld (2023)
- Justice League: Crisis on Infinite Earths – Part One (2024)
- Justice League: Crisis on Infinite Earths – Part Two (2024)
- Justice League: Crisis on Infinite Earths – Part Three (2024)

=== DC Animated Universe ===
This continuity is set in the DC Animated Universe (although the canonicity is open-ended)

- Batman and Harley Quinn (2017)
- Justice League vs. the Fatal Five (2019)

=== Other universes ===
- Batman: Gotham Knight (set in the Nolanverse) (2008)
- Batman: Assault on Arkham (set in the Arkhamverse, although Suicide Squad: Kill the Justice League causes a number of continuity contradictions) (2014)
