= DC Showcase: Green Arrow =

2010 film directed by Joaquim Dos Santos

- Green Arrow title banner
- Directed by: Joaquim Dos Santos
- Written by: Greg Weisman
- Based on: Green Arrow by Mort Weisinger and George Papp
- Produced by: Bobbie Page; Joaquim Dos Santos
- Starring: Neal McDonough; Malcolm McDowell; Ariel Winter; Steve Blum; Grey DeLisle; John DiMaggio
- Music by: Benjamin Wynn; Jeremy Zuckerman
- Production companies: Warner Bros. Animation; Warner Premiere; DC Comics
- Distributed by: Warner Home Video
- Release date: September 28, 2010
- Running time: 12 minutes
- Language: English

DC Showcase: Green Arrow is a 2010 short animated film, directed by Joaquim Dos Santos and written by Greg Weisman, featuring Neal McDonough as Green Arrow, who must protect a young princess, Perdita, from Count Vertigo. The film was released on September 28, 2010 as a bonus feature on the Superman/Batman: Apocalypse DVD. It is the third of the DC Showcase series and was included on the compilation DVD DC Showcase Original Shorts Collection in an extended version.

Greg Weisman considers DC Showcase: Green Arrow to be adjacent to the animated series Young Justice, meaning a version of its events happened within the series's continuity. The character of Perdita, who originated in DC Showcase: Green Arrow, appeared as a recurring character in Young Justice. In 2022, the comic series Young Justice: Targets showed the canon version of these events, which has differences to the short.

== Plot ==
While waiting outside Star City international airport for his girlfriend Dinah Laurel Lance, Oliver Queen discovers Merlyn is there to assassinate Princess Perdita of Vlatava. After fighting off a group of thugs, Oliver rescues Perdita, who he learns recently became Vlatava's queen following her father's assassination and Merlyn was hired by her uncle, who stands to become the new king in the event of her death. Eventually, Oliver defeats Merlyn and his men but is overpowered by Perdita's uncle, Count Vertigo. Nonetheless, Dinah arrives to defeat him. Afterward, Oliver proposes to Dinah with Perdita's help and they kiss.

== Cast ==
- Neal McDonough as Green Arrow / Oliver Queen
- Malcolm McDowell as Merlyn
- Steve Blum as Count Vertigo
- Grey DeLisle as Black Canary / Dinah Laurel Lance
- John DiMaggio as Merc #1
- Ariel Winter as Princess Perdita
