= Superman: Red Son (film) =

2020 film by Sam Liu

- Blu-ray release cover
- Directed by: Sam Liu
- Screenplay by: J.M. DeMatteis
- Based on: Superman: Red Son by Mark Millar
- Produced by: Sam Liu; Amy McKenna
- Starring: Jason Isaacs; Amy Acker; Diedrich Bader
- Edited by: Christopher D. Lozinski
- Music by: Frederik Wiedmann
- Production companies: Warner Bros. Animation; DC Entertainment
- Distributed by: Warner Bros. Home Entertainment
- Release date: February 25, 2020
- Running time: 84 minutes
- Country: United States
- Language: English

Superman: Red Son is a 2020 American animated superhero film focusing on the DC Comics character Superman, and the 40th film of the DC Universe Animated Original Movies. The film is based on the 2003 comic book miniseries of the same name written by Mark Millar and pencilled by Dave Johnson, Andrew Robinson, Walden Wong and Killian Plunkett. In the film, instead of landing in Kansas after being shot away from a doomed Krypton, Superman lands in Ukraine and is raised on a kolkhoz. As he grows up, he is found by the Soviet Union authorities and pressed into service to Joseph Stalin himself.

It was released digitally on February 25, 2020 and was released on Ultra HD Blu-ray and Blu-ray on March 17. This was the final film of Jim Ward before his retirement in 2021 and death in 2025.

== Plot ==
In the Soviet Union in 1946, a young boy is chased by a gang of bullies. A young girl, Svetlana, defends him by chasing them away. He reveals to her that he was not scared for his own safety, but for the bullies', before demonstrating superhuman strength and the ability to fly. Svetlana urges the boy to use his powers for the good of their country.

A decade later, in 1955, the Soviet government releases a propaganda film of an alien superhuman adopted and educated by Joseph Stalin, dubbed the "Soviet Superman". U.S. President Dwight D. Eisenhower recruits the nation's best scientist, Alexander "Lex" Luthor, to devise countermeasures against Superman. Luthor manipulates Superman into preventing a satellite from crashing into Metropolis so that his reporter fiancée Lois Lane has an excuse to interview him. During the interview, Lois reveals a stolen top-secret document that leads Superman to a lead-shielded gulag. There, he meets a young boy surrounded by bats and a dying Svetlana, who was imprisoned there by Stalin because she knew his real identity. Enraged, Superman confronts and kills Stalin before declaring himself the new leader of the Soviet Union.

Superman advances communist ideals across the world, ending the Korean War and demolishing the Berlin Wall, which the Western powers built to deter him. He also forges an alliance and close friendship with Princess Diana / Wonder Woman of Themyscira. Luthor unveils a clone of Superman, dubbed "Superior Man", who is sent to confront him. The two battle until Luthor overloads the clone with excess energy to keep up with Superman's power, causing it to degenerate and dissolve into protoplasm. Superman is left appalled by Luthor's actions.

In 1966, Superman stops an invasion by the alien cyborg Brainiac, who is reprogrammed to provide the Soviet Union with advanced technology to support the Warsaw Pact, as well as lobotomize Soviet dissidents. However, he is unable to prevent Brainiac from shrinking the city of Stalingrad and faces a growing threat from the terrorist Batman, who has sworn to "destroy" Superman to avenge his parents' deaths in the gulag. Batman kidnaps Wonder Woman and binds her with the Lasso of Truth to lead Superman into a trap, using lamps that simulate Krypton's red sun to neutralize his powers. Batman easily bests Superman in personal combat and leaves him to die in a sealed pit, but Wonder Woman frees herself and disables the lamps, restoring his powers. Batman promptly commits suicide with a bomb implanted near his heart. Wonder Women renounces human civilization for its cruelty and returns to Themyscira.

Luthor is elected President and ushers in a new age of prosperity that threatens Soviet dominance. Finding Abin Sur's crashed spaceship and body, Luthor tasks his military aide, Colonel Hal Jordan, with uncovering the power of Sur's ring, leading to the formation of the "Green Lantern Marine Corps". In 1983, Jordan leads the Corps in an attack on Superman, which is briefly halted by Wonder Woman, who tries one last time to end the conflict before announcing that Themyscira will be closed to all men forever.

With Brainiac's encouragement, Superman confronts Luthor at the White House, only to find Lois with the bottled city of Stalingrad. Superman tells her that for years he has tried and failed to reverse the miniaturization of the city, but Brainiac reveals that the technology has always been available to him; he just chose not to mention it, and Superman gave him no direct order to reverse the process. Realizing the error of his ways, Superman stands down, but Brainiac destroys the city and continues the attack, having faked servitude to Superman to finish his conquest. Superman and Luthor join forces to destroy Brainiac, but his ship is set to self-destruct. Superman flies the ship out into deep space, apparently dying in the explosion.

At a ceremony in front of the Capitol Building, a disguised Superman watches from the crowd as Luthor resigns to spend more time with Lois, handing over the country to Vice President James Olsen. Lois shares a brief glimpse of Superman before he disappears into the crowd.

== Cast ==
- Jason Isaacs as Superman
- Diedrich Bader as Lex Luthor
- Amy Acker as Lois Lane
- Sasha Roiz as Hal Jordan
- Vanessa Marshall as Wonder Woman
- Phil Morris as James Olsen
- Paul Williams as Brainiac
- Phil LaMarr as John Stewart, Ron Troupe
- Jim Meskimen as Dwight D. Eisenhower, John F. Kennedy
- William Salyers as Joseph Stalin, Jack Ryder (uncredited)
- Roger Craig Smith as Batman
- Jason Spisak as Dimitri
- Tara Strong as Young Superman
- Travis Willingham as Superior Man, Guy Gardner, Petrovich
- Winter Ave Zoli as Svetlana
- Greg Chun as Ambassador Lee
- Jim Ward as George Taylor

== Production ==
In 2013, Warner Bros. Animation producer James Tucker said that a Superman: Red Son film adaptation had been discussed at the studio and that he personally would be interested in such a project. On January 8, 2019, it was announced that a direct-to-video film adaption of the comic was in development, as part of the DC Universe Animated Original Movies line.

== Reception ==
Superman: Red Son received generally positive reviews. As of August 2024, 89% of the 18 reviews compiled by Rotten Tomatoes are positive, and have an average score of 7.6/10. IGN gave the film a 7/10 score due to its "underwhelming ending and bland animation style".

=== Russian media reception ===
The presenters of the pro-Kremlin TV channel Russia-24 Alexey Kazakov and Anastasia Ivanova described the film as "Russophobic hysteria", further stating that "if Russia had not been so interesting, then there would have been no 'Red Son'." In the program Time Will Tell, the film adaptation was called an element of a serious information war against Russia, the purpose of which is to form the image of the enemy. Anatoly Kuzichev concluded: "Comics are evil. Literature only!" On the other hand, Yevgeni Popov considers this marketing without political background. According to the journalist, "we need to focus on our heroes."

Mir Fantastiki criticized the adaptation, primarily for changes in the plot compared to the comic book. Reviewer DTF [ru] noted that in the film adaptation, the atmosphere of the original was completely lost, and the main plot twist was removed from the final product. In the review of Disgusting Men, the film was called very weak, having lost the main idea and depth of the comic and having cheap animation.

=== Sales ===
The film earned $615,905 from domestic DVD sales and $1,447,215 from domestic Blu-ray sales, bringing its total home video earning to $2,063,120.
