= Sam Liu =

American animation producer, director, storyboard artist and character designer

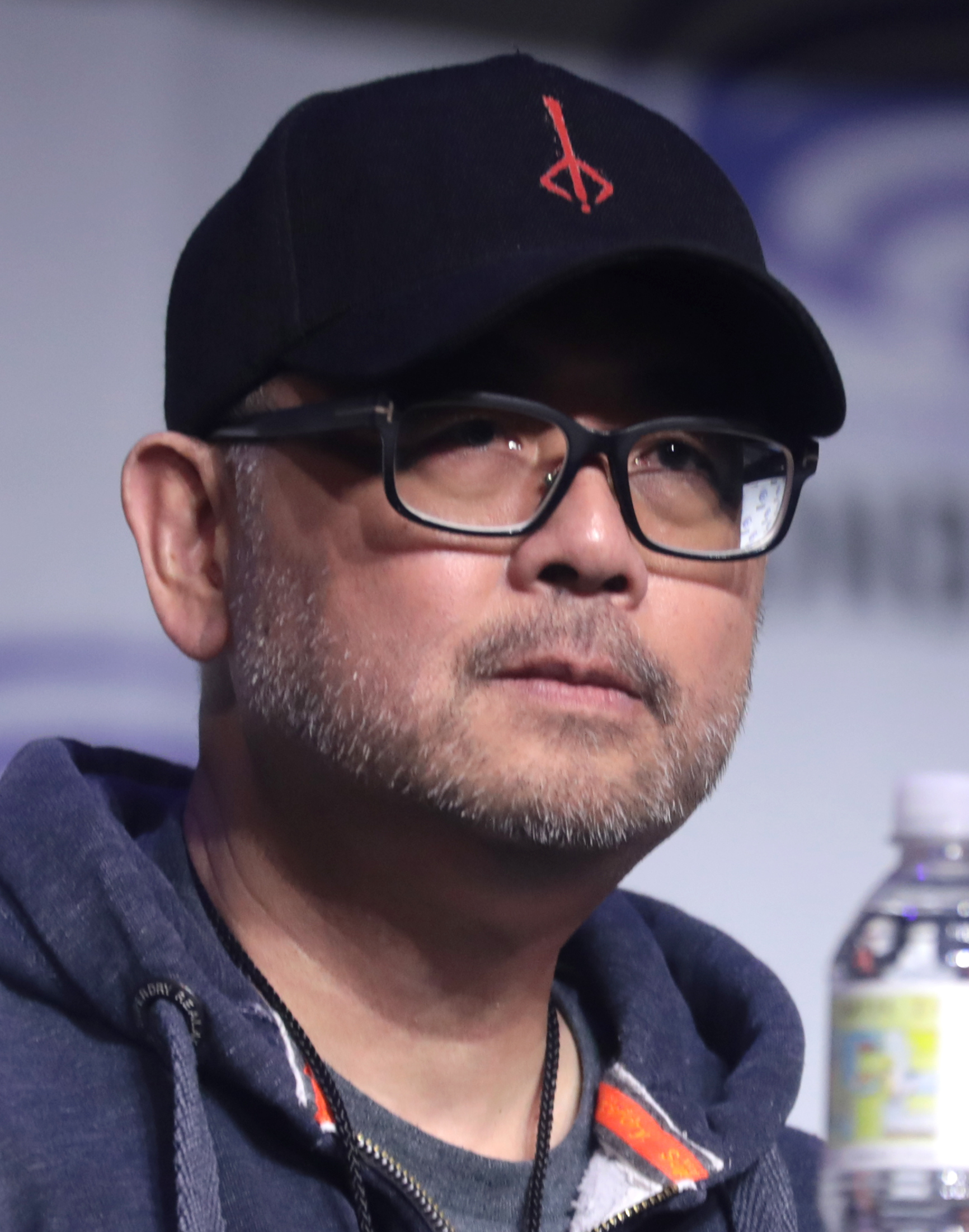
Liu at the 2023 WonderCon

Sam Liu is an American animation producer, director, storyboard artist and character designer. He is best known for directing animated superhero films at both Marvel Entertainment and Warner Bros. Animation.

Liu attended the University of California, Santa Cruz for fine art then went on to Art Center College of Design as an illustration major. While at UCSC he illustrated for the first Cyberpunk RPG from R. Talsorian Games.

Liu's first job was in comic books, penciling for Image Comics. In 1996, he moved to animation, directing Roughnecks: Starship Troopers Chronicles and Godzilla: The Series for Sony Animation. He later went to Sony Computer Entertainment of America to design characters for PlayStation, then came back to animation, winning a Daytime Emmy Award for his work on The Batman series in 2006. He was a sequence director for The Batman vs Dracula.

He has since worked on many animated films for Marvel Entertainment and Warner Bros. Animation, including All-Star Superman, Superman/Batman: Public Enemies, Hulk Vs, Planet Hulk, Thor: Son of Asgard, and co-directing with Lauren Montgomery on Justice League: Crisis on Two Earths and Batman: Year One. Liu was also the primary character designer for Superman/Batman: Apocalypse. In 2010, Liu moved back to television, directing Green Lantern: The Animated Series with Bruce Timm, and Beware the Batman with Glen Murakami.

He then directed the animated film Justice League: Gods and Monsters, its companion series Justice League: Gods and Monsters Chronicles written by Bruce Timm, the animated film Justice League vs. Teen Titans, Justice League vs. the Fatal Five, the animated adaptation of Batman: The Killing Joke, the animated films Teen Titans: The Judas Contract and Batman and Harley Quinn, the animated adaptation of Gotham by Gaslight, and the animated film Suicide Squad: Hell to Pay.

Along with Jake Castorena, Liu co-directed the first-installment animated adaptation of The Death of Superman. Liu then directed the sequel animated adaptation Reign of the Supermen and the animated film Justice League vs. the Fatal Five. He then co-directed Wonder Woman: Bloodlines with Justin Copeland which came with the DC Showcase: Death short which he solo produced and directed. He then directed the standalone film Superman: Red Son, which he also co-produced. Most recently, he directed and co-produced another standalone film, Batman: Soul of the Dragon.
