= Batman: The Killing Joke (film) =

2016 film by Sam Liu

- Promotional poster
- Directed by: Sam Liu
- Written by: Brian Azzarello
- Based on: Batman: The Killing Joke by: Alan Moore; Brian Bolland
- Produced by: Bruce Timm; Alan Burnett; Sam Register
- Starring: Kevin Conroy; Mark Hamill; Tara Strong; Ray Wise
- Edited by: Christopher D. Lozinski
- Music by: Kristopher Carter; Michael McCuistion; Lolita Ritmanis
- Production companies: DC Entertainment; Warner Bros. Animation; The Answer Studio
- Distributed by: Warner Bros. Pictures; Fathom Events
- Release dates: July 22, 2016 (San Diego Comic-Con); July 25, 2016 (United States)
- Running time: 77 minutes
- Country: United States
- Language: English
- Budget: $3.5 million
- Box office: $4.4 million

Batman: The Killing Joke is a 2016 American adult animated superhero film produced by Warner Bros. Animation and distributed by Warner Bros. Pictures. Featuring the DC Comics character Batman, the film is the 27th of the DC Universe Animated Original Movies, based on the graphic novel of the same name by Alan Moore and Brian Bolland. The film is directed by Sam Liu, written by Brian Azzarello and stars the voices of Kevin Conroy, Mark Hamill, Tara Strong, and Ray Wise. Like the novel, the film follows the Joker, Batman's arch-nemesis, and his efforts to drive police commissioner James Gordon insane as Batman works desperately to stop him.

Development of a film adaptation of the novel began in 2009. Production was stalled due to the under-performance of DC's live-action adaptation of Moore's Watchmen. In 2011, Hamill expressed interest in reprising his role of the Joker for the adaptation, resulting in a fan campaign for its production. In 2015, producer Bruce Timm confirmed that an animated feature based on the book was in development. It is the first Batman film and Warner Bros. Animation film to be rated R by the MPAA.

Batman: The Killing Joke premiered at San Diego Comic-Con on July 22, 2016. The film was originally intended to be released directly on home video but, due to its popularity, was instead released simultaneously in theaters and digitally on July 25, 2016, for a special one-night event. It released on DVD and Blu-ray August 2, 2016. The film received mixed reviews from critics, with most of the criticism aimed at the film's first half. It grossed $4.4 million worldwide and became the 9th highest-grossing R-rated animated film worldwide.

== Plot ==
While out on patrol one evening, Barbara Gordon (Batgirl) fails to stop a robbery in progress but, with the help of Batman, manages to apprehend one of the criminals involved. The perpetrator is Paris Franz, nephew of a powerful mob boss. Franz becomes attracted to Batgirl and starts sending her messages. After Franz tricks her into finding his uncle's dead body, Batman becomes concerned for Barbara's safety and takes her off the case, arguing that she will eventually be tempted to kill the criminals she pursues. Outraged, Batgirl begins attacking Batman physically and verbally, which quickly spirals into them having intercourse. A few nights later, Batgirl tries to apologize to Batman, but he is ambushed by Franz and his men, prompting her to come to his aid. When she arrives and overpowers Franz, he makes her lose control, resulting in a brutal beating with Batgirl stopping just short of killing Franz. Realizing Batman was right, she retires from crime-fighting.

Later, Batman investigates a murder scene with Detective Harvey Bullock and concludes that the Joker, currently held at Arkham Asylum, must be behind the crime. Batman goes to Arkham to talk to Joker, only to discover that he has escaped and put a decoy in his place. Joker then attacks Barbara and her father, Commissioner James Gordon. He shoots her in the stomach, paralyzing her from the waist down, kidnaps Gordon and takes him to an abandoned amusement park. There, Joker removes his clothes and subjects him to torture, particularly by showing him photos he took of Barbara, naked and in pain, much to Gordon's horror.

The story is intercut with flashbacks of Joker's origin story. It is revealed that he was once a lab technician who quit his job to become a stand-up comedian, only to fail miserably. Desperate to support his pregnant wife Jeannie, he agrees to help two criminals rob his former workplace. The criminals tell him that he has to use the Red Hood's mask and cape, secretly intending to frame him. During the planning, the police interrupt to inform the comedian that Jeannie and their unborn child have died in a household accident. Grief-stricken by the loss of his family, he tries to withdraw from the plan, but the criminals convince him into keeping his commitment to them, which he reluctantly accepts.

At the plant, the criminals and the costumed comedian run into security personnel. As the group attempts to escape the plant, the criminals are gunned down and the comedian is confronted by Batman. Terrified and unaware of his surroundings, the comedian trips and falls into the chemical plant's waste pond and is swept through a pipe leading to the outside. As he removes his mask, he is shocked to see the chemicals have permanently disfigured his face, giving him a clown-like appearance. His disfigurement, combined with the loss of his family and what he had experienced in the chemical plant, drives him completely insane and transforms him into the Joker.

In the present, Batman finds and saves Gordon as the Joker flees. Gordon remains sane and demands that Batman capture the Joker "by the book". Batman follows the Joker as the latter tries to persuade him that the world is merely one big joke and that "one bad day" is all it takes to drive an ordinary man insane. Batman subdues Joker, tells him that Gordon has remained sane, and concludes that Joker is alone in his madness. He then attempts to reach out to him, offering rehabilitation. Joker apologetically declines, saying it is too late for him. He then says that the situation reminds him of a joke about two patients in an insane asylum who try to escape by leaping over a gap to an adjacent building. The first patient makes it across, but the second patient is afraid that he will fall. The first patient gets an idea: "Hey, I got this flashlight with me. I'll just shine it across the gap between the buildings and you can walk across the beam and join me." The second patient questions the idea: "What do you think I am, crazy? You'll just turn it off when I'm halfway across!" Initially stoic, Batman soon joins Joker in sharing laughter at the joke. The police soon arrive and the Joker's laugh trails off while Batman continues laughing.

In a mid-credits scene, Barbara, having retired as Batgirl due to her past encounters and paralysis, is shown using a wheelchair and taking on the mantle of Oracle while preparing to go "back to work".

== Cast ==
- Kevin Conroy as Bruce Wayne / Batman
- Mark Hamill as Joker / Red Hood
- Tara Strong as Barbara Gordon / Batgirl / Oracle
- Ray Wise as Commissioner James Gordon
- Robin Atkin Downes as Det. Harvey Bullock
- John DiMaggio as Carlos Francesco
- Brian George as Alfred Pennyworth
- JP Karliak as Reese
- Andrew Kishino as Murray
- Nolan North as Mitch
- Maury Sterling as Parry Francesco / Paris Franz
- Fred Tatasciore as Carnival Owner
- Bruce Timm as Patrolman
- Anna Vocino as Jeannie
- Kari Wahlgren as Call Girl
- Rick D. Wasserman as Sal Maroni

== Production ==
In 2011, during San Diego Comic-Con, actor Mark Hamill, who wanted to quit playing the Joker at that time, stated that he would be willing to voice him for an adaptation of The Killing Joke. He encouraged fans to campaign for said adaptation, most notably in a tweet on October 24, 2011. Following his tweet, a Facebook page titled "Petition to get Mark Hamill to play the Joker in animated Killing Joke" was set up by his fans. In 2013, Bruce Timm also expressed a desire to create the project, saying it was only a possibility. On July 10, 2015, during the Justice League: Gods and Monsters panel at San Diego Comic-Con, Timm announced that an animated film based on the novel was in development and slated to be released in 2016. Sam Liu would direct and Timm would executive produce the film. On July 17, Hamill tweeted that he had his "fingers crossed" in hopes that he would be contacted to reprise his role as the Joker. On July 27, Collider reported that Hamill would voice the Joker in the film and ComicBook.com spoke with Kevin Conroy, who stated he would reprise his voice role as Bruce Wayne / Batman "in a heartbeat". On March 14, 2016, it was officially announced that Conroy, Hamill, and Tara Strong would reprise their roles as Batman, Joker, and Barbara Gordon, and Ray Wise would voice Commissioner Gordon. The rest of the voice cast was revealed on Apple's iTunes digital release of the film.

In January 2016, Timm revealed that the film would be screened at San Diego Comic-Con in July. He added that the team had to "add a lot more story" for the film due to the source novel not being long enough to make a feature-length film. One month later, concept artist Phil Bourassa revealed that in 2009, Timm was slated to produce an R-rated version of The Killing Joke, but development on the film was stalled after two weeks due to the under-performance of Watchmen. In April, Warner Home Video confirmed that The Killing Joke would be the first film in the DC Universe Animated Original Movies series and the first Batman film to receive an R rating from the MPAA, with Warner Bros. Animation and Warner Digital Series president Sam Register explaining, "From the start of production, we encouraged producer Bruce Timm and our team at Warner Bros. Animation to remain faithful to the original story—regardless of the eventual MPAA rating... We felt it was our responsibility to present our core audience—the comics-loving community—with an animated film that authentically represented the tale they know all too well."

In terms of animation production, the crew admitted that trying to adapt Bolland's art style was challenging due to the realistic quality. They then sought out another artist with a simpler yet similar style that would be easier to animate, settling on Kevin Nowlan. The animation itself was done by The Answer Studio, an outsourced studio in Japan.

== Release ==
Warner Home Video hosted the world premiere of The Killing Joke during the 2016 San Diego Comic-Con on July 22, 2016. The film was released digitally on July 26, 2016, while the deluxe edition and combo pack Blu-ray of the film was released on August 2, 2016. On June 8, 2016, Fathom Events and Vue cinemas announced they would release the film in select theaters for one night only on July 25, 2016, throughout the US and the UK. On July 18, 2016, Fathom Events announced that the film would receive an additional two showings on July 26 due to "unprecedented demand." It also received a limited release in Australia, New Zealand and Mexico on July 24, 2016.

Batman: The Killing Joke grossed $3.8 million in the United States and Canada and $586,038 in other countries, for a total gross of $4.4 million. In the US, the film grossed $3.2 million on the first night of the Fathom Events screenings and became the biggest theatrical event in Fathom's history. The film earned $2,910,693 from domestic DVD sales and $5,743,188 from domestic Blu-ray sales, bringing its total domestic home video earnings to $8,653,881.

== Reception ==
On Rotten Tomatoes, the film has an approval rating of 35% based on 46 reviews, with an average rating of 5.7/10. The site's critics' consensus reads: "This stilted retelling of the Joker's origin adds little to its iconic source material, further diminished by some questionable story additions that will have fans demanding justice for Barbara Gordon."

Many critics note the first half of the film strays from source material and feels disjointed from the second half. Ben Travers of IndieWire commented that "instead of humanizing her, [the prologue] turns Barbara/Batgirl into a comic book cliché: the female character that feigns complexity, but, when given an expanded role, is only viewed through a sexual lens." Tommy Cook of Collider wrote that, "The prologue never quite gels with the rest of the film. It feels tacked on like a short before the actual feature." Jesse Schedeen of IGN remarks, "The creep factor comes from the fact that Batgirl has such a clearly subordinate relationship to Batman. He's the seasoned veteran and mentor. She's the newbie pupil. That Batman would take advantage of that relationship reflects very poorly on him as a superhero... Batgirl still comes across as a sacrificial lamb in the end. Her insipid romantic drama adds no weight to her eventual trauma."

In response to criticism of the prologue, Azzarello stated, "The thing about this is that it's controversial, so we added more controversy." Bruce Timm further added:

We were aware that it's a little risky. There's definitely some stuff in that first part of the movie that's going to be controversial. Here's where we came down on that specific issue: it was really important to us to show that both of the characters make some pretty big mistakes. I mean, his "parental skills" aren't that great. Maybe never having had any kids of his own, he doesn't realize that if you tell a kid to not do something, they're going to want to do it even more. And then she makes some mistakes and then he kind of overreacts to her mistakes and then she overreacts to his overreaction. So it's very human; it's a very understandable story. It's tricky because it's messy, because relationships are sometimes messy. But to me and to Alan and Brian, it was all very fascinating to us to explore that angle.

The film's second half was received more positively for its voice acting and faithfulness to the source material. Nick Bosworth of JoBlo.com wrote that "the best strength of this film however hands down in the voice talent behind it. Kevin Conroy is in top form returning as Bruce Wayne … and of course Mark Hamill as Joker."

Gavia Baker-Whitelaw of The Daily Dot wrote of the film's art and animation: "Each scene is recreated with painstaking accuracy, but DC's animation style does not measure up to the impact of Brian Bolland's 1980s noir aesthetic."
