= Alan Burnett =

American television producer

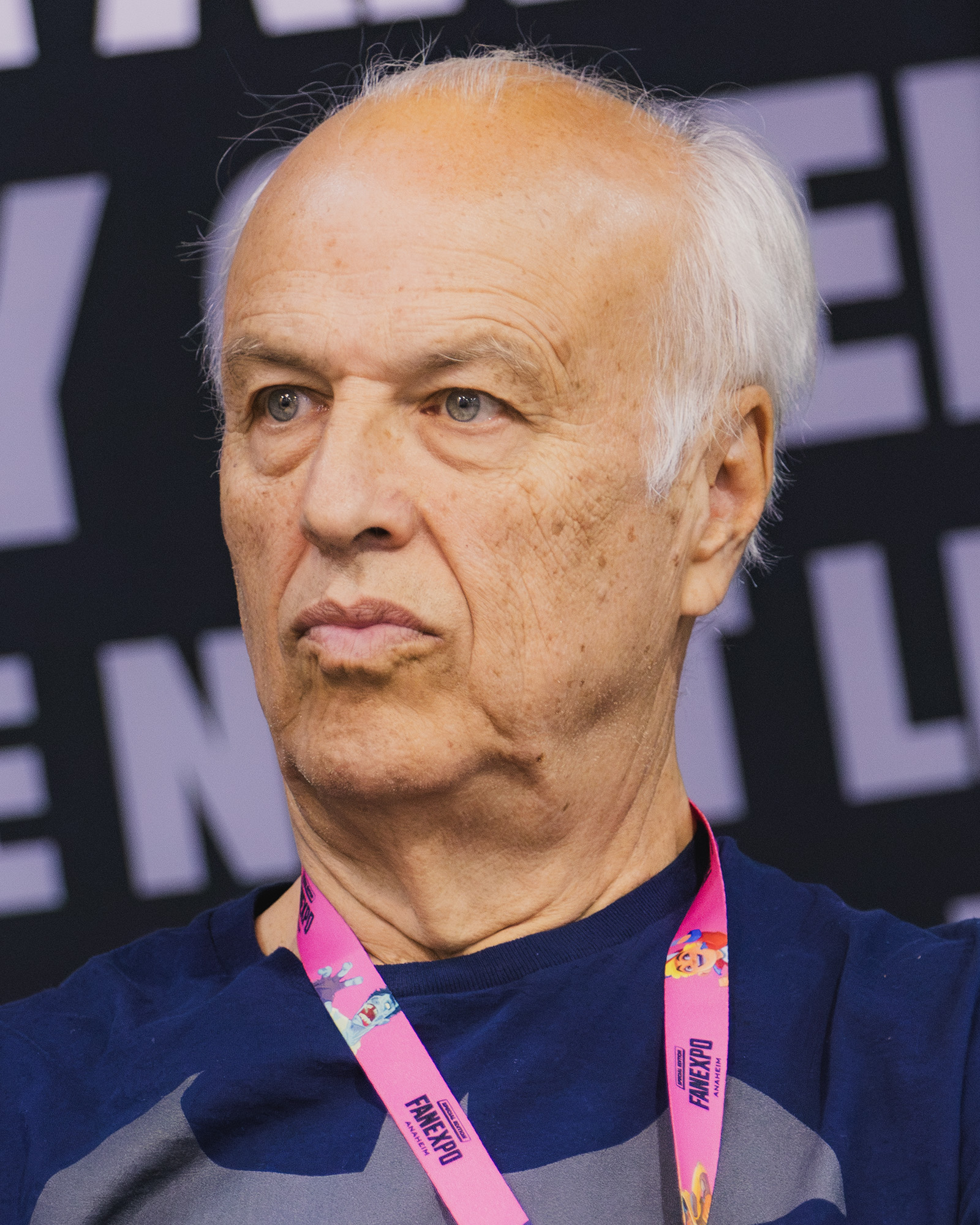
- Burnett in 2026
- Born: February 17, 1950 (age 76); Cleveland, Ohio
- Education: University of Florida; University of Southern California
- Occupations: Producer, writer
- Years active: 1982–present
- Awards: Inkpot Award (2017)

Alan Burnett (/bɜːrˈnɛt/; born February 17, 1950 in Cleveland, Ohio) is an American television writer-producer particularly associated with Warner Bros. Animation, Hanna-Barbera Productions, DC Comics, and Disney Television Animation.

He has had a hand in virtually every DC animated project since the waning years of the Super Friends. Burnett's contributions for Disney were largely a part of the 1990s Disney Afternoon, where he was attached to the Disney's Adventures of the Gummi Bears and various projects set in the Scrooge McDuck universe. Because of his primary focus on televised animation, he has occasionally been involved in film projects related to a parent television program. He is a graduate of the University of Florida and has an MFA in film production from the University of Southern California.

== Filmography ==
=== Film ===
Year	Title	Contribution		Notes
Year	Title	Writer	Producer	Notes
1990	DuckTales the Movie: Treasure of the Lost Lamp	Yes	No	Animation screenplay
1993	Batman: Mask of the Phantasm	Yes	Yes	Screenplay (story by); Co-producer
2000	Batman Beyond: Return of the Joker	Yes	Yes	Direct-to-video; Writer/producer
2003	Chase Me	Yes	Yes	Short film Writer/supervising producer
2003	Batman: Mystery of the Batwoman	Yes	Yes	Direct-to-video; Story by/supervising producer
2005	The Batman vs. Dracula	No	Yes	Direct-to-video; Executive producer
2008	Batman: Gotham Knight	Yes	No	Direct-to-video; Writer
2009	Green Lantern: First Flight	Yes	Yes	Direct-to-video; Writer/co-producer
2009	Superman/Batman: Public Enemies	No	Yes	Direct-to-video co-producer
2010	Scooby-Doo! Abracadabra-Doo	Yes	Yes	Direct-to-video; Writer/co-producer
2010	The Spectre	No	Yes	Short film Co-producer
2010	Justice League: Crisis on Two Earths	No	Yes	Direct-to-video; Co-producer
2010	DC Showcase: Jonah Hex	No	Yes	Short film Co-producer
2010	Batman: Under the Red Hood	No	Yes	Direct-to-video; Co-producer
2010	Tom and Jerry Meet Sherlock Holmes	No	Yes	Direct-to-video; Co-producer
2010	Scooby-Doo! Camp Scare	No	Yes	Direct-to-video; Co-producer
2010	Superman/Batman: Apocalypse	No	Yes	Direct-to-video; Co-producer
2010	Green Arrow	No	Yes	Short film Co-producer
2010	Superman/Shazam!: The Return of Black Adam	No	Yes	Short film Co-producer
2010	DC Showcase Original Shorts Collection	No	Yes	Direct-to-video; Co-producer
2011	All-Star Superman	No	Yes	Direct-to-video; Co-producer
2011	Green Lantern: Emerald Knights	Yes	Yes	Direct-to-video; Writer/co-producer
2011	Tom and Jerry & The Wizard of OZ	No	Yes	Direct-to-video; Co-producer
2011	Scooby-Doo! Legend of the Phantosaur	No	Yes	Direct-to-video; Co-producer
2011	Batman: Year One	No	Yes	Direct-to-video; Co-producer
2011	Catwoman	No	Yes	Short film Co-producer
2012	Justice League: Doom	No	Yes	Direct-to-video; Co-producer
2012	Scooby-Doo! Music of the Vampire	No	Yes	Direct-to-video; Co-producer
2012	Superman vs. The Elite	No	Yes	Direct-to-video; Co-producer
2012	Scooby-Doo! Spooky Games	No	Yes	Direct-to-video; Co-producer
2012	Batman: The Dark Knight Returns, Part 1	No	Yes	Direct-to-video; Co-producer
2012	Tom and Jerry: Robin Hood and His Merry Mouse	No	Yes	Direct-to-video; Co-producer
2012	Big Top Scooby-Doo!	No	Yes	Direct-to-video; Co-producer
2012	Scooby-Doo! Haunted Holidays	No	Yes	Short film Co-producer
2012	Scooby-Doo! Mask of the Blue Falcon	No	Yes	Direct-to-video; Co-producer
2013	Batman: The Dark Knight Returns, Part 2	No	Yes	Direct-to-video; Co-producer
2013	Superman; Unbound	No	Yes	Direct-to-video; Co-producer
2013	The Justice League: The Flashpoint Paradox	No	Yes	Direct-to-video; Co-producer
2013	Scooby-Doo! Stage Fright	No	Yes	Direct-to-video; Co-producer
2013	Scooby-Doo! Spooky Scarecrow	No	Yes	Direct-to-video; Co-producer
2013	Scooby-Doo! Mencha Mutt Menace	No	Yes	Direct-to-video; Co-producer
2014	Justice League: War	No	Yes	Direct-to-video; Co-producer
2014	Scooby-Doo! WrestleMania Mystery	No	Yes	Direct-to-video; Co-producer
2014	Son of Batman	No	Yes	Direct-to-video; Co-producer
2014	Scooby-Doo! Ghastly Goals	No	Yes	Direct-to-video; Co-producer
2014	Batman: Assault on Arkham	No	Yes	Direct-to-video; Co-producer
2014	Tom and Jerry: The Lost Dragon	No	Yes	Direct-to-video; Co-producer
2014	Scooby-Doo! Frankencreepy	No	Yes	Direct-to-video; Co-producer
2015	Justice League: Throne of Atlantis	No	Yes	Direct-to-video; Co-producer
2015	Scooby-Doo! Moon Monster Madness	No	Yes	Direct-to-video; Co-producer
2015	The Flintstones & WWE: Stone Age Smackdown	No	Yes	Direct-to-video; Co-producer
2015	Batman vs. Robin	No	Yes	Direct-to-video; Co-producer
2015	Scooby-Doo and the Beach Beastie	No	Yes	Short film Co-producer
2015	Tom and Jerry: Spy Quest	No	Yes	Direct-to-video; Co-producer
2015	Scooby-Doo! And Kiss: Rock and Roll Mystery	No	Yes	Direct-to-video; Co-producer
2015	Justice League: Gods and Monsters	Yes	Yes	Direct-to-video; Writer/co-producer
2016	Batman: Bad Blood	No	Yes	Direct-to-video; Writer/co-producer
2016	Justice League vs. Teen Titans	Yes	Yes	Direct-to-video; Writer/co-producer
2016	Lego Scooby-Doo!: Haunted Hollywood	No	Yes	Direct-to-video; Co-producer
2016	Tom & Jerry: Back to Oz	No	Yes	Direct-to-video; Co-producer
2016	Batman: The Killing Joke	No	Yes	Direct-to-video; Co-producer
2016	Scooby-Doo! and WWE: Curse of the Speed Demon	No	Yes	Direct-to-video; Co-producer
2017	Justice League Dark	No	Yes	Direct-to-video; Co-producer
2017	Scooby-Doo! Shaggy's Showdown	No	Yes	Direct-to-video; Co-producer
2017	Teen Titans: The Judas Contract	No	Yes	Direct-to-video; Co-producer
2017	Tom and Jerry: Will Wonka and the Chocolate Factory	No	Yes	Direct-to-video; Co-producer
2017	Batman and Harley Quinn	No	Yes	Direct-to-video; Co-producer
2017	Batman vs. Two-Face	No	Yes	Direct-to-video; Co-producer
2018	Batman: Gotham by Gaslight	No	Yes	Direct-to-video; Co-producer
2018	Suicide Squad: Hell to Pay	Yes	Yes	Direct-to-video; Writer/co-producer
2018	The Death of Superman	No	Yes	Direct-to-video; Co-producer
2019	Reign of the Supermen	No	Yes	Direct-to-video; Co-producer
2019	Justice League vs. the Fatal Five	Yes	Yes	Direct-to-video; Writer/co-producer
2019	Batman: Hush	No	Yes	Direct-to-video co-producer

=== Television ===
Year	Title	Contribution		Notes
Year	Title	Writer	Producer	Notes
1982–1987	The Smurfs	Yes	No	60 episodes
1983	The New Scooby and Scrappy-Doo Show	Yes	No	Episode: "The Creature Came from Chem Lab" (story by)
1983	Shirt Tales	Yes	No	2 episodes
1983	The Biskitts	Yes	No	13 episodes
1984	Super Friends: The Legendary Super Powers Show	Yes	No	2 episodes
1984–1985	Challenge of the GoBots	Yes	No	6 episodes
1985	Snorks	Yes	No	3 episodes
1985	The Super Powers Team: Galactic Guardians	Yes	No	6 episodes
1985	The Jetsons	Yes	No	Episode: "Boy George"
1985	Galtar and the Golden Lance	Yes	No	Episode: "Antara the Terrible"
1986	Jonny Quest	Yes	No	Episode: "Peril of the Reptilian"
1988	Adventures of the Gummi Bears	Yes	No	3 episodes
1989–1990	DuckTales	Yes	Yes	Writer of 8 episodes Co-producer of 4 episodes
1990	Chip 'n' Dale Rescue Rangers	Yes	No	Episode: "A Fly in the Ointment"
1990	TaleSpin	Yes	No	2 episodes
1992–1995	Batman: The Animated Series	Yes	Yes	Writer of 11 episodes (story by/story editor); Producer of 85 episodes
1995–1996	Freakazoid!	Yes	No	Episodes: "Dexter's Date" and "Freakazoid Is History!"
1996–2000	Superman: The Animated Series	Yes	Yes	Writer of 43 episodes Producer of 51 episodes
1997–1999	The New Batman Adventures	Yes	Yes	Creator/writer/producer of 24 episodes
1999–2001	Batman Beyond	Yes	Yes	Creator/producer of 52 episodes 37 episodes
2000–2004	Static Shock	Yes	Yes	Writer of 9 episodes Supervising producer of 52 episodes
2002–2004	Ozzy & Drix	Yes	Yes	Writer of 3 episodes Producer of 26 episodes
2001	The Zeta Project	No	Yes	Supervising producer
2004–2008	The Batman	Yes	Yes	Episode: "The Batman/Superman Story"; Executive producer of 65 episodes
2005	Firehouse Tales	No	Yes	Supervising producer
2005–2006	Krypto the Superdog	Yes	Yes	Writer, 4 episodes Supervising Producer of 39 episodes
2007	Friends and Heroes	Yes	No	Episode: "Horseplay"
2011	The 99	Yes	No	6 episodes
2011	Batman: The Brave and the Bold	Yes	No	Episode: "Bold Beginnings!"
2015	Justice League: Gods and Monsters Chronicles	Yes	Yes	Television miniseries Writer/producer of 3 episodes
2015	Lego Scooby-Doo! Knight Time Terror	No	Yes	Television short Co-producer
2016–2018	Justice League Action	No	Yes	Producer of 52 episodes
2017	Justice League Action Shorts	Yes	Yes	Television short Episode: "Something in the Hair"; Producer of 4 episodes

== Comic books ==
Comics work includes:

- Arkham Batman: Arkham Asylum: The Road to Arkham
- Batman: The Adventures Continue #1–17 [digital], #1–8 [print] (2020–2021)
- Batman: The Adventures Continue Season Two #1–7 (2021–2022)
- Justice League of America (Vol 2) #16-19
- Superman/Batman #37-42
- The Flash (Vol 2) #244-247

== Awards and nominations ==
The following is a list of accolades received by Burnett.

Year	Title	Accolade	Category	Result
1987	The Smurfs	Humanitas Prize Award	Children's Animation Category (shared with John Loy)	Won
1988	The Smurfs	Daytime Emmy Award	Outstanding Animated Program	Nominated
1991	TaleSpin: Plunder & Lightning	Primetime Emmy Award	Outstanding Animated Program (for Programming More Than One Hour)	Won
1993	Batman: The Animated Series	Daytime Emmy Award	Outstanding Animated Program	Nominated
1993	Batman: The Animated Series: Robin's Reckoning: Part 1	Primetime Emmy Award	Outstanding Animated Program (for Programming One Hour or Less)	Won
1994	Batman: The Animated Series	Daytime Emmy Award	Outstanding Animated Children's Program	Nominated
1994	Batman: The Animated Series	Daytime Emmy Award	Outstanding Writing in an Animated Program	Nominated
1997	Superman	Daytime Emmy Award	Outstanding Special Class Animated Program	Nominated
1998	The New Batman Adventures	Daytime Emmy Award	Outstanding Special Class Animated Program	Won
1998	Superman	Daytime Emmy Award	Outstanding Special Class Animated Program	Won
1999	Batman Beyond	Annie Award	Outstanding Individual Achievement for Writing in an Animated TV Series (shared with Paul Dini) for episode ("Rebirth Part 1")	Nominated
1999	The New Batman Adventures	Daytime Emmy Award	Outstanding Special Class Animated Program	Nominated
1999	Superman	Daytime Emmy Award	Outstanding Special Class Animated Program	Nominated
2000	The New Batman Adventures	Daytime Emmy Award	Outstanding Special Class Animated Program	Nominated
2000	Superman	Daytime Emmy Award	Outstanding Special Class Animated Program	Nominated
2000	Batman Beyond	Daytime Emmy Award	Outstanding Special Class Animated Program	Nominated
2001	Batman Beyond	Daytime Emmy Award	Outstanding Special Class Animated Program	Won
2001	Batman Beyond: Return of the Joker	DVD Exclusive Award	Best Animated Video Premiere	Nominated
2001	—N/a	Writers Guild Award	Animation Writers Caucus Animation Award	Won
2002	Batman Beyond	Daytime Emmy Award	Outstanding Special Class Animated Program	Nominated
2003	Static Shock	Daytime Emmy Award	Outstanding Special Class Animated Program	Nominated
2003	Ozzy & Drix	Daytime Emmy Award	Outstanding Special Class Animated Program	Nominated
2003	Static Shock	Humanitas Prize Award	Children's Animation Category (shared with Dwayne McDuffie) for episode ("Jimmy")	Won
2004	Static Shock	Daytime Emmy Award	Outstanding Special Class Animated Program	Nominated
2004	Ozzy & Drix	Daytime Emmy Award	Outstanding Special Class Animated Program	Nominated
2005	The Batman	Daytime Emmy Award	Outstanding Special Class Animated Program	Nominated
2006	The Batman	Daytime Emmy Award	Outstanding Special Class Animated Program	Won
2007	The Batman	Daytime Emmy Award	Outstanding Special Class Animated Program	Nominated
2008	The Batman	Daytime Emmy Award	Outstanding Special Class Animated Program	Nominated
