= Andrea Romano (voice director) =

American retired voice director and casting director (born 1955)

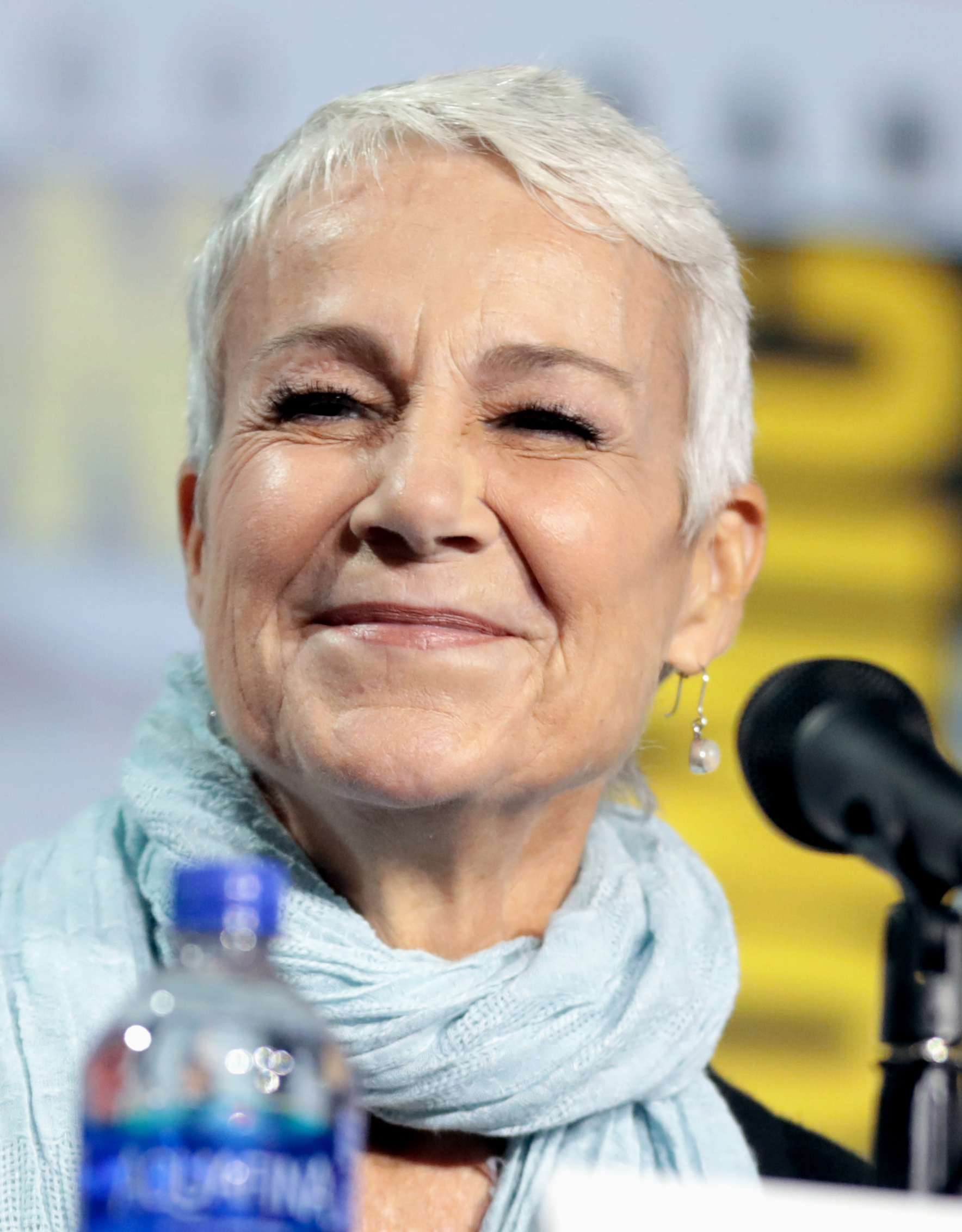
- Romano at the 2019 San Diego Comic-Con
- Born: December 3, 1955 (age 70); Long Island, New York, U.S.
- Occupations: Casting director, voice director, voice actress
- Years active: 1979–2020
- Spouse: Rogério Nogueira

Andrea Romano (born December 3, 1955) is an American retired casting director, voice director, and voice actress whose work includes Batman: The Animated Series, Animaniacs, Tiny Toon Adventures, Teen Titans, Avatar: The Last Airbender, The Legend of Korra, The Boondocks, Static Shock, Justice League, Justice League Unlimited, Batman Beyond, Ben 10: Ultimate Alien, Freakazoid!, Pinky and the Brain, Bonkers,Teenage Mutant Ninja Turtles, SpongeBob SquarePants and multiple Warner Bros. Animation/DC Comics direct-to-video films, including Wonder Woman and Green Lantern: First Flight. Her voice acting consisted of minor roles in television series, direct-to-video films, and video games.

== Early life ==
Romano was born on December 3, 1955, and grew up in Long Island, New York. Her father is of Italian descent and her mother is of Austrian-Jewish and Swedish descent. She received her bachelor's from State University of New York at Fredonia, graduating in 1977, before starting a master's at Rutgers University. She dropped out before finishing. At this time, she began auditioning for plays in Manhattan. While keeping a steady job during the day, Romano would perform in plays at night, often auditioning on her lunch break.

== Early career ==
In 1979, Romano moved to San Diego, where it was difficult for her to find theater work. After working in a couple of plays, she was offered a temporary position at Abrams-Rubaloff, a talent agency in Los Angeles. Within months, due to the temporary position lasting longer than expected, Romano was franchised as an agent.

After leaving Abrams-Rubaloff, Romano joined Special Artists, a smaller agency, and began their voice-over department. While at Special Artists, she would also direct the potential client auditions. It was during her time at Special Artists that Romano began attending some of her clients' recording sessions at Hanna–Barbera. After a short time at Special Artists, she was asked to audition at Hanna–Barbera for the position of casting director.

== Hanna-Barbera ==
Romano joined Hanna-Barbera in 1984. While at Hanna-Barbera, a position which she served for more than five years, Romano worked on such programs as The Smurfs, The New Adventures of Jonny Quest, Pound Puppies, and the 1985 revival of The Jetsons, among others. On all of which, she worked alongside director Gordon Hunt. She also worked on Jetsons: The Movie, though she had her name removed from the credits when an executive decision resulted in Janet Waldo's already-recorded work being discarded in favor of Tiffany. Near the end of recording for Jetsons: The Movie, Romano witnessed George O'Hanlon, who voiced George Jetson, suffer a fatal stroke in the recording studio. His wife was at his side.

Romano was approached by Disney, which was developing DuckTales at the time, to audition for the position of voice director of the series. Disney was auditioning five directors that would each direct one episode, after which, they would choose a director to direct the remaining episodes. One director did the first episode, then Romano directed the second episode; it was at this time that Disney chose to stop the audition process and have Romano direct the remaining episodes. Romano directed 61 episodes of DuckTales. While serving as voice director of DuckTales, for Disney, Romano remained on staff at Hanna-Barbera, as casting director until some of the Hanna-Barbera executives chose to leave and form a new company. Knowing she would not be able to direct in this new company, Romano chose to become a freelance director.

== Freelance directing ==
=== 1989–2000 ===
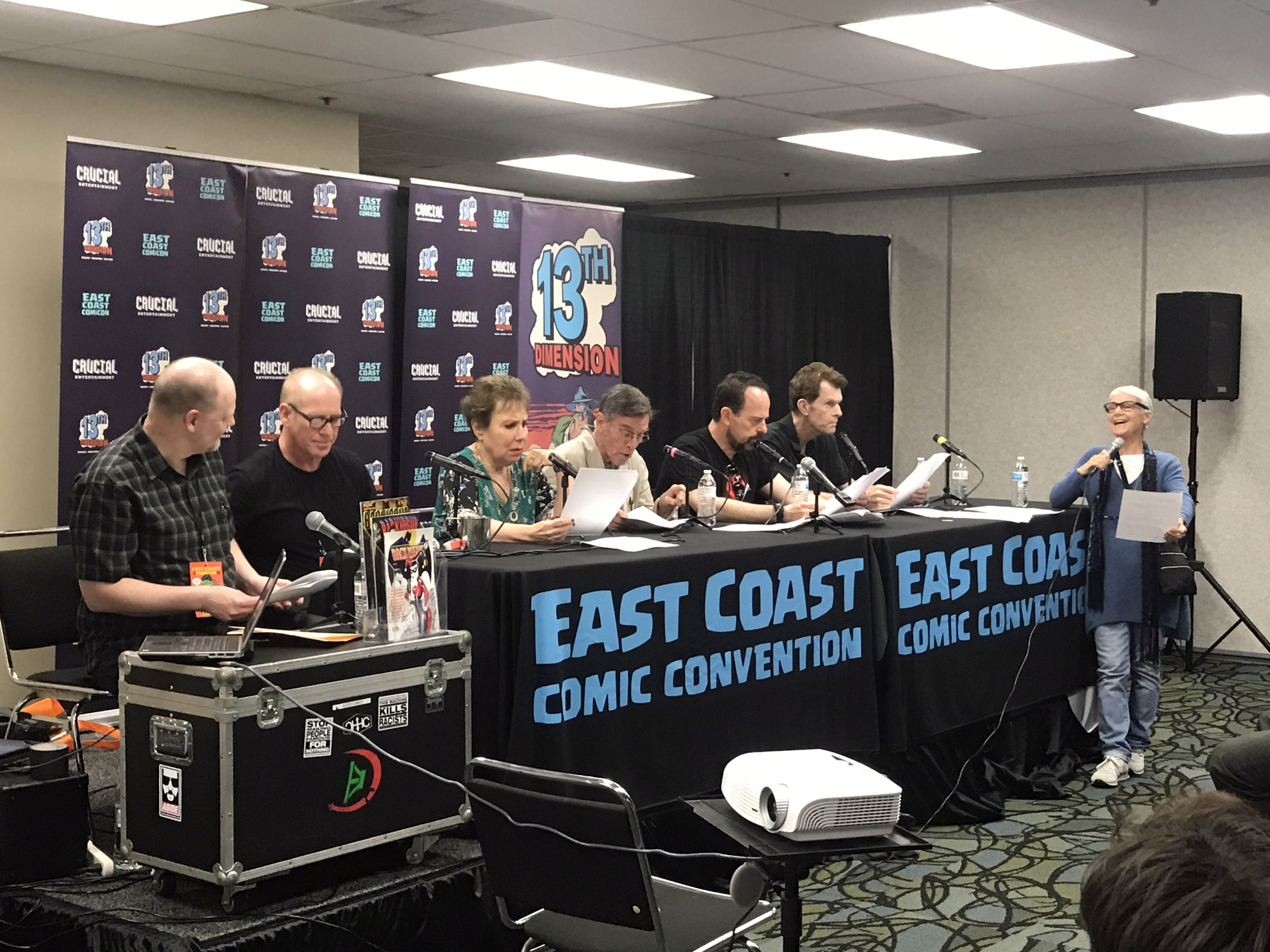
Romano, at right, directing the voice cast of Batman: The Animated Series in a table reading at the 2019 East Coast Comicon

Romano became a freelance casting and voice director in 1989. The first series she worked for, which was made for Warner Brothers, was Tiny Toon Adventures in 1990. That was followed by Batman: The Animated Series and The Plucky Duck Show in 1992; Animaniacs in 1993; Pinky and the Brain, The Sylvester & Tweety Mysteries and Freakazoid in 1995; Superman: The Animated Series and Road Rovers in 1996; The New Batman Adventures in 1997; Histeria! and Pinky, Elmyra & the Brain in 1998; and Batman Beyond in 1999; all for Warner Bros. She was also a voice director briefly for Bonkers in 1994. At the same time, Romano directed the first season of the first ever all-CGI series, ReBoot, however the position was taken over by Michael Donovan for the remainder of the show.

In addition to series, Romano also voice directed many direct-to-video films, including: Tiny Toon Adventures: How I Spent My Vacation, The Land Before Time II, The Land Before Time III, The Land Before Time IV, The Land Before Time V, and Wakko's Wish.

=== 2000–2020 ===
From 2000 to 2020, Romano served as casting, and voice director for series, including; Justice League, Teen Titans, Avatar: The Last Airbender, The Batman, SpongeBob SquarePants, Ben 10: Alien Force, and Batman: The Brave and the Bold.

She also did the DC Comics direct-to-video films, including: Superman: Doomsday, Justice League: The New Frontier, Batman: Gotham Knight, Wonder Woman, Green Lantern: First Flight, Justice League: Crisis on Two Earths, Batman: Under the Red Hood, and Batman: Year One.

=== Video games ===
On video games, Romano has stated, "On video games I only do special ones because video games tend to become recording 150 different 'oofs,' 20 different strangulation sounds... they aren't challenging to me and they are taxing on an actor's voice." Romano did her first voice direction of a video game on 1999's Descent 3. She later worked on Animaniacs Splat Ball, in 1999; Floigan Bros. and Batman: Vengeance, in 2001; Teen Titans, in 2006; Diablo III, in 2008; and Batman: The Brave and the Bold – The Videogame and StarCraft II: Wings of Liberty, in 2010.

== Voice acting ==
Romano's first credited voice role was in a 1992 episode of Tiny Toon Adventures. Later, she again voiced herself on a 1996 episode of Animaniacs. She has also voice-acted for the series Justice League and Teen Titans. In addition to these, Romano also played voice-roles for some of her direct-to-video films: Batman Beyond: Return of the Joker, Batman: Mystery of the Batwoman, Batman: Gotham Knight, Superman/Batman: Public Enemies, Justice League: Crisis on Two Earths, and Superman/Batman: Apocalypse. She also voiced the Batcomputer in the 2010 video game, Batman: The Brave and the Bold – The Videogame.

== Casting process and reputation ==
Romano is "renowned for considering 250-300 actors for lead roles", according to UGO. She dislikes having to replace actors, which is why she values actors who are not celebrities, having commented, "Replacing a celebrity ... that's really uncomfortable." Romano has joked that fans can sometimes tell what she has been watching on television or in the films by whom she casts. She sometimes intentionally casts the same actors with whom she has worked previously, "because it was fun, it was good and I know they can do the job." Romano is known for having recording sessions with the actors recording lines in one room, rather than recording the actors' lines individually. She has been known for casting more famous names alongside veteran voice actors, most notably casting Mark Hamill (Luke Skywalker in Star Wars) as The Joker in Batman: The Animated Series (giving Hamill a new career as a voice actor), and regularly casts other famous guests on her shows, including Neil Patrick Harris, Weird Al Yankovic, William H. Macy, Paul Reubens, Shaquille O'Neal, James Hong, Dakota Fanning and Bernadette Peters on various shows, as well as Senator Patrick Leahy (a lifelong Batman fan) on Batman: The Animated Series, among other famous guests.

Her reputation includes Wired's Ken Denmead's description of Romano as an "iconic voice director". UGO refers to her as "arguably the best known casting/dialogue director on the animation scene today."

Wil Wheaton, an actor and voice actor whom Romano has worked with, has said: "I owe Andrea my whole animation career", after she cast him in The Zeta Project and Teen Titans.

== Retirement and post-career plans ==
Late in 2016, Romano announced that she would retire at the age of 65, which she reached in December 2020, and move to Brazil with her husband, who is from that country. She told The Dot and Line that she was training another woman to succeed her as voice director for the Warner Bros. Animation stable of actors, but would not identify her successor until she considered the person ready.

== Filmography ==
=== Crew work ===
Crew work in television
| Year | Title | Notes |
|---|---|---|
| 1984–1985 | Challenge of the GoBots | Casting director |
| 1984–1984 | Pink Panther and Sons | Casting director |
| 1984–1989 | The Snorks | Casting director |
| 1984–1989 | The Smurfs | Casting director (Seasons 4–9) |
| 1985 | ABC Weekend Specials | Casting director (1 episode) |
| 1985 | CBS Storybreak | Casting director (11 episodes) |
| 1985 | The 13 Ghosts of Scooby-Doo | Casting director |
| 1985 | The Super Powers Team: Galactic Guardians | Casting director |
| 1985–1986 | Galtar and the Golden Lance | Casting director |
| 1985–1986 | Paw Paws | Casting director |
| 1985–1988 | Yogi's Treasure Hunt | Casting director |
| 1985–1988 | The Greatest Adventure: Stories from the Bible | Casting director |
| 1985–1987 | The Jetsons | Casting director (1980's revival of the original show) |
| 1986 | Wildfire | Casting director |
| 1986 | The Flintstones' 25th Anniversary Celebration | Casting director Animated television special |
| 1986–1987 | Pound Puppies | Casting director |
| 1986–1987 | The New Adventures of Jonny Quest | Casting director |
| 1986–1987 | Foofur | Casting director |
| 1986–1987 | The Flintstone Kids | Casting director |
| 1987 | Sky Commanders | Casting director |
| 1987 | Yogi's Great Escape | Casting director |
| 1987 | The Jetsons Meet the Flintstones | Casting director |
| 1987 | Scooby-Doo Meets the Boo Brothers | Casting director |
| 1987 | Top Cat and the Beverly Hills Cats | Casting director |
| 1987 | Rockin' with Judy Jetson | Casting director |
| 1987 | Yogi Bear and the Magical Flight of the Spruce Goose | Casting director |
| 1987 | Popeye and Son | Casting director |
| 1987–1990 | DuckTales | Dialogue director (50 episodes) (Season 1); Voice director (11 episodes) |
| 1988 | The Completely Mental Misadventures of Ed Grimley | Casting director |
| 1988 | The New Yogi Bear Show | Casting director |
| 1988 | Scooby-Doo and the Ghoul School | Casting director |
| 1988 | The Good, the Bad, and Huckleberry Hound | Casting director |
| 1988 | Yogi and the Invasion of the Space Bears | Casting director |
| 1988 | Scooby-Doo and the Reluctant Werewolf | Casting director |
| 1988–1990 | A Pup Named Scooby-Doo | Casting director |
| 1988–1990 | Fantastic Max | Casting director |
| 1989 | The Further Adventures of Super Ted | Casting director |
| 1989 | Hanna-Barbera's 50th: A Yabba Dabba Doo Celebration | animation Casting director Animated television special |
| 1989 | Hägar the Horrible | Casting director Animated television special |
| 1989-1990 | Paddington Bear | Casting director |
| 1989-1990 | Chip 'n Dale Rescue Rangers | Voice director (17 episodes) |
| 1990–1995 | Tiny Toon Adventures | Casting director Voice director |
| 1991 | The New Adventures of Winnie the Pooh | Voice director (7 episodes) |
| 1992–1995 | Batman: The Animated Series | Casting director Voice director |
| 1992 | The Plucky Duck Show | Casting director Voice director |
| 1993 | Cro | Voice director (13 episodes) |
| 1993 | Bonkers | Dialogue director (19 episodes); Voice director (1 episodes) |
| 1993–1998 | Animaniacs | Casting director Voice director |
| 1994 | ReBoot | Voice director (9 episodes) |
| 1995–1997 | Freakazoid! | Voice director |
| 1995–1998 | Pinky and the Brain | Casting director Voice director |
| 1995–2000 | The Sylvester & Tweety Mysteries | Voice director |
| 1996–2000 | Superman: The Animated Series | Voice director |
| 1996–1997 | Road Rovers | Voice director |
| 1997–1999 | The New Batman Adventures | Casting director Voice director |
| 1998–1999 | Pinky, Elmyra & the Brain | Original Casting director Voice director |
| 1998–2000 | Histeria! | Voice director |
| 1999–2001 | Batman Beyond | Voice director |
| 2000–2004 | Static Shock | Casting director (seasons 2–4); Voice director |
| 2001 | Tom and Jerry: The Mansion Cat | Casting director Recording director |
| 2001–2002 | The Zeta Project | Voice director |
| 2001–2003 | Sitting Ducks | Voice director |
| 2001–2004 | Justice League | Casting director Voice director |
| 2003–2006 | Teen Titans | Casting director Voice director |
| 2004–2006 | Justice League Unlimited | Casting director Voice director |
| 2005–2008 | Avatar: The Last Airbender | Voice director |
| 2005–2009, 2014 | The Boondocks | Voice director |
| 2006–2008 | The Batman | Co-casting director alongside Ginny McSwain and Michael Hack (seasons 4–5) and voice director (seasons 4–5) |
| 2007–2008 | El Tigre: The Adventures of Manny Rivera | Voice director (23 episodes) |
| 2007–2012 | SpongeBob SquarePants | Voice director (78 episodes) |
| 2008–2010 | Ben 10: Alien Force | Casting Director; Recording Director |
| 2008–2011 | Batman: The Brave and the Bold | Casting director Voice Director |
| 2010–2012 | Ben 10: Ultimate Alien | Casting Director; Recording Director (2 episodes); Voice director (50 episodes) |
| 2011–2012 | ThunderCats | Casting director Voice director |
| 2012–2013 | Motorcity | Voice director |
| 2012–2014 | The Legend of Korra | Voice director |
| 2012–2017 | Teenage Mutant Ninja Turtles | Voice director |
| 2013–2014 | Beware the Batman | Casting director Voice director |
| 2013–2016 | Turbo FAST | Casting director Voice director |
| 2015–2018 | Niko and the Sword of Light | Casting Director (18 episodes); Voice Director (18 episodes) |
| 2015–2018 | The Adventures of Puss in Boots | Voice director |
| 2016–2018 | Voltron: Legendary Defender | Voice director (72 episodes) |
| 2016 | Little Big Awesome: What's the Trouble Bubble | Casting director Voice director |
| 2019 | Lucky | Voice director |

Crew work in film
| Year | Title | Notes |
|---|---|---|
| 1990 | DuckTales the Movie: Treasure of the Lost Lamp | Voice director |
| 1990 | Jetsons: The Movie | Assistant recording director |
| 1991 | The Little Engine That Could | Casting director |
| 1992 | Tiny Toon Adventures: How I Spent My Vacation | Casting director Voice director |
| 1993 | Batman: Mask of the Phantasm | Casting director Voice Supervision |
| 1994 | The Land Before Time II: The Great Valley Adventure | Casting director Voice director |
| 1995 | The Land Before Time III: The Time of the Great Giving | Casting director Voice director |
| 1996 | The Land Before Time IV: Journey Through the Mists | Casting director Voice director |
| 1997 | The Land Before Time V: The Mysterious Island | Casting director Voice director |
| 1998 | Batman & Mr. Freeze: SubZero | Casting director Voice director |
| 1999 | Wakko's Wish | Casting director Voice director |
| 2000 | Tweety's High-Flying Adventure | Voice director |
| 2000 | Batman Beyond: Return of the Joker | Voice director |
| 2001 | Barbie in the Nutcracker | Voice Director |
| 2002 | The Land Before Time IX: Journey to Big Water | adr voice director |
| 2003 | Batman: Mystery of the Batwoman | Casting director Voice director |
| 2006 | Teen Titans: Trouble in Tokyo | Casting director Voice director |
| 2006 | Bah, Humduck! A Looney Tunes Christmas | Casting director Voice director |
| 2007 | Superman: Doomsday | Casting director Voice director |
| 2007 | Tom and Jerry: A Nutcracker Tale | Voice director |
| 2008 | Justice League: The New Frontier | Voice director |
| 2008 | Batman: Gotham Knight | Casting director Voice director |
| 2009 | Wonder Woman | Casting director Voice director |
| 2009 | Green Lantern: First Flight | Casting director Voice director |
| 2009 | Superman/Batman: Public Enemies | Casting director Voice director |
| 2010 | Scooby-Doo! Abracadabra-Doo | Casting director Voice director |
| 2010 | Scooby-Doo! Camp Scare | Casting director Voice director |
| 2010 | Justice League: Crisis on Two Earths | Voice director |
| 2010 | Batman: Under the Red Hood | Casting director Voice director |
| 2010 | Superman/Batman: Apocalypse | Voice director |
| 2011 | All-Star Superman | Voice director |
| 2011 | Green Lantern: Emerald Knights | Voice director |
| 2011 | Scooby-Doo! Legend of the Phantosaur | Casting director Voice director |
| 2011 | Batman: Year One | Voice director |
| 2012 | Justice League: Doom | Voice director |
| 2012 | Scooby-Doo! Music of the Vampire | Casting director Voice director |
| 2012 | Batman: The Dark Knight Returns | Voice director |
| 2012 | Big Top Scooby-Doo! | Casting director Voice director |
| 2013 | Superman: Unbound | Voice director |
| 2013 | Justice League: The Flashpoint Paradox | Voice director |
| 2014 | Batman: Assault on Arkham | Voice director |
| 2014 | Son of Batman | Voice director |
| 2015 | Batman vs. Robin | Casting director Voice director |
| 2015 | Justice League: Gods and Monsters | Casting director Voice director |
| 2016 | Ratchet & Clank | Voice director |

Crew work in video games
| Year | Title | Notes |
|---|---|---|
| 1999 | Animaniacs Splat Ball | Voice director |
| 1999 | Descent 3 | Voice director |
| 2001 | Floigan Bros. | Voice director |
| 2001 | Batman: Vengeance | Voice director |
| 2006 | Teen Titans | Voice director |
| 2010 | StarCraft II: Wings of Liberty | Voice director |
| 2010 | Batman: The Brave and the Bold – The Videogame | Voice director |

=== Voice work ===
Voice roles
| Year | Title | Role | Notes |
|---|---|---|---|
| 1992 | Tiny Toon Adventures | Herself | Episode: "Toons Take Over" |
| 1994, 1996 | Animaniacs | Herself | 2 episodes |
| 2000 | Histeria! | Herself | 2 episodes |
| 2000 | Batman Beyond: Return of the Joker | Laughing Boy | Direct-to-video |
| 2001 | Floigan Bros. | Cute Kitten | Video game |
| 2002 | The Zeta Project | Adrian Dolan | Episode: "Lost and Found" |
| 2003 | Batman: Mystery of the Batwoman | Additional voices | Direct-to-video |
| 2003 | Teen Titans | H.I.V.E. Headmistress | Animated series; episode: "Final Exam" |
| 2008 | Batman: Gotham Knight | Martha Wayne | Direct-to-video |
| 2009 | Superman/Batman: Public Enemies | Giganta | Direct-to-video |
| 2009 | Wonder Woman | President's Aide | Direct-to-video |
| 2010 | Batman: Under the Red Hood | Reporter #1 | Direct-to-video |
| 2010 | Justice League: Crisis on Two Earths | Watchtower Computer | Direct-to-video |
| 2010 | Superman/Batman: Apocalypse | Stompa | Direct-to-video |
| 2010 | Batman: The Brave and the Bold – The Videogame | Batcomputer | Video game |
| 2011 | Justice League: Doom | Abin Sur's Ring | Direct-to-video |
| 2011 | Batman: Year One | Obstetrician | Direct-to-video |
| 2012 | Justice League: Doom | Batcomputer | Direct-to-video |
| 2012–2013 | Batman: The Dark Knight Returns | Woman | Two-part direct-to-video film |
| 2013 | I Know That Voice | Herself | Documentary |
| 2013 | Superman: Unbound | News Anchor | Direct-to-video |
| 2013 | Justice League: The Flashpoint Paradox | Doris | Direct-to-video |
| 2014 | Justice League: War | Green Lantern Ring | Direct-to-video |
| 2014 | Son of Batman | Suit #2 | Direct-to-video |
| 2014 | Teenage Mutant Ninja Turtles | Computer Voice | Episode: "The Kraang Conspiracy" |
| 2014 | The Legend of Korra | Innkeeper | Episode: "The Stakeout" |
| 2014 | Batman: Assault on Arkham | Woman | Direct-to-video |
| 2015 | Justice League: Throne of Atlantis | Elderly Atlantean Woman | Direct-to-video |
| 2015 | Batman vs. Robin | Jill | Direct-to-video |
| 2015 | Justice League: Gods and Monsters | Jean Palmer | Direct-to-video |
| 2016 | Voltron: Legendary Defender | Pidge's Helmet | Episode: "Reunion" |
