= Ethan Spaulding =

American animation director

- Born: Ethan Spaulding; United States
- Occupations: Animation director; producer; story board artist
- Years active: 1995–present
- Employer: Warner Bros. Animation
- Notable work: Avatar: The Last Airbender; ThunderCats; Son of Batman; Batman: Assault on Arkham; Justice League: Throne of Atlantis

Ethan Spaulding is an American animation director, producer and storyboard artist. He is well known for his work on the animated television series Avatar: The Last Airbender (2005–2008), directing 12 episodes and working as a storyboard artist on others. Following the conclusion of the series, he began working at Warner Bros. Animation, where he served as a producer of the animated reboot series ThunderCats (2011–2012). He has since directed films from the Scooby Doo!, Mortal Kombat, and DC Comics franchises, among others.

== Career ==
Spaulding spent a decade as a character layout artist on The Simpsons, starting in 1995. Following his work on the show, he was hired as a storyboard artist on the Nickelodeon animated series Avatar: The Last Airbender. He made his directorial debut with the season 2 episode “Return to Omashu”.

In 2011, Spaulding served as a producer for the Cartoon Network series ThunderCats, a reboot of the 1980s TV series of the same name. He directed three films in the DC Animated Movie Universe: Son of Batman and Batman: Assault on Arkham, both in 2014 (the latter of which he co-directed with Jay Oliva), and Justice League: Throne Of Atlantis in 2015. From 2017 to 2018, he directed the CW Seed web series Freedom Fighters: The Ray, which was later released as a feature film. He also directed the Lego films Lego Scooby-Doo! Blowout Beach Bash and Lego DC Comics Super Heroes: The Flash. In 2019, he co-directed the film Scooby-Doo! Return to Zombie Island alongside Cecilia Aranovich Hamilton.

Since 2020, Spaulding has directed three animated films based on the Mortal Kombat franchise: Mortal Kombat Legends: Scorpion's Revenge, Mortal Kombat Legends: Battle of the Realms, and Mortal Kombat Legends: Cage Match. He also produced the anime-inspired film Catwoman: Hunted in 2022.

In 2025, it was announced that Spaulding would executive produce the upcoming Avatar sequel series Avatar: Seven Havens.

== Filmography ==
=== Film ===
Year	Title	Director	Story Artist	Producer	Notes
2009	Wonder Woman	No	Yes	No	
2009	Green Lantern: First Flight	No	Yes	No	
2009	Superman/Batman: Public Enemies	No	Yes	No	
2009	Scooby-Doo! Abracadabra-Doo	No	Yes	No	
2010	Justice League: Crisis on Two Earths	No	Yes	No	
2010	Tom and Jerry Meet Sherlock Holmes	No	Yes	No	
2010	Scooby-Doo! Camp Scare	Yes	No	No	
2010	Superman/Shazam!: The Return of Black Adam	No	Yes	No	
2011	Scooby-Doo! Legend of the Phantosaur	Yes	No	No	
2012	Tom and Jerry: Robin Hood and His Merry Mouse	No	Yes	No	
2013	Justice League: The Flashpoint Paradox	No	Yes	No	
2013	Scooby-Doo! Stage Fright	No	Yes	No	
2014	Scooby-Doo! WrestleMania Mystery	No	Yes	No	
2014	Son of Batman	Yes	No	No	
2014	Batman: Assault on Arkham	Yes	No	No	Co-directed with Jay Oliva
2015	Justice League: Throne of Atlantis	Yes	No	No	
2017	Batman and Harley Quinn	No	Yes	No	
2017	Lego Scooby-Doo! Blowout Beach Bash	Yes	No	No	
2018	Lego DC Comics Super Heroes: The Flash	Yes	No	No	
2018	Freedom Fighters: The Ray	Yes	No	No	
2019	Scooby-Doo! and the Curse of the 13th Ghost	No	Yes	No	
2019	Scooby-Doo! Return to Zombie Island	Yes	No	No	Co-directed with Cecilia Aranovich Hamilton
2020	Mortal Kombat Legends: Scorpion's Revenge	Yes	No	No	
2021	Scooby-Doo! The Sword and the Scoob	No	Yes	No	Uncredited
2021	Mortal Kombat Legends: Battle of the Realms	Yes	No	No	
2022	Catwoman: Hunted	No	No	Yes	
2022	Trick or Treat Scooby-Doo!	No	Yes	No	Uncredited
2022	Mortal Kombat Legends: Snow Blind	No	Yes	No	
2023	Justice League x RWBY: Super Heroes and Huntsmen Part One	No	No	Yes	
2023	Justice League x RWBY: Super Heroes and Huntsmen Part Two	No	No	Yes	
2023	Mortal Kombat Legends: Cage Match	Yes	No	No	
2024	Justice League: Crisis on Infinite Earths - Part Three	No	Yes	No	

=== Television ===
Year	Title	Director	Story Artist	Producer	Notes
1995–2004	The Simpsons	Assistant	Yes	No	Assistant Director: 12 episodes Character layout artist: 27 episodes
2005–2008	Avatar: The Last Airbender	Yes	Yes	No	Director: 12 episodes Assistant Director: 3 episodes Storyboard artist: 20 episodes
2008–2009	Batman: The Brave and the Bold	No	Yes	No	8 episodes
2011–2012	ThunderCats	No	No	Yes	26 episodes
2013	The Looney Tunes Show	Yes	No	No	7 episodes
2013	Green Lantern: The Animated Series	No	Yes	No	Episode: "Love Is a Battlefield"
2013	The Legend of Korra	No	Yes	No	Episodes: "The Sting" and "Light in the Dark"
2014–2016	Mike Tyson Mysteries	Yes	Yes	No	Director: 15 episodes Storyboard artist: 2 episodes
2017–2018	Justice League Action	No	Yes	No	3 episodes
2017	Justice League Action Shorts	No	Yes	No	Episode: "True Colors"
2017–2018	Freedom Fighters: The Ray	Yes	No	No	
2026–	Avatar: Seven Havens	No	No	Executive	
