= Scooby-Doo! and the Beach Beastie =

- iTunes cover
- Directed by: Victor Cook
- Written by: Doug Langdale; Candie Langdale
- Based on: Scooby-Doo by Joe Ruby and Ken Spears
- Produced by: Victor Cook; Alan Burnett; Jason Wyatt (line producer)
- Starring: Frank Welker; Matthew Lillard; Mindy Cohn; Grey DeLisle
- Music by: Robert J. Kral
- Production company: Warner Bros. Animation
- Distributed by: Warner Home Video
- Release date: May 5, 2015
- Running time: 22 minutes
- Country: United States
- Language: English

Scooby-Doo! and the Beach Beastie is the sixth direct-to-DVD special produced by Warner Bros. Animation, based upon the Scooby-Doo Saturday morning cartoons. It was released on May 5, 2015, on the Scooby-Doo! 13 Spooky Tales: Surf's Up Scooby-Doo DVD.

== Plot ==
Fred recently has had an extreme obsession with nets, as most of his plans to catch the monsters he and the rest of Mystery Inc. encounter are caught with nets. To get them out of his mind, Scooby and the gang decide to take a vacation in Florida, where Daphne's uncle Sandy owns a hotel, only to find that it is being attacked by a shape-shifting sea monster that is stealing jewelry. During their first encounter with it, Fred tries to use a net, but to no avail. Daphne tries to help Fred with his net problem by getting him to relax in an area without nets, which proves to be difficult, since the lobby and beach have nets all over the place.

Velma goes to Kurt's hotel, the rival hotel next door. Kurt is somewhat glad about the commotion, as the people who have left Sandy's hotel in fear of the monster have come to his hotel. However, a holographic water show, which is supposed to be a big attraction at Kurt's hotel, is closed for repairs, and the repair company, Brownstone Industries, is taking too much time to fix it. Meanwhile, Shaggy becomes sad that Scooby is spending too much time with another guest's dog, Shana, making him feel lonely. Shaggy finds comfort with Kiki Brownstone, the female dog's owner, and the wife of Grafton Brownstone. Kiki, like Shaggy, also feels lonely, as her dog, Shana, is with Scooby and her husband is nowhere to be found.

That night, during a party, the hotel is attacked again by the monster, who is attracted to Kiki's necklace. Using the necklace as bait, the gang gets the monster to follow them, noticing a human silhouette in the center. Velma tells Fred to find them a net, which he builds out of video cassettes. As he prepares the trap, the monster wraps a tentacle around Velma. Fred successfully captures the person behind the monster, which turns out be Grafton Brownstone, Kiki's husband, and head of Brownstone Industries. Grafton had actually sold Kiki's necklace for money, and the necklace that Kiki was wearing was fake. In order to prevent Kiki from finding out, he planned on stealing the necklace. Kiki and Shana go to post Grafton's bail, and Scooby and Shaggy reconcile.

== Cast ==
- Frank Welker as Scooby-Doo, Fred Jones
- Matthew Lillard as Shaggy Rogers
- Mindy Cohn as Velma Dinkley
- Grey DeLisle as Daphne Blake
- David Kaye as Grafton Brownstone
- Beth Tapper as Annette
- Christopher Showerman as the police officer
- Adam West as Sandy Blake
- Melissa Rauch as Kiki Brownstone
- Daran Norris as Kurt
