= Robert J. Kral =

Australian film and television composer (born 1967)

- Born: Robert Joseph Kral; 5 July 1967 (age 59); Medindie, South Australia, Australia
- Occupations: Film and TV music composer
- Instruments: Piano, sampler, synthesiser, MIDI keyboard
- Years active: 1988–present
- Labels: Transition, La-La Land, Bulletproof, Verve

Robert Joseph Kral (born 5 July 1967) is an Australian film and television composer. He is best known for composing music scores for horror, superhero, and many animated WB productions. He scored the TV series, Angel (the spin-off of Buffy the Vampire Slayer), for most of the entire series (1999–2004, Seasons 1 through 5). In February 2005, a soundtrack album, Angel: Live Fast, Die Never, was released, with 18 out of 25 tracks composed by Kral. He also composed the scores for the TV series Miracles (2003) for ABC / Touchstone, Jake 2.0 (2003–04), Duck Dodgers (2003–05) for Warner Bros. Animation, The Inside (2005) for Fox Television, and the Lionsgate / Sci Fi series, The Lost Room (2006). His animated film scores include Superman: Doomsday (2007), Green Lantern: First Flight (2009), Scooby-Doo! Legend of the Phantosaur (2011) and Superman vs. The Elite (2012). He scored the animated TV series, Scooby-Doo! Mystery Incorporated (2010–13) and DVD feature film Batman: Assault on Arkham (2014). Recent soundtrack productions include the scores for Justice League Dark (2017), Suicide Squad: Hell to Pay (2018) and Scooby-Doo! Return to Zombie Island (2019). In 2005, Kral won an Annie Award for Best Music in an Animated Television Production, for his work on Duck Dodgers.

== Biography ==
Robert Joseph Kral was born on 5 July 1967 in Medindie, South Australia. At the age of four, he started to learn the drums and then piano the following year. At the age of 15 years he started writing music for full orchestra, with the symphonic work "The Revival of Zion". He studied music at the Elder Conservatorium of the University of Adelaide completing a Bachelor of Music. He was taught by Tristram Cary, United Kingdom-born film composer, for part of his degree. Kral later recalled "I was mostly interested in creating moods and atmospheres for stories ... I’ve always been captivated by how movies can move an audience emotionally, due in great part to a good score". After university he worked for the South Australian Film Corporation and Channel Nine sound departments. In 1988 he began composing for many medical documentaries, beginning with composing and performing the soundtrack for Thalassaemia, a Relative Chance, an instructional video, on "the genetics and spread of Thalassaemia" for Adelaide Children's Hospital.

During his studies, he met American composer Lolita Ritmanis, who encouraged him to seek work in Los Angeles. In the early 1990s he provided the music for a 30-minute videocassette, Victoria: Australia's Garden State, which was used to promote that state's tourist attractions, and a total of 24 videos for Panorama Australia covering other cities and regions of Australia In 1991–92 Kral studied film scoring at the University of Southern California, he composed several small film scores, and feature film Maslin Beach (1997), which was filmed at the South Australian location of the same name.

Kral applied for work with Mike Post, a US TV music composer, but was picked up by Post's associate, Christophe Beck. Beck had scored Buffy the Vampire Slayer from its second season in 1998, and used Kral as a ghost-writer. Beck asked Kral to work with him on the new spin-off series Angel, which commenced airing in October 1999. In Buffy, Ballads, and Bad Guys Who Sing: Music in the Worlds of Joss Whedon (November 2010) Kral is described by Matthew Mills as belonging to the "Christophe Beck 'school'" with fellow composers of the Buffy/Angel shows. Beck and Kral worked closely during season 1, sometimes co-composing, while Kral continued independently for seasons 2 to 5 as Beck concentrated on Buffy and other projects. Angel finished its last season in May 2004.

In 2000 Kral released a sound collection for use in TV production, Robert J. Kral Collection, on Transition Music, which compiled 21 of his tracks. In February 2005, a soundtrack album, Angel: Live Fast, Die Never, was released on Virgin Records, with 18 out of 25 tracks composed by Kral. In 2005, Kral won an Annie Award for Best Music in an Animated Television Production, for his work on the cartoon series, Duck Dodgers (2003–05). In 2007 he scored the music for The Dresden Files (Lionsgate / Sci Fi Channel), the animated DVD feature film Superman: Doomsday for Warner Bros., and co-composed Batman: Gotham Knight (2005) animated DVD feature also for Warner Bros. He described the Superman: Doomsday soundtrack as "So big and epic and emotional. I like material that moves you through a series of emotions".

Kral's work in 2008 included scoring The Haunting in Connecticut, for Gold Circle Films / Lionsgate, which was released in theatres in March 2009 to a domestic US opening weekend of $25 million, and Green Lantern: First Flight (2009) for Warner Bros. Animation (DVD feature film). His 2009 scores included the Scooby Doo animated feature for WB animation: Scooby-Doo! Abracadabra-Doo (aired in 2010). Kral scored the related animated TV series, Scooby-Doo! Mystery Incorporated (2010–13) and WB animated DVD feature, Scooby-Doo! Camp Scare in 2010, with DVD productions of Scooby-Doo! Legend of the Phantosaur (2011) and Superman vs. The Elite (2012), "Scooby Doo! Stage Fright!" (2013) and "Batman: Assault on Arkham" (2014). Additional soundtrack CD releases include Superman: Doomsday (2007), Batman: Gotham Knight (2008) and "Batman: Assault on Arkham" (2014). In 2012 he scored a TV movie, Fatal Honeymoon, which dramatised the death of Tina Watson.

From September 1997 Kral lived in Pasadena, then Rolling Hills Estates as of 2003, he is married to Alison Houghton Kral, a theological writer, and the couple have a daughter and son. In 2012 he told Kevin Zimmerman of SESAC Magazine that when composing it is "important that in the end you sound like yourself, or it's all just the same. I'm glad I had piano lessons, because now so much of the work comes from inputting music into sequencing programs via MIDI keyboard. The technology in the last 10 years has exploded, and taking advantage of that is really the job of every composer today".

== Discography ==
=== Soundtrack albums ===
- Robert J. Kral Collection – Transition Music (2000)
- Angel: Live Fast, Die Never – Rounder Records (14 February 2005 (UK) / 17 May 2005 (US))
- Superman: Doomsday – La-La Land Records (23 October 2007)
- The Haunting in Connecticut – Bulletproof, Verve (31 March 2009)
- Green Lantern: First Flight – La-La Land Records (6 October 2009)
- Batman: Assault on Arkham – La-La Land Records (11 August 2014)
- Justice League Dark – La-La Land Records (February 2017)

== Filmography ==
=== Film ===
Year	Title	Notes
1989	Land of the Mighty Murray: Australia's Mighty River	Documentary short films
1989	Land of Island Treasures: Kangaroo Island	Documentary short films
1989	Land of Ancient Grandeur: South Australia's Flinders Rangers	Documentary short films
1991	Swot Crayzy	Short film; soundtrack music
1992	The Cleveland Wild Park	Documentary short film
1993	The Tunnel	Short film
1994	The Legend of Billy the Kid	Documentary film
1995	South Australia: Australia's Festival State	Documentary short films
1995	Adelaide: Australia's Festival City	Documentary short films
1997	Maslin Beach	
1997	Killing Mr. Griffin	Additional music
1997	Hostile Intent	Additional music; uncredited
1998	The Hostage	
1998	Bone Daddy	Additional music; uncredited
1998	Airborne	Additional music
2002	The Video Picture Book of Roses	Documentary film
2007	Postcards from the River Murray	Documentary films
2007	Inside The Lost Room	Documentary films
2007	Superman: Doomsday	
2008	Batman: Gotham Knight	Segments: "Field Trip" and "Deadshot"
2009	The Haunting in Connecticut	
2009	The Fear is Real: Reinvestigating the Haunting (in Connecticut)	Documentary short film
2009	Green Lantern: First Flight	
2010	Scooby-Doo! Abracadabra-Doo	
2010	Scooby-Doo! Camp Scare	
2011	Scooby-Doo! Legend of the Phantosaur	
2012	Superman vs. The Elite	
2012	Scooby-Doo! Spooky Games	Short film
2012	Fatal Honeymoon	Television film
2012	Big Top Scooby-Doo!	
2012	Scooby-Doo! Haunted Holidays	Short film
2013	Scooby-Doo! Stage Fright	
2013	Scooby-Doo! and the Spooky Scarecrow	Short films
2013	Scooby-Doo! Mecha Mutt Menace	Short films
2014	Batman: Assault on Arkham	
2015	Scooby-Doo! and the Beach Beastie	Short film
2016	Lego Scooby-Doo! Haunted Hollywood	
2017	Justice League Dark	
2017	Lego Scooby-Doo! Blowout Beach Bash	
2018	Suicide Squad: Hell to Pay	
2018	Lego DC Super Hero Girls: Super-Villain High	
2019	Scooby-Doo! and the Curse of the 13th Ghost	
2019	Scooby-Doo! Return to Zombie Island	
2021	Injustice	
2021	Scooby-Doo! The Sword and the Scoob	
2023	Scooby-Doo! and Krypto, Too!	

=== Television ===
Year	Title	Notes
1994	Cyberkidz	2 episodes
1996–1997	Two	11 episodes; with Christophe Beck; uncredited
1999–2004	Angel	With Christophe Beck
2003	Miracles	
2003	Jake 2.0	
2003–2005	Duck Dodgers	With Douglas Romayne
2005	The Inside	Also theme music composer with Andy Ross
2006	The Lost Room	
2007–2008	The Dresden Files	
2010–2013	Scooby-Doo! Mystery Incorporated	
2015	Lego Scooby-Doo! Knight Time Terror	Television special
