= Scooby-Doo! Haunted Holidays =

2012 direct-to-video special by Victor Cook

- Directed by: Victor Cook
- Written by: Michael F. Ryan
- Based on: Characters by Hanna-Barbera Productions
- Produced by: Victor Cook; Alan Burnett
- Starring: Frank Welker; Matthew Lillard; Mindy Cohn; Grey DeLisle
- Music by: Robert J. Kral
- Production company: Warner Bros. Animation
- Distributed by: Warner Home Video
- Release date: October 16, 2012
- Running time: 22 minutes
- Country: United States
- Language: English

Scooby-Doo! Haunted Holidays is a 2012 animated television special based on the Scooby-Doo franchise. The special was produced by Warner Bros. Animation, released by Warner Home Video, and directed by Victor Cook, with a screenplay by Michael F. Ryan. In the special, Scooby-Doo, Shaggy, Fred, Velma, and Daphne, embark on a holiday-themed mystery.

== Plot ==
Scooby and the gang are celebrating along with a parade dressed up in costumes and enjoying the fun moment with many other people. While everyone is having fun, standing beside Fred is Havros Menkle, the owner of Menkle's toy store, who is unhappy as his toy store business isn't doing so well and the sales are going down. Havros is stressed and aware of the situation and is paranoid and suspicious of it. Fabian, Havros's nephew apologizes for his uncle's behavior to Fred.

After a while, Scooby and Shaggy get interrupted by a monstrous looking snowman while messing around in a yard of a spooky house. Both Scooby and Shaggy make a run as the snowman chases them. The snowman then suddenly causes a blizzard by using its breath, which ruins the entire parade causing people to flee.

Fabian guides the gang into the toy store to stay safe from the snowman monster, which Fabian calls the Sinister Snowman. He then explains to the gang about the Sinister Snowman curse caused by a man named Vladimar Harstikor, who used to live in the old mansion, and the history of that man and his uncles’ conflict and the history of it.

The gang later decides to go and investigate the abandoned old mansion to find out what is really going on. They split up and were able to pick up multiple clues and evidence left behind by someone behind all the chaos going on. All of a sudden Shaggy and Scooby get chased again by the same Sinister Snowman from before and the whole gang ends up running away from the mansion.

They all gather back at Menkle's toy store and plan out their next move with Fabian, Scooby and Shaggy get into disguises and the rest get frozen by the Sinister Snowmen while investigating the boiler room of the toy store. The Sinister Snowmen later makes its way to Shaggy and Scooby which the two run away into the Santa Village part of the toy store. This is where they meet the actual Santa and not the Santa actor.

The Sinister Snowman soon catches up to the three and chaos unfolds throughout the toy store. The three decide they can get help if they can get the frozen glockenspiel working again, which is located at the very top of the toy store, so they rushed towards the glockenspiel room while being chased by the snowman monster.

Fred, Daphne and Velma break free from the ice and go to find Shaggy and Scooby doo while Santa manages to repair the glockenspiel and get it running again and then disappears. The Sinister Snowman soon comes into the glockenspiel room and starts chasing Scooby and Shaggy around the room as the glockenspiel's music gets the attention of nearby people.

As soon as the clock hits 12 AM, a mechanical elf that is part of the glockenspiel tries to hit the bell, but the Sinister Snowman gets caught up in the way, causing the elf to hit the Sinister Snowman instead and making the monster collapse.

The remaining gang members, having been drawn by the music, arrive in the glockenspiel room in time and unmask the snowman together, which turns out to be Fabian under the snowman suit. Havros and Clete also arrives with the police in time and explain that his previous paranoid behavior was caused by the suspicion that the store sales are going down due to Fabian stealing most of the money and that Fabian wanted to make his uncle leave the store so that he can sell it.

This meant that Havros's suspicion turned out to be true, so the police arrest Fabian. The gang then talks about how they managed themselves through the chaos and at the same time, Santa can leave with a sleigh flying away.

Once again, the gang manages to solve another mystery and things can now go back to normal for the toy store. The following day, the Havros' toy store is filled with customers and the gang can be seen in costumes helping out around the store and having fun.

== Characters ==
- Scooby-Doo: The iconic talking dog, who is both a pet and a friend to the entire Mystery. Inc gang.
- Velma Dinkley: the intelligent, bespectacled member of the gang, excels at solving puzzles and finding clues.
- Daphne Blake: the fearless and fashionable member of the group who often finds herself in danger while solving mysteries.
- Sinister Snowman: Evil Snowman.
- Santa Claus: He appears to be an obese older man with white hair and a white beard.
- Fabian Menkle: the partner of Havros Menkle, contributing to the mysteries.
- Vladimar Harstikor: An elderly man with white hair, a mustache, and bags under his eyes. He hated people so much and wanted to be left alone.
- Clete: is the janitor at Menkle's Toy Store, who is Caucasian male with gray hair and a mustache. He seems very loyal to his boss (Mr. Menkle).
- Havros Menkle: a recurring character, often a suspect or involved in the mysteries.
- Shaggy Rogers: a laid-back, always-hungry character, best friends with Scooby-Doo, and known for his distinctive catchphrase "Zoinks!".
- Fred Jones: is the leader of the Mystery Inc. gang, and the driver of their van. He is a teenage male, with blond hair.

== Cast ==
- Frank Welker as Scooby-Doo, Fred Jones
- Matthew Lillard as Norville "Shaggy" Rogers
- Mindy Cohn as Velma Dinkley
- Grey DeLisle as Daphne Blake
- Carlos Alazraqui as Havros Menkle, Janitor
- Crispin Freeman as Fabian Menkle
- Fred Tatasciore as Santa Claus actor, real Santa Claus, Sinister Snowman

== Production ==
Writing

Scooby-Doo! Haunted Holidays was written by Michael F. Ryan. Ryan has helped write stories for multiple films and animations such as DreamWorks, Disney, Warner Bros., Marvel, and Cartoon Network. Some of the popular titles he helped write would be Phineas and Ferb, Teenage Mutant Ninja Turtles, The Powerpuff Girls and Dexter's Laboratory.

Casting

Collette Sunderman is an American director principally involved with voice direction for animated television, film productions and video games. She started her career in animation in the early 1990s. After she had worked several years she did casting and co-directed with Kris Zimmerman on Dexter's Laboratory. Regularly Sunderman works for Warner Bros. Animation/Hanna Barbera and Cartoon Network studio as well as Scooby-Doo projects.

Animation

Scooby-Doo! Haunted Holidays utilized Flash animation as the primary animation technique. Flash animation is a digital animation technique and also it was created with Adobe Animate which is a computer animation program. This technique can create fluid motion. This allowed the animators to capture the distinctive, whimsical style of the Scooby-Doo series, bringing the characters and their adventures to the screen with precision.

Music

The film's official soundtrack was composed by Robert Joseph Kral, an accomplished Australian composer. Kral, born on July 5, 1967, is well-regarded for his contributions to the film and television industry. He is mainly recognized for his work in various animated Warner Bros. (WB) productions and other horror, superhero films. Most of his work is for WB animated films like Batman and Scooby-Doo.

== Release ==
Scooby-Doo: Haunted Holidays was released as a Christmas special episode on Direct-to-DVD on October 16, 2012, as part of the 13 Spooky Tales: Holiday Chills and Thrills DVD. It was later then aired on December 6 of the same year.

== See also ==
- Santa Claus in film
