= Batman: Mystery of the Batwoman =

2003 film by Curt Geda

- Promotional poster
- Directed by: Curt Geda
- Written by: Michael Reaves
- Story by: Alan Burnett
- Based on: Batman created by Bill Finger and Bob Kane
- Produced by: Margaret M. Dean
- Starring: Kevin Conroy; Kimberly Brooks; Héctor Elizondo; Elisa Gabrielli; Kevin Michael Richardson; Kelly Ripa; Kyra Sedgwick; David Ogden Stiers
- Edited by: Margaret Hou
- Music by: Lolita Ritmanis
- Production company: Warner Bros. Television Animation
- Distributed by: Warner Home Video
- Release date: October 21, 2003
- Running time: 74 minutes
- Country: United States
- Language: English

Batman: Mystery of the Batwoman is a 2003 American animated superhero film based on The New Batman Adventures (1997–1999). Released in the U.S. in October 2003, the film was produced by Warner Bros. Animation and is the fourth film in the DC Animated Universe.

== Plot ==
Batman and Robin face a brand-new mystery; a new heroine, Batwoman, has arrived in the city, whose identity is a mystery. While she claims to fight for justice, Batwoman forsakes Batman's code to never take a life. Batman must figure out who she is, while stopping the Penguin and Rupert Thorne from selling illegal weapons to the fictional nation of Kasnia. The two villains employ gangster Carlton Duquesne to provide protection.

Batman, with Robin, sets out to stop Batwoman from making mistakes as she tries to take out the villains and as he encounters numerous twists, setbacks, and apparent false leads in determining her true identity. Bruce Wayne, Batman's alter ego, also becomes romantically involved with Kathy Duquesne, the crime boss' daughter.

In addition to Kathy, Bruce is introduced to two other women who, as his investigation into the Batwoman's true identity continues, seem to fall well into suspicion: Dr. Roxanne "Rocky" Ballantine, a new employee of Wayne Tech, who seemingly but briefly forms a bond with Tim Drake, Robin's alter-ego, and whose technology development Batwoman uses against Penguin; and Detective Harvey Bullock's new partner Sonia Alcana, who seems to know too much about the weapons being smuggled by the Penguin and Carlton Duquesne. With Carlton unable to stop Batwoman's raids on the facilities used to hold the various weapons, the Penguin calls Bane for additional support to ensure that there are no more losses as a result of the Batwoman.

Not long after Bane's arrival in Gotham, it is revealed that there is not one, but three Batwomen, all of whom were the women suspected by Batman. Kathy and Sonia met taking art classes at college, and Sonia and Rocky were roommates; and they all harbor grudges against the Penguin, Thorne, and Carleton Duquesne: the Penguin had framed Rocky's fiancé Kevin, Thorne had burned down a store owned by Sonia's family, and Carlton Duquesne's war with a rival gang got Kathy's mother (his wife) killed. The women took turns to create the illusion of a single Batwoman: Rocky built Batwoman's gadgetry, Kathy financed her efforts, and Sonia created the Batwoman persona as a tribute to Batman, who had saved her life nine years earlier and inspired her to become a police officer.

Kathy plants a bomb in the ship taking the weapons into international waters for the exchange – but not before Bane unmasks her. Kathy and Batman narrowly escape as the bomb goes off, while Carlton forsakes his ties to Thorne and the Penguin to save his daughter's life, and Bane falls into the Gotham River.

Thorne, Penguin, and Duquesne are arrested. Sonia takes the fall for the Batwoman operation, resigns from the GCPD, and decides to leave Gotham. Batman gives Sonia evidence that he discovered which helps clear Rocky's fiancé. Carlton agrees to testify against Thorne and the Penguin in exchange for a lighter sentence. After reconciling with her father, Kathy drives off with Bruce.

== Voice cast ==
- Kevin Conroy as Bruce Wayne / Batman
- Kyra Sedgwick as Batwoman
- Héctor Elizondo as Bane
- David Ogden Stiers as Penguin
- Kimberly Brooks as Kathleen "Kathy" Duquesne
- John Vernon as Rupert Thorne
- Kelly Ripa as Dr. Roxanne "Rocky" Ballantine
- Elisa Gabrielli as Detective Sonia Alcana
- Kevin Michael Richardson as Carlton Duquesne
- Eli Marienthal as Tim Drake / Robin
- Tara Strong as Barbara Gordon
- Efrem Zimbalist Jr. as Alfred Pennyworth
- Bob Hastings as Commissioner James Gordon
- Robert Costanzo as Detective Harvey Bullock
- Tim Dang as Kevin

Additional voices by Chad Einbinder, Phil Hayes, Sal Lopez, John Mariano, Andrea Romano, Shane Sweet, and Sean Patrick Thomas

Cherie appears as herself, performing the single "Betcha Never".

== Production ==
In September 2002, it was reported that a new direct-to-video Batman film was in development at Warner Bros. Animation Batman: The Mystery of Batwoman Kelly Ripa had been erroneously reported to be playing Batwoman after previously announcing on her talk show Live! With Regis and Kelly that she was working a new Batman project.

Despite that the majority of returning characters retain the same designs from The New Batman Adventures era, the character animation is brighter and more lively than from the series. Rupert Thorne was featured in the original show Batman: The Animated Series, but not in The New Batman Adventures. As such, the animators had to create a new appearance for him specifically for this film; he is streamlined and seems to have lost some weight compared to his previous appearance. The animation was outsourced to DR Movie.

Paul Williams, who voiced Penguin in the animated series, did not reprise his role in this film. The character was instead voiced by David Ogden Stiers. The reasoning behind this decision was Alan Burnett deciding to experiment with a different voice, and bring more of a threatening ambience to the character. Bruce Timm, who was not involved with this film, said that he wouldn't have recast Williams, but nonetheless respected Burnett's decision.

This film also marked the final performances of Bob Hastings as Commissioner James Gordon and John Vernon as Rupert Thorne before their deaths in 2014 and 2005 respectively.

Series writers Alan Burnett and Michael Reaves wrote the script. The film also shows further continuity with previous Bruce Timm-developed Batman series: Barbara Gordon's romantic relationship with Bruce Wayne is coming to an end, Dick Grayson has left Gotham to fight crime in Blüdhaven as Nightwing, and Robin and Batgirl are older than their depictions in The New Batman Adventures, but have not yet been forced to quit in the wake of the flashback events in Batman Beyond: Return of the Joker as the film is set before those events.

== Chase Me ==
The US DVD release of Batman: Mystery of the Batwoman (October 21, 2003) included the bonus short silent film Chase Me. Chase Me is a 2003 American direct-to-video animated short film also based on the animated series The New Batman Adventures. The silent film was produced by Warner Bros. Animation, and follows Batman as he chases Catwoman across Gotham City. The chase sequences are accompanied by a soundtrack mix of a quiet piano score, and jazz style score that plays up the chase.

The film was written by Paul Dini and Alan Burnett and was directed by Curt Geda. It was co-produced by Geda, Burnett, Margaret M. Dean, Benjamin Melniker, and Batman-producer Michael Uslan. The score is by Lolita Ritmanis.

Chase Me is also included as part of the main feature on video streaming sites such as Amazon Video.

== Soundtrack ==
The soundtrack album, composed, orchestrated and produced by Lolita Ritmanis, produced by John Takis and mastered by James Nelson was released on March 29, 2016, by La-La Land Records. Bonus tracks and the score to the animated short "Chase Me" were also included.

Track list

1. Main Title (2:02)
2. Opening* (4:26)
3. He's Been Waiting / Weapons Factory (1:12)
4. Start Flexing (1:19)
5. The Reason I Called / Rocky Ballantine (1:52)
6. Bat-Signal* (0:42)
7. I'll Get Back to You / Factory / After the Explosion (4:47)
8. Chase Through Store / Rear-View Mirror (2:12)
9. Bruce and Kathy (2:01)
10. Real Muscle / Get Out! (1:54)
11. Paint the Town (1:05)
12. Revolving Door / Time to Burn a Bat (3:59)
13. I Was Wrong About You (0:37)
14. Subway / Identified (0:45)
15. I Don't Want to See You / High Stakes (1:27)
16. The Ship Sails Tonight / Batwoman in Flight (1:49)
17. Close to Our Goal (1:36)
18. This Is It / Ship Leaves the Harbor (2:22)
19. Penguin Gets a Call / Trouble (2:22)
20. Bon Voyage, Señor Batman* (1:21)
21. Close Look / It Has to End / Explosions (3:18)
22. Ship Is Going Down (5:17)
23. Bane's Demise (1:25)
24. Bullock Sees Sonia / The Badge (1:32)
25. I Missed You (1:26)
26. Mystery End Credits (1:25)
- Total Score Time: 54:13

Chase Me

27. Chase Me (5:55)
28. Chase Me End Credits (0:33)
- Total Score Time: 6:28

Bonus tracks

29. News Source (0:38)
30. Piano Source (0:40)
31. Department Store (0:44)
32. Rude Interruption (0:14)
33. Main Title (film version)* (2:13)

== Reception ==
The film holds a 60% approval rating on Rotten Tomatoes. DVD Talk rated the film as 3.5 stars of 5 stars as "Recommended".

== Release ==
The movie was released on VHS and DVD on October 21, 2003 in full-screen format. The film made its television premiere on May 1, 2004 on Cartoon Network's Toonami block. The Blu-ray release would be released 10 years later on March 12, 2013; this release was in extended widescreen format.
