= Batman: Assault on Arkham =

2014 superhero film directed by Ethan Spaulding and Jay Oliva

- Home video re-release cover art (2016)
- Directed by: Jay Oliva; Ethan Spaulding
- Written by: Heath Corson
- Based on: Characters appearing in comic books published by DC Entertainment
- Produced by: James Tucker
- Starring: Kevin Conroy; Neal McDonough; Hynden Walch; Matthew Gray Gubler
- Edited by: Christopher D. Lozinski
- Music by: Robert J. Kral
- Production companies: Warner Bros. Animation; DC Entertainment; MOI Animation (Animation services)
- Distributed by: Warner Home Video
- Release dates: July 25, 2014 (San Diego); July 29, 2014 (Digital); August 12, 2014 (Physical)
- Running time: 76 minutes
- Country: United States
- Language: English

Batman: Assault on Arkham is a 2014 American direct-to-video animated superhero film featuring the DC Comics character Batman and the 21st film of the DC Universe Animated Original Movies. Loosely based on the Batman: Arkham video game franchise, the film was directed by Jay Oliva and Ethan Spaulding, produced by James Tucker, and written by Heath Corson. The story focuses primarily on the Suicide Squad, particularly Batman villains Deadshot and Harley Quinn with Batman himself in a supporting role. In the film, the Suicide Squad, consisting of six criminals, are dispatched by Amanda Waller to break into Arkham Asylum, where they must contend with the asylum's inmates and Batman as they attempt to complete their mission to reclaim information stolen by the Riddler.

It was first screened at the 2014 San Diego Comic-Con on July 25, 2014, and it was released digitally on July 29 and on physical media on August 12.

== Plot ==
Batman rescues the Riddler from a black ops assassination ordered by A.R.G.U.S.'s director Amanda Waller and returns him to Arkham Asylum. In response, Waller captures wanted super-criminals Black Spider, Captain Boomerang, Deadshot, Harley Quinn, KGBeast, Killer Frost, and King Shark, recruits them into the Suicide Squad to break into Arkham and recover a thumbdrive in Riddler's cane containing sensitive knowledge about the squad, and implants nano-bombs in their necks to make them comply. After killing KGBeast for attempting to leave, Waller sends the remaining squad members to Gotham City to receive equipment from the Penguin. While staying overnight at the Iceberg Lounge, Harley and Deadshot have a one-night stand. The next day, Harley attracts Batman's attention amidst his search for a dirty bomb the Joker hid in Gotham in order to send herself to Arkham. As she is taken to her cell, an incarcerated Joker taunts Harley, who steals a guard's gun and shoots his cell in a rage.

Meanwhile, the other squad members infiltrate Arkham, looping the previous day's security footage to distract Batman and Waller. The group locates the Riddler's cane and Harley's mallet, but discover the former's cell is empty. Realizing their ruse, Batman subdues the squad before assuming Spider's suit and place in their ranks. Using the chaos, Frost breaks into the Riddler's cell, having been secretly ordered by Waller to kill him. However, he reveals he is a former member of the squad who knows how to disarm the nano-bombs. She takes him to the others, who agree to let him disarm their bombs in exchange for helping him escape. Concurrently, the Joker notices a structural weakness Harley made during her attempt on his life, short-circuits the cell door, and escapes.

The Riddler uses an electroshock machine to fry the squad's bombs as Waller calls for an update. Realizing their treachery, she detonates the bombs, but only succeeds in killing Shark, whose thick skin made him immune to the electricity, and Spider. Batman reveals himself and confronts the squad, but they are attacked by the Joker, who intends to kill Deadshot for having sex with Harley, though she convinces the former to forgive her. While Batman deduces from Deadshot the Joker hid his bomb in Harley's mallet, the Joker frees the inmates to cover his escape. Deadshot escapes in a helicopter, leaving Boomerang behind, while Frost steals a police car in an attempt to escape during the ensuing rampage between the GCPD and Arkham's inmates. However, Bane throws the car, leaving Frost's fate ambiguous. Deadshot soon learns that the Joker and Harley have stowed away in the helicopter while Batman gives chase. Deadshot and the Joker fight, causing the helicopter to crash into a building. Deadshot pins the Joker to the helicopter before pushing it off onto the streets below, while Batman knocks out Harley and disarms the bomb.

In the aftermath, Batman confronts Waller for allowing the Riddler to escape and warns her to discontinue the Task Force X program. She dismisses him, taunting him about how the Joker's body was not found in the helicopter wreckage. Once Batman leaves, Waller notices Deadshot, reunited with his daughter, is targeting her with a scoped rifle from afar.

== Voice cast ==
- Kevin Conroy as Bruce Wayne / Batman
- Neal McDonough as Floyd Lawton / Deadshot
- Hynden Walch as Harleen Quinzel / Harley Quinn
- Matthew Gray Gubler as Edward Nygma / Riddler
- Troy Baker as Joker
- CCH Pounder as Amanda Waller
- Greg Ellis as George Harkness / Captain Boomerang
- Giancarlo Esposito as Eric Needham / Black Spider
- John DiMaggio as Nanaue / King Shark
- Jennifer Hale as Louise Lincoln / Killer Frost
- Nolan North as Anatoli Knyazev / KGBeast, Oswald Cobblepot / Penguin
- Eric Bauza as Security Guy
- Chris Cox as Commissioner James Gordon
- Martin Jarvis as Alfred Pennyworth
- Peter Jessop as Watch Commander
- Christian Lanz as Jonathan Crane / Scarecrow, Victor Zsasz
- Andrea Romano as Woman
- Travis Willingham as Morgue Guy
- Mick Wingert as Joker Security Guy

Additionally, Bane, Two-Face, and Poison Ivy make non-speaking cameo appearances as Arkham Asylum inmates.

== Production ==
=== Development ===
In 2009, video game developer Rocksteady Studios launched the beginning of their Batman: Arkham series with Batman: Arkham Asylum. With a total of four main entries, the series reached critical acclaim and success. Near the end of development of Batman: Arkham Origins, Warner Bros. Animation approached Heath Corson to write a story focusing on the Suicide Squad set within the Batman Arkhamverse. Jay Oliva and Ethan Spaulding were brought in to director and James Tucker to produce. Upon reading the script, Oliva stated that "...it was very different than what I was used to, because I started prepping for this film, I thought to myself 'Well you know what, if I directed this a little differently [sic] like what if I directed this like a Guy Ritchie film.'" The film would be directed with a similar style to a Poliziotteschi Italian mob film. For the team, Corson knew that he wanted Deadshot, Captain Boomerang and Harley Quinn, because she knew the in-and-outs of Arkham. He described the relationship between Deadshot and Boomerang as "...Ocean's Eleven, but at every turn Brad Pitt tried to kill George Clooney."

=== Pre-production ===
In the casting process, some actors were taken from their Batman: Arkham roles while others were not. Kevin Conroy, the voice actor of Batman in Batman: The Animated Series, most of the Batman: Arkham games, and many other DC properties was brought on to voice the character. Neal McDonough was brought on the play Deadshot instead of Chris Cox who voices Deadshot in the Arkham games, who instead voices Commissioner Jim Gordon. Hynden Walch reprises her role as Harley Quinn from The Batman. Arleen Sorkin, who played Harley Quinn in Batman: Arkham Asylum, nor Tara Strong who voiced the character in Batman: Arkham City, were brought in for the film. Matthew Gray Gubler voices the Riddler instead of Wally Wingert from the series and Troy Baker voices the Joker instead of Mark Hamill. Baker reprises his role from Arkham Origins CCH Pounder reprises her role as Amanda Waller from Batman: Arkham Origins and Martin Jarvis reprised his role as Alfred Pennyworth from the Arkhamverse. Greg Ellis was brought in to voice Captain Boomerang, Giancarlo Esposito to voice Black Spider, John DiMaggio as King Shark, and Jennifer Hale as Killer Frost. Nolan North reprises his role as the Penguin from the Arkham games, and additionally voices KGBeast. Christian Lanz voices Scarecrow, replacing Dino Andrade from Arkham Asylum, as well as Victor Zsasz, replacing Danny Jacobs from Asylum City.

For the soundtrack, Robert J. Kral was brought in to compose. In a press release, Oliva said "We usually do the operatic epic music that we've all become accustomed to in the live action and animated comic book films for the last twenty five years.... James Tucker, my producer, was very supportive of the idea of doing a more contemporary take on the superhero music and when Rob sent us his first pass of the score, we were tremendously pleased."

=== Production ===
When handling the look of Arkham Asylum, the artists mainly took inspiration from the way it was depicted in Batman: Arkham Asylum, while also aiming to increase the scary factor the game held. The team also aimed to add a foreboding and haunting nature to the depiction and sounds. The voice actors were recorded at Salami Studios in North Hollywood, California.

== Soundtrack ==
Batman: Assault on Arkham (Music from the DC Universe Movie)

Film score by Robert J. Kral
- Released: July 30, 2014
- Length: 51:21
- Label: WaterTower Music

The soundtrack to Batman: Assault on Arkham was released on July 30, 2014, with music composed by Robert J. Kral.

=== Track list ===
Batman: Assault on Arkham (Music from the DC Universe Movie)
No.	Title	Length
1.	"Nigma's Confrontation / It's Batman"	3:10
2.	"Criminal Montage"	3:06
3.	"Task Force Indoctrination"	2:41
4.	"Dropping Down"	2:00
5.	"Gearing Up / Beer Room Challenge"	1:51
6.	"Harley Arrested to Arkham"	3:01
7.	"Infiltrating Arkham & Joker Assault"	5:33
8.	"Killer Frost's Kiss & Black Spider's Microwave"	1:59
9.	"Harley Bait & King Shark's Work"	1:27
10.	"Suicide Squad in the Big House"	3:44
11.	"Batman's Gotham & Property Room Access"	2:59
12.	"Batman Fights Suicide Squad"	2:12
13.	"Joker's Out / Suicide Squad vs. SCU"	3:34
14.	"Joker Attacks Batman"	1:40
15.	"Prisoners Released"	2:45
16.	"Chopper Fight / Poison Ivy / The Batplane"	2:03
17.	"Chopper Crash"	2:24
18.	"Final Confrontations"	2:08
19.	"Batman – Assault On Arkham End Credits"	3:04
Total length:		51:21

== Reception ==
=== Critical reception ===
The film has an aggregated score of 75% on Rotten Tomatoes based on eight reviews.

Scott Mendelson of Forbes roundly praised Assault on Arkham for its action, art style, humor, voices, and characters, calling it one of the best films of DC's direct-to-video lineup. He described it as a "gleefully immoral" heist film which, having "no real [plot] arc to speak of", relies on its violent action and clever character dynamics within the Suicide Squad to carry it. Due to its villainous protagonists, dark comedy, and sexual content, Mendelson considers the production of Assault on Arkham an experimental decision by DC, and a successful experiment as it tells a style of comic book story that would never get approval as a live-action project.

Seth Robison of Newsarama was far more critical, considering the animation, characterization, and storytelling in the film poor. He had particular dislike for the voice acting, which he believed squandered a talented cast by delivering a "disjointed" performance, and for Assault on Arkham's interpretation of Amanda Waller, which he believed simplified her into merely another villain. He further found Deadshot's sympathetic characterization opaque to non-comic readers and Harley Quinn's crazy act obnoxious. Overall, Robison deemed the experience of the film "superficial" and thought it compared unfavorably to those offered by the Arkham video games and the Justice League Unlimited episode "Task Force X".

=== Sales ===
The film earned $5,820,248 in domestic home video sales.

== Continuity with the video game series ==
Assault on Arkham was announced as being set in the universe of the Batman: Arkham video game franchise, taking place after Arkham Origins, and two years before Arkham Asylum according to Jay Oliva. James Tucker stated that the film was intended to bridge the gap between Arkham Origins and Arkham Asylum. However, the 2024 video game Suicide Squad: Kill the Justice League, which takes place after Arkham Knight, directly conflicts with the continuity elements of the film. In particular, Kill the Justice League features the appearance of King Shark, who sports a different design and personality. The main characters also do not acknowledge having worked together prior to the events of the game, with three of them (Harley Quinn, King Shark, Captain Boomerang) featured in this film, whereas Deadshot is re-established as an African-American man, while the Caucasian version of Deadshot, who is featured in both the film and previous Arkham games, is alluded to be a multiversal variant.
