= Floigan Bros. =

2001 video game

Floigan Bros. Episode 1
- North American cover art
- Developer: Visual Concepts
- Publisher: Sega
- Designers: Andy Ashcraft; Hirokazu Yasuhara
- Composer: Brian Luzietti
- Platform: Dreamcast
- Release: NA: July 31, 2001; PAL: November 23, 2001
- Genre: Action-adventure
- Mode: Single-player

Floigan Bros. Episode 1, also known as simply Floigan Bros. or Floigan Brothers, is an action-adventure video game developed by Visual Concepts and published by Sega. It was released in 2001 only for the Dreamcast.

== Plot ==
The Floigan Brothers, Moigle (voiced by Frank Welker) and Hoigle (voiced by Jason Marsden), live by themselves in their very own junkyard. Moigle is the larger of the two brothers, and is not controlled by the player. Hoigle, on the other hand, is directly controlled by the player. The two act as opposites; Moigle is larger and dimwitted, while Hoigle is smaller and far more intelligent than his brother. Moigle decides to surprise his brother with a machine, the only catch is that the parts he needs are scattered around their junkyard. Thus, Hoigle and Moigle begin to look for parts to the machine by solving various puzzles. However, hovering above the junkyard in a blimp, is Baron Malodorous. He wants the junkyard for his own uses, and sends out his cat mercenaries to weed out the Floigan Brothers. By defeating the Baron's cats, the brothers can find the parts to Moigle's machine.

== Gameplay ==
Screenshot showing both characters and actions available.

Floigan Bros. is presented in a fully 3D environment in which the player is able to interact with almost everything. The setting is the brothers' junkyard and the surrounding areas such as the swamp, bluff, cavern and dog yard. The player is in direct control of Hoigle for the entirety of the game. When there is something to be interacted with, commands will appear within the Dreamcast's button layout. Hoigle can perform a variety of tasks to solve a puzzle or defeat one of the Baron's cats. However, the interaction with Hoigle's brother, Moigle, is the highlighted feature of the game. The more badly he is treated, the less friendly and responsive he becomes to the player's commands. The interactions with Moigle include hugging, punching him in the stomach, giving him something to eat and speaking to him. Moigle goes through different emotions depending on what happens to him. For instance, Moigle can come in contact with a spider, and will not do anything until his fears subside. Alternatively, getting Moigle angry will cause him to become more aggressive, and, in turn, be used for throwing Hoigle to previously unreachable places. Another feature of Moigle is that the player can play short minigames with him to earn points. When enough points are collected, they can be used to make Moigle learn new skills, tricks and games. These new actions can be to overcome his fear of spiders, play with a yo-yo, and many others. According to IGN, the game is very short and can be completed in an hour.

== Development ==
Floigan Bros. was in development in 1999 before the Dreamcast itself was even released but the game wasn't released until 2001, after production of the Dreamcast had ceased. Sega confirmed that there were "developmental setbacks" during this time.

The game's logo also has the words 'episode 1' on it, implying that it was meant to be the first of a series. This is backed up with an IGN interview with Visual Concepts' Greg Thomas where they repeatedly referred to the game as "the first installment", mentioned "further installments" and specifically in relation to additional episodes they said "Ultimately, we want to make as many of these as we can" and "Each new Floigan Bros. game would have its own storyline".

Downloadable content (DLC) also existed but not all of the content was released due to the discontinuation of the Dreamcast and the game's commercial failure. These were monthly DLC files which included mini games, mail, outfits, etc. The actual content was hidden on the game disc, but was unlocked when the player downloaded the DLC file. On March 10, 2017, Dreamcast Live announced that the original developers had released a modded version of the VMU save file to allow all of the content to be accessible for the first time ever. Dreamcast Live provided access to the DLC file.

There was also the intention to allow players to save and trade their Moigles using the VMU.

== Reception ==
Reception

Aggregate score
Aggregator	Score
Metacritic	64/100

Review scores
Publication	Score
Edge	3/10
Electronic Gaming Monthly	1.5/10, 2/10, 1.5/10
EP Daily	8/10
Eurogamer	6/10
Game Informer	8.25/10
GameRevolution	C−
GameSpot	5.2/10
GameSpy	6.5/10
IGN	8.4/10
Next Generation	3/5
X-Play	1/5

The game received mixed reviews according to the review aggregation website Metacritic. IGN said that the game was "woefully short". Jeff Lundrigan of NextGen said that it "obviously needed to cook a bit longer." However, Four-Eyed Dragon of GamePro said, "If you enjoy a good challenge, then embark on this adventure. The fun, whimsical gameplay in Floigan Bros. will have you cursing at some of the harder tasks but laughing at most other times. Ultimately, the star of this show is a compelling A.I. that you won't find in any other game." (Note: GamePro gave the game 4/5 for graphics, sound, control, and fun factor.)
