= Justice League Dark (film) =

2017 film directed by Jay Oliva

- Blu-ray disc cover
- Directed by: Jay Oliva
- Screenplay by: Ernie Altbacker
- Story by: Ernie Altbacker; J. M. DeMatteis
- Based on: Justice League Dark by Peter Milligan and Mikel Janín
- Produced by: James Tucker
- Starring: Matt Ryan; Camilla Luddington; Jason O'Mara
- Edited by: Christopher D. Lozinski
- Music by: Robert J. Kral
- Production companies: Warner Bros. Animation; DC Entertainment; DR Movie (animation services)
- Distributed by: Warner Home Video
- Release dates: January 24, 2017 (digital); February 7, 2017 (DVD and Blu-ray release)
- Running time: 75 minutes
- Country: United States
- Language: English

Justice League Dark is a 2017 American adult animated superhero film produced by Warner Bros. Animation and distributed by Warner Home Video. Featuring the DC Comics team of the same name created by Peter Milligan and Mikel Janín, the film is the 28th of the DC Universe Animated Original Movies and the eighth of the DC Animated Movie Universe. Unlike most installments in the DC Animated Universe Movies series, Justice League Dark features an original premise. The film stars Matt Ryan as John Constantine, Camilla Luddington as Zatanna, and Jason O'Mara as Batman. Ryan, O'Mara and Jeremy Davies reprised their respective roles from previous media. It was released on Digital HD on January 24, 2017, and on DVD and Blu-ray on February 7.

A sequel, Justice League Dark: Apokolips War, was released in May 2020.

== Plot ==
Law-abiding citizens begin to murder people, believing their victims to be demonic creatures. The Justice League concludes that magic is the source of the crimes, but Batman is skeptical. Later that night at Wayne Manor, he finds a written message on his walls: "Constantine".

Five days prior, occult detective John Constantine and Jason Blood engage the Demons Three in a high-stakes poker game. Constantine offers his home, the House of Mystery, in exchange for a box of artifacts, including the Dreamstone. When both parties are caught cheating, Constantine magically forces Blood to summon Etrigan to dispatch the demons. Blood reprimands Constantine and the two part ways.

In the present, Batman seeks out Zatanna to find Constantine. They are joined by Deadman, and the two lead Bruce to the House of Mystery, where they meet Constantine; Constantine reluctantly agrees to help investigate the supernatural occurrences. The team then visits Ritchie Simpson, a collector of magic relics and old friend of Constantine and Zatanna. Ritchie, who has a magical form of cancer, is resentful of Constantine for abandoning him to his current predicament, but loans them the Keshanti Key, which Constantine and Zatanna use to view one of the victim's memories. A mysterious figure summons a creature to consume the victim and cover up the crime. Constantine and Zatanna manage to find how the victim was possessed and narrowly escape, with Constantine retrieving the image of a ring the spirit was wearing.

They return to Ritchie's to identify the ring, but find him close to death with Blood standing over him. Constantine pursues and captures Blood while Batman administers adrenaline to revitalize Ritchie. They take Ritchie and Blood back to the House of Mystery, and Constantine charges Black Orchid, the House's spiritual embodiment, with tending to Ritchie while the rest interrogate Blood. Blood explains that he sought to access the House of Mystery and retrieve the Dreamstone, and found Ritchie dying at the scene. He reveals that, centuries ago, the sorcerer Destiny created the Dreamstone in an attempt to overthrow Camelot, forcing people to see their worst nightmares and feeding off their torment. Blood was mortally injured in the battle, prompting Merlin to summon Etrigan to defeat Destiny, whose soul was imprisoned in the Dreamstone. After the battle, Merlin bound the dying Blood and Etrigan together, knowing that they would be needed in the future.

Ritchie briefly wakes and claims Felix Faust was his assailant. With Swamp Thing's help, the group locates Faust's observatory, defeating him in battle and concluding that he is innocent. Ritchie awakens and is revealed to have the other piece of the Dreamstone, which has been keeping his cancer in remission; he takes over the House and forces Black Orchid to burn her own body to ash. Constantine tries to convince Ritchie that Destiny is manipulating him, but Destiny uses the Dreamstone to take control of his body.

Destiny destroys the House and departs; Zatanna saves the group, but passes out from exertion. The Justice League tries to fight Destiny, but his magic forces them to turn on each other. Etrigan attacks, but is separated from Blood. Constantine summons Swamp Thing, who engages Destiny while Batman and Zatanna subdue the League. Destiny rips Alec Holland's corpse from Swamp Thing, breaking his will and forcing him to withdraw. Constantine tricks Destiny into bringing him and Deadman within his shield, allowing Deadman to control Destiny long enough for Blood to fatally wound him with Etrigan's sword. Constantine and Batman destroy the Dreamstone, bringing back Ritchie, who is dragged to Hell for his sins, ensuring that Destiny cannot come back. Blood succumbs to his original wounds and is buried near his old village. Zatanna, having agreed to join the League, offers Constantine a position as well. He declines, claiming that Batman would not approve, but Zatanna states it was Batman's idea. The two return to the reconstructed House of Mystery to discuss their League applications, and Deadman joins the restored Black Orchid as her soulmate.

== Voice cast ==
Voice actor	Character
Justice League
Jason O'Mara	Bruce Wayne / Batman
Jerry O'Connell	Kal-El / Clark Kent / Superman
Rosario Dawson	Diana Prince / Wonder Woman
Roger Cross	John Stewart / Green Lantern
Justice League Dark
Matt Ryan	John Constantine
Camilla Luddington	Zatanna Zatara
Nicholas Turturro	Boston Brand / Deadman
Ray Chase	Jason Blood / Etrigan the Demon
Roger Cross	Dr. Alec Holland / Swamp Thing
Colleen Villard	Black Orchid
Demons Three
JB Blanc	Abnegazar
Jeffrey Vincent Parise	Rath
Fred Tatasciore	Ghast
Other
Enrico Colantoni	Felix Faust
Jeremy Davies	Ritchie Simpson
Alfred Molina	Destiny
JB Blanc	Merlin
Brian T. Delaney	Husband; Shroud leader
Jeffrey Vincent Parise	Father; Police officer
Laura Post	Businesswoman; Mother

== Production ==
Justice League Dark is directed by Jay Oliva, and stars the voices of Matt Ryan, Jason O'Mara, Camilla Luddington, Nicholas Turturro, and Ray Chase. It is the first Justice League film and the second DC Universe animated film and the second film by Warner Bros. Animation to be rated R by the MPAA for its violent content.

== Reception ==
The review aggregator Rotten Tomatoes reported an approval rating of 78%, with an average score of 7/10, based on 9 reviews.

Dave Trumbore from Collider wrote: "Justice League Dark is a briskly paced, darkly magic adventure that gives some of DC's most shadowy heroes a chance to shine in a story that folds in mythology and mystery, while never losing sight of what it means to be a hero". Felix Vasquez Jr. of Cinema Craze also praised the film, calling it a "fun celebration of supernatural elements in DC comics".

It earned $3,325,752 from domestic home video sales.

== Spin-off and sequels ==
=== Spin-off ===
The film spawned a spin-off animated web series titled Constantine: City of Demons that was released on The CW's online streaming platform CW Seed on March 24, 2018, with Ryan reprising his role. The series was originally made to be a sequel to the live-action series Constantine and a part of the Arrowverse franchise, but writer J. M. DeMatteis stated that the direction of this series was changed and that it was set in the DC Animated Movie Universe.

=== Sequels ===
A sequel titled Justice League Dark: Apokolips War was released on May 5, 2020, on digital download, followed by a May 19 release on Blu-ray. It concludes a five-film story arc, based on the "Darkseid War" storyline by Geoff Johns, in the DCAMU that started from Justice League: The Flashpoint Paradox and its sequel Justice League: War then later revisited in The Death of Superman and Reign of the Supermen. The DC Showcase short Constantine: The House of Mystery was released in May 2022 and is a narrative sequel to Apokolips War.
