= Scooby-Doo! Camp Scare =

- DVD cover
- Directed by: Ethan Spaulding
- Written by: Jed Elinoff & Scott Thomas
- Based on: Scooby-Doo by William Hanna, Joseph Barbera, Iwao Takamoto, Joe Ruby & Ken Spears
- Produced by: Spike Brandt and Tony Cervone
- Starring: Frank Welker; Grey DeLisle; Mindy Cohn; Matthew Lillard; Dee Bradley Baker; Mark Hamill; Phil LaMarr; Scott Menville; Stephen Root; Tara Strong; Lauren Tom
- Edited by: Joseph Molinari
- Music by: Robert J. Kral
- Production company: Warner Bros. Animation
- Distributed by: Warner Home Video
- Release date: September 14, 2010
- Running time: 72 minutes
- Country: United States
- Language: English

Scooby-Doo! Camp Scare is a 2010 direct-to-video animated comedy horror-mystery film; the fifteenth direct-to-video film based upon the Scooby-Doo Saturday morning cartoon, and was released on September 14, 2010. The film was released seven months after the release of Scooby-Doo! Abracadabra-Doo. The 15th direct-to-video Scooby-Doo film, the film sold 53,389 units in its first week and as of January 2013, it has sold approximately 194,000 units.

== Plot ==
Mystery Inc. travel to Camp Little Moose, Fred Jones' old summer camp, to serve as camp counselors for the summer. Upon arrival however, they find head counselor Burt and forest ranger John Knudsen, who explain that one of the camp's old legends, the Woodsman, seemingly came to life and scared off the campers. Knudsen advises Burt to close the camp, but three children, Luke, Trudy, and Deacon, arrive. Fred subsequently convinces Burt to keep the camp open while he and Mystery Inc. investigate the Woodsman. Later that night, the Woodsman attacks the camp, ordering everyone to leave.

Despite this, the campers spend the day at Big Moose Lake, home of the rival Camp Big Moose. However, they are attacked by another camp legend come to life, the Fish Man. Amidst the chaos, Scooby-Doo discovers a building at the bottom of the lake. Following this, Camp Big Moose's head counselor, Jessica, confronts Mystery Inc. believing their campers stole an RV and sonar equipment from their camp. Using the RV's tracking device, Velma Dinkley locates it in the nearby Shadow Canyon. The group splits up, with Fred, Jessica, Luke, and Daphne Blake examining the underwater building while Velma leads the others to Shadow Canyon. As Fred's group discover a town at the lake bed along with dynamite hidden in a cavern, Velma's group find the missing RV and equipment, the latter of which they learn was being used to scan the lake before they are chased off by another legend come to life, the Spectre.

Upon returning to Camp Little Moose, a scared Deacon leaves for Camp Big Moose with Jessica while Mystery Inc. leave to ask a local shop owner about the underwater town and learn that it was originally a mining town called Moose Creek before it was evacuated to make way for Big Moose Lake and a dam. Furthermore, the treasure of a local gangster named Ricky LaRue is said to be buried there. Before he died, LaRue told his cellmate, "Babyface Boretti", that he can find the treasure when the sun hits the town steeple on the Summer Solstice. Upon their return, the gang find that the Woodsman has destroyed Camp Little Moose, though Burt, Luke, and Trudy are safe. They soon realize that the Woodsman intends to destroy the dam and successfully evacuate everyone before a flash flood destroys the campgrounds further.

Heading to the now exposed Moose Creek, Mystery Inc. re-encounter Jessica, who says she was following Deacon. The group are suddenly attacked by the Woodsman, who separates Fred, Jessica, and Luke while Deacon captures the others, revealing himself as Boretti. Fred's group defeat the Woodsman, but he disappears and is replaced by the Fish Man, though Scooby knocks it into Mystery Inc's van, the Mystery Machine. The group subsequently unmask it, revealing Knudsen, and capture Boretti before he can escape with the treasure. Velma deduces the pair teamed up to find the treasure, with Boretti stealing Camp Big Moose's equipment so he can locate Moose Creek while Knudsen posed as all three monsters to scare off interlopers. When Mystery Inc. unexpectedly arrived, Boretti disguised himself as a camper in the hopes of making them leave.

While Boretti and Knudsen are arrested, Burt and Jessica merge their camps to form Camp Little Big Moose and Mystery Inc. finishes their work as camp counselors. In a post-credits scene, the Spectre is revealed to be real.

== Voice cast ==
- Frank Welker as Scooby-Doo and Fred Jones
- Matthew Lillard as Shaggy Rogers
- Mindy Cohn as Velma Dinkley
- Grey DeLisle as Daphne Blake
- Scott Menville as Luke
- Tara Strong as Trudy
- Stephen Root as Burt
- Lauren Tom as Jessica
- Mark Hamill as Deacon / Babyface Boretti
- Dee Bradley Baker as Ranger Knudsen
- Phil LaMarr as Darrel

== EP ==
An EP soundtrack for the film was released exclusively to iTunes Stores in the U.S. on September 14, 2010.

1. "Here Comes Summer" - Just for Laughs - 2:15
2. "Perfect World" - Just for Laughs - 2:37
3. "Summertime" - Susanna Benn - 2:30
