= Superman: Doomsday =

2007 animated film

- Home video release poster
- Directed by: Bruce Timm; Lauren Montgomery; Brandon Vietti
- Screenplay by: Duane Capizzi
- Story by: Duane Capizzi; Bruce Timm
- Based on: Superman by: Jerry Siegel; Joe Shuster
- Produced by: Bruce Timm
- Starring: Adam Baldwin; Anne Heche; James Marsters; John DiMaggio; Tom Kenny; Swoosie Kurtz; Cree Summer; Ray Wise; Adam Wylie
- Narrated by: James Marsters
- Edited by: Joe Gall
- Music by: Robert Kral
- Production company: Warner Bros. Animation
- Distributed by: Warner Home Video (Note: Released under the Warner Premiere label.)
- Release dates: July 26, 2007 (San Diego Comic-Con); September 18, 2007 (Home video)
- Running time: 77 minutes
- Country: United States
- Language: English
- Budget: $3.5 million

Superman: Doomsday is a 2007 American animated superhero film adapted from the DC Comics storyline "The Death of Superman", which focuses on the death and return of the superhero Superman. Released by Warner Home Video, it is the first film of the DC Universe Animated Original Movies. The film received generally positive reviews from critics, and made $10 million in home media sales on a budget of $3.5 million.

== Plot ==
Superman and Lois Lane are romantically involved, but Lois is not happy with him not revealing his secret identity to her. While digging, workers from LexCorp unearth the spaceship of Doomsday, a genetically-engineered super-soldier that is highly hostile toward any life form it comes across. It massacres the digging crew and begins a rampage towards Metropolis, killing animals and humans on sight. When Doomsday reaches Metropolis, it decimates the military until Superman arrives. Superman and Doomsday engage in a fierce battle across Metropolis, with Superman being brutally beaten but eventually winning. However, the victory is short-lived as Superman dies in Lois' arms.

Lex Luthor kills his assistant Mercy Graves to ensure no one else knows of LexCorp's involvement with Doomsday's release. The world mourns Superman and Metropolis honors him with a memorial. Superman's friends cope with his death in various ways. Jimmy Olsen takes a job at a tabloid newspaper The National Voyeur, Perry White becomes an alcoholic, and Lois, having realized that Clark was Superman, visits Martha Kent for counsel. In Superman's absence, Metropolis is overwhelmed by criminals. Toyman uses a giant mechanical spider to hold children hostage. Lois decides to save them herself, but Toyman tries to kill her and a little girl. Superman digs out of his grave and saves Lois and the girl, apprehending Toyman. He does not appear to be the same as Superman, but Lois dismisses it as shock. She becomes suspicious, however, when Martha tells her that Clark has not called home.

The resurrected Superman is revealed to be a clone created by Luthor who is keeping the real Superman's body preserved in a tube, unaware that Superman has barely survived. He periodically tortures the clone Superman in a special lead-lined room. A robot from the Fortress of Solitude detects that Superman is still alive, recovers his body, and begins restoring him to health. Meanwhile, the clone's attitude darkens when he hears that Toyman killed a child. In retaliation, the clone abducts the villain and kills him in front of the police station. The city is stunned and the clone threatens the populace into abiding by the law. This convinces Lois and Martha that the clone is not the real Superman.

Lex berates the clone, orders him to find Superman's corpse, and threatens to kill him if he misbehaves again. The clone deduces that a lead-shielded kryptonite pellet is in his brain, and removes it. Lois tranquilizes Luthor and searches his files with Jimmy, discovering that Luthor is cloning an army of Supermen. Lex awakens armed with a gun, but the original clone saves Lois and Jimmy, destroying the cloning facility and the yet-to-be-awakened clones. Luthor hopes to ambush the clone in a panic room, but the clone simply locks him inside and tosses the entire room into the street. This latest presumed murder triggers military action which fails.

Superman is revived and resolves to confront the clone, although his powers are not fully restored. To improve his odds he dons a "solar suit" and brings a Kryptonite gun. The two battle and Lois manages to hit the clone with a kryptonite blast. The clone destroys the gun, but the Kryptonite canister sticks to the clone's chest and Superman vaporizes it with his heat vision. Before dying, the clone tells Superman to protect the people. Lois is sure of the real Superman once he kisses her, and the crowd is similarly happy now that they know that the real Superman is alive. At Lois' apartment, Superman reveals himself to be Clark Kent, and Lois embraces him with elation. At LexCorp, Lex is revealed to be critically injured, but still alive. He smiles, musing that there may still be a way for him to destroy Superman.

== Voice cast ==
- Adam Baldwin as Kal-El / Clark Kent / Superman
  - Baldwin also voiced Superman's clone
- Anne Heche as Lois Lane
- James Marsters as Lex Luthor
- John DiMaggio as Toyman
- Tom Kenny as The Robot
- Swoosie Kurtz as Martha Kent
- Cree Summer as Mercy Graves
- Ray Wise as Perry White
- Adam Wylie as Jimmy Olsen
- Kevin Smith as Grumpy Man
- Kimberly Brooks as Murphy
- Townsend Coleman as Drill Operator
- Chris Cox as Damon Swank
- Hettie Lynn Hurtes as Newscaster
- James Arnold Taylor as Officer Tucker

== Production ==
Despite similar animation styles, the film used new animation models, and is only loosely based on the DC Animated Universe that lasted from 1992 to 2006, with a few allusions to the older series, as well as the Fleischer Superman series, found in the Fortress of Solitude.

=== Kevin Smith cameo ===
Writer/director Kevin Smith made a brief cameo appearance in the film, during the scene in which Superman apprehends Toyman. As Superman carries Toyman off, a man modeled after and voiced by Smith remarks, "Like we really needed him to bust up a mechanical spider, right? Lame!" This is a reference to the Warner Bros. Superman project that he and film producer Jon Peters collaborated on, which never came to fruition. According to Smith, Peters wanted Superman to fight a giant spider in the film's third act. Smith revealed in his interview film An Evening with Kevin Smith that he incorporated this and Peters' other ideas into his script. Tim Burton was eventually brought onto the project, and discarded Smith's screenplay, wishing to employ a different screenwriter. A giant mechanical spider eventually was used in the climax of the 1999 Warner Bros. film Wild Wild West, which Peters co-produced.

== Release ==
Superman: Doomsday was released on DVD and Blu-Ray September 18, 2007, by Warner Home Video. Before the DVD release, the movie was first screened during San Diego Comic-Con at the San Diego Convention Center on July 26, 2007. It made its U.S. broadcast premiere on Cartoon Network on July 12, 2008, in a heavily edited format. One of the aforementioned edits appears only in the South Korean release, wherein Superman is seen flying over South Korea congratulating Ban Ki-moon for becoming the 8th Secretary-General of the United Nations.

The film' was exclusively available on DVD with a collectible packaging depicting Superman bursting through the movie's logo. It was the only film in the series originally released without a special edition.

Following a year later was a two-disc special edition DVD release. The special features included a retrospective look at how the Death of Superman comic came to be, a look at voice actors, as well as a Defeat Doomsday game with a 10-minute preview to the next animated film; Justice League: The New Frontier.

Release of a Blu-ray version was announced with a release date of February 26, 2008, but was delayed.

Warner Home Video released a new "Special Edition" Blu-ray and DVD, featuring new bonus materials on November 25, 2008.

=== Rating ===
The film's violence and profane language garnered a PG-13 rating from the MPAA. This is the first time an animated Superman project received a strong rating. Most of the more visceral deaths take place off-camera; however, the fight sequences are intense. During the Doomsday vs. Superman fight scene, Superman coughs a puddle of blood onto the ground, perhaps the most visual use of blood in the film. This marked the start of DC animated films featuring more adult content compared to previous projects, and a majority of subsequent DC Universe Original Animated Movies would receive a PG-13 or R rating.

=== Soundtrack ===
Superman: Doomsday (Soundtrack from the DC Universe Animated Original Movie)

Film score by Robert J. Kral
- Released: October 26, 2007
- Length: 57:34
- Label: La-La Land Records

The soundtrack to Superman: Doomsday was released on October 26, 2007. The music was composed by Robert J. Kral. The soundtrack listing:

Superman: Doomsday (Soundtrack from the DC Universe Animated Original Movie)
No.	Title	Length
1.	"Superman Doomsday Main Title"	2:05
2.	"Fortress of Solitude"	1:33
3.	"Alien"	2:25
4.	"Killing the Hick"	0:52
5.	"Doomsday Rising"	2:11
6.	"Superman vs Doomsday"	1:49
7.	"Doomsday Battle"	2:11
8.	"Superman's Sacrifice"	2:38
9.	"The Death of Superman"	2:07
10.	"Lois & Martha"	0:48
11.	"Toy Man Attacks"	2:28
12.	"Return of the Hero"	2:22
13.	"Superman Clone"	3:16
14.	"Heartbeat"	0:43
15.	"Relocated"	1:13
16.	"Lois Was Right"	0:37
17.	"Cat Rescue"	1:42
18.	"A Safe Superman"	1:47
19.	"Lois' Plan"	2:21
20.	"Clone Discovery"	1:30
21.	"Luthor's Fate"	0:32
22.	"Superman's Return"	2:27
23.	"Superman vs. Superclone"	4:56
24.	"Superman's Victory"	4:23
25.	"Smallville Elementary"	1:03
26.	"Superman: Doomsday End Titles"	2:58
Total length:		57:34

== Reception ==
=== Critical response ===
The film received favorable reviews from critics. Following the screening at Comic-Con, and its release on DVD, the movie garnered mostly positive reviews, with some reviewers commenting it was a marked improvement compared to other recent DC animated adaptations; some commented it raised the bar for the follow-up to the live-action Superman Returns which had been released the previous summer. Many also agreed it was also better in comparison to the recent animated films Marvel Studios had released based on their characters (such as Ultimate Avengers), in part due to the more adult and action-packed story in keeping with its PG-13 rating. Many reviews spoke highly of James Marsters' and Adam Baldwin's voice acting as Lex Luthor and Superman, while reviews of Anne Heche's portrayal of Lois Lane were mixed.

Not all reviews of the film were positive. DVDTalk.com, while praising the film's look and its technical presentation, called the film "a massive disappointment" and also negatively commented on the film's short running time and its lack of adherence to the storyline of The Death of Superman comics. James Deaux of Earth-2.net gave the movie a score of 5.5 out of 10, claiming the movie was far too overhyped and the result was not a bad, but a mediocre product with "many instances of...lazy writing, confusing animation, a couple of glaring plot holes and some mediocre voice acting." He also criticized the title of the movie given that Doomsday has such a minimal role in the film.

=== Sales ===
The Top 100 DVD sales chart for September 18–23, 2007 revealed that the film was placed at #4, and was two spots ahead of the season six release of Smallville, a Superman related television show. Variety made a report three months after the DVD's release, on DTV movies becoming very popular, and revealed that the DVD sold 600,000 copies, 30% more than what the studio predicted. At the present time, Superman Doomsday is the highest selling film from the DC direct-to-video series selling more than 680,000 units.
