= Scooby-Doo! Mecha Mutt Menace =

- iTunes cover
- Directed by: Michael Goguen
- Written by: Rick Copp
- Based on: Scooby-Doo by Joe Ruby and Ken Spears
- Produced by: Victor Cook
- Starring: Frank Welker; Matthew Lillard; Mindy Cohn; Grey DeLisle
- Edited by: Bruce King
- Music by: Robert J. Kral
- Production company: Warner Bros. Animation
- Distributed by: Warner Home Video
- Release date: September 24, 2013
- Running time: 22 minutes
- Country: United States
- Language: English

Scooby-Doo! Mecha Mutt Menace is the fourth direct-to-DVD special based on Scooby-Doo, released on September 24, 2013 on the 13 Spooky Tales: Ruh-Roh Robot DVD. The special features a giant robotic dog menacing the Scooby gang.

== Plot ==
Fred has entered the Science Expo in Houston, Texas, with a monster trapping project involving magnets, a trampoline, and a sticky net. A girl accidentally gets caught in the trap but is quickly freed by Fred. She catches Fred's eye and identifies herself as Melanie Staples, daughter of NASA Scientist Ned Staples. The gang checks out her father's demonstration where he unveils a large robotic dog, "Mecha Mutt", equipped to travel over Mars terrain.

Suddenly, Mecha Mutt goes rogue and starts firing lasers out at the audience. Security goes after the robot leaving a perplexed Dr. Staples to face anxious reporters who blame the malfunction on the "Space Specter". Melanie explains to the gang that the Space Specter is an old legend about a ship that lost control while piloting through some space mist. A spirit attached itself to the ship when it landed on Earth and now anytime something goes wrong at NASA, they blame the supposed specter. The group splits up to talk to the other two people who worked on Mecha Mutt besides Melanie's father.

Fred, Daphne, and Melanie talk to Lab Assistant Irv, who has a desk covered in food wrappers and sticky hands. Irv claims to have no idea why the machine went crazy having done a diagnostic test on it just before the demonstration. He laments being too busy to date before the trio take leave. Velma, Shaggy, and Scooby encounter a large mechanical dog on their way to Dr. Devon Albright's office. They find out Dr. Albright was the original creator of the Mecha Mutt technology and she's bitter that the more famous Dr. Staples was put onto her project to raise more funds.

Shaggy and Scooby go off and find vacuum sealed space food in a different room ‒ as well as Mecha Mutt. They are chased into a large wind tunnel room and get trapped inside before the industrial fan blows them all up. Velma, Fred, and Daphne find them and turn off the fan but not before Mecha Mutt escapes. Melanie soon joins them and Velma discovers the controls to the wind tunnel are sticky. When they confront Irv, he denies leaving the room and security footage backs up his claim. Velma and the others ask Dr Albright to lend them her prototype dog rover to find Mecha Mutt and Scooby and Shaggy get roped into piloting the dog rover.

On the rooftop, Shaggy and Scooby find Mecha Mutt. After a fight with missiles and rocket boosters, the two machines crash into a magnet-wielding crane and Mecha Mutt is destroyed. Velma identifies Melanie as the culprit behind Mecha Mutt's rampage. Melanie admits that she did it because her famous father always neglected her and she wanted to step out of his shadow to prove she was just as brilliant as him. In the end, Fred wins second place in the Science Expo and Shaggy and Scooby end up finding more than just astronaut food when they end up accidentally launched into outer space.

== Cast ==
- Frank Welker as Scooby-Doo, Fred Jones, Presenter
- Matthew Lillard as Shaggy Rogers
- Mindy Cohn as Velma Dinkley
- Grey DeLisle as Daphne Blake, Loud Speaker, Reporter #2
- Julie Bowen as Dr. Devon Albright
- Phil LaMarr as Stan, Mission Control
- Lacey Chabert as Melanie Staples
- Alan Rachins as Dr. Ned Staples
- Paul Reubens as Irv

== Release and reception ==
Chaz Lipp of The Morton Report felt that the special was "fast-paced" and "action-oriented".

The special has been available on Netflix Australia.
