= Scooby-Doo! Stage Fright =

2013 film by Victor Cook

- DVD cover
- Directed by: Victor Cook
- Written by: Doug Langdale; Candie Langdale
- Based on: Scooby-Doo by Joe Ruby and Ken Spears
- Produced by: Victor Cook; Alan Burnett
- Starring: Frank Welker; Mindy Cohn; Grey DeLisle; Matthew Lillard; Wayne Brady; Peter MacNicol; Ariel Winter
- Edited by: Bruce King
- Music by: Robert J. Kral
- Production company: Warner Bros. Animation
- Distributed by: Warner Home Video
- Release date: August 20, 2013
- Running time: 78 minutes
- Country: United States
- Language: English

Scooby-Doo! Stage Fright is a 2013 direct-to-DVD animated musical comedy horror film, and the twenty-first entry in the direct-to-video series of Scooby-Doo films. It was released on August 20, 2013, by Warner Premiere, the last film to be released under this label due to its dissolution the previous year. The movie made its linear premiere on Cartoon Network in the United States on March 25, 2023.

== Plot ==
The Mystery Inc. gang head to Chicago, Illinois for a talent show, called Talent Star, hosted by Brick Pimiento, where songwriting duo Fred and Daphne are finalists. Upon arrival, they learn that the opera house in which the show will be held is being terrorized by a Phantom, who is intensely lauding one of the finalists to win, Chrissy, a spoiled girl whose noisy parents are no more polite than she is. Fred and Daphne also befriend one of the finalists, Emma Gale, a violinist.

Not long after checking in for the talent show, the Phantom appears in the opera house and Fred, Daphne and Velma attempt to catch him using the surveillance cameras, but are unsuccessful due to the Phantom’s ability to seemingly appear in multiple places at once. While being chased by the Phantom, Shaggy and Scooby notice the Phantom has a strange lemon scent and afterwards, the gang split up to search for clues. Fred and Daphne meet the owner of the opera house Mel Richmond. They learn from Richmond that a Phantom once terrorized the opera house thirty-five years ago when it was a disco.

The dress rehearsal commences the next day. Fred and Daphne meet Emma’s parents, who are hoping to get the prize money to save their home from bankruptcy. During the dress rehearsal, the Phantom sabotages most of the finalists’ acts, leaving Chrissy, Emma, and Fred and Daphne as the only contestants left. Due to these attacks, Fred and Daphne decide to use themselves as bait to lure the Phantom out. The gang manage to track down a Phantom, only to find it is the original Phantom, a man named Steve Trilby. Steve admits to the gang that he vandalized the opera house due to his hatred for disco music, but that now he only goes into the opera house to get food. The gang return to the stage to find the Phantom setting fire to the opera house. With the help of Steve, they catch the Phantom, who is revealed to be Mel Richmond, hoping to collect the insurance money on the opera house. However, the gang learn that Richmond is not the Phantom they are after when they hear another Phantom threatening to destroy the place.

Later that night, using Emma as bait, the gang manage to capture the Phantom, who turns out to be Chrissy's father Lance. However, Shaggy and Scooby find out that assistant director Dewey Ottoman is also a Phantom, when they see him putting on lemon-scented hand sanitizer. They rush to Ottoman's office and find a magazine about the Soap Diamond, which is on display at a mineralogical center nearby. They rush to the mineralogical center and find Ottoman running out of the building. Ottoman trips and drops the Soap Diamond, which Scooby catches. Ottoman pursues the gang toward a drawbridge, where Fred tricks him into jumping into a barge filled with garbage. Ottoman is arrested and the gang return to the opera house just in time for Fred and Daphne to participate in a tie-breaker performance. When they realize what the loss would mean to Emma, they decide to throw the competition allowing Emma to win. At the end of the show, Pimiento confesses that he only used the Phantom to boost the show's ratings.

During the credits, the gang stops at a gas station where they see the news that Steve has become the new host of Talent Star after the show has been renewed for a tenth season. Velma advises Daphne to talk to Fred about their possible relationship as Shaggy and Scooby advise Fred to do the same. Then they head out to Goose Lake to solve the mystery of the Goose Lake Monster.

== Voice cast ==
- Frank Welker as Scooby-Doo and Fred Jones
- Matthew Lillard as Shaggy Rogers
- Grey DeLisle as Daphne Blake, Amy
- Mindy Cohn as Velma Dinkley
- Isabella Acres as Emma Gale
- Troy Baker as Phantom, Lance Damon
- Eric Bauza as K.T.
- Jeff Bennett as Mike Gale, Mel Richmond
- Wayne Brady as Brick Pimiento
- Vivica A. Fox as Lotte Lavoie
- Kate Higgins as Meg Gale, Cathy
- Peter MacNicol as Dewey Ottoman
- Candi Milo as Barb Damon
- John O'Hurley as The Great Pauldini
- Cristina Pucelli as Colette
- Kevin Michael Richardson as Security Guard #1, Hotel Clerk
- Paul Rugg as Steve Trilby
- Tara Sands as Nancy
- Tara Strong as Donna, News Anchor
- Travis Willingham as Waldo
- Ariel Winter as Chrissy Damon
- Keith Ferguson as Security Guard #2

== Critical response ==
DVD Verdict offered that the plot was an unoriginal "rip-off of the classic The Phantom of the Opera" mixed with "overtones of American Idol" as well as other "reality based music shows". They also offered that while Blu-ray quality gives the film a ghoulish quality, it would be scary to only the youngest viewers. They noted Frank Welker as the voice of Fred, being the only holdover from the original series, and Matthew Lillard's return as the voice of Shaggy. They also offered that Mindy Cohn "fits in well as nerdy Velma" and that Vivica A. Fox, Peter MacNicol, and Wayne Brady in supporting roles "make the film slightly more interesting for adults who want to play the 'is that so-and-so's voice?' game." They concluded that for children, the film "will probably be a lot of fun and somewhat thrilling", due to the car and foot chases and its various adventures, but that "adults will find it to be a bit tedious, but if that surprises you, clearly you haven't spent much time around children's entertainment."

Common Sense Media, in their review of the film, deemed it a generic Scooby-Doo movie, giving it 3 out of 5 stars, while noting the greater degree of romance it compared to most other Scooby-Doo films. They praised Brady's performance as Brick Pimiento, calling it "extremely believable".
