= Big Top Scooby-Doo! =

- DVD cover
- Directed by: Ben Jones
- Written by: Doug Langdale
- Based on: Scooby-Doo by William Hanna, Joseph Barbera, Iwao Takamoto, Joe Ruby, & Ken Spears
- Produced by: Spike Brandt; Tony Cervone; Alan Burnett (co-producer)
- Starring: Frank Welker; Grey DeLisle; Mindy Cohn; Matthew Lillard; Jeff Dunham; Greg Ellis; Carlos Ferro; Maurice LaMarche; Peter Stormare; Craig Ferguson
- Edited by: Kyle Stafford
- Music by: Robert J. Kral
- Production company: Warner Bros. Animation
- Distributed by: Warner Home Video
- Release date: October 9, 2012
- Running time: 80 minutes
- Country: United States
- Language: English

Big Top Scooby-Doo! is a 2012 American direct-to-DVD animated comedy mystery film, the eighteenth entry in the direct-to-video series of Scooby-Doo films. The DVD was released on October 9, 2012, by Warner Home Video, and made its TV premiere on September 8, 2012, on Cartoon Network in the United States.

== Plot ==
In Atlantic City, a werewolf breaks into a jewelry store, and steals a ruby necklace setting off an alarm. The creature scares off the security guard, then two policemen arrive. The duo try to stop the hairy thief, but it is too fast for them as the werewolf escapes into the nearby hills, where it overlooks a circus.

Scooby-Doo and the gang travel to Atlantic City on vacation. Fred sees that the Brancusi Circus is in town, and he enthusiastically takes the gang to go see it.

They arrive to find that the circus doesn't open until tomorrow, but decide to look around when they notice that the front door is unlocked. While searching, they meet a man pursuing a werewolf that has intruded into the circus. The werewolf attacks the gang, but is eventually scared off by Velma, using a spotlight.

The man thanks the gang and introduces himself as Marius Brancusi, the ringleader and the owner of the circus. Marius inherited the circus from his uncle last year and has been working to modernize it. He informs the gang that the werewolf they had encountered has been shadowing the circus for a few months, has scared off many of his artists, and has stolen jewelry wherever they are. He even suspects that the werewolf might be one of his own artists. Velma notices that this incident alludes to a case during the 18th century in Ingolstadt, where a werewolf named Hans collected a combination of jewels which enabled him to change into a werewolf at any time. After the gang tells Marius that they solve mysteries, Marius hires them to go undercover as circus performers.

Fred gets a junior-assistant-backup-trapeze position, Daphne performs a motorcycle act, Shaggy and Scooby will be animal performers, and Velma gets the Human Comet act (where she gets shot out of a cannon, much to her dismay).

The next morning, Marius introduces the gang to the other circus artists. Shaggy and Scooby team up with an animal trainer named Whitney Doubleday, who informs them that Marius plans to eliminate all the animal acts in order to modernize the circus. He claims that he didn't have a problem with retiring, but Shaggy still finds him suspicious. Velma is given a role as a human cannonball and works with a strong man named Archambault. Fred meets the other trapeze artist, Oliverio, and his girlfriend, Lena. Oliverio immediately becomes jealous of Fred when Lena begins to flirt with him. Daphne meets the circus clowns, Schmatko and Sisko. Sisko only communicates with a horn. Schmatko tells Daphne that he is reluctant to have this role as a clown, and says that he was once an actor in the Soviet Union. Afterwards, when Schmatko goes to get some refreshments, he is abducted by the werewolf.

Later on, the gang witness another robbery by the werewolf and are chased by a second werewolf wearing Schmatko's uniform. The gang escape and return to the circus to inform Marius. Despite this, Marius decides that the show must go on.

Daphne fills in for Schmatko, while Fred does a tightrope act to fill in time. The shows goes very well, especially for Scooby's act, although Shaggy takes some credit for Scooby's performance when he tells the audience that he is Scooby's 'trainer'. Before Velma can perform her act, the two werewolves attack Shaggy and Scooby. Fred and Marius manage to drop the trapeze safety net on them, but the werewolves are nowhere to be found when they search the net. In spite of the attack, the performers receive a big round of applause from the audience, who believe that the werewolves were just part of the show.

The next day, Marius shows the gang the reviews from last night's performance and comments that they are the best reviews he has ever received. In the reviews, the critics deemed Shaggy the greatest circus artist, much to the dismay of Scooby, whom the critics refer to as 'Scabby'. When Marius goes to show the rest of his artists the review, Archambault knocks a book about the Ingolstadt werewolves off the shelf in his office, causing the gang to suspect that Marius might be involved in the werewolf attacks, since Marius initially claimed to have no knowledge on werewolves. On the page which has the list of the jewels a werewolf needs, Velma finds that the only jewel the werewolf doesn't have is a carbonado. They confront Marius about the book, but Marius claims that the book isn't his.

When going for a lunch break, Shaggy receives numerous praises from the locals, which in turn continues to annoy Scooby so much that Shaggy bribes him with a wheelbarrow full of Scooby Snacks to prevent him from quitting. Marius informs the gang that they will be doing a private show for Wulfric Von Rydingsvard, a singer from the band Wülfsmöøon which Shaggy admires. Later on, Velma discovers that a carbonado is also called a black diamond, a jewel that Wulfric owns.

The gang prepare to catch the werewolf during the show, but before the show begins, Archambault, Lena, and Marius go missing. During the show, the werewolves appear after Scooby's act, along with three more, each wearing the clothes of the missing artists. The werewolves manage to steal the black diamond from Wulfric and continue to chase the gang. During the chase, Shaggy pulls off one of the werewolves' fur and finds red fur underneath it, and Scooby notices that the cage which had Doubleday's baboons is empty, making them realize the werewolves were just Doubleday and his trained baboons in disguise. Shaggy uses one of Doubleday's Spanish commands to stop them. Doubleday tries to escape, but he is tranquilized and caught by Archambault, who claims that he was tied up in a storage shed, but managed to break the ropes. There, they find the rest of the missing artists.

Doubleday, who is still unconscious, is taken away by the police, but they are unable to find any of the stolen jewels.

The next day, the Brancusi circus packs up and prepares to leave Atlantic City. Marius thanks the gang by giving them free passes to any of the Brancusi Circus performances. Archambault bids Velma good luck in finding the 'black diamond'. Schmatko informs Daphne that he has decided to quit his job as a clown and to pursue his dream in the theatre. However, after the circus train begins to depart, Velma starts to think that there is still something missing. Velma remembers that Archambault last heard that the jewel was referred to, not as a 'black diamond', but as a 'carbonado', and recounts that before Doubleday was captured, he said, "You won't take us that easy," meaning that he had an accomplice. She also noticed during last night's performance that the ropes around Archambault weren't broken, but the ends were cut. She also remembers that they only found the book about the Ingolstadt werewolves when Archambault knocked it off the shelf, suggesting that Archambault planted it there. With the facts added up, the gang realizes that Archambault was Doubleday's accomplice.

The gang pursue the train and they see Archambault attacking Marius to get to the box office money. Scooby, Shaggy, and Daphne were going to board the train to save Marius, but due to Scooby and Shaggy delaying, Daphne couldn't join them. Shaggy apologizes to Scooby for taking credit for his act. The two reconcile and free the baboons to aid them in stopping Archambault, and they subdue him using the tranquilizer darts.

As Archambault is taken away by the police, Marius informs the gang that Doubleday and Archambault had worked with his uncle for years, and they were angry when Marius took charge and decided to modernize the circus. When Doubleday got caught, Archambault double-crossed him in order to buy some time to get away with the jewels and the box office money.

At the end, Wulfric arrives and thanks the gang for recovering his jewel by giving them a private performance.

== Voice cast ==
- Frank Welker - Scooby-Doo, Fred Jones
- Matthew Lillard - Shaggy Rogers
- Grey DeLisle - Daphne Blake
- Mindy Cohn - Velma Dinkley
- Craig Ferguson - Whitney Doubleday
- Jess Harnell - Human Scooby-Doo, Guard
- Jim Meskimen - Phil Flaxman, Detective
- Peter Stormare - Wulfric von Rydingsvard
- Maurice LaMarche - Archambault
- Greg Ellis - Marius Brancusi
- Jeff Dunham - Schmatko, Conductor
- Carlos Ferro - Oliverio, Sisko
- Hynden Walch - Lena, Joan
- Candi Milo - Jean

== Home media ==
A combo pack featuring a Blu-ray, DVD, UltraViolet and digital download, as well as a single-disc DVD was released on October 9, 2012, by Warner Home Video. The film has been released to rent through Amazon Video. The DVD includes three bonus circus-themed episodes from various Scooby-Doo series.
