= Scooby-Doo! Abracadabra-Doo =

- DVD cover
- Directed by: Spike Brandt; Tony Cervone
- Screenplay by: Alan Burnett; Paul Dini; Misty Lee
- Story by: Alan Burnett
- Based on: Scooby-Doo by William Hanna, Joseph Barbera, Iwao Takamoto, Joe Ruby, & Ken Spears
- Produced by: Spike Brandt and Tony Cervone
- Starring: Frank Welker; Matthew Lillard; Mindy Cohn; Grey DeLisle
- Edited by: Jhoanne Reyes
- Music by: Robert J. Kral
- Production company: Warner Bros. Animation
- Distributed by: Warner Home Video
- Release date: February 16, 2010
- Running time: 75 minutes
- Country: United States
- Language: English

Scooby-Doo! Abracadabra-Doo is a 2010 direct-to-DVD animated comedy horror mystery fantasy film, and the fourteenth entry in a series of direct-to-video animated films based upon the Scooby-Doo Saturday morning cartoons. The film is directed by Spike Brandt and Tony Cervone. It was produced in 2009 by Warner Bros. Animation and it was released on February 16, 2010. It made its television debut on July 10, 2010, on Cartoon Network. The film performed well on iTunes, reaching the Top 10 on the Kids & Family film charts and the Top 40 on the iTunes film charts. The DVD sold 61,341 units in its first week and as of January 2013, it has sold approximately 433,000 units.

This marks the first Scooby-Doo animated film to feature Matthew Lillard voicing Shaggy Rogers (having previously played the character in the theatrical live-action Scooby-Doo films), as well as the first direct-to-video Scooby-Doo film since Scooby-Doo and the Cyber Chase not to feature Shaggy's original voice actor Casey Kasem as his voice. This marked the final Scooby-Doo role of John Stephenson before his death in 2015. This is also the first Scooby-Doo project to have Andrea Romano as the voice director since A Pup Named Scooby-Doo.

The art style and visuals are now in a different format, with a darker, more realistic look similar to Scooby-Doo on Zombie Island and Scooby-Doo! and the Witch's Ghost, and this marks the third film where the characters are in their original outfits and designs from the 1969 Scooby-Doo, Where Are You! series, followed by Scooby-Doo! and the Legend of the Vampire and Scooby-Doo! and the Monster of Mexico.

== Plot ==
After helping Mystery Inc. solve a factory mystery, Velma Dinkley receives a call from her mother to check on her younger sister Madelyn, a student of the Whirlen Merlin Magic Academy, after learning it is being terrorized by a gryphon. Upon their arrival, the gang meet Madelyn, who has a years-long crush on Shaggy Rogers; the academy's namesake Whirlen Merlin; his brother Marlon, the academy's cook and butler; Crystal, Whirlen's former stage assistant; Amos the groundskeeper; and Alma Rumblebuns, the school's head maid. They also learn that the gryphon has been scaring off students and staff.

Madelyn takes Shaggy on a tour of the school, explaining that the gryphon originally protected the castle the academy is based in before they are attacked by the beast. As the remaining students save for Madelyn leave, Mystery Inc. attend classes themselves. Amidst this, they learn of ice cream mogul Calvin Curdles' repeated attempts to buy the castle and suspect him of being behind the attacks. Velma and Daphne Blake soon find a secret passage leading to the school's attic, where they learn Rumblebuns used to date Curdles. Meanwhile, Madelyn finds a book on Lord O'Flannery, the castle's original owner who wielded a staff said to be able to control the gryphon and was laid to rest on a nearby island that is said to be haunted by a banshee. Despite this, the gang travel to O'Flannery's crypt and successfully recover the staff, but are chased off by the banshee before the gryphon attacks them. In the confusion, Shaggy and Madelyn lose the staff. She attempts to retrieve it, but is kidnapped by the gryphon. Concurrently, the others learn that Amos is secretly working for Curdles, but are forced to focus on saving Madelyn while Curdles renews his effort to make Whirlen sign over the castle.

While moving through the castle, they discover the Banshee is a hologram before the gryphon separates Shaggy and his dog Scooby-Doo from the others, who flee to get help. Nonetheless, Shaggy uses the staff to locate the gryphon's roost and rescue Madelyn before throwing it at the beast, causing it to lose control and eventually crash, revealing it was actually a puppet operated by Marlon via a blimp hidden by a fog machine. After discovering O'Flannery used hidden mechanical devices to make outsiders believe the castle was protected by a gryphon, Marlon restored them and created the banshee illusion to scare off trespassers. Having grown tired of Whirlen taking credit for his work, Marlon sought to use the devices to go solo, but was forced to use them to facilitate Curdles' plot to make the necessary capital. Marlon subsequently apologizes, which Whirlen accepts. Additionally, Velma reveals Amos knew of Marlon's work with the gryphon and told Curdles, who reveals further he wanted the castle to win back Rumblebuns.

Afterward, Curdles and Rumblebuns renew their relationship, the Merlin brothers make Madelyn their apprentice, and Curdles sponsors the academy's reopening.

== Voice cast ==
- Frank Welker as Fred Jones and Scooby-Doo
- Matthew Lillard as Shaggy Rogers
- Grey DeLisle as Daphne Blake
- Mindy Cohn as Velma Dinkley
- Danica McKellar as Madelyn Dinkley
- James Patrick Stuart as Whirlen Merlin
- Brian Posehn as Marlon Merlin
- Diane Delano as Alma Rumblebuns
- Jeffrey Tambor as Calvin Curdles
- Crystal Scales as Crystal
- John DiMaggio as Amos
- Dave Attell as G.P.S.
- Olivia Hack as Treena
- Dee Bradley Baker as Sherman
- Melique Berger as Maxwell's Mother
- John Stephenson as Sheriff

== EP ==
An EP soundtrack was released exclusively to iTunes Stores in the U.S. on September 14, 2010.

1. "Scooby Abracadabra-Doo" - 2:11
2. "Magic" - 2:06
3. "Tomorrow" - 2:13
