= Scooby-Doo! Legend of the Phantosaur =

- DVD cover
- Based on: Scooby-Doo by Joe Ruby and Ken Spears
- Written by: Doug Langdale
- Directed by: Ethan Spaulding
- Starring: Frank Welker; Mindy Cohn; Grey DeLisle; Matthew Lillard; John DiMaggio; Michael Gough; Matthew Gray Gubler; Finola Hughes; Maulik Pancholy; Kevin Michael Richardson; Fred Willard; Dave Wittenberg; Gwendoline Yeo
- Music by: Robert J. Kral
- Country of origin: United States
- Original language: English

Production
- Producers: Spike Brandt; Tony Cervone
- Running time: 75 minutes
- Production company: Warner Bros. Animation

Original release
- Release: September 6, 2011

Scooby-Doo! Legend of the Phantosaur is a 2011 American animated mystery television film based on Scooby-Doo. The film was released on September 6, 2011.

== Plot ==
After Shaggy Rogers discovers he has a disorder that causes him to irrationally overreact to frightening stimuli, he fears that he can no longer remain involved with Mystery Inc. His friends take him to a spa in the town of La Serena to help him calm down. There, they meet the spa's owner and hypnotherapist, Mr. Hubley, along with paleontologist Professor Svankmajer and her assistant Winsor, who are overseeing a paleontological dig. When a large "ghost dinosaur" attacks the site, Shaggy becomes paralyzed with fear, though Scooby-Doo rescues him before Fred Jones uses Mystery Inc.'s van, the Mystery Machine, to knock the dinosaur off of a cliff.

Hubley explains the ghost dinosaur was the "Phantosaur", which legend says was summoned by Native Americans to regain their land from European colonists, before hypnotizing Shaggy into switching between his regular personality and a fearless persona when he hears a specific keyword, "Bad," and to forget the word in question. However, due to Hubley accidentally hypnotizing himself to forget the word as well, nobody remembers what the keyword is. As Fred, Daphne Blake, and Velma Dinkley investigate the dig site for dinosaur tracks and what appear to be snake trails, Shaggy fights a biker gang at a buffet and is invited to join a motorcycle race after hearing the keyword. Later that day, Daphne and Fred witness members of a mining company retrieving a dinosaur tooth. Before the race, Daphne teaches Shaggy how to ride a motorcycle. Upon hearing the keyword once more, Shaggy takes part in the race and rescues the bikers' leader, Tex, from falling off a cliff, earning his respect. Suddenly, the Phantosaur and a group of Velociraptors interrupt the race.

Meanwhile, Daphne, Fred, and Velma notice a van owned by the mining company containing cables and whose tires match the snake trails they found earlier. They and the bikers soon flood the van, revealing the Phantosaur was an animatronic operated by someone they believe wanted to scare off Svankmajer's team so they can tap into a silver mine. When Hubley arrives, saying his hypnotherapy equipment was stolen, Mystery Inc. try to investigate further, only to encounter another Phantosaur before it disappears.

The next day, the group head to the mine to present their evidence to Svankmajer, who reveals her camp was attacked and claims she sent Winsor home and intends to leave as well. However, the group soon realize that Svankmajer hired graduate students to pose as the Velociraptors, the second Phantosaur was a projection that she and Winsor created using Hubley's stolen equipment, and super-heated air and paint strippers were used to achieve the animatronic Phantosaur's fire breath. Svankmajer reveals her team had found a dinosaur skeleton preserved in quartz crystal and sought to scare off La Serena's citizens so they could claim it for themselves. Though the paint strippers set off explosives that the paleontologists intended to seal off the mine with, Shaggy overcomes his fear and gets outside to gain help from Tex's gang in rescuing the others.

Afterward, Svankmajer and her team are arrested while Shaggy is unhypnotized, only for Hubley to accidentally hypnotize the rest of Mystery Inc. into believing they are Shaggy.

== Voice cast ==
- Frank Welker as Scooby-Doo, Fred Jones and misc. bikers
- Matthew Lillard as Shaggy Rogers and Shaky Joe
- Mindy Cohn as Velma Dinkley
- Grey DeLisle as Daphne Blake
- Cathy Cavadini as Faith
- John DiMaggio as Fritz, GPS and misc. bikers
- Michael Gough as Mr. Babbit, Blair, Grad Student #1 and misc. bikers
- Matthew Gray Gubler as Winsor
- Finola Hughes as Professor Svankmajer
- Maulik Pancholy as Doctor
- Kevin Michael Richardson as Tex, Cop #2, Grad Student #3 and misc. bikers
- Fred Willard as Mr. Hubley
- Dave Wittenberg as Cop #1, Grad Student #2, Policeman and misc. bikers
- Gwendoline Yeo as Ms. Detich

== Reception ==
Common Sense Media gave it 3 out of 5 stars, but said that it was "too spooky for young kids" recommending it for ages 7 and over.

== Ultra Instinct Shaggy meme ==
On October 12, 2017, YouTube user Midya uploaded a video titled "Ultra Instinct Shaggy," consisting of an edited scene from the film of Shaggy fighting Tex's biker gang. The title is in reference to the anime series Dragon Ball Super, from which the Ultra Instinct form (a powered-up state where the user can react to attacks instinctively) originated; the video makes use of the "Kyūkyoku no Battle" track and slows down the footage at certain points so that Shaggy appears to have gained the power. It quickly went viral and became part of a wave of memes depicting Shaggy with superhuman or even godlike abilities, often requiring only a small percentage of his power to perform inhuman tasks or to defeat ostensibly more powerful opponents. Variations of the meme use frames from a behind-the-scenes featurette of the 2002 film Scooby-Doo with fake subtitles describing Shaggy's power.

The meme's popularity coincided with the development of Mortal Kombat 11, and a petition consequently launched on Change.org to include Shaggy as DLC. The petition received thousands of signatures and received the attention of Mortal Kombat co-creator Ed Boon and Shaggy's voice actor Matthew Lillard. Lillard also tweeted posts and retweeted fan art in support of the idea and Boon jokingly petitioned to include Scooby-Doo in Injustice 2. It was later confirmed that Shaggy would not appear in any Mortal Kombat games.

The meme was referenced in the animated film Mortal Kombat Legends: Battle of the Realms. During its intro, Shaggy, surrounded by a glowing aura and with glowing green eyes, appears from the Warner Bros. Animation logo and grabs Scorpion, referencing the latter's catchphrase and attacks. It is later referenced in the video game MultiVersus, which features Shaggy as a playable character; in the game, he gains superpowers after eating what appears to be rock candy, and some of his lines reference the meme, including a verbatim quote from the film.

== See also ==
- List of films featuring dinosaurs
