= List of Voltron: Legendary Defender episodes =

The following is a list of episodes from the series Voltron: Legendary Defender. The first season was released on June 10, 2016. The first episode in Netflix is triple-length, creating a cumulative runtime for the season equal to the industry standard of 13 episodes, while other streaming services such as iTunes and Amazon have three separated episodes with the normal length of 23 minutes. The second season was released on January 20, 2017, the third season was released on August 4, 2017, and the fourth season was released on October 13, 2017. A fifth season was released on March 2, 2018, while the sixth season was released on June 15, 2018. A seventh season was released on August 10, 2018. The eighth and final season was released on December 14, 2018.

== Series overview ==
Season	Episodes	Originally released	
Season	Episodes	North America	South Korea
1	13	June 10, 2016	February 2, 2019 (as Season 1)
2	13	January 20, 2017	February 2, 2019 (as Season 1)
3	7	August 4, 2017	December 21, 2019 (as Season 2)
4	6	October 13, 2017	December 21, 2019 (as Season 2)
5	6	March 2, 2018	December 21, 2019 (as Season 2)
6	7	June 15, 2018	December 21, 2019 (as Season 2)
7	13	August 10, 2018	December 3, 2020 (as Season 3)
8	13	December 14, 2018	December 3, 2020 (as Season 3)

== Episodes ==
=== Season 1 (2016) ===
No. overall	No. in season	Title	Directed by	Written by
1–3	1–3	The Rise of Voltron" "Part 1: The New Alliance" "Part 2: From Days of Long Ago" "Part 3: Defenders of the Universe	Joaquim Dos Santos; Lauren Montgomery; Ki Hyun Ryu; Eugene Lee; Steve In-Chang Ahn	Tim Hedrick; Joshua Hamilton; May Chan
An expedition on the moon Kerberos is attacked and the crew imprisoned by a hostile alien craft from the Galra Empire. On Earth, they are presumed dead. One year later on Earth, Garrison cadets Lance, Pidge and Hunk witness a vessel crash land and learn that it contains one of the missing expedition members, Shiro, who has been quarantined by officials. As they form a rescue plan, an academy washout known as Keith (who has an UGLY mullet) arrives and rescues Shiro before the five of them escape into the desert. Shiro is unable to remember anything from his captivity, but the group are able to determine that the Galra are searching for a weapon known as "Voltron". They find a large robotic blue lion in the desert and learn that it is only one of five lions that form Voltron. The Blue Lion accepts Lance as its pilot and takes the five through a wormhole to the Castle of Lions on Arus, where they find Princess Allura, her royal advisor Coran and four space mice in cryostasis. Upon awakening, Allura is shocked to discover that 10,000 years have passed since they were placed in cryostasis. Haggar, advisor of Zarkon, leader of the Galra Empire, senses Allura's return and Zarkon sends Galra troops commanded by Sendak after them. Allura names the others as Voltron Paladins, bestows them with armor and bayards (the Paladins' weapons) and tasks them with finding the other lions. Lance and Hunk retrieve the Yellow Lion while Shiro accompanies Pidge to find the Green Lion. The Red Lion, unfortunately, is in the hands of the very Galra ship advancing on Arus. Unsure of whether to run or fight, Allura consults the artificial intelligence formed by the memories of her father, King Alfor, who admits he was wrong to hide Voltron and encourages her to fight. Keith, Shiro and Pidge infiltrate the ship so Keith can find the Red Lion while Shiro and Pidge, who repurposes a Galra drone dubbed "Rover", search the ship for prisoners, revealing to them that Pidge's father and brother were the other missing astronauts from the Kerberos mission Shiro was on. With the other four lions retrieved, the Black Lion is released from the Castle and selects Shiro as its Paladin. All five lions unite to form Voltron and destroy Sendak's ship before accepting their new roles as the Defenders of the Universe.
4	4	"Some Assembly Required"	Joaquim Dos Santos; Lauren Montgomery; Ki Hyun Ryu	Tim Hedrick
When the Paladins are unable to form Voltron during a training session, Coran puts them through his own rigorous training in order to build a sense of brotherhood and trust between the Paladins. However, the Paladins fail miserably and are unable to connect. It is not until the Paladins engage in a food fight with Allura and Coran that they finally begin to work as a team and are successfully able to form Voltron.
5	5	"Return of the Gladiator"	Eugene Lee	Joshua Hamilton
As the Castle of Lions prepare for departure, the team is met by the arrival of a local Arusian. Allura heads to meet the villagers along with Coran, Hunk, Keith and Lance while Pidge and Shiro tend to the rescued prisoners from the Galra battleship. From them, they learn that Shiro was a champion fighter in the gladiator ring that he and Pidge's brother, Matt were forced to fight in and that Shiro seemingly attacked Matt in bloodlust. Pidge and Shiro head to the crashed Galra battleship they had destroyed to retrieve prisoner logs, but are interrupted by the arrival of a Robeast created by Haggar to defeat Voltron. During the fight, Shiro remembers the Robeast as the Galra warrior he defeated in battle and is able to use his previous tactics to defeat it. Keith uses his bayard to form Voltron's sword, allowing Voltron to deliver the finishing blow. Afterwards, Shiro reveals to Pidge that he remembered attacking Matt so that he wouldn't be forced to fight and instead be sent to a work camp with his father. Pidge apologizes to Shiro and it is revealed Pidge's real name is Katie. With the defeat of the Robeast, Sendak is tasked with acquiring Voltron.
6	6	"Fall of the Castle of Lions"	Steve In-Chang Ahn	Tim Hedrick
The team and Arusians celebrate Voltron's victory in the castle, but the festivities come to a halt when Pidge reveals her intentions to leave the team and search for her missing father and brother. As the team tries to convince Pidge to stay, Haxus, one of Sendak's soldiers, is able to sneak a bomb drone disguised as Rover into the castle, causing it to destroy the crystal that powers the entire castle and severely injure Lance in the process. Coran and Hunk leave to acquire a new crystal, Keith and Allura rush to the Arusian village as it is being attacked by the Galra while Shiro and Pidge remain at the castle with Lance. The attack on the Arusian village was however a distraction and Sendak attacks and overpowers Shiro and takes over the castle. Pidge evades capture and with Allura's guidance is able to sabotage the Galra's efforts to launch the Castle. Meanwhile, Hunk and Coran arrive at a nearby Balmera, a large petrified creature the size of a planet from which the Alteans acquire crystals. They discover that it has been taken over by the Galra and crash in the subterranean mines.
7	7	"Tears of the Balmera"	Chris Palmer	Joshua Hamilton
Hunk and Coran meet local Balmerans, Shay and Rax, who help them hide from the Galra. Shay admires the two and wants to help them, but Rax is cautious and insists they leave. Hunk and Coran are able to sneak past the Galra to find a crystal, but are captured and imprisoned. Shay helps them escape with the crystal, but is captured by the Galra after her brother informs them of Shay's actions. Hunk promises to return and save her people before he and Coran return to Arus. Still trapped outside the castle, Keith and Allura are unable to help Pidge take back the Castle. With Allura's guidance, Pidge is able to continually sabotage the Castle's systems to further delay Sendak's take off. She sends Haxus falling to his death, taking Rover with him. In flashback, Katie Holt watches the news in horror as she learns of her father and brother's apparent demise on the mission to Kerberos. Katie breaks into the Galaxy Garrison and accesses Commander Iverson's files of the mission. When she is caught by Iverson, she presses him about the crash despite probes showing no evidence one but Iverson reprimands her and bans her from ever entering the Garrison again. Some time later, Katie enrolls in the Garrison, but cuts her hair and wears glasses, passing herself off as a male student named Pidge Gunderson. The space mice are able to take down the particle barrier, allowing Allura and Keith to enter the Castle and help Pidge against Sendak. With Lance in recovery and Sendak imprisoned, Pidge decides to remain on the team.
8	8	"Taking Flight"	Eugene Lee	Tim Hedrick
The team welcomes Lance back after a period in the healing pod before deciding on their next move. Hunk brings up the plight of Shay and her people; prompting them to launch a liberation mission. Pidge also finally gets a weight off her shoulders by revealing her gender to the rest of the group. On the way to the Balmera, the team stops to help two rebels, Rolo and Nyma, on the run from the Galra. While the others are open and trusting to the pair, Hunk is cautious and guarded and eager to get to Balmera as soon as possible. Lance flirts with Nyma, who convinces him to take her for a ride in the Blue Lion, but once they are alone, Nyma ties Lance to a tree while she and Rolo take off with the Lion. The other Paladins pursue them into an asteroid field and Keith is able to flush them out and they reclaim the Blue Lion. Rolo and Nyma are left stranded once more, but Rolo expresses gratitude for the Paladins sparing their lives and genuinely hopes that they can defeat Zarkon.
9	9	"Return to the Balmera"	Steve In-Chang Ahn	May Chan
Allura, Coran and the Paladins return to the Balmera to free the natives, but must hold back their firepower so as not to hurt the Balmera. Shiro and Pidge scout for Galran forces, who are strangely absent, while Lance and Keith work to disable a Galran fleet of ships. Hunk searches for the prisons and is able to find Shay's family, including her brother Rax, but learns that she was taken by the Galra to the heart of the Balmera after they arrived. The Paladins make their way to the Balmera's core to rescue her, but fall into a trap. Shay uses the Balmera to transmit a message to her family, who are able to free them with the Balmera's help. The Paladins form Voltron and are able destroy the Galran fleet, but their victory is short-lived by the arrival of another Robeast.
10	10	"Rebirth"	Chris Palmer	Joshua Hamilton
The Paladins scramble to battle the new Robeast, whose omni-directional view and multi-firing ability make it difficult for Voltron to counter, forcing them to retreat to the tunnels below and regroup. They learn that the Balmera is dying and unless they leave, everything on the Balmera will die as well. Though the Balmerans are reluctant to leave their home, Allura convinces them to flee to safety. The Paladins distract the Robeast while the Balmerans climb to the surface to escape on the Castle-ship. However, the Balmera's waning life force causes structural damage to the tunnels, leaving many of the Balmerans trapped. Unable to fully evacuate, Allura decides to perform an ancient ritual once performed by her people to rejuvenate the Balmeran. Hunk's bayard forms a large shoulder cannon for Voltron, granting the Paladins equal fire power against the Robeast, but they are still unable to defeat it. With help from the Balmerans, Allura's ritual is able to revive the Balmera, which defeats the Robeast by encasing it in crystal, but she passes out from exhausting her energy.
11	11	"Crystal Venom"	Eugene Lee	May Chan
As Allura recovers, she spends her time enjoying the company of her father's artificial intelligence. With Sendak in custody, they decide to draw out his memories in order to learn information about Zarkon and the Galra empire. While waiting, the Castle begins displaying strange behavior: Hunk and Pidge are attacked by malfunctioning kitchen equipment and later stuck in zero-G, Lance is locked in a cryo chamber and later almost sucked out of an air lock while Keith is attacked by a rogue training droid. Keith opens a door in the airlock and the rogue training droid is sucked out, and he saves Lance before closing the airlock. Shiro monitors Sendak and begins interrogating him, but is mentally tormented by Sendak's voice prompting him to eject Sendak into space. Coran concludes that Alfor's AI has been corrupted by the lingering effects of the Galran crystal as they try to stop Allura, convinced that Alfor is taking her back to Altea, from driving the Castle-ship into an imploding star, before Coran brings her back to her senses. At the urging of the Alfor AI, Allura tearfully destroys her father's memories in order to save the ship. Despite the loss, Allura stands strong and maintains that Voltron is her father's legacy.
12	12	"Collection and Extraction"	Steve In-Chang Ahn	Tim Hedrick
While combing through Sendak's memories, the team discovers the location of a secret Galran transport hub. Allura joins the Paladins in infiltrating the station in order to extract information, but find nothing useful. When another ship arrives, Allura decides to infiltrate the ship herself to extract its information by making use of her Altean ability to change her skin color and height, allowing her to resemble a Galran soldier. Shiro accompanies her, unwilling to let her go alone as well as needing his hand to access Galran technology. While waiting, the Paladins spot one of the Druids with two large containers of yellow fluid. Keith pursues them and Coran discovers that the Galrans have found a new way to harvest Quintessence, a form of fuel that has also allowed Zarkon to live 10,000 years. Keith is discovered and battles the druid, but is injured by the druid's lightning only to be healed by the yellow fluid before escaping in Pidge's Green Lion. Shiro and Allura are also discovered and flee to the escape pods, but Allura sacrifices herself to allow Shiro to escape and she is captured by the Galra.
13	13	"The Black Paladin"	Chris Palmer	Joshua Hamilton
With Allura's capture, the Paladins are quick to mount a rescue mission. When they arrive, Zarkon activates a particle barrier, trapping them inside. Voltron is quick to destroy most of the Galran forces, but are forcibly separated somehow by Zarkon and Haggar. The Paladins scramble to rescue Allura while Shiro is suddenly ejected from the Black Lion. As he tries to get back to his lion, he encounters Haggar and is easily overwhelmed by her powers, only to be rescued by Allura and Hunk. Zarkon moves to claim the Black Lion, revealing himself as the original Black Paladin of Voltron, but Keith intercepts and battles him, against Coran's advice. Zarkon easily overpowers Keith's Red Lion with his mastery over the black bayard, being able to form a multitude of different weapons in an instant. Before Zarkon can kill Keith, Shiro rescues him with the Black Lion. The Castle-ship is unable to form a wormhole to escape, until suddenly one of Zarkon's commanders destroys the sentries guarding the barrier generator and shuts it down. As they escape through a wormhole, Haggar hits it with her lightning, causing the portal to become unstable. The lions are separated from the Castle-ship in the wormhole, each of them falling to parts unknown.

=== Season 2 (2017) ===
No. overall	No. in season	Title	Directed by	Written by
14	1	"Across the Universe"	Steve In-Chang Ahn	May Chan
The lions fall out of the wormhole in different places, while Coran and Allura are trapped in a seemingly endless time loop that makes Coran younger and the mice into different creatures. Meanwhile, Zarkon seeks to uncover the person responsible for the Paladins' escape. Pidge exits the corrupted wormhole in a junk nebula with debris from various alien technologies, which she uses to send a homing beacon to the Castle, thus breaking the time loop. Keith and Shiro crash on a nearly dead moon. With Shiro growing weaker from the wound Haggar inflicted on him in the previous episode, they work together to survive the local wildlife until their lions are back on-line.
15	2	"The Depths"	Eugene Lee	Joshua Hamilton
Hunk and Lance crash-land underwater and follow a mermaid to a civilization whose queen promises to keep them safe and help find the others. While resting, Lance is kidnapped by a trio of mer-people who believe the queen to be mind-controlling the populace. Only after freeing Hunk of the control and capturing the queen do they realize that the queen was also mind-controlled and the Baku, which was a food source to the people, was really an alien predator beast. Lance channels a new weapon from his Blue Lion and kills the Baku, and as a thank-you the queen uses the old energy beacon, which brings Pidge to their rescue.
16	3	"Shiro's Escape"	Chris Palmer	Tim Hedrick
Following the team's reformation after the corrupted wormhole jump, Shiro is in a recovery pod and vividly dreams of the day he escaped. A Galra scientist named Ulaz released Shiro, and instructed him to get back to Earth and find Voltron. Shiro also relates that not all Galra are evil, as a Galra was the previous Black Paladin of Voltron. Finding space coordinates in Shiro's artificial arm, the Paladins locate Ulaz, who reveals he is part of an order known as the Blade of Marmora, who are hidden within many ranks of Zarkon's Empire. Prorok, who is remade into a Ro-Beast, finds the Paladins and quickly gains the upper hand, until Ulaz sacrifices himself to destroy the monster. Before his death, Ulaz gives the team the location of the Blade of Marmora's headquarters; Shiro and the group decide to wait on journeying there until they learn how Zarkon is tracking them. In his room, Keith holds a small dagger he has had since childhood, which bears the crest of Marmora.
17	4	"Greening the Cube"	Eugene Lee	Lars Kenseth
While making repairs to the Castle, the Paladins encounter unusual spongy spores that lead them to a planet of brilliant engineers — the Olkari. When landing, Team Voltron meet the Olkari people in the forest, where they adapted from machine- to nature-based technologies. When rescuing the Olkarian king Lubos, Team Voltron find he willingly sold out his people as slaves to live in comfort, while his people build a super-weapon for Zarkon's forces. Voltron engages the super-weapon cube, which learns and adapts to their attacks, even replicating them. When Voltron attempts to slice the cube, it splits into four. After Pidge has help from the Olkari, she reconnects to her Green Lion in a way that allows her to summon a new weapon, which when the Black Cubes attempt to clone, instead causes them to grow massive plant roots and fall to the ground. When leaving Olkarian space, the Castle of Lions is intercepted by a Galra war fleet.
18	5	"Eye of the Storm"	Steve In-Chang Ahn	Joshua Hamilton
Exhausted after a battle, the crew must spring back into action when Zarkon's forces track them down. Though they manage to escape, their wormhole generator begins malfunctioning while in slipstream because of broken teludav lenses. Coran gets a case of the Slipperies, an Altean flu which causes profuse sweating all over. When Team Voltron attempt some rest — Lance and Keith try to make it to a pool, Hunk makes transparent blue cookies, Pidge learns beginner Altaean, and Shiro is on watch — Zarkon's ship discovers them again, and another battle and jump leaves them without any more crystal lenses needed for another wormhole. When the Castle hides in a cosmic storm cloud, Allura comes to the conclusion that Zarkon is following them by tracking her energies. In engineering, Coran details what type of lens material they need, and Pidge remembers that Hunk's cookies are that very substance. Coran positions the paladins holding the cookie-lenses in a unique fashion INSIDE the wormhole generator in order for it to properly function. Using his Slipperies, Coran shines the lenses, which fully jumps the Castle away from Zarkon.
19	6	"The Ark of Taujeer"	Chris Palmer	Mark Bemesderfer
On the ravaged planet of Taujeer, Galra commander Morvok strips the planet of resources and prevents the citizens' escape. Allura and Keith, who also believes himself to be the means of Zarkon's tracking, go off on a separate mission to learn how Zarkon is actually locating them; and on their isolated trip debate whether any Galra people are even fighting Zarkon's rule. The remaining four Paladins arrive on Taujeer to help the Ark escape, only to be fired upon by Galra forces closest to them, as Zarkon located them nonetheless. When Keith and Allura are summoned by Coran, Keith tries to use the booster jets to arrive sooner, but ends up destroying the pod instead. Hunk activates a new power-up for his Yellow Lion, which prevents the Ark from falling into a lake of acid. The Red Lion ventures into space to Keith and Allura's position and retrieves them to form Voltron, which defeats the Galra ship. After saving the Ark and resting in the Castle, it is apparent to them now that Zarkon is following them by way of his old connection to the Black Lion.
20	7	"Space Mall"	Eugene Lee	Tim Hedrick
Shiro attempts to create a deeper bond with the Black Lion, while Coran takes the others to a swap meet, where they have some strange adventures. After Coran details his time in the swap meets as edgy and filled with space pirates, they arrive and find it to resemble an average mall on Earth. Varkon, a bumbling mall rent-a-cop, sees the four Paladins drop their terrible disguises and pursues them through the mall. Keith goes to a knife salesman for information on the blade he has, but learns it is from an extinct people. Hunk is made to work off a tab for Sal, the owner of Vrepit Sal's diner, but has to eventually run from Varkon. Pidge and Lance find a shop which sells Earth material from the 1980s. They all eventually meet up with Coran, who has the lenses. Meanwhile, the Black Lion reveals how it was created, and how Zarkon and Alfor were once friends. Zarkon then connects to Shiro on the psychic plane, but Shiro's words of trusting his Lion earn its protection and defeat of Zarkon in the psychic plane. Waking up, Zarkon loses more connection to the Black Lion and Shiro is now more connected to it. Afterwards, knowing Zarkon can no longer track them, Shiro orders the Castle to the headquarters of the Blade of Marmora.
21	8	"The Blade of Marmora"	Steve In-Chang Ahn	Mark Bemesderfer
When Team Voltron reaches the headquarters of the Blade of Marmora, they find it located in a safe spot between two black holes and a blue Supergiant star. Keith and Shiro travel to the Marmorans' base in an effort to align with the Blade of Marmora, led by Kolivan and his lieutenant, Antok. But Keith's possession of one of their blades causes immediate friction, with the Trials of Marmora to resolve them with one of two results: knowledge or death. Keith must fight to unlock his past, and with each fight exhausts himself more and more. When entering a vision of his old home with his father, the outside of the house shows a Galra invasion, giving Keith a choice: stay and learn, or leave and rescue. The Red Lion attacks the base, sensing Keith's endangerment; and, deciding to end the Marmorans' mistrust and gain their alliance, Keith relents his dagger, only for it to awaken its true form of a saber upon his enlightened decision and reveal a truth: Keith has part Galra ancestry. Meanwhile, Commander Thace (the Marmoran spy who shut down the Solar Shield) alerts the Order that the investigation is increasing and the timetable must escalate to now.
22	9	"The Belly of the Weblum"	Chris Palmer	Joshua Hamilton
The Paladins split up to gather resources for a showdown with Zarkon. Hunk and Keith -the latter dealing with the fact that Allura now views him with contempt since learning he was part Galran- travel into the belly of the planet-devouring creature known as a Weblum for scaultrite, a material needed in wormhole generators. While there, they see that the instructions Coran made are dated to when he was in university and are corroded. The duo successfully enter the Weblum, but are separated after the first stomach, leaving Keith in the second and Hunk in the Weblum's bloodstream. In the second stomach, Keith finds a trapped, silent Galra pilot who helps him journey through the third stomach to reach the scaultrite. As the Weblum's defenses flare, the only way to make the scaultrite is for Hunk to threaten the beast enough outside to form the crystals. Upon the Weblum firing its beam, Keith packs more than enough scaultrite, but the Galran with him holds him up for a single full bag, and escapes. Keith thanks Hunk for his efforts, and Hunk pokes fun at Keith's newly learned Galra ancestry.
23	10	"Escape from Beta Traz"	Eugene Lee	Mitch Iverson
By the information provided by the Blade of Marmora, Lance, Pidge and Shiro infiltrate a facility to free the only prisoner of the Galra Space Station Beta Traz. Upon successful infiltration, Pidge locates two cells instead of the one they were informed of. Pidge stays in the Main Command Center, but Lance and Shiro must reach and connect to the isolated Third level holding the two prisoners. Lance obtains a 3D render of a Galra officer for the facial recognition. They each think they've found the right inmate, but it gets harder to tell as Pidge goes radio silent when the station warden goes to the Command Center. Lance escorts his choice out, while Shiro deals with his inmate, Slav, being impossible because of his predicting statistical probabilities of his death from the smallest thing. While Pidge is disabling the remaining security features, she finds footage of her brother Matt's escape. When the gravity is shut off, Shiro with Slav regroups with Lance, who learns he actually has the warden's personal pet Laika. In the hangar, everyone is regrouped but the Warden overpowers them until Slav opens the hangar doors to save the Paladins. Lance uses his aim to save Slav from the Warden and the mission is a success.
24	11	"Stayin' Alive"	Steve In-Chang Ahn	May Chan
Allura travels to the Balmera to acquire a powerful crystal. When she is about to leave with the crystal, the panoptic Ro-Beast from their last encounter prompts her to call on the Paladins for help. The creature, now merged with part of the encasing crystal it was once in, makes its way to the Castle as Allura goes skyward to protect the Balmera. Allura warps in the Paladins, who regroup to their Lions to form Voltron. As they fight the Ro-beast, the team utilize their new weapons to subdue it, and Voltron finally destroys the monster. Back on board the Castle, it is more apparent that the fact that Hunk and Keith were successful in their part of the mission doesn't change anything in Allura's distrust of the latter. On the Olkarian home world, the super teludav is operational, and the team reminisce about their time since coming together. Meanwhile, Thace makes the error of returning for a spy device he planted, only for the Druids to intercept and capture him.
25	12	"Best Laid Plans"	Chris Palmer	Joshua Hamilton
After acquiring the teludav from Olkari, the team prepares to launch the operation to defeat Zarkon and bring peace to the universe. When the Marmorans haven't heard from Thace, they urge a delay in action, while Allura argues they continue. Keith plans to infiltrate the main ship of the Galran Fleet, but before he leaves, Allura stops him to apologize for ever doubting him, explaining that since waking up she views the Paladins as her new family, and her blind hatred of the Galra combined with Keith being part Galran made her unsure. Following Thace's capture, the Druids interrogate him, and allow him to escape. Haggar helps Zarkon find the Black Lion, Zarkon's fleet arrives, and Shiro distracts them while Keith sneaks aboard. Despite the battle being a trap, Zarkon is too engrossed in reclaiming the Black Lion. Since the Druids rewrote the shield codes, the plan adapts to turn the core room into a bomb and cripple Zarkon's ship. While the Druids are sent after Thace, Zarkon has a rematch with Team Voltron. Thace sacrifices himself to cause the power core to overload and explode, just as the super teludav loses its cloak, and Zarkon's ship loses power. As Zarkon's ship is wormholed to another reach of the universe far away, the Paladins pursue to finally defeat Zarkon.
26	13	"Blackout"	Eugene Lee	Tim Hedrick
The Paladins fight to systematically destroy the base to prevent Zarkon's return. As Zarkon himself goes to battle Voltron, Haggar and her Druids go to protect their emperor as he readies his armor, which untested could kill him as well as Voltron. Before Zarkon can do anything, Haggar uses her dark magic to forcefully remove the Quintessence from Voltron, but is overloaded by the purity of Voltron. While the Lions are unresponsive, their Paladins still live, but Zarkon arrives in a Ro-beast in his image. Allura uses whatever power she can to stall Zarkon to allow the Paladins to recover and battle Zarkon's Ro-beast, nearly resulting in her own demise when Zarkon deflects her attack back at the Castle, critically damaging and disabling it. Somehow surviving, Allura, Kolivan and Antok go to battle Haggar to keep her from using her witchcraft from delaying Voltron. As their battles rage, Zarkon splits Voltron back into the individual Lions; Allura and Kolivan triumph in their fights, while Antok perishes at the hand of Haggar and another Druid. Shiro awakens to see his team being beaten, and the Bayard access port in his Black Lion activates, in turn activating its Transcendent Wings to phase through Zarkon's Ro-Beast and reclaim the original Black Bayard. As their fight continues, Haggar is revealed to be Altaean; Allura learns that she herself has the power to command Quintessence, which she uses to defeat Haggar and destroy the Komar, the base's Quintessence harvester/weapon; and Kolivan avenges Antok. Forming Voltron, the Paladins fight with new strength, and Shiro uses his Bayard to supercharge the Voltron Sword and destroy Zarkon's Ro-Beast armor. After the battle, the Paladins discover that Shiro has vanished from the Black Lion, leaving the bayard behind. On Zarkon's ship, Zarkon is on life support, prompting Haggar to summon Prince Lotor.

=== Season 3 (2017) ===
No. overall	No. in season	Title	Directed by	Written by
27	1	"Changing of the Guard"	Steve In-Chang Ahn	Tim Hedrick
The Paladins must adjust to using only their lions until they can figure out a new means to form Voltron. As they free the people of Puiga, Zarkon's son Lotor takes over the empire in his place, and covertly begins a nefarious plan.
28	2	"Red Paladin"	Chris Palmer	May Chan
Team Voltron shuffle who now pilots which Lions: Keith takes the Black Lion, Lance takes over for Keith's Red Lion, and Allura is chosen by the Blue Lion. Lotor traps the Paladins over Puiga to study their team dynamic after Zarkon's defeat, and pulls out of battle after learning what he wants to know.
29	3	"The Hunted"	Eugene Lee	Joshua Hamilton
Keith, in burning pursuit of Lotor, is easily tricked into following the prince to a storm planet where their sensors malfunction. Keith's blind pursuit causes everyone to separate, but Allura syncs with the Blue Lion and outmaneuvers Lotor to escape and form Voltron. Keith, now focused on his new responsibilities as leader, allows Lotor to escape so as to regroup.
30	4	"Hole in the Sky"	Chris Palmer	Tim Hedrick
The team comes across an Altean vessel lodged in a spatial anomaly and pass through it to study. Upon crossing, they find themselves in an alternate universe where the Alteans defeated the Galra 10,000 years ago and have conquered the known universe to "bring peace". They learn that a comet with multi-dimensional properties is made of the same material that makes up Voltron, and if the Alteans get it, they'll be able to conquer other realities. The team, alongside the Guns of Gamora, including Slav and Sven (Shiro's counterpart), work to steal the comet and return to their reality. Upon returning, Lotor takes the comet with ease from the tired Paladins.
31	5	"The Journey"	Steve In-Chang Ahn	Joshua Hamilton
Shiro wakes up with longer hair & facial hair in a Galra cruiser and escapes. Unbeknownst to him, the commander speaks of an "Operation: KURON" where they let him escape. Shiro then lands on an ice planet and meets two rebels who give him a shuttle. Shiro uses the shuttle to stealthily re-board the cruiser and makes his way to Voltron. After a week of open travel in space, Keith finds Shiro and takes him home.
32	6	"Tailing a Comet"	Chris Palmer	Mitch Iverson
Lotor's four Generals attack a Galra base to steal a Teludav lens (from episode "Blackout") and the team barely survive a battle with Lotor's forces, where Keith realizes one of the generals is the Galra that was trapped in the Weblum. When Keith is confronted with the difficult choice of pursuing Lotor or destroying the Teludav, he tricks Lotor's generals into a shoot and miss, destroying the Teludav and leaving Lotor open to attack. However, the generals manage to escape.
33	7	"The Legend Begins"	Eugene Lee	Tim Hedrick
At the Castle, Coran explains to everyone the true origin of Voltron and the Paladins: King Alfor and Zarkon, despite differences between their peoples, worked united in the defense of their kingdoms. When celebrating a battle victory on Zarkon's homeworld of Daibazaal, a comet lands not far from them made from multi-dimensional properties, which Alfor used to build Voltron. When evil erupted, Alfor & Zarkon came to pilot the Red and Black Lions respectively; with their friends Lady Trigel of the Dalterion Belt, Blaytz of Nalquod and Gyrgan of Rygnirath piloting the Green, Blue and Yellow Lions respectively. Zarkon's wife, Altean alchemist Honerva, had been poisoned by the close studies of Quintessence while studying the space rift which the comet came through. Zarkon then tricks the original Paladins into taking him and his wife into White Space (a reality of pure Quintessence) to restore his beloved wife, but it ended up killing them both. To close the portal for the protection of everyone, Alfor and the other paladins destroyed the Galran homeworld, Daibazaal. Afterwards, both Zarkon and Honerva were resurrected by Dark Quintessence from the other universe into the Emperor Zarkon and Witch Haggar they are today, but Haggar had also lost her memory. The Galra immediately responded to their leader and attacked many planets. King Alfor was killed by the corrupted Zarkon after scattering the Lions across the universe, and Zarkon destroyed Altea. Afterwards, the team pieces together Lotor's plan based on recent events: to gather the purest Quintessence possible from different universes. Haggar remembers what her husband did to revive her and restores Zarkon to consciousness.

=== Season 4 (2017) ===
No. overall	No. in season	Title	Directed by	Written by
34	1	"Code of Honor"	Eugene Lee	Tim Hedrick
Keith continues his training with the Blade of Marmora by accompanying them on intelligence missions, in the process neglecting his duties as the leader of Voltron. When Kolivan reveals that the Galra most likely have a secret supply chain of a new form of Quintessence, Keith joins the mission to infiltrate one of the Galra supply vessels. The Blade discovers that the vessel is a trap once they are aboard, and the Marmoran Regris is killed in a subsequent explosion. Despite this and Allura's plea for Keith to continue to lead Voltron, Keith continues to spend most of his time with the Blade of Marmora. Some time later, the Paladins receive a distress signal from a rebel convoy under attack by the Galra. The four Paladins struggle to hold off the Galra while Keith is absent. Shiro pleads the Black Lion to let him pilot it, successfully reestablishing their bond. Shiro reconvenes with the other four lions and together they form Voltron, which easily destroys the Galra fleet. After the battle, Keith confronts the team and officially steps down as the leader of Voltron, handing the position to Shiro so that he can continue to work with the Blade of Marmora.
35	2	"Reunion"	Steve In-Chang Ahn	Mitch Iverson
Pidge has a flashback of Matt coming to comfort her after a rough day at school. On Olkarion, Pidge leaves the team to pursue a lead on Matt. She meets with an arms dealer to negotiate the information, but has to force it from him when he tries to capture her for the bounty he'd get. A hooded figure asks where the "boy" went, and the arms dealer reluctantly admits he thinks it was a Paladin of Voltron who attacked him. Pidge follows the information from the arms dealer to a rebel base, aiding in fighting off a Galra attack. She finds her lead, Te'Osh, is mortally wounded. Te'Osh gives her Matt's transponder code, which leads her to a space graveyard for rebel fighters. Devastated, Pidge finds a grave marker with Matt's name on it, but the date of birth is wrong. She figures out it's a quantum frequency that conceals a set of coordinates, leading her to a spy lair on a seemingly remote asteroid. A masked figure attacks her and Pidge fights him briefly, only to realize it is Matt. Their reunion is cut short when the bounty hunter from earlier interrupts. The siblings team up to take the bounty hunter out.
36	3	"Black Site"	Steve In-Chang Ahn	Tim Hedrick
Emperor Zarkon has fully revived and reclaims the Galra throne. Zarkon relieves Prince Lotor of duty while Haggar, still suspicious of Lotor, keeps an eye on him. Meanwhile, Matt meets the Paladins and Coran and finishes Pidge's Galra tracking system with intelligence he collected while working with the rebels. While spying on Lotor, Haggar learns that he has obtained the trans-reality comet and has made two ships from its ore, and is planning to make another. She informs Zarkon, who orders her to hunt down Lotor. However, Lotor kills Narti, one of his generals, after realizing Haggar is spying on him through her. Matt, Pidge, and Hunk discover a way to decrypt Galra communications and discover that the Galra are attacking a seemingly empty area of space. The Paladins set out to defend whoever the Galra are attacking, accompanied by Matt, who operates Voltron's cloaking capabilities in Pidge's lion. When they arrive at the point of interest, they learn that Zarkon is attacking Lotor, and are forced to defend against the Galra fleet once Voltron's cloaking technology fails. Lotor and the Paladins manage to escape the scene as Zarkon broadcasts to the Galra Empire that Lotor and his henchmen are to be killed on sight by any means possible.
37	4	"The Voltron Show!"	Chris Palmer	Joshua Hamilton
Shiro tasks Coran with organizing promotional Voltron appearances to bolster public support for Voltron and the rebel cause. After organizing a terrible show to hospital patients, Coran quietly buys an illegal mental enhancement pill from one of the patients. The team expresses doubts in Coran's ability to manage Voltron appearances after he botches a visit to a planet whose occupants can safely go outside for only one day per year. That night, Coran places the pill he bought under his pillow, which hatches a worm that latches onto his brain while he sleeps. A more energized Coran organizes many successful shows, to the increasing chagrin of the Paladins. To enhance the spectacle during their last show, Coran summons a monster from the planet they visited earlier to battle the Paladins. After an alien removes the worm from Coran's brain, Coran warns the Paladins of the monster's danger. To the thrill of the audience, they ward it off. Coran later apologizes to the Paladins, but Shiro admits that Coran's shows were very effective.
38	5	"Begin the Blitz"	Eugene Lee	Rocco Pucillo
With the coalition against Zarkon sufficiently large, the Blade of Marmora and Shiro construct a plan to reclaim one third of the Galra Empire by taking down the Galra-occupied planet Naxzela. Prince Lotor leads his generals to the remains of Daizabaal, where he has secretly erected a gate around the inter-reality rift where his mother had worked. Lotor uses the last of his Quintessence to enter the field between the realities to collect the infinite supply of Quintessence therein. The coalition begins its plan to reclaim part of the empire. Pidge and Hunk disable a communication satellite while the Blade of Marmora and a team led by Matt hijack large cannons that they use against the Galra. Once Acxa, Ezor, and Zethrid realize that Lotor's gate does not work, Acxa stuns him with the intent to return him to Zarkon in exchange for a pardon. However, Lotor manages to escape his handcuffs once he wakes, and flies away in his cruiser. The satellite that Pidge and Hunk have disabled begins to work again, and Haggar learns of the Empire's defeat.
39	6	"A New Defender"	Steve In-Chang Ahn	Tim Hedrick
The coalition's success is abruptly interrupted when an incoming Galra cruiser remotely disables the Galra technology they were using. Lotor is spotted by the Empire in deep space and is pursued by Zarkon's fleet, only narrowly escaping. Haggar, focused on stopping the coalition's tirade, begins a ritual that traps Voltron on Naxzela's surface by multiplying the intensity of the planet's gravity. Unable to move Voltron, the Paladins flee to the planet's core to find and disable the source of energy causing the gravity change. There, Allura attempts to disarm the planet's energized core, to no success. Hunk observes that the planet's soil is highly volatile, leading the Paladins to realize that the planet is being used as a bomb that will detonate when a Galra cannon fires at it. Unable to communicate, Keith and Matt confront the oncoming Galra cruiser. While listening to Galra communications, Lotor learns about the impending explosion and heads towards it. As the Paladins try to escape Naxzela, Lance encourages Allura to use her Altean abilities to overcome the planet's gravity, which she manages to do. After Voltron, the Blade, and Matt's team regroup, they realize that they cannot disarm the cannon on the Galra cruiser without taking down its force field. After their attempts to shoot at it fail, Keith nearly sacrifices himself to ram into the shield before a powerful blast from Lotor's cruiser destroys it. Lotor asks the coalition to "have a discussion" despite their differences in the past.

=== Season 5 (2018) ===
No. overall	No. in season	Title	Directed by	Written by
40	1	"The Prisoner"	Chris Palmer	Eugene Son
The Paladins, following a lead from Lotor, successfully infiltrate and destroy a sentry construction facility. Still unsure of his allegiance, they're reluctant to let him out of captivity, so Lotor offers a more personal bargaining chip; the last-known whereabouts of Commander Sam Holt, Pidge and Matt's father. Matt and Pidge rush in to the prison their father was held in, accompanied by Rolo, Nyma, and Beezer, but Pidge is forced to drop the others off while she draws away the Galra fleet. While Rolo and Nyma set about freeing the prisoners, Matt looks for his father, only to find he has already been moved. They return to the Castle of Lions, where they receive an incoming transmission from Zarkon. He demands an exchange of prisoners: Commander Holt for Lotor.
41	2	"Blood Duel"	Eugene Lee	Joshua Hamilton
Upon receiving the transmission, Pidge immediately agrees to the trade and becomes enraged when the others are reluctant to agree. Lotor counters with a warning that Zarkon will likely double-cross them. Nevertheless, the Paladins agree to the exchange, and Pidge, Matt, and Shiro head to the rendezvous point in a shuttle while the others wait out of range in the Castle. Elsewhere, Haggar retrieves a fraction of her lost memories, realizing that Lotor is in fact her son. The prisoner exchange seems to go well, until Pidge runs out to greet her father and realizes it is a hologram. Zarkon then demands Voltron in exchange for Commander Holt. Immediately, Lotor attacks Zarkon, and Pidge, Matt, and Shiro pursue Lotor's former generals as they make off with Commander Holt. The other Paladins and Coran move in to assist, and Commander Holt is rescued and reunited with his children. Meanwhile, Lotor struggles to gain the upper hand in his duel with Zarkon, but ultimately defeats and kills Zarkon once and for all.
42	3	"Postmortem"	Steve In-Chang Ahn	Todd Ludy
Following Zarkon's demise, the Empire is left in turmoil. Haggar recruits Lotor's former generals in her plan to keep Lotor off the throne (and presumably out of danger). Lotor informs the team that the Galra will be preparing for a coronation ceremony called the Kral Zera in the next two days, in which a new emperor or empress will be crowned. He stresses the importance of his presence there, and Shiro agrees, but everyone else is wary and believe it is too dangerous to plan a mission of that magnitude in such a short time. Shiro snaps at Lance and puts his foot down, accepting no questions on the matter. Later, Lance discovers a third form of his bayard, an ancient Altean broadsword which Allura tells him her father once wielded. She confesses her concerns about Shiro to Lance, who assures her that they both have the Coalition's best interests at heart. A Galra commander attacks the new Coalition capitol on Olkarion with a virus that infects the forest in an attempt to seize power. With Voltron on the verge of being captured, the Paladins use all five bayards simultaneously, allowing them to access the astral plane. Shiro only half materializes, calling out to Lance, who cannot hear him. When they successfully overcome the virus and return to the physical plane, Lance approaches Shiro about what he was trying to tell him. Shiro says he doesn't remember calling out to him, leaving Lance unsettled. Commander Holt tells his children that he's proud of them, but that he must return to Earth to prepare their planet for the coming war.
43	4	"Kral Zera"	Chris Palmer	Mitch Iverson
Keith and two other Blade of Marmora members infiltrate Planet Feyiv, where the Kral Zera will be held, with the aid of a Galra mole. Lotor explains the Kral Zera in greater detail, but the Paladins still disagree with his plan. Shiro storms off the bridge, and Hunk comments on how weird he's being. Keith and the two Blade members plant bombs in the underbelly of the ceremonial platform, above which a skirmish breaks out among the generals present. Haggar arrives with her generals and the commander she has chosen to delegate for the throne; Sendak. When it seems like Sendak will acend the stairs and light the Kral Zera, Lotor appears in the Black Lion with Shiro, who has gone behind the backs of the other Paladins and moved forward with Lotor's plan. Keith realizes Shiro's presence and scrambles to disarm the bombs, leaving the other Blade members to desert him. He is unable to disarm all of the bombs in time, and the consequent explosions interrupt Lotor's duel with Sendak, sending the ceremony into chaos. The other Paladins arrive in time to aid Shiro, and Acxa saves Keith from a rogue Galra commander. Lotor lights the Kral Zera and is officially crowned as the new emperor of the Galra Empire.
44	5	"Bloodlines"	Eugene Lee	Mark Bemesderfer
The team bids farewell to Commander Holt, and Kolivan sends Keith on a mission to destroy a super weapon that was being developed by a Galra commander named Ranveig and retrieve one of their operatives. Kolivan stresses the importance of destroying this weapon before it falls into the hands of either of the two warring factions, and warns Keith not to let his emotions cloud his judgement. Meanwhile, the newly crowned Emperor Lotor allows the team access to Galra headquarters, where he insists on asking Allura's help in looking over Haggar's research materials. Lance, Pidge, and Hunk reprogram their escort sentry and get up to several shenanigans which ends with their pursuit by other guards. Keith successfully meets up with the operative, Krolia, but their mission to destroy the weapon is interrupted by Commander Trugg, one of the faction leaders. Trugg captures Keith and demands their surrender, and to Keith's surprise, Krolia obliges in giving up the code to the weapon in exchange for Keith's release and their safe passage. Trugg immediately fires upon them once she has the codes, but Krolia assures Keith that Trugg is at the mercy of the weapon, not the other way around. The weapon turns out to be a ferocious biological monster. Once they're in the clear, Keith asks how Krolia was able to use his Marmora blade. She confesses that it used to be hers before she left it in the care of Keith's father, revealing her identity as Keith's mother.
45	6	"White Lion"	Steve In-Chang Ahn	Tim Hedrick
Upon discovering a stone that contains a map to the mythical land of Oriande, the birthplace of Altean alchemy, Lotor convinces Allura and the team that they must travel to the Patrulian System, a deadly area long since deemed unsafe for navigation. While Coran expresses his concerns, Allura feels in her gut that this is the right thing to do, so the team agrees. They discover a white hole, a massive field of energy output that only Voltron can safely traverse. The Paladins attempt, but are stopped by a White Lion guarding the way through. The Castle of Lions and all of the Lions lose power and the Paladins are forced to manually evacuate. Lotor explains why his and Allura's Altean markings are glowing; they're Marks of the Chosen, designating them as the only ones worthy of crossing into Oriande. While the two of them navigate this uncharted land, the others struggle to try and get the Castle back up and running before they run out of air. Shiro pulls a distraught Lance out into the hallway and surprises Lance when he confesses that he doesn't recall anything from their stint in the astral plane and that he doesn't feel like himself. Meanwhile, Allura and Lotor both face off against the White Lion guardian, and where Lotor fights and is ultimately kicked out of the temple, Allura unlocks the secret to Altean alchemy already hidden inside her. They return to the Castle just as the others are about to pass out from lack of oxygen. Haggar spies on the team through Shiro and orders her generals to set a course for the Patrulian System.

=== Season 6 (2018) ===
No. overall	No. in season	Title	Directed by	Written by
46	1	"Omega Shield"	Chris Palmer	Mitch Iverson
Lotor discusses Voltron and the Empire's next move--Lotor insists that the Sincline ships are the utmost priority, while Lance tries to convince Allura that liberating planets should be the most important thing. Several factions of Galra are splitting off from the Empire, the most notable of which being The Fire of Purification, led by Sendak. Sendak launches an attack on a loyalist shield station, and Hunk, newly educated in Galra culture, leads the charge in the station's repair before the next radiation band annihilates the innocent people on the planet the station protects. Shiro suffers an attack during the repairs, causing the station's power to fail. Lance is almost killed protecting Allura from a catastrophic discharge, though she arrives in time to heal him and pull him back from the brink. They repair the station in the nick of time. Meanwhile, Honerva arrives at the gates of Oriande.
47	2	"Razor's Edge"	Eugene Lee	Joshua Hamilton
Stunned by the revelation about his mother, Keith demands answers, but Krolia reminds him that they have a mission to complete. En route, they are assaulted by mysterious creatures and are forced to ditch their ship or be torn apart by the space-time dropoffs. Forced to continue on foot, the two are caught in a blast of light that causes Keith to have visions of the past and future. Krolia explains that it was an example of time collapsing near the dark stars. Period flashes give Keith detail of how his parents met, how they discovered the Blue Lion, and ultimately why Krolia chose to leave. Similarly, Krolia discovers the fate of her lover and Keith's father. Hitching a ride on the back of a whale-like creature, Keith, Krolia and a cosmic wolf they adopted spend two years (several weeks for everyone else) within the warped time of the quantum abyss before they emerge on the other side to discover a well-kept facility, inside which they find an Altean. Meanwhile, Lance struggles to come to terms with his feelings for Allura and his jealousy of how much time she spends with Lotor.
48	3	"Monsters & Mana"	Steve In-Chang Ahn	Mitch Iverson
A dwarf and a cleric are pursued by a vicious creature. Taking the crystal it dropped, the two venture to an inn to ask the innkeeper for more details about it, wherein they meet a paladin with a tragic backstory who offers to aid them in their quest. Upon leaving the inn, however, the paladin is devoured by a large rat. It turns out that Coran, Shiro, Hunk, and Pidge are all playing Monsters and Mana, and the large rat was just Platt chewing on Shiro's character token. Shiro insists on continuing as a paladin, much to the others' chagrin. Lance and Allura come to join them (the former reluctantly so), and they venture into the Tomb of Horrors. Together, they use their unique abilities to overcome the obstacles Lore Master Coran throws at them. Afterwards, Pidge and Hunk hurry off to continue repairs on the Castle, while Allura is called off by Lotor. Lance reluctantly joins Shiro and Coran for another round.
49	4	"The Colony"	Chris Palmer	Mark Bemesderfer
With the work on the Sincline ships done, Allura and Lotor make the journey into the quintessence field while the others wait nervously in the Castle of Lions. They're hailed by an unidentified craft, piloted by Keith, which Coran is shocked to learn is Altean in origin. Keith arrives with Krolia, the Altean they discovered, and the cosmic wolf he rescued on the space whale to tell them that Lotor has been lying to them all this time. Romelle, the Altean, explains that Lotor rescued any Alteans who hadn't been on Altea at the time of its destruction and created a colony for them to hide and live in peace. While many revered Lotor as a messiah, Romelle was skeptical, especially when many of her people and her own brother were taken to supposedly start a second colony. It is revealed that the second colony was a farce and that Lotor has been harvesting quintessence from thousands of Alteans. Betrayed when she learns this, Allura knocks Lotor out despite his pleas for her to listen to him. Honerva then unleashes her trump card on them all--Shiro. Under her control, Shiro makes off with the unconscious Lotor, Pidge unable to bring herself to apprehend him. Keith then reclaims command of the Black Lion and Voltron takes off in pursuit of Shiro and Lotor.
50	5	"The Black Paladins"	Eugene Lee	Joaquim Dos Santos
With Keith back in the Black Lion, the Paladins engage the Sincline ships piloted by Lotor's generals while Shiro escapes with an unconscious Lotor. Despite their efforts, they all escape via a wormhole conjured by Honerva, though Keith is able to make it through at the last moment. On the other side, Shiro hands Lotor over to the generals before being commanded by Honerva to lure Keith away. Honerva greets Lotor, revealing herself as his mother, but Lotor renounces her and refuses to accept or acknowledge her as his mother. Acxa, having been working with Lotor the entire time so that the Paladins would trust him, fires on Honerva, but she escapes. Zethrid and Ezor agree to work for Lotor again before all four leave in the Sincline ships back to the Castle. Everyone back at the Castle struggles against a virus, planted by Shiro, that shuts down the entire Castle and leaves them powerless. Meanwhile, Shiro leads Keith to a secret facility where Keith discovers various clones of Shiro before engaging him in battle. Keith is scarred in the fight, but is able to cut off Shiro's mechanical arm, which was causing Haggar to control the latter. As the facility crumbles around them, Keith tries to save Shiro, but the rest of the facility collapses and they begin falling while Keith remembers how they met and how Shiro promised to never give up on him.
51	6	"All Good Things"	Steve In-Chang Ahn	Joshua Hamilton
Keith awakens in the astral plane, where he is greeted by the real Shiro. Shiro explains that after their battle with Zarkon when he disappeared, he actually died and his physical body was destroyed, but the Black Lion absorbed his spirit to save him. Back at the Castle, Coran works with the others on trying to restore the Castle. Lance comforts Allura over her hurt feelings and guilt of allowing Lotor to manipulate her. Keith, in the Black Lion, contacts them and explains that Shiro was a clone and that Lotor's Sincline ships are headed towards them. Realizing that he needs to get back into the Quintessence field, Allura decides that they must destroy the inter-reality gate. Lotor and his generals arrive shortly after and Lotor pleads his case with Allura, but she refuses to listen after everything he's done to the Alteans. When she says that he is just like Zarkon, Lotor snaps and orders his generals to destroy the Lions. Lotor's true colors begin to shine as he declares he will start a new Altea, one that never knows of King Alfor, Princess Allura or Voltron and where he is worshipped as their savior. When he declares he will wipe out all his enemies, including the rest of the Galra, Acxa, Ezor and Zethrid decide to leave Lotor for good and abandon the battle. However, Lotor ejects them from their ships and combines the Sincline ships into a Voltron-like mech that he can pilot by himself. Lotor's mech easily overpowers the Lions and severely damages the Castleship. Keith pleads with Shiro's spirit inside the Black Lion to help him reach the others. Shiro tells him to see the others through the Lion's eyes and Keith is able to activate the Black Lion's ephemeral wings, allowing him to arrive just in time before Lotor finishes the Lions. Now together, they form Voltron and prepare to face Lotor's mech.
52	7	"Defender of All Universes"	Rie Koga; Chris Palmer	Tim Hedrick
Keith shuttles the clone Shiro to the Castle as the Paladins prepare to engage Lotor. It is a difficult battle, due to Lotor's mech's superior speed and evasion, but the Paladins are able to force him into a corner and gain the upper hand. Just before finishing him, Lotor's mech suddenly jumps into the quintessence field at will, making him even harder to attack while also replenishing his energy with quintessence. Realizing that the only way to defeat him is within the field, Allura opens a path into the field where Lotor waits for them. The quintessence keeps the Paladins recharged and empowers Voltron enough to match Lotor's mech, but they are still at a standstill. Allura realizes that the quintessence is negatively affecting them the same way it corrupted Zarkon and Honerva and that they must leave soon, with Lotor already going mad with power just like his parents. Allura uses her powers to empty all of Voltron's quintessence into Lotor's mech, overloading it. The Paladins escape the field before they can retrieve Lotor, leaving him to die and his damaged mech stranded in the field. When they return, Coran reveals that Lotor's constant jumping in and out of the field has caused various rifts in reality to form and that they will continue to expand until the entire universe is destroyed. Coran deduces that he could overload the teludav to seal all the rifts, but sacrificing the Castle in the process. With no other choice, the Paladins unload and evacuate the Castle. As the Castle enters the rift, the teludav overloads and the Castle is destroyed, but the rifts are successfully closed, leaving behind a single diamond as a result of the Castle being crushed by the sheer pressure of the rifts. After landing on a small planetoid, the Paladins try to help Shiro, whose spirit is within the Black Lion. Lance tearfully realizes that the real Shiro had tried to reach out to him, but he didn't understand. Allura uses her powers to extract Shiro's spirit from within the Black Lion and transfer it into the clone body, turning the rest of Shiro's hair white. As the Paladins decide what to do next, Pidge reveals that a copy of the plans for the Castleship were given to her father before he left to return to Earth. Keith declares that they are going home.

=== Season 7 (2018) ===
No. overall	No. in season	Title	Directed by	Written by
53	1	"A Little Adventure"	Eugene Lee	May Chan; Mitch Iverson
Following on from the sacrifice of the Castle of Lions, the Paladins and their allies need to figure out a way to recharge the Lions after their battle with Lotor. Shiro remains comatose after having his spirit from the Black Lion placed in the clone body. Coran leads a group including Hunk, Pidge, Lance, and Romelle in search of Yalmors to try and re-energize the Lions while Keith, Krolia, and Allura remain behind with Shiro. As Shiro sleeps, he remembers parts of his past, including his first meeting with Keith, sponsoring him to the Galaxy Garrison and becoming friends with him, his relationship with Adam, and his choice to go on the Kerberos mission despite being ill. The situation becomes worse when it becomes apparent that the clone body is rejecting Shiro's spirit and Allura is unable to do anything. As Coran and the others find a Yalmor, they are sprayed by a creature and shrunk but they are able to return to normal size using the same energy they were searching for to repower the Lions. Shiro manages to pull through before the rest of the team returns.
54	2	"The Road Home"	Michael Chang	Joshua Hamilton
Although the Lions are not at full strength, the Paladins are resolved to head to Earth, a trip that will take one and a half Earth years. Pidge tries to contact the Voltron Coalition but has no luck. After having trouble sorting out who rides in which Lion, they eventually arrive at a Blade of Marmora outpost only to find it long abandoned. As they try to investigate, the Paladins are attacked by a small Galra fleet. However, with their underpowered Lions, the Paladins are outmatched by the Galra. The Paladins fly into a cyclone and use an ice planet to their advantage in dealing with some of the Galra, but are eventually captured by Lotor's former generals, Ezor and Zethrid.
55	3	"The Way Forward"	Rie Koga	Mark Bemesderfer
The lions have been subdued by Ezor and Zethrid, who have become pirate warlords and the Paladins, Krolia, Romelle, and Shiro have been locked in the brig. Coran, having evaded capture, is assisted by the mice in subduing a Galra pirate and taking his uniform. Coran's ruse does not last long however, but Acxa appears and saves him. Together, they devise a plan to rescue the others and escape the pirate fleet. Ezor and Zethrid interrogate the Paladins on the result of their battle with Lotor and his subsequent fate, worried that if Lotor is alive that he will come after them for abandoning him. They leave when Acxa triggers an alarm and fires an ion cannon in the hangar, ejecting the Lions into space and forcing the ship into lockdown before confronting Ezor and Zethrid. The group is able to escape and retrieve their helmets and bayards thanks to the mice and learn through them that Acxa is helping their escape. Unwilling to leave her behind, Keith rescues Acxa from Ezor and Zethrid and they escape. Keith then detonates a group of explosives in the ship, badly injuring Ezor and Zethrid. Afterward, Acxa fills the team in on what has happened and they are shocked to discover that three years have passed since they fought Lotor. Acxa had chosen to find her own path and dedicates herself to helping the Voltron Coalition in any way she can, while the others ponder over what else has changed.
56	4	"The Feud!"	Eugene Lee	Tim Hedrick
The Paladins inexplicably find themselves on a game show called "Garfle Warfle Snick" hosted by an alien named Bob. He challenges them to solve his various puzzles recapping their adventures while pitting them against comedic versions of their enemies. If they lose, they will have to stay in the game show for the rest of eternity. For the final challenge, Bob has each of the Paladins vote for one person who they think should escape from the show. When all of the Paladins vote for a different teammate (Keith and Lance voted for each other, Hunk voted for Allura, Allura voted for Pidge, and Pidge voted for Hunk) (Quotes on why they voted for each other, *Keith: "I just don't want to spend the rest of eternity with Lance." Lance: "Keith is our leader and also he's half Gallra, so I think he's the future." Pidge: "Hunk is the kindest guy I know, so if the is anyone who must get out and bring the nations together, I think it's him." Allura: "Pidge and her family got the best chance of finishing what my father started." Hunk: "Allura is like our leader and she's a princess, so I think she deserve to go."), he deems them all winners and the show ends. All the Paladins wake up on their Lions shortly after and realize they had the same dream. Coran tells them he's heard legends of Bob, who is apparently an all-powerful, all-knowing interdimensional being who judges the worthiness of great warriors.
57	5	"The Ruins"	Michael Chang	Mitch Iverson
Pidge picks up a distress signal sent from what appears to be a senior member of the Blade of Marmora. The team heads to a planet and find a devastated set of ruins. They find a single alien, Macidus, who has several Marmora blades in his presence. Macidus fills the team in on events since their disappearance: with Lotor gone, the Galra Empire fractured, and Haggar's Druids set out on a mission to eliminate the Blade of Marmora. They drew the Blades to the planet and fought a vicious battle, with Macidus being the only survivor. While the majority of Macidus's story is true, Macidus is revealed to actually be one of Haggar's Druids, and the one who fought Keith years previously and has been using the signal to draw the scattered remnants of the Blades to the planet to kill them. Macidus uses his powers to freeze the team, but Keith's cosmic wolf, nicknamed Kosmo, teleports Keith away in time. They fight throughout the caverns, and find Kolivan alive. Meanwhile, Allura manages to free the other Paladins to join the fight and Keith kills Macidus. Kolivan is freed, and Krolia decides to join him in rebuilding the Blades as the Paladins continue on to Earth.
58	6	"The Journey Within"	Eugene Lee	Tim Hedrick
With the Lions not at their full power, Shiro suggests that the Paladins need to become a fully realized team to charge their Lions without the Castle's help. Before they can figure out a way to improve their teamwork, a storm appears that incapacitates the Lions and freezes everyone but the Paladins with a strong energy pulse. When they try to tether the Lions together, the storm appears again and separates the Paladins from the Lions, leaving them stranded in space. As the days continue, the Paladins start to lose their sanity and trustworthiness for each other. Hunk desperately tries to keep them together and stops them from falling for an illusion of Earth generated by a large manta ray-like creature. Hunk's bravery inspires the team to work together and the regained trust guides the Lions back to them. They are able to form Voltron once more and escape from the creature. They enter the storm again where the other passengers are restored back to normal, and they discovered that the storm has advanced their trip, putting them back in the Milky Way Galaxy.
59	7	"The Last Stand, Part 1"	Rie Koga	Joshua Hamilton
As Voltron nears Earth, Pidge tries to contact her father and receives a recorded message from him telling them that the Galra Empire have invaded Earth, and they are preparing for their last stand. Four years earlier, Samuel Holt wakes in the Galaxy Garrison after being quarantined and is reunited with his wife, Colleen. Sam recounts his experiences with the Galra to the Galaxy Garrison's command staff, and warns them about a probable attack by the Galra on Earth. Sam advises them to warn the planet immediately but Admiral Sanda refuses to panic the world with the revelation of an alien attack. Commander Iverson and Sam begin analyzing Galra and Altean technology in an attempt to engineer new defenses for Earth. Sam meets the Garrison's top cadets – James Griffin, Rizavi, Kinkade, and Leifsdottir and they begin upgrading Earth's defense capabilities. A year later, Sam receives word from Matt that Voltron has disappeared, and that the Voltron Coalition is being targeted and wiped out by the remnants of the Galra. Admiral Sanda orders Sam to break all communication with the outside galaxy in order to hide Earth's location. Sam argues that they should tell the world about the Galra, but Sanda again refuses. Without authorization, Sam and Colleen broadcast the truth to the world. Sanda orders them arrested, but support comes in from around the planet. Some time later, Sam is testing a new particle barrier at the Galaxy Garrison when the Galra arrive and begin attacking Earth.
60	8	"The Last Stand, Part 2"	Michael Chang	Mitch Iverson
Sendak leads the Galra invasion of Earth. Admiral Sanda refuses to deploy the new MFE fighters, and sends out a standard response led by Adam, but the fighters are all killed. Sendak demands Voltron be surrendered to him, but the Garrison has no idea where they are. The Galra continue to invade, and soon most of Earth is overrun. Only the Galaxy Garrison with its particle barrier is able hold out, so Sanda finally allows the deployment of the MFE fighters. Combined with new base weapons, the Garrison manages to force Sendak's forces to retreat from their position. Realizing that they cannot hold their position without sufficient supplies, Veronica, Lance's sister, takes Griffin and his squad on a supply run to a depot. During the mission, she seemingly sacrifices herself to allow them to escape. Sendak destroys the communications grid and continues to subjugate the planet. Cut off, the Garrison continues work on the IGF-Atlas. Veronica returns to the Garrison, having made contact with a resistance network, who reveals that the captured population are being put to work creating weapons for the Galra. Low on supplies and morale, Sam gives a speech urging them all to keep fighting.
61	9	"Know Your Enemy"	Rie Koga	Joshua Hamilton
The Paladins race through the solar system en route to Earth, and finally contact Sam. Sam tells them to not bring the Lions to Earth because if Sendak knows they are there, he will threaten the population unless they turn them over. So, the Paladins leave the Lions near Saturn and steal a Galra patrol ship to covertly land on Earth. On the surface, they are attacked by a Galra force and are rescued by James Griffin and his squad who escort them back to the Galaxy Garrison. Lance and Pidge reunite with their families, but Hunk's family are among civilians captured. The Paladins are brought up to speed on the Galra's efforts on Earth. Admiral Sanda wants to trade Voltron for the Earth, but the Paladins refuse. Using the information from the Castle of Lions, they build an AI version of Sendak using his memories and interrogate it to learn Sendak's tactics and eventual plans. This proves difficult for Allura, reliving the trauma of her homeworld's destruction, so she turns her attention to something else: creating a new arm for Shiro out of the Garrison's prototypes. Keith and Hunk head out to rescue Hunk's family, linking up with a resistance member. He shows them the work camp where Hunk's family is held but tells them there is currently no chance to rescue them. Hunk is able to see his family from afar and vows to rescue them.
62	10	"Heart of the Lion"	Eugene Lee	Rocco Pucillo
While being fitted with his new arm, Shiro reacts negatively to it but is able to stabilize after Allura replaces the power source with the crystal from her circlet. Using knowledge from the AI, the Paladins present Sendak's strategy to the Galaxy Garrison command staff: using slave labor, he is constructing weapons at key locations around the planet that will help him to control the planet. In order to determine their strategy, a team of Paladins and Galaxy Garrison pilots are sent on a scouting mission. A ground team of Keith, Pidge, Allura, James Griffin, and Kosmo infiltrates the facility while a sniper team consisting of Lance, Hunk, Kinkade, and Veronica covers them. Pidge manages to get the information and learns that the facilities are building Zaiforge Cannons capable of destroying the planet. With the stakes high, the decision is made to attack all six bases at the same time: five lions to attack a facility each, and for the MFE fighters to assault the sixth. Four of the Paladins are delivered to their targets by an MFE fighter, with Lance being driven to his target by his sister, Veronica. All of the Paladins manage to call their Lions, but the target defenses are stronger than expected and the Paladins are unable to prevent the launch of the Zaiforge Cannons. It becomes clear that their plan has been leaked – Admiral Sanda has reached an agreement with Sendak to hand over Voltron in exchange for Earth. The Paladins converge in Earth's atmosphere and form Voltron, but Sendak fires the Zaiforge Cannons at them, dispersing Voltron, knocking out the Paladins, and leaving the Lions out of power.
63	11	"Trial By Fire"	Michael Chang	Joshua Hamilton
The Paladins are captured and incarcerated aboard Sendak's ship while Sendak continues his assault on Earth, despite Admiral Sanda's pleas that they had a deal. Sanda is sent to the cells with the Paladins. At the Galaxy Garrison, Shiro suggests taking the offensive. If they transfer all power, including that powering the particle shield, to the IGF-Atlas, they might be able to get it powered and flying. The MFE fighters provide cover while Shiro, Coran and Sam try to get the Atlas airborne. After a failed attempt, Coran realizes the crystal formed from the destruction of the Castle of Lions could be the key and inserts it in the ship. It instantly powers the ship and the Atlas launches and joins the fight. Aboard Sendak's ship, the Paladins use their connections with the Lions to telepathically control them. When Sendak realizes what they are doing, he sends his Lieutenant, Hepta, to kill the Paladins. Admiral Sanda manages to get free and almost stops Hepta, but is mortally wounded in the process. The Paladins use the Lions to free themselves and join the battle, and the Black Lion kills Hepta. Sanda begs the Paladins to save Earth when she could not and dies.
64	12	"Lions' Pride, Part 1"	Rie Koga	Mitch Iverson
Voltron begins to turn the tide of the battle in Earth's favor, but Sam soon realizes Sendak's plan. Using the Zaiforge Cannons, Sendak intends to combine their beams to destroy the Earth. Voltron tries to destroy Sendak's command ship, but soon find that the cannons' launch facilities were also designed to defend the cannons from the surface. Pidge proposes a plan to use the orbital reflectors that the Galra use to deflect the beams of the Zaiforge Cannons in an effort to deflect the beam away from Earth. While they move the reflectors into position, the MFE fighters launch on a mission to take out the launch facilities one by one so as to remove the Galra's ground support. The Paladins successfully deflect the beams from the Zaiforge Cannons, but the constant fire eventually causes them to buckle and break. The IGF-Atlas intercepts the beam, while Shiro infiltrates Sendak's ship and disrupts the control crystal. Shiro's efforts give the Paladins enough time to destroy the Zaiforge Cannons while the MFEs finish destroying the launch bases. Sendak's ship plummets towards the Earth. The Lions guide the ship into an uninhabited area while Shiro and Sendak fight. Sendak gets the upper hand and looks to kill Shiro, but Keith arrives and kills Sendak. The Paladins' victory is short-lived, however, as a meteor falls to Earth.
65	13	"Lions' Pride, Part 2"	Eugene Lee	Joshua Hamilton
Just after Sendak and his forces are defeated, a powerful enemy robot arrives from space to fight the Paladins. Despite the Paladins' best efforts and the support from the Atlas, the robot takes down Voltron and drains its energy, in a manner similar to that of Haggar's Komar device. Just as the robot is about to destroy the Paladins, Shiro learns to use the power of the crystal to convert the Atlas itself into a massive robot that dwarfs Voltron. The enemy robot then fights the Atlas and incapacitates it, but the Paladins take the time to recompose and devise a plan to fight back. Realizing that the enemy robot's weak point is in the chest, the Paladins succeed in defeating it, but then the robot prepares itself to self-destruct, and the Paladins use their Lions to lift the robot to space, where it explodes from a safe distance. After the battle, the Paladins recover at the hospital surrounded by their families and friends, and eventually, all the remaining members of the Voltron Coalition (including Shay, Matt, Nyma, Krolia, etc.) arrive at Earth, not only to help rebuild it, but also to make it their main base of operations against the Galra Empire. Months later, after the Garrison had retrieved most of the remains of the robot, Allura is shocked upon learning that a female Altean was discovered inside it as the power source.

=== Season 8 (2018) ===
No. overall	No. in season	Title	Directed by	Written by
66	1	"Launch Date"	Michael Chang	Lauren Montgomery
Six months have passed since the defeat of Sendak and the mysterious Robeast. With the Atlas and Voltron preparing to leave Earth to liberate the rest of the universe from the Galra, Hunk pushes Lance to ask Allura out on a date, which he manages to do. Pidge, Romelle, Rizavi and Leifsdottir help her choose a dress for the date while Lance is ordered by Coran to follow Altean customs. Prior to the date, Keith gives Lance a pep talk, reminding him that Allura agreed because she liked him. Allura joins Lance's family for dinner and they later kiss. Meanwhile, the comatose Altean, Luca, wakes up. She accuses Romelle of being a traitor and mentions that Honerva sent the Robeast before Honerva telepathically kills her. The next day, Voltron and the Atlas leave Earth.
67	2	"Shadows"	Rie Koga	Mitch Iverson
In the past, Honerva reveals to Zarkon that she is pregnant with their child, whom they name Lotor after Lotarious, a figure in Altean history, and Kaltor, a figure in Galra mythology. After the destruction of Daibazzal, Honerva has lost all her memories and assumes the name "Haggar", taken from a Galra medic sent to attend to her that she instead kills. She later gives birth to Lotor, but does not acknowledge anything until Zarkon questions her about Quintessence. From there, Lotor grows, excelling at his academic and strategic studies despite his smaller physical stature for a typical Galra. He inquires about his mother, but Zarkon refuses to speak anymore of her. When Lotor is slightly older, he takes possession of Honerva's old cat, Kova. Many years later, Lotor receives his father and Haggar at a planet under his dominion, but Zarkon is disgusted that Lotor chooses to work alongside the local populace rather than subjugate them and has the planet destroyed and Lotor banished. In the present, Honerva desperately tries seeking Lotor and eventually discovers his battle with Voltron in the Quintessence field. At the next Kral Zera, Honerva reveals herself and kills all those in attendance before arriving at the Altean colony Lotor had started. After revealing herself as Lotor's mother and that Voltron killed Lotor, the Alteans swear their allegiance to her. They travel to Oriande where they restructure the planet and build several Robeasts before sending the first one, piloted by Luca, to Earth.
68	3	"The Prisoner's Dilemma"	Eugene Lee	Erik Bogh
The Paladins and Atlas attack a Galra base run by Warlord Lahn, whom the Paladins had previously helped aboard the Omega Station. Lahn, however, rebuts any of their attempts at becoming allies, due to feeling abandoned by Voltron after making their alliance when Sendak attacked them. An alert from Lahn's missing fleet that had gone to salvage weapons from another base comes in and he is taken with the Paladins to investigate. They discover the wreckage of the entire fleet, caused by the superweapon created by Warlord Ranveig, that Krolia had previously set loose to allow her and Keith to escape during their first mission together. They are able to destroy the creature by setting the ship to self-destruct and Lahn, finally convinced of the Paladins and their heroism, agrees to join the Coalition and urges other Galra to do so as well.
69	4	"Battle Scars"	Michael Chang	Joshua Hamilton
The Paladins split up from the Atlas to search for signs of another Robeast, similar to the one that attacked Earth, but find nothing for days. When they decide to stop at Olkarion, they discover that the planet is lifeless and about to be consumed by a Weblum. While Keith, Lance and Hunk hold it off, Pidge and Allura try to find out what happened. By tapping into her connection with nature and the Olkari, Pidge is able to see the events that transpired: a Robeast arrived on Olkarion, attacked and stole the Olkari cube weapons built by Branko. The planet was unable to survive the attack due to its Quintessence syphoning abilities, and the Olkari were forced to evacuate their planet. The Weblum begins consuming Olkarion, but Pidge is able to acquire useful information from the Olkari in tracking the Robeasts.
70	5	"The Grudge"	Rie Koga	Rocco Pucillo
Acxa struggles in adjusting to the Atlas crew, remaining aloof and distant until she finally feels accepted by Veronica. Meanwhile, the Paladins and Atlas plan to meet up, but when the Paladins arrive at the meeting place, they are ambushed by a Galra ship. Forced to abandon their lions and suits, they struggle to survive without weapons or armor in a toxic environment that will slowly kill them. The Atlas eventually figures out the ruse and arrive in time to help Lance, Allura, Pidge and Hunk. Keith, however, is attacked by the group's leader: Zethrid, who wants revenge on Keith for what he did to her and for taking Ezor from her. She overpowers Keith just as the Atlas crew arrive. Acxa tries to reach out to her former friend, telling her that Ezor left her because of all the hate and anger Zethrid held onto. Zethrid is subdued and imprisoned on the Atlas, where Acxa refuses to give up on her friend as Ezor appears beside her.
71	6	"Genesis"	Eugene Lee	Mitch Iverson
The Atlas heads to Oriande to confront Honerva and her machinations. Honerva sends Robeasts to various planets to syphon their Quintessence and send them into the Olkari cubes to amplify their power. The planets are successfully evacuated in time, but Honerva sacrifices the White Lion in order to bring back Lotor's Sincline mech from the Quintessence field. Allura, fueled by rage, coldly attempts to kill Honerva, but Honerva threatens to destroy Lance and the Red Lion, causing Allura to miss. Honerva flees Oriande as the planet becomes unstable and the white hole leading to it begins to close. The Paladins and Atlas are able to escape just in time, but despair at not being able to stop Honerva.
72	7	"Day Forty-Seven"	Michael Chang	Joshua Hamilton
Kinkade, one of the MFE fighter pilots, documents day forty seven aboard the Atlas to show what it is like. Rizavi, seeing what he is doing, joins in to make a more exciting movie. They interview various members of the crew such as the Paladins, Kolivan, Coran and Colleen Holt while the camera gets lost during a battle and found by Bae Bae, the Holt family dog, and the Space Mice. During this time, the Atlas has captured a sixth Altean pilot of the Robeasts, but all refuse to speak to Allura and Romelle. Later, Kinkade documents Hunk's attempts at making an Altean cake in order to get the Alteans to open up. It is successful and they agree to speak with Allura and Coran.
73	8	"Clear Day"	Rie Koga	Erik Bogh
Tavos, one of the Alteans, speaks with Allura, but when Honerva interferes, Allura is able to extract a small, dark creature from him, which is what allows Honerva to spy through and control them. The creature is contained for the moment while the Atlas investigate increased activity on a planet. This planet turns out to be the same one from the Voltron Show tour that Coran had gotten the date wrong, as the citizens can only come out on one day per year when the weather is clear. Despite still being angry over their failure to show up, the leader invites them to attend as free security. Everyone heads down to enjoy carnival festivities while Allura stays behind to rest. Keith and Hunk get stuck on a ride, Coran wins a Yalmor imitation contest, Lance and Pidge both try to win prizes for Allura while Shiro wins an arm wrestling contest and defeats the reigning champion: a reformed Beta Traz Warden. As she is resting, she is tormented by haunting visions of Lotor, Lance and her own mother, all convincing her to use the dark creature to stop Honerva. She gives in and allows the creature to fuse with her body, and passes out.
74	9	"Knights of Light, Part 1"	Eugene Lee	Mitch Iverson
When Allura wakes up two days later, she decides to use the dark entity to her advantage. Despite disapproving of Allura's decision to take in the dark creature, the team nonetheless decide to use its connection to Honerva to see into her mind and hopefully figure out her plans. As they reach Honerva's mind, all the Paladins - except Keith - are pulled in and forced to fight corrupted versions of the original Paladins. Once defeated, the original Paladins are restored and freed from Honerva's corruption. Paladins old and new reunite outside Honerva's mind and Allura is reunited with her father. Despite his warnings of the dark creatures and how they led to Honerva's corruption, Allura presses on and they are able to enter Honerva's subconscious.
75	10	"Knights of Light, Part 2"	Michael Chang	Erik Bogh
As they travel deeper into Honerva's mind, they are attacked by the Robeast Myzax, one of the guardians installed to protect Honerva's secrets. The old Paladins hold it off while the new Paladins press on and discover more about Honerva's past and how - as Haggar - she killed Gyrgan, Blaytz and Trigel. They keep going and encounter a second guardian in the form of Zarkon's Robeast armor. The old Paladins arrive to help and once it is defeated, it reverts to an uncorrupted Zarkon. They discover that Honerva's desire is to be reunited with her family. However, because Zarkon and Lotor are both dead, they deduce that she plans on using Lotor's Sincline mech to pierce into another reality where she can have her happy ending. Doing so, however, will result in the destruction of other realities. Honerva becomes aware of their presence in her mind and the Paladins are able to escape with the help of the old Paladins. However, when the new Paladins return to the real world, Allura is comatose.
76	11	"Uncharted Regions"	Rie Koga	Joshua Hamilton
The Atlas crew race to stop Honerva, who uses her own mech to search for the reality where she can live happily with her family. Using the dark creatures, Honerva takes control of the Alteans aboard the Atlas, and uses them to siphon and channel the energy from the Castle of Lions crystal that powers the Atlas. Merla, one of the Robeast pilots, is horrified at Honerva's willingness to sacrifice her fellow Alteans, and turns against her. Lance is able to bring Allura back from her coma. Hunk arrives with a Balmera, but Honerva siphons its energy as well, allowing her to fuse her own mech with Lotor's Sincline.
77	12	"The Zenith"	Eugene Lee	Joshua Hamilton
Despite their efforts, Honerva is victorious and opens a rift in reality. Since Voltron is made of the same material, only it and not the Atlas can follow after her, but they do not stand a chance against Honerva's fused mech. Several more Balmera arrive and imbue Voltron and the Atlas with enough energy to fuse them together, allowing them to pursue and match Honerva. The Paladins and Shiro enter the rift while Coran tries to think of a way to stabilize it. Coran has each of the Alteans placed on a Balmera to channel energy to stabilize the rift, with the Galra fleet led by Krolia and Kolivan arriving as well to provide aid. Voltron-Atlas continues pursuing Honerva through various alternate Alteas, each of which is crumbling into nothingness as a result of Honerva's tearing apart of reality. She arrives at her destination, appearing before Zarkon, who is elated to see his wife back, as Honerva had died in that reality. They travel to Altea, where a young Lotor is being raised in accordance with Honerva's wishes, but Lotor rejects her, knowing that she is not really his mother. When Honerva shows her true evil colors in her angry response to Lotor's rejection, Zarkon also declares that she is not his wife and calls for her to be arrested. Voltron-Atlas arrives and, heartbroken and angry at their rejection, Honerva decides to destroy all realities.
78	13	"The End is the Beginning"	Michael Chang	Joaquim Dos Santos; Lauren Montgomery
Voltron-Atlas engages Honerva's mecha in the alternate Altean reality. Honerva gains the upperhand and travels to the source of all realities. Enraged by her loss, Honerva coldly eliminates each and every reality from existence. After a desperate battle, they are able to stop Honerva from destroying the last reality. They work to convince her that while life is hard and rough, it is still gorgeous and vibrant, something Allura reminds her of by showing Honerva her memories. Allura convinces Honerva to help her undo what she has done and repair the damage, knowing that it will require both of them to sacrifice their lives. After saying a tearful farewell to the team, and giving Lance Altean markings, Allura and Honerva sacrifice their lives to restore all the destroyed realities. The original Paladins and Lotor appear and Allura and Honerva move toward them, signifying their deaths. The team find themselves in their home universe with Altea and Daibazaal restored. One year later, Keith declares that the Galra Empire shall be restored to its former peaceful glory before Zarkon's rise and that they will join a new Galactic Coalition being formed with Earth at its center. Pidge is working with her brother to create a robot named Chip while her father is perfecting Teluduv technology while also using the Green Lion for it. Later, Pidge travels to Altea for the first celebration of Allura's memory. Coran has been overseeing reconstruction of a new Castle of Lions with Merla's help and organizes a dinner in front of the statue erected in Allura's honor. That night, the Lions of Voltron, their long task now finished and the universe at peace, share a silent farewell with the Paladins and leave for parts unknown. A series of clips show what the Paladins went on to do. The Holts work to create the next generation of Legendary Defenders. Hunk began a culinary empire, bringing races together one meal at a time under the philosophy that full stomachs brings happy lives. Lance is spreading Allura's message of peace and togetherness while also working on the family farm. Kolivan and Krolia become the Galra representatives of the Galactic Coalition while Keith turns the Blades of Marmora into a humanitarian relief organization, with Acxa, Zethrid, and Ezor among its ranks. Shiro retired from fighting and married an Atlas crew member, Curtis. In a post-credits scene, the lions fly through space with a silhouette of Allura among the stars. Note: The end credits include dedications to the memory of Seok-Jin Jang, an animator for the series, and Yih-Yun Jang, both of whom died in a 2017 car crash in South Korea during production.
