= Superman/Shazam!: The Return of Black Adam =

2010 American film directed by Joaquim Dos Santos

- DVD cover
- Directed by: Joaquim Dos Santos
- Written by: Michael Jelenic
- Based on: Superman by Jerry Siegel and Joe Shuster Captain Marvel / Shazam! by Bill Parker and C. C. Beck
- Produced by: Bobbie Page; Alan Burnett; Joaquim Dos Santos; Sam Register; Bruce Timm
- Starring: George Newbern; Jerry O'Connell; Arnold Vosloo; Zach Callison; James Garner; Kevin Michael Richardson; Danica McKellar; Josh Keaton
- Edited by: Margaret Hou
- Music by: Benjamin Wynn; Jeremy Zuckerman
- Production companies: Warner Bros. Animation; Warner Premiere; DC Comics
- Distributed by: Warner Home Video
- Release date: November 9, 2010
- Running time: 25 minutes
- Country: United States
- Language: English

Superman/Shazam!: The Return of Black Adam is an American 2010 direct-to-video animated superhero short film co-produced and directed by Joaquim Dos Santos and written by Michael Jelenic, about the DC Comics characters Superman and Captain Marvel / Shazam cooperating to battle the powerful villain Black Adam. George Newbern and Jerry O'Connell reprised their roles from the DC animated series Justice League Unlimited as the two leads.

Released on November 9, 2010 as the main feature on the compilation DVD DC Showcase Original Shorts Collection, Superman/Shazam!: The Return of Black Adam was the fourth (and to date, longest) of the DC Showcase series, which were also included in extended versions. It marked James Garner's last performance before his death in 2014.

== Plot ==
In Fawcett City, Billy Batson is an orphaned boy who has recently been kicked out by his foster parents and is living alone in a rundown slum. Upon arriving at a local diner to meet up with journalist Clark Kent, who is writing an article about his situation, Billy is attacked by Black Adam, who announces his intention to murder the young boy before the "Wizard" can get to him. Clark distracts Adam, allowing Billy to escape while he transforms into Superman. Adam chases Billy through the streets, but Superman intervenes and battles him.

Billy flees into the subway with the help of a homeless man he had unsuccessfully tried to protect from bullies earlier. Adam corners Billy on the train tracks, only for the latter to apparently get run over by a train. Billy then awakens and discovers he is on an empty subway car that takes him to a gigantic cave. There, he meets the wizard Shazam, who informs him that he is the next Chosen One; Shazam explains that Adam used to be his champion 5,000 years ago but turned against the wizard upon deciding that he should rule humanity rather than protect it. Banished to the ends of the universe, Adam now seeks vengeance. To atone for his mistake of creating Adam, Shazam bestows his powers upon Billy and causes a cave-in, after which he tells Billy to say his name if he needs help.

Upon arriving outside, Billy confronts Adam and, upon saying Shazam's name, is instantly transformed by a bolt of lightning into an adult superhero version of himself codenamed Captain Marvel, with the transformation being reversed in the same manner. As Captain Marvel and Superman join forces to battle Adam in the skies, Adam, realizing he cannot defeat both of them, destroys a dam that threatens to flood the city. While Superman diverts the flood, Adam takes a motorist as hostage and tells Captain Marvel to surrender himself in his mortal form to secure her release. He complies, only for Adam to throw his hostage into the sky and silence Billy before he can attempt to rescue her. The woman is then rescued by Superman, who attacks Adam and frees Billy, allowing Billy to transform back into Captain Marvel and quickly defeat Adam.

Just as Captain Marvel is about to kill him in a blind rage, Superman intervenes and forces Billy to recognize that he must be better than Adam; the villain angrily declares that only death will stop him just as the homeless man reappears and reveals himself to be Billy's guardian angel Tawky Tawny. Tawky reverts to his true form as a tiger and threatens to have the Wizard banish Adam even further across the universe. Unwilling to be banished again, Adam shouts "SHAZAM!", reverting to the mortal Teth-Adam and dying from old age.

Days later, Billy reads Clark's article on the newspaper when the same bullies he encountered earlier confront him. They try to intimidate him into saying just one word before they attack, but Billy simply smiles and a bolt of lightning strikes, implying he has said "SHAZAM!" and transformed into Captain Marvel once more.

== Voice cast ==
- George Newbern as Kal-El / Clark Kent / Superman
- Jerry O'Connell as Captain Marvel
  - Zach Callison as Billy Batson
- Arnold Vosloo as Teth-Adam / Black Adam
- James Garner as Shazam
- Kevin Michael Richardson as Tawky Tawny
- Danica McKellar as Sally
- Josh Keaton as Punk, Sally's Boyfriend (uncredited)

== Music ==
A soundtrack album featuring the film score by composers Benjamin Wynn and Jeremy Zuckerman was released by La-La Land Records on April 12, 2011. This release was a limited edition of 1,000 units and additionally featured music from the Green Arrow, Jonah Hex, and the Spectre animated shorts of the DC Showcase series.
