= Gbanga =

Swiss mobile social gaming platform

- Type: Apple iOS and Android game developer and producer
- Industry: Video games
- Founded: April 2, 2007; 19 years ago
- Founders: Matthias Sala; Julio Perez
- Headquarters: Militärstrasse 90, Zurich, Switzerland
- Area served: Worldwide
- Key people: Robin Bornschein; (CGO); Werner Sala; (CFO); Matthias Sala; (CEO)
- Products: Mobile games: Innovetica, Advocates of Light, smart urban golf, Gross. Stadt. Jagd., Urban. Hunt., Galaxy Invaders VR, Bumble Bee, Famiglia, Pilotifant, Quiz and Fly; Video games: Voltron: Cubes of Olkarion
- Owner: Millform AG
- Number of employees: 14
- Website: gbanga.com

Gbanga is a geolocation-based social gaming platform for mobile phones developed by Zurich-based startup, Millform AG. The platform runs on real-time locative media, developed in-house, which means that the gaming environment changes relative to the player's real-world location. Players can interact with each other using built-in social and chat functions, which indicate their current real-world locations as well as online and offline status. Additional features enable social gaming in forms such as exploring, collecting and trading.

== Games ==
=== Gbanga Zooh (2009) ===
Gbanga Zooh was the first game to be published on the platform in August 2009, in cooperation with Zurich Zoo. The game encouraged players to maintain virtual habitats across the Canton of Zurich in order to attract and collect endangered species of animals.

=== Gbanga Santa (2009) ===
The advent calendar game, Gbanga Santa, was launched in December 2009 in Zurich. Players solved puzzles to find the real-world locations of virtual gifts scattered around the city. Once found and collected, virtual gifts were then tradable for prizes provided by sponsors.

=== Gbanga Famiglia (2010) ===
April 2010 saw the launch of Gbanga Famiglia, a game in which players can join or start their own Mafia Famiglia to take-over virtual establishments they discover whilst walking around the city. Establishments are linked to real-world establishments, so players must physically move between locations to play. A successful take-over depends on the Famiglia's power, determined by the number of Famiglia members and the cash total for special items collected.

=== Famiglia Rise and Fall (crowd-funding; discontinued) ===
In 2014, the sequel game Famiglia Rise and Fall was announced on crowd-funding platform Indiegogo. The yet to be developed game technology is described to be an evolution of the previously 2-dimensional games that used flat material only. The new game uses the 3D engine Unity and renders a 3-dimensional world based on open data from OpenStreetMap. Apparently, Millform AG, the company behind Gbanga decided to use crowd-funding for financing the project to be more independent from traditional publishers.

=== Gross. Stadt. Jagd. (2015, 2016) ===
The commissioned mixed-reality game Gross. Stadt. Jagd. (or Urban. Hunt. in English) was performed in May 2015 in Zurich. In a mixed-real manhunt, several thousand participants equipped with a GPS app were running in the streets of Zurich to avoid the hunter, a sponsored car. The real-time app synchronized the GPS positions of all participants and evaluated the last man standing.

=== Voltron: Cubes of Olkarion (2019) ===
In 2018, NBCUniversal announced the video game Voltron: Cubes of Olkarion, the winner of their developer competition Universal GameDev Challenge that had offered game developers the opportunity to use some of Universal's IP. In 2019, Voltron: Cubes of Olkarion which is based on the Voltron: Legendary Defender series, was made available on the Steam store in Early Access, the platform's experimental game program. In the game, players compete in real-time player vs player (PvP) game battles by placing own and destroying opponent blocks with different features in a game board with a grid.

== Technology ==
The J2ME-based version uses a real-time locating system referencing a network of cell sites to determine the player's location, whilst the iPhone version of the platform uses GPS. The platform is available worldwide as an application download for the iPhone and J2ME compatible phones.

Whilst Gbanga studio continues to develop games in-house, the playing community itself can also generate interactive content using Gbanga's Puppetmaster API, coded with Lua (programming language).

In later productions, such as Voltron: Cubes of Olkarion, game engine Unity was used.

== Awards ==
Gbanga was nominated for Business Idea 2010 by Internet World Business, shortlisted for Best of Swiss Web Award 2010 and shortlisted in the category of Best Real World Game for the International Mobile Gaming Awards.

In 2011, Gbanga won the AppCircus Spotlight on Blackberry, hosted in Barcelona.

In 2019, Gbanga's real-time strategy video game Voltron: Cubes of Olkarion, based on the Voltron: Legendary Defender TV show, was entered into and won the 2018 Universal GameDev Challenge where over the course of six weeks, over 500 entries from contestants in over 60 countries were submitted.

== See also ==
- Locative media
- Alternate reality game
- List of alternate reality games
- Location-based game
