= The Rise of Voltron =

- Voltron: Legendary Defender episode
- Episode no.: Season 1 Episode 1
- Directed by: Joaquim Dos Santos; Lauren Montgomery; Ki Hyun Ryu; Eugene Lee; Steve In-Chang Ahn
- Written by: Tim Hedrick; Joshua Hamilton; May Chan
- Original air date: June 10, 2016
- Running time: 68 minutes

Episode chronology
← Previous —	Next → "Some Assembly Required"

"The Rise of Voltron" (also known by the individual episodes "The New Alliance", "From Days of Long Ago", and "Defenders of the Universe") is the first three episodes of Voltron: Legendary Defender. It was directed by Joaquim Dos Santos and Lauren Montgomery and written by Tim Hedrick, Joshua Hamilton and May Chan. In this episode, three cadets at the Galaxy Garrison: Lance, Pidge, and Hunk along with Garrison dropout Keith, and Takashi 'Shiro' Shirogane, the leader of the Defenders of the Universe, who was captured by the villainous Galra Empire a year before the events of the series, are tasked by Princess Allura of Altea with finding five robotic lions to form Voltron.

== Plot ==
During a mission to Kerberos, one of Pluto's moons, an expedition team, consisting of Shiro, Matthew Holt, and Samuel Holt, is attacked and imprisoned by a hostile alien craft from the Galra Empire while Galaxy Garrison—Earth's primary institution for space exploration—has presumed them dead. One year later on Earth, Garrison cadets Lance, Pidge and Hunk witness a vessel crash land and learn it contains Shiro, who has been quarantined after escaping from the Galra. As they form a rescue plan, Keith—a talented, but reckless academy washout—arrives and rescues Shiro before the five of them escape into the desert. Shiro is unable to remember anything from his captivity, but the group is able to determine the Galra are searching for a weapon known as "Voltron". Using what they know, they find a large robotic blue lion hidden in the desert and learn that Voltron is a robot formed from the blue and four other robot lions. The Blue Lion accepts Lance as its pilot and takes the five through a wormhole to the Castle of Lions on Arus, where they find Princess Allura, her royal advisor Coran and four space mice in cryostasis. Upon awakening, Allura is shocked to discover that 10,000 years have passed since they were placed in cryostasis. Haggar, advisor of Zarkon, leader of the Galra Empire, senses Allura's return and Zarkon sends Galra troops commanded by Sendak after them. Allura names the others as Voltron Paladins, bestows them with armor and bayards (the Paladins' weapons) and tasks them with finding the other lions. Lance and Hunk retrieve the Yellow Lion while Shiro accompanies Pidge to find the Green Lion. The Red Lion, as it is unfortunately revealed, is in the hands of the very Galra ship advancing on Arus. Unsure of whether to run or fight, Allura consults the artificial intelligence formed by the memories of her father, King Alfor, who admits he was wrong to hide Voltron and encourages her to fight. Keith, Shiro and Pidge infiltrate the ship so Keith can find the Red Lion while Shiro and Pidge, who repurposes a Galra drone dubbed "Rover", search the ship for prisoners, revealing to Shiro his father and brother were the other missing astronauts from the Kerberos mission Shiro was on. With all four lions retrieved, the Black Lion is released from the Castle and selects Shiro as its Paladin. All five Paladins use their lions to fight the Galra, and succeed in uniting to form Voltron and destroying Sendak's ship before accepting their new roles as the Defenders of the Universe.

== Reception ==
"The Rise of Voltron" received positive reviews. Sarah Moran, writing for ScreenRant, called the premier "A worthy comeback" citing its "brisk pace" that quickly establishes its main characters as well as its "almost ridiculous amount of exposition, serving both to remind older viewers and bring those new to the concept up to speed." Moran also gave positive mention to the artstyle, calling it "sleek and modern" comparing it favorably to Dos Santos and Montgomery's previous series Avatar: The Last Airbender and The Legend of Korra as well as Young Justice.

Collider's David Trumbore gave the episode 4 out of 5 stars, calling it a "great origin story" that "serves to bring newcomers and longtime fans alike up to speed on the new voices playing old characters". While Trumbore had a few qualms with some of the changes made from the original series such as Keith not being the leader and piloting the black lion he noted that most of the other changes were "minor" and that his introduction and arc setup were "quite promising", in conclusion he called the series "a worthy successor", the animation "beautiful to behold" and the action "fast-paced and fun while striking a balance with the show’s comedic and sometimes touching character moments.

Dr. Zaius, writing for Geeks of Doom, gave the episode a positive review citing its "genuinely funny moments" and signaling out Hunk as his favorite character, comparing him positively to Tyler Labine's performance as Dale in Tucker & Dale vs. Evil. However, he was "glad" that the rest of the episodes were only 23 minutes long, as the 70-minute pilot felt "too long at times".
