= Voltron: Legendary Defender =

2016 American animated science fiction television series

- Genre: Action-adventure; Science fiction; Mecha
- Based on: Beast King GoLion by Toei Animation; Voltron by World Events Productions
- Showrunners: Joaquim Dos Santos; Lauren Montgomery
- Directed by: Joaquim Dos Santos; Lauren Montgomery; Ki Hyun Ryu; Eugene Lee; Steve In-Chang Ahn; Chris Palmer; Rie Koga; Michael Chang
- Voices of: Josh Keaton; Kimberly Brooks; Steven Yeun; Jeremy Shada; Bex Taylor-Klaus; Tyler Labine; Rhys Darby; Neil Kaplan; Cree Summer; A.J. LoCascio
- Opening theme: Alex Geringas
- Composers: Brad Breeck; Brian Parkhurst
- Countries of origin: United States; South Korea
- Original language: English
- No. of seasons: 8 (in English); 3 (in Korean)
- No. of episodes: 78 (list of episodes)

Production
- Executive producers: Joaquim Dos Santos; Lauren Montgomery (Note: Montgomery is credited as a co-executive producer for the first six seasons); Ted Koplar; Bob Koplar; Yoo Jae Myung
- Producers: Ki Hyun Ryu (Note: Supervising producer.); Choi Go Un; Kim Seul Ki; Lee Soo Kyung; Kim Young Hyun (S1−S6); Han Seong Ho (S7−S8); Park Sang Ah (S7−S8)
- Editor: Jeff Adams
- Running time: 23 minutes 68 minutes (The Rise of Voltron)
- Production companies: DreamWorks Animation Television; World Events Productions; Studio Mir

Original release
- Network: Netflix
- Release: June 10, 2016 – December 14, 2018

Related
- Voltron Force

Voltron: Legendary Defender is an animated mecha television series produced by American companies DreamWorks Animation Television and World Events Productions and South Korean animation studio Mir for Netflix. It is a reboot of the Voltron franchise and the Japanese anime series Beast King GoLion. Its animation is a mix of anime-influenced traditional animation for characters and backgrounds and CGI for Voltron action sequences. Voltron: Legendary Defender is set in a science fiction universe where planetary energy called quintessence can be used to power vehicles and magic. The series follows the adventures of the Paladins of Voltron who must learn to work together to form the legendary robot Voltron and use it to defeat the Emperor Zarkon and the Galra Empire. The series ran from June 10, 2016, to December 14, 2018, having released 78 episodes over 8 seasons.

Voltron: Legendary Defender received critical acclaim, highlighting the series' writing and visuals. Its success has spawned several comics, action figures, and other toys from Playmates Toys.

== Synopsis ==
For millennia, the Galra Empire has plagued the universe by destroying civilizations and enslaving various races. The only threat to the empire is the legendary "Defender of the Universe" Voltron, a 328-foot-tall robot warrior composed of five lion-styled starships whose pilots are known as Paladins. At the crux of the war that ended with the destruction of planet Altea, King Alfor separated Voltron to protect him from falling into the evil Galra King Zarkon's possession. King Alfor sent the Voltron Lions across the universe to different locations to hide them from King Zarkon. Princess Allura, Alfor's royal adviser Coran, and the Altean Castle of Lions were hidden on planet Arus along with the Black Lion.

In the present, the Galra Empire's path of conquest and search for Voltron has led them to Earth's solar system. A group of space pilots—Shiro, Keith, Lance, Pidge, and Hunk—discover the Blue Lion and immediately get swept up into the Galran War. They meet Princess Allura, become the new Paladins, and reunite the five Lions to form Voltron, beginning their fight to liberate the universe from the Galra Empire.

== Cast and characters ==
=== Main ===
==== Voltron: Legendary Defender ====
- Josh Keaton as Lieutenant/Commander Takashi "Shiro" Shirogane:
  The Black Paladin and the pilot of the Black Lion. The leader of the Defenders of the Universe, Shiro was captured by the Galra Empire a year before the start of the series while on a scientific expedition, during which he was given a weaponized prosthetic right arm. A natural, decisive leader, Shiro is calm and always in control. At the end of the second season, Shiro reclaims his personal bayard weapon from Zarkon that enables them to defeat him, but Shiro mysteriously vanishes afterwards. In season three, Shiro wakes up on a Galran battleship. He escapes and is eventually found by the other Paladins. After finding that the Black Lion no longer accepts him as its true paladin, he continues to aid the team by providing guidance and support to them from the Castle of Lions. At the start of season four, Shiro manages to reestablish his bond with the Black Lion when Keith was absent during an intense battle. In season five, he was revealed of being an unwitting mole of Haggar, who can see through his eyes to keep an eye on Lotor. After Keith and Romelle revealed Lotor's true intentions, Haggar takes full control over Shiro, and Keith discovers that the Shiro with them is a clone, while the true Shiro died during the fight at the end of season two, and his soul lies inside the Black Lion. Afterwards, Shiro is revived when Allura uses her powers to transfer his soul from the Black Lion to the clone's body. In season 7, following his return to Earth, he becomes the captain of the Atlas, a Galaxy Garrison battleship, during the fight against Sendak. Throughout the last season (8), Shiro remains the captain of the Atlas and eventually aids in the final battle against Honerva after Voltron merged with the Atlas. At the end of season 8, he married Curtis, a fellow crewmember on the Atlas.
- Kimberly Brooks as Princess Allura:
  The Crown Princess of Altea, the daughter of King Alfor, Allura was the last known female Altean. Pilot and keeper of the Castle of Lions, a structure that is both a castle and a spaceship, Allura granted the new group of Defenders their titles and leads them in their mission to defeat Zarkon and liberate the universe from Galra rule. Allura wishes more than anything to finish her father's work in stopping Zarkon. In season three, she becomes the new pilot of the Blue Lion and replaces Lance as the Blue Paladin (Lance replaces Keith as the Red Lion's paladin). As an Altean, Allura's abilities include the chameleon-like ability to blend in with other species and magical abilities related to quintessence. She has a telepathic bond with some Altean mice that had ended up in the same cryo-pod that she was hibernating inside of. During season 8, Allura and Lance engage in a romantic relationship. At the end of season 8, she and Honerva give their lives to restore all realities after they were destroyed by Honerva in the final battle.
- Steven Yeun as Keith:
  The Red Paladin and the pilot of the Red Lion. Formerly a cadet at Galaxy Garrison academy before being expelled, Keith is an orphan. Sullen and temperamental, Keith spends his time away from the Garrison after he was expelled working on a mystery he discovered after living in the desert, near the canyons where the Blue Lion was residing. In season two, Keith discovers he has Galra blood, apparently from his maternal side of the family. The revelation comes from a knife that associated him with a secret rebel group of the Galra called the "Blade of Marmora", but also ends up straining Allura's trust in him for a while. Due to Shiro's absence, Keith takes over as the head of Voltron as the new pilot of the Black Lion in season three. At the start of season four, Keith steps down from this position and hands it back to Shiro so that he can continue to work with the Blade of Marmora. At the end of season five, Keith is reunited with his Galra mother, Krolia. He rejoins the Paladins in the end of season six, re-assuming command of the Black Lion. At the end of season 8, he dissolves the Galra Empire and transitions the Blades of Marmora into a humanitarian organization.
- Jeremy Shada as Lance:
  The Blue Paladin and the pilot of the Blue Lion. Lance was the fighter pilot of his team at Galaxy Garrison academy. Initially cocky and confident, Lance nicknames himself the "sharpshooter" and the "ladies' man" of the Defenders. The first nickname stuck, the other didn't. Lance maintained a one-sided rivalry with Keith from when the two were at the Galaxy Garrison together, but the two have shown to be an effective team. Lance occasionally has doubts of fulfilling his role on the team. Lance later becomes the new pilot of the Red Lion and right-hand man of Voltron from season three onward. Lance nearly died at the start of season 6, but was saved by Allura's Altean life-giving magic. He and Allura begin a romance at the beginning of season 8. After the final battle with Honerva, Lance gained Altean markings, and returns to live on his family's farm, spreading Allura's message of peace.
- Bex Taylor-Klaus as Katie "Pidge Gunderson" Holt:
  The Green Paladin and the pilot of the Green Lion. Katie disguised herself as a boy named Pidge Gunderson to get into Galaxy Garrison academy to find out what happened to her father and brother who disappeared whilst on the same scientific mission that Shiro was captured on. Being a technical genius, Pidge is the smartest member of the team, able to create specialist modifications for the Green Lion such as a cloaking device. During her time as a Paladin, she eventually rescued her brother, and then her father. Her brother, Matt, kept fighting for a rebel group, and her father, Sam, returned to Earth to warn the Galaxy Garrison about the impending war against the Galra. After the final battle in Season 8, she and her family help establish and lead the next generation of Legendary Defenders (the nature of whom can be seen to be a nod to Vehicle Voltron).
- Tyler Labine as Hunk:
  The Yellow Paladin and the pilot of the Yellow Lion. Hunk was the engineer of his team at Galaxy Garrison academy. A gentle giant with an equally large appetite, Hunk is the heart of the team, lifting them up and inspiring others. In season one, Hunk meets an Balmeran named Shay, whom he develops a kindred friendship with. Like Pidge, his position as the Yellow Paladin doesn't change throughout the course of the show, and in season 3, he helped Allura gain confidence in her newfound position as the Blue Paladin. In season seven, Keith helps Hunk attempt to save his family from Sendak's slave camps. This didn't end up working out though, but Hunk does finally succeed when he and his fellow Paladins liberated Earth from Galran rule, and his family is rescued. At the start of season eight, Hunk encourages Lance to ask Allura out, and even helps him in doing so. Following the final battle with Honerva, he starts up a culinary empire to bring worlds together, one meal at a time.
- Rhys Darby as Coran Hieronymus Wimbleton Smythe:
  The Royal advisor to Princess Allura's family, Coran was the last known male Altean. Energetic and excitable, Coran serves Allura dutifully whilst being fiercely protective of her. Despite his odd and silly character, he is a reliable and steadfast ally to the princess and the Paladins. Coran was also instrumental in getting liberated planets to join the Voltron Coalition in seasons three to five, through shows and speeches that Coran himself organized. After the Castle of Lions was destroyed at the end of season six, Coran is assigned to help aboard the IGF-Atlas as the flight commander. At the end of season eight, he is seen helping put Altea in order and still maintains a great relationship with the former Paladins of Voltron.

==== Galra Empire ====
- Neil Kaplan as King Zarkon: The ruler of the ruthless Galra Empire who has conquered most of the known universe over the last ten millennia. He desires the Lions of Voltron, due to them being a threat to his conquest along with the revelation that he was the former Black Paladin. He originally was a just ruler until he was exposed to quintessence and dark entities while saving the life of his ailing wife Honerva, corrupting him into his current state of being. He battled Voltron in a powerful, experimental mech-like armor in the second-season finale, only to be defeated by Voltron and put into a coma, with his connection to the Black Lion severed. Zarkon is eventually revived by Haggar, but had to wear a suit of armor to keep himself alive and issues a manhunt for Lotor upon learning of his son's schemes against him. In season five, Zarkon fights Lotor in a duel to the death and is slain by his son's hand, being declared dead by the empire. In season 8, Zarkon appears as a corrupted spirit within Honerva's mind as the final guardian of her secrets. His soul is purified by the original and present Paladins after they fight and defeat him, becoming repentant after Allura forced him to remember all the suffering he caused while he was corrupted. The old and new Paladins convince him to help them escape her mind using their combined shared bond to Voltron.
- Cree Summer as Witch Haggar / Lily Rabe as Honerva: Zarkon's primary advisor and high priestess of the Druids, dark mystics who fanatically serve the Galra Empire, combining dark magic and abominable science to arm soldiers with powerful weapons, create giant robotic monsters dubbed "Robeasts" to fight Voltron, and drain the mystical life energy known as quintessence from living things and planets to fuel the Galra Empire. She is eventually revealed to be an Altean alchemist named Honerva, Zarkon's wife who played a role in Voltron's origins ten millennia ago. Her research into quintessence nearly killed her and resulted in being afflicted by the same corruption that transformed Zarkon, losing all memory of her former self until she regained them while reviving Zarkon. She later travels to the mystical realm of Oriande where Altean alchemy originated, learning its secrets while regaining her Altean ability to fully resume her original form as Honerva. While she was absent in season 7, revealed to have removed Lotor's rivals and deceived the Altean colony into becoming her acolytes, Honerva returns as the main antagonist of the final season with the intent to retrieve Lotor's Sincline. But upon finding it and Lotor's remains, Honerva revises her plan to merge the Sincline and with her own personal mech, creating the ultimate Robeast that can tear dimensional rips into other realities. She intended to find a reality where Zarkon and Lotor are still alive, though the tears she creates would destroy other realities. But upon finding her ideal universe only to be utterly rejected by her family, an outraged Honerva decided to destroy all of existence. The Paladins and Allura manage to convince Honerva to stop during their final battle, though she becomes disheartened that there is only one reality left because of her actions. She and Allura work together to use all their Altean magic to sacrifice themselves so they can restore all of existence.
- A.J. LoCascio as Prince Lotor: The son of Zarkon and Honerva, making him a Galra-Altean hybrid. As revealed in flashbacks, due to his parents' corrupted states straining their familial ties with him, Lotor was exiled for embracing Altean culture and sought to destroy the Galra Empire from within. Possessing a Messianic complex, Lotor's ideology that strength comes from worthy followers from conquered worlds, rather than resource expansion and subjugation, is reflected in his personal all-female strike team, who are all half-Galra like himself. He is introduced in the 3rd season when he assumes temporary control of the Galra Empire during his father's comatose state, using his position to secretly build the Sincline ships that he intends to use to gather quintessence. When Zarkon returned to power and branded his son a traitorous criminal upon learning of his project, the prince forms an alliance with the Paladins so he can take the Galran throne after killing his father. However, Lotor's alliance with the Paladins falls apart when the latter group learned that he was harvesting quintessence from some of the surviving Alteans he secretly provided refuge to. Though Lotor justifies his actions as a necessary evil, he snaps over Allura comparing him to Zarkon and fights Voltron in a giant mech formed from his Sincline ships, which has the ability to enter the Quintessence field at will, thus making it an essential part of his ultimate goal: to establish a new Altean Empire that will span all realities. Lotor takes the fight into the Quintessence field and becomes mad with power from the direct exposure to the energy, only to be defeated when Allura used a technique she learned on Oriande to transfer the excess power from Voltron to overload the Sincline. The Paladins are forced to leave Lotor to die in the Quintessence field, with Honerva retrieving his remains while summoning the Sincline back to their reality.

== Production ==
On January 5, 2016, Netflix and DreamWorks Animation announced a new original animated Voltron series to debut in 2016 as a reboot similar to that of Disney's Ducktales reboot, the expansion of their existing multi-year agreement. Voltron was one of several series planned for initial development and debut in 2016, including Guillermo del Toro's animated Trollhunters. Lauren Montgomery and Joaquim Dos Santos, both known for their work on Avatar: The Last Airbender and its sequel The Legend of Korra, served as showrunners, while fellow crew member Tim Hedrick who wrote for Avatar and Korra served as head writer. On March 25, 2016, at WonderCon, it was announced that the voice cast would consist of Steven Yeun as Keith, Jeremy Shada as Lance, Bex Taylor-Klaus as Pidge, Josh Keaton as Shiro, Tyler Labine as Hunk, Kimberly Brooks as Princess Allura, Rhys Darby as Coran, and Neil Kaplan as Emperor Zarkon. Cree Summer later confirmed that she would be voicing Witch Haggar. The first season premiered on June 10, 2016, and consists of 13 episodes.

It was announced at San Diego Comic-Con that the second season would premiere on Netflix in late 2016. A few months later, at New York Comic Con, it was announced that the second season would premiere on January 20, 2017. The second season saw a special premiere at the New York Comic Con on October 7, 2016, where an episode was shown at the Voltron panel. The second season premiered on Netflix on January 20, 2017, and consists of 13 episodes.

The third season premiered on Netflix on August 4, 2017, and consists of 7 episodes. The fourth season premiered in October 2017, and consists of 6 episodes. The series was revealed at WonderCon 2017 to have a 78-episode commitment from Netflix.

The fifth season premiered on March 2, 2018, and consists of 6 episodes.

The sixth season premiered on June 15, 2018, and consists of 7 episodes.

The seventh season premiered on August 10, 2018, and consists of 13 episodes.

The eighth and final season premiered on December 14, 2018, and consists of 13 episodes. The series was removed from Netflix on December 7, 2024.

== Episodes ==
Season	Episodes	Originally released	
Season	Episodes	North America	South Korea
1	13	June 10, 2016	February 2, 2019 (as Season 1)
2	13	January 20, 2017	February 2, 2019 (as Season 1)
3	7	August 4, 2017	December 21, 2019 (as Season 2)
4	6	October 13, 2017	December 21, 2019 (as Season 2)
5	6	March 2, 2018	December 21, 2019 (as Season 2)
6	7	June 15, 2018	December 21, 2019 (as Season 2)
7	13	August 10, 2018	December 3, 2020 (as Season 3)
8	13	December 14, 2018	December 3, 2020 (as Season 3)

== Reception ==
=== Critical response ===
Critical reception
Season	Rotten Tomatoes
1	100% (8.15/10 average rating) (11 reviews)
2	100% (9.6/10 average rating) (5 reviews)
3	100% (9.33/10 average rating) (5 reviews)
4	80% (8.77/10 average rating) (5 reviews)
5	100% (10/10 average rating) (5 reviews)
6	100% (9.87/10 average rating) (5 reviews)
7	100% (8.75/10 average rating) (5 reviews)
8	86% (8.78/10 average rating) (7 reviews)

Voltron: Legendary Defender received widespread acclaim throughout its eight-season run. Reviewers and a number of fans have lauded the series' plot and story arc. The review aggregation website Rotten Tomatoes reported a 100% approval with an average rating of 8.15 for the first season, based on 11 reviews, with Critic Consensus being that "Voltron: Legendary Defender honors its source material with beautifully expressive animation and impactful action."

In reviewing the first season, Max Nicholson of IGN wrote, "DreamWork's Voltron: Legendary Defender delivers exactly the kind of show you've come to expect from the amazing creative team behind The Legend of Korra." He rated the series an 8.9 out of 10. Sarah Moran of ScreenRant similarly gave the series a positive review, writing, "It isn't trying to reinvent or really improve on the original conceit of Voltron, but Legendary Defender is certainly a welcomed take on a classic cartoon; one that should appeal to fans both new and old." Shamus Kelly from Den of Geek gave the series a perfect score, writing, "Seriously, you won't be disappointed. It's something special that doesn't come around often in television."

In reviewing the final season, Jesse Schedeen of IGN wrote, "Minor storytelling quibbles aside, the final season of Voltron: Legendary Defender captures pretty much everything that has made this series great. The action scenes are fantastic. The story combines humor and character drama better than any season before it. These 13 episodes tie up nearly every loose end on a satisfying note and raise the stakes of the show higher than ever." He rated the season 9.1 out of 10, though he admits, "That said, it would be far more effective to see one of these animated shows acknowledge their LGBT heroes from the very beginning and not save moments like these for the literal last minute; with that rushed reveal (after spending no time establishing Shiro's new relationship or even hinting at it), Voltron relies too much on the audience's affection for Shiro to give the moment resonance, rather than earning an emotional response from its storytelling."

Dave Trumbore of Collider gave the season a perfect score, writing, "The final season of Voltron: Legendary Defender rarely stumbles; the same can be said of the series' story overall. Honestly the only shortcoming in the storytelling has to do with the way the narrative has handled romantic relationships; that trend continues here. Overall, Season 8 manages to do the seemingly impossible by ramping up the stakes to the utmost, delivering the most powerful emotional resonance between our heroes and villains yet, and wrapping everything up in a tearful, bittersweet, and fully satisfying way. It's not perfect, but it's as close to perfection as we're going to get in this reality." Shamus Kelly from Den of Geek gave the season a 4 out 5 stars, writing, "The biggest strength of the season is how nearly everyone comes back to play some part in the final season."

Palmer Haasch of Polygon had praised the series, though she criticized the series' LGBT representation. She noted, "The final sequence of the series, like any button on a series finale, was a mixed bag. It was a relief to see Lance reunited with his family; Hunk's establishing a diplomatic culinary empire is nothing short of a perfect arc" concluding, "Ultimately, Voltron, the vision and artistic pursuit of its creators, was never going to quell the concerns of its fanbase. But taken on its own storytelling merits, the final season remained true to the ideas of found family, collective spirit, and empathetic connection. Voltron: Legendary Defender was an honor to follow, and it's certain that the series will be remembered both for its compelling narrative and spirited fandom for years to come."

In reviewing the series as a whole, Jacob Oller of Paste Magazine wrote, "Empathy is Voltron's quintessence, its driving fuel and its prime directive. And now that it's over, those moving on can list the series alongside Korra and Avatar as one of the most impressive of its time."

There were a number of negative reviews, mostly revolving around Shiro's wedding scene and for killing off Allura.

The Official Voltron Podcast, Let's Voltron, stated, "Allura's death, as I saw it for a long time, really, really bothered me. I've got to be frank about it. As a father of a seven year daughter, for a TV-Y7/FV show, to kill off one of the few female prominent characters? I mean we've got a lot of strong secondary characters, but among the paladins it's Allura and Pidge and that's it, it bothered me a lot. To me it's a difficult pill to swallow. To me it came entirely out of left field. I kept me trap shut on social media, but I was bothered by it a lot." When speaking of Lotor's death, "I think it was little rough for children. I literally rechecked the ratings of the series when I saw that happen, and it's TV-Y7/FV... but seeing his body there—it's just. We didn't have to see it there, did we?" In regards to Shiro's wedding, "We were told that any kind of relationship developed, it was gonna happen naturally and stuff like that, and obviously this didn't really happen naturally."

==== LGBT representation ====
While the show had at least five confirmed LGBTQ characters, controversy swirled around its LGBTQ representation. Specifically, it featured three gay characters, Shiro and Adam, who broke up, with Adam dying several years later, and Curtis, a background character introduced in Season 7. At the end of eighth and final season, Shiro is married to Curtis. The series was criticized for its LGBTQ representation. The show was criticized for killing off a gay character, with some saying the show was following a stereotype known as "burying your gays", leading showrunner Joaquim Dos Santos to apologize to fans. Renaldo Metadeen of CBR gave his own take, criticizing the marriage between Shiro and Curtis, calling it "cheap and tacked on," while stating that making a "five-second blip of the wedding...come[s] off as a publicity stunt."

==== Editing ====
Criticism of editing primarily regarded LGBTQ issues, though some were general observations. On October 22, 2018, a series of leaks of the final episode appeared online of the wedding, in which a different character was seen marrying Shiro. With the release of the final episode it is shown as true.

Further controversy followed with the release of the final season, where Shiro is married to Curtis. In the English audio description, Curtis is referred to as Adam though he is once mentioned to be Curtis in the closed captions of a different episode. The error has since been corrected, but a number of fans have noted this as "evidence" of the "tacked-on" nature of the epilogue.

Controversy in Season 8 also swirled around Ezor, a female character who was confirmed to be in a same-sex relationship with fellow general Zethrid. The character's single line of dialogue was pulled from Kimberly Brooks in a previous season. No audio description ever mentions Ezor's survival within "The Grudge" or its following episode. The lack of movement of the character, only blinking and materializing out of thin air, suggests that the character was meant to remain dead and was added back in at the last minute to appease some negativity.

Fans began a petition for the alleged original season (the version that supposedly existed prior to severe editing), to be released. The petition has garnered over 30,000 signatures.

Speaking in an interview with the "Let's Voltron" podcast Joaquim Dos Santos denied the existence of an alternate cut of season eight.

=== Accolades ===
Year	Award	Category	Nominee	Result	Ref.
2017	44th Annie Awards	Best/Animated TV Broadcast Production For Children's Audience	Episode: "Return of the Gladiator"	Nominated	
2017	Kidscreen Awards	Best Animated Series, Teens and Tweens	Voltron: Legendary Defender	Nominated	
2017	IGN's Best of 2016 Awards	Best Animated Series	Voltron: Legendary Defender	Nominated	
2017	64th Annual Golden Reel Awards	Sound and Music Editing - TV Animation	Episode: "The Black Paladin"	Nominated	
2017	Golden Trailer Awards 2017	Best Animation/Family (TV Spot / Trailer /Teaser for a Series)	Voltron: Legendary Defender	Nominated	
2017	6th Annual BTVA Awards	Best Vocal Ensemble in a New Television Series	Voltron: Legendary Defender	Nominated	
2017	6th Annual BTVA Awards	BTVA People's Choice Award for Best Vocal Ensemble in a New Television Series	Voltron: Legendary Defender	Won	
2017	6th Annual BTVA Awards	Best Male Lead Vocal Performance in a Television Series	Jeremy Shada (Lance)	Nominated	
2017	6th Annual BTVA Awards	Best Female Lead Vocal Performance in a Television Series	Kimberly Brooks (Allura)	Won	
2017	6th Annual BTVA Awards	Best Male Vocal Performance in a Television Series in a Supporting Role	Neil Kaplan (Emperor Zarkon)	Won	
2017	6th Annual BTVA Awards	BTVA People's Choice Award for Best Male Vocal Performance in a Television Series in a Supporting Role	Neil Kaplan (Emperor Zarkon)	Won	
2017	IGN's Best of 2017 Awards	Best Animated Series	Voltron: Legendary Defender	Nominated	
2018	Kidscreen Awards	Best Animated Series, Teens and Tweens	Voltron: Legendary Defender	Nominated	
2018	45th Daytime Emmy Awards	Outstanding Interactive Media - Enhancement to a Daytime Program or Series	DreamWorks Voltron VR Chronicles	Nominated	
2018	7th Annual BTVA Awards	Best Vocal Ensemble in a Television Series	Voltron: Legendary Defender	Nominated	
2018	7th Annual BTVA Awards	BTVA People's Choice Award for Best Vocal Ensemble in a Television Series	Voltron: Legendary Defender	Won	
2018	7th Annual BTVA Awards	Best Male Vocal Performance in a Television Series	Rhys Darby (Coran)	Nominated	
2018	7th Annual BTVA Awards	BTVA People's Choice Award for Best Male Vocal Performance in a Television Series	Rhys Darby (Coran)	Won	
2018	7th Annual BTVA Awards	Best Male Vocal Performance in a Television Series in a Supporting Role	A.J. LoCascio (Prince Lotor)	Won	
2018	7th Annual BTVA Awards	BTVA People's Choice Award for Best Male Vocal Performance in a Television Series in a Supporting Role	A.J. LoCascio (Prince Lotor)	Won	
2018	7th Annual BTVA Awards	Best Female Vocal Performance in a Television Series in a Guest Role	Alyson Stoner (Florona)	Nominated	
2018	7th Annual BTVA Awards	BTVA People's Choice Award for Best Female Vocal Performance in a Television Series in a Guest Role	Alyson Stoner (Florona)	Won	
2018	The 2018 ComicBook.com Golden Issue Awards	Best Animated TV Series	Voltron: Legendary Defender	Won	
2018	IGN's Best of 2018 Awards	Best Animated Series	Voltron: Legendary Defender	Nominated	
2019	Golden Trailer Awards 2019	Best Animation / Family TV Spot / Trailer / Teaser for a Series	Voltron: Legendary Defender	Nominated	

== Comics ==
Three comic series detailing events happening in between episodes were announced in January 2016. Taking story ideas that were deemed too outlandish and too epic to be contained in a 23-minute episode from the animated series, these comic series bridges the time lapse between seasons.

Despite original statements of continuing into Volume 4, LionForge opted to cancel its contract. Its only response in regards to the matter was a brief tweet of an article from Geekdad.

=== Volume 1 (2016) ===
The first miniseries consists of five issues, published by Lion Forge Comics. It was written by show head writer Tim Hedrick and Mitch Iverson, and illustrated by Digital Art Chefs. A special cover variant of issue #1 was available at San Diego Comic-Con in 2016, with a limited release of 250 copies. Issue #2 was released on August 2, 2016, followed by issue #3 on October 5, 2016, issue #4 on November 9, 2016, and issue #5 on November 20, 2016. The whole series will be collected in a graphic novel and was initially scheduled for a December 2016 release, but got pushed back to January 3, 2017, then was finally released January 25, 2017, according to Lion Forge. The second series will be announced after the release of the graphic novel. A motion comic of issue 1 with full voice acting by the series cast was released on June 15, 2017, at the DreamWorksTV YouTube channel. The story takes place in between the season 1 episodes "Rebirth" and "Crystal Venom."

Issue	Release Date	Writer(s)	Artist(s)	Collection	ISBN
#1	July 13, 2016	Tim Hedrick; Mitch Iverson	Digital Art Chefs	Voltron: Legendary Defender; Volume 1 RELEASED; JANUARY 25, 2017	9781941302217
#2	August 24, 2016	Tim Hedrick; Mitch Iverson	Digital Art Chefs	Voltron: Legendary Defender; Volume 1 RELEASED; JANUARY 25, 2017	9781941302217
#3	October 5, 2016	Tim Hedrick; Mitch Iverson	Digital Art Chefs	Voltron: Legendary Defender; Volume 1 RELEASED; JANUARY 25, 2017	9781941302217
#4	November 9, 2016	Tim Hedrick; Mitch Iverson	Digital Art Chefs	Voltron: Legendary Defender; Volume 1 RELEASED; JANUARY 25, 2017	9781941302217
#5	November 30, 2016	Tim Hedrick; Mitch Iverson	Digital Art Chefs	Voltron: Legendary Defender; Volume 1 RELEASED; JANUARY 25, 2017	9781941302217

=== Volume 2 (2017) ===
During the Voltron: Legendary Defender panel at WonderCon 2017, it was announced that the second series of five issues would debut in May 2017. The date was pushed back to late June due to production delays., however the date was pushed back on October 4, 2017, where was published where issue 2 and 3 was published on the same day, November 1, 2017, and issue 4 was published on November 15, 2017, issue 5 was published on December 13, 2017, the Vol. 2 Trade Paperback was published on January 31, 2018. The story takes place in between the season 2 episodes "Shiro's Escape" and "Greening the Cube."

Issue	Release Date	Writer(s)	Artist(s)	Collection	ISBN
#1	October 4, 2017	Tim Hedrick; Mitch Iverson	Jung Gwan; Ji-in Choi	Voltron: Legendary Defender; Volume 2: Pilgrimage; RELEASED; JANUARY 31, 2018	9781941302354
#2	November 1, 2017	Tim Hedrick; Mitch Iverson	Rubine; Beni Lobel	Voltron: Legendary Defender; Volume 2: Pilgrimage; RELEASED; JANUARY 31, 2018	9781941302354
#3	November 1, 2017	Tim Hedrick; Mitch Iverson	Rubine; Jung Gwan Yoo; Beni Lobel	Voltron: Legendary Defender; Volume 2: Pilgrimage; RELEASED; JANUARY 31, 2018	9781941302354
#4	November 15, 2017	Tim Hedrick; Mitch Iverson	Rubine; Beni Lobel	Voltron: Legendary Defender; Volume 2: Pilgrimage; RELEASED; JANUARY 31, 2018	9781941302354
#5	December 13, 2017	Tim Hedrick; Mitch Iverson	Rubine; Beni Lobel; Puste	Voltron: Legendary Defender; Volume 2: Pilgrimage; RELEASED; JANUARY 31, 2018	9781941302354

=== Volume 3 (2018) ===
Volume 3 debuted on July 11, 2018. The story is set between season 4 and season 5.

Issue	Release Date	Writer(s)	Artist(s)	Collection	ISBN
#1	July 11, 2018	Mitch Iverson	Gung Gwan Yoo; Ji-in Choi; Rubine; Beni Lobel	Voltron: Legendary Defender; Volume 3: Absolution; Released; January 9, 2019	9786976585055
#2	August 8, 2018	Mitch Iverson	Rubine; Beni Lobel	Voltron: Legendary Defender; Volume 3: Absolution; Released; January 9, 2019	9786976585055
#3	September 12, 2018	Mitch Iverson	Edwin Prasetya; Puste	Voltron: Legendary Defender; Volume 3: Absolution; Released; January 9, 2019	9786976585055
#4	October 10, 2018	Mitch Iverson	Rubine; Beni Lobel	Voltron: Legendary Defender; Volume 3: Absolution; Released; January 9, 2019	9786976585055
#5	November 14, 2018	Mitch Iverson	Rubine; Beni Lobel	Voltron: Legendary Defender; Volume 3: Absolution; Released; January 9, 2019	9786976585055

== Home media ==
The first two seasons were released on DVD in Region 1 by Universal Pictures Home Entertainment on June 12, 2018. The first two seasons were also released in Australia on October 17, 2018. A box set for season 3–6 was released on DVD in Region 1 on June 4, 2019. In 10 years after Netflix removed the show two years ago, Universal received a complete series DVD box set was released in Region 1 on March 31, 2026, as an online-exclusive. It is the first time that seasons 7-8 have been released on DVD.

In Europe, the series was released on DVD in the UK, Italy, and Germany. Seasons 1–6 are available on iTunes, Google Play Amazon Video etc. in the UK.

== Promotion and merchandising ==
To promote the series in between the release of season 1 and 2, a Robeast fanart contest was announced via social media on October 18, 2016. The winner was announced on December 27, 2016, on social media under the username "Zilla B". Several promotional events were run with the online social game platform Roblox.

== Video games ==
=== DreamWorks Voltron VR Chronicles (2017) ===
A virtual-reality video game based on the series, known as Voltron VR Chronicles, was released for Steam, Oculus and PlayStation 4 via PlayStation Network.

=== Voltron: Cubes of Olkarion (2019) ===
A real-time strategy video game based on the series, called Voltron: Cubes of Olkarion, created by indie developer Gbanga, was entered into and won the 2018 Universal GameDev Challenge. The game was released on Steam Early Access on 29 August 2019. On September 19, 2019, NBCUniversal shutdown its game publishing division. Three months later on the December 19, 2019, Voltron: Cubes of Olkarion was briefly removed from the Steam store, but reactivated in June 2020. In the game, players compete in real-time player vs player (PvP) game battles by placing own and destroying opponent blocks with different features in a game board with a grid.
