= DC Showcase: The Spectre =

2010 film directed by Joaquim Dos Santos

The Spectre
- The Spectre Title Banner
- Directed by: Joaquim Dos Santos
- Written by: Steve Niles
- Based on: Jim Corrigan by: Jerry Siegel; Bernard Baily; Spectre by: Jerry Siegel; Bernard Baily
- Produced by: Bruce Timm; Joaquim Dos Santos; Alan Burnett; Bobbie Page; Sam Register
- Starring: Gary Cole; Alyssa Milano; Jeff Bennett; Rob Paulsen; Jon Polito
- Music by: Benjamin Wynn; Jeremy Zuckerman
- Production companies: Warner Bros. Animation; Warner Premiere; DC Comics
- Distributed by: Warner Home Video
- Release date: February 23, 2010
- Running time: 12 minutes
- Language: English

DC Showcase: The Spectre is a 2010 short animated film, directed by Joaquim Dos Santos and written by Steve Niles. Gary Cole played Detective Jim Corrigan, whose suspects are brought to justice by his alter-ego, the Spectre. The film, released on February 23, 2010 as a bonus feature on the Justice League: Crisis on Two Earths DVD, was the first of the DC Showcase series and was included on the compilation DVD DC Showcase Original Shorts Collection in an extended version.

== Plot ==
Foster Brenner, a successful film producer, is killed by a bomb hidden underneath the diving board of his swimming pool. A narration begins stated in city of Los Angeles, people think about the bright lights and glamour of Hollywood but in Tinseltown, fame and fortune can bring the worst out of everyone. Los Angeles Police Department detective Jim Corrigan, the narrator of this story, who was having a relationship with Foster's daughter Aimee, starts investigating despite the case having been assigned to Lt. Brice. Jim interviews Flemming, Brenner's butler, who shows him security footage of two men in ski masks and black clothing entering the complex and placing the bomb. Flemming tells Jim that several of Brenner's longtime collaborators were excluded in his latest films and were very unhappy about it, with Jim asking the names of the suspects.

That night, at a special effects warehouse, special effects designer Drew Flynn sees a man who looks like the deceased Foster, who accuses him of his murder and transforms into the Spectre. The Spectre uses his powers to animate the models and animatronic film monsters to attack and kill Flynn. He then confronts and kills another suspect, Peter McCoy, a stuntman, by crushing him with his car, before inspecting a suitcase of money McCoy was fleeing with.

Arriving at Aimee's house undetected by phasing through the wall, Jim tells Aimee that she is good enough to be an actress in her father's films by playing the innocent girl act. Jim concludes that Aimee was responsible for giving the correct access code for her father's estate to Flynn and McCoy, opening the briefcase and showing her the money, which was the real connection. Aimee tries to distract Jim by asking if they can still be together while taking a pistol out of a desk drawer, but Jim refuses. Aimee then shoots at him, but the bullets pass harmlessly through his body. Jim coldly states that he is already dead before transforming into the Spectre. When Aimee attempts to flee, the Spectre kills her by trapping her in a cyclone of money, causing her to bleed to death after being cut up by the dollar bills.

With his vengeance now complete, Jim transforms back and calmly walks away, unseen by the arriving police. The film ends with Jim narrating about his job to root out evil, with his secret as the Spectre.

== Cast ==
- Gary Cole as Jim Corrigan / The Spectre
- Alyssa Milano as Aimee Brenner
- Jeff Bennett as Foster Brenner, Peter McCoy, Flemming
- Rob Paulsen as Drew Flynn, Lt. Brice, Deandre
- Jon Polito as Police Captain
