= Joaquim Dos Santos =

American storyboard artist and designer (born 1977)

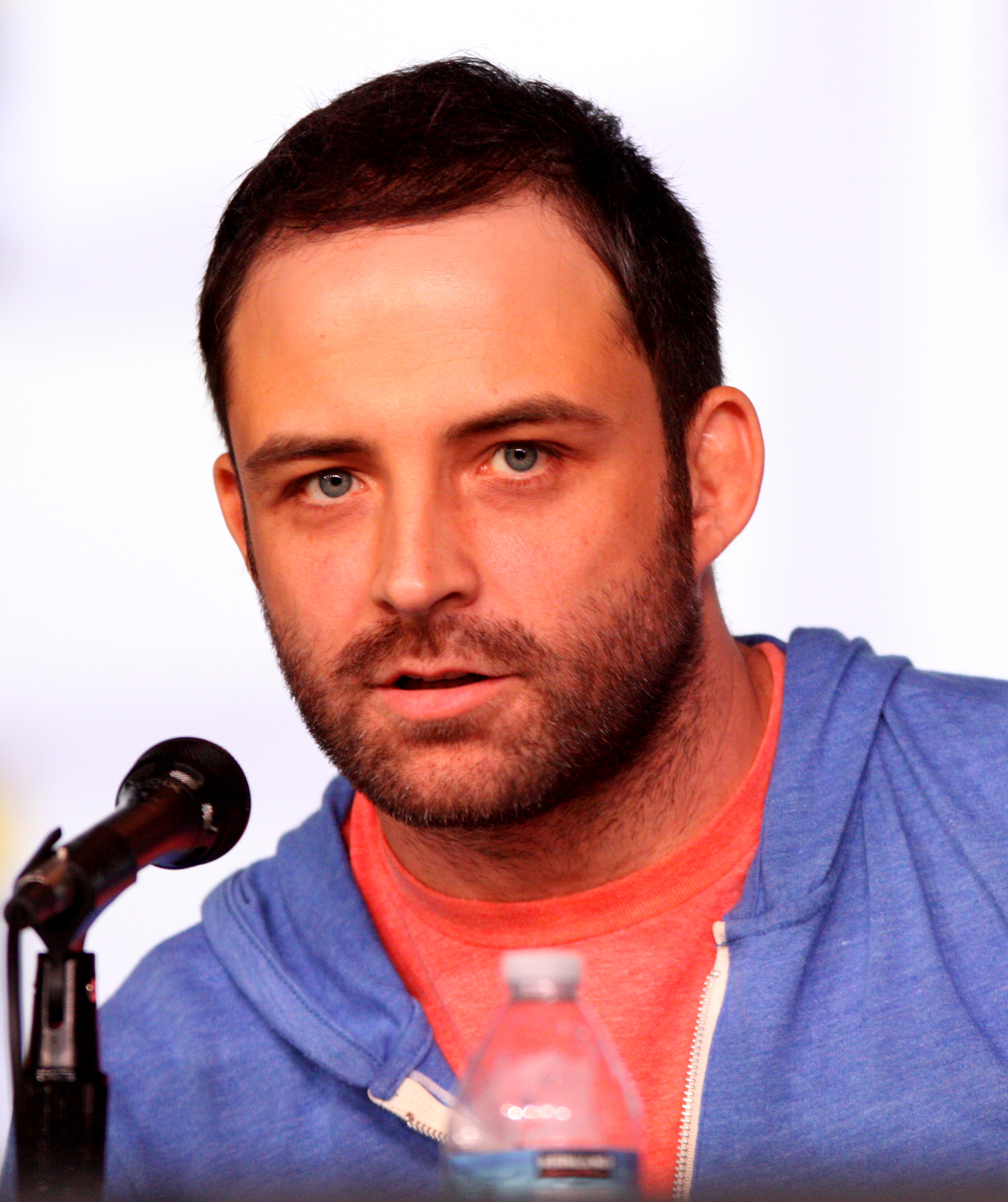
- Dos Santos in 2012
- Born: Joaquim Aranha dos Santos; July 22, 1977 (age 49); Lisbon, Portugal
- Citizenship: Portugal; United States
- Occupations: Storyboard artist; designer; director; producer; writer
- Years active: 2002–present
- Notable work: Justice League Unlimited; Avatar: The Last Airbender; G.I. Joe: Resolute; The Legend of Korra; Voltron: Legendary Defender; Spider-Man: Across the Spider-Verse

Joaquim Aranha dos Santos (born July 22, 1977) is a Portuguese-American storyboard artist, designer, director, producer, and writer. He is known for his directorial work on the television series Justice League Unlimited, Avatar: The Last Airbender, G.I. Joe: Resolute, The Legend of Korra, and Voltron: Legendary Defender. He was also the co-showrunner of Voltron: Legendary Defender. He also co-directed the film Spider-Man: Across the Spider-Verse (2023).

== Early life and education ==
Santos was born in Lisbon, Portugal, and moved to the United States when he was four years old, though he spent his summers in Portugal.

== Career ==
He was a storyboard artist for the animated series Justice League before being promoted in the show's renamed third season. He went on to direct half of the episodes of Justice League Unlimited alongside fellow DC Animated Universe director Dan Riba, including the final episode "Destroyer". He joined the staff of Avatar: The Last Airbender in the middle of the show's second season as a storyboard artist, and began directing episodes in the third season, including the last two parts of the four-part series finale. He would later go on to work on Avatar's sequel series The Legend of Korra, as he co-directed all of the first season alongside Ki Hyun Ryu and served as co-executive producer for the entire series.

He also served as supervising director on the mini-series G.I. Joe: Resolute. After that project, he moved back to Warner Bros. Animation, where he directed two DC Showcase short films: The Spectre (accompanying the Justice League: Crisis on Two Earths direct-to-video movie) and Jonah Hex (on Batman: Under the Red Hood). He also worked as an executive producer and co-showrunner on the animated series Voltron: Legendary Defender with Lauren Montgomery. He directed Spider-Man: Across the Spider-Verse, alongside Kemp Powers and Justin K. Thompson. In December 2024, it was reported that he would not be returning to direct Spider-Man: Beyond the Spider-Verse.

== Filmography ==
Year	Film	Role
2007	The Invincible Iron Man	additional storyboard artist
2007	Superman: Doomsday	storyboard artist (as Joaquim Dos Santas)
2008	Justice League: The New Frontier	storyboard artist
2008	Batman: Gotham Knight	storyboard artist ("Deadshot" segment)
2010	The Spectre	director, producer, storyboard artist, character designer
2010	Jonah Hex	director, producer, storyboard artist, character designer
2010	Green Arrow	director, producer, storyboard artist, character designer
2010	Superman/Shazam!: The Return of Black Adam	director, producer, storyboard artist, character designer
2011	Green Lantern: Emerald Knights	storyboard artist
2023	Spider-Man: Across the Spider-Verse	director
2025	A Minecraft Movie	storyboard artist
2026	Project Hail Mary	storyboard artist
Year	Television series	Role
2000-2001	Max Steel	storyboard artist, storyboard clean-up artist, 4 episodes
2001	Heavy Gear: The Animated Series	storyboard artist, 4 episodes
2001-2004	Justice League	storyboard artist, 22 episodes
2002	He-Man and the Masters of the Universe	storyboards, 1 episode
2004	Justice League: Starcrossed	storyboard, TV movie
2004	Teen Titans	storyboard artist, 4 episodes
2004-2006	Justice League Unlimited	director, storyboard artist, 20 episodes
2006	Legion of Super Heroes	storyboard artist, 1 episode
2006-2008	Avatar: The Last Airbender	director, storyboard artist, additional storyboard artist, background designer, character designer, 12 episodes
2008	The Spectacular Spider-Man	storyboard artist, 2 episodes
2009	G.I. Joe: Resolute	supervising director, art director, character designer, 11 episodes
2012	Tron: Uprising	storyboard artist, 1 episode
2012-2014	The Legend of Korra	director, co-executive producer, art director, storyboard artist, main character designer, Mako's Fan (voice, uncredited), 52 episodes
2016-2018	Voltron: Legendary Defender	director, executive producer, writer, storyboard, 76 episodes
2021-	Invincible	storyboard artist, 2 episodes
2022	The Legend of Vox Machina	main title layout (uncredited), 11 episodes
