= DC Showcase: Jonah Hex =

2010 DtV film

- Title card
- Directed by: Joaquim Dos Santos
- Written by: Joe R. Lansdale
- Based on: Jonah Hex by: John Albano and Tony DeZuniga
- Produced by: Bobbie Page; Alan Burnett; Joaquim Dos Santos; Sam Register; Bruce Timm
- Starring: Thomas Jane; Linda Hamilton; Jason Marsden; Michael Rooker; Michelle Trachtenberg
- Music by: Benjamin Wynn; Jeremy Zuckerman
- Production companies: Warner Bros. Animation; Warner Premiere; DC Comics
- Distributed by: Warner Home Video
- Release date: July 27, 2010
- Running time: 12 minutes
- Country: United States
- Language: English

DC Showcase: Jonah Hex is a 2010 American short animated Western superhero direct-to-video short film directed by Joaquim Dos Santos and written by noted western comics writer Joe R. Lansdale, featuring the voice of Thomas Jane as disfigured bounty hunter Jonah Hex on the trail of a ruthless brothel madame who has murdered his latest quarry. The film, which was released by Warner Home Video on July 27, 2010 as a bonus feature on the Batman: Under the Red Hood 2-Disc Special Edition DVD, was the second of the DC Showcase series and was included on the compilation DVD DC Showcase Original Shorts Collection in an extended version.

== Plot ==
Set in the Old West, a ruthless outlaw named Red Doc who claims he can take on anyone and anything arrives in a local saloon looking for more booze and action. A prostitute named Madame Lorraine spots Red Doc and invites him upstairs as a scared bar girl looks on. Just as they get comfortable, she kills the outlaw, takes his money, and has two henchmen dispose of the body, as she has done to many men in the past.

The next day, the bounty hunter Jonah Hex arrives in the same town, spooking everyone with his disfigurement. After dealing with an arrogant young gunslinger who taunts him, Hex goes into the saloon and asks the bartender about Red Doc, who has a $5,000 bounty on his head, though the bartender claims he never saw him. The bar girl from before informs him about Madame Lorraine, who only offers her services to men with money, who are never seen again. After paying the girl off, Hex buys drinks for the entire saloon to get Lorraine's attention. After joining her upstairs, however, Hex manages to deflect a bullet meant for him by throwing his hat. He knocks out Lorriane and fights her henchmen, quickly killing one with his gun and defeating the other in a brawl by bashing his face into a hot stove and then kicking him over a rail outside the room. The bartender, who was in on Lorraine's scheme, attempts to kill Hex with a shotgun but is easily gunned down; Hex then announces to the patrons that their drinks are on the house.

Hex threatens Lorraine at gunpoint to tell him where Red Doc is. Lorraine leads him to an abandoned mine and shows him a dark hole that leads to a caved-in lower shaft. She and Hex journey down, and it is revealed that Lorraine had murdered at least fifteen men for their money. As Hex finds and secures Red's body, Lorraine tries once more to kill him with a knife she found lodged in one of the bodies, but he anticipates this and knocks her out again. By the time she comes to, Hex is already outside the hole with Red. Lorraine offers to make him her new partner, but Hex responds by kicking down the rope, trapping her there instead of bring her to jail. When Lorraine pleads that he can't leave her all alone, Hex responds by saying that she has plenty of companions, all of whom she knows. As Hex departs, Lorraine trembles as she stares at the corpses of her victims; the only lamp in the shaft slowly goes out, leaving her trapped in the dark.

== Cast ==
- Thomas Jane as Jonah Hex
- Linda Hamilton as Madame Lorraine
- Jason Marsden as Young Man, Bartender
- Michael Rooker as Red Doc
- Michelle Trachtenberg as Bar Girl
