= Lauren Montgomery =

American animation director and storyboard artist

- Born: Lauren Eve Montgomery; May 4, 1980 (age 46)
- Occupations: Storyboard artist, director, character designer, producer, writer

Lauren Eve Montgomery (born May 4, 1980) is an American animator, director, producer, and writer.

== Early life ==
Lauren Montgomery became interested in drawing as a child and then developed an interest in animation. In 1998, she enrolled in the animation program at Loyola Marymount University's School of Film and Television, where she graduated in 2002.

== Style ==
According to Montgomery, "I was definitely influenced by the Disney films. Those were the drawings I was tracing and sketching during my early years. I would study each and every one of the princesses and draw them until I had them all down by heart. My facial features are still influenced somewhat by Disney characters. As I got older, I was definitely influenced by Bruce's style in Batman (referring to Bruce Timm and Batman: The Animated Series), and I started getting into anime, and some of the more subtle styles in anime drawing. The clothing is a little more detailed than the typical American animation – it's more believable, yet still simplified. It's the way they draw bodies and cloth that I kind of incorporate into my drawings, as well as certain aspects of how they would draw hair. So I'd say I have a few different influences in my art style."

== Career ==
Montgomery got her start on the 2002–2004 animated series He-Man and the Masters of the Universe, animated by Mike Young Productions. Montgomery has done storyboards for animated television series, such as Ben 10 from Cartoon Network Studios. She also worked on the Next Avengers: Heroes of Tomorrow and Hulk Vs animated features, based on Marvel Comics properties by Lions Gate Entertainment. Moreover, she worked on the G.I. Joe features for Reel FX Creative Studios and distributed by Paramount Pictures. Montgomery was heavily involved in the animated series Voltron: Legendary Defender, released between 2016 and 2018. She served as executive producer and showrunner, as well as a director on the first four episodes and storyboard artist and writer on others. Her role as executive producer resulted in death threats against her due to the series' final season's controversy around its LGBT characters. Following the conclusion of Voltron, she worked as a supervising producer on Santiago of the Seas.

=== DC animation ===
In television, Montgomery has done storyboard work for the television series Justice League Unlimited, for which producer Bruce Timm praised her work as being quite versatile. Montgomery made her directorial debut by directing several episodes of the Legion of Super Heroes series.

Montgomery was involved with most DC Universe Animated Original Movies that were released between 2007 and 2013. Her first DC film property was as a storyboard artist for the second DC Universe film production, Justice League: The New Frontier, based on the Eisner Award-winning graphic novel by Darwyn Cooke, DC: The New Frontier. She made her film debut as one of the three directors for the direct-to-video feature film Superman: Doomsday, directing the second act of the movie. In March 2008, it was announced that she would be the director for the direct-to-video Wonder Woman film from Warner Premiere. The animated feature was released on March 3, 2009. She continued her directorial film career with the studio, directing Green Lantern: First Flight in 2009, Superman/Batman: Apocalypse in 2010, and co-directing Justice League: Crisis on Two Earths and Batman: Year One alongside Sam Liu.

=== Avatar: The Last Airbender ===
Montgomery provided storyboard work on eight episodes for season 3 of the original animated series Avatar: The Last Airbender, created by Bryan Konietzko and Michael Dante DiMartino. She went on to serve as a supervising producer and storyboard artist on all episodes of the sequel series The Legend of Korra. In 2021, it was announced that Montgomery would direct Avatar Aang: The Last Airbender, the franchise's first animated movie. The film was originally set to be released theatrically in October 2026, but in December 2025, Paramount Pictures moved it to Paramount+.

=== Illustration ===
Montgomery has released a sketchbook with comic book/animation artist Eric Canete entitled Beauty and the Beast, published by Black Velvet Studios. She has also done various freelance illustration works, such as illustrating a cover for Nickelodeon Magazine and a press release illustration for the Avatar series.

== Filmography ==
Year	Film	Role
2006	Curious George	animator (uncredited)
2006	Superman: Brainiac Attacks	storyboard artist
2007	The Invincible Iron Man	storyboard artist
2007	Superman: Doomsday	director, storyboard artist
2007	Ben 10: Secret of the Omnitrix	storyboard artist
2008	Kung Fu Panda	storyboard artist (uncredited)
2008	Madagascar: Escape 2 Africa	storyboard artist (uncredited)
2008	Turok: Son of Stone	storyboard artist
2008	Justice League: The New Frontier	storyboard artist
2008	Next Avengers: Heroes of Tomorrow	storyboard artist
2009	Hulk vs. Thor	storyboard artist
2009	Wonder Woman	director, storyboard artist, character design
2009	Green Lantern: First Flight	director, storyboard artist, character design
2009	Superman/Batman: Public Enemies	storyboard artist
2009	Scooby-Doo! Abracadabra-Doo	storyboard artist
2010	Planet Hulk	storyboard artist
2010	Justice League: Crisis on Two Earths	director, storyboard artist
2010	Superman/Batman: Apocalypse	director, producer, storyboard artist
2010	Batman: Under the Red Hood	storyboard artist
2011	Catwoman	director, producer, storyboard artist
2011	Green Lantern: Emerald Knights	director, producer
2011	Batman: Year One	director, producer
2011	All-Star Superman	storyboard artist
2011	Thor: Tales of Asgard	storyboard artist
2012	Wreck-It Ralph	storyboard artist (uncredited)
2012	Batman: The Dark Knight Returns - Part 1	storyboard artist
2012	Justice League: Doom	director, producer
2013	Batman: The Dark Knight Returns - Part 2	storyboard artist
2013	Justice League: The Flashpoint Paradox	storyboard artist
2014	Penguins of Madagascar	storyboard artist (uncredited)
2015	Batman vs. Robin	storyboard artist
2015	Justice League: Gods and Monsters	storyboard artist
2016	Batman: Bad Blood	storyboard artist
2026	Avatar Aang: The Last Airbender	director
Year	TV-series	Role
2002–2004	He-Man and the Masters of the Universe	storyboard artist, 11 episodes
2003–2005	Clifford's Puppy Days	storyboard artist, 25 episodes
2004–2006	Justice League Unlimited	storyboard artist, 19 episodes
2006–2007	Legion of Super Heroes	director, storyboard artist, 4 episodes
2006–2007	Ben 10	storyboard artist, 2 episodes
2007–2008	Avatar: The Last Airbender	storyboard artist, 8 episodes
2009	G.I. Joe: Resolute	storyboard artist, 11 episodes
2010	Scooby-Doo! Mystery Incorporated	director, "In Fear of the Phantom"
2010–2012	Young Justice	director, storyboard artist, 24 episodes
2011	Batman: The Brave and the Bold	director, storyboard artist, 1 episode
2012	The Avengers: Earth's Mightiest Heroes	storyboard artist, 26 episodes
2012–2014	The Legend of Korra	producer, storyboard artist, 51 episodes
2013	Thunder and Lightning	storyboard artist, 1 episode
2013	Green Lantern: The Animated Series	storyboard artist, 1 episode
2016–2018	Voltron: Legendary Defender	director, writer, producer, storyboard artist, 76 episodes
2020–2021	Santiago of the Seas	producer, 12 episodes
2021	Star Trek: Prodigy	storyboard artist, 2 episodes
