= Loren Lester =

American actor

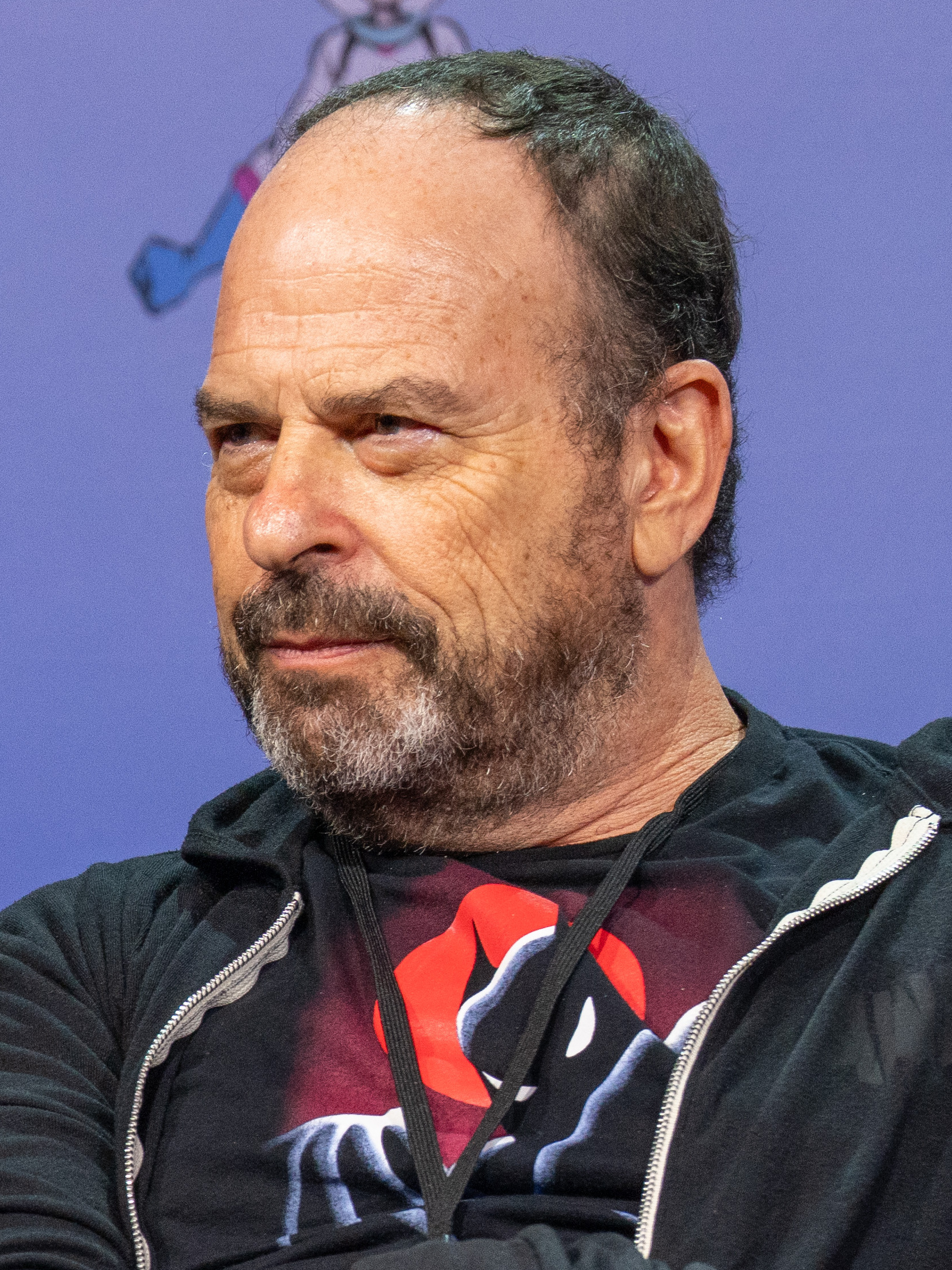
- Lester at GalaxyCon Raleigh in 2025
- Born: Los Angeles, California, U.S.
- Occupation: Actor
- Years active: 1977–present
- Spouse: Kelly Lester (m. 1988)
- Children: 3, including Julia
- Website: lorenlester.com

Loren Lester is an American screen, stage, and voice actor, best known for voicing Dick Grayson / Robin / Nightwing in the DC Animated Universe. He made his Broadway debut in the 2024 revival of Cabaret.

== Career ==
=== Film and television ===
==== Animation ====
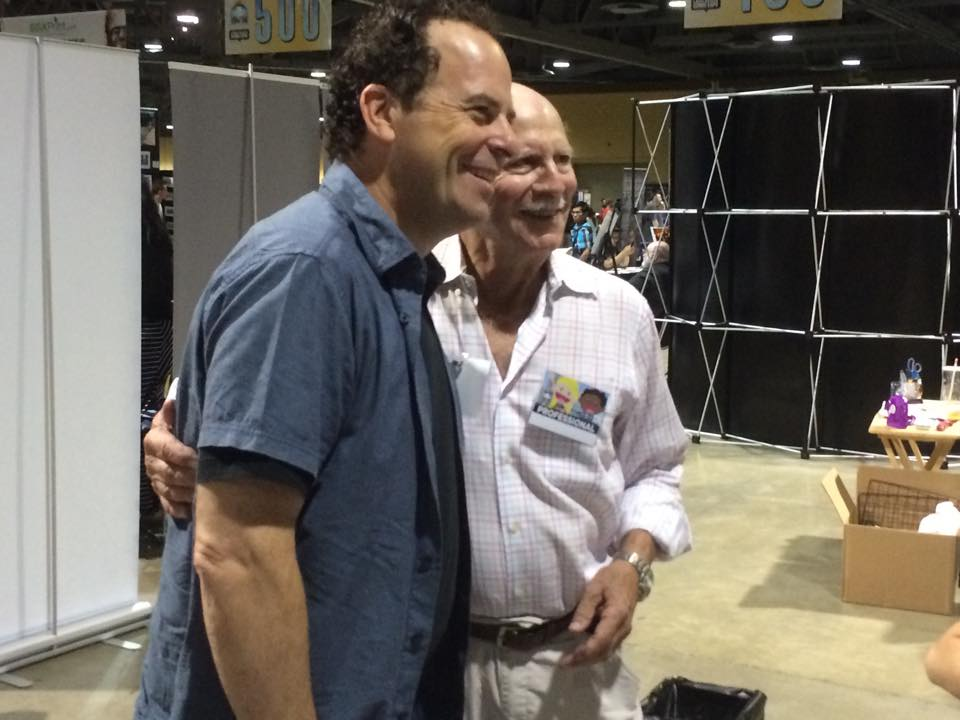
Alan Oppenheimer and Loren Lester posing for a 2015 photograph

He is best known as the voice of DC Comics superhero Dick Grayson/Robin/Nightwing in the DC Animated Universe and Barbeque on G.I. Joe: A Real American Hero.

He later reprised the role of Nightwing in the 2017 direct-to-video, Batman and Harley Quinn.

Lester also voiced the superheroes Hal Jordan / Green Lantern in Batman: The Brave and the Bold and Iron Fist in Ultimate Marvel vs. Capcom 3 and The Avengers: Earth's Mightiest Heroes from Marvel Comics.

His voice has been heard in numerous critically acclaimed audio books and in popular interactive games such as Halo 4 and Batman: Arkham Knight. He provides the voice of Kirk Langstrom / Man-Bat in Batman: Arkham Knight.

In 1990, he provided the voice for Jordan Knight in New Kids on the Block. In 1994, he was also the voice of Gringo in the Don Bluth film Thumbelina.

He also provided the voice for Rick Gordon, Flash Gordon's son, in the 1986 series Defenders of the Earth.

==== Live-action ====
Lester has appeared in over 200 episodes of series including Curb Your Enthusiasm ("The Black Swan" episode) The Orville, Scorpion, I'm Dying Up Here, Parenthood, Bones, NCIS, Ringer, Good Luck Charlie, Awake, The Closer, Desperate Housewives, Cold Case, Criminal Minds, Castle, Two and a Half Men, and many others.

He was the Irate passenger in the Wes Craven film Red Eye starring Rachel McAdams and Cillian Murphy, and he was in the comedies The Sweetest Thing and American Wedding

He began his career very young; one of his early recurring roles was "Roy" in The Facts of Life.

He also played one of the hall monitors, Fritz Hansel, in Rock 'n' Roll High School.

He recurred on all three seasons of the HBO hit comedy series Hung, and had recurring roles on Victorious (Nickelodeon), Gilmore Girls, General Hospital, The Bold and the Beautiful and The Young and the Restless.

Lester also appeared in the Star Trek: Deep Space Nine episode "The Quickening". In 2008, Lester played the role of an ER doctor on Heroes in the episode "The Second Coming".

He has appeared in over 100 radio and television commercials.

=== Stage ===
Lester has starred in dozens of plays and musicals. Currently living in New York, he was seen frequently in the Los Angeles theatre scene at venues such as The Pasadena Playhouse in Noël Coward’s Fallen Angels. He is also a graduate of the Occidental College theatre department.

=== Podcast ===
In March 2023, Lester was announced to have been cast as the superhero Michael Kern / No/One in the Massive-Verse, first playing the character in the podcast series Who Is NO/ONE?.

== Personal life ==
Lester and his wife, Kelly, also an actress and daughter of Peter Mark Richman, have three daughters: Jenny, Lily, and Julia.

== Filmography ==
=== Television ===
Year	Title	Role	Notes
1979	Young Love, First Love	Pevney	Television film
1981–1987	The Facts of Life	Roy	7 episodes
1982	Gimme a Break!	Arnie	Episode: "Julie's First Love"
1985	Charles in Charge	Clarence Norman	Episode: "Charles 'R' Us"
1987	Falcon Crest	Anesthesiologist	Episode: "Missed Connections"
1995	Bonnie	Joe the Toe	Episode: "The Phone Call"
1996	Star Trek: Deep Space Nine	Attendant	Episode: "The Quickening"
2002	Boomtown	Homeowner	Episode: "All Hallow's Eve"
2002–2004	The Practice	Dr. Marchant, Mitchell Gore	2 episodes
2003	Good Morning, Miami	Group Leader	Episode: "Hi, My Name Is Jake"
2004	Without a Trace	Mr. Roscoe	Episode: "Wannabe"
2004	Las Vegas	Lawyer	Episode: "Always Faithful"
2004	LAX	Immigration Attorney	Episode: "Unscheduled Arrivals"
2004	General Hospital	Meyer	8 episodes
2005	Scrubs	Vet	Episode: "My Quarantine"
2005	Gilmore Girls	Anson	2 episodes
2005	Joey	Producer	Episode: "Joey and the Big Break"
2005	Desperate Housewives	Dr. Baker	Episode: "You Could Drive A Person Crazy"
2006	Two and a Half Men	Emcee	Episode: "The Unfortunate Little Schnauzer"
2006	The West Wing	Jarin	Episode: "Welcome to Wherever You Are"
2006	Pepper Dennis	WEIE Attorney	Episode: "True Love Is Dead"
2006	The Suite Life of Zack & Cody	Man	Episode: "A Midsummer's Nightmare"
2006	The Game	Dr. Joe	Episode: "How Tasha Got Her Groove Back"
2006	Help Me Help You	Gabe	Episode: "Raging Bill"
2006–2007	The Bold and the Beautiful	Eli Donovan	4 episodes
2007	7th Heaven	Bob Meyers	Episode: "Deacon Blues"
2007	The Riches	Ed Kline	Episode: "Pilot"
2007	In Case of Emergency	Dr. Green	Episode: "The Good, the Bad and the Mob"
2007	Notes from the Underbelly	Man	Episode: "Million Dollar Baby"
2007	State of Mind	Crisis Counselor	Episode: "Pilot"
2007	Side Order of Life	Doug Stack	Episode: "Coming Out"
2007	Zoey 101	Pierre LaMange	Episode: "Zoey's Ribs"
2007–2008	Criminal Minds	Dr. Shore, Surgeon	2 episodes
2008	Unhitched	Therapist	Episode: "Woman Marries Horse"
2008	Greek	Harvard Dean	Episode: "Barely Legal"
2008	The Closer	Dan Frye	Episode: "Split Ends"
2008	Heroes	ER Doctor	Episode: "The Second Coming"
2009	Castle	Mr. Simmons	Episode: "Always Buy Retail"
2009	FlashForward	Neurologist	Episode: "No More Good Days"
2009	Cold Case	A.J. Pritchard	Episode: "The Crossing"
2009	Curb Your Enthusiasm	Turner	Episode: "The Black Swan"
2009–2011	Hung	Howard Koontz	5 episodes
2010	The Young and the Restless	Dr. Jasper	3 episodes
2010	Undercovers	Hans	Episode: "Devices"
2010–2011	Victorious	Dr. Levinson	2 episodes
2011	Dating in the Middle Ages	James Brownhill	Episode: "Dr. Poo"
2011	Ringer	Aubrey Zimmerman	Episode: "If You Ever Want a French Lesson..."
2012	Awake	Murray	Episode: "Ricky's Tacos"
2012	NCIS	Edgar Cromwell	Episode: "Up in Smoke"
2012	Final Witness	Hans Reiser	Episode: "What the Boy Saw"
2012	Good Luck Charlie	Randy	Episode: "Team Mom"
2012	Help for the Holidays	Daniel	Television film
2013	Bones	William Wiseman	Episode: "The Dude in the Dam"
2014	Reinventing Cassie	Mel	Television film
2014	Parenthood	District Representative	Episode: "You've Got Mold"

=== Television (animated) ===
Year	Title	Role	Notes
1985	G.I. Joe: A Real American Hero	Barbecue	8 episodes
1986–1987	Defenders of the Earth	Rick Gordon, Young Kurt Walker	65 episodes
1990	New Kids on the Block	Jordan Knight	15 episodes
1991	The Legend of Prince Valiant	Messenger, Survivor	Episode: "The Gift"
1992–1995	Batman: The Animated Series	Dick Grayson / Robin	27 episodes
1994	Aaahh!!! Real Monsters	Various voices	2 episodes
1994	SWAT Kats: The Radical Squadron	Guard	Episode: "The Dark Side of the Swat Kats"
1997	Extreme Ghostbusters		Episode: "True Face of a Monster"
1997–1998	The New Batman Adventures	Dick Grayson / Nightwing, Mo	10 episodes
1998	The Sylvester & Tweety Mysteries	Earl Pink	Episode: "The San Francisco Beat"
2001	Men in Black: The Series		2 episodes
2005–2006	W.I.T.C.H.	Julian, Announcer, Aketon, Tynar	8 episodes
2009–2011	Batman: The Brave and the Bold	Hal Jordan / Green Lantern	2 episodes
2012	The Avengers: Earth's Mightiest Heroes	Danny Rand / Iron Fist, Newscaster	2 episodes

=== Film ===
Year	Title	Role	Notes
1979	Rock 'n' Roll High School	Fritz Hansel	
1981	Evilspeak	Charlie Boy	
1990	Prayer of the Rollerboys	Anchorman	
2002	The Sweetest Thing	Mr. Mooney	
2003	American Wedding	Celebrant	
2005	Red Eye	Doctor	
2009	17 Again	Mike's Lawyer	
2011	After the Wizard	Dr. Edwards	
2011	The Hit List	Billy Joe Philbin	
2012	A Green Story	Ernest York	
2013	A Leading Man	Bruce Dodes	
2019	Senior Love Triangle	David	

=== Film (animated) ===
Year	Title	Role	Notes
1994	Thumbelina	Gringo	
1998	Batman & Mr. Freeze: SubZero	Dick Grayson / Robin	Direct-to-video
2017	Batman and Harley Quinn	Dick Grayson / Nightwing	Direct-to- video

=== Video games ===
Year	Title	Role	Notes
1994	The Adventures of Batman & Robin	Dick Grayson / Robin	Sega CD version
2002	Earth & Beyond		
2003	Batman: Rise of Sin Tzu	Dick Grayson / Nightwing	
2004	Spider-Man 2	Richard Parker, Additional Voices	
2005	Ultimate Spider-Man	Richard Parker	
2010	Batman: The Brave and the Bold – The Videogame	Hal Jordan / Green Lantern	
2011	Ultimate Marvel vs. Capcom 3	Danny Rand / Iron Fist	
2011	Kinect Disneyland Adventures		
2012	Halo 4	Additional voices	
2015	Batman: Arkham Knight	Kirk Langstorm / Man-Bat	
2016	View-Master Batman Animated VR	Dick Grayson / Robin	

=== Podcast ===
Year	Title	Role	Notes
2023–2024	Who Is No/One?	Michael Kern / No/One	10 episodes

=== Shorts ===
- The Old Man and the Studio
- Cross-Eyed Dinner Theater Presents! - Alan
- The One Who Got Away
- Going Home
- Down, Up, Out
- Peter at the End
- Red
- The Interrogation
- The Uncivil War
- Up the Valley and Beyond
- A Family of Clowns
- Max
- Terrorists Anonymous
