= The Murder Men =

1961 film

- Directed by: John Peyser
- Written by: Mel Goldberg
- Starring: Mark Richman; Dorothy Dandridge; James Coburn; Joe Mantell
- Cinematography: Harold E. Wellman
- Edited by: William B. Gulick; John Sheets
- Music by: Jeff Alexander
- Production company: Metro-Goldwyn-Mayer
- Distributed by: Metro-Goldwyn-Mayer
- Release date: 1961
- Running time: 73 minutes
- Country: United States

The Murder Men (later presented as an episode of the TV show Cain's Hundred which was called Blues for a Junkman, in 1962) is a 1961 film starring Peter Mark Richman, James Coburn, and Dorothy Dandridge.

== Plot ==
Norma Sherman, is a night-club singer and addict who, upon being released from jail, attempts to win back the love of her husband.

== Cast ==
- Mark Richman as Nick Cain
- James Coburn as Arthur Troy
- Dorothy Dandridge as Norma Sherman
- Joe Mantell as Maury Troy
- Ivan Dixon as Joe Sherman
- Ed Asner as Dave Keller

== Reviews ==
One commentator called Dorothy Dandridge's role in this film "one of (her) most interesting late performances". This was her last film.
