= Tribute to John F. Kennedy =

1963 address by Leonard Bernstein

Tribute to John F. Kennedy is an address given by American composer and conductor Leonard Bernstein to the United Jewish Appeal of Greater New York on Monday, November 25, 1963 in response to the assassination of President John F. Kennedy; and later reprinted in his book Findings (Simon & Schuster: New York, NY 1982 ISBN 978-0671429195).

Words found within the address have been repeated during times of tragedy, including the September 11 attacks, the Sandy Hook Elementary School shooting, 2013 Paris attacks, and the Boston Marathon bombing.

== Background ==
On Friday, November 22, 1963, Leonard Bernstein was preparing for a video tape recording of the Young People's Concerts, when he heard the news that President Kennedy had been shot in Dallas, Texas. His response to those in attendance was: “We must go on. Life goes on.” However, shortly following this declaration, Bernstein replied, “we can’t go on.”

Humphrey Burton wrote: “Bernstein saw Kennedy as a leader with outstanding intellectual gifts and a sympathy for the arts.”

Bernstein once said, “Of all the political men that I have ever met, Kennedy was certainly the most moving and compassionate and lovable.” In 1971, Bernstein wrote Mass to celebrate the opening of the John F. Kennedy Center.

On November 25, 1963, at Madison Square Gardens, the United Jewish Appeal of Greater New York presented its 25th annual “Night of Stars”. Vice-President Lyndon Johnson had been slated to give the address, but due to the assassination of President Kennedy just 3 days prior, Johnson cancelled.

The event became a vigil for those gathered in remembrance of the slain leader. In his stead, Bernstein spoke of shock, shame and despair, ignorance and hatred, and “rage at the senselessness of the crime.”

Bernstein wrote the address just before being commissioned to compose his famous Chichester Psalms.

== Legacy ==
In his book Findings, Bernstein printed the entire address entitled: “Tribute to John F. Kennedy” in 1982.

Even Jeff Richman, Green-Wood Cemetery’s historian in Brooklyn, New York (where Bernstein is buried), quoted the words when interviewed by The New York Times.

Following the death of Freddie Gray in 2015, Baltimore, Maryland enforced a city-wide curfew, which in turn affected the Baltimore Symphony Orchestra. Bernstein protégé, Marin Alsop, conducted the orchestra outside during the day in keeping with her mentor's words.

== Inspired works ==
Several composers and artists have created works based on the text by Bernstein.

Composer Carl Holmquist wrote: “[Bernstein] was the consummate musician, a true force of nature that inspired people like me to want to make music like he did.”. Holmquist composed a piece for band entitled: ‘’Our Reply’’, in response to the Sandy Hook Elementary School shooting in Newtown, Connecticut and the Orlando nightclub shooting in Orlando, Florida.

American composer and conductor Lucas Richman composed “Symphony: This Will Be Our Reply” for orchestra and chorus inspired by the Bernstein quote. It received its world premiere with the Oak Ridge Symphony Orchestra & Chorus on March 30, 2019. The work made its West Coast premiere with the Los Angeles Jewish Symphony on August 17, 2019 at the Walt Disney Concert Hall in Los Angeles.

In response to the Boston Marathon bombing, Walnut Hill School for the Arts performed a production of “Sleeping Beauty”, and elaborated on Bernstein's words: “One of the most natural ways we can respond is by continuing to make and share art.”

In May 2017, composer Aaron Robinson premiered "This Will Be Our Reply To Violence" based on the famous quote by Bernstein. It was the first time the Bernstein Estate had ever granted a composer the rights to set the words to music. Senator Susan Collins said of the premiere: "With the scourge of violence unabated in our times, we all must increase our devotion to the highest ideals of humanity.”

On June 1, 2018, Marjory Stoneman Douglas High School alumni, students, musicians and composers performed a concert called: “Our Reply” in tribute to the Stoneman Douglas High School shooting on February 14, 2018.
