= Defenders of the Earth =

1986 superhero animated television series

- Series logo
- Genre: Superhero; Action/adventure; Science fantasy
- Based on: Mandrake the Magician; The Phantom by Lee Falk Flash Gordon by Alex Raymond
- Written by: Bryce Malek; Dick Robbins
- Directed by: Will Meugniot; John Gibbs; Ray Lee
- Starring: William Callaway; Adam Carl; Ron Feinberg; Buster Jones; Loren Lester; Sarah Partridge; Diane Pershing; Peter Renaday; Lou Richards; Peter Mark Richman; Dion Williams
- Composer: Robert J. Walsh
- Country of origin: United States
- Original language: English
- No. of seasons: 1
- No. of episodes: 65

Production
- Executive producers: Lee Gunther; Margaret Loesch; Bruce L. Paisner
- Producers: John Ahern; Rick Hoberg; Bill Hutten; Glenn Johnson; Tony Love; Don Sheppard; Lee Orgel; George Singer; Bill Hutton; Tony Love
- Running time: 30 minutes
- Production companies: Marvel Productions; King Features Entertainment

Original release
- Network: Syndication
- Release: September 8 – December 5, 1986

Defenders of the Earth is an American animated television series produced in 1986, featuring characters from three comic strips distributed by King Features Syndicate—Flash Gordon, The Phantom, Mandrake the Magician, and Mandrake's assistant Lothar—opposing Ming the Merciless in the year 2015. Supporting characters include their children Rick Gordon (son of Flash), L.J. (son of Lothar), Kshin (adopted son of Mandrake), and Jedda Walker (daughter of the Phantom).

The series lasted for 65 episodes; there was also a short-lived comic book series published by Star Comics (an imprint of Marvel Comics). The closing credits credit Rob Walsh and Tony Pastor for the main title music, and Stan Lee for the lyrics. The series later aired in reruns on the Sci Fi Channel as part of its animation block, Cartoon Quest.

== Premise ==
Flash Gordon and his son Rick escape from Ming the Merciless, who has exhausted the natural resources of his home planet Mongo and desires to exploit Earth. Ming tries to brainwash Flash's wife Dale Arden, but she resists until death, whereafter her psyche is later included in the Defenders' supercomputer Dynac X. To protect Earth from Ming's invasion, among other threats, Flash joins forces with Mandrake, his assistant Lothar and The Phantom, alongside their children, to form the Defenders.

== Characters ==
=== Protagonists ===

- Flash Gordon (voiced by Lou Richards) — Leader of the Defenders of the Earth: a space pilot and the father of Rick Gordon. In the Audiobooks he is voiced by Pat Fraley.
- The Phantom (voiced by Peter Mark Richman) — Essentially identical to Lee Falk's character, but differing from the original in that by chanting "By jungle law, the Ghost Who Walks calls forth the power of ten tigers", he momentarily receives superhuman strength. His real name is Kit Walker. His horse Hero and wolf Devil make brief appearances. The end credits describe this Phantom by saying "This is the 27th Phantom".
- Mandrake the Magician (voiced by Peter Renaday) — A hypnotist and mystic capable of manipulating others' perceptions almost at will. He is often portrayed as a secondary leader of the Defenders, and sometimes the narrator of their decisions.
- Lothar (voiced by Buster Jones) — Mandrake's assistant and bodyguard, depicted as a powerful fighter, an able mechanic, and a master tactician. The action figure's packaging describes Lothar as a "Caribbean ninja". In the Audiobook he is voiced by Pat Fraley
- Richard "Rick" Gordon (voiced by Loren Lester) — Richard is an impulsive computer genius and the son of Flash Gordon. Rick, along with many of the other teenagers of the show, attended Central High located in Central City. Rick Gordon was initially intended to be Kit Walker, the son of the Phantom. In the Audiobooks he is voiced by Cam Clarke.
- L.J. (voiced by Dion Williams) — Short for 'Lothar Jr.', L.J. is the street-wise martial arts expert son of Lothar, and Rick's best friend. When in one episode, the Defenders locate a crystal which shows them their greatest desires, L.J.'s is to defeat the antagonist Octon.
- Jedda Walker (voiced by Sarah Partridge) — Jedda is the daughter of the Phantom and displays telepathy and limited extrasensory powers, usually expressed by communication with her black panther Kisa. There is little-or-no mention of her mother, though in one episode she is the reluctant stepdaughter of Queen Hadea. Some installments imply a relationship with Rick Gordon. Jedda Walker was initially intended to be Jedda Gordon, daughter of Flash Gordon. In one episode, Jedda briefly takes on her father's mantle when he is presumed dead. In most iteration's of the Phantom's story, the mantle is passed strictly from father to son.
- Kshin (voiced by Adam Carl) — Kshin is an orphaned boy adopted by Mandrake and trained as his apprentice. His origins are revealed in the late season episode "The adoption of Kshin", where it is shown he was a young street orphan found by Mandrake after a gang of boys tried using him as a distraction in a failed pick-pocketing attempt. He is usually accompanied by the extraterrestrial "Zuffy", initially found by Rick Gordon on the planet Mongo.
- Dynac X (voiced by Diane Pershing) — Dynac X is the central computer of the Defenders' Headquarters, whose operating system is stated to contain the psyche of Flash Gordon's wife. Though she is never addressed by name in the series, the comic book adaptation of the first two episodes identifies the slain "Mrs. Gordon" as Dale Arden. Diane Pershing is the only performer from the Filmation cartoon who reprised her role.

=== Antagonists ===
- Ming the Merciless (voiced by Ron Feinberg) — A warlord or supervillain bent on exploiting Earth's natural resources, based on 'Ice Station Earth'. This version is made more grotesque than his traditional appearance to avoid racial stereotyping; a similar treatment would be used on the Mandarin in the Iron Man animated series and on Dr. No in James Bond Jr., in that all three characters received green skin and pointed ears; this would also be done to Ming and his daughter Aura as shown on the 1996-1997 Flash Gordon TV series.
  - Prince Kro-Tan (voiced by Hal Rayle) — Ming the Merciless' son
  - Princess Castra (voiced by Jennifer Darling) — Ming the Merciless' daughter
  - Octon (voiced by William Callaway) — an octopus-like artificial intelligence, equivalent to an 'evil version' of Dynac X, which advises Ming the Merciless of methods to conquer the Earth or defeat the Defenders. His name is derived from that of an opponent of Mandrake's in the latter's eponymous comic strip, wherein it identifies a crime lord also known as the Cobra.
  - Garax (voiced by William Callaway) — the leader of Ming's mechanical soldiers, the Ice Robots. He is the only one of these to recur, and the only one given any distinction from the others, who are frequently slain en masse by the Defenders.
  - Mongor — a giant serpent-like pet of Ming the Merciless
- Kurt Walker (voiced by William Callaway) — Aliased "N'Dama the Weather Demon", Kurt is the older brother of the Phantom. When competing in a trial with Kit for the right to become the next Phantom, Kurt won but was passed-over in favor of Kit due his father knowing that he had lied and cheated, as well as abandoning his brother after causing a rock fall that had injured him. This results in him being disinherited by their father, and the contempt he has for Kit. Kurt is specifically created for the series and has never appeared elsewhere.
- The Sky Band — A coalition of raiders depicted in the Phantom comics; here depicted as space-pirates.
- Queen Hadea — Ruler of the subterranean "Netherworld", where she is the latest in a dynasty of monarchs served by pale, deformed humanoids. In her first appearance, Hadea desires to take the Phantom as a consort. After later offering to heal the injured Jedda Walker, she displays a brief interest in assuming a maternal role in the girl's life. Her great ambition is to capture the powerful Necklace of Oros, which confers control of others in the user's presence.
- Graviton — The original owner of the Necklace of Oros, and implied to have dwelt among the Moai of Rapa Nui, Graviton is an extradimensional being of unknown origins, who seeks to recover the Necklace from Earth and establish himself as a dictator.

== Production ==
Marvel Productions and King Features Syndicate worked together to develop the show. Marvel Productions had brought in consulting company Q5 Corporation to help develop the show. Q5's consultants consist of psychology PhDs and advertising, marketing and research professionals. The animation for the series were done overseas at Daewon Media and Sei Young Animation in Seoul, South Korea, and Toei Animation in Tokyo, Japan, and Burbank Animation in Philippine.

== Episodes ==
No.	Title	Written by	Original release date
1	"Escape from Mongo"	Dick Robbins and Bryce Malek	September 8, 1986
The life force of Dale Arden-Gordon, Flash's wife, is drained in Ming's evil Inquisitor...but not before her essence is saved for son Rick Gordon's nearly-completed super-computer, Dynak X. In the first battle against Ming for Earth, our heroes are nearly electrocuted in an abandoned penitentiary.
2	"The Creation of Monitor"	Mel Gilden	September 9, 1986
A huge cavern, located in a dormant volcano, is chosen as the HQ for the Defenders of the Earth...and for their super-computer, Dynak X.
3	"A Demon in His Pocket"	Chuck Lorre	September 10, 1986
When Kshin experiments with Mandrake's forbidden sorcery books, he accidentally summons the demon Shogoth. It takes the Defenders' combined efforts and talents to defeat this hellish creature. In the process, Kshin learns a valuable lesson about what it takes to Defend the Earth.
4	"A House Divided"	Jimmy Griffin and Dave Weathers	September 11, 1986
Kurt Walker, Kit's older brother, would have been the Phantom had he lived up to the Phantom name; but Kurt had an evil streak in him. So instead, Kit was made the Phantom by his father. Ming the Merciless transforms the vengeful Kurt into N'Dama, the Weather Demon. N'Dama wreaks havoc on the Bandar, the Phantom's people, in order to flush out his brother Kit and niece Jedda. Once this is done, N'Dama challenges the Phantom to a race for the Jewel of Zandoon; such recreates the test the Walker boys' father, the 26th Phantom, had used to determine who was worthy of being the next Phantom. This time, however, N'Dama (Kurt) stops at nothing to best his brother.
5	"Bits 'n' Chips"	Mark Zaslove, Dick Robbins, and Bryce Malek	September 12, 1986
When Dynak X is invaded by Ming's Electronic Maggot, the Defenders must miniaturize themselves (a la Fantastic Voyage) in order to cure her from within.
6	"The Root of Evil"	Ken Cinnamon and Karen Wengrod	September 15, 1986
A famous scientist's plant food-experiment backfires...creating a formula which turns people into plants.
7	"Cold War"	Anthony Zalewski	September 16, 1986
Ming develops a weather control-device and threatens to freeze the world solid...unless its population accepts him as their ruler.
8	"The Sleeper Awakes"	Arthur Byron Cover	September 17, 1986
A mammoth killer-robot from another galaxy has been buried under Central City for ten million years. Now Ming discovers a way to wake it up.
9	"The Revenge of Astra"	Creighton Barnes	September 18, 1986
The beautiful Princess Astra, who has a grudge against Flash Gordon, gives Ming the secret formula she has developed...one which will supply Mongo's Emperor with a race of unstoppable slaves, the Clay People.
10	"The Hall of Wisdom"	Larry Parr and Gar Haywood	September 19, 1986
The Defenders must prevent Ming from exploiting an awesome travelling storehouse of intergalactic knowledge.
11	"The Mind Warriors, Part 1"	Evelyn A.R. Gabai	September 22, 1986
Ming commandeers the Defenders' own Battle Simulator, and traps our heroes within.
12	"The Mind Warriors, Part 2"	Evelyn A.R. Gabai	September 23, 1986
Ming utilizes the Star of Mongo, a powerful crystal which taps Kshin's own fertile imagination to create evil counterparts of the Defenders.
13	"The Lost Jewels of Tibet"	Arthur Byron Cover	September 24, 1986
After joining forces with the beautiful Atascadero for a treasure hunt, Mandrake and Lothar must face the wrath of a vengeful dragon. This may force them to do the unthinkable: team up with Ming for survival.
14	"The Evil of Doctor Dark"	Alfred A. Pegal	September 25, 1986
Ming teams up with Mandrake's old nemesis Dr. Dark (a former member of the Shadow Lords) to locate the three-part Orb of Konos which can make its user immortal.
15	"Diamonds Are a Ming's Best Friend"	Mel Gilden	September 26, 1986
Ming seeks the Crown Jewels of England to upgrade his Ice Robots into Crystal ones.
16	"The Men of Frost"	Kathryn M. Drennan	September 29, 1986
Ming launches a Frost Satellite and threatens to plunge Earth into another Ice Age.
17	"Battleground"	Doug Smith	September 30, 1986
Ming uses a freeze-ray to capture extraterrestrials, which he then transports to earth and unleashes on humanity.
18	"The Panther Peril"	Paul Davids	October 1, 1986
Ming treks to the hidden Temple of Pantheria and acquires the sacred Panther Tooth, which he will use to wreak havoc on the world.
19	"Fury of the Deep"	David Wise	October 2, 1986
Ming schemes to take over mankind by exploiting an oceanographer's latest invention.
20	"Family Reunion"	Jimmy Griffin and Dave Weathers	October 3, 1986
In exchange for her father's life, Jedda agrees to become the protege of her evil uncle Kurt Walker.
21	"The Defense Never Rests"	Francis Moss	October 6, 1986
Ming develops a team of android clones, which he uses to frame the Defenders for a recent crime spree...thus getting our heroes banished to another galaxy.
22	"Like Father, Like Daughter"	Francis Moss	October 7, 1986
Ming plots to enslave the human race using his new Mind Neutralizer. He also uses his own daughter, Princess Aura, as bait in a trap for the Defenders' offspring.
23	"The Would-Be Defender"	Evelyn A.R. Gabai	October 8, 1986
When an overzealous 13-year-old superhero-wannabe spends a day at Monitor, it could mean an end to the world as we know it.
24	"Doorways into Darkness"	John Shirley	October 9, 1986
Ming taps into the Nightworld and unleashes its monstrous denizens against the Earth.
25	"Deal with the Devil"	Jim Barmierer and Bob Rosenfarb	October 10, 1986
Octon and Garax lure the young Defenders to Ming's polar headquarters. There Ming probes Rick's mind for the means to negotiate Monitor's defense systems.
26	"Terror in Time"	Bill DuBay	October 13, 1986
Ming unleashes a parasitic mutant on the Defenders, warping them into the distant past. Prince Valiant guest-stars.
27	"Ming's Household Helpers"	David Schwartz	October 14, 1986
"Household Helper" robots are selling like hotcakes. Unbeknownst to the public, the manufacturer is none other than Ming...who plans to enslave the HH buyers via satellite-directed hypno-beam.
28	"The Starboy"	David Wise	October 15, 1986
Ming finds competition when a seemingly-harmless child crash-lands on Earth...followed by an extraterrestrial armada bent on destroying him, along with whoever and whatever stands in the way.
29	"The Gods Awake"	David Wise	October 16, 1986
Aided by a powerful mystic, Ming taps into another dimension for help conquering the world; however, he underestimates his godlike collaborator.
30	"The Ghost Walks Again"	David Wise	October 17, 1986
When Kit Walker perishes in the line of duty (or does he?), a grieving Jedda embraces her destiny as the 28th Phantom.
31	"The Book of Mysteries"	David Wise	October 20, 1986
Part 1 of 5. When the Defenders face certain death inside an ancient Moroccan shrine, it's up to Kshin - wielding a mysterious book of enigmas - to save them.
32	"The Future Comes But Once"	Rick Merwin	October 21, 1986
Part 2 of 5. The Defenders must prevent Ming from obtaining an obelisk which will empower its owner to travel 4 times the speed of light.
33	"Kshin and the Ghost Ship"	Richard Merwin	October 22, 1986
Part 3 of 5.
34	"The Carnival of Doctor Kalihari"	Allan Cole and Chris Bunch	October 23, 1986
Part 4 of 5. On a family outing to a traveling carnival, the senior Defenders become part of the freak show...when they shrink to action figure-size.
35	"The Mystery of the Book"	David Wise	October 24, 1986
Part 5 of 5. It's up to Kshin, guided by the book Enigma, to save his fellow Defenders from a monster (not Ming this time!) who's out to rule the Earth...or destroy it.
36	"Flash Times Four"	Chris Bunch and Allan Cole	October 27, 1986
Ming clones Flash, whom he puts under the Inquisitor...hoping to replicate our hero's legendary dogfighting prowess.
37	"The Frozen Heart"	Chuck Lorre	October 28, 1986
LJ learns to treat women as people, rather than objects...when Ming turns the young Defender's girlfriend into one of his evil Frost Warriors, whom our heroes are then forced to battle.
38	"Rick Gordon, One-Man Army"	Francis Moss	October 29, 1986
Rick and Company must save a tropical island from revolutionary forces who've signed a pact with Ming.
39	"The Rites of Zesnan"	Kevin Rock	October 30, 1986
Rick, LJ, and Jedda must pool their wits and resources to save their fathers from certain doom.
40	"Audie and Tweak"	David Wise	October 31, 1986
Octon enables Ming to demobilize the world through its own computer-network.
41	"Return of the Skyband"	David Wise	November 3, 1986
Female pirates, who also happen to be longtime nemeses of the Phantom, terrorize the world from above.
42	"Dracula's Potion"	Chris Bunch and Allan Cole	November 4, 1986
In Transylvania, the Defenders' efforts to solve a mysterious disappearance are complicated...when they're pitted against Bram Stoker's notorious Vampire-Prince.
43	"One of the Guys"	Chuck Lorre	November 5, 1986
A paralyzed Kshin teams up with a handicapped classmate to thwart Ming's latest scheme.
44	"100 Proof Highway"	Chris Bunch and Allan Cole	November 6, 1986
A friend's heavy drinking lands both him and Jedda in mortal peril.
45	"The Time Freezer"	Paul Davids	November 7, 1986
The Defenders must prevent an extraterrestrial (not Ming this time!) from stealing a fortune in gold and jewels.
46	"The Prince Makes His Move"	Dick Robbins and Bryce Malek	November 10, 1986
Part 1 of 5. Prince Krotan of Mongo challenges both his father Ming and the Defenders in a rush for world domination.
47	"The Prince Triumphant"	David Wise	November 11, 1986
Part 2 of 5. Ming's son, Prince Krotan, plots to harness the power of Earth's core...thus making it a neighbor-planet of Mongo.
48	"The Prince Weds"	David Wise	November 12, 1986
Part 3 of 5. Krotan seeks an unwilling Jedda as his bride.
49	"The Prince's Royal Hunt"	David Wise	November 13, 1986
Part 4 of 5. Krotan poaches the Defenders like animals, after transporting each of them to a different sector of Mongo.
50	"The Prince Dethroned"	David Wise	November 14, 1986
Part 5 of 5. Krotan unleashes a sinister deity, who he foolishly attempts to exploit.
51	"Lothar's Homecoming"	Francis Moss	November 17, 1986
Amid a ceremony in Lothar's honor, the Defenders must prevent a Jamaican cult from seizing power via control of the local children.
52	"Suspended Sabotage"	Kevin Rock	November 18, 1986
While holding Rick hostage, Ming blackmails L.J. into betraying the Defenders.
53	"The Call of the Eternals"	Gar Haywood	November 19, 1986
The Defenders are pitted against the Beacon of the Eternals, who have sent a trio of warrior-robots to overthrow Earth.
54	"The Return of Doctor Dark"	Reed Robbins	November 20, 1986
Dr. Dark plans to take control of the world, by assembling and exploiting the Orb of Konos.
55	"The Deadliest Battle"	Chuck Lorre	November 21, 1986
While Rick learns about drugs the hard way, Ming copes with addiction of a different color.
56	"The Necklace of Oros"	Mark Zaslove and Mark Edens	November 24, 1986
Part 1 of 5. A deadly extraterrestrial who can manipulate gravity signs a pact with Ming...in exchange for Jedda, plus a mysterious artifact.
57	"Torn Space"	Mark Zaslove and Mark Edens	November 25, 1986
Part 2 of 5. The evil Graviton again challenges Jedda for the powerful Necklace of Oros.
58	"Ming Winter"	Mark Zaslove and Mark Edens	November 26, 1986
Part 3 of 5. Prince Krotan, Ming's treacherous son, makes another effort to seize control of Earth...this time by plunging the world into a second Ice Age via an artificial eclipse.
59	"The Golden Queen"	Mark Zaslove and Mark Edens	November 27, 1986
Part 4 of 5. Jedda is caught between a rock and a hard place, when she must protect the Necklace of Oros from not one but two would-be-dictators waging interdimensional warfare.
60	"The Gravity of Ming"	Mark Zaslove and Mark Edens	November 28, 1986
Part 5 of 5. Graviton and Hadea team up with Ming to battle the Defenders for world domination. However, in the face of their sinister natures, how long will this truce last?
61	"Flesh and Blood"	David Wise	December 1, 1986
The Defenders must sniff out a trio of deadly robots masquerading as humans.
62	"The Drowning World"	Chris Bunch and Allan Cole	December 2, 1986
Ming plans to melt Earth's polar icecaps, which will flood the continents.
63	"The Adoption of Kshin"	Bill DuBay	December 3, 1986
Kshin's wayward grandfather leads the Defenders on a search for the lost City of Dreams.
64	"Street Smarts"	Mel Gilden	December 4, 1986
LJ's fellow Defenders struggle to teach him that adults are as they do.
65	"Ming's Thunder Lizards"	Allan Cole and Chris Bunch	December 5, 1986
After releasing prehistoric creatures from cryogenic suspension, Ming uses them to wreak havoc across the Alaskan outback.

== Home releases ==
In 1987, select episodes of the show were released on four VHS cassettes by Family Home Entertainment in North America.

Roughly two decades after production was completed, the series was released around the world on DVD, featuring various episodes and packaging depending on region.

=== United States ===
On October 10, 2006 and April 3, 2007 the series were released to DVD by BCI Eclipse Entertainment LLC (under its Ink & Paint classic animation entertainment label) in Region 1, containing all 65 original broadcast episodes in two Complete Series volumes and presented in original storyline continuity order.

These release includes interviews with story editor Bryce Malek, writer David Wise, and artist Michael Swanigan—each of whom reflect on various points of the creative process, including the origins of the characters, legal issues surrounding the properties, controversial content, and ways in which the production differed from others of its time.

Mill Creek Entertainment re-released the complete series on DVD in Region 1 on May 18, 2010.

The series is streaming on Amazon Prime Video and Tubi TV.

=== Germany ===
NEW KSM FILM has released the series in Germany:

- Defenders of the Earth (Gesamtedition) [1-Blu-ray] – only German language – no extras
- Defenders of the Earth (Superbox) [4-disc set DVDs] – only German language – no extras
- Defenders of the Earth (Volume One) [6-disc set DVDs] – only German language – earlier release, no extras
- Defenders of the Earth (Volume Two) [6-disc set DVDS] – only German language – earlier release, no extras

=== Australia ===
Force Entertainment has released the series in Australia:

- Defenders of the Earth (6-disc set)
- Defenders of the Earth (8-disc set), disc 7 features the film "The Story Begins" and disc 8 the film "Prince Kro-Tan".

The first episode appears on the BCI Eclipse DVD releases for:

- Animated All-Stars collection
- The New Adventures of Flash Gordon: The Complete Series

BCI has also released two 5-Disc sets that cover the entire series:

- Defenders of the Earth—Complete Series Volume 1 (5-Discs) 33 Episodes
- Defenders of the Earth—Complete Series Volume 2 (5-Discs) 32 Episodes (April 3, 2007)

=== United Kingdom ===
Selected episodes are available in the UK, in compilations including:
Hollywood DVD LTD

- Defenders of the Earth—The Story Begins

Delta Music PLC

- Defenders of the Earth vol 1
- Defenders of the Earth vol 2
- Defenders of the Earth vol 3
  - The above volumes include three episodes each, covering the first eight episodes of the series and the series finale, "Ming's Thunder Lizards".
- Defenders of the Earth Movie — "The Book of Mysteries"
  - "The Book of Mysteries" combines episodes 31–35
- Defenders of the Earth Movie — "Prince Kro-Tan"
  - "Prince of Kro-Tan" combines episodes 46–50
- Defenders of the Earth Movie — "Necklace of Oros"
  - "Necklace of Oros" combines episodes 56–60

The complete series was then released in the UK by Fabulous Films and Fremantle Media on February 18, 2013.

=== Sweden ===
VHS-Select Video (7104/73) Ondskans Makt (1987) incl episodes - Ondskans Makt (?), Bröder (?), Dynak i Fara (?) - Only Swedish voice

== In other media ==
=== Comics ===
In 1987, Star Comics (Marvel Comics' children's imprint) published a comic book series which only lasted four issues. It was written by Stan Lee (#1) and Michael Higgins (#2–4) with art by Alex Saviuk. The last issue featured a "next issue" caption, but #5 was never published.

In 2013, Dynamite Comics published Kings Watch, a bi-monthly limited series written by Jeff Parker teaming the Phantom, Mandrake, Lothar, and Flash Gordon, taking on not just Ming, but characters from all over the King Features universe. The comic lasted five issues.

In 2024, Mad Cave Studios published a trade paperback of the Marvel series and launched a new series written by Dan DiDio with art by Jim Calafiore.

=== Books ===
There have been DOE-related books, including The Creation of Monitor, A House Divided, The Sun-Stealers and Computer Checkmate.

=== Action figures ===
A line of action figures produced by Galoob included Flash Gordon, Mandrake, Lothar, the Phantom, Ming, and Garax. As part of the show's 35th anniversary, National Entertainment Collectibles Association (NECA) produced variants of its King Features characters in the style and colors of the Defenders of the Earth.

=== Video games ===
A video game was released by Enigma Variations Software in 1990, for the Amiga, Atari ST, Commodore 64, Amstrad CPC, SAM Coupé and ZX Spectrum systems. It is a side-scrolling action game featuring the heroes Flash Gordon, Lothar, the Phantom and Mandrake from the series on a quest to rescue their children, who have been kidnapped by Ming. The player controls Flash, and is able to call on the other characters to assist him in bypassing the defences of Ming's castle.

== Parodies ==
- A parody, called Protectors of the Earth, is made up of comic strip characters Dr. Rex Morgan, Mary Worth, Garfield and Mark Trail.
- Robot Chicken produced a sketch where Flash Gordon, Mandrake and the Phantom operated as part of a Neighborhood Watch.
