= Lucas Richman =

American composer and conductor (born 1964)

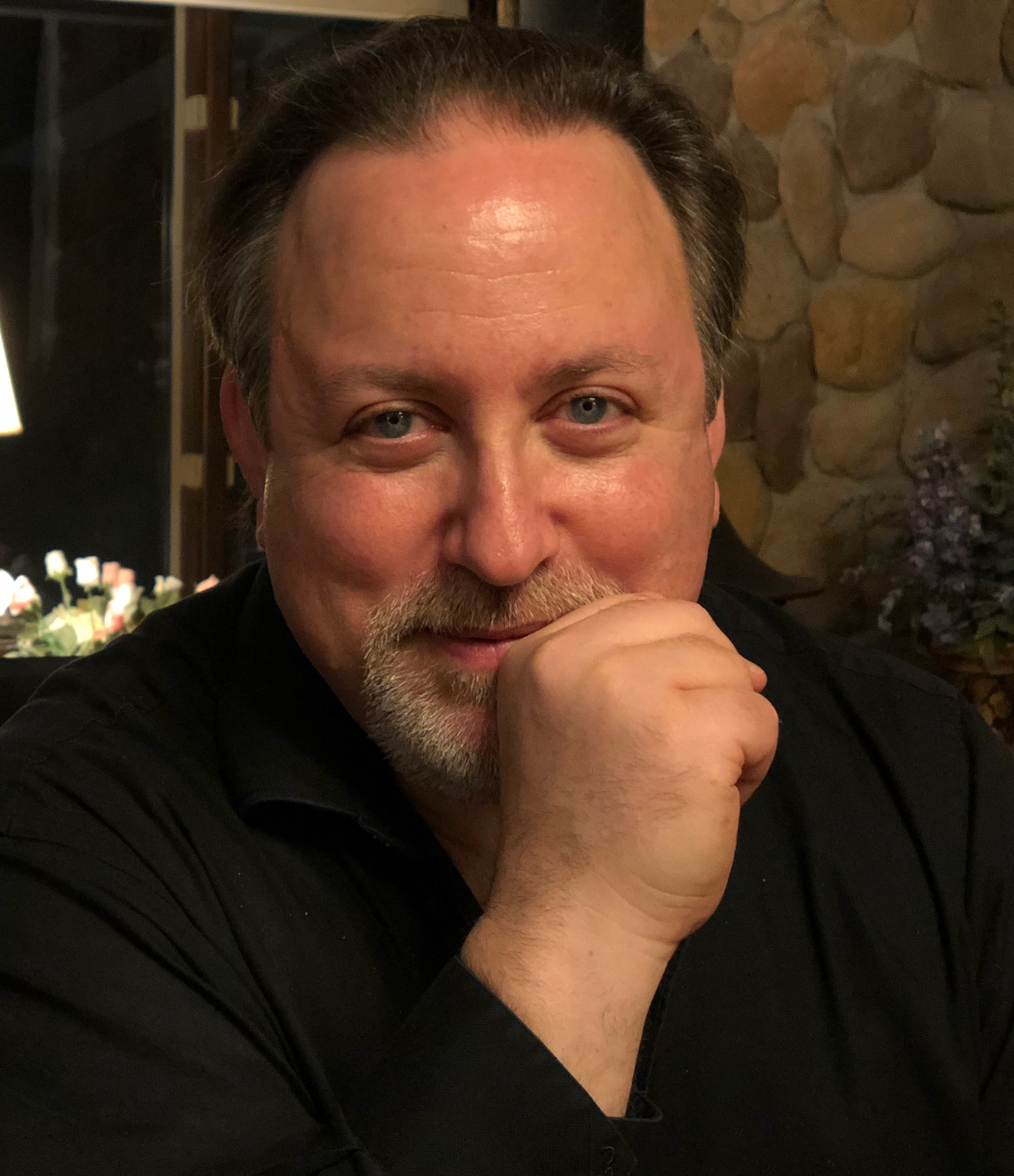
Richman in 2018

Lucas Richman (born January 31, 1964) is an American composer and conductor. He has conducted several film score soundtracks, including: As Good as It Gets, Se7en, The Manchurian Candidate, and The Village. In addition to his recording and film work, Richman has been serving, since 2010, as the music director of the Bangor Symphony Orchestra in Bangor, Maine. His niece is actress Julia Lester.

== Life and career ==
Richman is the son of American actors Peter Mark Richman and Helen (Landess) Richman. He received his master of music degree in conducting from the University of Southern California. Richman earned a Dramalogue Award for conducting Leonard Bernstein’s Candide in 2005.

As conductor, Richman was music director for the Knoxville Symphony Orchestra from 2003 to 2015. Richman has been current music director for the Bangor Symphony Orchestra since 2010.

In 2011, Richman and his collaborators on the Christopher Tin album Calling All Dawns received the Grammy Award for Best Classical Crossover Album, with Richman conducting the Royal Philharmonic Orchestra.

As composer, Richman premiered his work "Behold the Bold Umbrellaphant" with the San Diego Symphony, with poetry by Jack Prelutsky. The Pittsburgh Symphony Orchestra commissioned Richman to write his "Concerto for Oboe", which premiered in October 2013. The Symphony recorded the work with principal oboist Cynthia DeAlmeida in 2015.

Richman composed and arranged a collection of traditional and original lullabies for children entitled: Day Is Done.

On March 30, 2019 the Oak Ridge Symphony Orchestra & Chorus performed the world premiere of Richman's Symphony: This Will Be Our Reply for orchestra and chorus. The work was inspired by the quote: "This will be our reply to violence" by composer Leonard Bernstein.

On July 4, 2024, Richman was selected as an honored artist of the American Prize.

Richman was commissioned to compose a chamber opera entitled Blood & Breath, which premiered on October 19, 2024 at the Vatican in Rome.

== Filmography ==
Year	Film title	Role	Notes
1992	Mindwarp	Conductor	
1995	Se7en	Conductor (score)	
1996	The Twilights of the Golds	Opera Music Director	
1997	Face/Off	Conductor/Orchestrator	
1997	Anastasia	Conductor (songs)	
1997	The Borrowers	Orchestrator	
1997	As Good as It Gets	Music Conductor	
2004	The Manchurian Candidate	Conductor	
2004	The Village	Conductor	The film was nominated for an Academy Award for Best Original Score, but lost to Finding Neverland
2008	Kit Kittredge: An American Girl	Conductor	
2009	A Dog Year	Conductor	
2013	Behind the Candelabra	Conductor (score)	TV movie
2017	The Good Place	Conductor	TV series
2018	The House with a Clock in Its Walls	Conductor	
