= The Crimebusters =

1962 film by Boris Sagal

- Directed by: Boris Sagal
- Screenplay by: Paul Monash; Wallace Ware
- Starring: Mark Richman; Martin Gabel
- Cinematography: William W. Spencer
- Edited by: John Dahlgren; Ira Heymann; John Sheets
- Music by: Jerry Goldsmith
- Distributed by: Metro-Goldwyn-Mayer
- Release date: May 19, 1962
- Running time: 88 minutes
- Country: United States
- Language: English

The Crimebusters is a 1961 film directed by Boris Sagal. It stars Mark Richman and Martin Gabel. The film was composed of episodes of the American television series Cain's Hundred.

== Cast ==
- Mark Richman as Nicholas Cain
- Martin Gabel as George Vincent
- Phillip Pine as Phil Krajac
- Carol Eve Rossen as Stella
- Gavin MacLeod as Harry Deiner
- Bruce Dern as Joe Krajac

== See also ==
- List of American films of 1961
