= Batman and Harley Quinn =

2017 film directed by Sam Liu

- Theatrical release poster
- Directed by: Sam Liu
- Screenplay by: Bruce Timm; Jim Krieg
- Story by: Bruce Timm
- Based on: Batman by Bill Finger and Bob Kane Harley Quinn by Paul Dini and Bruce Timm
- Starring: Kevin Conroy; Melissa Rauch
- Edited by: Christopher D. Lozinski
- Music by: Michael McCuistion; Lolita Ritmanis; Kristopher Carter
- Production companies: Warner Bros. Animation; DC Entertainment; DR Movie (Animation services)
- Distributed by: Warner Bros. Home Entertainment
- Release dates: July 21, 2017 (San Diego Comic-Con); August 14, 2017
- Running time: 74 minutes
- Country: United States
- Language: English
- Box office: $6,448

Batman and Harley Quinn is a 2017 American animated superhero film produced by Warner Bros. Animation and distributed by Warner Bros. Home Entertainment. Directed by Sam Liu and written by Jim Krieg and Bruce Timm, it is the 30th film of the DC Universe Animated Original Movies, and also a successor to the TV shows Batman: The Animated Series and The New Batman Adventures. It premiered on July 21, 2017, at San Diego Comic-Con and was released into participating theaters for one night only on August 14. The film was released on digital on August 15, and on DVD and Blu-ray on August 29.

== Plot ==
Batman and Nightwing discover that Poison Ivy and Floronic Man have teamed up and stolen information from S.T.A.R. Labs about "Bio-Restorative Project" and Swamp Thing. Much to their reluctance, they decide to look for Harley Quinn to find out where the duo is hiding. However, Harley has gone off the grid since getting paroled. Batman leaves finding Harley to Nightwing while he figures out what the criminal duo are up to.

At A.R.G.U.S. Headquarters, Batman asks Sarge Steel about the kidnapping of a scientist named Dr. Harold Goldblum who has a background in chemistry, botany, and biological warfare. However, Sarge says they do not have any viable leads.

Nightwing finds Harley working as a waitress at the Superbabes restaurant where waitresses are dressed as superheroes and supervillains. Tailing her, Nightwing asks where he can find Ivy and Harley says she is done with superheroes and supervillains and wants to live a normal life. Nightwing asks her why she is in skimpy outfits for minimum wage instead of using her psychiatric training. He angers her saying she has not reported to her parole officer in months and that he could drag her to jail. They fight until she knocks him out with a weak dose of Joker Gas.

Meanwhile, Sarge shows Batman the home of Goldblum where he was kidnapped and Batman finds evidence that Floronic Man had been there.

Nightwing wakes up and finds he has been tied to a bed. Harley shows him a pile of rejection letters and that her criminal past prevents her from getting rehired as a psychiatrist. Eventually, the two sleep together.

Ivy is kissing Goldblum every six hours to control him with her pheromones. The criminal duo complain about humanity's negative environmental impact and Floronic Man says once their virus is activated every person on the planet "will have a vested interest in going green".

Nightwing and Harley are tickling each other until Batman walks in on them with the result being that Harley decides to help. Batman has concluded the criminal duo are using Goldblum to replicate the process that turned Holland into Swamp Thing, but a virus version that will turn everyone into plant hybrids.

Harley leads them to a popular hangout for henchmen. She gets the location of Ivy from her old minions Shrubby after having to perform Blondie's "Hanging on the Telephone". Then they had to fight their way past the henchmen on their way out.

The trio head to Blüdhaven where Ivy is saddened to see her friend helping Batman. Woodrue fatally wounds Goldblum to keep him quiet before he and Ivy escape as their lab catches fire. However, the dying Goldblum reveals that the duo is heading to Wainwright Swamp in Louisiana where the correct chemicals are.

Contacting A.R.G.U.S., Batman, Nightwing, and Harley head after them to convince Ivy to stop her mad plans since they have the potential to kill all life on Earth. Harley resorts to crying to convince Ivy who is finally swayed by their relationship. Swamp Thing appears, informing Woodrue that he would threaten the Green with his concoction. However, he will not interfere. Batman and Nightwing wonder how to stop Woodrue until Harley points out he is a plant and asks if they have a match. Grateful, they both kiss her on the cheek and Batman sets Woodrue on fire.

In a post-credits scene, Harleen Quinzel now has a reality television game show called "Ask Dr. Quinzel" where contestants run an elaborate obstacle course to win a year of professional therapy.

== Voice cast ==
- Kevin Conroy as Batman / Bruce Wayne
- Melissa Rauch as Harley Quinn / Dr. Harleen Quinzel
- Loren Lester as Nightwing / Dick Grayson
- Paget Brewster as Poison Ivy / Pamela Isley
- Kevin Michael Richardson as Floronic Man / Jason Woodrue
- John DiMaggio as Sarge Steel, Swamp Thing / Alec Holland (uncredited)
- Eric Bauza as Wesley
- Robin Atkin Downes as Charles "Rhino" Daly
- Trevor Devall as Bobby Liebowitz
- Rob Paulsen as Dr. Harold Goldblum, Min and Max (uncredited), Anderson (uncredited)
- Mindy Sterling as Project Supervisor
- Bruce Timm as Booster Gold / Michael J. Carter

== Production ==
The director is Sam Liu, who has directed prior DC animated films. The film is an original story written by Bruce Timm partnered with Jim Krieg. Kevin Conroy voices Batman and Loren Lester voices Nightwing, both of whom voiced those same roles in Batman: The Animated Series and in The New Batman Adventures. It is designed in the classic style similar to The New Batman Adventures, with Bruce Timm stating that the film is essentially a "48 Hrs."-style antics version of Batman and Harley Quinn teaming up. Notably, the film is much more comedic than the original series, with co-writer Jim Krieg stating "This is kind of a strange, red-headed nephew of Batman: The Animated Series, but don't show it to your kids thinking that it's Batman: The Animated Series, it is its own thing, kind of extrapolated."

The score was composed by Michael McCuistion, Kristopher Carter and Lolita Ritmanis, which was released on CD by WaterTower Records as an exclusive with FYE.

The animation was outsourced to DR Movie in South Korea.

== Tie-in media ==
On July 31, a five-issue prequel miniseries called Harley Quinn and Batman was released on a bi-weekly basis via digital download. Written by Ty Templeton and drawn by Rick Burchett, the plot follows Harley as she looks to separate herself from the Joker and become a full-fledged supervillain in her own right. Afterwards, a seven-issue miniseries (which shares the same title as the film) was released on a weekly basis (also via digital download) starting on October 23. This serves as an anthology series that takes place after the events of the film and was worked on by various writers. Both miniseries were collected into a trade paperback which was released on March 7, 2019.

=== Publications ===
- Batman and Harley Quinn (2018-03-07, hard cover, ISBN 1-4012-7957-0/978-1-4012-7957-8)
- Batman and Harley Quinn (2019-03-06, soft cover, ISBN 1-4012-8899-5/978-1-4012-8899-0)

== Release ==
Due to the financial success of The Killing Joke, the film was released in theaters for one night only through Fathom Events in the United States on August 14, 2017. The next week, a combo set with a Blu-ray copy, a DVD copy, and a digital copy was released.

Batman and Harley Quinn's theatrical release grossed $32,671 in Australia and $6,420 in the Netherlands, bringing its international total to $39,091. The film earned $971,323 from domestic DVD sales and $1,182,647 from domestic Blu-ray sales, bringing its total domestic home video earnings to $2,153,970.

== Reception ==
The film received praise for some of the voice cast and throwbacks to past Batman media, but was criticized for its script, tone, and raunchy humor. On Rotten Tomatoes, the film has an approval rating of 50% based on 12 reviews, with an average rating of 5.8/10.

Collider criticized the film's inconsistent tone, as well as its lack of resolution. Tyler Smith of Battleship Pretension criticized the more explicit sexual elements, writing, "As Batman and Harley Quinn attempts to incorporate more explicit sexuality – what could be considered 'adult content' – into the story, the film takes on the tone of a couple of 13-year-olds constantly high-fiving each other as they take turns writing risqué Harley Quinn fan fiction. I'm not exactly sure what the filmmakers were trying to achieve by treating the audience to gratuitous upskirt shots of Harley, but it certainly wasn't an attempt to make her a more well-rounded character. In fact, it's actually pretty dehumanizing."

IGN's review of the film was more positive, citing the throwback elements, aesthetics and fight choreography, but commented that the film is "self-indulgent" in its humor and "unbalanced between comedy and drama".
