= Aaron Robinson (composer) =

American composer, conductor and musicologist

- Born: 1970 (age 55–56); Camden, Maine, U.S.
- Genres: Classical, jazz, ragtime, film, Broadway
- Occupations: Composer, conductor, author
- Instruments: Piano, organ
- Years active: 1986–present
- Label: Music at Immanuel
- Website: aaronrobinson.info

Aaron Robinson is an American composer, conductor, and musicologist. He is the author of Does God Sing? – A Musical Journey. He created the musical work Black Nativity – In Concert: A Gospel Celebration. He also served as conductor and musical director in the PBS documentary On This Island. In 2013, he was nominated for an Emmy Award for composing Maine Public Broadcasting Network's Maine Arts series theme music.

== Personal background ==
Robinson attended Medomak Valley High School in Waldoboro, Maine. At 16 years of age—a self-taught musician who never took piano lessons—he became the organist at both the Broad Cove Community Church in Cushing and the Friendship United Methodist Church. By his late teens, he was creating, performing and producing concerts and theatrical productions, including the musical Moody Blue for which he wrote both the music and lyrics. According to a 2013 interview, Robinson studied composition and piano performance at the Boston Conservatory of Music with composers John Adams and Larry Thomas Bell, as well as film scoring with John Williams at the Berklee School of Music; but chose not to graduate with a degree. Instead, he "went out and lived the life of music," as he said in a 2017 interview. In 2001, he became organist and choirmaster for "Music at Immanuel" at the Immanuel Baptist Church in Portland, Maine.

In 2009, Robinson retired from public performing due to illness. During which time Robinson wrote the memoir, Does God Sing – A Musical Journey. It reached No. 5 on the Barnes & Noble best-sellers non-fiction paperback list for March 2013.

Robinson lives on the coast of Maine.

== Career ==
Robinson has conducted works for the concert and theatrical stage, including Leonard Bernstein's Candide – The Concert Version. In 1997, Robinson conducted Treemonisha: The Concert Version by ragtime composer Scott Joplin at the Rockport Opera House in Rockport, Maine, with a new libretto by Judith Kurtz Bogdanove.

In 2001, he orchestrated, arranged, and conducted the musical Islands, which was produced on Broadway at the New Victory Theater by John Wulp, with music and lyrics by Cidny Bullens.

Robinson conducted the world premiere performance of his Black Nativity – In Concert: A Gospel Celebration in 2001 at the Immanuel Baptist Church. The concert version recreated the original performance of Langston Hughes's Gospel Song-Play Black Nativity that opened in 1961 at the 41st Street Theatre in New York City. In 2004, the documentary film Black Nativity – In Concert: A Gospel Celebration was made about the world premiere performance, production, and creation under the direction of Robinson with the original cast. In December 2013, Robinson collaborated with Dr. Anthony Antolini and the Bowdoin College Chorus and Down East Singers to mount a revised version of his 2004 creation.

Robinson composed An American Requiem, which had its New England Premiere under the direction of Dr. Robert Russell and the USM Chorale. He also wrote Driving Old Memories (The Rockland Maine Song) with his father Ervin Robinson. On June 2, 2021, the Mayor of Rockland, Maine presented a key to the city and proclaimed June 2021 "Driving Old Memories" month.

In 2012 he wrote the music for the independent documentary In the Shadows of Grey Gardens. The theme (Grey Gardens) of which was used as the soundtrack to New York Magazine's June 2025 Hampton Issue featuring Cole Escola as Little Edie Beale. In an article entitled "Robinson and Ragtime", David Welker called him "one of today’s leading proponents of early jazz and ragtime music". He is perhaps best known for his composition "The New England Ragtime Suite" for piano.

In 2014, the opening of Maine Public Broadcasting's "Maine Arts!" Series received an Emmy Award at the 36th annual New England Emmy Awards for which Robinson contributed the series’ theme music and was nominated for a separate Emmy Award. Robinson composed the Maine-based musical, The Legend of Jim Cullen – A Dramatic Musical, which received its world premiere at the Heartwood Regional Theater Company in the summer of 2014.

In May 2017, Robinson premiered two choral works in Studzinski Hall at Bowdoin College: "Requiem For a New World" and "This Will Be Our Reply To Violence" with words by Leonard Bernstein. With a famous line taken from an address Bernstein gave a few days after the assassination of President John F. Kennedy, according to a 2017 interview, it was the first time the Bernstein Estate had ever granted a composer the rights to set the words to music. It was performed later that year by the Vox Nova Chamber Choir. Robinson received acclaim for his compositions from Maine's Senators Angus King and Susan Collins, who remarked: "With the scourge of violence unabated in our times, we all must increase our devotion to the highest ideals of humanity. Through your remarkable career as a composer, performer, and author, you are helping to elevate our nation as you bring distinction to our great state of Maine.”

Robinson collaborated with children's book author and illustrator Ashley Bryan in 2018 on an African-American Requiem titled "A Tender Bridge". The work celebrates Bryan's life and career based on his writings; and uses "jazz, ragtime, Negro spirituals, Southern hymns and other musical idioms, along with a full choir, gospel choir, children’s choir, orchestra jazz ensemble and multiple narrators."

In 2019, Robinson founded and became Artistic Director for the "Glenn Jenks Ragtime Revue" in Camden, Maine; a 501(c)3 non-profit organization that celebrates the life and career of ragtime composer Glenn Jenks. The Ragtime Revue presents annual concerts in Revue-style settings, offering music, humor and dance centered around ragtime and early jazz with musicians from around the world. The proceeds benefit the "Glenn Jenks Future in Music Prize"; a scholarship promoting music through performance, education and scholarships to aspiring musicians.

As a music historian, Robinson has written for several publications and appeared on radio and television, including Portland Monthly Magazine, The Syncopated Times, NPR and Maine Public Radio, and WCSH television.

== Published works ==
- Robinson, Aaron (2013). Does God Sing?: A Musical Journey, Tate Publishing. 182 pages. ISBN 978-1621474630
- Langston, Hughes (1961) Aaron Robinson (2004). Black Nativity, Dramatic Publishing. 34 pages. ISBN 0871291924

== Filmography ==
=== Television ===
Year	Title	Role	Notes
2003	On This Island	Music Director (self)	PBS Documentary

=== Film ===
Year	Film title	Role	Notes
2004	Black Nativity: In Concert – A Gospel Celebration	Conductor (self)	Documentary
2009	Gamer	Musician	Music Department
2012	In The Shadows of Grey Gardens	Composer	Soundtrack
2014	The Truth About You	Composer	Soundtrack

== Compositions ==
- Russian Festival Overture - Orchestra (1987)
- March for Band (1988)
- 12 Original Rags - Piano(1989)
- Moody Blue – The Musical (1990)
- The Tell-Tale Heart - Narrator and Piano (1990)
- The New England Ragtime Suite - Piano (1993)
- Peter and Wendy – A Fantasy Ballet (1994)
- The Amazing Bone - Narrator and Orchestra (1995)
- An American Requiem - Soloists, Chorus and Orchestra (1997)
- Willy Wonka and the Chocolate Factory – The Musical (1998)
- Islands - The Musical (2001)
- Black Nativity: In Concert – A Gospel Celebration - Chorus, Soloists, Piano and B-3 Hammond Organ (2004)
- Ballads of the Old West - Song Cycle, voice and piano (2007) text by Lois Wright
- In the Shadows of Grey Gardens - Film Score (2009)
- La Belle Epoque - (12 pieces) piano (2011)
- Maine Arts! - Emmy Nominated TV Theme (2014)
- Sonatina for Bassoon and Piano (2013)
- The Truth About You, Film Score (2014)
- Petite Suite - Bassoon trio (2014)
- The Legend of Jim Cullen – A Musical (2014)
- I Paint What I See - Voice and Piano (2014) text by E.B. White
- This Will Be Our Reply To Violence – Chorus (2017) text by Leonard Bernstein
- Words & Music – A Musical Revue (2017)
- A Tender Bridge – Narrators, Soloists, Chorus, Jazz Ensemble and Orchestra (2018)
- Suite for Band (2019)
- Variations on a Theme by Handel - Piano (2019)
- Le Carnaval Des Enfants (The Children's Carnival) - Suite for Piano (2020)
- Piano Sonata No. 1 (2021)
- Faust in the Anthropocene - Incidental Music (2025)
- Nothing Gold Can Stay - Song Set (2026)

== Discography ==
Year	Album title	Performers	Record label
1998	Treemonisha – In Concert	Aaron Robinson, Various	Take-a-Bough Productions
2004	Black Nativity – In Concert: A Gospel Celebration	Aaron Robinson, Paul Havenstein II, Various	Music at Immanuel
2008	Symphonic Dances	Aaron Robinson, organ	Music at Immanuel
2011	La Belle Epoque	Aaron Robinson, piano	Music at Immanuel
2011	They All Played Ragtime (re-release)	Aaron Robinson, piano	Music at Immanuel
2014	Works For Harpsichord: JS Bach & GF Handel	Aaron Robinson, harpsichord	Music at Immanuel
2014	The Legend of Jim Cullen – A Dramatic Musical	The Legend of Jim Cullen Cast Ensemble	MAI
2015	Max Morath – Complete Ragtime Works for Piano	Aaron Robinson, piano	MAI

== Awards and nominations ==
Year	Association	Award category	Result
2013	Emmy Award	Musical Composition Opening	Nominated
