= After the Wizard =

- DVD cover
- Directed by: Hugh Gross
- Written by: Hugh Gross
- Produced by: Lance Frank; Blake Phillips
- Starring: Orien Richman; Jermel Nakia; Helen Richman; Loren Lester; Peter Mark Richman
- Cinematography: Dana Rice
- Edited by: Dana Rice
- Music by: Stephen Main
- Production company: Private Lenders Group
- Distributed by: Breaking Glass Pictures
- Release date: July 2, 2011
- Running time: 80 minutes
- Country: United States
- Language: English

After the Wizard is an independent 2011 fantasy film written and directed by Hugh Gross, based on the 1900 novel The Wonderful Wizard of Oz by L. Frank Baum. The film premiered in 2011 in Kingman, Kansas. The DVD, distributed by Breaking Glass Pictures, was released on August 7, 2012.

== Premise ==
A 12-year-old Kansas orphan turns to the Scarecrow and the Tin Woodman for help during a difficult time. She imagines that things have not gone well in Oz since the Wizard left and that the Scarecrow and the Tin Woodman must travel to Kansas to find Dorothy. On the way, they mistake school children for munchkins and must navigate a New York City train terminal, to arrive in Kansas. Meanwhile, the head of the orphanage is exasperated with the way the girl deals with her loss and emotional trauma.

== Cast ==
- Jordan Van Vranken as Elizabeth Haskins/Dorothy Gale
- Orien Richman as Tin Woodman
- Jermel Nakia as Scarecrow
- Helen Richman as Mrs. Murphy
- Loren Lester as Dr. Edwards
- Peter Mark Richman as Charles Samuel Williams
- Sue Giosa as Ms. Thomson
- P. David Miller as Cowardly Lion
- Molly Bogner as Sassy orphan with second speaking line
- Sean Orr as Christopher

== Production ==
The film was shot at various locations in California, Illinois, Kansas, Missouri, New Jersey, and New York.

== Award ==
For her acting in After the Wizard, actress Jordan Van Vranken won a Young Artist Award in the 34th Young Artist Awards for Best Performance in a DVD Film: Young Actress.
