= Peter Mark Richman =

American actor (1927–2021)

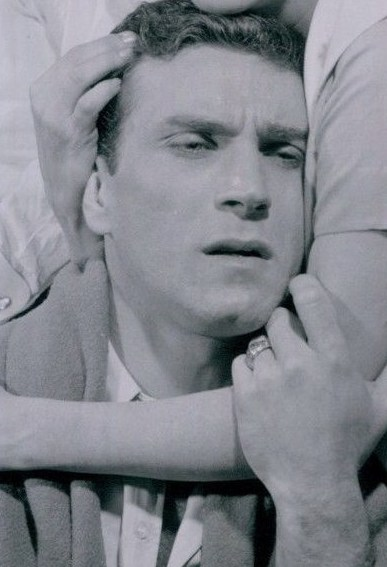
- Richman in Michael V. Gazzo's play A Hatful of Rain (1957)
- Born: Marvin Jack Richman; April 16, 1927; Philadelphia, Pennsylvania, U.S.
- Died: January 14, 2021 (aged 93); Los Angeles, California, U.S.
- Occupation: Actor
- Years active: 1949–2011
- Spouse: Helen Richman (m. 1953)
- Children: 5, including Lucas Richman
- Relatives: Julia Lester (granddaughter)
- Website: petermarkrichman.com

Peter Mark Richman (born Marvin Jack Richman; April 16, 1927 – January 14, 2021) was an American actor in films and on television, who was for many years credited as Mark Richman. He appeared in about 30 films and 130 television series from the 1950s until his retirement in 2011.

== Career ==
=== Films ===
Making his feature film debut in William Wyler's 1956 film Friendly Persuasion, Richman was, by that time, a regularly employed television actor, as well as a member of New York's Actors Studio, a resource of which he would avail himself frequently until moving to Los Angeles in 1961. He played Nicholas "Nick" Cain in the 1961 films The Murder Men and The Crimebusters, which were feature film compilations of episodes from his television series Cain's Hundred. His other films include Friday the 13th Part VIII: Jason Takes Manhattan (1989), and Vic (2005). His last film credits were Mysteria and After the Wizard, both released in 2011. Richman sat on the board of trustees of the Motion Picture and Television Fund.

=== Television ===
His television credits include Hawaii Five-O, Justice, The Fall Guy, The DuPont Show with June Allyson, Stoney Burke, Breaking Point, The Fugitive, The Outer Limits, Blue Light, The Invaders, Alfred Hitchcock Presents, The Man from U.N.C.L.E., The Wild Wild West, Bonanza, Daniel Boone, The Silent Force, Get Christie Love!, The Bionic Woman, Knight Rider, The Incredible Hulk, Mission: Impossible, Combat! and Matlock. He had multiple guest roles on The F.B.I. over its nine-year run. He appeared as Ralph Offenhouse in Star Trek: The Next Generation's first season episode "The Neutral Zone". Richman starred in the penultimate filmed episode of The Twilight Zone, titled "The Fear". He voiced The Phantom in the animated series Defenders of the Earth. Richman's other TV roles were on the soap opera Santa Barbara as Channing Creighton 'C.C.' Capwell (1984), Longstreet as Duke Paige, on the soap opera Dynasty as Andrew Laird (1981–1984), and a recurring role on Three's Company (1978–1979) as Chrissy's father, Rev. Luther Snow. He guest-starred on Beverly Hills, 90210.

== Personal life ==
Richman was married to actress Helen (Landess) Richman from 1953 until his death, and they had five children together, including composer and Grammy Award-winning conductor Lucas Richman. Before his acting career, he started off his career as a pharmacist. "My father died when I was 16 and my brother was kind of a surrogate father," recalled Richman. "He was a pharmacist and I worked in his store as a teenager. He thought I should get a real education so I ended up reluctantly going to pharmacy school. I expected to flunk out after six weeks but stuck it out, graduated, and became a licensed pharmacist in two states."

== Death ==
Richman died of natural causes in Woodland Hills, California, on January 14, 2021, at the age of 93.

== Partial filmography ==
=== Television ===
Year	Title	Role	Notes
1958–1960	Alfred Hitchcock Presents	Steve Barrett, Mike	2 episodes
1961–1962	Cain's Hundred	Nicholas Cain	Lead role
1963	The Outer Limits	Ian Fraser	Episode: "The Borderland"
1964	The Twilight Zone	Robert Franklin	Episode: "The Fear"
1965	The Outer Limits	Jefferson Rome	Episode: "The Probe"
1964–1966	Combat!	Captain Aptmayer, Charmand, German Lieutenant	2 episodes
1964–1966	The Fugitive	Johnny, Deputy Steel	2 episodes
1965	Dark Intruder	Robert Vanderburg	Television film
1965	The Wild Wild West	Prince Gio	Episode: "The Night of the Dancing Death"
1965–1974	The F.B.I.	Various characters	8 episodes
1966	Blue Light	Von Stafenburg	Episode: "The Friendly Enemy"
1966–1968	Voyage to the Bottom of the Sea	Gantt, John Hendrix	2 episodes
1967–1968	The Invaders	Tom Wiley, Andrew Hatcher	2 episodes ("The Leeches", "Inquisition")
1969	Hawaii Five-O	Nick Morgan	Episode: "Along Came Joey"
1969	Lancer	Bolton	Episode: "Angel Day and Her Sunshine Girls"
1970	House on Greenapple Road	Sal Gilman	Television film
1970	The Silent Force	Walter Garland	Episode: "A Deadly Game of Love"
1971-1972	Longstreet	Duke Paige	21 episodes
1973	The New Perry Mason	Ralph 'Junius' Addison	Episode: "The Case of the Horoscope Homicide"
1974	Hawkins	Paul Forbes	Episode: "Murder in the Slave Trade"
1974	Get Christie Love!	Young	Episode: "Market for Murder"
1976	Electra Woman and Dyna Girl	Pharaoh	2 episodes
1977	The Bionic Woman	Colonel Dubnov	Episode: "Escape to Love"
1978	Wonder Woman	Dr. Crippin	Episode: "Gault's Brain"
1978–1980	Vega$	Grady, Sam Ullman	3 episodes
1979	Three's Company	Reverend Snow	3 episodes
1979	Blind Ambition	Robert Mardian	4 episodes
1979, 1984	Hart to Hart	Owen Grant, Arthur Horton	2 episodes
1980	Galactica 1980	Colonel Briggs	Episode: "The Night the Cylons Landed"
1981–1984	Dynasty	Andrew Laird	27 episodes
1983–1984	Knight Rider	Klaus Bergstrom, Kleist	2 episodes
1984	Santa Barbara	C.C. (Channing Creighton) Capwell	Main Cast (July 30, 1984 - September 12, 1984)
1986	Defenders of the Earth	Kit Walker / Phantom (voice)	Main cast
1988	Star Trek: The Next Generation	Ralph Offenhouse	Episode: "The Neutral Zone"
1988	Murder, She Wrote	Lamar Bennett	Episode: "Deadline for Murder"
1989	Matlock	Adam Whitley	Episode: “The other woman”
1990	Swamp Thing	Falco	Episode: "Falco"
1994	Batman: The Animated Series	Charles Baxter (voice)	Episode: "Riddler's Reform"
1996	Spider-Man	Old Spider-Man (voice)	Episode: "The Final Nightmare"
1999	Superman: The Animated Series	Guardian #1, Abin Sur (voice)	Episode: "In Brightest Day..."
2000	Batman Beyond	Winchell (voice)	Episode: "Inqueling"
2009	His Name Was Jason: 30 Years of Friday the 13th	Himself	Documentary film

=== Film ===
Year	Title	Role	Notes
1956	Friendly Persuasion	Gard Jordan	
1957	The Strange One	Cadet Colonel Corger	
1958	Girls on the Loose	Police Lieutenant Bill Hanley	
1959	The Black Orchid	Noble	
1961	The Murder Men	Nick Cain	
1962	The Crimebusters	Nicholas Cain	
1966	Agent for H.A.R.M.	Adam Chance	
1968	For Singles Only	Gerald Pryor	
1971	Yuma	Major Lucas	
1980	PSI Factor	Edgar Hamilton	
1988	Judgement Day	Priest	
1989	Friday the 13th Part VIII: Jason Takes Manhattan	Charles McCulloch	
1991	The Naked Gun 2½: The Smell of Fear	Arthur Dunwell	
2002	Poolhall Junkies	Phillip	
2006	Vic	Paul Marcus	Short film
2011	After the Wizard	Charles Williams	
2011	Mysteria	Senator Mitchell	
2013	Crystal Lake Memories: The Complete History of Friday the 13th	Himself	Documentary film
