= Cain's Hundred =

- Genre: Police procedural; Legal drama
- Created by: Paul Monash
- Written by: Eliot Asinof; Franklin Barton; George Bellak; Joe Calvelli; Robert Culp; Robert C. Dennis; Fred Freiberger; Mel Goldberg; David Karp; Norma Katkov; Daniel Mainwaring; Dave Malloy; Paul Monash; E. Jack Neuman; Les Pine; Jim Thompson
- Directed by: Tom Gries; Irvin Kershner; Buzz Kulik; John Peyser; Sydney Pollack; Boris Sagal
- Starring: Peter Mark Richman
- Theme music composer: Jerry Goldsmith
- Composers: Jerry Goldsmith; Fred Steiner; Morton Stevens; Jeff Alexander
- Country of origin: United States
- Original language: English
- No. of seasons: 1
- No. of episodes: 30

Production
- Executive producer: Paul Monash
- Producer: Charles Russell
- Running time: 60 minutes
- Production companies: Vanadas Productions; MGM Television

Original release
- Network: NBC
- Release: September 19, 1961 – May 15, 1962

Cain's Hundred is an American crime drama series that aired on NBC from 1961 to 1962. The series was produced by Vanadas Productions, Inc. in association with MGM Television.

== Synopsis ==
Cain's Hundred follows the life of Nicholas Cain (Peter Mark Richman), a former lawyer for the mob. After becoming engaged to be married, Cain decides to leave his life of crime. His departure from the underworld, however, prompts a mob boss to put out a "hit" on him, but the gunman misses Cain and mistakenly kills his fiancée Stella (portrayed by Carol Rossen). Seeking revenge, Cain then teams up with the Federal Bureau of Investigation to find and bring 100 mobsters to justice.

The series aired opposite The Garry Moore Show, a variety show that aired on CBS.

== Cast ==
- Peter Mark Richman as Nicholas Cain
- Carol Rossen as Stella Caulfield

=== Notable guest stars ===
- Philip Abbott
- Edward Andrews
- Ed Asner
- Jim Backus
- Martin Balsam
- Majel Barrett
- Robert Blake
- Lloyd Bochner
- Charles Bronson
- James Coburn
- Michael Constantine
- Alex Cord
- Robert Culp
- Dorothy Dandridge
- Sammy Davis Jr.
- Bruce Dern
- Ivan Dixon
- Donna Douglas
- Robert Duvall
- Barbara Eden
- Norman Fell
- John Goddard
- Harold Gould
- Beverly Garland
- Arthur Hanson
- Pat Hingle
- David Janssen
- DeForest Kelley
- Jack Klugman
- Ted Knight
- Lou Krugman
- Cloris Leachman
- Jack Lord
- Gavin MacLeod
- Ricardo Montalbán
- Juanita Moore
- Leonard Nimoy
- Susan Oliver
- Judson Pratt
- Jack Reitzen
- Don Rickles
- Chris Robinson
- Marion Ross
- Telly Savalas
- Alfred Shelly
- Walter Slezak
- Arthur Tovey
- Robert Vaughn
- Jersey Joe Walcott
- Ray Walston
- Fritz Weaver

== Episodes ==
No.	Title	Directed by	Written by	Original release date	Prod. code
1	"Crime and Commitment"	Boris Sagal	David Karp (story), David Karp and Paul Monash (teleplay)	September 19, 1961	6409
Powerful mob chief George Vincent plots the murder of Nicholas Cain when he learns of Cain's plan to quit the rackets.
2	"Rules of Evidence: George Vincent"	Boris Sagal	David Karp (story), David Karp and Paul Monash (teleplay)	September 26, 1961	6410
George Vincent is prosecuted by Nicholas Cain in a kangaroo court after Vincent kills Cain's fiancee. Note: This episode and "Crime and Commitment" were shown outside North America in cinemas as a motion picture called The Crimebusters.
3	"Blue Water, White Beach: Edward Hoagley"	John Peyser	E. Jack Neuman	October 3, 1961	6411
An abandoned distillery truck which is made to look like a hit-and run accident leads Cain to an illegal bootleg king.
4	"Markdown on a Man: Lenny Bircher"	Unknown	Unknown	October 10, 1961	6404
Cain finds an entire industry silenced by fear when he tries to gather evidence against a man who controls the produce market.
5	"Frank Andreotis: Degrees of Guilt"	Irvin Kershner	Paul Monash	October 17, 1961	6401
In trying to get at a crime czar, Cain finds his soft spot—his daughter.
6	"King of the Mountain: Herman Coombs"	Sydney Pollock	Story by : Lewis Meltzer & George Bellak; Teleplay by : George Bellak	October 24, 1961	6419
Rural crime chief Herman Coombs threatens to kill Cain for trying to close down a syndicate-controlled, vice-ridden community.
7	"The Penitent: Louis Strode"	Unknown	Unknown	October 31, 1961	6412
Cain refuses to believe that an organization narcotics chief has quit the rackets because his son died in an accident stemming from drug addiction.
8	"Comeback"	Unknown	Unknown	November 7, 1961	6417
Cain probes for information against a hoodlum who controls professional boxing.
9	"Dead Load: Dave Braddock"	Tom Gries	Fred Freiberger	November 21, 1961	6409
The gang-style beating of a dock worker spurs Cain's crime-busting efforts against a waterfront extortionist.
10	"In the Balance: Phillip Hallson"	John Peyser	George Bellak	November 28, 1961	6422
Questions abound when a corrupt judge tries the case of an influential racketeer.
11	"Five for One: James Condon"	Charles Haas	Story by : Jim Thompson; Teleplay by : Norman Katkov & Jim Thompson	December 5, 1961	6413
A costume jewelry manufacturer devises a gold-smuggling scheme.
12	"The Fixer: Ray Riley"	Unknown	Unknown	December 12, 1961	6418
Cain tries to prevent a sheriff from turning an entire county over to a syndicate for use as a vice center.
13	"Final Judgment: Alexander Marish"	Unknown	Unknown	December 19, 1961	6406
A dress manufacturer rebuffs Cain when he seeks help in attempting to rid the garment industry of a trucking alliance headed by a racketeer.
14	"The Plush Jungle: Benjamin Riker"	Alvin Ganzer	Franklin Barton	January 2, 1962	6421
A hoodlum conspires to take over an international transportation company for smuggling purposes.
15	"Take a Number: Jack Garsell"	Alan Crosland, Jr.	Fred Freiberger	January 9, 1962	6427
A numbers racket king and his bookkeeper refuse to supply Cain with necessary information.
16	"The Debasers: Milton Bonner and Phillip Colerane"	John Peyser	S.S. Schweitzer	January 16, 1962	6426
A racketeer attempts to obtain respectability after previously making his money in pornography.
17	"The Schemer: William Norman"	Unknown	Unknown	January 23, 1962	6425
A racketeer hires Cain to defend a gambling czar.
18	"The Manipulator: Raymond Cruz"	Unknown	Unknown	January 30, 1962	6429
A professional rabble-rouser spreads fear and racial strife through a slum neighborhood.
19	"Murder by Proxy: Earl Klegg"	Elliot Silverstein	Franklin Barton	February 6, 1962	6433
Cain risks his reputation when he prepares a flimsy murder case against a man already in prison.
20	"Blood Money"	Unknown	Unknown	February 13, 1962	6428
Four men try to gain control of the district attorney's office in a wide-open town.
21	"Blues for a Junkman: Arthur Troy"	Robert Gist	Mel Goldberg	February 20, 1962	6430
Cain helps a nightclub singer kick her drug habit so that she can try for another entertainer's permit.
22	"The New Order: Peter Long"	Tom Gries	Fred Freiberger	March 6, 1962	6437
Cain teams with federal agent Steve Strohm in an investigation of competing loan shark operations.
23	"Cost of Living: Howard Judlow"	John Peyser	Franklin Barton	March 20, 1962	6441
Syndicate-controlled bail bondsmen tries to sever his underworld connections when he becomes involved in a murder.
24	"Savage in Darkness"	Unknown	Unknown	March 27, 1962	6435
A blind mobster attempts to force a produce company owner to transport drugs for a syndicate.
25	"The Swinger"	Unknown	Unknown	April 3, 1962	6442
Cain seeks help from an entertainer in locating a meeting of gang members.
26	"Inside Track"	John Peyser	S.S. Schweitzer	April 10, 1962	6440
A racketeer uses influence and bribery on a state legislature to prevent a sportsman from building a new horse-racing track.
27	"A Creature Lurks in Ambush"	Tom Gries	Oliver Crawford & Peter Agricola	April 17, 1962	6436
A syndicate gambler bribes a college basketball star, trying to prove that dishonesty is no rarity.
28	"Women of Silure"	Unknown	Unknown	April 24, 1962	6431
Cain travels to Corsica to determine whether a deported gangster should be re-admitted to the United States.
29	"The Left Side of Canada"	Robert Altman	S. Lee Pogostin	May 1, 1962	6446
Cain sets his sights on the accountant for a mob boss, a thug who "exiled" a singer to Alaska after his nephew fell in love with her.
30	"Quick Brown Fox"	Unknown	Unknown	May 15, 1962	6447
A reporter tries to cut his connection with an underworld leader so that he can become respectable.
