= List of Batman films cast members =

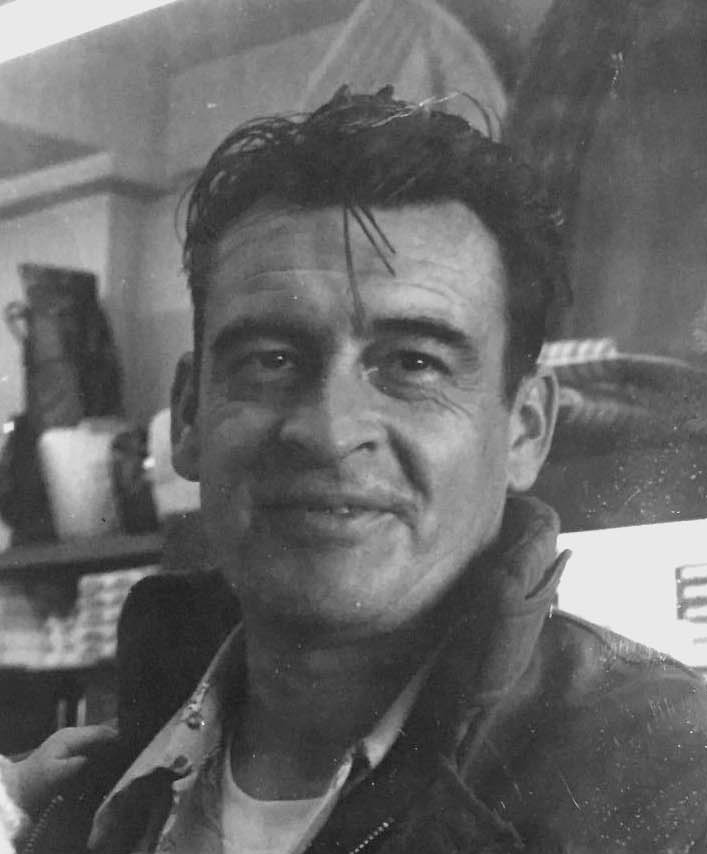
Lewis Wilson

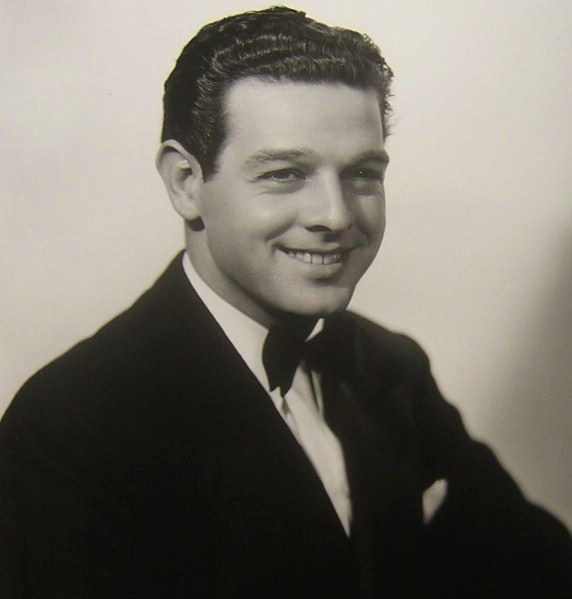
Robert Lowery

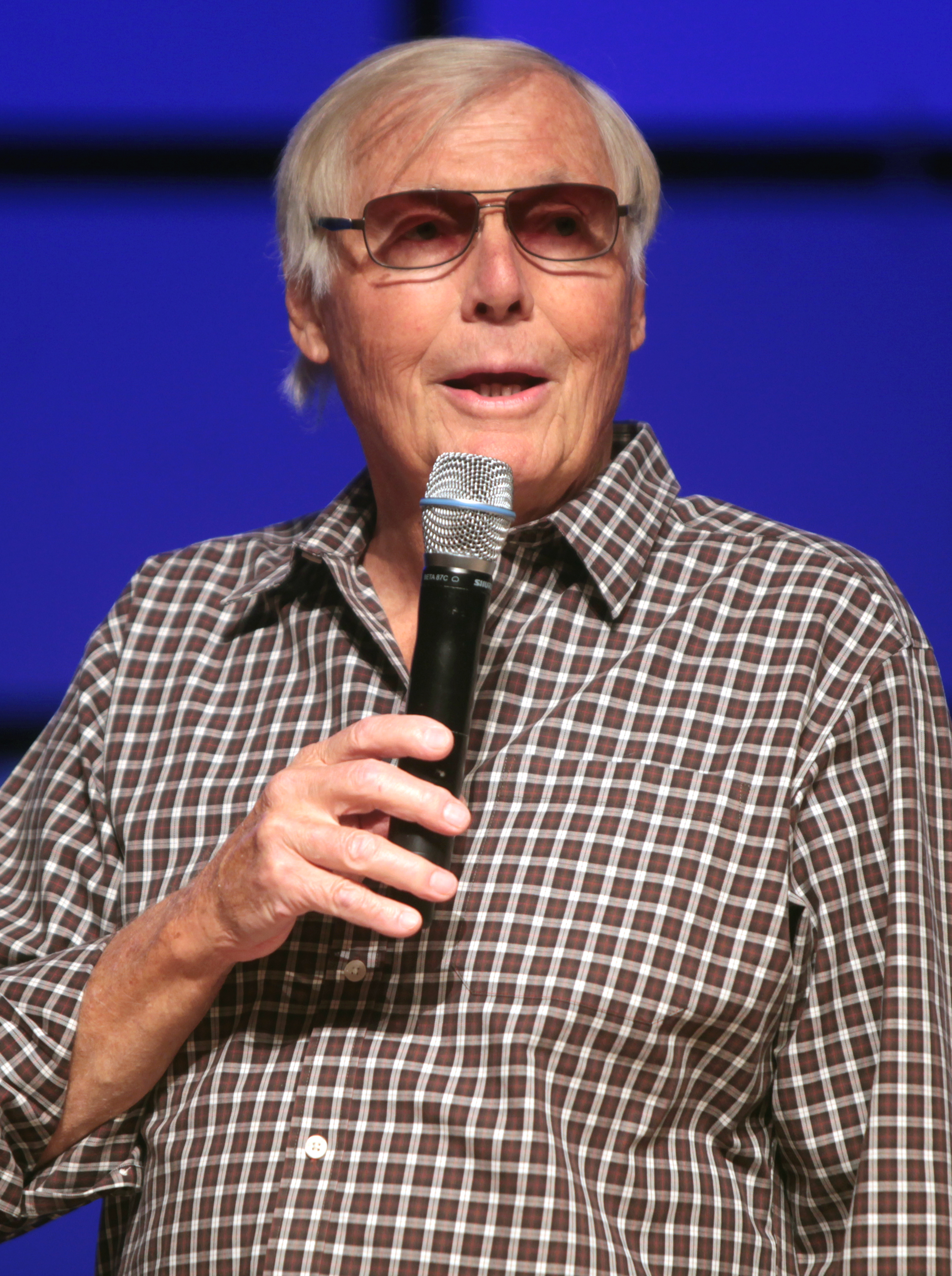
Adam West

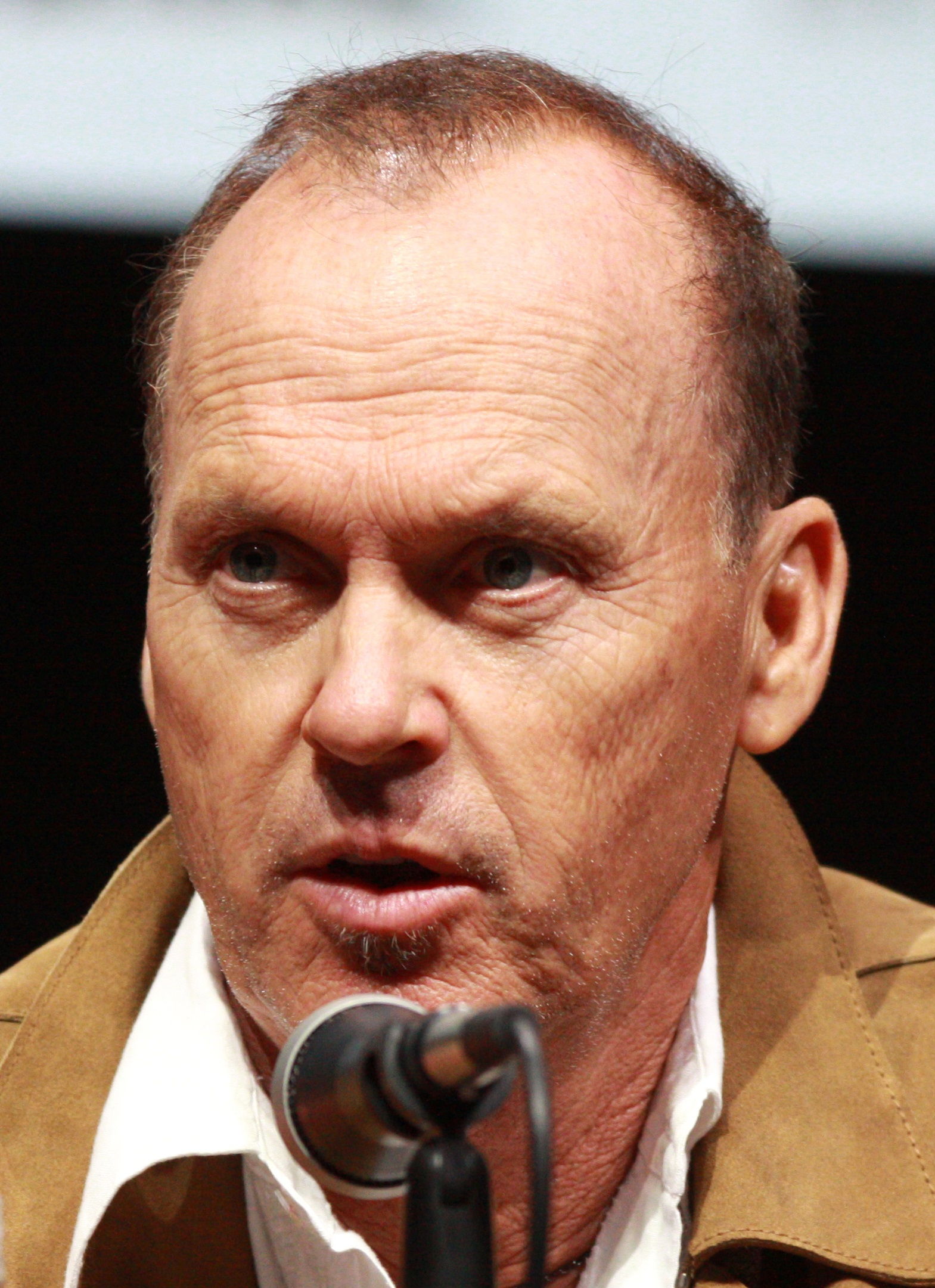
Michael Keaton

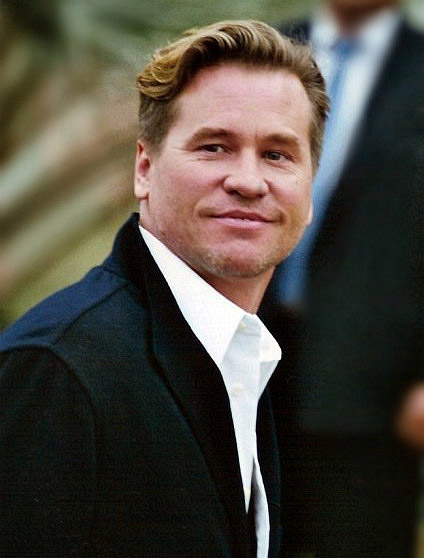
Val Kilmer

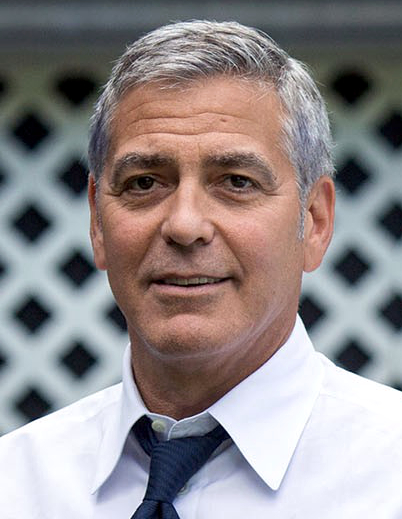
George Clooney

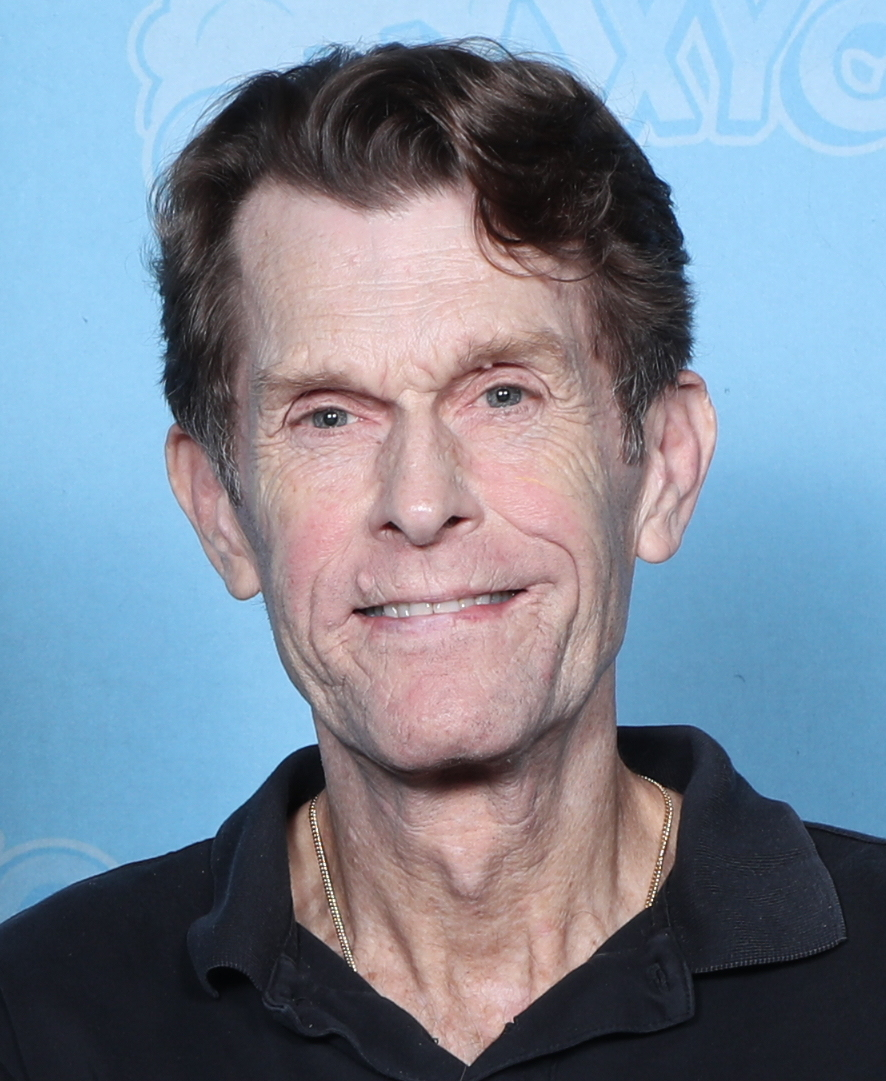
Kevin Conroy

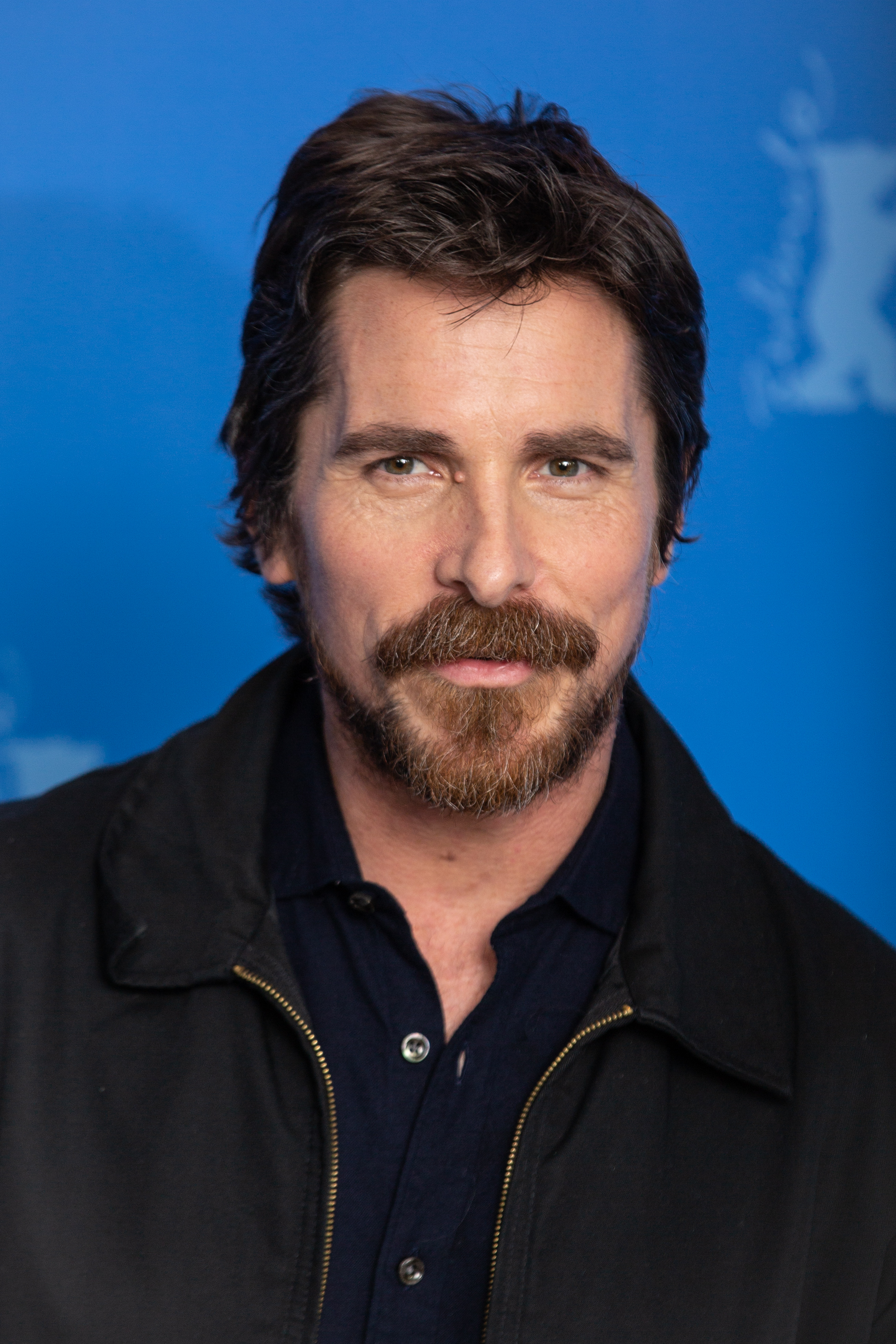
Christian Bale

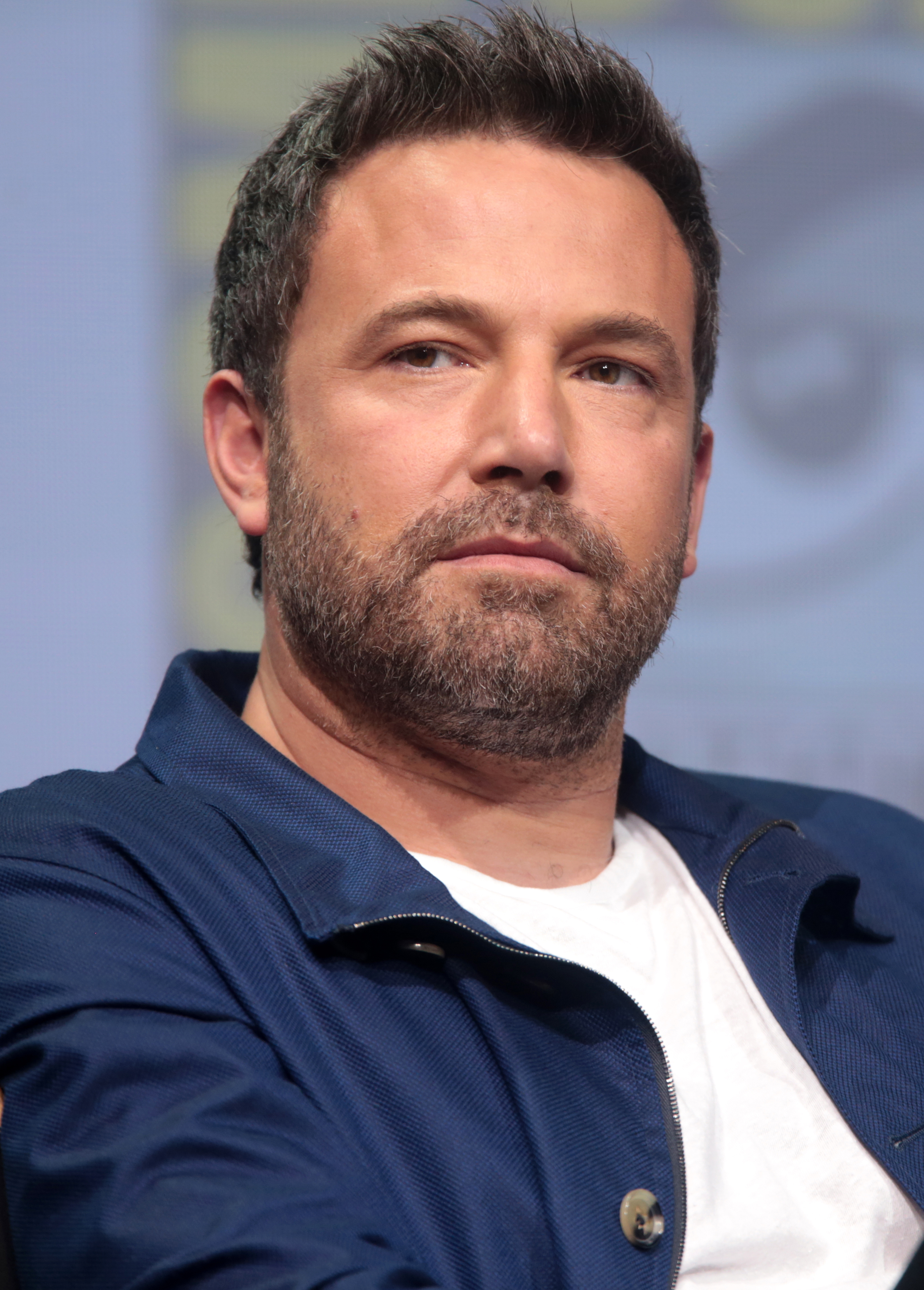
Ben Affleck

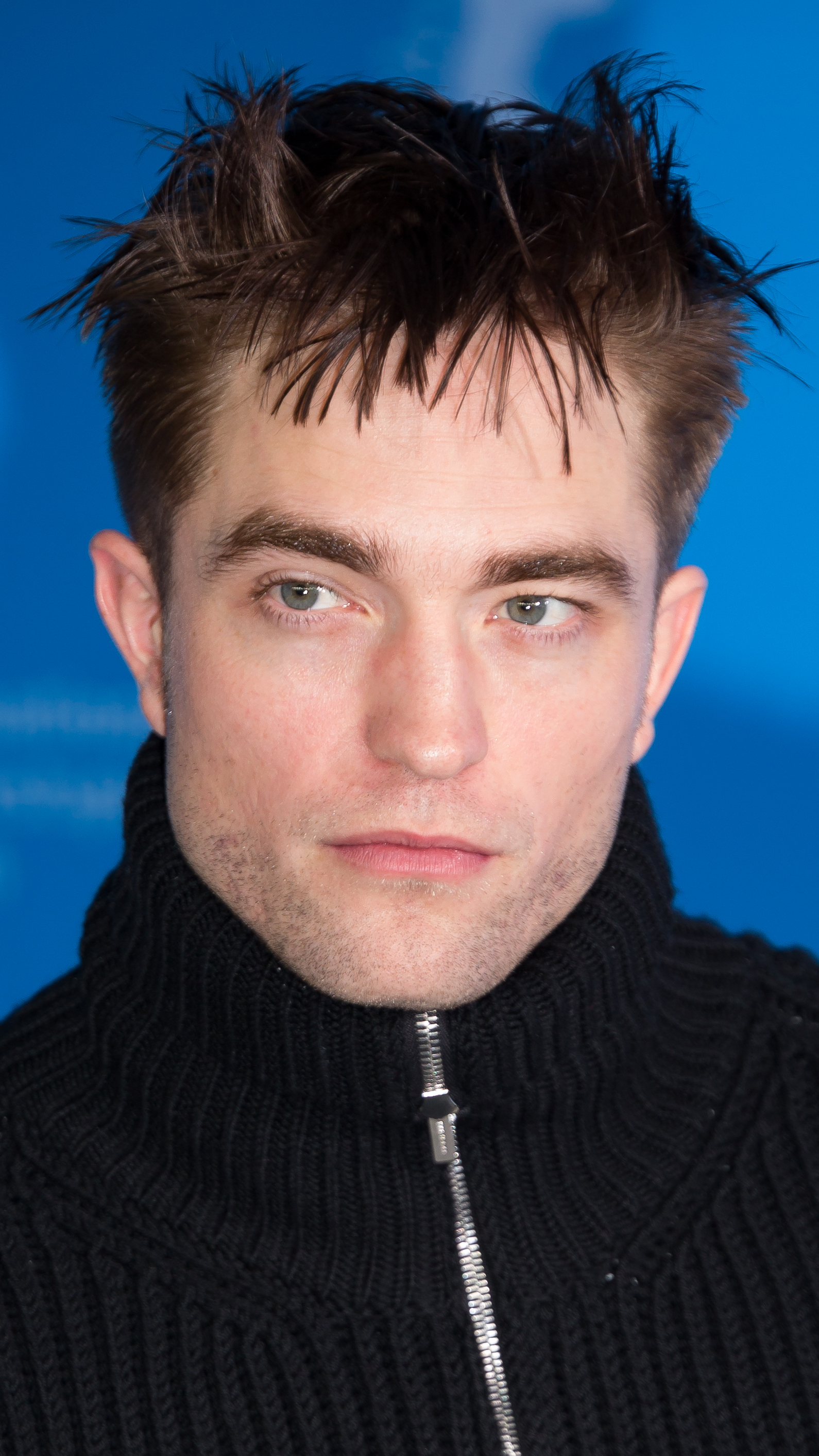
Robert Pattinson

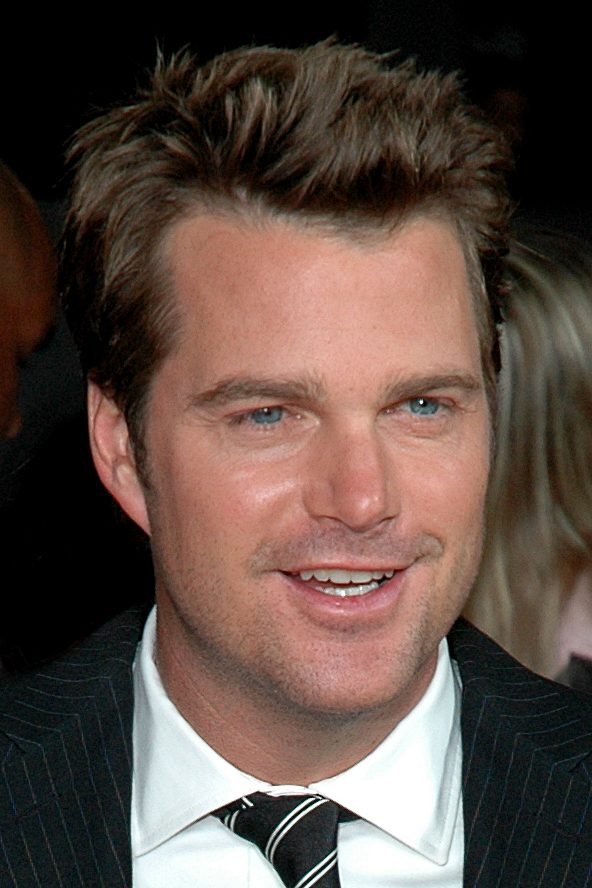
Chris O'Donnell

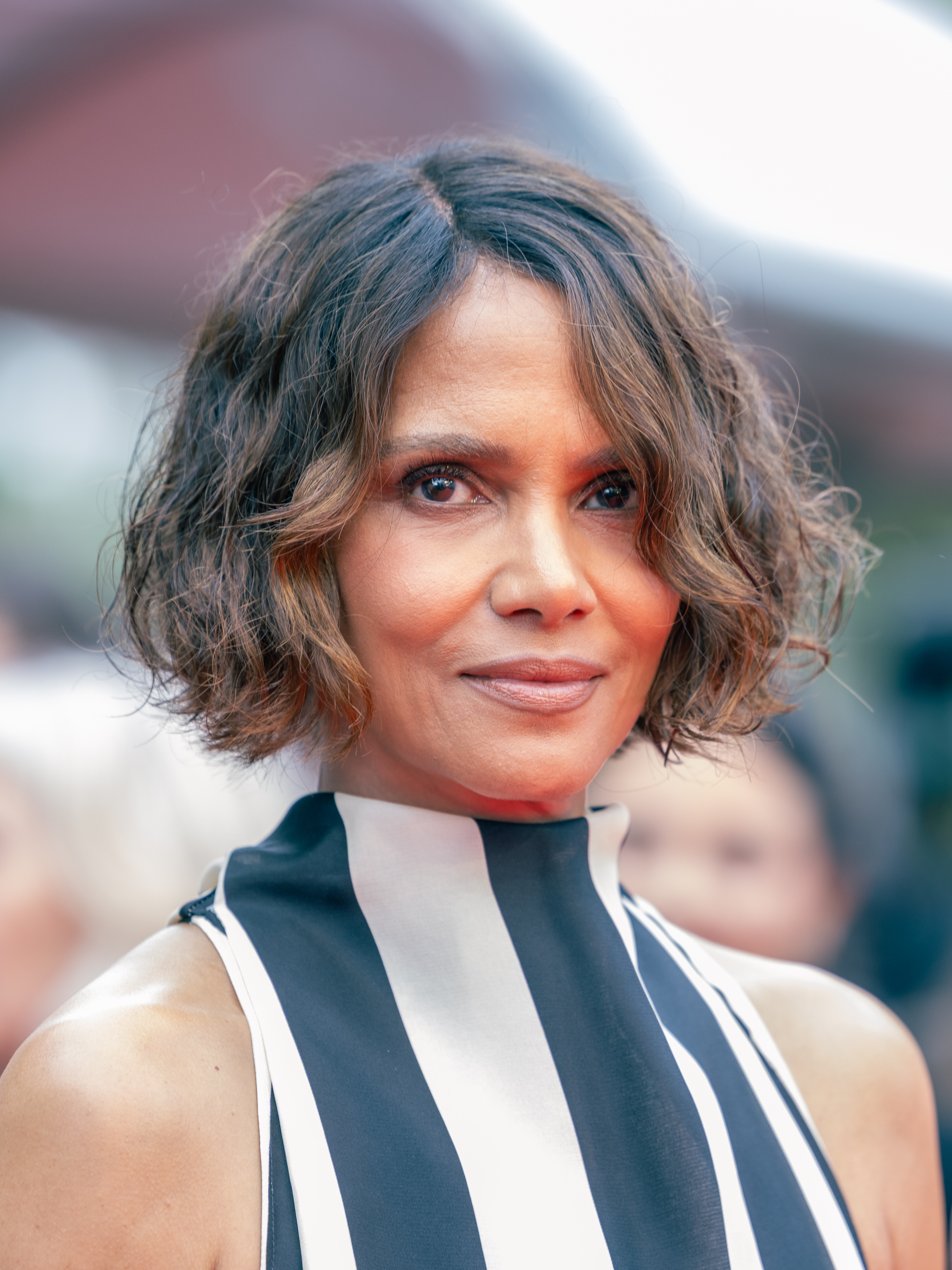
Halle Berry

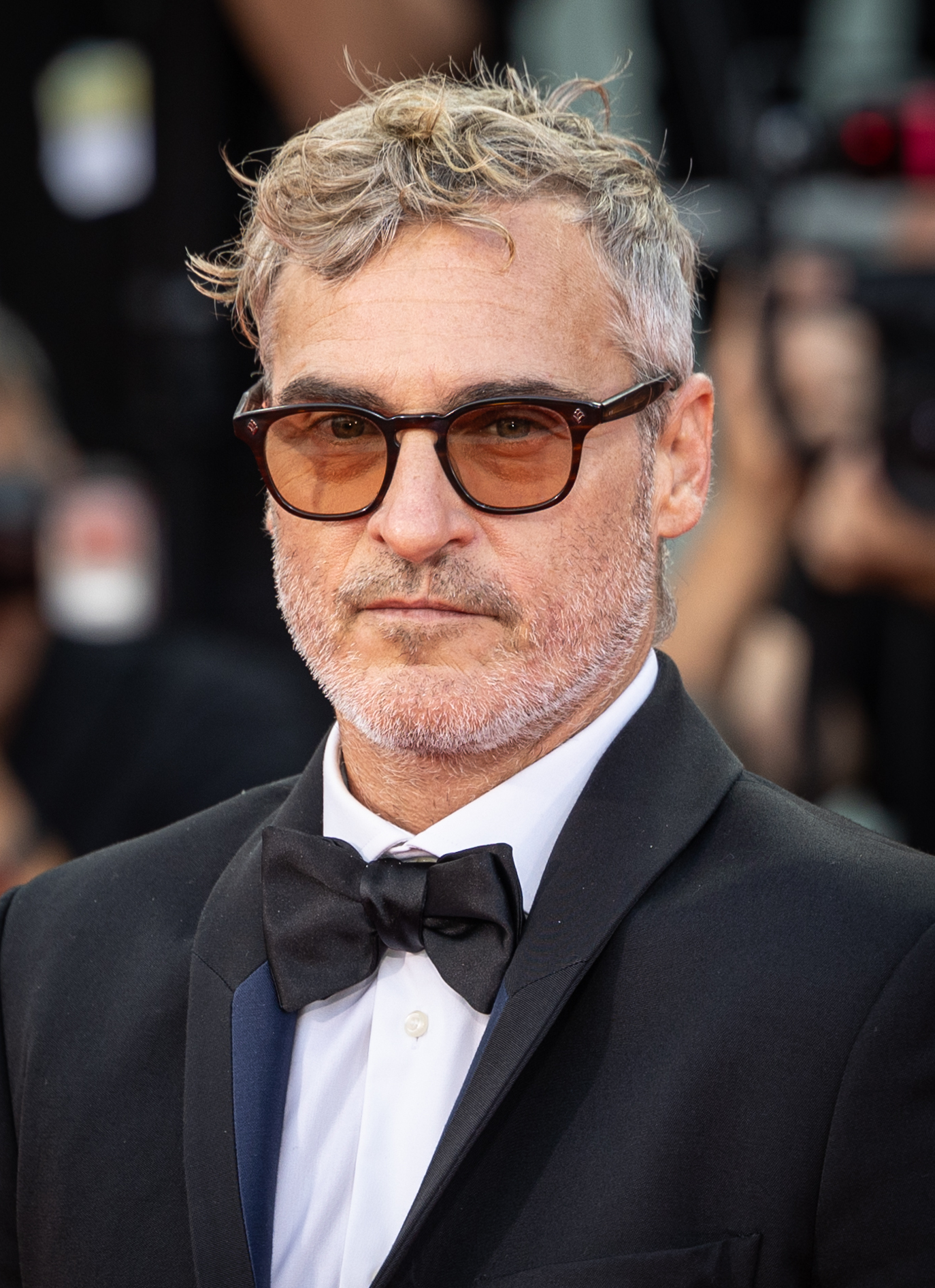
Joaquin Phoenix

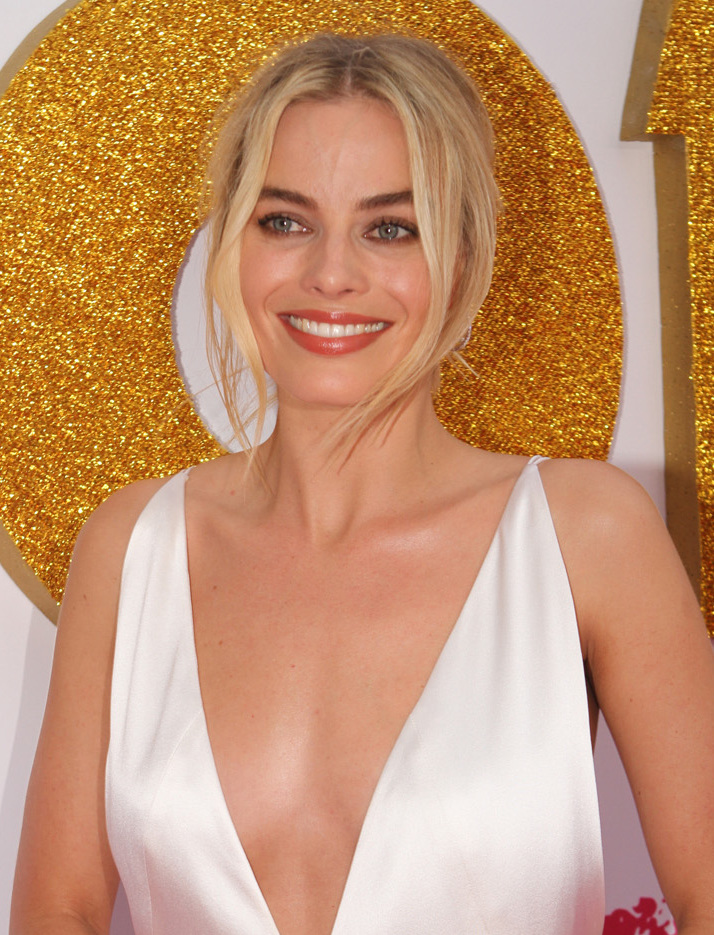
Margot Robbie

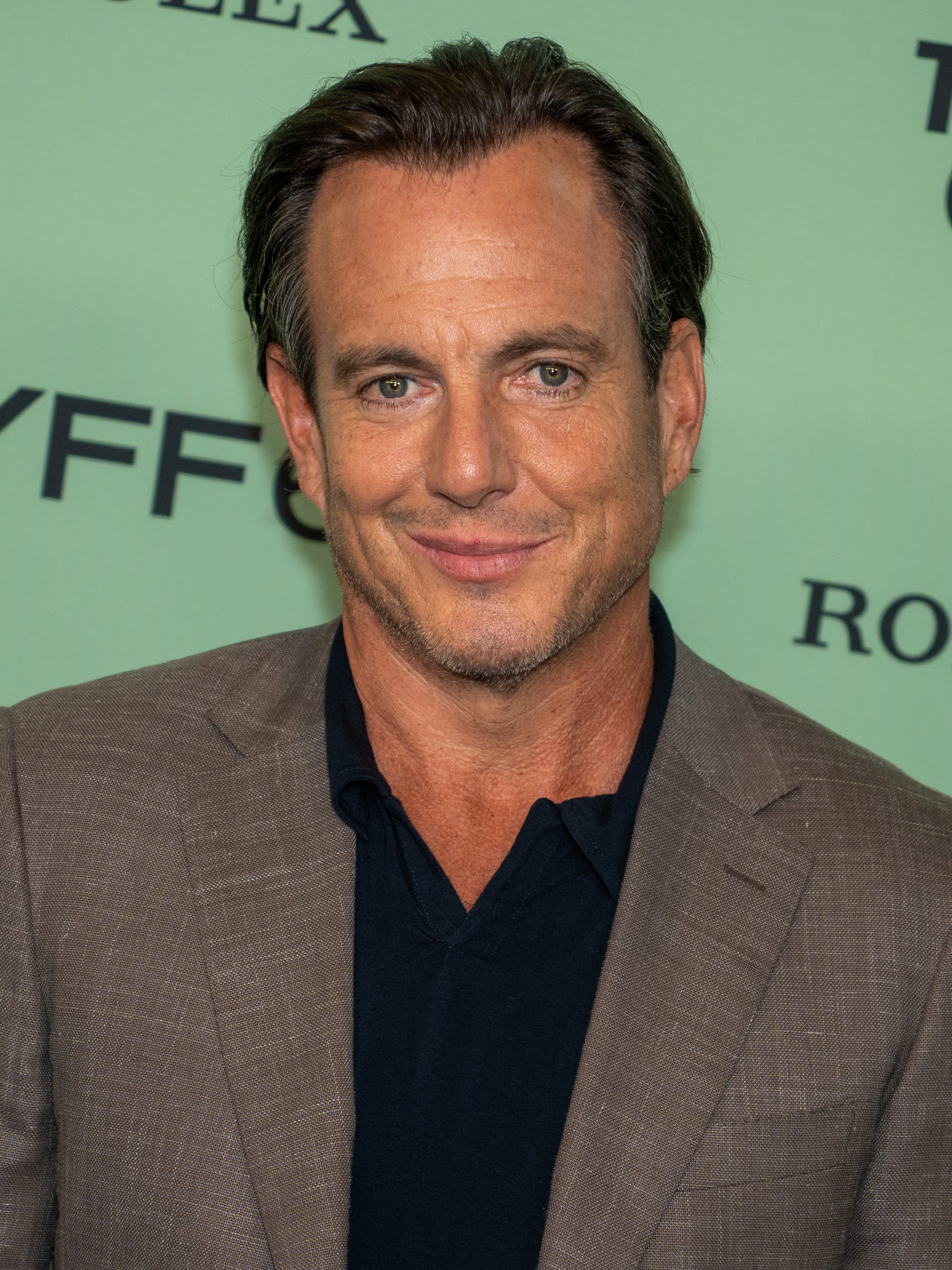
Will Arnett

The following is a list of cast members who voiced or portrayed characters appearing in the Batman films. The list is sorted by film and character, as some characters may have been portrayed by multiple actors.

Actors Lewis Wilson and Robert Lowery first appeared as the character in the serial films Batman (1943) and Batman and Robin (1949). While Adam West reprised his role as Batman from the 1960s television series in Batman (1966) and voiced the character in the animated follow-ups Batman: Return of the Caped Crusaders (2016) and Batman vs. Two-Face (2017).

In the Burton / Schumacher films, this iteration of the character is first portrayed by Michael Keaton in Batman (1989), Batman Returns (1992) and later would reprise the role in the DC Extended Universe (DCEU) film, The Flash and the unreleased film Batgirl. Actor Val Kilmer replaced Keaton in the role for Batman Forever (1995) and would then be replaced by George Clooney in Batman & Robin (1997) co-heading with Chris O'Donnell reprising his role as Dick Grayson / Robin from Batman Forever. The series was later cancelled due to the lukewarm reception to Batman & Robin. Actor Kevin Conroy voiced the character in multiple theatrical and direct-to-DVD films as multiple iterations of the character from 1992 to 2024. This started with reprising his role from the DC Animated Universe in Batman: Mask of the Phantasm (1993), Batman & Mr. Freeze: SubZero (1998), Batman Beyond: Return of the Joker (2000), Batman: Mystery of the Batwoman (2003) and Batman and Harley Quinn (2017). Conroy would later voice the character in numerous films in the DC Universe Animated Original Movies.

In Christopher Nolan's The Dark Knight trilogy, this iteration of the character is portrayed by Christian Bale in Batman Begins (2005), The Dark Knight (2008) and The Dark Knight Rises (2012). In 2016, a new iteration of the character was introduced in the DC Extended Universe (DCEU), portrayed by Ben Affleck. In the films Batman v Superman: Dawn of Justice, Suicide Squad (both 2016), Justice League (2017) as well as the film's director's cut (2021) and in The Flash (2022). Will Arnett voiced the character in The Lego Movie franchise (2014–2019) and Dante Pereira-Olson portrays a younger version of Bruce Wayne in Joker (2019). Currently, Robert Pattinson is portraying a younger iteration of the character in Matt Reeves' films, The Batman (2022) and the upcoming The Batman: Part II (2028).

While Halle Berry, Joaquin Phoenix, Margot Robbie and Tom Rhys Harries headlined numerous spin-off Batman villain films in Catwoman (2004), Todd Phillips' Joker films (2019-24), Birds of Prey (2020) and Clayface (2026).

== Films ==
List indicators

This section includes characters who will appear or have appeared in noteworthy roles.

- An empty grey cell indicates the character was not in the film, or that the character's official presence has not yet been confirmed.
- ^{A} indicates an appearance through archival footage or audio.
- ^{C} indicates a cameo role.
- ^{E} indicates an appearance not included in the theatrical cut.
- ^{P} indicates an appearance in onscreen photographs.
- ^{S} indicates an appearance through use of special effects.
- ^{V} indicates a voice-only role.
- ^{Y} indicates a younger version of the character.

== Feature-length live-action films ==
=== Early films ===
==== Serial films (1943–1949) ====
Characters	Batman	Batman and Robin
Characters	1943	1949
Bruce Wayne Batman	Lewis Wilson	Robert Lowery
Richard "Dick" Grayson Robin	Douglas Croft	Johnny Duncan
Alfred Pennyworth	William Austin	Eric Wilton
Dr. Daka	J. Carrol Naish	
Linda Page	Shirley Patterson	
James Gordon		Lyle Talbot
Vicki Vale		Jane Adams

==== Batman '66 films (1966; 2016–2017) ====
The Batman '66 films serve as extensions of the 1960s Batman TV series. A companion feature film was released in 1966 between the first and second seasons of the TV show, while two animated films were released in 2016 and 2017 respectively.

Characters	Television series	Feature film	Animated films	
Characters	Batman	Batman	Batman: Return of the Caped Crusaders	Batman vs. Two-Face
Characters	1966–68	1966	2016	2017
Bruce Wayne Batman	Adam West	Adam West	Adam West^{V}	Adam West^{V}
Richard "Dick" Grayson Robin	Burt Ward	Burt Ward	Burt Ward^{V}	Burt Ward^{V}
Introduced in the television series
Catwoman	Julie Newmar; Eartha Kitt	Lee Meriwether	Julie Newmar^{V}	Julie Newmar^{V}
Harriet Cooper	Madge Blake	Madge Blake	Lynne Marie Stewart^{V}	Lynne Marie Stewart^{V}
Warden Crichton	David Lewis		Thomas Lennon^{V}	Thomas Lennon^{V}
James Gordon	Neil Hamilton	Neil Hamilton	Jim Ward^{V}	Jim Ward^{V}
Joker	Cesar Romero	Cesar Romero	Jeff Bergman^{V}	Jeff Bergman^{V}
King Tut	Victor Buono		No voice actor	Wally Wingert^{V}
Chief Miles O'Hara	Stafford Repp	Stafford Repp	Thomas Lennon^{V}	Thomas Lennon^{V}
Penguin	Burgess Meredith	Burgess Meredith	William Salyers^{V}	William Salyers^{V}
Alfred Pennyworth	Alan Napier	Alan Napier	Steven Weber^{V}	Steven Weber^{V}
Riddler	Frank Gorshin; John Astin	Frank Gorshin	Wally Wingert^{V}	Wally Wingert^{V}
Introduced in Batman vs. Two-Face
Lucilee Diamond				Lee Meriwether^{V}
Harvey Dent Two-Face				William Shatner^{V}
Harleen Quinzel				Sirena Irwin^{V}
Hugo Strange				Jim Ward^{V}

=== Burton and Schumacher series (1989–1997) ===
The Burton and Schumacher series is a series of American superhero films with the first two installments directed by Tim Burton and the following two installments directed by Joel Schumacher. The two Burton films left a legacy and influenced Hollywood's modern marketing and development techniques of the superhero film genre. While Schumacher's Batman & Robin (1997) is regarded as one of the worst rated superhero films of all time.

Many Batman storylines serve as inspiration, such as Batman: The Killing Joke, the tone of The Dark Knight Returns, The Man Behind the Red Hood! and Catwoman: Her Sister's Keeper. In 2023, it was retroactively confirmed that the Burton-directed and Schumacher-directed films are set in two different continuities.

Characters	Burton–directed films		Schumacher–directed films	
Characters	Batman	Batman Returns	Batman Forever	Batman & Robin
Characters	1989	1992	1995	1997
Bruce Wayne Batman	Michael Keaton; Charles Roskilly^{Y}	Michael Keaton	Val Kilmer; Ramsey Ellis^{Y}	George Clooney; Eric Lloyd^{Y}
Introduced in Batman
Bob	Tracey Walter			
Mayor Borg	Lee Wallace			
Harvey Dent Two-Face	Billy Dee Williams		Tommy Lee Jones	
Lieutenant Max Eckhardt	William Hootkins			
James Gordon	Pat Hingle	Pat Hingle	Pat Hingle	Pat Hingle
Carl Grissom	Jack Palance			
Alicia Hunt	Jerry Hall			
Alexander Knox	Robert Wuhl			
Jack Napier The Joker	Jack Nicholson Hugo E. Blick^{Y}		David U. Hodges^{C}^{Y}	
Alfred Pennyworth	Michael Gough	Michael Gough	Michael Gough	Michael Gough; Jon Simmons^{Y}
Vicki Vale	Kim Basinger			
Martha Wayne	Sharon Holm		Eileen Seeley	
Thomas Wayne	David Baxt		Michael Scranton	
Introduced in Batman Returns
Oswald Cobblepot The Penguin		Danny DeVito		
Esther Cobblepot		Diane Salinger		
Tucker Cobblepot		Paul Reubens		
The Ice Princess		Cristi Conaway		
Selina Kyle Catwoman		Michelle Pfeiffer		
Mayor of Gotham City		Michael Murphy		
The Organ Grinder		Vincent Schiavelli		
The Poodle Lady		Anna Katarina		
Charles "Chip" Shreck		Andrew Bryniarski		
Max Shreck		Christopher Walken		
The Tattooed Strongman		Rick Zumwalt		
The Thin Clown		Doug Jones		
Introduced in Batman Forever
Dr. Burton			René Auberjonois	
Gossip Gerty			Elizabeth Sanders	Elizabeth Sanders
John Grayson			Larry A. Lee	
Mary Grayson			Glory Fioramonti	
Richard "Dick" Grayson Robin			Chris O'Donnell	Chris O'Donnell
Mayor of Gotham City			George Wallace	
Dr. Chase Meridian			Nicole Kidman	
Edward Nygma The Riddler			Jim Carrey	
Spice			Debi Mazar	
Fred Stickley			Ed Begley Jr.	
Sugar			Drew Barrymore	
Introduced in Batman & Robin
Antonio Diego Bane				Michael Reid MacKay Robert Swenson
Nora Fries				Vendela Kirsebom
Victor Fries Mister Freeze				Arnold Schwarzenegger
Ms. B. Haven				Vivica A. Fox
Pamela Isley Poison Ivy				Uma Thurman
Dr. Lee				Michael Paul Chan
Julie Madison				Elle Macpherson
Barbara Wilson Batgirl				Alicia Silverstone
Dr. Jason Woodrue				John Glover

=== The Dark Knight trilogy (2005–2012) ===
The Dark Knight is a trilogy of American superhero films all directed by Christopher Nolan. A reboot of the Batman film series, it is credited for revitalizing the Batman character in popular culture, shifting its tone towards a darker and more serious/realistic tone and style. Many Batman storylines serve as inspiration, such as Batman: Year One, The Killing Joke, The Long Halloween, Knightfall, The Dark Knight Returns and No Man's Land. The trilogy has been ranked among the greatest ever made.

Characters	Nolan–directed films			Animated film
Characters	Batman Begins	The Dark Knight	The Dark Knight Rises	Batman: Gotham Knight
Characters	2005	2008	2012	2008
Bruce Wayne Batman	Christian Bale; Gus Lewis^{Y}	Christian Bale	Christian Bale; Gus Lewis^{A}^{Y}	Kevin Conroy^{V} Hynden Walch^{Y}^{V}
Introduced in Batman Begins
Ra's al Ghul	Liam Neeson		Liam Neeson^{C} Josh Pence^{Y}	
Joe Chill	Richard Brake			No voice actor
Jonathan Crane Scarecrow	Cillian Murphy	Cillian Murphy	Cillian Murphy	Corey Burton^{V}
Rachel Dawes	Katie Holmes; Emma Lockhart^{Y}	Maggie Gyllenhaal	Maggie Gyllenhaal^{A}^{P}	
Decoy Ra's al Ghul	Ken Watanabe			
William Earle	Rutger Hauer			
High Court Judge Faden	Gerard Murphy			
Carmine Falcone	Tom Wilkinson			
Carl Finch	Larry Holden			
Arnold Flass	Mark Boone Junior			
Lucius Fox	Morgan Freeman	Morgan Freeman	Morgan Freeman	Kevin Michael Richardson^{V}
James Gordon	Gary Oldman	Gary Oldman	Gary Oldman	Jim Meskimen^{V}
Gillian B. Loeb	Colin McFarlane	Colin McFarlane		
Alfred Pennyworth	Michael Caine	Michael Caine	Michael Caine	David McCallum^{V}
Martha Wayne	Sara Stewart			Andrea Romano^{V}
Thomas Wayne	Linus Roache		Linus Roache^{A}	Jason Marsden^{V}
Victor Zsasz	Tim Booth			
Introduced in The Dark Knight
The Chechen		Ritchie Coster		
Harvey Dent		Aaron Eckhart	Aaron Eckhart^{A}^{P}	
Mike Engel		Anthony Michael Hall		
Gambol		Michael Jai White		
Mayor Anthony Garcia		Néstor Carbonell	Néstor Carbonell	
Barbara Eileen Gordon		Melinda McGraw		
James Gordon Jr.		Nathan Gamble		
The Joker		Heath Ledger		
Lau		Chin Han		
Sal Maroni		Eric Roberts		Rob Paulsen^{V}
Anna Ramirez		Monique Gabriela Curnen		Ana Ortiz^{V}
Coleman Reese		Joshua Harto		
Gerard Stephens		Keith Szarabajka		
Michael Wuertz		Ron Dean		
Introduced in The Dark Knight Rises
Talia al Ghul			Marion Cotillard; Joey King^{Y}	
Bane			Tom Hardy	
Barsad			Josh Stewart	
Robin John Blake			Joseph Gordon-Levitt	
John Daggett			Ben Mendelsohn	
Peter Foley			Matthew Modine	
Byron Gilley			Brett Cullen	
Jen			Juno Temple	
Mark Jones			Daniel Sunjata	
Selina Kyle			Anne Hathaway	
Leonid Pavel			Alon Abutbul	
Father Reilly			Chris Ellis	
Philip Stryver			Burn Gorman	
Bill Wilson			Aidan Gillen	
Introduced in Batman: Gotham Knight
Crispus Allen				Gary Dourdan^{V}
Waylon Jones Killer Croc				Creature effects
Floyd Lawton Deadshot				Jim Meskimen^{V}

=== Shared universes ===
==== DC Extended Universe (2016–2023) ====
The DC Extended Universe (DCEU) is an American media franchise and shared universe centered on a series of superhero films starting in 2013 with Man of Steel and ending in 2023 with Aquaman and the Lost Kingdom. The DCEU introduced multiple pre-established supporting and antagonistic characters from the Batman mythos. The inspiration for the DCEU version of Batman is based on The Dark Knight Returns and A Death in the Family. Spin-off films based on Batman supporting characters such as Harley Quinn, the Birds of Prey and the Suicide Squad were released. The reception to the franchise and depiction of its characters/storylines has generally been mixed among critics and fans.

Characters	Batman v Superman: Dawn of Justice	Justice League Zack Snyder's Justice League	The Flash	Batgirl
Characters	2016	2017–2021	2023	Unreleased
Bruce Wayne Batman	Ben Affleck; Brandon Spink^{Y}	Ben Affleck	Ben Affleck^{U} George Clooney^{C}^{U}	
Bruce Wayne Batman (Note: This version of the character is that seen in the Tim Burton film series.)			Michael Keaton	Michael Keaton
Introduced in the DC Extended Universe
Ares		David Thewlis^{C}		
Carrie Ferris	Christina Wren	Christina Wren		
George "Digger" Harkness Captain Boomerang			Jai Courtney^{S}	
Hippolyta		Connie Nelson		
The Joker		Jared Leto^{E}		
J'onn J'onzz Calvin Swanwick / Martian Manhunter	Harry Lennix	Harry Lennix^{E}		
Kal-El / Clark Kent Superman	Henry Cavill	Henry Cavill	Henry Cavill^{S}	
Jonathan Kent	Kevin Costner	Kevin Costner^{E}^{A}^{V}		
Martha Kent	Diane Lane	Diane Lane		
Lois Lane	Amy Adams	Amy Adams		
Nuidis Vulko		Willem Dafoe^{E}		
Perry White	Laurence Fishburne			
Introduced in Batman v Superman: Dawn of Justice
Barry Allen The Flash	Ezra Miller^{C}	Ezra Miller	Ezra Miller; Ian Loh^{Y}	
Arthur Curry Aquaman	Jason Momoa^{C}	Jason Momoa	Jason Mamoa^{C}	
Doomsday	Robin Atkin Downes	Robin Atkin Downes^{A}^{E}^{S}		
June Finch	Holly Hunter			
Mercy Graves	Tao Okamoto			
Anatoli Knyazev	Callan Mulvey			
Lex Luthor	Jesse Eisenberg	Jesse Eisenberg		
Jimmy Olsen	Michael Cassidy^{C}			
Alfred Pennyworth	Jeremy Irons	Jeremy Irons	Jeremy Irons	
Diana Prince Wonder Woman	Gal Gadot	Gal Gadot	Gal Gadot^{C}	
Steppenwolf	CGI^{E}^{S}	Ciarán Hinds		
Silas Stone	Joe Morton^{C}	Joe Morton		
Victor Stone Cyborg	Ray Fisher^{C}	Ray Fisher		
Martha Wayne	Lauren Cohan^{C}			
Thomas Wayne	Jeffrey Dean Morgan^{C}			
Introduced in Justice League / Zack Snyder's Justice League
Crispus Allen		Kobna Holdbrook-Smith		
Henry Allen		Billy Crudup	Ron Livingston	
Artemis		Aurore Lauzeral^{C}		
Ryan Choi		Ryan Zheng^{E}		
Darkseid		Ray Porter^{E}		
DeSaad		Peter Guinness^{E}		
James Gordon		J. K. Simmons		J. K. Simmons
Granny Goodness		CGI^{E}^{S}		
Kilowog		CGI^{E}^{S}		
Mera		Amber Heard		
Elinore Stone		Karen Bryson^{E}		
Iris West		Kiersey Clemons^{E}	Kiersey Clemons	
Slade Wilson Deathstroke		Joe Manganiello		
Zeus		Sergi Constance^{C}		
Introduced in prior DC-media
Kal-El / Clark Kent Superman (Note: This version of the character is that seen in the Christopher Reeve film series.)			Christopher Reeve^{S}^{C}	
Kal-El / Clark Kent Superman (Note: This version of the character is that seen in the Adventures of Superman TV series.)			George Reeves^{S}^{C}	
Bruce Wayne Batman (Note: This version of the character is that seen in the 1960's Batman TV series.)			Adam West^{S}^{C}	
Kara Zoe-El / Linda Lee Supergirl			Helen Slater^{S}^{C}	
Introduced in The Flash
Barry Allen (Note: This version of the character appears in the Flashpoint timeline.)			Ezra Miller	
Barry Allen Dark Flash (Note: This corrupted Flashpoint version of the character.)			Ezra Miller	
Henry Allen			Ron Livingston	
Nora Allen			Maribel Verdú	
Nora Allen			Maribel Verdú	
Thomas Curry			Temuera Morrison^{C}	
Albert Desmond			Rudy Mancuso	
Albert Desmond			Rudy Mancuso	
Alberto Falcone			Luke Brandon Field	
Kal-El / Clark Kent Superman (Note: This version of the character is that seen in the unproduced Superman Lives film.)			Nicolas Cage^{S}^{C}	
Jay Garrick The Flash			CGI^{S}^{C}	
Patty Spivot			Saoirse-Monica Jackson	
Patty Spivot			Saoirse-Monica Jackson	
Faora-Ul			Antje Traue	
General Zod			Michael Shannon	
Kara Zor-El Supergirl			Sasha Calle	
Introduced in Batgirl
Anthony Bressi				Jacob Scipio
Ted Carson Firefly				Brendan Fraser
Barbara Gordon Batgirl				Leslie Grace
Killer Moth				N/A
Alysia Yeoh				Ivory Aquino

==== The Batman franchise (2022–present) ====
The Batman franchise is an American media franchise and shared universe created by filmmaker Matt Reeves and producer Dylan Clark. The franchise is centered on a series of superhero and crime films and television series focusing primarily on the Batman and the supporting characters from the Batman mythos. It started in 2022 another reboot of the Batman film series, with a Batman trilogy in development. The storylines, Batman: Year One, The Long Halloween, and Ego serve as inspiration.

Characters	The Batman	The Batman: Part II
Characters	2022	2028
Bruce Wayne Batman	Robert Pattinson; Oscar Novak^{Y}^{P}	Robert Pattinson
Introduced in The Batman
Annika	Hana Hrzic	
Mackenzie Bock	Con O'Neill	
Oswald "Oz" Cobb The Penguin	Colin Farrell	Colin Farrell
Gil Colson	Peter Sarsgaard	
Carmine Falcone	John Turturro	
James Gordon	Jeffrey Wright	Jeffrey Wright
The Joker	Barry Keoghan^{C} (Note: Credited as "Unseen Arkham Prisoner" in The Batman (2022))	
Kenzie	Peter McDonald	
Selina Kyle	Zoë Kravitz	
Salvatore Maroni	Uncredited extra^{C}	
Martinez	Gil Perez-Abraham	
Don Mitchell Jr.	Rupert Penry-Jones	
Edward Nashton The Riddler	Paul Dano; Joseph Walker^{Y}^{P}	
Alfred Pennyworth	Andy Serkis	Andy Serkis
Bella Reál	Jayme Lawson	
Pete Savage	Alex Ferns	
Martha Wayne	Stella Stocker^{P}	
Thomas Wayne	Luke Roberts^{C}	
Introduced in The Batman: Part II
Christopher Dent		Charles Dance
Gilda Dent		Scarlett Johansson
Harvey Dent		Sebastian Stan

==== DC Universe (2024–present) ====
The DC Universe (DCU) is an American media franchise and shared universe centered on a series of superhero films and television series based on characters that appear in American comic books published by DC Comics. It serves as the successor to the DC Extended Universe (DCEU). The story of the DCU is divided into chapters, starting with "Gods and Monsters" which began in 2024 with the animated series Creature Commandos. DC Studios co-Chairmen and co-CEOs, James Gunn and Peter Safran considered the chapter's first film Superman (2025), to be the true beginning of the DCU.

=== Spin-off films ===
Characters	Catwoman	DC Extended Universe			Joker films		DC Universe
Characters	Catwoman	Suicide Squad	Birds of Prey	The Suicide Squad	Joker	Joker: Folie à Deux	Clayface
Characters	2004	2016	2020	2021	2019	2024	2026
Introduced in Catwoman
George Hedare	Lambert Wilson						
Laurel Hedare	Sharon Stone						
Selina Kyle	Michelle Pfeiffer^{P}						
Detective Tom Lone	Benjamin Bratt						
Patience Phillips Catwoman	Halle Berry						
Ophelia Powers	Frances Conroy						
Sally	Alex Borstein						
Introduced in the DC Extended Universe
Maria Bertinelli			Charlene Amoia				
Helena Bertinelli Huntress			Mary Elizabeth Winstead; Ella Mika^{Y}				
Gunter Braun Javelin				Flula Borg			
Cassandra Cain			Ella Jay Basco				
Calendar Man				Sean Gunn^{C}			
Rick Flag		Joel Kinnaman		Joel Kinnaman			
Jonny Frost		Jim Parrack					
George Harkness Captain Boomerang		Jai Courtney	Jai Courtney^{P}				
Incubus		Alain Chanoine					
Joker		Jared Leto	John Goth (stand-in)				
Waylon Jones Killer Croc		Adewale Akinnuoye-Agbaje					
Dinah Lance Black Canary			Jurnee Smollett				
Floyd Lawton Deadshot		Will Smith					
Zoe Lawton		Shailyn Pierre-Dixon					
Renee Montoya			Rosie Perez				
June Moone Enchantress		Cara Delevingne					
Harleen Quinzel Harley Quinn		Margot Robbie	Margot Robbie	Margot Robbie			
Chato Santana El Diablo		Jay Hernandez					
Roman Sionis Black Mask			Ewan McGregor				
Amanda Waller		Viola Davis		Viola Davis			
Christopher Weiss Slipknot		Adam Beach					
Tatsu Yamashiro Katana		Karen Fukuhara					
Victor Zsasz			Chris Messina				
Introduced in the Joker films
Arkham inmate						Connor Storrie	
Detective Burke					Bill Camp		
Joe Chill					Uncredited extra^{C}		
Harvey Dent						Harry Lawtey	
Sophie Dumond					Zazie Beetz	Zazie Beetz	
Arthur Fleck Joker					Joaquin Phoenix	Joaquin Phoenix	
Penny Fleck					Frances Conroy; Hannah Gross^{C}^{Y}		
Murray Franklin					Robert De Niro	Robert De Niro^{A}	
Detective Garrity					Shea Whigham		
Paddy Meyers						Steve Coogan	
Alfred Pennyworth					Douglas Hodge		
Gary Puddles					Leigh Gill	Leigh Gill	
Harleen "Lee" Quinzel						Lady Gaga	
Randall					Glenn Fleshler		
Maryanne Stewart						Catherine Keener	
Jackie Sullivan						Brendan Gleeson	
Gene Ufland					Marc Maron		
Bruce Wayne					Dante Pereira-Olson		
Martha Wayne					Carrie Louise Putrello		
Thomas Wayne					Brett Cullen		
Introduced in Clayface
Matt Hagen Clayface							Tom Rhys Harries

== Feature-length animated films ==
=== DC Animated Universe (1993–2019) ===
The DC Animated Universe (DCAU) is a shared universe centered on a group of animated television series based on DC Comics characters and stories. It initially began with Batman: The Animated Series in 1992 and ended with Justice League Unlimited in 2006. Five feature films, four primarily focusing on Batman and his supporting characters are also in the continuity that continued to be released years later.

Character	DC Animated Universe	Batman: Mask of the Phantasm	Batman & Mr. Freeze: SubZero	Batman Beyond: Return of the Joker	Batman: Mystery of the Batwoman	Batman and Harley Quinn
Character	1992–2006	1993	1998	2000	2003	2017
Bruce Wayne Batman	Kevin Conroy	Kevin Conroy	Kevin Conroy	Kevin Conroy	Kevin Conroy	Kevin Conroy
Terry McGinnis Batman	Will Friedle			Will Friedle		
Introduced in the DC Animated Universe
Ace the Bat-Hound	Frank Welker			Frank Welker		
Bane	Henry Silva				Héctor Elizondo	
Harvey Bullock	Robert Costanzo	Robert Costanzo	Robert Costanzo		Robert Costanzo	
Michael J. Carter Booster Gold	Tom Everett Scott					Bruce Timm^{C}
Oswald Cobblepot The Penguin	Paul Williams				David Ogden Stiers	
Tim Drake Robin	Mathew Valencia			Dean Stockwell Mathew Valencia^{Y}	Eli Marienthal	
Victor Fries Mister Freeze	Michael Ansara		Michael Ansara			
Summer Gleeson	Mari Devon		Mari Devon			
Barbara Gordon Batgirl	Mary Kay Bergman Tara Strong		Mary Kay Bergman	Angie Harmon Tara Strong^{Y}	Tara Strong	
Jim Gordon	Bob Hastings	Bob Hastings	Bob Hastings		Bob Hastings	
Richard "Dick" Grayson Robin / Nightwing	Loren Lester		Loren Lester			Loren Lester
Pamela Isley Poison Ivy	Diane Pershing					Paget Brewster
The Joker	Mark Hamill	Mark Hamill		Mark Hamill		
Renee Montoya	Liane Schirmer		Liane Schirmer			
Alfred Pennyworth	Efrem Zimbalist Jr.	Efrem Zimbalist Jr.	Efrem Zimbalist Jr.		Efrem Zimbalist Jr.	
Harleen Quinzel Harley Quinn	Arleen Sorkin			Arleen Sorkin		Melissa Rauch
Rupert Thorne	John Vernon			John Vernon		
Veronica Vreeland	Marilu Henner		Marilu Henner			
Introduced in Batman: Mask of the Phantasm
Andrea Beaumont Phantasm		Dana Delany Stacy Keach				
Carl Beaumont		Stacy Keach				
Buzz Bronski		John P. Ryan				
Arthur Reeves		Hart Bochner				
Charles "Chuckie" Sol		Dick Miller				
Salvatore Valestra		Abe Vigoda				
Introduced in Batman & Mr. Freeze: SubZero
Dean Arbagast			Dean Jones			
Dr. Gregory Belson			George Dzundza			
Hotchka and Shaka			Frank Welker			
Koonak			Rahi Azizi			
Introduced in Batman Beyond: Return of the Joker
Bonk				Henry Rollins		
Chucko				Donald Patrick Harvey		
Delia and Deidre Dennis Dee Dee				Melissa Joan Hart		
Ghoul				Michael Rosenbaum		
Jordan Pryce				Mark Hamill		
Woof the Hyena-Man				Frank Welker		
Introduced in Batman: Mystery of the Batwoman
Sonia Alcana Batwoman					Elisa Gabrielli Kyra Sedgwick	
Roxanne Ballantine Batwoman					Kelly Ripa Kyra Sedgwick	
Kathy Duquesne Batwoman					Kimberly Brooks Kyra Sedgwick	
Carlton Duquesne					Kevin Michael Richardson	
Introduced in Batman and Harley Quinn
Dr. Harold Goldblum						Rob Paulsen
Alec Holland Swamp Thing						John DiMaggio
Bobby Liebowitz						Trevor Devall
Sarge Steel						John DiMaggio
Wesley						Eric Bauza
Jason Woodrue Floronic Man						Kevin Michael Richardson

=== Direct-to-DVD films ===
Character
Character	The Batman	Batman Unlimited			Batman: The Brave and the Bold	Batman vs. Teenage Mutant Ninja Turtles	Batman Ninja		Merry Little Batman
Character	The Batman vs Dracula	Batman Unlimited: Animal Instincts	Batman Unlimited Monster Mayhem	Batman Unlimited: Mechs vs. Mutants	Scooby-Doo! & Batman: The Brave and the Bold	Batman vs. Teenage Mutant Ninja Turtles	Batman Ninja	Batman Ninja vs. Yakuza League	Merry Little Batman
Character	2005	2015	2015	2016	2018	2018	2018	2025	2023
Bruce Wayne Batman	Rino Romano	Roger Craig Smith	Roger Craig Smith	Roger Craig Smith	Diedrich Bader	Troy Baker	Koichi Yamadera Roger Craig Smith	Koichi Yamadera Roger Craig Smith	Luke Wilson
Bane				Carlos Alazraqui		Carlos Alazraqui	Kenta Miyake		Chris Sullivan
Oswald Cobblepot Penguin	Tom Kenny	Dana Snyder			Tom Kenny	Tom Kenny	Chō Tom Kenny		Brian George
Jonathan Crane Scarecrow			Brian T. Delaney		No voice actor	Jim Meskimen			Fred Tatasciore
Count Dracula	Peter Stormare								
Victor Fries Mister Freeze				Oded Fehr	No voice actor	John DiMaggio			Dolph Adomian
Jim Gordon		Richard Epcar	Richard Epcar	Richard Epcar		Jim Meskimen		Masaki Terasoma	Reid Scott
Pamela Isley Poison Ivy					Tara Strong	Tara Strong			Therese McLaughlin
Joker	Kevin Michael Richardson		Troy Baker	Troy Baker	Jeff Bennett	Troy Baker	Wataru Takagi Tony Hale	Wataru Takagi Tony Hale	David Hornsby
Alfred Pennyworth	Alastair Duncan	Alastair Duncan	Alastair Duncan	Alastair Duncan		Brian George	Hōchū Ōtsuka Adam Croasdell	Hōchū Ōtsuka Adam Croasdell	James Cromwell
Vicki Vale	Tara Strong								Cynthia McWilliams
Damian Wayne Robin				Lucien Dodge		Ben Giroux	Yuki Kaji Yuri Lowenthal	Yuki Kaji Yuri Lowenthal	Yonas Kibreab

=== DC Universe Animated Original Movies ===
The DC Universe Animated Original Movies are a series of American direct-to-video superhero animated standalone films based on DC Comics characters and stories. Assault on Arkham (2014) is set in the continuity of the Batman: Arkham video game franchise. The Batman storylines adapted were Superman/Batman, The Dark Knight Returns, The Doom That Came to Gotham, Gotham by Gaslight, The Killing Joke, Under the Hood and Year One.

==== 2000s–2010s films ====
Characters	Superman/Batman: Public Enemies	Batman: Under the Red Hood	Superman/Batman: Apocalypse	Batman: Year One	Batman: The Dark Knight Returns	Batman: Assault on Arkham	Batman: The Killing Joke	Batman: Gotham by Gaslight
Characters	2009	2010	2010	2011	2012–2013	2014	2016	2018
Bruce Wayne Batman	Kevin Conroy	Bruce Greenwood	Kevin Conroy	Ben McKenzie	Peter Weller	Kevin Conroy	Kevin Conroy	Bruce Greenwood
Kal-El / Clark Kent Superman	Tim Daly		Tim Daly		Mark Valley			
Jim Gordon		No voice actor		Bryan Cranston	David Selby	Chris Cox	Ray Wise	Scott Patterson
Joker		John DiMaggio			Michael Emerson	Troy Baker	Mark Hamill	
Selina Kyle Catwoman				Eliza Dushku	Tress MacNeille			Jennifer Carpenter
Alfred Pennyworth	Alan Oppenheimer	Jim Piddock		Jeff Bennett	Michael Jackson	Martin Jarvis	Brian George	Anthony Head

==== 2020s films ====
Characters	Batman: Death in the Family	Batman: Soul of the Dragon	Catwoman: Hunted	Batman and Superman: Battle of the Super Sons	Batman: The Doom That Came to Gotham	Batman: Knightfall
Characters	2020	2021	2022	2022	2023	TBA
Bruce Wayne Batman	Bruce Greenwood	David Giuntoli		Troy Baker	David Giuntoli; Jason Marsden^{Y}	Anson Mount

=== DC Animated Movie Universe (2013–2024) ===
The DC Animated Movie Universe (DCAMU) is an American media franchise and shared universe centered on a series of superhero films, that feature plot elements inspired by The New 52 continuity. It is a part of the DC Universe Animated Original Movies line of animated films. The storylines loosely adapted are Batman and Son, Night of the Owls, Hush and The Long Halloween.

Character	Son of Batman	Nightwing and Robin	Batman vs. Robin	Batman: Bad Blood	Batman: Hush	Batman: The Long Halloween
Character	2014	2015	2015	2016	2019	2021
Bruce Wayne Batman	Jason O'Mara	Jason O'Mara^{A}^{C}^{V}	Jason O'Mara; Griffin Gluck^{Y}	Jason O'Mara	Jason O'Mara	Jensen Ackles; Zach Callison^{Y}
Introduced in the DC Animated Movie Universe
Barry Allen The Flash						No voice actor^{C}
Solomon Grundy						Fred Tatasciore
Basil Karlo Clayface					Adam Gifford	
Kal-El / Clark Kent Superman					Jerry O'Connell	
Lois Lane					Rebecca Romijn	
Lex Luthor					Rainn Wilson	
Harleen Quinzel Harley Quinn					Hynden Walch	
Amanda Waller					Vanessa Williams	
Martha Wayne			No voice actor^{C}			No voice actor^{C}
Thomas Wayne			Kevin Conroy^{C}			Robin Atkin Downes^{C}
Slade Wilson Deathstroke	Thomas Gibson					
Introduced in Son of Batman
Ra's al Ghul	Giancarlo Esposito					
Talia al Ghul	Morena Baccarin			Morena Baccarin		
Bane	John Smith					
Oswald Cobblepot Penguin	Robbie Patterson			No voice actor^{C}	No voice actor^{C}	David Dastmalchian
Harvey Dent Two-Face	No voice actor^{C}				No voice actor^{C}	Josh Duhamel
James Gordon	Bruce Thomas			Bruce Thomas	Bruce Thomas	Billy Burke
Richard "Dick" Grayson Nightwing / Batman II	Sean Maher	No voice actor	Sean Mahner	Sean Mahner	Sean Mahner	
Joker	Dee Bradley Baker^{C}				Jason Spisak	Troy Baker
Waylon Jones Killer Croc	Fred Tatasciore					
Francine Langstrom	Diane Michelle					
Kirk Langstrom	Xander Berkeley					
Rebecca Langstrom	Kari Wahlgren					
Alfred Pennyworth	David McCallum		David McCallum	James Garrett	James Garrett	Alastair Duncan
Ubu	Bruce Thomas					
Damian Wayne Robin	Stuart Allan	No voice actor	Stuart Allan	Stuart Allan	Stuart Allen^{C}	
Introduced in Nightwing and Robin
Jonathan Crane Scarecrow		Michael Rosenbaum			Chris Cox	Robin Atkin Downes
Talon		No voice actor^{C}	Jeremy Sisto			
Introduced in Batman vs. Robin
Court of Owls Grandmaster			Robin Atkin Downes			
Court of Owls Lieutenant			Troy Baker			
Kate Kane Batwoman			No voice actor^{C}	Yvonne Strahovski		
Anton Schott Dollmaker			"Weird Al" Yankovic			
Samantha Vanaver			Grey DeLisle			
Introduced in Batman: Bad Blood
Black Mask				Steven Blum		
Blockbuster				John DiMaggio		
Electrocutioner				Robin Atkin Downes		
Firefly				Steven Blum		
Lucius Fox				Ernie Hudson		
Luke Fox Batwing				Gaius Charles		
Barbara Gordon Batgirl				No voice actor^{C}	Peyton R. List	N/A
Hellhound				Matthew Mercer		
Heretic				Travis Willingham		
Colonel Jacob Kane				Geoff Pierson		
Killer Moth				Jason Spisak		
Kori				Kari Wahlgren^{V}^{C}		
Noah Kuttler Calculator				Jason Spisak		
Renee Montoya				Vanessa Marshall		Alyssa Diaz
Chuckie Sol				Matthew Mercer		
Jervis Tetch Mad Hatter				Robin Atkin Downes		John DiMaggio
Tusk				John DiMaggio		
Introduced in Batman: Hush
Thomas Elliot					Maury Sterling	
Victor Fries Mister Freeze					No voice actor^{C}	
Pamela Isley Poison Ivy					Peyton List	Katee Sackhoff
Selina Kyle Catwoman					Jennifer Morrison	Naya Rivera
Lady Shiva					Sachie Alessio	
Edward Nygma The Riddler / Hush					Geoffrey Arend	
Introduced in Batman: The Long Halloween
Julian Day Calendar Man						David Dastmalchian
Gilda Dent						Julie Nathanson
Alberto Falcone						Jack Quaid
Carmine Falcone						Titus Welliver
Sofia Falcone						Laila Berzins
Barbara Eileen Gordon						Amy Landecker
Sal Maroni						Jim Pirri
Oliver Queen Green Arrow						No voice actor^{C}
Carla Viti						Amy Landecker

== Lego-animated films ==
=== Lego DC Comics Super Heroes film series ===
Character	Lego DC Comics Super Heroes film series									
Character	Lego Batman: The Movie – DC Super Heroes Unite	Lego DC Comics: Batman Be-Leaguered	Justice League vs. Bizarro League	Justice League: Attack of the Legion of Doom	Justice League: Cosmic Clash	Justice League: Gotham City Breakout	The Flash	Aquaman: Rage of Atlantis	Lego DC Batman: Family Matters	Lego DC: Shazam!: Magic and Monsters
Bruce Wayne Batman	Troy Baker	Troy Baker	Troy Baker	Troy Baker	Troy Baker	Troy Baker	Troy Baker	Troy Baker	Troy Baker	Troy Baker
Kal-El / Clark Kent Superman	Travis Willingham	Nolan North	Nolan North	Nolan North	Nolan North	Nolan North	Nolan North	Nolan North		Nolan North
Barry Allen The Flash	Charlie Schlatter	James Arnold Taylor	James Arnold Taylor	James Arnold Taylor	James Arnold Taylor		James Arnold Taylor			James Arnold Taylor
Wonder Woman	Laura Bailey	Grey DeLisle	Kari Wahlgren	Grey Griffin	Grey Griffin	Grey Griffin	Grey Griffin	Grey Griffin		Grey Griffin
Cyborg	Brian Bloom	Brian Bloom	Khary Payton	Khary Payton	Khary Payton	Khary Payton	Khary Payton	Khary Payton		
Lex Luthor	Clancy Brown	John DiMaggio	John DiMaggio	John DiMaggio						
The Joker	Christopher Corey Smith	John DiMaggio				Jason Spisak	Jason Spisak			
Richard "Dick" Grayson Robin / Nightwing	Charlie Schlatter					Will Friedle			Will Friedel	
Hal Jordan Green Lantern	Cam Clarke									
Harleen Quinzel Harley Quinn	Laura Bailey					Tara Strong				
Selina Kyle Catwoman	Katherine Von Till									
Batcomputer	Katherine Von Till									
Alfred Pennyworth		Nolan North	Nolan North						Nolan North	Nolan North
Aquaman		Dee Bradley Baker					Dee Bradley Baker	Dee Bradley Baker		

=== The Lego Movie film series (2014–2019) ===
Characters	The Lego Movie	The Lego Batman Movie	The Lego Movie 2: The Second Part
Characters	2014	2017	2019
Bruce Wayne Batman	Will Arnett	Will Arnett	Will Arnett
Introduced in The Lego Movie
Kal-El / Clark Kent Superman	Channing Tatum	Channing Tatum	Channing Tatum
Hal Jordan Green Lantern	Jonah Hill	Jonah Hill	Jonah Hill
Wonder Woman	Cobie Smulders		Cobie Smulders
Introduced in The Lego Batman Movie
Barry Allen The Flash		Adam DeVine	
Batcomputer		Siri	
Richard "Dick" Grayson Robin		Michael Cera	
The Joker		Zach Galifianakis	
Selina Kyle Catwoman		Zoë Kravitz	
Alfred Pennyworth		Ralph Fiennes	Ralph Fiennes
Harleen Quinzel Harley Quinn		Jenny Slate	Margot Rubin
Introduced in The Lego Movie 2: The Second Part
Aquaman			Jason Momoa
Lex Luthor			Ike Barinholtz

== See also ==
- Batman franchise media
- List of Spider-Man film cast members
