= Marietta Canty =

American stage and film actress (1905–1986)

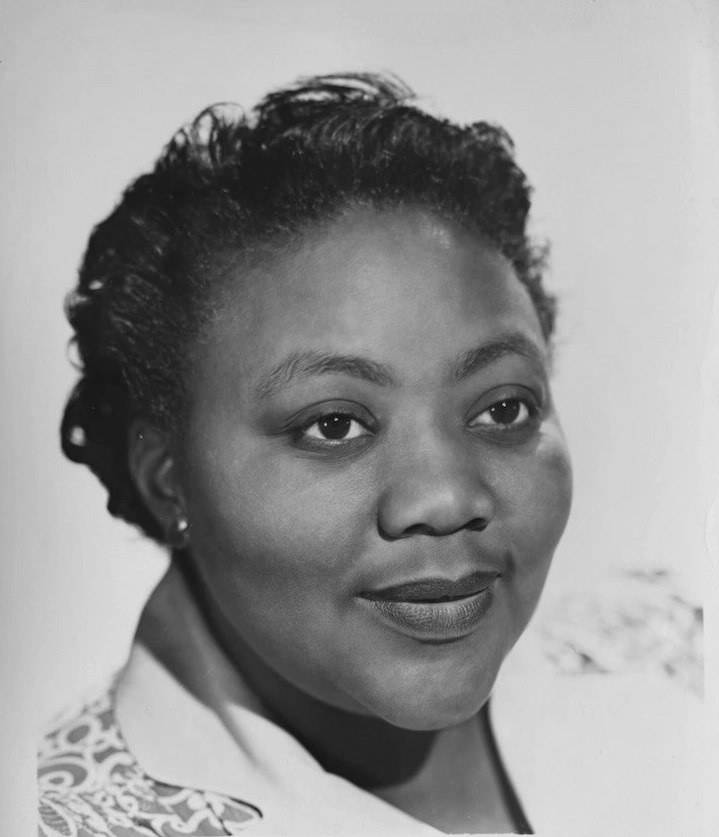
- Born: September 30, 1905; Hartford, Connecticut, U.S.
- Died: July 9, 1986 (aged 80); Hartford, Connecticut, U.S.
- Occupation: Actress
- Years active: 1933–1955

Marietta Canty (September 30, 1905 – July 9, 1986) was an American actress, community activist and recipient of numerous humanitarian awards.

== Early days ==
Canty was born in Hartford, Connecticut, the daughter of Mary and Henry Canty, who attended the Metropolitan African Methodist Episcopal Zion Church and actively canvassed for the Republican Party.

== Acting career ==
Canty first appeared on Broadway in 1933. She also appeared in 40 films between 1940 and 1955, mostly in supporting roles and bit parts. Like many African-American actresses of her generation, she often played family maids. Two of her first roles were in the films The Lady is Willing (1942) and The Spoilers (1942), both with Marlene Dietrich in the leading role. Canty is perhaps best known as Delilah, Spencer Tracy's housemaid, in the comedy Father of the Bride (1950) and in its sequel Father's Little Dividend (1951). Canty retired from film acting in 1955; her last role in Hollywood was Rebel Without a Cause starring James Dean, where she had a memorable part as Sal Mineo's family maid.

== Personal life ==
Canty was highly socially active in her community. She ran for a seat on the Hartford City Council in the early 1960s.

== Legacy ==
Canty’s awards include:

- the Humanitarian Award, Hartford Section of National Council of Women
- the certificate of Service and Award Recognition by the American Red Cross.
- the Marietta Canty House, a circa 1897 Queen Anne style house in Hartford, Connecticut, bought by her parents, Mary and Henry Canty in 1930, is named in her honor.

== Filmography ==
Year	Title	Role	Notes
1940	Boom Town	Karen's Maid	Uncredited
1942	The Lady is Waiting	Mary Lou	
1942	The Spoilers	Idabelle	
1942	Not a Ladies' Man	Lucy	
1942	The Magnificent Dope	Jenny	
1942	Silver Queen	Ruby	
1942	Johnny Doughboy	Sweetheart	Uncredited
1943	Three Hearts for Julia	Mattie, Julia's Maid	
1943	Mexican Spitfire's Blessed Event	Verbena (Carmelita's Maid)	
1944	Lady in the Dark	Martha	
1944	The Heavenly Body	Pearl	
1944	Goin' to Town	Camellia	
1944	Irish Eyes Are Smiling	Phoebe the Ladies Room Maid	Uncredited
1944	Sunday Dinner for a Soldier	Samanthy	Uncredited
1944	Lake Placid Serenade	Priscilla	Uncredited
1946	Johnny Comes Flying Home	Jennie	Uncredited
1946	The Searching Wind	Sophronia, the Maid	
1946	Home Sweet Homicide	Cherrington Housekeeper	Uncredited
1947	The Sea of Grass	Rachael	Uncredited
1947	Dear Ruth	Dora	
1947	The Crimson Key	Petunia	Uncredited
1948	Best Man Wins	Hester	
1948	Words and Music	Mary	Uncredited
1949	Mother Is a Freshman	Beulah	Uncredited
1949	Chicago Deadline	Hazel	
1949	Dear Wife	Dora	
1949	My Foolish Heart	Grace	
1950	Father of the Bride	Delilah	
1950	Bright Leaf	Queenie - Sonia's Maid	Uncredited
1950	The Toast of New Orleans	Angelique, Suzette's Maid	Uncredited
1951	Belle Le Grand	Daisy	
1951	Valentino	Tilly - Joan's Maid	Uncredited
1951	Father's Little Dividend	Delilah	
1951	A Streetcar Named Desire	Giggling Woman with Eunice	Uncredited
1952	Dreamboat	Lavinia	Uncredited
1952	The Bad and the Beautiful	Ida	Uncredited
1953	The I Don't Care Girl	Dolly	Uncredited
1955	A Man Called Peter	Emma	Uncredited
1955	Rebel Without a Cause	Crawford Family Maid	(final film role)
