= Not a Ladies' Man =

1942 film

- Theatrical release poster
- Directed by: Lew Landers
- Screenplay by: Rian James
- Based on: Just Another Dame by Robert Hyde
- Produced by: Leon Barsha
- Starring: Paul Kelly; Fay Wray; Douglas Croft; Ruth Lee; Lawrence Dixon; Marietta Canty
- Cinematography: John Stumar
- Edited by: Mel Thorsen
- Production company: Columbia Pictures
- Distributed by: Columbia Pictures
- Release date: May 14, 1942
- Running time: 60 minutes
- Country: United States
- Language: English

Not a Ladies' Man is a 1942 American drama film directed by Lew Landers and written by Rian James. The film stars Paul Kelly, Fay Wray, Douglas Croft, Ruth Lee, Lawrence Dixon and Marietta Canty. The film was released on May 14, 1942, by Columbia Pictures.

== Plot ==
When district attorney Robert Bruce's wife leaves him, his son, Bill, begins to have emotional problems, which worries his teacher, Pat Hunter. Bill briefly runs away, and after getting some friendly advice from a hobo, decides to find his father a new wife. Bill's choices leave much to be desired, however. When Pat accidentally runs into Robert's car, romance ensues. Robert learns that his ex-wife has married a local racketeer, and tries to postpone the thug's trial in an attempt to spare his son the shame of having his mother wed to a gangster. This only causes more problems. Bill and Pat help Robert realize that the truth must come out, even if it hurts. Robert proposes to Pat.

== Cast ==
- Paul Kelly as Robert Bruce
- Fay Wray as Hester Hunter
- Douglas Croft as Bill Bruce
- Ruth Lee as Jennie Purcell
- Lawrence Dixon as Pudge Roberts
- Marietta Canty as Lucy
- Don Beddoe as 'Professor Bigfoot' Johnson
- Eileen O'Hearn as Margaret Vance
- Jean Inness as Miss Morton
- Louise Allbritton as Ethel Burlridge
- William Wright as John Keen
