= Killer McCoy =

1947 American film about a boxer directed by Roy Rowland

- Directed by: Roy Rowland
- Screenplay by: Frederick Hazlitt Brennan
- Story by: George Bruce; Thomas Lennon; George Oppenheimer
- Produced by: Sam Zimbalist
- Starring: Mickey Rooney; Brian Donlevy; Ann Blyth
- Cinematography: Joseph Ruttenberg
- Edited by: Ralph E. Winters
- Music by: David Snell
- Production company: Metro-Goldwyn-Mayer
- Distributed by: Loew's Inc.
- Release date: December 1947
- Running time: 104 minutes
- Country: United States
- Language: English
- Budget: $1,402,000
- Box office: $3,191,000

Killer McCoy is a 1947 American sports drama film about a boxer starring Mickey Rooney. It is a remake of The Crowd Roars (1938). The picture was directed by Roy Rowland with a supporting cast featuring Brian Donlevy, Ann Blyth, James Dunn, Tom Tully, and Sam Levene.

== Plot ==
Tommy McCoy is a tough city boy, who makes money as a pool hustler and street newsboy, while his father, a former song-and-dance man, wastes the family's money on drink while waiting for vaudeville to come back. Performing with his father at a charity amateur boxing event sponsored by local priest Father Ryan, Tommy sees a chance to get even with a rival newsboy and climbs into the ring. His success catches the attention of champion boxer Johnny Martin and leads to a slow but steady climb in professional boxing as Tommy puts on weight and muscle and qualifies for lightweight matches.

Eventually, Tommy is matched in a fight against Martin, who is now unhealthy and out of shape after several years out of the ring. Tommy is reluctant to fight and holds back his more powerful right hand in the contest, but when he knocks Martin out with his left hand, it leads to Martin's death. Though tried for manslaughter, Tommy is acquitted but earns the nickname "Killer." Bookmaker Jim Caighn sees an opportunity and buys Tommy's contract from his father, who is heavily in debt to Caighn. The gambler directs Tommy to hold back his right hand until late in each match. The ruse persuades other gamblers that Tommy has little chance of winning, increasing the odds for Caighn, who supports Tommy and his father in secret..

While training at a Connecticut estate, Tommy meets Sheila Carson, who turns out to be Caighn's daughter, apparently unaware of her supposedly respectable father's gambling activities under a different name. Ignoring Caighn/Carson's warnings, Tommy continues to see the young woman, who is attracted to him despite the brutality of his sport. Tommy talks with her about his plans to leave boxing behind, perhaps to become a sports writer. Eventually Cecil Walsh, one of Caighn's major "suckers" who has been betting against Tommy in matches, discovers that Tommy works for Caighn and that Sheila is the bookie's daughter. Kidnapping Sheila and Tommy's father, Walsh forces Tommy to agree to lose in the eighth round of an upcoming championship fight, on which Walsh has placed a large bet.

Tommy goes through with the fight, allowing himself to be beaten in round after round. In the meantime, Tommy's father manages to free himself and Sheila from the kidnappers, but only she manages to escape when Tommy's father and the gangsters shoot each other. Sheila races to the boxing arena, where she is confronted by her father. Just before the next round, though, Caighn has been persuaded by Sheila and lets Tommy know that Sheila is now safe. Tommy goes into the next round and wins. At the end of the match, he announces that he is giving up boxing and reunites with Sheila, now with her father's blessing.

== Cast ==
- Mickey Rooney as Tommy McCoy / Killer McCoy
- Brian Donlevy as Jim Caighn
- Ann Blyth as Sheila Carrson
- James Dunn as Brian McCoy
- Tom Tully as Cecil Y. Walsh
- Sam Levene as Happy
- Walter Sande as Bill Thorne
- Mickey Knox as Johnny Martin
- James Bell as Father Patrick Ryan
- Gloria Holden as Mrs. Laura McCoy
- Eve March as Mrs. Martin
- June Storey as Arlene – Waitress
- Douglas Croft as Danny Burns, Newsboy
- Bob Steele as Sailor Graves
- David Clarke as Pete Mariola

== Production ==
MGM announced the film in March 1947. Mickey Rooney had intended to appear in a biopic of jockey Tod Sloan but when that was postponed MGM put him in this. Cyril Hume wrote the script and Sam Zimbalist was assigned to produce. It was a conscious decision on MGM's part to try Rooney in a different sort of role. Elizabeth Taylor was announced as his costar. In May Frederick Hazlitt Brennan signed to write the script. By June, Taylor had been replaced by Ann Blyth due to script revisions that changed the age of her character.

== Reception ==
=== Box office ===
The film was a hit, earning $2,201,000 in the US and Canada and $990,000 elsewhere making a profit of $768,000.
