= Lapsis =

2020 film by Noah Hutton

- Film poster
- Directed by: Noah Hutton
- Written by: Noah Hutton
- Produced by: Jesse Miller; Joseph Varca; Taylor Hess
- Starring: Dean Imperial; Madeline Wise; Babe Howard; Dora Madison; Ivory Aquino; Frank Wood; James McDaniel; Arliss Howard
- Cinematography: Mike Gomes
- Edited by: Noah Hutton
- Music by: Noah Hutton
- Production companies: Couple 3 Films; Purple & Gold Productions
- Distributed by: Film Movement
- Release dates: March 16, 2020 (SXSW); February 12, 2021 (United States)
- Running time: 108 minutes
- Country: United States
- Language: English

Lapsis is a 2020 American dystopian science fiction film written, directed, edited, and scored by Noah Hutton. It stars Dean Imperial as a delivery man who turns to quantum cabling, a strange new corner of the gig economy. The film also stars Madeline Wise, Babe Howard, Dora Madison, Ivory Aquino, Frank Wood, James McDaniel, and Arliss Howard.

The film had its world premiere at South by Southwest on March 16, 2020, and was screened at the Bucheon International Fantastic Film Festival on July 11, 2020, where it won the Jury's Choice Award. It was released in the United States on February 12, 2021, by Film Movement. It received positive reviews from critics, while Hutton was nominated for Best First Screenplay at the 36th Independent Spirit Awards.

== Plot ==
In a parallel present, delivery man Ray Tincelli is struggling to support himself and his ailing younger brother. After a series of two-bit hustles and unsuccessful swindles, Ray takes a job in a strange new realm of the gig economy: trekking deep into the forest, pulling cable over miles of terrain to connect large, metal cubes that link together the new quantum trading market. As he is pulled deeper into the zone, he encounters growing hostility and the threat of robot cablers, and must choose to either help his fellow workers or to get rich and get out.

== Cast ==
- Dean Imperial as Ray
- Babe Howard as Jamie
- Madeline Wise as Anna
- Dora Madison as Erica
- Ivory Aquino as Jo
- Frank Wood as John
- James McDaniel as Felix
- Arliss Howard as Dr. Jedediah Mangold
- Portia as Officer Peachey
- Pooya Mohseni as Noori Capahardi
- Dru Johnston as Smith
- Kim Blacklock as Maureen
- Steve Rasetta as Trey
- Joy Sudduth as Technician
- Richard Cooper as Tuber
- Michiko Sasaki as Nancy Connor
- Alex Breaux as Alpine
- Malin Barr as Interviewee Jen
- Daniella DeCaro as Protestor Sierra
- Hilary Greer as Nellie Clyder
- Jeena Yi as Uncanny Ali

== Production ==
The production met SAG-AFTRA's diversity incentive by casting two transgender actors, Aquino and Mohseni, playing cisgender characters in major supporting roles. Principal photography lasted 26 days, with 75% of the film taking place in the forest.

== Release ==
Lapsis had its world premiere at the SXSW Film Festival on March 16, 2020, and was then screened at several film festivals around the world. In August 2020, Film Movement acquired North American distribution rights to the film. It was released in virtual cinemas and on demand and digital platforms in the United States on February 12, 2021. Signature Entertainment released the film on digital platforms in the United Kingdom on July 5, 2021.

== Reception ==
=== Critical response ===
On the review aggregator website Rotten Tomatoes, 95% of 58 critics' reviews are positive, with an average rating of 7.2/10. The website's consensus reads: "Lapsis binds economic anxiety to an unsettling sci-fi story set in the not-too-distant future, with smartly inventive results." Metacritic, which uses a weighted average, assigned the film a score of 74 out of 100, based on 5 critics, indicating "generally favorable" reviews.

Dennis Harvey of Variety described the film as "a clever indie political satire of gig-worker economics" and commented, "As the performers maintain a relative poker face, the film's satire is largely a matter of tone and implication. Not the least contributor in that regard is Hutton's own original score, by turns antic and otherworldly."

Jeannette Catsoulis of The New York Times stated, "The narrative eventually loses steam, but the movie's politics remain as low-key as its acting and as basic as its special effects. Lapsis isn't a polemic, it's a caricature, and all the more likable for having its claws sheathed in velvet."

Robert Abele of the Los Angeles Times opined, "Lapsis is its own cleverly deadpan curio, with Hutton somehow creating a playground in which Imperial's naturalistic Gandolfini-esque appeal, outspoken critiques of capitalism, and eccentrically menacing toy-like robots can all coexist without too much imagination strain."

Kate Erbland of IndieWire gave the film a grade of "B+" and remarked, "Hutton might not entirely stick the landing, but the pleasures of Lapsis extend beyond tidy conclusions and easy answers. Imperial, Wise, and the rest of a game cast never wink at what's happening around them, finding humor and revelations in equal measure."

John DeFore of The Hollywood Reporter wrote, "Payment is precarious in a system that's obviously inspired by today's real gig-work arena, allowing Hutton to champion the underclass without seeming strident. Modest but engaging, the film avoids the sterile, placeless vibe that sometimes characterizes speculative tales like this."

Matt Zoller Seitz of RogerEbert.com gave the film 3 out of 4 stars and noted, "Lapsis has done such an outstanding job of cultivating a Kafka-eque or Brazil-like sense of grinding yet hilarious despair that it feels weird and false when we're not in that headspace any longer."

Phil Hoad of The Guardian gave the film 3 out of 5 stars and called it a "sensitive but flawed sci-fi comic dystopia." Hoad also stated, "Lapsis is admirably fired-up film-making, and certainly original, but – like many revolutions – gets bogged down as it fusses over the details."

=== Accolades ===
Year	Award	Category	Nominee	Result	Ref.
2021	36th Independent Spirit Awards	Best First Screenplay	Noah Hutton	Nominated	
2022	28th Chlotrudis Awards	Best Production Design	Alexander Linde	Nominated	
