= Concessions (film) =

- Theatrical release poster
- Directed by: Mas Bouzidi
- Written by: Mas Bouzidi
- Produced by: Ram Segura Khagram; Malcolm Brainerd; Sophia Winkler
- Starring: Michael Madsen; Steven Ogg; Josh Hamilton; Ivory Aquino; Ari Barkan; Lana Rockwell; Rob Riordan; Jonathan Lorenzo Price; Volkan Eryaman; Greg Roman
- Cinematography: Derrick Chen
- Edited by: Erin DeWitt
- Music by: John Keville; Chuck Pinnell
- Production companies: Terra Productions; Kebrado; Sentenza Film Company
- Distributed by: Magenta Edge Films
- Release dates: August 15, 2025 (Edinburgh); September 22, 2026 (United States)
- Country: United States
- Language: English

Concessions is a 2025 American comedy drama film written and directed by Mas Bouzidi. The film stars Michael Madsen (in one of the first movies released after his death on July 3), Steven Ogg, Josh Hamilton, Lana Rockwell, Ivory Aquino, Ari Barkan, Rob Riordan, Volkan Eryaman, and Jonathan Lorenzo Price.

The film premiered at the Edinburgh International Film Festival on August 15, 2025.

== Cast ==
- Rob Riordan as Hunter
- Jonathan Lorenzo Price as Lorenzo
- Lana Rockwell as Deana
- Josh Hamilton as Dingo Dan
- Steven Ogg as Luke Plimpton
- Michael Madsen as Rex Fuel, a former stuntman
- Ivory Aquino as Linda Chung
- Volkan Eryaman as Sergio
- Ritisha Chakraborty as Ava
- Greg Roman as The Theater Philopsopher
- Nate Odenkirk as Carson
- Valéry Lessard as Valeria
- Max Madsen as Ringo Mortimer
- Samuel Dunning as Lazeretti
- Flora Nolan as Goobers Girlfriend
- Michael Lotano as President Taft
- Victor Albaum as White House Servant #1
- Trarell Rogers as White House Servant #2
- John Dinello as Bob the Producer
- Ari Barkan as Flaming Hot Popcorn
- Robert Aberdeen as The Pastor
- Monte Bezell as Police Chief

== Production ==
It was announced that Michael Madsen, Steven Ogg, Josh Hamilton, and more additions added to the cast.

== Release ==
Concessions premiered at Edinburgh International Film Festival on August 15, 2025. The film was released in the United States on September 22, 2026.
