= Marietta Canty House =

Historic house in Connecticut, United States

- U.S. National Register of Historic Places
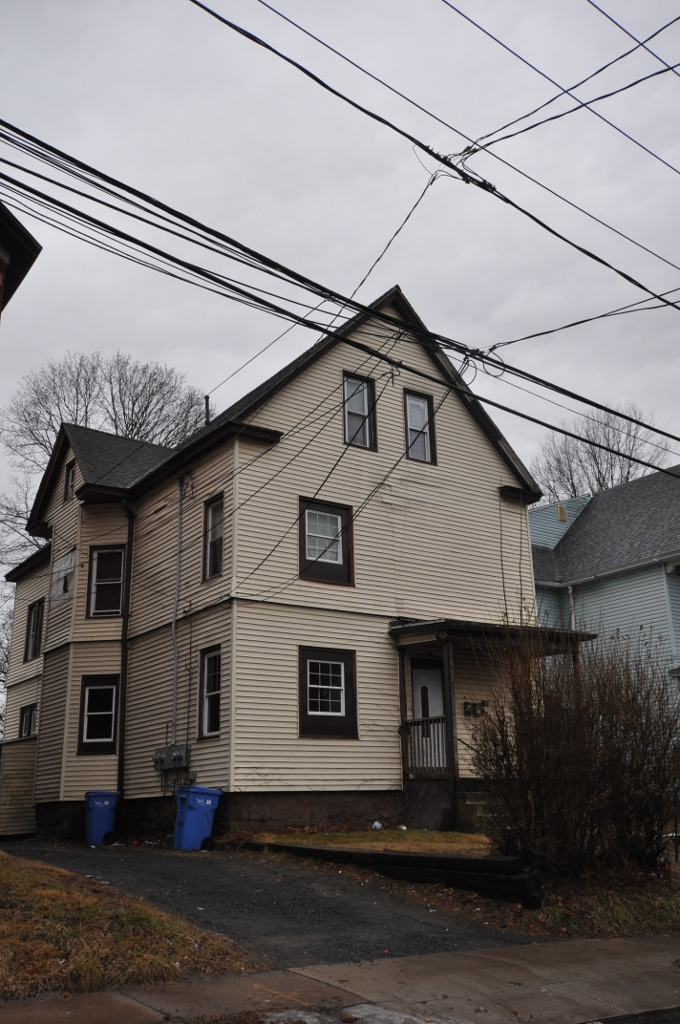

- Location within Connecticut Location within the United States
- Location: 61 Mahl Avenue; Hartford, Connecticut
- Coordinates: 41°46′54″N 72°40′45″W
- Area: less than one acre
- Architect: Fredrick Mahl
- Architectural style: Queen Anne
- NRHP reference No.: 00001536
- Added to NRHP: December 15, 2000

The Marietta Canty House is a historic house at 61 Mahl Avenue in Hartford, Connecticut. Built about 1897, this Queen Anne style house is notable as the home of singer and African American activist Marietta Canty (1905–1986). It was listed on the National Register of Historic Places in 2000.

== Description and history ==
The Marietta Canty House stands in a residential area in Hartford's Clay-Arsenal neighborhood, north of the downtown. It is on the south side of Mahl Avenue, just east of its junction with Bethel Avenue. It is one of a row of similar vernacular Queen Anne two-family houses built by developer Frederick Mahl between 1893 and 1897. It is a 2 1/2-story wood-frame structure, with a gabled roof and exterior clad in vinyl siding. It is two bays wide, with a formerly two-story (now single-story) porch sheltering the entrance on the right bay. Although the building is not architecturally distinguished, its interior retains original finishes and materials, including staircases, trim, gas lighting fixtures, and fireplaces.

The house was purchased in 1930 by Mary and Henry Canty. Henry Canty, who worked as a janitor for the city, was a prominent member of Hartford's African American community, a devout Christian attending Metropolitan African Methodist Episcopal Zion Church, and an active canvasser for the Republican Party. He was also a prominent community activist, helping to organize community clubs for African Americans when the local YMCA would not admit them, and helping to run Camp Bennett, a summer camp for urban youth in Glastonbury.

Canty's daughter Marietta appeared on stage on Broadway and elsewhere, and had more than 40 film roles, including parts in Rebel without a Cause, The Bad and the Beautiful and Lady in the Dark. Her typical film role was that of a domestic servant. She ended her acting career in 1951, and returned to Hartford, where she was active in community affairs and politics. She was twice a candidate for Hartford's city council.

The house was added to the National Register of Historic Places in 2000.

== See also ==
- National Register of Historic Places listings in Hartford, Connecticut
