= Douglas Croft =

American actor

- Born: Douglas Malcolm Wheatcroft; August 12, 1926; Seattle, Washington, U.S.
- Died: October 24, 1963 (aged 37); Los Angeles, California, U.S.
- Resting place: Fort Rosecrans National Cemetery, Point Loma, San Diego, California, U.S.
- Occupation: Actor
- Years active: 1941–1947

Douglas Croft (born Douglas Malcolm Wheatcroft, August 12, 1926 – October 24, 1963) was an American teen actor who is best remembered for being the first person to portray the DC Comics character Robin, the Boy Wonder, as well as his secret identity Dick Grayson, in the 1943 serial Batman when he was 16 years old.

== Early life ==
Croft was born Douglas Malcolm Wheatcroft on August 12, 1926, in Seattle, Washington. His mother, Beatrice Hayden, married the silent film actor Stanhope Wheatcroft. They divorced in 1922, and his mother moved to San Francisco. His parents' divorce was a bitter one, and about the time he was born in August 1926, Stanhope Wheatcroft attempted to have Beatrice declared dead so that he could stop paying alimony.

== Acting career ==
Croft was living with his mother in Los Angeles in 1941. Fascinated by movie stars, a talent agent spotted him loitering near a studio and signed him up. About September 1941, he began using the stage name "Douglas Croft". He also shaved several years off his age, claiming in July 1941 and again in March 1942 that he was 11 years old. A December 1941 newspaper report listed his age as 12, when he was by then actually 15.

His first role was as the pet pupil of teacher Claudette Colbert in Remember the Day. His second role was a tiny part in the 1942 film Kings Row, with his first major part and notable performance coming the same year in Not a Ladies' Man.

His breakout role was that of the young George M. Cohan in 1942's Oscar-winning Yankee Doodle Dandy. The year 1942 also saw Croft in a substantial role as the young Lou Gehrig in The Pride of the Yankees and as Raymond in George Washington Slept Here. then as Skip in Harrigan's Kid and as Davey in Presenting Lily Mars.

Croft was the first actor to play the comic book character Dick Grayson/Robin in a movie, doing so in the 1943 15-chapter movie serial Batman. As of 2025, Croft remains the youngest person (aged 16) to portray Robin in live-action, who at that time was depicted in comic books as being a young teenager. The producers made one change to the character, and that was to give Croft a wig of untamed curly hair.

== Later life ==
Croft served in the United States armed forces during World War II.

In February 1947, he was critically injured in a motorcycle accident which killed 19-year-old driver John J. Masterson.

His final movie role in 1947's Killer McCoy was filmed in June or July 1947.

== Death ==
Croft died on October 24, 1963, in Los Angeles of acute alcohol intoxication and liver disease, aged 37. He was buried at Fort Rosecrans National Cemetery near San Diego, California.

== Filmography ==
Year	Title	Role	Notes
1941	Remember the Day	Dewey Roberts as a Boy	film debut
1942	Kings Row	Drake McHugh as a Boy	
1942	Not A Ladies' Man	Bill Bruce	
1942	Yankee Doodle Dandy	George M. Cohan as a boy at age 13	
1942	Flight Lieutenant	Danny Doyle as a Boy	uncredited
1942	The Pride of the Yankees	Lou Gehrig as a Boy	
1942	George Washington Slept Here	Raymond	
1943	Harrigan's Kid	Skip	
1943	Presenting Lily Mars	Davey	
1943	Batman	Robin/Dick Grayson	serial
1945	River Gang	Slug	
1947	Killer McCoy	Danny Burns, Newsboy	
