= Ivory Aquino =

American actress

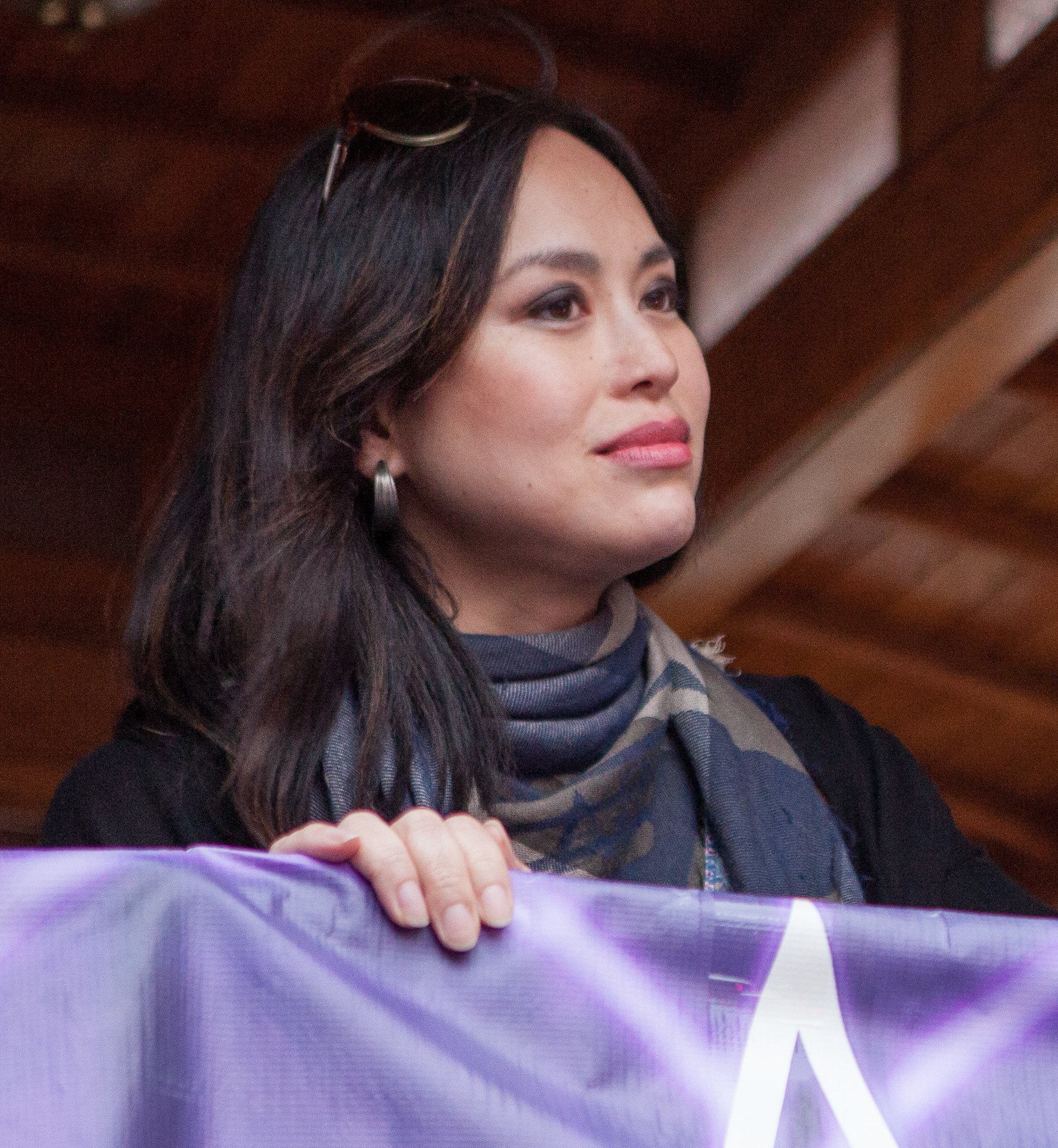
- Aquino at the 2017 San Francisco Trans March
- Education: Berklee College of Music
- Occupation: Actress
- Notable credit: When We Rise
- Relatives: Aquino family

Ivory Aquino is an American actress. She is known for portraying transgender activist Cecilia Chung in the 2017 miniseries When We Rise.

== Early life and education ==
Aquino was born in the Philippines. She knew from a very young age that she was transgender, stating in a 2017 interview, "As soon as I was born, I was always a girl; I was just assigned differently at birth." In her mid-teens, she started hormone therapy. She was often bullied at school, but her parents were supportive of her transition.

As a teenager, Aquino moved to the United States to study at the Berklee College of Music, which she graduated from summa cum laude. She enrolled to study singing, thinking that there would be no acting roles for a transgender Filipina. But after having gender confirmation surgery, Aquino decided to pursue her childhood dream of being an actor.

== Career ==
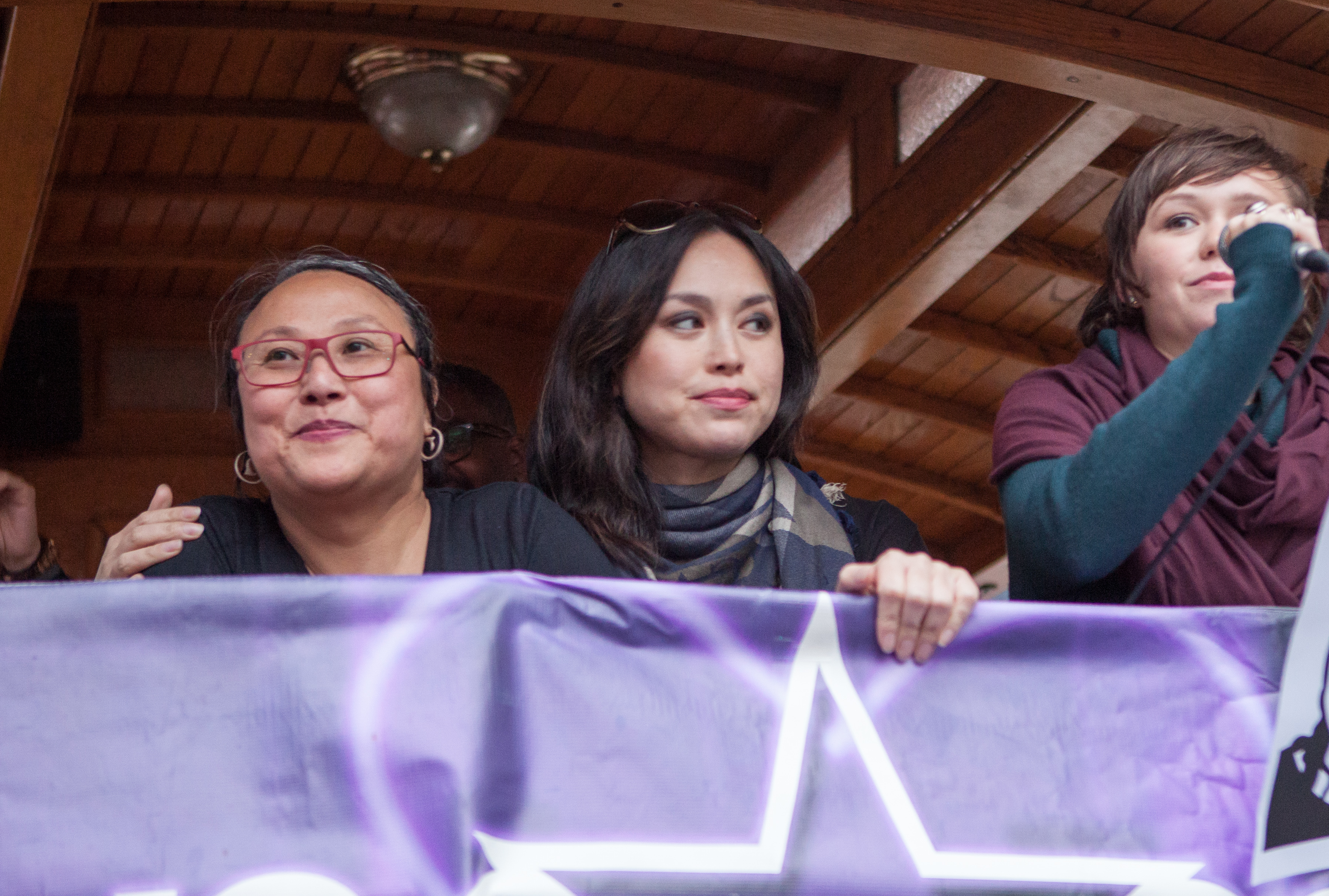
Aquino with Cecilia Chung and fellow When We Rise actress Emily Skeggs at the 2017 San Francisco Trans March

In 2015, Aquino performed the role of Juliet in a production of Romeo and Juliet in New York City with The Drilling Company's Bryant Park Presents. Other stage roles she has played include Desdemona in Othello, Mark Antony in Julius Caesar, and Isabella in Measure for Measure, all with The Drilling Company's Shakespeare in the Parking Lot on the Lower East Side of New York.

Aquino was cast in the role of transgender activist Cecilia Chung for the 2017 docudrama miniseries, When We Rise. At the time she auditioned, she had played mostly cisgender roles, and was not open about being trans, as "There never was a reason to talk about it." Aquino made sure to let series writer Dustin Black know that she was transgender, which helped her secure the part, as Black was specifically looking for trans actresses. She publicly came out as transgender during a January 2017 press conference for the series.

Aquino met with Chung in person to prepare for her part on When We Rise. They became friends; Aquino considers Chung to be a mentor and "older sister" figure in her life.

Aquino plays a minor but important character named Cassie in the FBI: Most Wanted season 1 episode "Silkworm" in 2020.

In January 2022, Aquino was cast as Alysia Yeoh in the unreleased superhero film Batgirl, set in the DC Extended Universe.

== Activism ==
Aquino has spoken out in support of trans children and transgender rights, criticizing the Donald Trump administration's overturn of federal protection for transgender students.

== Personal life ==
Aquino lives in New York City, where she enjoys spending time with her Shih Tzu dog Chewybear. She is the niece of former President of the Philippines Corazon Aquino.

== Filmography ==
=== Film ===
Year	Title	Role	Notes
2018	The Fever and the Fret	Lea	
2019	Lingua Franca	Trixie	
2020	Lapsis	Jo	
2025	Concessions	Linda Chung	

=== Television ===
Year	Title	Role	Notes
2017	When We Rise	Cecilia Chung	3 episodes
2019	When They See Us	Ms. Baqri	Episode: "Part Three"
2019	Tales of the City	Doctor Perez	Episode: "Happy Now"
2019–2020	New Amsterdam	Inmate Fran Meale	2 episodes
2020	FBI: Most Wanted	Cassie	Episode: "Silkworm"
2021	Blue Bloods	Ashley Roberts	Episode: "Guardian Angels"
2022	City on a Hill	Lourdes Mendoza	2 episodes

=== Theatre ===
Year(s)	Title	Role	Location
2026	The Real Ivanov	Anna	Lynn F. Angelson Theater
