= Batgirl (film) =

Unreleased superhero film by Adil & Bilall

- Directed by: Adil El Arbi; Bilall Fallah
- Screenplay by: Christina Hodson
- Based on: Batgirl by: Gardner Fox; Carmine Infantino
- Produced by: Kristin Burr
- Starring: Leslie Grace; J. K. Simmons; Jacob Scipio; Brendan Fraser; Michael Keaton; Ivory Aquino
- Cinematography: John Mathieson
- Edited by: Martin Walsh
- Music by: Natalie Holt
- Production companies: DC Films; Burr! Productions
- Country: United States
- Language: English
- Budget: $90 million

Batgirl is an unreleased American superhero film based on the DC Comics character Barbara Gordon / Batgirl. Directed by Adil El Arbi and Bilall Fallah from a screenplay by Christina Hodson, the film starred Leslie Grace as Batgirl alongside J. K. Simmons, Jacob Scipio, Brendan Fraser, Michael Keaton, and Ivory Aquino. The film was intended to be part of the DC Extended Universe (DCEU). Kristin Burr produced the film for DC Films and the streaming service HBO Max.

Development of a Batgirl feature film began in March 2017 with Joss Whedon attached to write and direct, but he left the project a year later. Hodson was hired to write a new script in April 2018, with El Arbi and Fallah hired to direct in May 2021 when the film was confirmed as an HBO Max original. Grace was cast that July, and additional actors joined in the following months, with Keaton reprising his role as Bruce Wayne / Batman from the earlier films Batman (1989) and Batman Returns (1992), as well as the DCEU film The Flash (2023). Filming lasted from November 2021 to March 2022 in Glasgow, Scotland.

In August 2022, DC Films and HBO Max's parent company Warner Bros. Discovery (WBD) announced that while the film had entered post-production, the studio no longer planned to release it as scheduled due to the company's cost-cutting measures and a refocus on theatrical releases. The shelving of a nearly complete, big-budget film from a major studio was considered an unprecedented move and drew backlash from audiences, commentators, and some executives, while the cast and crew received support from industry professionals. Some United States lawmakers requested that the United States Department of Justice reconsider the WBD merger, citing its business practices, including the cancellation of the film.

== Cast ==
- Leslie Grace as Barbara Gordon / Batgirl:
  A vigilante in Gotham City and the daughter of police commissioner James Gordon. Grace said the character did not have "a lot of nuances in her thinking" when the story began and that she "vacillate[s] between the nuances of life" as well in between her beliefs of good vs. evil and black-and-white thinking, but said Barbara would "discover a lot about parts of herself" throughout the story that causes her to change her worldview.
- J. K. Simmons as James Gordon:
  The commissioner of the Gotham City Police Department, Barbara's father, and a close ally of Batman. Simmons said the film would explore the character outside of his job as commissioner, showing "much more of a domestic aspect of Jim Gordon" through his relationship with Barbara.
- Jacob Scipio as Anthony Bressi: A mob boss in Gotham City.
- Brendan Fraser as Ted Carson / Firefly:
  A disgruntled veteran who becomes a sociopathic pyromaniac. Fraser said that Carson had an original backstory, rather than being adapted from a previous version of the character.
- Michael Keaton as Bruce Wayne / Batman: A wealthy socialite from an alternate universe version of Gotham City who moonlights as a crimefighting vigilante.
- Ivory Aquino as Alysia Yeoh: A bartender and Barbara's best friend.

Rebecca Front, Corey Johnson, and Ethan Kai also had undisclosed roles, with Kai portraying a "leading" character. The villain Killer Moth was also expected to appear.

== Production ==
=== Development ===
In May 2016, the DC Comics character Barbara Gordon / Batgirl had the potential to appear in a female superhero team-up film starring Margot Robbie as Harley Quinn, which became Birds of Prey (2020). Batgirl was ultimately not included in the film due to the development of a solo film starring the character. Joss Whedon was hired in March 2017 to write, direct, and produce the solo film, which was being overseen by Warner Bros. Pictures president Toby Emmerich and DC Films chairmen Jon Berg and Geoff Johns. Whedon was to begin production on the film in 2018, but left the project in February 2018 after being unable to come up with a story for it. There was also additional scrutiny on Whedon as a male director of a female-focused film, with Warner Bros. and new DC Films president Walter Hamada planning at that point to replace Whedon with a female filmmaker.

Birds of Prey writer Christina Hodson was hired to write a new screenplay for Batgirl in April 2018, and was expected to begin writing the film after completing her work on another DC Extended Universe (DCEU) film, The Flash (2023). In December 2020, Batgirl was listed as a film that could potentially be released exclusively on the streaming service HBO Max, rather than in theaters, as part of Hamada's new plan for the DCEU, and in April 2021 it was included on DC's slate of films that were expected to be released in 2022 or 2023. Adil El Arbi and Bilall Fallah, who were both longtime fans of the character, were hired to direct the film a month later, when it was confirmed as an HBO Max original. Kristin Burr was producing the film by then and said the directors were bringing an excited energy that would make it a "fun ride" and show a different side of Gotham City from previous DC projects.

=== Casting ===
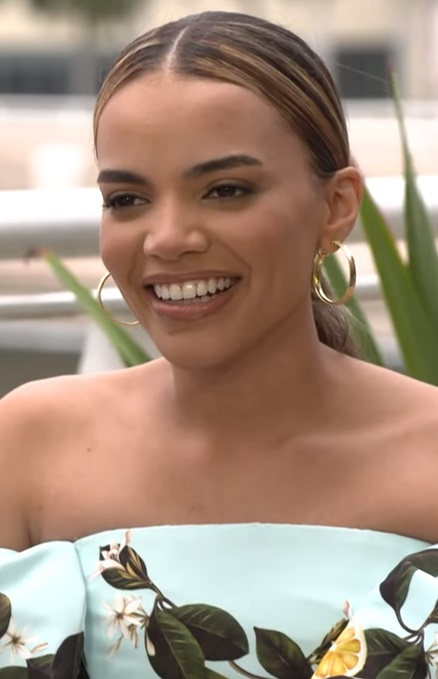
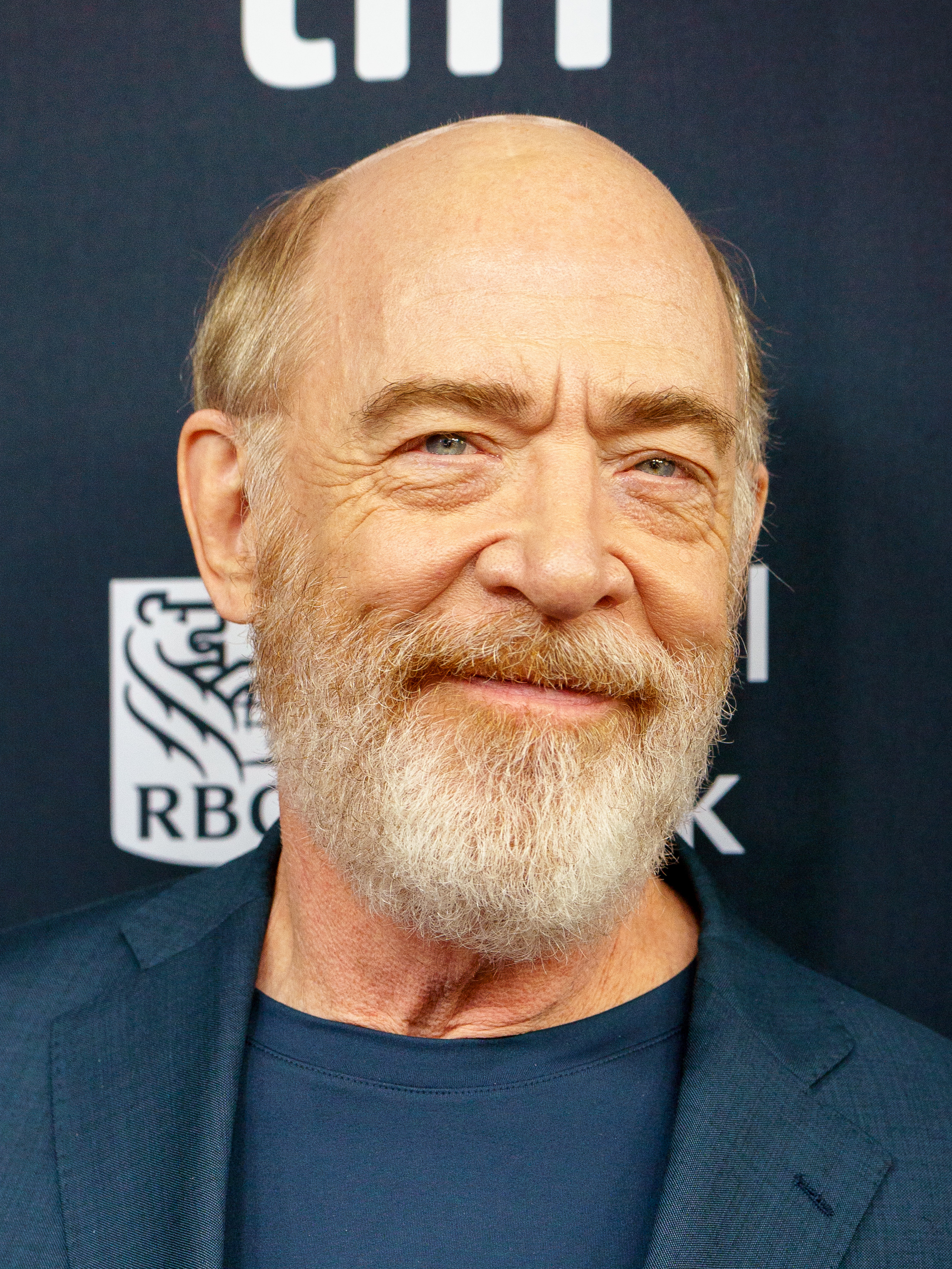
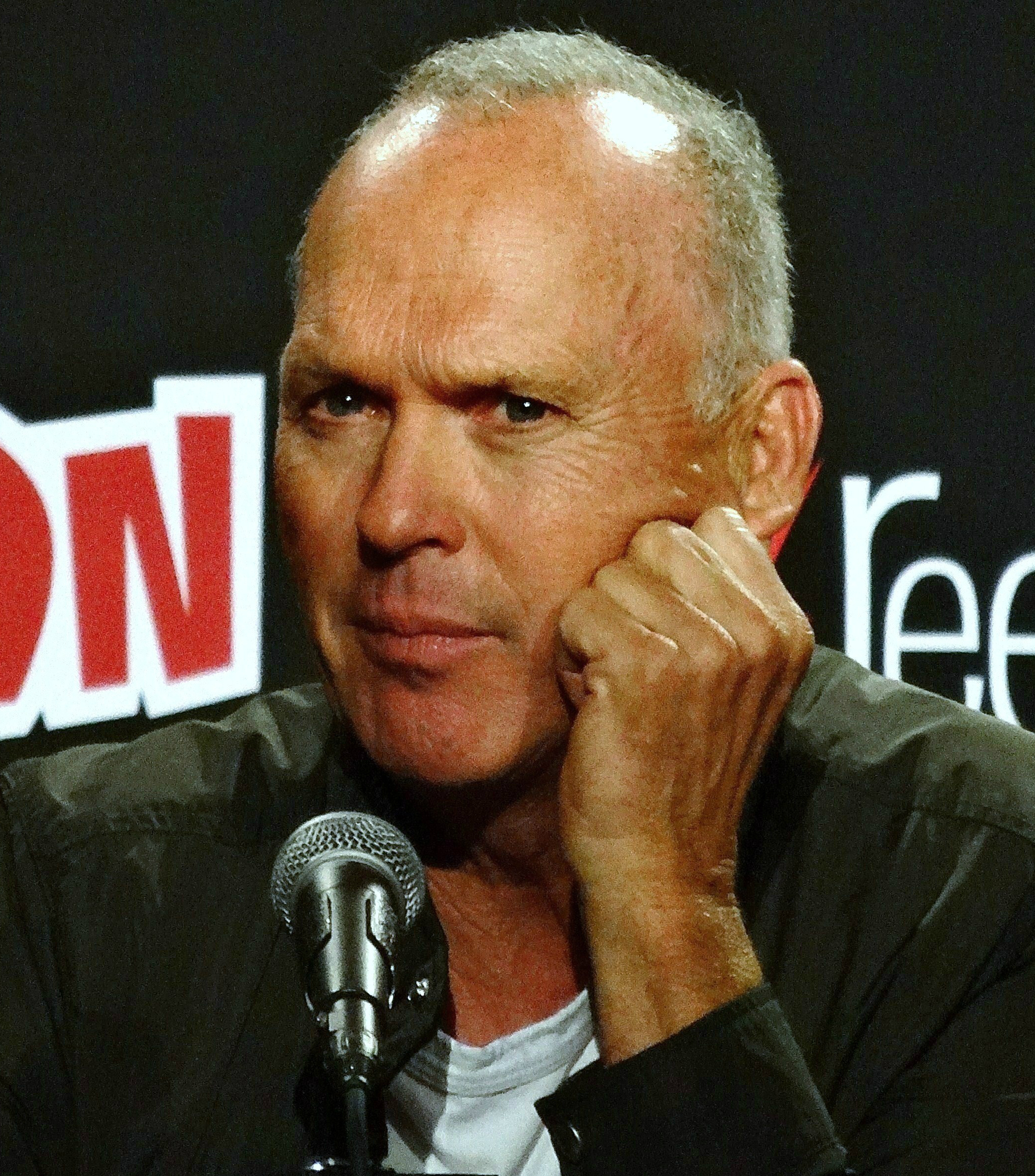
Leslie Grace was cast to make her debut as Batgirl, while J. K. Simmons and Michael Keaton were cast to reprise their roles as James Gordon and Batman from prior DC films.

DC executives began testing actresses for Batgirl in the week of July 19, 2021, with the group reportedly including Isabela Merced, Zoey Deutch, Leslie Grace, and Haley Lu Richardson; Richardson and Grace were considered to be the top contenders. Richardson went through several stages of auditioning, but Grace was cast in the role on July 21. By July 29, J. K. Simmons was in talks to reprise his role as Batgirl's father, Commissioner James Gordon, from Justice League (2017) and its director's cut, Zack Snyder's Justice League (2021). Simmons was confirmed to be reprising his role for the film in October.

Jacob Scipio and Brendan Fraser joined the cast later in October, respectively as the mob boss Anthony Bressi, and as the villain Firefly. Fraser previously voiced Cliff Steele / Robotman in the DC Comics television series Doom Patrol (2019–2023). Though it was initially reported that Fraser would portray the Garfield Lynns iteration, he later clarified in July 2022 that he was playing the Ted Carson iteration, with an original backstory not adapted from existing material. The villain role was originally offered to Sylvester Stallone, who voiced King Shark in the DCEU film The Suicide Squad (2021), but "things just didn't work out".

Also in October, El Arbi and Fallah said the character Batman would appear in the film but declined to confirm if Ben Affleck would reprise his role from previous DCEU projects. In December, Michael Keaton was revealed to be appearing in Batgirl, reprising his role as Batman from the films Batman (1989) and Batman Returns (1992). Keaton had been expected to first reprise the role for the DCEU in The Flash before that film's delay to 2023. Rebecca Front, Corey Johnson, Ethan Kai, and Ivory Aquino also joined the cast, with Aquino playing Alysia Yeoh, who was set to be the first major transgender character in a DC film.

=== Filming and post-production ===
Principal photography began in Glasgow, doubling for Gotham City, on November 30, 2021, under the working title Cherry Hill. John Mathieson served as cinematographer. El Arbi and Fallah had arrived in Glasgow on August 24 to prepare for filming, and scouted locations with production designer Christopher Glass. Glasgow was previously used to depict Gotham City in The Flash as well as the non-DCEU film The Batman (2022). Filming officially wrapped on March 31, 2022.

In April 2022, Arbi and Fallah exited Beverly Hills Cop: Axel F (2024) to focus on Batgirl. Following the merger between WarnerMedia—the owner of DC and Warner Bros.—with Discovery, Inc. to form Warner Bros. Discovery (WBD) and the fall in stock prices for Netflix later that month, executives at Warner Bros. were reportedly considering a switch for the film from a streaming release with a budget of around $70 million to a theatrical release with increased budget for post-production and a larger marketing push. The film was in post-production by the time its release was cancelled in August 2022, with Martin Walsh serving as editor. It did not have completed visual effects and still required some scenes to be filmed.

=== Music ===
Natalie Holt announced in September 2021 that she would compose the score. She reached out to composer Danny Elfman regarding her plans to use the original Batman theme for Keaton's character, of which he approved.

== Marketing ==
El Arbi, Fallah, Hodson, and Grace promoted the film at the virtual DC FanDome event in October 2021, where they discussed their preparation for filming and revealed concept art. Grace revealed a first look at herself in costume as Batgirl in January 2022.

== Cancellation ==
=== Revelation and immediate impact ===
"The decision to not release Batgirl reflects our leadership's strategic shift as it relates to the DC universe and HBO Max. Leslie Grace is an incredibly talented actor and this decision is not a reflection of her performance. We are incredibly grateful to the filmmakers [and cast] of Batgirl... and we hope to collaborate with everyone again in the near future."

— Warner Bros. Discovery spokesperson on the decision to cancel the film

In August 2022, Warner Bros. Discovery (WBD) announced that it no longer planned to release Batgirl on HBO Max or theatrically, despite a previously scheduled 2022 release on HBO Max. TheWrap reported that WBD executives felt the film "simply did not work" and went against the new desire and mandate from CEO David Zaslav to make DC films "big theatrical event films". The Guardian reported that this put Batgirl "among the most expensive cancelled cinematic projects ever". The move was widely described as "unprecedented" in Hollywood history for a big-budget film production.

Collider, Rolling Stone, and Reuters reported that test screening responses were negative, which might have been a factor in WBD's decision; Collider's sources described the film as "a huge disappointment [that] looked cheap in comparison to other films". Rolling Stone said that WBD determined that spending an additional $7–9 million during post-production in an effort to bring Batgirl to the level of other theatrical DC films, such as Shazam! Fury of the Gods (2023), would be fruitless. However, Variety reported that studio insiders denied that the film's quality factored into the decision, reaffirming, along with The Hollywood Reporter and Deadline Hollywood, that it was part of the studio's larger cost-cutting measures, given the budget increased from an initial $70 million to $90 million, and the desire for DC films to be theatrical blockbusters. Deadline noted that test screenings showed temporary versions of the visual effects, "which tend to temper audience enthusiasm".

A subsequent Variety report indicated that WBD had concluded that writing off Batgirl for a tax break would be the most "financially sound" way of recouping its costs instead of moving the film to a theatrical release with additional investment, selling it to another distributor, or releasing it on HBO Max. Deadline reported that the filmmakers had been told that WBD specifically wanted to take advantage of a purchase accounting maneuver, related to the WarnerMedia–Discovery merger and related strategy changes, that had to be invoked by the middle of August. WBD chief financial officer Gunnar Wiedenfels defended the decision, which he felt had been "blown out of proportion". He explained that WBD was focused on moving forward from WarnerMedia's plans that they disagreed with through course corrections, such as the cutbacks. He said they would still make significant investments in their intellectual properties, but that these would differ from what the company had previously done. From July to September 2022, WBD accumulated over $2 billion in write-offs of films and television content, which it referred to as "strategic content programming assessments".

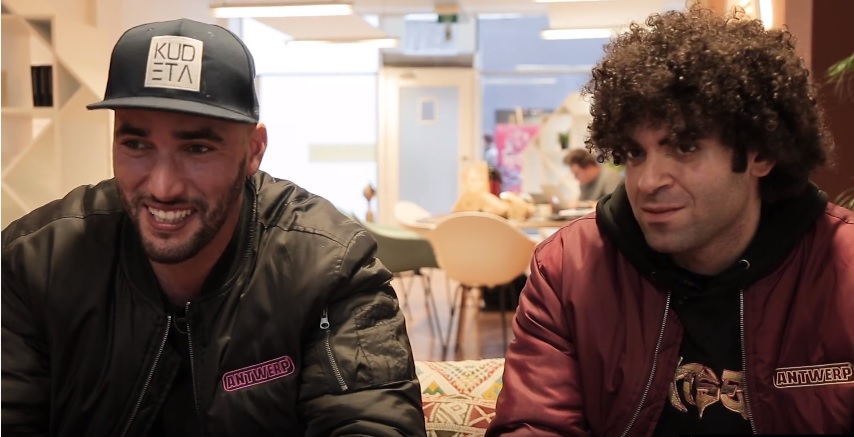
After the film was shelved, directors Bilall Fallah and Adil El Arbi unsuccessfully attempted to obtain some of its footage and received support from other industry figures.

Hamada was not consulted regarding the decision and only learned about it when Warner Bros. Pictures Group co-chairpersons and CEOs Michael De Luca and Pamela Abdy informed him at a test screening for Black Adam (2022). Hamada was upset and considered resigning, but agreed to stay until Black Adam's release in October. The cast and crew did not learn of the cancellation until after the New York Post broke the story on August 2; El Arbi and Fallah were in Morocco for El Arbi's wedding when they were informed. They released a statement on August 3 that they were "saddened and shocked", but thanked the cast and said they were grateful to have contributed to the DCEU. Film industry figures, including Keaton, Marvel Studios president Kevin Feige, and directors Edgar Wright and James Gunn, reached out to El Arbi and Fallah to express support. Following the announcement of the cancellation, El Arbi and Fallah attempted to log into the Warner Bros. servers to capture some of the footage on their cellphones, but they were unable to. The unfinished film was privately screened on the Warner Bros. studio lot, exclusive to cast and crew who had worked on the film, along with their representatives and company executives.

=== Responses and post-cancellation ===
The film's cancellation prompted multiple opinion pieces responding to the decision and to its potential impact on Hollywood and the representation of Latinos in film. Richard Newby of The Hollywood Reporter felt it was "implausible" that the film would not have succeeded commercially because of its inclusion of Keaton's Batman and argued that it would have garnered some positive responses for the diversity of its cast and crew. He said the film's cancellation was "just another mark on the Hollywood myth that films led by women and people of color don't make money", comparing the film to the successful Marvel films Black Panther (2018) and Captain Marvel (2019), which were respectively led by Black and female actors, and disagreed with the notion that such films, including Batgirl, were risks. He also felt that WBD lacked the "patience and understanding" to replicate Marvel's success with its own franchise and was underusing lesser-known characters in the hopes of earning money quickly, and believed that Warner Bros. remained "caught in the same mess as it was six years ago, letting reactionary suits shape its universe and leaving their talent out in the cold". Amanda Alcantara, writing for Refinery29, had been relieved by Grace's casting when it was announced, because she felt it signified "a breath of fresh air" to be celebrated following the "OscarsSoWhite" hashtag controversy and highlighted the importance of Black Latinas being represented as leading ladies of Hollywood films. She was critical of WBD's decision to reverse course, expressing concern about the consequences that the lack of representation of Black Latinas could have, such as colorism, low self-esteem, and negative stereotypes of African Americans and of Latinos in the entertainment industry. She described the cancellation as a "deliberate [...] slap in the face" to Black Latinas, and compared it to instances where other women of color were not recognized for their work, including HBO Max's cancellation of the television series Gordita Chronicles (2022) starring newcomer Olivia Goncalves the prior month and Beyoncé losing the Grammy Award for Album of the Year at the 59th Annual Grammy Awards.

Filmmaker Kevin Smith said it was "an incredibly bad look to cancel the Latina Batgirl movie" and believed El Arbi and Fallah's work on the film would have been positive, noting they had a higher budget compared to the episodes they directed for the Marvel series Ms. Marvel (2022), which he enjoyed. Clint Gage at IGN affirmed Smith's assertion and calculated that WBD regained around $25 million through the tax write-off, with a loss of approximately $65 million rather than the film's total $90 million budget. Gage opined that had the studio spent an additional $10 million to finish the visual effects, the film would have likely reached its break-even point and recouped its budget had it received a theatrical release, contrasting the superhero film Morbius (2022), which grossed $160 million despite being critically panned.

External documents
- Letter to DOJ (April 7, 2023) (Archived April 7, 2023, at the Wayback Machine) presents a letter to the United States Department of Justice regarding WBD's use of tax-cuts to shelve nearly-completed projects, particularly citing the cancellation of Batgirl

After Gunn and producer Peter Safran became the co-CEOs of DC Studios in late 2022, Safran said in January 2023 that the film was "not releasable" as it "would not have been able to compete in the theatrical marketplace; it was built for the small screen". Though he praised the actors' and crew's talents, he added that, had it been released, it would have "hurt" the DC brand and those involved. The cancellation of Batgirl was a factor in filmmaker Dan Lin, who produced The Lego Batman Movie (2017) for Warner Bros., passing on the opportunity to run DC Films under WBD before Gunn and Safran were hired, because he was concerned about the decision. In April, four United States lawmakers penned a letter to the United States Department of Justice asking it to reconsider the WBD merger and investigate its use of cost-cutting measures, which they alleged had "adopt[ed] potentially anticompetitive practices that reduce[d] consumer choice and harm[ed] workers in affected labor markets" and thus "hollow[ed] out an iconic American studio", citing its layoffs and consolidation since the prior year as well as the shelving of nearly-completed projects for tax write-offs, such as Batgirl and the "consumer outcry" over its cancellation. Deadline Hollywood noted that it would be unusual for the DOJ to reopen a merger review soon after its completion.

== Future ==
Prior to the film's cancellation, Grace and Margot Robbie both expressed interest in a crossover between Batgirl and Robbie's Harley Quinn. Grace said in April 2022 that there were discussions between the crew regarding the plot for a Batgirl sequel, but whether a sequel was greenlit would have depended on the film's reception upon release. When WBD announced the film's cancellation, it stated that it hoped to work on other projects with El Arbi, Fallah, and Grace. Deadline reported that Warner Bros. was attempting to renegotiate its deals with the three at that time. In January 2023, El Arbi and Fallah said they were open to working with Gunn and Safran at DC Studios on a different project in the future. Safran also noted that the character of Batgirl would "inevitably" be included in DC Studios's DC Universe (DCU) story.

== See also ==
- List of abandoned and unfinished films
- Coyote vs. Acme and Scoob! Holiday Haunt, other Warner Bros. films that had their releases canceled
