= Lists of television programs with LGBTQ characters =

These lists of television programs with LGBTQ characters include:

== Characters ==
- List of lesbian characters in television
- List of gay characters in television
- List of bisexual characters in television
- List of transgender characters in television
- List of LGBT characters in radio and podcasts
- List of LGBT characters in soap operas

== Series ==
- List of animated series with LGBTQ+ characters
- List of GL dramas
- List of BL dramas
- List of comedy television series with LGBT characters
- List of dramatic television series with LGBT characters: 1960s–2000s
- List of dramatic television series with LGBT characters: 2010–2015
- List of dramatic television series with LGBT characters: 2016–2019
- List of dramatic television series with LGBT characters: 2020s
- List of horror television series with LGBT characters

== Episodes ==
- List of 1970s American television episodes with LGBT themes
- List of 1980s American television episodes with LGBT themes
- List of 1990s American television episodes with LGBT themes
- Lists of American television episodes with LGBT themes
- List of pre–Stonewall riots American television episodes with LGBT themes

== Films ==
- List of made-for-television films with LGBT characters

== Miscellaneous ==
- List of fictional asexual characters
- List of fictional bisexual characters
- List of fictional gay characters
- List of fictional intersex characters
- List of fictional lesbian characters
- List of fictional non-binary characters
- List of fictional pansexual characters
- List of fictional trans characters
- List of news and information television programs featuring LGBT subjects

== Cast ==
- List of comedy and variety television programs with LGBT cast members
- List of reality television programs with LGBT cast members

== See also ==
- Television works about intersex
