= List of news and information television programs featuring LGBT subjects =

The following televisions programs include central LGBTQ+ themes or cast members.

== News and information programs ==
Year	Title	Network	Personality	Notes
2013–	Time of Death	Showtime	Nicole "Little" Lencioni	Little is a 25-year-old lesbian who becomes caretaker to her younger siblings after their mother dies.
2013–2014	Hello Ross	E!	Ross Matthews	Weekly talk show focusing on the entertainment industry.
2011–2018	The Chew	ABC	Clinton Kelly	
2011–2014	Our America with Lisa Ling	OWN		"Transgender Lives" originally aired February 22, 2011. "Pray the Gay Away?" originally aired March 8, 2011. "Pray the Gay Away - Breaking News", a follow-up, aired August 21, 2012. Another follow-up, "God & Gays", aired June 20, 2013.
2011–2012	The Rosie Show	OWN	Rosie O'Donnell	The series debuted on October 10, 2011.
2010–	The Gossip Queens	Syndicated	Alec Mapa	
2010–2017	Fashion Police	E!	George Kotsiopoulos	
2010–	The Talk	CBS	Sara Gilbert	
2010–2012	The Nate Berkus Show	Syndicated	Nate Berkus	
2010	"Gary and Tony Have a Baby"	CNN	Gary Spino; Tony Brown	An installment in CNN's ...In America documentary series anchored by Soledad O'Brien.
2009–	Watch What Happens: Live	Bravo	Andy Cohen	Talk show focusing on the world of entertainment in general and Bravo programming specifically.
2009–	Don't Quit Your Gay Job	OUTtv	Rob Easton; Sean Horlor	Two hosts competing on who is best in various stereotypical jobs.
2009	The Wanda Sykes Show	Fox	Wanda Sykes; Brant Kaiwi	Talk show. Kaiwi performed in the drag persona "Porche".
2008–?	here! With Josh and Sara	here!	Josh Rosenzweig	Televised version of the podcast of the same name.
2008–	Primetime: What Would You Do?	ABC	Various scenarios involving gay-related media	
2008	The Ben and Dave Show	here!	Ben Harvey; Dave Rubin	Televised version of the podcast of the same name.
2006–2007	The Megan Mullally Show	MyNetworkTV	Megan Mullally	Talk show. Mullally acknowledged her bisexuality while appearing on Will & Grace.
2006	Inside TV Land: Tickled Pink	TV Land		Hour-long special on the history of homosexuality in classic TV programs.
2005–2009	365gay News	Logo	Jason Bellini; Itay Hod; Chagmion Antoine	News programming produced in partnership with CBS. Originally titled CBS News on Logo. Moved to online-only in 2009.
2004–2006	The Brini Maxwell Show	Style	Ben Sander as Brini Maxwell	Drag queen with home and hobby tips.
2004	How Gay are You?	Sky1		'Lighthearted' look at whether it is possible to be 'too gay'?
2003–2013	What Not to Wear	TLC	Clinton Kelly	
2003–2022	The Ellen DeGeneres Show	Syndicated	Ellen DeGeneres	Talk show hosted by DeGeneres.
2003–	Anderson Cooper 360	CNN	Anderson Cooper	Nightly news show hosted by journalist Anderson Cooper. Cooper came out publicly in July 2012.
2003	Totally Gay!	VH1	Trev Broudy (Narrator); Ellen DeGeneres; Melissa Etheridge; Rupert Everett; Barney Frank; John Cameron Mitchell	Documentary about the mainstreaming of LGBT culture in the United States.
2002–	The Suze Orman Show	CNBC	Suze Orman	Orman is a financial adviser and television personality who has written a number of books. She came out publicly in 2007.
2002–2005	Locker Room	PrideVision	PJ DeBoy; Nina Arsenault	Gay sports program.
2001–2002	That Gay Show	BBC	Kristian Digby; Scott Capurro	Lifestyle magazine show aimed at gay men.
2000–2003	So Gay TV	PrideVision	Mathieu Chantelois; Jason Ruta	Newsmagazine show about LGBT issues.
1997–2001	QT: QueerTelevision	Citytv	Irshad Manji	
1997–	The View	Syndicated	Rosie O'Donnell	O'Donnell joined the cast in 2006 and left in 2007.
1996–2002	The Rosie O'Donnell Show	Syndicated	Rosie O'Donnell	O'Donnell came out shortly before leaving the show.
1996–1998	The RuPaul Show	VH1	RuPaul	Talk show hosted by drag queen.
1995–2001	10% QTV	Rogers Television		LGBT newsmagazine; first continuing LGBT-themed series in Canadian television history
1994–1995	The Charles Perez Show	Syndicated	Charles Perez	Perez was not openly gay during the series, although his appearance in an episode of the first season of The Real World had the effect of outing him.
1993–2004	Ricki Lake	Syndicated	Jonny McGovern	McGovern was a correspondent for the show during its final season.
1993–1999	Turning Point	ABC		"For Better or Worse: Same-Sex Marriage" aired November 7, 1996.
1992–2012	In the Life	PBS		Monthly LGBT news magazine.
1980	Gay Power, Gay Politics	CBS		Episode of CBS Reports purporting to explore gay political clout in San Francisco but was criticized for focusing on the seamier aspects of gay life.
1973–	ABC News Closeup	ABC		The episode "Homosexuals" first aired on December 18, 1979.
1972	Coming Out	Maclean-Hunter		Short-run documentary series profiling LGBT people in Toronto.
1967	CBS Reports: The Homosexuals	CBS	Hal Call; Frank Kameny; Jack Nichols; Gore Vidal	Hosted by Mike Wallace. Several anonymous gay men were interviewed for the program, which concealed the men's identities by seating them in shadow and in one instance behind a potted palm tree.
1961	The Rejected	KQED (TV)	Hal Call; Don Lucas	One hour documentary produced by local public television station.
1956–1978	This Week	ITV		The program aired the documentary "Homosexuals" in 1964, followed by "Lesbians" in 1965.

== See also ==
- Lists of television programs with LGBT characters
