= List of dramatic television series with LGBTQ characters: 2016–2019 =

This is a list of dramatic television series (including web television and miniseries) that premiered in 2016–2019 which feature lesbian, gay, bisexual, and transgender characters. Non-binary, pansexual, asexual, and graysexual characters are also included. The orientation can be portrayed on-screen, described in the dialogue or mentioned.

== 2016 ==
Year	Show	Network	Character	Actor	Notes
2016–2020	3%	Netflix	Joana Coelho	Vaneza Oliveira	Joana is bisexual and an orphan who survived on her own at the margins of society on the streets of the Inland.
2016–2020	3%	Netflix	Natália	Amanda Magalhães	Natalia is lesbian and Joana's partner. Joana and Natalia start a revolution against Maralto.
2016–2020	3%	Netflix	Ariel	Marina Matheus	Ariel is a trans woman.
2016–2020	3%	Netflix	Láis	Fernanda Vasconcellos	Láis is bisexual.
2016–2020	3%	Netflix	Samira	Maria Flor	Samira is bisexual.
2016	Addicted	iQiyi	Bai Luo Yin	Xu Weizhou	Luo Yin is the main character and Gu Hai's love interest.
2016	Addicted	iQiyi	Gu Hai	Huang Jingyu	Gu Hai is the main character and Luo Yin's love interest.
2016	American Gothic	CBS	Alison Hawthorne-Price	Juliet Rylance	Alison Hawthorne-Price is bisexual.
2016	American Gothic	CBS	Naomi Flynn	Maureen Sebastian	Naomi Flynn is a lesbian.
2016–2022	Animal Kingdom	TNT	Deran Cody	Jake Weary	Deran Cody is gay.
2016–2022	Animal Kingdom	TNT	Lila Cole	Anne Ramsay	Lila Cole is a lesbian.
2016–2022	Animal Kingdom	TNT	Adrian Dolan	Spencer Treat Clark	Adrian Dolan is gay.
2016–2022	Animal Kingdom	TNT	Janine "Smurf" Cody	Ellen Barkin	Janine "Smurf" Cody is bisexual.
2016–2022	Animal Kingdom	TNT	Mark Liston	Andy Favreau	Mark Liston is gay.
2016–2022	Animal Kingdom	TNT	Linc	Damon Erik Williams	Linc is gay.
2016	Barracuda	ABC	Danny Kelly	Elias Anton	Danny Kelly is gay.
2016	Barracuda	ABC	Martin Taylor	Ben Kindon	Martin Taylor is Danny Kelly's love interest.
2016	Barracuda	ABC	Demet	Nicole Gulasekharam	Demet is a lesbian.
2016–2019	Berlin Station	Epix	Hector DeJean	Rhys Ifans	Hector DeJean is gay when it's a matter of national security.
2016–2022	Better Things	FX	Sil	Ser Anzoategui	Sil is non-binary.
2016–2022	Better Things	FX	Tressa	Rebecca Merz	Tressa is a lesbian.
2016–2022	Better Things	FX	Frankie Fox	Hannah Alligood	Frankie Fox is gender queer.
2016–2022	Better Things	FX	Mer Kodis	Marsha Thomason	Mer Kodis is a lesbian.
2016–2023	Billions	Showtime	Tara Mohr	Annapurna Sriram	Tara Mohr is a lesbian.
2016–2023	Billions	Showtime	Donnie Caan	David Cromer	Donnie Caan and Walter are married.
2016–2023	Billions	Showtime	Walter	Matthew Humphreys	Donnie Caan and Walter are married.
2016–2023	Billions	Showtime	Taylor Mason	Asia Kate Dillon	Taylor Mason is non-binary.
2016–2023	Billions	Showtime	Lauren Turner	Jade Eshete	Lauren Turner is a lesbian.
2016–2023	Billions	Showtime	Fiona	Michaela Sprague	Fiona is a lesbian.
2016–2022	Bull	CBS	Chunk Palmer	Chris Jackson	Chunk Palmer is gay.
2016–2017	The Catch	ABC	Margot Bishop	Sonya Walger	Margot Bishop is bisexual.
2016–2017	The Catch	ABC	Felicity	Shivani Ghai	Felicity is bisexual.
2016–2017	The Catch	ABC	Shawn Sullivan	Caleb Smith	Shawn Sullivan is gay. Shawn Sullivan asks Danny Yoon out on a date. Danny Yoon declines. Sophie Novak tells Danny Yoon, "I knew he was gay this whole time".
2016	The Cate Morland Chronicles	YouTube	Eleanor Monk	Erika Ovudoba	Eleanor is a lesbian. She is Cate Morland's best friend. Web series that is an adaption of Jane Austen's novel, Northanger Abbey.
2016–2017	Chance	Hulu	Carl Allan	Clarke Peters	Carl is gay.
2016	Class	BBC Three	Charlie Smith	Greg Austin	Charlie Smith is gay. His boyfriend is Matteusz Andrzejewski.
2016	Class	BBC Three	Matteusz Andrzejewski	Jordan Renzo	Matteusz Andrzejewski is gay. His boyfriend is Charlie Smith.
2016	The Collection	Amazon Prime Video; BBC Worldwide	Claude Sabine	Tom Riley	Claude Sabine is gay.
2016	Conviction	ABC	Hayes Morrison	Hayley Atwell	Hayes Morrison is bisexual.
2016	Conviction	ABC	Jackson Morrison	Daniel Franzese	Jackson Morrison is gay.
2016	Conviction	ABC	Franklin "Frankie" Cruz	Manny Montana	Franklin "Frankie" Cruz is in love with Rey Armas.
2016	Conviction	ABC	Rey Armas	Ian Paola	Franklin "Frankie" Cruz is in love with Rey Armas.
2016	Conviction	ABC	Naomi Golden	Ilfenesh Hadera	Naomi Golden is bisexual and Hayes Morrison's ex-girlfriend.
2016	Crashing	Channel 4	Fred	Jonathan Bailey	Fred is gay.
2016	Crashing	Channel 4	Will	Lachie Chapman	Will is Fred's boyfriend.
2016–2023	The Crown	Netflix	Antony Armstrong-Jones	Matthew Goode	Antony Armstrong-Jones, 1st Earl of Snowdon is bisexual.
2016–2023	The Crown	Netflix	Patrick	Michael Therriault	
2016–2017	Degrassi: Next Class	Family Channel	Miles Hollingsworth III	Eric Osborne	Miles is bisexual.
2016–2017	Degrassi: Next Class	Family Channel	Zoe Rivas	Ana Golja	Zoe is a lesbian.
2016–2017	Degrassi: Next Class	Family Channel	Tristan Milligan	Lyle Lettau	Tristan is gay.
2016–2017	Degrassi: Next Class	Family Channel	Vijay Maraji	Dante Scott	Vijay is gay.
2016–2017	Degrassi: Next Class	Family Channel	Yael Baron	Jamie Bloch	Yael is non-binary/genderqueer and uses they/them pronouns.
2016–2017	Degrassi: Next Class	Family Channel	Rasha Zuabi	Dalia Yegavian	Rasha is a lesbian.
2016–2017	Degrassi: Next Class	Family Channel	Esme Song	Chelsea Clark	Esme and Frankie enter a polyamorous relationship with Zig.
2016–2017	Degrassi: Next Class	Family Channel	Francesca "Frankie" Hollingsworth	Sara Waisglass	Esme and Frankie enter a polyamorous relationship with Zig.
2016	The Deleted	Fullscreen	Agatha	Madeline Brewer	Agatha is bisexual.
2016	The Deleted	Fullscreen	Sophie	Julia Kelly	Sophie is bisexual.
2016–2019	Designated Survivor	ABC	Dontae Evans	Ben Watson	Dontae is gay.
2016–2019	Designated Survivor	ABC	Sasha Booker	Jamie Clayton	Sasha is a trans woman.
2016–2017	Dirk Gently's Holistic Detective Agency	BBC America	Panto Trost	Christopher Russell	Panto and Silas are lovers.
2016–2017	Dirk Gently's Holistic Detective Agency	BBC America	Silas Dengdamor	Lee Majdoub	Panto and Silas are lovers.
2016–2017	Dirk Gently's Holistic Detective Agency	BBC America	Tina Tevetino	Izzie Steele	Tina is bisexual.
2016–2019	The Durrells	ITV	Sven	Ulric von der Esch	Sven is gay.
2016–2019	Easy	Netflix	Jo	Jacqueline Toboni	Jo and Chase meet, fall in love, and become a lesbian couple in season 1 episode 2, "Vegan Cinderella".
2016–2019	Easy	Netflix	Chase	Kiersey Clemons	Jo and Chase meet, fall in love, and become a lesbian couple in season 1 episode 2, "Vegan Cinderella".
2016–2022	El marginal	Televisión Pública Argentina	Juan Pablo "Diosito" Borges	Nicolás Furtado	Juan is bisexual. He is in love with Miguel Palacios/Osvaldo Peña.
2016–2022	El marginal	Televisión Pública Argentina	Morcilla	Carlos Portaluppi	Morcilla is bisexual.
2016–2022	El marginal	Televisión Pública Argentina	Fiorella	Guido Botto Fiora	Fiorella is gay. He is in a relationship with Morcilla.
2016	Eyewitness	USA Network	Philip Shea	Tyler Young	Philip Shea is gay, his lover is Lukas Waldenbeck.
2016	Eyewitness	USA Network	Lukas Waldenbeck	James Paxton	Lukas Waldenbeck is gay, his lover is Philip Shea.
2016–2018	Falling Water	USA Network	Alexis Simms	Sepideh Moafi	Detective Alexis Simms is lesbian. She lives with Christine.
2016–2018	Falling Water	USA Network	Christine	Parisa Fitz-Henley	Christine is lesbian and the girlfriend of Alexis.
2016	The Family	ABC	Willa Warren	Alison Pill	Willa Warren is a lesbian.
2016	The Family	ABC	Bridey Cruz	Floriana Lima	Bridey Cruz is bisexual.
2016	The Gay and Wondrous Life of Caleb Gallo	YouTube	Caleb Gallo	Brian Jordan Alvarez	Caleb and Benicio get married at the end of the series.
2016	The Gay and Wondrous Life of Caleb Gallo	YouTube	Benicio	Antonio Marziale	Caleb and Benicio get married at the end of the series.
2016	The Gay and Wondrous Life of Caleb Gallo	YouTube	Billy	Jon Ebeling	Billy has feeling for Caleb.
2016	The Gay and Wondrous Life of Caleb Gallo	YouTube	Freckle	Jason Greene	Freckle is non-cisgender/genderfluid.
2016–2017	The Get Down	Netflix	Marcus 'Dizzee' Kipling	Jaden Smith	Dizzee and Thor are featured in a gay storyline. They go to an exclusive underground LGBT club and kiss.
2016–2017	The Get Down	Netflix	Thor	Noah Le Gros	Dizzee and Thor are featured in a gay storyline. They go to an exclusive underground LGBT club and kiss.
2016	Gilmore Girls: A Year in the Life	Netflix	Michel Gerard	Yanic Truesdale	Michel Gerard is gay.
2016	Gilmore Girls: A Year in the Life	Netflix	Donald	Sam Pancake	Donald is gay.
2016–2021	The Girlfriend Experience	Starz	Christine Reade	Riley Keough	Christine Reade is bisexual.
2016–2021	The Girlfriend Experience	Starz	Avery Suhr	Kate Lyn Sheil	Avery Suhr is a lesbian.
2016–2021	The Girlfriend Experience	Starz	Darya Esford	Narges Rashidi	Darya Esford is a lesbian.
2016–2021	The Girlfriend Experience	Starz	Anna Garner	Louisa Krause	Anna Garner is a lesbian.
2016–2021	The Girlfriend Experience	Starz	Erica Myles	Anna Friel	Erica Myles is a lesbian.
2016–2021	Goliath	Amazon Prime Video	Michelle McBride	Maria Bello	Michelle McBride is bisexual.
2016–2021	Goliath	Amazon Prime Video	Callie Senate	Molly Parker	Callie Senate is a lesbian.
2016	The Good Wife (South Korean)	tvN	Kim Dan	Nana	Kim Dan is bisexual, and an investigator for a law firm. Kim Dan is the first bisexual woman on a Korean drama.
2016–2018	Hap and Leonard	SundanceTV	Leonard Pine	Michael K. Williams	Leonard Pine is a gay black Vietnam vet.
2016–2018	Hap and Leonard	SundanceTV	Raoul	Enrique Murciano	Raoul is gay.
2016	Heartbeat	NBC	Max Eliott	Joshua Leonard	Max Eliott is gay.
2016–2017	I Love Dick	Amazon Prime Video	Devon	Roberta Colindrez	Devon is a queer. She is a butch cowboy who works as a groundskeeper at an artist colony.
2016–2017	I Love Dick	Amazon Prime Video	Toby	Bobbi Salvör Menuez	Toby is a bisexual artist at the colony and has a brief fling with Devon.
2016–2017	Incorporated	Syfy	Theo Marquez	Eddie Ramos	Theo Marquez's boyfriend is Anthony.
2016–2017	Incorporated	Syfy	Anthony	Matt Landry	Theo Marquez's boyfriend is Anthony.
2016–2022	Jamie Johnson	CBBC	Dillon Simmonds	Patrick Ward	Dillon Simmonds comes out as gay in season 5.
2016–2022	Jamie Johnson	CBBC	Elliot	Laquarn Lewis	Elliot is gay.
2016–2022	Jamie Johnson	CBBC	Becky Walker-Cotton	Mali Tudno Jones	Becky Walker-Cotton is lesbian.
2016–2022	Jamie Johnson	CBBC	Dawn Walker-Cotton	Tonya Smith	Dawn Walker-Cotton is lesbian.
2016–2022	Legends of Tomorrow	CW	Sara Lance	Caity Lotz	Sara Lance is bisexual.
2016–2022	Legends of Tomorrow	CW	Todd Rice	Lance Henriksen	Todd Rice is gay.
2016–2022	Legends of Tomorrow	CW	Ava Sharpe	Jes Macallan	Ava Sharpe is a lesbian. Ava enters into a relationship with Sara.
2016–2022	Legends of Tomorrow	CW	Lindsay Carlisle	Ali Liebert	Lindsay Carlisle is a lesbian.
2016–2022	Legends of Tomorrow	CW	Queen Anne	Rebecca Eady	Queen Anne is bisexual. She sleeps with Sara in episode "Out of Time", and later consummates her marriage to the King of France.
2016–2022	Legends of Tomorrow	CW	Guinevere	Elyse Levesque	Guinevere is bisexual, and an English queen featured in episode "Camelot/3000" who develops a crush on Sara and they kiss.
2016–2022	Legends of Tomorrow	CW	Alex Danvers	Chyler Leigh	Alex Danvers is a lesbian, and she has a one-night stand with Sara.
2016–2022	Legends of Tomorrow	CW	Captain Cold	Wentworth Miller	Citizen Cold is gay.
2016–2022	Legends of Tomorrow	CW	Ray Terrill	Russell Tovey	Ray is gay.
2016–2022	Legends of Tomorrow	CW	John Constantine	Matt Ryan	John is bisexual.
2016–2022	Legends of Tomorrow	CW	Gary Green	Adam Tsekhman	Gary is bisexual.
2016–2022	Legends of Tomorrow	CW	Desmond	Christian Keyes	Desmond is queer and had a relationship with John Constantine.
2016–2022	Legends of Tomorrow	CW	Kate Kane	Wallis Day	Kate Kane is lesbian.
2016–2022	Legends of Tomorrow	CW	Charlie	Maisie Richardson-Sellers	Charlie is pansexual and genderfluid.
2016–2022	Legends of Tomorrow	CW	Nyssa al Ghul	Katrina Law	Nyssa al Ghul is bisexual.
2016–2022	Legends of Tomorrow	CW	Miss Sinclair	Sophia Johnson	Miss Sinclair is a lesbian.
2016–2021	Lucifer	Fox; Netflix	Lucifer Morningstar	Tom Ellis	Lucifer is bisexual
2016–2021	Lucifer	Fox; Netflix	Mazikeen (Maze)	Lesley-Ann Brandt	Maze is queer.
2016–2021	Lucifer	Fox; Netflix	Eve	Inbar Lavi	Eve is pansexual.
2016–2018	Luke Cage	Netflix	Hernan "Shades" Alvarez	Theo Rossi	Shades is bisexual.
2016–2018	Luke Cage	Netflix	Comanche Jones	Thomas Q. Jones	Comanche is gay.
2016–2021	Marcella	ITV	Matthew Neil	Ben Cura	Matthew Neil is Yann Hall's boyfriend.
2016–2021	Marcella	ITV	Yann Hall	Tobias Santelmann	Yann Hall is Matthew Neil's boyfriend.
2016–2021	Marcella	ITV	Cara Thomas	Florence Pugh	Cara Thomas is bisexual.
2016–2021	Marcella	ITV	Sascha Kyte	Victoria Broom	Sascha is a lesbian.
2016–2021	Marcella	ITV	Jojo Baines	Tamzin Malleson	Jojo Baines is lesbian.
2016–2018	The Night Manager	BBC One	Major Lance "Corky" Corkoran	Tom Hollander	Lance is gay.
2016–2017	No Tomorrow	The CW	Kareema	Sarayu Blue	Kareema is bisexual.
2016–2017	No Tomorrow	The CW	Sofia	Marta Milans	Sofia is bisexual.
2016	Notorious	ABC	Levi	Ramon de Ocampo	Levi admitted he was in love with Oscar, and then he committed suicide in front of Julia.
2016–2019	The OA	Netflix	Buck Vu	Ian Alexander	Buck Vu is transgender.
2016–2019	The OA	Netflix	Alfonso "French" Sosa	Brandon Perea	Alfonso is gay.
2016–2017	Pure Genius	CBS	Jess Wallace	Taylor Rose	Jess Wallace is a lesbian.
2016–2017	Pure Genius	CBS	Ally (Ali)	Irene Choi	Ally (Ali) is a lesbian.
2016–2017	Pure Genius	CBS	Gloria	Jazzmun	Gloria is a trans woman.
2016	Quarry	Cinemax	Buddy	Damon Herriman	Buddy is gay, and an assassin for hire.
2016–2017	The Real O'Neals	ABC	Kenneth "Kenny" Christopher Sebastian O'Neal	Noah Galvin	Kenny is a 16-year-old middle child who comes out to his family as gay.
2016–2017	The Real O'Neals	ABC	Ricky	Garrett Clayton	Ricky is Kenny's first gay crush.
2016–2017	The Real O'Neals	ABC	Jake	Conrad K. Pratt	Jake flirted with Kenny.
2016–2017	The Real O'Neals	ABC	Sam	Jamie Denbo	Sam is a divorced lesbian.
2016–2017	The Real O'Neals	ABC	Stuart	Caleb Pierce	Stuart only comes out as gay at the end of the season 1.
2016–2017	The Real O'Neals	ABC	Sebastian	Jake McLean	Sebastian gave Kenny his first gay kiss.
2016–2017	The Real O'Neals	ABC	Allison Adler-Wong	Ramona Young	Allison is Kenny's closeted lesbian best friend.
2016–2017	The Real O'Neals	ABC	Brett Young	Sean Grandillo	Brett is Kenny's first boyfriend.
2016–2017	The Real O'Neals	ABC	Steve the Colorist	Ray Ford	Steve is a gay hairdresser.
2016–2017	The Real O'Neals	ABC	Trina	Kennedy Lea Slocum	Trina is Allison's ballerina girlfriend.
2016–2017	The Real O'Neals	ABC	Mr. Peters	Cheyenne Jackson	Peters is a gay music teacher.
2016	Recovery Road	Freeform	Vern Testaverde	Daniel Franzese	Vern Testaverde is gay and an ex-cocaine addict.
2016–2018	Shades of Blue	NBC	Lieutenant Matt Wozniak	Ray Liotta	Wozniak is bisexual and the corrupt commander of the 64th Precinct.
2016–2018	Shades of Blue	NBC	Donnie Pomp	Michael Esper	Donnie Pomp shares a kiss with Lieutenant Matt Wozniak, and has sex with him.
2016–2018	Shades of Blue	NBC	Nate Wozniak	Cameron Scoggins	Nate Wozniak is gay.
2016–2017	The Shannara Chronicles	MTV; Spike	Eretria	Ivana Baquero	Eretria is bisexual. She may have romantic feelings for Amberle in season 1.
2016–2017	The Shannara Chronicles	MTV; Spike	Princess Lyria	Vanessa Morgan	Princess Lyria was in a relationship with Eretria in season 2.
2016–2017	The Shannara Chronicles	MTV; Spike	Zora	Zoe Robins	Zora is a lesbian.
2016–2017	SOTUS	One 31; Line TV	Kongpob	Singto Prachaya	Kongpob and Arthrit are gay love interests.
2016–2017	SOTUS	One 31; Line TV	Arthrit	Krist Perawat	Kongpob and Arthrit are gay love interests.
2016–2019	Star	FOX	Simone Davis	Brittany O'Grady	Simone Davis is bisexual. She kissed her friend, Karen, in the fifth episode of season 2.
2016–2019	Star	FOX	Cotton Brown	Amiyah Scott	Cotton Brown is the transgender daughter of Carlota Brown.
2016–2019	Star	FOX	Miss Bruce	Miss Lawrence	Miss Bruce is a trans woman.
2016–2019	Star	FOX	Karen Williams	Imani Lewis	Karen Williams is a lesbian.
2016–2019	Star	FOX	Nina Ferrera	Camila Banus	Nina Ferrera is bisexual.
2016–2019	Star	FOX	Rachel Wallace	Paris Jackson	Rachel Wallace is a lesbian.
2016–2025	Stranger Things	Netflix	Robin Buckley	Maya Hawke	Robin Buckley is lesbian.
2016–2025	Stranger Things	Netflix	Will Byers	Noah Schnapp	Will Byers is gay.
2016–2022	This Is Us	NBC	William Hill	Ron Cephas Jones	William Hill is bisexual and had a relationship with Jessie.
2016–2022	This Is Us	NBC	Jessie	Denis O'Hare	William Hill is bisexual and had a relationship with Jessie.
2016–2022	This Is Us	NBC	Tess Pearson	Eris Baker; Iantha Richardson	Tess comes out as a lesbian.
2016–2022	This Is Us	NBC	Alex	Presley Alexander	Alex is non-binary and undefined orientation.
2016–2022	This Is Us	NBC	Animal Shelter Clerk	Lena Waithe	Animal Shelter Clerk is a lesbian.
2016–2018	Timeless	NBC	Denise Christopher	Sakina Jaffrey	Denise is a lesbian and a Special Agent. She's married to Michelle, with whom she has a son and daughter.
2016–2017	Too Close to Home	TLC	Dax	Nick Ballard	Dax and Victor are a gay couple.
2016–2017	Too Close to Home	TLC	Victor	Charles Justo	Dax and Victor are a gay couple.
2016–2018	Travelers	Showcase; Netflix	Joanne Yates	Kimberley Sustad	Joanne Yates is lesbian.
2016–2018	Travelers	Showcase; Netflix	Samantha Burns	Karen Holness	Samantha Burns is a lesbian.
2016–2018	Travelers	Showcase; Netflix	Amanda Myers	Enid-Raye Adams	Amanda Myers is a lesbian.
2016–2021	Van Helsing	Syfy	Susan Jackson	Hilary Jardine	Susan Jackson is a lesbian.
2016–2021	Van Helsing	Syfy	Vanessa Helsing	Kelly Overton	Vanessa Helsing is bisexual.
2016–2021	Van Helsing	Syfy	Dracula	Tricia Helfer	Dracula is bisexual.
2016–2021	Van Helsing	Syfy	Jack	Nicole Muñoz	Jack is a lesbian.
2016–2021	Van Helsing	Syfy	Sarah "Doc" Carol	Rukiya Bernard	Sarah "Doc" Carol is a lesbian.
2016–2021	Van Helsing	Syfy	Bathory	Jesse Stanley	Bathory is a lesbian.
2016–2021	Van Helsing	Syfy	Ivory	Jennifer Cheon	Ivory is a lesbian.
2016–2021	Van Helsing	Syfy	Jolene	Caroline Cave	Jolene is a lesbian.
2016–2021	Van Helsing	Syfy	Michaela	Heather Doerksen	Michaela is a lesbian.
2016–2019	Victoria	ITV	Lord Alfred Paget	Jordan Waller	Lord Alfred and Lord Edward have a romantic attraction for each other and share a kiss in season 2.
2016–2019	Victoria	ITV	Lord Edward Drummond	Leo Suter	Lord Alfred and Lord Edward have a romantic attraction for each other and share a kiss in season 2.
2016–2022	Westworld	HBO	Logan	Ben Barnes	Logan is bisexual. He is seen having sex with both a man and a woman in episode 2 of season 1.
2016–2022	Westworld	HBO	Clementine Pennyfeather	Angela Sarafyan	Clementine Pennyfeather is pansexual.
2016–2022	Westworld	HBO	Elsie Hughes	Shannon Woodward	Elsie Hughes is a lesbian.
2016–2022	Westworld	HBO	Marti	Bojana Novakovic	Marti is bisexual.
2016–2021	Wynonna Earp	Syfy; CHCH-DT; Space	Waverly Earp	Dominique Provost-Chalkley	Waverly, the younger sister of Wynonna, is bisexual and had a boyfriend until she met Nicole Haught.
2016–2021	Wynonna Earp	Syfy; CHCH-DT; Space	Nicole Haught	Katherine Barrell	Nicole Haught is a lesbian.
2016–2021	Wynonna Earp	Syfy; CHCH-DT; Space	Jeremy Chetri	Varun Saranga	Jeremy is gay.
2016–2021	Wynonna Earp	Syfy; CHCH-DT; Space	Robin	Justin Kelly	Robin is gay.
2016–2021	Wynonna Earp	Syfy; CHCH-DT; Space	Rosita Bustillos	Tamara Duarte	Rosita Bustillos is bisexual.
2016–2021	Wynonna Earp	Syfy; CHCH-DT; Space	Shae	Clark Backo	Shae is a lesbian.
2016–2021	Wynonna Earp	Syfy; CHCH-DT; Space	Ambrose "Fish"	Tyrell Crews	Fish is gay. He was in a relationship with Levi.
2016–2021	Wynonna Earp	Syfy; CHCH-DT; Space	Levi	Christian Goutsis	Levi is gay. He was in a relationship with Fish.
2016	The Young Pope	HBO	Cardinal Bernardo Gutierrez	Javier Cámara	Cardinal Bernardo Gutierrez comes out as gay in the first season's final episode.
2016	The Young Pope	HBO	Cardinal Andrew Dussolier	Scott Shepherd	Andrew is bisexual. He has sex with a man and a woman in episode 6 of season 1.
2016	The Young Pope	HBO	Cardinal Mario Assente	Maurizio Lombardi	Cardinal Mario Assente is gay.
2016	The Young Pope	HBO	Ángelo Sanchez	Marcos Franz	Ángelo Sanchez is gay. He commits suicide after being rejected to becoming a priest.
2016	The Young Pope	HBO	Freddy Blakestone	Alex Esola	Freddy is gay.
2016	The Young Pope	HBO	Archbishop Kurtwell	Guy Boyd	Archbishop Kurtwell is gay.
2016	The Young Pope	HBO	Cardinal Michel Marivaux	Sebastian Roché	Cardinal Michel Marivaux is gay.

== 2017 ==
Year	Show	Network	Character	Actor	Notes
2017–2020	13 Reasons Why	Netflix	Courtney Crimsen	Michele Selene Ang	Courtney is a lesbian. She was closeted until the season 2 finale. episode "Bye", when she came out to her adoptive gay parents.
2017–2020	13 Reasons Why	Netflix	Todd Crimsen	Robert Gant	Todd and Steve are gay and Courtney's parents.
2017–2020	13 Reasons Why	Netflix	Steve Crimsen	Alex Quiojan	Todd and Steve are gay and Courtney's parents.
2017–2020	13 Reasons Why	Netflix	Ryan Shaver	Tommy Dorfman	Ryan told Hannah he was gay in episode "Tape 4, Side B".
2017–2020	13 Reasons Why	Netflix	Tony Padilla	Christian Navarro	Tony is openly gay. He used to date Ryan and Brad, but is now dating Caleb.
2017–2020	13 Reasons Why	Netflix	Brad	Henry Zaga	Brad is gay, and Caleb's boyfriend.
2017–2020	13 Reasons Why	Netflix	Caleb	R.J. Brown	Caleb is gay and Tony's boyfriend.
2017–2020	13 Reasons Why	Netflix	Tameka	Clarke Hollingsworth	Tameka is queer and Courtney's girlfriend.
2017–2020	13 Reasons Why	Netflix	Montgomery "Monty" de la Cruz	Timothy Granaderos	Monty is gay and closeted.
2017–2020	13 Reasons Why	Netflix	Winston Williams	Deaken Bluman	Winston is gay. He tells Alex in the final episode "Graduation", that he loved Monty but that he also loves him.
2017–2020	13 Reasons Why	Netflix	Alex Standall	Miles Heizer	Alex is bisexual.
2017–2020	13 Reasons Why	Netflix	Charlie St. George	Tyler Barnhardt	Charlie is bisexual. He dates Alex and comes out to his dad in episode "Prom".
2017–2020	13 Reasons Why	Netflix	Hansen Foundry	Reed Diamond	Hansen is gay. He is a member of staff at the school.
2017	195 Lewis	195 Lewis (series website)	Yuri	Rae Leone Allen	Yuri is lesbian.
2017	195 Lewis	195 Lewis (series website)	Camille	Sirita Wright	Camille is lesbian.
2017	24 Legacy	Fox	Andy Shalowitz	Dan Bucatinsky	Andy Shalowitz is openly gay. He is a communication analyst at CTU.
2017	24 Legacy	Fox	Thomas Locke	Bailey Chase	Thomas Locke is gay. He is a CTU agent and the head of field operations.
2017–2019	A Series of Unfortunate Events	Netflix	Charles	Rhys Darby	Charles is gay and used to be in a relationship with Sir.
2017–2019	A Series of Unfortunate Events	Netflix	Sir	Don Johnson	Sir is gay and used to be Charles' partner in both business and marriage.
2017–2019	A Series of Unfortunate Events	Netflix	Jerome Squalor	Tony Hale	Jerome is bisexual.
2017–2019	A Series of Unfortunate Events	Netflix	Babs	Kerri Kenney	Babs is a lesbian.
2017–2019	A Series of Unfortunate Events	Netflix	Mrs Bass	BJ Harrison	
2017–2022	Ackley Bridge	Channel 4	Nasreen Paracha	Amy-Leigh Hickman	Nasreen comes out to her mother as a lesbian and tells her she's in love with another woman (series 1, episode 5).
2017–2022	Ackley Bridge	Channel 4	Lila Shariff	Anneika Rose	Lila is a lesbian and a science teacher.
2017–2022	Ackley Bridge	Channel 4	Naveed Haider	Gurjeet Singh	Naveed is gay.
2017–2022	Ackley Bridge	Channel 4	Sam Murgatroyd	Megan Parkinson	Sam is lesbian and Nasreen's girlfriend.
2017–2022	Ackley Bridge	Channel 4	Cory Wilson	Sam Retford	Cory is bisexual. Cory and Naveed kissed and had sex. Cory had sex with a girl the day after he had sex with Naveed.
2017–2021	American Gods	Starz	Bilquis	Yetide Badaki	Bilquis is pansexual and a goddess.
2017–2021	American Gods	Starz	Jinn	Mousa Kraish	Jinn is gay. Jinn and Salim become romantically involved.
2017–2021	American Gods	Starz	Salim	Omid Abtahi	Salim is gay. Jinn and Salim become romantically involved.
2017–2021	American Gods	Starz	Samantha ("Sam") Black Crow	Devery Jacobs	Sam is lesbian.
2017–2019	Andi Mack	Disney Channel	Cyrus Goodman	Joshua Rush	Cyrus is gay and enters a relationship with TJ in the finale. Andi Mack is the first Disney Channel series with a character that comes out as gay.
2017–2019	Andi Mack	Disney Channel	TJ Kippen	Luke Mullen	TJ is gay, and holds hands with Cyrus in the finale. Andi Mack made history with Disney's first character to say "I'm gay".
2017–2019	Anne with an E	CBC; Netflix	Josephine Barry	Deborah Grover	Josephine is a lesbian. She had a long-term partner, now deceased.
2017–2019	Anne with an E	CBC; Netflix	Cole Mackenzie	Cory Grüter-Andrew	Cole is gay.
2017–2021	Atypical	Netflix	Casey	Jack Haven	Casey is bisexual.
2017–2021	Atypical	Netflix	Izzie	Fivel Stewart	Izzie is a lesbian. She attends the GSA and relates to a lesbian student telling her story.
2017–2023	The Bastards of Pizzofalcone	RAI	Alex Di Nardo	Simona Tabasco	Alex is lesbian. Alex and Rosaria are in a relationship.
2017–2023	The Bastards of Pizzofalcone	RAI	Rosaria Martone	Serena Iansiti	Rosaria is lesbian. Alex and Rosaria are in a relationship.
2017–2019	Black Spot	France 2 Netflix	Martial "Nounours" Ferrandis	Hubert Delattre	Nounours is a gay police officer.
2017	Blood Drive	SyFy	The Scholar	Darren Kent	The Scholar is queer.
2017	Blood Drive	SyFy	The Gentleman	Andrew James Hall	The Gentleman is queer.
2017–2021	The Bold Type	Freeform	Adena El-Amin	Nikohl Boosheri	Adena is a lesbian Muslim feminist and professional photographer who begins a romance with Kat.
2017–2021	The Bold Type	Freeform	Kat Edison	Aisha Dee	Kat is bisexual. When she falls in love with Adena she first thinks she is lesbian. However, she later has feelings for a man and realizes she is attracted to men and women.
2017–2021	The Bold Type	Freeform	Leila	Katerina Tannembaum	Leila is lesbian and Adena's ex.
2017–2021	The Bold Type	Freeform	Tia Clayton	Alexis Floyd	Tia is lesbian and Kat's love interest.
2017–2021	The Bold Type	Freeform	Oliver Grayson	Stephen Conrad Moore	Oliver is gay.
2017–2021	The Bold Type	Freeform	Andrew	Adam Capriolo	Andrew is gay and a drag queen.
2017–2021	The Bold Type	Freeform	Eva Rhodes	Alex Paxton-Beesley	Eva is lesbian and Kat's love interest.
2017	Borderliner	Netflix	Nikolai Andreassen	Tobias Santelmann	Nikolai is closeted and has a secret boyfriend, Kristoffer.
2017	Borderliner	Netflix	Kristoffer Lund	Morten Svartveit	Kristoffer is gay and Nikolai's boyfriend.
2017–	Charité	Netflix	Sister Therese	Klara Deutschmann	Therese is lesbian.
2017–	Charité	Netflix	Otto Marquardt	Jannik Schümann	Otto is gay.
2017–	Charité	Netflix	Martin Schelling	Jacob Matschenz	Martin is gay.
2017–2022	Claws	TNT	Quiet Ann	Judy Reyes	Quiet Ann is a lesbian.
2017–2022	Claws	TNT	Uncle Daddy	Dean Norris	Uncle Daddy is a bisexual crime boss.
2017–2022	Claws	TNT	Toby	Evan Daigle	Toby is gay.
2017–2019	Counterpart	Starz	Nadia Fierro/Baldwin	Sara Serraiocco	Nadia is a lesbian and classical violinist. Baldwin is a lesbian assassin.
2017–2019	Counterpart	Starz	Clare Quayle	Nazanin Boniadi	Clare is a bisexual.
2017–2019	Counterpart	Starz	Greta	Liv Lisa Fries	Greta is a lesbian.
2017–2020	Dark	Netflix	Peter Doppler	Stephan Kampwirth	Peter is gay and closeted.
2017–2020	Dark	Netflix	Agnes Nielsen	Antje Traue	In 1953, Agnes and Doris were secret lovers.
2017–2020	Dark	Netflix	Doris Tiedemann	Luise Heyer	In 1953, Agnes and Doris were secret lovers.
2017–2020	Dark	Netflix	Bernadette Wöller	Anton Rubtsov	Bernadette is a trans woman.
2017	Daytime Divas	VH1	Kibby Ainsley	Chloe Bridges	Kibby is bisexual.
2017	Daytime Divas	VH1	Ella	Will Buie Jr.	Ella is an eight year old trans girl, introduced in the series "Pilot".
2017–2021	Dear White People	Netflix	Lionel Higgins	DeRon Horton	Lionel is gay.
2017–2021	Dear White People	Netflix	Silvio Romo	D.J. Blickenstaff	Silvio is gay and Lionel's love interest.
2017–2021	Dear White People	Netflix	Neika Hobbs	Nia Long	Neika and Monique are a lesbian couple.
2017–2021	Dear White People	Netflix	Monique	Zee James	Neika and Monique are a lesbian couple.
2017–2021	Dear White People	Netflix	Connor	Luke O'Sullivan	Connor and his "not exactly" girlfriend Becca, try to seduce Lionel into a threesome. Connor is using Becca as a buffer to cover up his primary interest in men.
2017–2021	Dear White People	Netflix	Kelsey Phillips	Nia Jervier	In season 2, episode 4, Kelsey tells Coco that she's a lesbian.
2017–2021	Dear White People	Netflix	Wesley Alvarez	Rudy Martinez	Wesley is gay and Lionel's love interest.
2017–2021	Dear White People	Netflix	P. Ninny	Lena Waithe	P. Ninny is a lesbian.
2017–2021	Dear White People	Netflix	Genifer	Quei Tann	Genifer is transgender.
2017–2019	The Deuce	HBO	Paul	Chris Coy	Paul is gay and a bartender at Vincent Martino's bar, the Hi-Hat.
2017	Dimension 404	Hulu	Beth Lee	Melanie Thompson	Beth and Jane are married.
2017	Dimension 404	Hulu	Jane Lee	Constance Wu	Beth and Jane are married.
2017–2022	Dynasty	The CW; Netflix	Steven Carrington	James Mackay	Steven has a one-night stand with Sam in the pilot episode.
2017–2022	Dynasty	The CW; Netflix	Sam Jones	Rafael de la Fuente	Sam is gay.
2017–2022	Dynasty	The CW; Netflix	Kirby Anders	Maddison Brown	It's revealed in Season 5 that Kirby is bisexual and the girlfriend of Amanda Carrington.
2017–2022	Dynasty	The CW; Netflix	Amanda Carrington	Eliza Bennett	Amanda is a lesbian. She confides in Kirby in Season 5 that she is in love with her, and they begin a relationship soon after.
2017	Emerald City	NBC	The Witch of the West	Ana Ularu	West is a lesbian who runs a brothel.
2017–2019	The End of the F***ing World	Channel 4 Netflix	Eunice Noon	Gemma Whelan	Eunice Noon is a lesbian. Noon and Darego are police force partners.
2017–2019	The End of the F***ing World	Channel 4 Netflix	Teri Darego	Wunmi Mosaku	Teri Darego is a lesbian.
2017–2018	Famous in Love	Freeform	Alexis Glenn	Niki Koss	Alexis is bisexual and has an affair with Rachel.
2017–2018	Famous in Love	Freeform	Rachel Davis	Katelyn Tarver	Rachel is a lesbian.
2017–2024	Feud	FX	Victor Buono	Dominic Burgess	Victor is gay.
2017	The Frozen Dead	M6	Irène Ziegler	Julia Piaton	Ziegler is openly lesbian and the captain of the St. Martin detective squad.
2017	The Frozen Dead	M6	Greta	Sophie Guillemin	Greta is Ziegler's partner and owner of a local inn where they reside together.
2017	Godless	Netflix	Marie Agnes MacNue	Merritt Weaver	Mary Agnes is bisexual. The widow of the town's mayor, she wears her husband's clothes and is in a same-sex relationship with the town's schoolteacher, Callie Dunne.
2017	Godless	Netflix	Callie Dunne	Tess Frazer	Callie is a lesbian and the town's teacher. She was a prostitute in La Belle's brothel before it was turned into a school.
2017–2018	Gone	NBC	James	Andy Mientus	James was kicked out of his home after his father found out that he was gay and later got kidnapped because of it.
2017–2022	The Good Fight	CBS All Access	Maia Rindell	Rose Leslie	Maia is lesbian. Amy is lesbian and Maia's girlfriend.
2017–2022	The Good Fight	CBS All Access	Amy Breslin	Heléne Yorke	Maia is lesbian. Amy is lesbian and Maia's girlfriend.
2017	Gypsy	Netflix	Jean Holloway	Naomi Watts	Jean is bisexual, married to a man, and becomes obsessed with Sidney.
2017	Gypsy	Netflix	Sidney Pierce	Sophie Cookson	Sidney is bisexual and the former girlfriend of one of Jean's male patients.
2017	Gypsy	Netflix	Dolly Holloway	Maren Heary	Dolly is Jean's daughter and may be lesbian or transgender.
2017	The Halcyon	ITV	Toby Hamilton	Edward Bluemel	Toby is secretly gay.
2017	The Halcyon	ITV	Adil Joshi	Akshay Kumar	Adil is having a secret gay affair with Toby.
2017–2025	The Handmaid's Tale	Hulu	Moira	Samira Wiley	Moira had a girlfriend named Oona before.
2017–2025	The Handmaid's Tale	Hulu	Oona	Zawe Ashton	Moira had a girlfriend named Oona before.
2017–2025	The Handmaid's Tale	Hulu	Emily	Alexis Bledel	Emily and Sylvia were married and had a kid before.
2017–2025	The Handmaid's Tale	Hulu	Sylvia	Clea DuVall	Emily and Sylvia were married and had a kid before.
2017–2025	The Handmaid's Tale	Hulu	Peter	Ben Lewis	Peter is gay.
2017–2025	The Handmaid's Tale	Hulu	Dan	John Carroll Lynch	Dan is gay, and lynched because of his sexuality.
2017–2025	The Handmaid's Tale	Hulu	Odette	Rebecca Rittenhouse	Odette is a lesbian.
2017–2019	Harlots	ITV Encore; Hulu	Margaret Wells	Samantha Morton	Margaret is bisexual. She and William North are common law wife and husband, and she reciprocates Nancy Birch's interest in her.
2017–2019	Harlots	ITV Encore; Hulu	Charlotte Wells	Jessica Brown Findlay	Charlotte is bisexual.
2017–2019	Harlots	ITV Encore; Hulu	Nancy Birch	Kate Fleetwood	Nancy is a lesbian.
2017–2019	Harlots	ITV Encore; Hulu	Violet Cross	Rosalind Eleazar	Violet and Amelia are in a romantic relationship.
2017–2019	Harlots	ITV Encore; Hulu	Amelia Scanwell	Jordon Stevens	Violet and Amelia are in a romantic relationship.
2017–2019	Harlots	ITV Encore; Hulu	Prince Rasselas	Josef Altin	Prince Rasselas is a gay sex worker and lives with his male partner.
2017–2019	Harlots	ITV Encore; Hulu	Lady Isabella Fitzwilliam	Liv Tyler	Lady Isabella is Charlotte's love interest in season two.
2017–2023	HIStory	Choco TV; Line TV	Mai Ying-Shiung "Hero"	Aaron Lai	Si-Ren is an unlucky lonely boy who has a crush on Hero.
2017–2023	HIStory	Choco TV; Line TV	Gu Si-Ren	Chiang Yun-lin	Si-Ren is an unlucky lonely boy who has a crush on Hero.
2017–2023	HIStory	Choco TV; Line TV	Cheng Ching	Duke Wu	Feng He is Cheng Ching's older step brother and his love interest.
2017–2023	HIStory	Choco TV; Line TV	Feng He	Edison Song	Feng He is Cheng Ching's older step brother and his love interest.
2017–2023	HIStory	Choco TV; Line TV	Chiang Chin-teng	Bernard Ho	Chin-teng was Yi-chen's lover in his previous life. After discovering a few pages from Yi-chen's diary, he grows curious about him and feigns amnesia to get closer to him. Yi-chen is determined to start a new life but finds it difficult to avoid Chin-teng, whom he still loves.
2017–2023	HIStory	Choco TV; Line TV	Shao Yi-chen	Teddy Jen	Chin-teng was Yi-chen's lover in his previous life. After discovering a few pages from Yi-chen's diary, he grows curious about him and feigns amnesia to get closer to him. Yi-chen is determined to start a new life but finds it difficult to avoid Chin-teng, whom he still loves.
2017–2023	HIStory	Choco TV; Line TV	Shih Yi-jie	Steven Chiang	Xiao Fei's presence at home brings huge changes to Yi-jie's life, and he falls in love.
2017–2023	HIStory	Choco TV; Line TV	Fei Sheng-che ("Xiao Fei")	Hunt Chang	Xiao Fei's presence at home brings huge changes to Yi-jie's life, and he falls in love.
2017–2023	HIStory	Choco TV; Line TV	Chiu Tzu-hsuan	Zach Lu	Yu-hao gradually falls in love with Tzu-hsuan.
2017–2023	HIStory	Choco TV; Line TV	Hsia Yu-hao	Fandy Fan	Yu-hao gradually falls in love with Tzu-hsuan.
2017–2023	HIStory	Choco TV; Line TV	Meng Shao-fei	Jake Hsu	Shao-fei and Tang Yi become entangled in a deadly game of wits – a game that becomes all the more complicated after Tang Yi baits a love trap for Shao-fei.
2017–2023	HIStory	Choco TV; Line TV	Tang Yi	Chris Wu	Shao-fei and Tang Yi become entangled in a deadly game of wits – a game that becomes all the more complicated after Tang Yi baits a love trap for Shao-fei.
2017–2023	HIStory	Choco TV; Line TV	Hsiang Hao-ting	Wayne Song	Hsi-ku is Hao-ting's love interest who assists him in his studies.
2017–2023	HIStory	Choco TV; Line TV	Yu Hsi-ku	Huang Chun-chih	Hsi-ku is Hao-ting's love interest who assists him in his studies.
2017–2020	Las chicas del cable (Cable Girls)	Netflix	Carlota Rodríguez de Senillosa	Ana Fernández García	Carlota is bisexual.
2017–2020	Las chicas del cable (Cable Girls)	Netflix	Oscar Ruiz	Ana Polvorosa	Oscar is a bisexual trans man who falls in love with Carlota. Carlota and Sara have a polyamorous relationship together with Carlota's husband, Miguel.
2017	Man in an Orange Shirt	BBC Two	Thomas March	James McArdle	The story of two gay relationships set in different eras: Thomas and Michael during the 1940s, and Adam and Steve in the present.
2017	Man in an Orange Shirt	BBC Two	Michael Berryman	Oliver Jackson-Cohen	The story of two gay relationships set in different eras: Thomas and Michael during the 1940s, and Adam and Steve in the present.
2017	Man in an Orange Shirt	BBC Two	Adam Berryman	Julian Morris	The story of two gay relationships set in different eras: Thomas and Michael during the 1940s, and Adam and Steve in the present.
2017	Man in an Orange Shirt	BBC Two	Steve	David Gyasi	The story of two gay relationships set in different eras: Thomas and Michael during the 1940s, and Adam and Steve in the present.
2017–2019	Mary Kills People	Global	Jess	Abigail Winter	Jess is lesbian.
2017–2019	Mary Kills People	Global	Naomi	Katie Douglas	Naomi is lesbian.
2017–2019	Mindhunter	Netflix	Wendy Carr	Anna Torv	Dr. Wendy Carr, a psychologist at a Boston university, is a lesbian in a relationship with Dr. Stilman.
2017–2019	Mindhunter	Netflix	Annaliese Stilman	Lena Olin	Annaliese is a lesbian.
2017–2019	Mindhunter	Netflix	Kay Manz	Lauren Glazier	Kay is lesbian and works as a bartender.
2017	The Mist	Spike	Adrian Garf	Russell Posner	Adrian is gay/pansexual.
2017	The Mist	Spike	Tyler Denton	Christopher Gray	Tyler is a bully and a closeted gay jock. He ends up in a relationship with Adrian, the boy he used to bully for being gay.
2017–2021	Money Heist	Netflix	Helsinki	Darko Peric	Helsinki is gay.
2017–2021	Money Heist	Netflix	Palermo	Rodrigo de la Serna	Palermo is gay.
2017–2021	Money Heist	Netflix	Tokyo	Úrsula Corberó	Tokyo is bisexual.
2017–2021	Money Heist	Netflix	Manila	Belén Cuesta	Manila is transgender.
2017–2021	Money Heist	Netflix	Berlin	Pedro Alonso	Berlin is bisexual.
2017–2019	Mr. Mercedes	Audience	Lou Linklatter	Breeda Wool	Lou is a lesbian.
2017	My Dear Loser	GMM 25	In	Purim Rattanaruangwattana (Pluem)	In and Sun become a gay couple.
2017	My Dear Loser	GMM 25	Sun	Wachirawit Ruangwiwat (Chimon)	In and Sun become a gay couple.
2017–2020	One Day at a Time	Netflix	Elena Alvarez	Isabella Gomez	Elena is lesbian, she comes out during the series first season.
2017–2020	One Day at a Time	Netflix	Ramona	Judy Reyes	Ramona is lesbian.
2017–2020	One Day at a Time	Netflix	Syd	Sheridan Pierce	Syd is non-binary. Syd is befriended by Elena and they eventually date.
2017–2022	The Orville	Fox	Bortus	Peter Macon	Bortus and Klyden are partners and members of an alien race, the Moclans, where homosexuality is the norm among their species.
2017–2022	The Orville	Fox	Klyden	Chad L. Coleman	Bortus and Klyden are partners and members of an alien race, the Moclans, where homosexuality is the norm among their species.
2017–2022	The Orville	Fox	Charly Burke	Anne Winters	Charly reveals that she was in love with her best friend Amanda in 3x06.
2017–2022	Ozark	Netflix	Roy Petty	Jason Butler Harner	Roy is gay.
2017–2022	Ozark	Netflix	Russ Langmore	Marc Menchaca	Russ is a repressed gay man.
2017–2022	Ozark	Netflix	Trevor Evans	McKinley Belcher III	Trevor is Roy's ex-boyfriend and his FBI agent partner.
2017–2022	Ozark	Netflix	Scotty	Dennis Flanagan	Scotty is Roy's ex-boyfriend.
2017–2022	Ozark	Netflix	Jim Rattelsdorf	Damian Young	Jim is gay.
2017	Prison Break: Resurrection	Fox	Sid	Kunal Sharma	Sid is gay.
2017	Prison Break: Resurrection	Fox	Emily Blake	Marina Benedict	Emily Blake is a lesbian.
2017–2018	Prison Playbook	tvN	Yoo Han Yang	Lee Kyu Hyung	Han Yang is gay.
2017–2018	Prison Playbook	tvN	Song Ji Won	Kim Joon Han	Ji Won is gay and Han Yang's boyfriend.
2017–2019	The Punisher	Netflix	David Schultz	Todd Alan Crain	David is a U.S. senator and closeted homosexual.
2017	Queers	BBC	Perce	Ben Wishaw	Perce is a gay WW1 soldier.
2017	Queers	BBC	Andrew	Fionn Whitehead	Andrew is a young gay man who took part in the protests after the defeat of a proposed amendment that would've equalized the age of consent of same-sex sexual activities to 16.
2017	Queers	BBC	Phil	Russell Tovey	Phil is a gay actor living in the time of the HIV/AIDS pandemic.
2017	Queers	BBC	Jackie	Ian Gelder	Jackie is a gay tailor.
2017	Queers	BBC	Fredrick	Kadiff Kirwan	Fredrick is a gay immigrant from the West Indies.
2017	Queers	BBC	Bobby	Gemma Whelan	Bobby is a trans man living in the 1920s.
2017	Queers	BBC	Steve	Alan Cumming	Steve is a gay man about to get married.
2017–2023	Riverdale	The CW	Kevin Keller	Casey Cott	Kevin is openly gay and had a relationship with Moose.
2017–2023	Riverdale	The CW	Moose Mason	Cody Kearsley	Moose is bisexual.
2017–2023	Riverdale	The CW	Joaquin DeSantos	Rob Raco	Joaquin is gay. He becomes romantically involved with Kevin.
2017–2023	Riverdale	The CW	Toni Topaz	Vanessa Morgan	Toni is bisexual and in a relationship with Cheryl.
2017–2023	Riverdale	The CW	Cheryl Blossom	Madelaine Petsch	Cheryl is a lesbian and in a relationship with Toni.
2017–2023	Riverdale	The CW	Fangs Fogarty	Drew Ray Tanner	Fangs is gay. Fangs and Kevin went to the prom together.
2017–2023	Riverdale	The CW	Chic	Hart Denton	Chic may be pansexual.
2017–2023	Riverdale	The CW	Charles Smith	Wyatt Nash	Charles is gay. He's in a relationship with Chic.
2017–2023	Riverdale	The CW	Peaches 'N Cream	Bernadette Beck	Peaches is queer.
2017–2019	Runaways	Hulu	Karolina Dean	Virginia Gardner	Karolina is a lesbian and an alien descendant with superpowers.
2017–2019	Runaways	Hulu	Nico Minoru	Lyrica Okano	Nico Minoru is bisexual. Formerly in a relationship with Alex Wilder, now reciprocates Karolina's attraction for her.
2017–2019	She's Gotta Have It	Netflix	Nola Darling	DeWanda Wise	Nola is a pansexual.
2017–2019	She's Gotta Have It	Netflix	Opal Gilstrap	Ilfenesh Hadera	Opal is a lesbian in a relationship with Nola.
2017–2021	The Sinner	USA Network	Heather Novack	Natalie Paul	Detective Novack is an out lesbian.
2017	Slam Dance	GMM One	Pob	Sattabut Laedeke (Drake)	Pob and Nick are a gay couple.
2017	Slam Dance	GMM One	Nick	Harit Cheewagaroon (Sing)	Pob and Nick are a gay couple.
2017–2024	Star Trek: Discovery	CBS (formerly); Netflix (formerly); Paramount+	Paul Stamets	Anthony Rapp	Paul and Hugh are gay men and in a loving relationship.
2017–2024	Star Trek: Discovery	CBS (formerly); Netflix (formerly); Paramount+	Hugh Culber	Wilson Cruz	Paul and Hugh are gay men and in a loving relationship.
2017–2024	Star Trek: Discovery	CBS (formerly); Netflix (formerly); Paramount+	Adira Tal	Blu del Barrio	Adira, the first non-binary character in the Star Trek universe, is a highly intelligent character on the U.S.S. Discovery and unexpectedly becomes friends with Lt. Commander Paul Stamets and Dr. Hugh Culber. Adira is also an introvert who does not originally tell the crew they are non-binary, using she/her pronouns until episode 8 when Adira comes out as non-binary and asks to be referred to as they or them.
2017–2024	Star Trek: Discovery	CBS (formerly); Netflix (formerly); Paramount+	Gray Tal	Ian Alexander	A trans man and orphan, who joined Trill living aboard a generational starship with his human partner Adira.
2017–2025	S.W.A.T.	CBS	Christina "Chris" Alonso	Lina Esco	Officer III Alonso comes out as bisexual in episode "Homecoming" (1.07)
2017–2020	Suburra: Blood on Rome	Netflix	Alberto "Spadino" Anacleti	Giacomo Ferrara	Spadino is a gay man whose traditional family forces him into accepting a sham straight marriage.
2017	Taboo	FX	Michael Godfrey	Edward Hogg	Michael Godfrey is probably gay, and is the secretary at the East India Company and lives in a London Molly House.
2017–2018	Valor	The CW	Thea	Melissa Roxburgh	Thea is a closeted bisexual CIA agent. She has two short-term relationships with Zoe Cho, and Leland Gallo.
2017–2018	Valor	The CW	Zoe Cho	Chelle Ramos	Thea is a closeted bisexual CIA agent. She has two short-term relationships with Zoe Cho, and Leland Gallo.
2017	When We Rise	ABC	Cleve Jones	Guy Pearce	Cleve Jones is gay and an AIDS activist. The miniseries is about the growth of the LGBTQ civil rights movement in San Francisco, from the 1970s until the 2010s, with characters based on actual persons.
2017	When We Rise	ABC	young Cleve Jones	Austin P. McKenzie	Cleve Jones is gay and an AIDS activist. The miniseries is about the growth of the LGBTQ civil rights movement in San Francisco, from the 1970s until the 2010s, with characters based on actual persons.
2017	When We Rise	ABC	Roma Guy	Mary-Louise Parker	Roma Guy is a feminist lesbian and social justice activist.
2017	When We Rise	ABC	young Roma Guy	Emily Skeggs	Roma Guy is a feminist lesbian and social justice activist.
2017	When We Rise	ABC	Diane	Rachel Griffiths	Diane is a lesbian nurse.
2017	When We Rise	ABC	young Diane	Fiona Dourif	Diane is a lesbian nurse.
2017	When We Rise	ABC	Ken Jones	Michael K. Williams	Ken Jones is a gay activist.
2017	When We Rise	ABC	young Ken Jones	Jonathan Majors	Ken Jones is a gay activist.
2017	When We Rise	ABC	Matt	Tyler Young	Matt is gay and has a relationship with young Cleve.
2017	When We Rise	ABC	Michael	Charlie Carver	Michael is a gay sailor.
2017	When We Rise	ABC	Pat Norman	Whoopi Goldberg	Pat Norman is a lesbian activist, founder of the Lesbian Mothers Union and first openly gay employee of the San Francisco Health Department.
2017	When We Rise	ABC	Del Martin	Rosie O'Donnell	Del Martin is a feminist lesbian and activist, and co-founder of Daughters of Bilitis.
2017	When We Rise	ABC	Phyllis Lyon	Maddie Corman	Phyllis Lyon is a feminist lesbian and activist, and co-founder of Daughters of Bilitis.
2017	When We Rise	ABC	Jean	Caitlin Gerard	Jean is a lesbian.
2017	When We Rise	ABC	Cecilia Chung	Ivory Aquino	Cecilia Chung is a trans woman and political activist.
2017	When We Rise	ABC	Scott	Nick Eversman	Scott is gay, living in a treehouse.
2017	When We Rise	ABC	José Sarria	Michael DeLorenzo	José Sarria is a gay political activist and founder of the Imperial Court System.
2017	When We Rise	ABC	Bobbi Jean Baker	Jazzmun	Bobbi Jean Baker is a transgender activist.
2017	When We Rise	ABC	Anne Kronenberg	Britt Irvin	Anne Kronenberg is the campaign manager for Harvey Milk and his aide on the San Francisco Board of Supervisors.
2017	When We Rise	ABC	Sally Gearhart	Carrie Preston	Sally Gearhart is a feminist lesbian and political activist.
2017	When We Rise	ABC	Jim Foster	Denis O'Hare	Jim Foster is the first openly gay man to ever speak at a Democratic convention.
2017	Will	TNT	Christopher Marlowe	Jamie Campbell Bower	Christopher is probably gay.
2017	Will	TNT	Thomas Walsingham	Edward Hayter	Thomas is allegedly Marlowe's homosexual lover.

== 2018 ==
Year	Show	Network	Character	Actor	Notes
2018–	9–1–1	FOX, ABC	Michael Grant	Rockmond Dunbar	Michael is gay, he comes out in the first episode of the show, he later marries a man named David.
2018–	9–1–1	FOX, ABC	Henrietta "Hen" Wilson	Aisha Hinds	Henrietta is lesbian and married to Karen.
2018–	9–1–1	FOX, ABC	Evan "Buck" Buckley	Oliver Stark	Buck is a bisexual man. He kissed women and men.
2018–	9–1–1	FOX, ABC	Karen Wilson	Tracie Thoms	Karen is lesbian. She and Henrietta are raising the son of Hen's ex-girlfriend.
2018–	9–1–1	FOX, ABC	Josh Russo	Bryan Safi	Josh is gay.
2018–	9–1–1	FOX, ABC	Eva Mathis	Abby Brammell	Eva is Hen's ex and an incarcerated criminal.
2018–	9–1–1	FOX, ABC	David Hale	La Monde Byrd	Michael's love interest.
2018–	9–1–1	FOX, ABC	Tommy Kinard	Lou Ferrigno Jr.	Tommy is a firefighter pilot who used to work at the 118. He's gay and dated Buck.
2018–2022	A Discovery of Witches	Sky One	Sarah Bishop	Alex Kingston	Sarah and Emily are a lesbian couple.
2018–2022	A Discovery of Witches	Sky One	Emily Mather	Valarie Pettiford	Sarah and Emily are a lesbian couple.
2018–2023	A Million Little Things	ABC	Daniel Dixon	Chance Hurstfield	Daniel is gay. He came out to his mother and sister in season 1.
2018–2023	A Million Little Things	ABC	Katherine Saville	Grace Park	Katherine is bisexual.
2018	A Very English Scandal	BBC One	Jeremy Thorpe	Hugh Grant	Jeremy Thorpe was the leader of the Liberal Party for nine years. He was a closeted homosexual who had affairs with men and was in a secret relationship with Norman Scott.
2018	A Very English Scandal	BBC One	Norman Scott	Ben Whishaw	Jeremy Thorpe was the leader of the Liberal Party for nine years. He was a closeted homosexual who had affairs with men and was in a secret relationship with Norman Scott.
2018–2022	After Forever	Amazon Prime Video	Brian	Kevin Spirtas	Brian is gay. Brian and Jason were in a relationship until Jason's death.
2018–2022	After Forever	Amazon Prime Video	Jason	Mitchell Anderson	Jason is gay.
2018–2022	After Forever	Amazon Prime Video	David Taylor	Mike McGowan	David is gay and Brian's boyfriend.
2018–2022	After Forever	Amazon Prime Video	Brenda	Erin Cherry	Brenda is lesbian.
2018–	All American	The CW	Tamia "Coop" Cooper	Bre-Z	Tamia is lesbian. She is the cousin of the main character.
2018–2020	Altered Carbon	Netflix	Isaac Bancroft	Antonio Marziale	Isaac Bancroft has a male lover, Sergei Brevlov.
2018–2020	Altered Carbon	Netflix	Sergei Brevlov	Chris McNally	Isaac Bancroft has a male lover, Sergei Brevlov.
2018	American Crime Story; The Assassination of Gianni Versace (season 2)	FX	Gianni Versace	Édgar Ramírez	Gianni Versace was gay, and murdered by spree killer Andrew Cunanan.
2018	American Crime Story; The Assassination of Gianni Versace (season 2)	FX	Andrew Cunanan	Darren Criss	Andrew Cunanan was a gay spree killer. He murdered Gianni Versace, Lee Miglin, Jeffrey Trail and David Madson.
2018	American Crime Story; The Assassination of Gianni Versace (season 2)	FX	Antonio D'Amico	Ricky Martin	Antonio D'Amico is gay and Versace's partner at the time of his death.
2018	American Crime Story; The Assassination of Gianni Versace (season 2)	FX	Lee Miglin	Mike Farrell	Lee Miglin was bisexual and married to the same woman for 38 years before he was murdered by Andrew Cunanan, his former escort.
2018	American Crime Story; The Assassination of Gianni Versace (season 2)	FX	Jeffrey Trail	Finn Wittrock	Jeffrey Trail was gay and murdered by Andrew Cunanan.
2018	American Crime Story; The Assassination of Gianni Versace (season 2)	FX	David Madson	Cody Fern	David Madson was gay, and witnessed Jeffrey Trail's murder, and was also killed by Andrew Cunanan.
2018–2020	Anne+	BNN-VARA; 3LAB	Anne	Hanna van Vliet	Anne is lesbian.
2018–2020	Baby	Netflix	Fabio Fedeli	Brando Pacitto	Fabio is gay and comes out to his father near the end of the first season. Fabio and Brando are attracted to each other in season two.
2018–2020	Baby	Netflix	Brando De Santis	Mirko Trovato	Brando is gay and comes out in the final season.
2018–2021	Black Lightning	The CW	Anissa Pierce	Nafessa Williams	Anissa is a lesbian superhero.
2018–2021	Black Lightning	The CW	Grace Choi	Chantal Thuy	Grace Choi is bisexual and Anissa's love interest.
2018–2021	Black Lightning	The CW	Chenoa	Shein Mompremier	Chenoa is a lesbian and was Anissa's girlfriend. They were together for one year before Anissa became involved with Grace.
2018–2021	Burden of Truth	CBC	Molly Ross	Sara Thompson	Molly is lesbian. Luna is lesbian and a First Nation native. Molly and Luna are in a relationship and attend the same high school. In season 1 episode "Witch Hunt" they go to the prom as a couple, holding hands as they enter and afterwards dance together.
2018–2021	Burden of Truth	CBC	Luna Spence	Star Slade	Molly is lesbian. Luna is lesbian and a First Nation native. Molly and Luna are in a relationship and attend the same high school. In season 1 episode "Witch Hunt" they go to the prom as a couple, holding hands as they enter and afterwards dance together.
2018	'Cause You're My Boy	GMM One	Mork	Drake Sattabut	Mork and Tee are the main gay couple. Morn and Gord are the supporting gay couple. A Thai romance drama depicting relationships between male characters, known as boys love, it tells the love story of four young boys in a high school setting.
2018	'Cause You're My Boy	GMM One	Tee	Frank Thanatsaran	Mork and Tee are the main gay couple. Morn and Gord are the supporting gay couple. A Thai romance drama depicting relationships between male characters, known as boys love, it tells the love story of four young boys in a high school setting.
2018	'Cause You're My Boy	GMM One	Morn	Phuwin Tangsakyuen	Mork and Tee are the main gay couple. Morn and Gord are the supporting gay couple. A Thai romance drama depicting relationships between male characters, known as boys love, it tells the love story of four young boys in a high school setting.
2018	'Cause You're My Boy	GMM One	Gord	Neo Trai Nimtawat	Mork and Tee are the main gay couple. Morn and Gord are the supporting gay couple. A Thai romance drama depicting relationships between male characters, known as boys love, it tells the love story of four young boys in a high school setting.
2018–2022	Charmed	The CW	Melanie "Mel" Vera	Melonie Diaz	Melanie "Mel" Vera is a lesbian witch. She's a Women's Studies graduate student. Niko Hamada is lesbian and a police detective. Mel and Nico are in a relationship.
2018–2022	Charmed	The CW	Nico Hamada	Ellen Tamaki	Melanie "Mel" Vera is a lesbian witch. She's a Women's Studies graduate student. Niko Hamada is lesbian and a police detective. Mel and Nico are in a relationship.
2018–	Class T1T5	YouTube	Melissa	Melissa Poh	Melissa is a lesbian student.
2018	Collateral	BBC Two; Netflix	Jane Oliver	Nicola Walker	Jane is a vicar in a lesbian relationship with an illegal immigrant, Linh Xuan Huy.
2018	Collateral	BBC Two; Netflix	Linh Xuan Huy	Kae Alexander	Jane is a vicar in a lesbian relationship with an illegal immigrant, Linh Xuan Huy.
2018–2020	Condor	Audience (season 1); Epix (season 2)	Sarah Tan	Ellen Wong	Sarah Tan is a lesbian.
2018–2020	Condor	Audience (season 1); Epix (season 2)	Sharla Shepard	Christina Moses	Sharla Shepard is a lesbian FBI agent.
2018–2023	Das Boot	Sky One	Carla Monroe	Lizzy Caplan	Carla and Simone are lovers.
2018–2023	Das Boot	Sky One	Simone Strasser	Vicky Krieps	Carla and Simone are lovers.
2018	Deutschland 86	SundanceTV	Tim Avery	Chris Veres	Tim Avery is a closeted gay American G.I.
2018	Deutschland 86	SundanceTV	Rose Seithathi	Florence Kasumba	Rose Seithathi is lesbian and in a relationship with Lenora Rauch. Lenora is openly bisexual, having been seen kissing a man in the previous season.
2018	Deutschland 86	SundanceTV	Lenora Rauch	Maria Schrader	Rose Seithathi is lesbian and in a relationship with Lenora Rauch. Lenora is openly bisexual, having been seen kissing a man in the previous season.
2018	Deutschland 86	SundanceTV	Alex Edel	Ludwig Trepte	Alex Edel is gay. He had sex with Tobias Tischbier in the previous season. Tobias Tischbier is gay. He tries to make a move on Alex in the first season, and later becomes sexually involved with him even though he was in a relationship with a man named Felix.
2018	Deutschland 86	SundanceTV	Tobias Tischbier	Alexander Beyer	Alex Edel is gay. He had sex with Tobias Tischbier in the previous season. Tobias Tischbier is gay. He tries to make a move on Alex in the first season, and later becomes sexually involved with him even though he was in a relationship with a man named Felix.
2018	Dogs of Berlin	Netflix	Erol Birkan	Fahri Yardim	Erol Birkan is gay. Guido Mack is gay and Erol's partner.
2018	Dogs of Berlin	Netflix	Guido Mack	Sebastian Achilles	Erol Birkan is gay. Guido Mack is gay and Erol's partner.
2018–2022	Druck	ZDF	Matteo Florenzi	Michelangelo Fortuzzi	Matteo is gay.
2018–2022	Druck	ZDF	David Schreibner	Lukas von Horbatschewsky	David Schreibner is a gay trans teen-aged boy and Matteo's boyfriend.
2018–2022	Druck	ZDF	Mia Winter	Milena Tscharntke	Mia is bisexual.
2018–2022	Druck	ZDF	Victoria	Tijan Marei	Victoria is a lesbian.
2018–2022	Druck	ZDF	Fatou Jallow	Sira-Anna Faal	Fatou is lesbian.
2018–2022	Druck	ZDF	Kieu My Vu	Nhung Hong	Kieu is bisexual.
2018–2022	Druck	ZDF	Isi Inci	Eren M. Güvercin	Isi is non-binary and uses all pronouns. They are in a relationship with Sascha Belin.
2018–2024	Élite	Netflix	Ander Muñoz	Arón Piper	Ander Muñoz is gay and in a relationship with Omar Shanaa. Omar is gay but has to hide his sexuality from his parents due to their Muslim faith.
2018–2024	Élite	Netflix	Omar Shanaa	Omar Ayuso	Ander Muñoz is gay and in a relationship with Omar Shanaa. Omar is gay but has to hide his sexuality from his parents due to their Muslim faith.
2018–2024	Élite	Netflix	Polo Benavent	Álvaro Rico	Polo Benavent is bisexual and polyamorous. He has a relationship with Carla and Christian in season 1 and later has a relationship with Cayetana and Valerio in season 3. He has also hooked up with Ander in season 2. Valerio Montesinos is bisexual and polyamorous. He has a relationship with Cayetana and Polo.
2018–2024	Élite	Netflix	Valerio Montesinos	Jorge López	Polo Benavent is bisexual and polyamorous. He has a relationship with Carla and Christian in season 1 and later has a relationship with Cayetana and Valerio in season 3. He has also hooked up with Ander in season 2. Valerio Montesinos is bisexual and polyamorous. He has a relationship with Cayetana and Polo.
2018–2024	Élite	Netflix	Rebeka "Rebe" de Bormujo	Claudia Salas	Rebeka "Rebe" de Bormujo is bisexual. She confesses to Ander that she is attracted to girls and guys. She was attracted to Samuel and dated him, but also said she was sexually attracted to Carla.
2018–2024	Élite	Netflix	Malick D	Leïti Sène	Malick is gay.
2018	Everything Sucks!	Netflix	Kate Messner	Peyton Kennedy	Kate Messner spends the season struggling with her sexual identity, before coming to terms that she's a lesbian. Emaline Addario might be bisexual. She is seen dating a male classmate, but then she and Kate reveal their attraction towards one another and later share a kiss.
2018	Everything Sucks!	Netflix	Emaline Addario	Sydney Sweeney	Kate Messner spends the season struggling with her sexual identity, before coming to terms that she's a lesbian. Emaline Addario might be bisexual. She is seen dating a male classmate, but then she and Kate reveal their attraction towards one another and later share a kiss.
2018–2019	For the People	ABC	Kate Littlejohn	Susannah Flood	Kate Littlejohn is lesbian and a prosecutor. Anya Ooms is lesbian and an ATF agent. Kate and Anya are involved romantically.
2018–2019	For the People	ABC	Anya Ooms	Caitlin Stasey	Kate Littlejohn is lesbian and a prosecutor. Anya Ooms is lesbian and an ATF agent. Kate and Anya are involved romantically.
2018	Giri/Haji	Netflix	Rodney	Will Sharpe	Rodney is a gay sex worker, and was in a relationship with Tiff.
2018	Giri/Haji	Netflix	Tiff	John McCrea	Tiff is Rodney's ex-boyfriend.
2018	Giri/Haji	Netflix	Taki	Aoi Okuyama	Taki is Kenzo's daughter, who befriends Rodney and eventually begins a relationship with his friend Annie.
2018	Giri/Haji	Netflix	Annie	Ellie James	Annie is Rodney's friend and Taki's love interest.
2018	Here and Now	HBO	Ramon Bayer-Boatwright	Daniel Zovatto	Ramon Bayer-Boatwright and Henry are a gay couple.
2018	Here and Now	HBO	Henry	Andy Bean	Ramon Bayer-Boatwright and Henry are a gay couple.
2018	Here and Now	HBO	Navid Shokrani	Marwan Salama	Navid Shokrani is a non-binary transgender.
2018–2019	Homecoming	Amazon Prime Video	Jacqueline Calico / Alex Eastern	Janelle Monáe	Calico and Temple are a couple.
2018–2019	Homecoming	Amazon Prime Video	Audrey Temple	Hong Chau	Calico and Temple are a couple.
2018–2020	The House of Flowers	Netflix	Julián de la Mora	Darío Yazbek Bernal	Julián de la Mora is bisexual. He was in a relationship with a woman while secretly dating Diego Olvera. Diego is gay.
2018–2020	The House of Flowers	Netflix	Diego Olvera	Juan Pablo Medina	Julián de la Mora is bisexual. He was in a relationship with a woman while secretly dating Diego Olvera. Diego is gay.
2018–2020	The House of Flowers	Netflix	María José Riquelme	Paco León	María José (formerly José María Riquelme) is a transgender woman that was married to Paulina de la Mora before transitioning. She remarried Paulina in the final episode of season 3. Paulina is pansexual. She was married to María José before she transitioned. After splitting up, she dated Alejo Salvat before reuniting with, and remarrying, María José. Kim is pansexual. She starts a relationship with María José.
2018–2020	The House of Flowers	Netflix	Paulina de la Mora	Cecilia Suárez	María José (formerly José María Riquelme) is a transgender woman that was married to Paulina de la Mora before transitioning. She remarried Paulina in the final episode of season 3. Paulina is pansexual. She was married to María José before she transitioned. After splitting up, she dated Alejo Salvat before reuniting with, and remarrying, María José. Kim is pansexual. She starts a relationship with María José.
2018–2020	The House of Flowers	Netflix	Kim	Cristina Umaña	María José (formerly José María Riquelme) is a transgender woman that was married to Paulina de la Mora before transitioning. She remarried Paulina in the final episode of season 3. Paulina is pansexual. She was married to María José before she transitioned. After splitting up, she dated Alejo Salvat before reuniting with, and remarrying, María José. Kim is pansexual. She starts a relationship with María José.
2018–2020	The House of Flowers	Netflix	Pato Lascuraín	Christian Chávez	Pato Lascuraín is a gay man and a drag queen. He is murdered for his sexuality. Agustín Corcuera is a closeted gay man. He kills Pato after the latter tries to expose their relationship.
2018–2020	The House of Flowers	Netflix	Agustín Corcuera	Emilio Cuaik	Pato Lascuraín is a gay man and a drag queen. He is murdered for his sexuality. Agustín Corcuera is a closeted gay man. He kills Pato after the latter tries to expose their relationship.
2018–2019	Impulse	YouTube Premium	Jenna Faith Hope	Sarah Desjardins	Jenna comes to term with the realization that she's lesbian, then is outed to her parents by her friend (season 2). Kate is a young woman that Jenna meets at a college party during a poetry performance and Kate kisses Jenna afterwards. Megan Linderman is queer.
2018–2019	Impulse	YouTube Premium	Kate	Sarah Swire	Jenna comes to term with the realization that she's lesbian, then is outed to her parents by her friend (season 2). Kate is a young woman that Jenna meets at a college party during a poetry performance and Kate kisses Jenna afterwards. Megan Linderman is queer.
2018–2019	Impulse	YouTube Premium	Megan Linderman	Lauren Collins	Jenna comes to term with the realization that she's lesbian, then is outed to her parents by her friend (season 2). Kate is a young woman that Jenna meets at a college party during a poetry performance and Kate kisses Jenna afterwards. Megan Linderman is queer.
2018	The Innocents	Netflix	Lil	Sabrina Bartlett	Lil kisses June. (She may be lesbian or bisexual.) Kam has a boyfriend, but is also involved with women. (She appears to be bisexual.) Sigrid has feelings for a woman back home. (She may be lesbian or bisexual.)
2018	The Innocents	Netflix	Kam	Abigail Hardingham	Lil kisses June. (She may be lesbian or bisexual.) Kam has a boyfriend, but is also involved with women. (She appears to be bisexual.) Sigrid has feelings for a woman back home. (She may be lesbian or bisexual.)
2018	The Innocents	Netflix	Sigrid	Lise Risom Olsen	Lil kisses June. (She may be lesbian or bisexual.) Kam has a boyfriend, but is also involved with women. (She appears to be bisexual.) Sigrid has feelings for a woman back home. (She may be lesbian or bisexual.)
2018–2019	Insatiable	Netflix	Bob Barnard	Christopher Gorham	Bob Barnard claims to enjoy sex with women but self-identifies as gay. He has been in love with Bob Armstrong since they were teenagers.
2018–2019	Insatiable	Netflix	Bob Armstrong	Dallas Roberts	Bob Armstrong self-identifies as bisexual.
2018–2019	Insatiable	Netflix	Nonnie Thompson	Kimmy Shields	Nonnie is a closeted lesbian.
2018–2019	Insatiable	Netflix	Deborah "Dee" Marshall	Ashley D. Kelley	Dee is a lesbian.
2018–2019	Instinct	CBS	Dylan Reinhart	Alan Cumming	Dylan Reinhart is gay. A former CIA operative-turned-university professor and best-selling author now helping the New York Police Department. Andy Wilson is gay. Dylan and Andy are married.
2018–2019	Instinct	CBS	Andy Wilson	Daniel Ings	Dylan Reinhart is gay. A former CIA operative-turned-university professor and best-selling author now helping the New York Police Department. Andy Wilson is gay. Dylan and Andy are married.
2018–2022	Killing Eve	BBC America	Villanelle	Jodie Comer	Villanelle is a bisexual assassin. She has sex with women and men, had a brief relationship with her neighbor Sebastian, fake married a woman, and is in love with Eve. In episode "You're Mine" (season 2, episode 8), Villanelle asks Eve to run away with her. When Eve rejects her, Villanelle shoots Eve. They finally end up together in the last season finale.
2018–2022	Killing Eve	BBC America	Eve Polastri	Sandra Oh	Eve Polastri appears to be bisexual. While married to her husband, she reveals an attraction towards Villanelle, even though they are rivals and that their cat-and-mouse relationship contains violence and obsession. In episode "Meetings Have Biscuits" (season 3, episode 3), Eve finally kisses Villanelle for the first time. Late in Season 4, Eve and Villanelle finally have sex.
2018–2022	Killing Eve	BBC America	Bill Pargrave	David Haig	Bill Pargrave is pansexual. He said he just falls in love with whoever he falls in love with. He chose to enter into a heterosexual marriage by arrangement because he wanted to father a child, and occasionally has sex with his wife who knows about his history with men.
2018–2022	Killing Eve	BBC America	Hélène	Camille Cottin	Hélène is one of the high-ranking members of the Twelve organization, she is a lesbian with a child. She's seen going on dates with women, before she starts a mind-game dynamic with Eve that ends with them kissing in episode "It's Agony and I'm Ravenous" (season, 4, episode 4).
2018–2019	Krypton	SyFy	Adam Strange	Shaun Sipos	Adam Strange is quite likely bisexual. In season 1, episode "House of Zod", Adam Strange appreciates the view of the bare ass of a tattooed male Sagitari.
2018–2019	Krypton	SyFy	Nyssa-Vex	Wallis Day	Nyssa is bisexual and was in a same-sex relationship in the past.
2018–2022	Legacies	The CW	Josie Saltzman	Kaylee Bryant	Josie is pansexual. She was in a relationship with Penelope. Afterwards, she had a crush on Rafael and kissed him. She later dates Landon Kirby. She also had a crush on Hope. After this, she develops a crush on Jade.
2018–2022	Legacies	The CW	Penelope Park	Lulu Antariksa	Penelope is bisexual. She was in a relationship with Josie, and before Penelope left to attend a witches school she and Josie acknowledged that they loved each other. She also kissed MG.
2018–2022	Legacies	The CW	Hope Mikaelson	Danielle Rose Russell	Hope is bisexual. She was in a relationship with Landon and in season two admits that she had a crush on Josie when they were fourteen.
2018–2022	Legacies	The CW	Lizzie Saltzman	Jenny Boyd	Lizzie is attracted to women. During episode 12 of season 1, when Josie confesses her crush on Hope, she tells Lizzie "Every time I ever liked anyone, you go for them, and you always win." This implies that Lizzie showed attraction to Josie's past romantic interests, and that Josie was afraid Lizzie would do the same with Hope.
2018–2022	Legacies	The CW	Jade	Giorgia Whigham	Jade is bisexual. She has a budding romance with Josie.
2018–2022	Legacies	The CW	Maya Machado	Bianca A Santos	Maya is a lesbian. She was in a relationship with Finch. She also had a crush on both Hope and Josie.
2018–2022	Legacies	The CW	Finch Tarrayo	Courtney Bandeko	Finch is a lesbian. She dated Maya and is now dating Josie.
2018	Life Sentence	The CW	Ida Abbott	Gillian Vigman	Ida is bisexual. She leaves her husband to be with her friend, Poppy.
2018	Life Sentence	The CW	Poppy	Claudia Rocafort	Ida is bisexual. She leaves her husband to be with her friend, Poppy.
2018–2019	Light as a Feather	Hulu	Alex Portnoy	Brianne Tju	Alex is lesbian.
2018–2019	Light as a Feather	Hulu	Peri	Adriyan Rae	Peri is lesbian.
2018–2023	Manifest	NBC (season 1–3); Netflix (season 4)	Bethany Collins	Mugga	Bethany is lesbian and a flight attendant on Flight 828.
2018–2023	Manifest	NBC (season 1–3); Netflix (season 4)	Georgia Collins	Eva Kaminsky	Georgia is lesbian and married to Bethany.
2018–2023	Manifest	NBC (season 1–3); Netflix (season 4)	Thomas	Sheldon Best	Thomas is gay and smuggled on Flight 828 to escape homophobic persecution in Jamaica.
2018	McMafia	BBC One; AMC	Semiyon Kleiman	David Strathairn	Semiyon is gay. He had a younger male lover.
2018	My Brother's Husband	NHK BS Premium	Mike Flanagan	Baruto Kaito	Mike is the Canadian husband of Yaichi's dead brother Ryōji, who visits Japan to learn about his late husband's past and family. Mike is kind and gentle, contrasting with his muscular and bearish appearance. He is proudly gay and frequently wears t-shirts that feature LGBT iconography, such as the rainbow flag and pink triangle.
2018–2023	New Amsterdam	NBC	Iggy Frome	Tyler Labine	Iggy Frome and Martin McIntyre are married and have adopted three children from Bangladesh.
2018–2023	New Amsterdam	NBC	Martin McIntyre	Mike Doyle	Iggy Frome and Martin McIntyre are married and have adopted three children from Bangladesh.
2018–2023	New Amsterdam	NBC	Leyla Shinwari	Shiva Kalaiselvan	Leyla, a practicing doctor who immigrated to the United States, is a resident at New Amsterdam hospital. Leyla & Lauren were in a relationship. They broke up when it was revealed that Lauren paid New Amsterdam a bribe to create Leyla a resident spot at the hospital.
2018–2023	New Amsterdam	NBC	Lauren Bloom	Janet Montgomery	Lauren is the director of the New Amsterdam ED, and her sexuality has not been directly stated. However, she was in a committed relationship with resident Leyla Shinwari.
2018–2023	New Amsterdam	NBC	Margot	Lauren Ridloff	Margot is a deaf woman who is having issues with her girlfriend since getting a cochlear implant.
2018	The Novelist	Fuji TV	Kazumi Haruhiko	Izuka Kenta	Kazumi Haruhiko and Kijima Rio are a gay couple.
2018	The Novelist	Fuji TV	Kijima Rio	Takezai Terunosuke	Kazumi Haruhiko and Kijima Rio are a gay couple.
2018	Origin	YouTube Premium	Agnes "Lee" Lebachi	Adelayo Adedayo	Agnes "Lee" Lebachi is a lesbian.
2018	Origin	YouTube Premium	Baum Arndt	Philipp Christopher	
2018	Origin	YouTube Premium	Evelyn Rey	Nora Arnezeder	Evelyn Rey is bisexual.
2018	Picnic at Hanging Rock	Showcase (AU)	Michael Fitzhubert	Harrison Gilbertson	Michael Fitzhubert is in love with Albert Crundall. Irma Leopold kisses Miranda Reid. Greta McGraw is a geography teacher whose father exiled her from home for being a lesbian. Marion Quade is lesbian. Greta and Marion are in a relationship.
2018	Picnic at Hanging Rock	Showcase (AU)	Irma Leopold	Samara Weaving	Michael Fitzhubert is in love with Albert Crundall. Irma Leopold kisses Miranda Reid. Greta McGraw is a geography teacher whose father exiled her from home for being a lesbian. Marion Quade is lesbian. Greta and Marion are in a relationship.
2018	Picnic at Hanging Rock	Showcase (AU)	Miranda Reid	Lily Sullivan	Michael Fitzhubert is in love with Albert Crundall. Irma Leopold kisses Miranda Reid. Greta McGraw is a geography teacher whose father exiled her from home for being a lesbian. Marion Quade is lesbian. Greta and Marion are in a relationship.
2018	Picnic at Hanging Rock	Showcase (AU)	Greta McGraw	Anna McGahan	Michael Fitzhubert is in love with Albert Crundall. Irma Leopold kisses Miranda Reid. Greta McGraw is a geography teacher whose father exiled her from home for being a lesbian. Marion Quade is lesbian. Greta and Marion are in a relationship.
2018	Picnic at Hanging Rock	Showcase (AU)	Marion Quade	Madeleine Madden	Michael Fitzhubert is in love with Albert Crundall. Irma Leopold kisses Miranda Reid. Greta McGraw is a geography teacher whose father exiled her from home for being a lesbian. Marion Quade is lesbian. Greta and Marion are in a relationship.
2018–2019	Playing for Keeps	Network Ten	Rusty O'Reilly	Ethan Panizza	Rusty O'Reilly is gay. He and Jack Davies were having an affair before Jack's death.
2018–2019	Playing for Keeps	Network Ten	Jack Davies	James Mason	Rusty O'Reilly is gay. He and Jack Davies were having an affair before Jack's death.
2018–2019	Playing for Keeps	Network Ten	Tahlia Woods	Olympia Valance	Tahlia Woods is bisexual.
2018–2019	Playing for Keeps	Network Ten	Hayley Fawkner	Alexandra Adornetto	Hayley Fawkner is a lesbian.
2018–2021	Pose	FX	Blanca Rodriguez-Evangelista	Mj Rodriguez	Blanca is a transgender woman.
2018–2021	Pose	FX	Angel Evangelista	Indya Moore	Angel is a transgender woman.
2018–2021	Pose	FX	Elektra Abundance	Dominique Jackson	Elektra is a transgender woman.
2018–2021	Pose	FX	Pray Tell	Billy Porter	Pray is gay.
2018–2021	Pose	FX	Damon Richards-Evangelista	Ryan Jamaal Swain	Damon is gay.
2018–2021	Pose	FX	Ricky Evangelista	Dyllón Burnside	Ricky is gay and Damon's boyfriend.
2018–2021	Pose	FX	Candy Abundance	Angelica Ross	Candy is a transgender woman.
2018–2021	Pose	FX	Lulu Abundance	Hailie Sahar	Lulu is a transgender woman. Lil Papi described himself as an "equal opportunity lover".
2018	Rise	NBC	Simon Saunders	Ted Sutherland	Simon Saunders is a closeted gay student raised by a very conservative religious family. Jeremy is Simon's co-star in the play, and potential love interest. Michael Hallowell is transgender.
2018	Rise	NBC	Michael Hallowell	Ellie Desautels	Simon Saunders is a closeted gay student raised by a very conservative religious family. Jeremy is Simon's co-star in the play, and potential love interest. Michael Hallowell is transgender.
2018	Rise	NBC	Jeremy	Sean Grandillo	Simon Saunders is a closeted gay student raised by a very conservative religious family. Jeremy is Simon's co-star in the play, and potential love interest. Michael Hallowell is transgender.
2018–	The Rookie	ABC	Jackson West	Titus Makin Jr.	Jackson West is gay. He's a rookie police officer and the son of a high-ranking police official. Gino Brown is gay. He is a nurse and in a relationship with Jackson West. Jackson: 54 episodes, S01 - S03 Gino: 3 episodes
2018–	The Rookie	ABC	Gino Brown	Cameron J. Armstrong	Jackson West is gay. He's a rookie police officer and the son of a high-ranking police official. Gino Brown is gay. He is a nurse and in a relationship with Jackson West. Jackson: 54 episodes, S01 - S03 Gino: 3 episodes
2018–	The Rookie	ABC	Sterling Freeman	Daniel Lissing	4 episodes
2018–	The Rookie	ABC	Simone Clark	Niecy Nash	4 episodes => The Rookie: Feds (main cast)
2018–	The Rookie	ABC	Casey Fox	Kat Foster	2 episodes
2018	Safe	Canal 8 Netflix	Pete Mayfield	Marc Warren	Pete is gay.
2018	Seven Seconds	Netflix	Kadeuce Porter	Corey Champagne	Kadeuce Porter and Brenton Butler were in a relationship before Brenton was killed by a white cop who ran over him in a hit and run.
2018	Seven Seconds	Netflix	Brenton Butler	Daykwon Gaines	Kadeuce Porter and Brenton Butler were in a relationship before Brenton was killed by a white cop who ran over him in a hit and run.
2018–2020	Siren	Freeform	Ryn	Eline Powell	Ryn is a bisexual mermaid. She is attracted to both Maddie and her boyfriend Ben. Maddie Bishop is revealed to be bisexual, as she is receptive to Ryn's attraction for her.
2018–2020	Siren	Freeform	Maddie Bishop	Fola Evans-Akingbola	Ryn is a bisexual mermaid. She is attracted to both Maddie and her boyfriend Ben. Maddie Bishop is revealed to be bisexual, as she is receptive to Ryn's attraction for her.
2018–2019	SKAM Austin	Facebook Watch	Shay Dixon	La'Keisha Slade	Shay Dixon is a lesbian. Tyler Nunez is gay and Shay's best friend.
2018–2019	SKAM Austin	Facebook Watch	Tyler Nunez	Giovanni Niubo	Shay Dixon is a lesbian. Tyler Nunez is gay and Shay's best friend.
2018–2024	Skam Italia	TIMvision, Netflix	Martino Rametta	Federico Cesari	Martino is gay. Season 2 centers around him and his coming-out journey.
2018–2019	Sorry for Your Loss	Facebook Watch	Jules Shaw	Kelly Marie Tran	Jules falls in love with a girl named Tommy.
2018–2024	Station 19	ABC	Travis Montgomery	Jay Hayden	Travis is a gay firefighter.
2018–2024	Station 19	ABC	Emmett Dixon	Lachlan Buchanan	Emmett Dixon is gay, and is in an off-and-on relationship with Travis.
2018–2024	Station 19	ABC	Maya Bishop	Danielle Savre	Maya is a bisexual firefighter. Maya later meets, falls in love, marries and have kids with doctor Carina DeLuca
2018–2024	Station 19	ABC	Dr. Carina DeLuca	Stefania Spampinato	Carina is a bisexual doctor. Carina later meets, falls in love, marries and have kids with firefighter Maya Bishop
2018–2022	Step Up: High Water	YouTube Premium (season 1–2); Starz (season 3)	Tal Baker	Petrice Jones	Tal Baker is gay. Keiynan Lonsdale took over the role in season 3.
2018–2022	Step Up: High Water	YouTube Premium (season 1–2); Starz (season 3)	Tal Baker	Keiynan Lonsdale	Tal Baker is gay. Keiynan Lonsdale took over the role in season 3.
2018–2019	Sweetbitter	Starz	Ariel	Eden Epstein	Ariel is a lesbian and a womanizer. Sasha is a gay Russian immigrant.
2018–2019	Sweetbitter	Starz	Sasha	Daniyar	Ariel is a lesbian and a womanizer. Sasha is a gay Russian immigrant.
2018–	This Close	SundanceNow	Michael	Josh Feldman	Michael is a graphic novelist, and Ryan is a real estate agent. The series starts after their engagement to be married is broken.
2018–	This Close	SundanceNow	Ryan	Colt Prattes	Michael is a graphic novelist, and Ryan is a real estate agent. The series starts after their engagement to be married is broken.
2018–2023	Titans	DC Universe (seasons 1–2); HBO Max (season 3–4)	Tim Drake / Robin	Jay Lycurgo	Tim is bisexual.
2018–2020	Vida	Starz	Emma Hernandez	Mishel Prada	Emma is bisexual.
2018–2020	Vida	Starz	Eddy Martínez	Ser Anzoategui	Eddy is a lesbian.
2018–2020	Vida	Starz	Cruz	Maria-Elena Laas	Cruz is lesbian.
2018–2020	Vida	Starz	Sam	Michelle Badillo	Sam is non-binary.
2018–2025	You	Lifetime (season 1); Netflix (season 2–5)	Peach Salinger	Shay Mitchell	Peach Salinger is a lesbian.
2018–2025	You	Lifetime (season 1); Netflix (season 2–5)	Forty	James Scully	Forty is sexually fluid and an aspiring but troubled filmmaker.
2018–2025	You	Lifetime (season 1); Netflix (season 2–5)	Lucy	Marielle Scott	Lucy is lesbian and a literary agent in L.A. married to Sunrise. Sunrise, Lucy's wife, is lesbian and a stay-at-home lifestyle blogger.
2018–2025	You	Lifetime (season 1); Netflix (season 2–5)	Sunrise	Melanie Field	Lucy is lesbian and a literary agent in L.A. married to Sunrise. Sunrise, Lucy's wife, is lesbian and a stay-at-home lifestyle blogger.
2018–2025	You	Lifetime (season 1); Netflix (season 2–5)	Sherry	Shalita Grant	Sherry and Cary are a bisexual couple who have polyamorous relationships with various people.
2018–2025	You	Lifetime (season 1); Netflix (season 2–5)	Cary	Travis Van Winkle	Sherry and Cary are a bisexual couple who have polyamorous relationships with various people.
2018–2025	You	Lifetime (season 1); Netflix (season 2–5)	Dante	Ben Mehl	Dante is gay and a former war veteran who lives in Madre Linda with his husband Lansing and their two children.
2018–2025	You	Lifetime (season 1); Netflix (season 2–5)	Lansing	Noel Arthur	Dante is gay and a former war veteran who lives in Madre Linda with his husband Lansing and their two children.
2018–2025	You	Lifetime (season 1); Netflix (season 2–5)	Andrew	Christopher O'Shea	Andrew is gay and a stay-at-home dad in Madre Linda married to Jackson. Jackson, Andrew's husband, is gay and a tech attorney.
2018–2025	You	Lifetime (season 1); Netflix (season 2–5)	Jackson	Bryan Safi	Andrew is gay and a stay-at-home dad in Madre Linda married to Jackson. Jackson, Andrew's husband, is gay and a tech attorney.
2018–2025	You	Lifetime (season 1); Netflix (season 2–5)	Adam	Lukas Gage	Adam is pansexual and is dating Phoebe.

== 2019 ==
Year	Show	Network	Character	Actor	Notes
2019	3 Will Be Free	One 31; Line TV	Shin	Tay Tawan	Shin is gay.
2019	3 Will Be Free	One 31; Line TV	Neo	Joss Way-ar	Neo is bisexual.
2019	3 Will Be Free	One 31; Line TV	Mae	Jennie Panhan	Mae is a trans woman.
2019–2023	All Rise	CBS; OWN	Judge Lisa Benner	Marg Helgenberger	Lisa is lesbian and mentor of Judge Lola Carmichael. She waited until same-sex marriage became legal to implement Wedding Day at the courthouse. Lisa had been in a four-year relationship when her girlfriend left her on that special day.
2019–2021	Another Life	Netflix	Zayne	JayR Tinaco	Zayne is non-binary.
2019–2021	Another Life	Netflix	Bernie Martinez	A.J. Rivera	Bernie dates Zayne.
2019–2022	Batwoman	The CW	Kate Kane	Ruby Rose	Kate Kane is the lesbian cousin of Bruce Wayne.
2019–2022	Batwoman	The CW	Sophie Moore	Meagan Tandy	Sophie Moore is lesbian and Kate's former girlfriend. After breaking up with Kate and denying her sexuality, she married Tyler. Sophie comes to terms with being lesbian, tells her husband about her past relationship with Kate, ends her marriage, and comes out to her mother.
2019–2022	Batwoman	The CW	Julia Pennyworth	Christina Wolfe	Julia Pennyworth is lesbian, Kate's ex-girlfriend, and a British spy. Batwoman is the first lesbian superhero to forefront a prime time series.
2019–2022	Batwoman	The CW	Ryan Wilder	Javicia Leslie	Ryan Wilder is a black lesbian. Javicia Leslie took over the role of Batwoman is season two.
2019–2022	Batwoman	The CW	Angelique Martin	Bevin Bru	Angelique Martin is a lesbian. She is Ryan's drug-dealing ex-girlfriend.
2019–2022	Batwoman	The CW	Safiyah Sohail	Shivani Ghai	Safiyah Sohail is a lesbian. She is Queen of the pirate nation of Coryana.
2019–2022	Batwoman	The CW	Tatiana	Leah Gibson	Tatiana is a lesbian. She is an assassin known as The Whisper.
2019–2022	Batwoman	The CW	Evan Blake	Lincoln Clauss	Evan Blake is a non-binary queer. They are an art thief known as Wolf Spider.
2019–2022	Batwoman	The CW	Reagan	Brianne Howey	Reagan is a lesbian. She is a bartender.
2019–2022	Batwoman	The CW	Gina	Favour Onosemuede	Gina is a lesbian. She is Parker Torres' girlfriend.
2019–2022	Batwoman	The CW	Parker Torres	Malia Pyles	Parker Torres is a lesbian. She becomes the Terrier and blackmails Gotham.
2019–2022	Batwoman	The CW	Sara Lance	Caity Lotz	Sara Lance is bisexual. She had a guest appearance in 2019, episode "Crisis on Infinite Earths".
2019	Bluff City Law	NBC	Della Bedford	Jayne Atkinson	Della is lesbian. She comes out after ending her 15-year marriage.
2019–2021	Bonding	Netflix	Pete	Brendan Scannell	Pete is an openly gay man who becomes an assistant to his dominatrix friend.
2019–2021	Bonding	Netflix	Josh	Theo Stockman	Josh is gay and Pete's boyfriend.
2019–2026	The Boys	Amazon Prime Video	Ezekiel	Shaun Benson	Ezekiel is a closeted homosexual.
2019–2026	The Boys	Amazon Prime Video	Queen Maeve	Dominique McElligott	Queen Maeve is bisexual. She had romances with Elena and Homelander; however, she was closeted.
2019–2026	The Boys	Amazon Prime Video	Elena	Nicola Correia-Damude	Elena is lesbian and Maeve's ex-girlfriend.
2019–2026	The Boys	Amazon Prime Video	Frenchie	Tomer Capone	Frenchie is bisexual and has had relationships with men and women.
2019–2023	Carnival Row	Amazon Prime Video	Vignette Stonemoss	Cara Delevingne	Vignette Stonemoss is bisexual and a fairy. Tourmaline Larou is either bisexual or lesbian, and a fairy. Vignette and Tourmaline were once lovers and are now close friends.
2019–2023	Carnival Row	Amazon Prime Video	Tourmaline Larou	Karla Crome	Vignette Stonemoss is bisexual and a fairy. Tourmaline Larou is either bisexual or lesbian, and a fairy. Vignette and Tourmaline were once lovers and are now close friends.
2019–2023	Carnival Row	Amazon Prime Video	Costin Finch	Gregory Gudgeon	Costin Finch was a closeted gay and the Headmaster of an orphanage. Dr. Morange was a closeted gay and the coroner for the Constabulary. Costin and Morange were longtime lovers and would meet in secret at the fairy brothel.
2019–2023	Carnival Row	Amazon Prime Video	Dr. Morange	John Malafronte	Costin Finch was a closeted gay and the Headmaster of an orphanage. Dr. Morange was a closeted gay and the coroner for the Constabulary. Costin and Morange were longtime lovers and would meet in secret at the fairy brothel.
2019	The Club	Netflix	Santiago Caballero	Alejandro Puente	Santiago is gay. Max is gay. Santiago and Max are dating.
2019	The Club	Netflix	Max	Martín Saracho	Santiago is gay. Max is gay. Santiago and Max are dating.
2019–2022	Coroner	CBC	Ross Khalighi	Ehren Kassam	Ross Khalighi is gay and the teenage son of coroner Jenny Cooper. Matteo is gay and Ross's boyfriend. Ross and Matteo are dating.
2019–2022	Coroner	CBC	Matteo	Graeme Jokic	Ross Khalighi is gay and the teenage son of coroner Jenny Cooper. Matteo is gay and Ross's boyfriend. Ross and Matteo are dating.
2019–2022	Coroner	CBC	Alison Trent	Tamara Podemski	Alison Trent is lesbian and Cooper's assistant.
2019–2022	Coroner	CBC	Sabina	Jeananne Goossen	Sabina is lesbian. Alison and Sabina are dating.
2019–2022	Coroner	CBC	Taylor Kim	Alli Chung	Taylor Kim is lesbian and a detective. She told her colleague that she left home when she was 16, and lives with her girlfriend and their three dogs.
2019–2022	Coroner	CBC	River Baitz	Kiley May	River is Two Spirit. They are in a relationship with Dennis Garcia
2019–2022	Coroner	CBC	Alphonse Usmani	Shawn Ahmed	Alphonse is gay and Cooper's assistant. He begins seeing Ross in Season 4
2019	Dark Blue Kiss	GMM 25; Line TV	Pete	Tay Tawan	Pete and Kao are boyfriends. Non has a same-sex crush on Kao. Sun and Mork are gay love interests. Thai boys' love series.
2019	Dark Blue Kiss	GMM 25; Line TV	Kao	New Thitipoom	Pete and Kao are boyfriends. Non has a same-sex crush on Kao. Sun and Mork are gay love interests. Thai boys' love series.
2019	Dark Blue Kiss	GMM 25; Line TV	Non	AJ Chayapol	Pete and Kao are boyfriends. Non has a same-sex crush on Kao. Sun and Mork are gay love interests. Thai boys' love series.
2019	Dark Blue Kiss	GMM 25; Line TV	Sun	Podd Suphakorn	Pete and Kao are boyfriends. Non has a same-sex crush on Kao. Sun and Mork are gay love interests. Thai boys' love series.
2019	Dark Blue Kiss	GMM 25; Line TV	Mork	Fluke Gawin	Pete and Kao are boyfriends. Non has a same-sex crush on Kao. Sun and Mork are gay love interests. Thai boys' love series.
2019–2021	David Makes Man	OWN	Mx. Elijah	Travis Coles	Mx. Elijah is gender nonconforming.
2019–2021	David Makes Man	OWN	Femi	Trace Lysette	Femi is a trans woman.
2019–2021	David Makes Man	OWN	Star Child	Logan Rozos	Star Child is a trans man.
2019	Daybreak	Netflix	Turbo "Bro Jock" Pokaski	Cody Kearsley	Turbo is gay and is in a relationship with Wesley Fists.
2019	Daybreak	Netflix	Wesley Fists	Austin Crute	Wesley is gay and is in a relationship with Turbo.
2019–2021	Dickinson	Apple TV+	Emily Dickinson	Hailee Steinfeld	Emily Dickinson is lesbian and an aspiring poet. She is in love with Sue Gilbert, her best friend, who is bisexual.
2019–2021	Dickinson	Apple TV+	Sue Gilbert	Ella Hunt	Emily Dickinson is lesbian and an aspiring poet. She is in love with Sue Gilbert, her best friend, who is bisexual.
2019–2023	Doom Patrol	DC Universe (season 1–2); HBO Max (season 2–4)	Jane	Diane Guerrero	Jane is a lesbian.
2019–2023	Doom Patrol	DC Universe (season 1–2); HBO Max (season 2–4)	Shelley Byron / The Fog	Wynn Everett	
2019–2023	Doom Patrol	DC Universe (season 1–2); HBO Max (season 2–4)	Larry Trainor	Matt Bomer	Larry Trainor is a gay superhero. Larry and John Bowers were in a relationship before Larry's accident. When Larry is all bandaged up, he is played by actor Matthew Zuk.
2019–2023	Doom Patrol	DC Universe (season 1–2); HBO Max (season 2–4)	John Bowers	Kyle Clements	John Bowers is gay. He was having an affair with Larry Trainor before the accident.
2019–2023	Doom Patrol	DC Universe (season 1–2); HBO Max (season 2–4)	Maura Lee Karupt	Alan Mingo Jr.	Maura Lee Karupt is a trans woman.
2019–2023	Doom Patrol	DC Universe (season 1–2); HBO Max (season 2–4)	Mr. 104	Sendhil Ramamurthy	
2019–2023	Doom Patrol	DC Universe (season 1–2); HBO Max (season 2–4)	Danny the Street	N/A	Danny the Street is a sentient gender-queer street with the power to teleport themselves and their residents to any location in the world. They communicate through street signs, napkins, neon signs, and anything else they can create letters on.
2019–	Euphoria	HBO	Rue Bennett	Zendaya	Rue Bennett is queer and has a crush on Jules.
2019–	Euphoria	HBO	Jules Vaughn	Hunter Schafer	Jules is a transgender young woman.
2019–	Euphoria	HBO	Cal Jacobs	Eric Dane	Cal Jacobs is bisexual. He is married but has a secret Grindr profile.
2019–	Euphoria	HBO	TC	Bobbi Salvör Menuez	TC is non-binary.
2019–	Euphoria	HBO	Anna	Quintessa Swindell	Anna is non-binary and hooks up with Jules.
2019–2023	Five Bedrooms	Network Ten	Harry	Roy Joseph	Harry is a gay surgeon. He lives with his mother, who doesn't know he is gay.
2019–2023	Five Bedrooms	Network Ten	Pete Portelli	Adam Fiorentino	Pete Portelli is a gay cop in the neighborhood.
2019–	For All Mankind	Apple TV+	Larry Wilson	Nate Corddry	Larry is gay and works at NASA. He marries Ellen Waverly, who is a lesbian, to save his career.
2019–	For All Mankind	Apple TV+	Ellen Waverly	Jodi Balfour	Ellen Waverly is a lesbian astronaut. She likes Pam, but marries Larry, who is gay, to save her career.
2019–	For All Mankind	Apple TV+	Pam Horton	Meghan Leathers	Pam is a lesbian. She owns the bar where most of the NASA employees hang out.
2019–	For All Mankind	Apple TV+	Elise	Mele Ihara	Elise is a lesbian and Pam's girlfriend. Guest appearance.
2019–2022	Four More Shots Please!	Amazon Prime Video	Umang Singh	Bani J	Umang is bisexual.
2019–2024	The Game of Keys	Amazon Prime Video	Valentín Lombardo	Horacio Pancheri	Valentín Lombardo is gay.
2019–2024	The Game of Keys	Amazon Prime Video	Daniel	Manuel Vega	Daniel is gay and Valentín Lombardo's lover.
2019–2022	Gentleman Jack	BBC One	Anne Lister	Suranne Jones	Anne Lister and Ann Walker are a couple. Ann admits that she loves Anne.
2019–2022	Gentleman Jack	BBC One	Ann Walker	Sophie Rundle	Anne Lister and Ann Walker are a couple. Ann admits that she loves Anne.
2019–2023	Ghosts	BBC One	The Captain	Ben Willbond	A stern, closeted World War II Army officer.
2019–2020	Girls from Ipanema	Netflix	Thereza Soares	Mel Lisboa	Set in the 1950s, Thereza Soares is bisexual and married to Nelson, with whom she has an open relationship. She has an affair with female journalist Helô. Helô is lesbian.
2019–2020	Girls from Ipanema	Netflix	Helô	Thaila Ayala	Set in the 1950s, Thereza Soares is bisexual and married to Nelson, with whom she has an open relationship. She has an affair with female journalist Helô. Helô is lesbian.
2019–2026	Good Omens	Prime Video	Aziraphale	Michael Sheen	Aziraphale is a genderless angel who presents as a man. In the season two finale, it is confirmed that he is in love with the demon Crowley.
2019–2026	Good Omens	Prime Video	Crowley	David Tennant	Crowley is a genderfluid demon who presents masculinely in the present day, but has been shown to change gender presentations over time. In the season two finale, he confesses his love to Aziraphale.
2019–2026	Good Omens	Prime Video	Pollution	Lourdes Faberes	Uses singular they/them pronouns and is described by book co-author and series writer Neil Gaiman as non-binary.
2019–2026	Good Omens	Prime Video	Maggie	Maggie Service	Maggie is a record store owner and one of Aziraphale's tenants in Soho. She is a lesbian and is in love with Nina, another shopkeeper.
2019–2026	Good Omens	Prime Video	Nina	Nina Sosanya	Nina is a coffee shop owner in Soho. She is a lesbian and is romantically interested in Maggie by the end of season two.
2019–2024	Good Trouble	Freeform	Alice Kwan	Sherry Cola	Alice Kwan is lesbian.
2019–2024	Good Trouble	Freeform	Gael	Tommy Martinez	Gael is bisexual.
2019–2024	Good Trouble	Freeform	Bryan	Michael Galante	Bryan is gay. He and Gael date.
2019–2024	Good Trouble	Freeform	Elijah Adrieux	Denim Richards	Elijah Adrieux is Gael's ex-boyfriend.
2019–2024	Good Trouble	Freeform	Jazmin Martinez	Hailie Sahar	Jazmin Martinez is a trans woman.
2019–2024	Good Trouble	Freeform	Joey	Daisy Eagan	Joey is non-binary.
2019–2024	Good Trouble	Freeform	Lena Adams Foster	Sherri Saum	Lena Adams Foster is a lesbian.
2019–2024	Good Trouble	Freeform	Lindsay Brady	River Butcher	Lindsay Brady is non-binary and queer.
2019–2024	Good Trouble	Freeform	Meera Mattei	Briana Venskus	Meera Mattei is a lesbian.
2019–2024	Good Trouble	Freeform	Stef Adams Foster	Teri Polo	Stef Adams Foster is a lesbian.
2019–2024	Good Trouble	Freeform	Sumi	Kara Wang	Sumi is a lesbian.
2019–2024	Good Trouble	Freeform	Shaun	Kye Tamm	Shaun is a trans man.
2019–2024	Good Trouble	Freeform	Ruby	Shannon Chan-Kent	Ruby is a lesbian.
2019–2024	Good Trouble	Freeform	Sydney	Caitlin Kimball	Sydney is a lesbian.
2019–2024	Good Trouble	Freeform	Shai Floraz	Anisha Jagannathan	Shai Floraz is queer.
2019	Grand Hotel	ABC	Yolanda ("Yoli") Renna	Justina Adorno	Yolanda ("Yoli") Renna is queer. She was in a relationship with Sky Garibaldi before Marisa.
2019	Grand Hotel	ABC	Sky Garibaldi	Arielle Kebbel	Sky Garibaldi is a lesbian and a cook at the hotel. She was murdered during a hurricane.
2019	Grand Hotel	ABC	Marisa	Sabrina Texidor	Marisa is a lesbian and also works at the hotel.
2019	Handsome Stewardess	GagaOOLala	Meng	Huang Pei-jia	Meng falls in love with another member of cabin crew — a stewardess. Singapore's first TV series to feature a lesbian couple.
2019–2023	High School Musical: The Musical: The Series	Disney+	Big Red	Larry Saperstein	Big Red is bisexual.
2019–2023	High School Musical: The Musical: The Series	Disney+	Ashlyn Caswell	Julia Lester	Caswell is bisexual.
2019–2023	High School Musical: The Musical: The Series	Disney+	Carlos Rodriguez	Frankie Rodriguez	Carlos and Seb are boyfriends.
2019–2023	High School Musical: The Musical: The Series	Disney+	Seb Matthew-Smith	Joe Serafini	Carlos and Seb are boyfriends.
2019–2023	High School Musical: The Musical: The Series	Disney+	Carol Salazar-Roberts	Nicole Sullivan	Carol and Dana are Nini's mothers.
2019–2023	High School Musical: The Musical: The Series	Disney+	Dana Salazar-Roberts	Michelle Noh	Carol and Dana are Nini's mothers.
2019	The I-Land	Netflix	Blair	Sibylla Deen	Blair was married to a woman.
2019–2022	In the Dark	The CW	Jess Damon	Brooke Markham	Jess is a lesbian veterinarian. She's the roommate and best friend of Murphy Mason. Jess and Vanessa are in a romantic relationship and they admit that they love each other. Vanessa is either lesbian or bisexual. They break up after Jess cheats on Vanessa.
2019–2022	In the Dark	The CW	Vanessa	Humberly González	Jess is a lesbian veterinarian. She's the roommate and best friend of Murphy Mason. Jess and Vanessa are in a romantic relationship and they admit that they love each other. Vanessa is either lesbian or bisexual. They break up after Jess cheats on Vanessa.
2019–2022	In the Dark	The CW	Sam	Cortni Vaughn Joyner	Sam is a butch lesbian henchwoman and liquidator.
2019–2022	In the Dark	The CW	Sterling	Natalie Liconti	Sterling is lesbian and Sam's girlfriend. She infiltrates Guiding Hope as a kennel assistant and dates Jess to gain her trust while keeping an eye on everyone.
2019	The InBetween	NBC	Tom Hackett	Paul Blackthorne	Tom Hackett is a gay detective in the Seattle police department and married to Brian Currie, a gay therapist.
2019	The InBetween	NBC	Brian Currie	Michael B. Silver	Brian Currie is a gay therapist, married to Tom Hackett.
2019–2023	The L Word: Generation Q	Showtime	Bette Porter	Jennifer Beals	Bette is lesbian.
2019–2023	The L Word: Generation Q	Showtime	Shane McCutcheon	Katherine Moennig	Shane is lesbian.
2019–2023	The L Word: Generation Q	Showtime	Alice Pieszecki	Leisha Hailey	Alice is bisexual.
2019–2023	The L Word: Generation Q	Showtime	Dani Núñez	Arienne Mandi	Dani is lesbian.
2019–2023	The L Word: Generation Q	Showtime	Sophie Suarez	Rosanny Zayas	Sophie is lesbian. Dani and Sophie are engaged.
2019–2023	The L Word: Generation Q	Showtime	Gigi Ghorbani	Sepideh Moafi	Gigi is lesbian.
2019–2023	The L Word: Generation Q	Showtime	Micah Lee	Leo Sheng	Micah is a trans man.
2019–2023	The L Word: Generation Q	Showtime	Sarah Finley	Jacqueline Toboni	Sarah is lesbian.
2019–2023	The L Word: Generation Q	Showtime	José	Freddy Miyares	José is gay.
2019–2023	The L Word: Generation Q	Showtime	Angelica Porter-Kennard	Jordan Hull	Angelica Porter-Kennard is not straight.
2019–2023	The L Word: Generation Q	Showtime	Felicity Adams	Latarsha Rose	Felicity Adams is a lesbian.
2019–2023	The L Word: Generation Q	Showtime	Jordi	Sophie Giannamore	Jordi is not straight.
2019–2023	The L Word: Generation Q	Showtime	Lena	Mercedes Mason	Lena is a lesbian.
2019–2023	The L Word: Generation Q	Showtime	Natalie Bailey	Stephanie Allynne	Natalie Bailey is a lesbian.
2019–2023	The L Word: Generation Q	Showtime	Pierce Williams	Brian Michael Smith	Pierce Williams is a trans man.
2019–2023	The L Word: Generation Q	Showtime	Quiara Thompson	Lex Scott Davis	Quiara Thompson is a lesbian.
2019–2023	The L Word: Generation Q	Showtime	Rebecca	Olivia Thirlby	Rebecca is bisexual.
2019–2023	The L Word: Generation Q	Showtime	Tess Van De Berg	Jamie Clayton	Tess Van De Berg is a lesbian.
2019–2023	The L Word: Generation Q	Showtime	Heather	Fortune Feimster	Heather is a lesbian.
2019–2023	The L Word: Generation Q	Showtime	Roxane Gay	Roxane Gay	Roxane Gay is bisexual. Guest character.
2019–2023	The L Word: Generation Q	Showtime	Maya Stevenson	Tamara Taylor	Maya Stevenson is not straight. Guest character.
2019–2023	The L Word: Generation Q	Showtime	Tina Kennard	Laurel Holloman	Tina Kennard is bisexual. Guest character.
2019–2023	The L Word: Generation Q	Showtime	Megan Rapinoe	Megan Rapinoe	Megan Rapinoe is a lesbian. Guest character.
2019–2023	The L Word: Generation Q	Showtime	Zoe	Ashley Gallegos	Zoe is a lesbian. Guest character.
2019	Limetown	Facebook Watch	Lia Haddock	Jessica Biel	Lia is a lesbian journalist investigating the disappearance of the population of a small Appalachian town. Lia's girlfriend is lesbian.
2019	Limetown	Facebook Watch	Lia's girlfriend	Kandyse McClure	Lia is a lesbian journalist investigating the disappearance of the population of a small Appalachian town. Lia's girlfriend is lesbian.
2019–2023	Made In Heaven	Amazon Prime Video	Karan Mehra	Arjun Mathur	Karan is a gay wedding planner in Delhi.
2019–2021	Merlí: Sapere Aude	Movistar+	Pol Rubio	Carlos Cuevas	Pol Rubio comes out as bisexual. Bruno Bergeron is gay. Pol and Bruno have a complicated romance, extended from the previous TV series, Merlí.
2019–2021	Merlí: Sapere Aude	Movistar+	Bruno Bergeron	David Solans	Pol Rubio comes out as bisexual. Bruno Bergeron is gay. Pol and Bruno have a complicated romance, extended from the previous TV series, Merlí.
2019–2021	Merlí: Sapere Aude	Movistar+	Otilia	Clàudia Vega	Otilia is a lesbian. Amy O'Connor is a lesbian. Otilia and Amy hook up at a party.
2019–2021	Merlí: Sapere Aude	Movistar+	Amy O'Connor	Lesley Grant	Otilia is a lesbian. Amy O'Connor is a lesbian. Otilia and Amy hook up at a party.
2019–2021	Merlí: Sapere Aude	Movistar+	Axel	Jordi Coll	Pol and Axel start dating in season 2.
2019–	The Morning Show	Apple TV+	Bradley Jackson	Reese Witherspoon	Bradley Jackson is bisexual and in the closet.
2019–	The Morning Show	Apple TV+	Laura Peterson	Julianna Margulies	Laura Peterson is a lesbian who begins dating Bradley in Season 2.
2019–2023	Nancy Drew	The CW	Bess Marvin	Maddison Jaizani	Bess Marvin is a lesbian and a waitress at The Bayside Claw. She develops a romantic interest in Lisbeth.
2019–2023	Nancy Drew	The CW	Lisbeth	Katie Findlay	Lisbeth is a lesbian and a state police officer working undercover as a driver and transporter. Lisbeth tells Bess that she really likes her.
2019–2023	Nancy Drew	The CW	Addy Soctomah	Rachel Colwell	(Season 3) Addy is a lesbian and a STEM counselor working at the Horseshoe Bay youth center. She becomes involved in a relationship with Bess.
2019	No Good Nick	Netflix	Jeremy Thompson	Kalama Epstein	Jeremy is gay. He kisses Eric and comes out as gay to his family.
2019	No Good Nick	Netflix	Eric	Gus Kamp	Eric is gay. He tells Jeremy that his family already knew he was gay before coming out to them.
2019	Now Apocalypse	Starz	Ulysses Zane	Avan Jogia	Ulysses is bisexual or gay. Stoned and paranoid is pretty much his default mode.
2019	Now Apocalypse	Starz	Gabriel	Tyler Posey	Gabriel is gay. Gabriel goes on a date with Ulysses and then they swap handjobs in an alleyway.
2019	Now Apocalypse	Starz	Isaac	Jacob Artist	Isaac is gay, and hooks up with Ulysses.
2019	Osmosis	Netflix	Lucas Apert	Stéphane Pitti	Lucas is gay. He uses Osmosis, a beta dating app, in the hope that it will help him with his boyfriend and to stop cheating.
2019	Osmosis	Netflix	Billie Tual	Yuming Hey	Billie is a genderqueer scientist that uses the pronouns she/her.
2019–2020	Pandora	The CW	Jacqueline "Jax" Zhou	Priscilla Quintana	Jax is bisexual.
2019–2020	Pandora	The CW	Cordelia Fried	Isabelle Bonfrer	Cordelia Fried is a lesbian.
2019–2020	Pandora	The CW	Atria Nine	Raechelle Banno	Atria Nine is pansexual.
2019–2020	Pandora	The CW	Aleka	Elizabeth Hammerton	Aleka is pansexual.
2019–2020	The Politician	Netflix	Payton Hobart	Ben Platt	Payton Hobart is bisexual. He initially identifies as straight and dates his classmate Alice Charles, but he develops a romantic relationship with his male classmate River Barkley and even has a threesome with River and his girlfriend Astrid Sloan. He and Alice later enter a short-lived polyamorous relationship with Astrid before getting married.
2019–2020	The Politician	Netflix	River Barkley	David Corenswet	Payton Hobart is bisexual. He initially identifies as straight and dates his classmate Alice Charles, but he develops a romantic relationship with his male classmate River Barkley and even has a threesome with River and his girlfriend Astrid Sloan. He and Alice later enter a short-lived polyamorous relationship with Astrid before getting married.
2019–2020	The Politician	Netflix	Astrid Sloan	Lucy Boynton	Astrid describes herself and her boyfriend River Barkley as kinda fluid, and enegages in a threeway with River and his male lover Payton Hobart. After River's death she has a brief sexual relationship with a man named Ricardo and also engages in a short term polyamorous relationship with Payton and his girlfriend Alice Charles.
2019–2020	The Politician	Netflix	Georgina Hobart	Gwyneth Paltrow	In season 1 Georgina leaves her husband Keaton for her female horse trainer, Brigitte. She later has relationships with Alison and Tino McCutcheon.
2019–2020	The Politician	Netflix	Brigitte	Martina Navratilova	In season 1 Georgina leaves her husband Keaton for her female horse trainer, Brigitte. She later has relationships with Alison and Tino McCutcheon.
2019–2020	The Politician	Netflix	McAfee Westbrook	Laura Dreyfuss	Throughout the series McAfee has relationships with men and women.
2019–2020	The Politician	Netflix	Skye Leighton	Rahne Jones	Skye Leighton is a gender non-conforming lesbian.
2019–2020	The Politician	Netflix	James Sullivan	Theo Germaine	James Sullivan is a trans man.
2019–2020	The Politician	Netflix	Marcus Standish	Joe Morton	For over ten years Marcus and his wife Dede were involved in a polyamorous relationship with a man named William Ward, although William dumps them after falling in love with another woman. Marcus and Dede briefly engage in a sexual relationship with a different man before dumping him and divorcing each other.
2019–2020	The Politician	Netflix	William Ward	Teddy Sears	For over ten years Teddy was engaged in a polyamorous relationship with married couple Marcus and Dede Standish, but eventually leaves them for a woman named Hadassah Gold.
2019–2020	The Politician	Netflix	Alice Charles	Julia Schlaepfer	Alice initially only has relationships with men, including a long time relationship with her classmate Payton Hobart, an affair with Payton's best friend James Sullivan, and a brief engagement to a male classmate. She later develops a short term polyamorous relationship with Payton and Astrid Sloan before eventually dumping Astrid and marrying Payton.
2019–2020	The Politician	Netflix	Andi Mueller	Robin Weigert	Andi Mueller is a lesbian.
2019–2020	The Politician	Netflix	Susan	Liv Mai	Susan is a lesbian.
2019	Pretty Little Liars: The Perfectionists	Freeform	Alison DiLaurentis	Sasha Pieterse	Alison is bisexual. She was in a relationship with Emily Fields in the first series.
2019	Pretty Little Liars: The Perfectionists	Freeform	Dylan Walker	Eli Brown	Dylan is gay.
2019	Pretty Little Liars: The Perfectionists	Freeform	Andrew Villareal	Evan Bittencourt	Andrew is gay.
2019	Pretty Little Liars: The Perfectionists	Freeform	Nolan Hotchkiss	Chris Mason	Nolan is bisexual.
2019	Proven Innocent	Fox	Madeline Scott	Rachelle Lefevre	Madeline is bisexual. She was with Wren during her time in prison. Wren is a lesbian.
2019	Proven Innocent	Fox	Wren	Candice Coke	Madeline is bisexual. She was with Wren during her time in prison. Wren is a lesbian.
2019	The Red Line	CBS	Dr. Harrison Brennan	Corey Reynolds	Dr. Harrison Brennan is gay. He is married to Daniel Calder. He is shot while unarmed by a white cop.
2019	The Red Line	CBS	Daniel Calder	Noah Wyle	Daniel Calder is gay. He is a high school history teacher mourning the death of his husband, Dr. Harrison Brennan, a black man who is shot while unarmed by a white cop.
2019	The Red Line	CBS	Liam Bhatt	Vinny Chhibber	Liam is a gay Muslim American teacher.
2019	The Red Line	CBS	Riley Hooper	J.J. Hawkins	Riley is a trans-masculine high school student.
2019–2025	The Righteous Gemstones	HBO	Kelvin Gemstone	Adam DeVine	Kelvin kisses Keefe.
2019–2025	The Righteous Gemstones	HBO	Keefe Chambers	Tony Cavalero	Kelvin kisses Keefe.
2019–2022	Roswell, New Mexico	The CW	Michael Guerin	Michael Vlamis	Michael is a bisexual alien.
2019–2022	Roswell, New Mexico	The CW	Alex Manes	Tyler Blackburn	Alex is gay.
2019–2022	Roswell, New Mexico	The CW	Isobel Evans	Lily Cowles	Isobel Evans-Bracken is pasexual.
2019–2022	Roswell, New Mexico	The CW	Charlie Cameron	Jamie Clayton	Charlie Cameron is a trans woman, and an FBI agent. She uses the alias Agent Grace Powell.
2019–2022	Roswell, New Mexico	The CW	Blair	Sarah Minnich	Blair is a lesbian, and a bartender at the local gay bar.
2019–2023	Sex Education	Netflix	Eric Effiong	Ncuti Gatwa	Eric is openly gay.
2019–2023	Sex Education	Netflix	Anwar	Chaneil Kular	Anwar is gay.
2019–2023	Sex Education	Netflix	Adam Groff	Connor Swindells	Adam Groff is bisexual. He's in a relationship with Aimee at the start of season 1 but later kisses and pursues Eric.
2019–2023	Sex Education	Netflix	Ruthie	Lily Newmark	Ruthie is lesbian.
2019–2023	Sex Education	Netflix	Tanya	Alice Hewkin	Tanya is lesbian.
2019–2023	Sex Education	Netflix	Sofia Marchetti	Hannah Waddingham	Sofia and Roz Marchetti are Jackson's lesbian mothers.
2019–2023	Sex Education	Netflix	Roz Marchetti	Sharon Duncan-Brewster	Sofia and Roz Marchetti are Jackson's lesbian mothers.
2019–2023	Sex Education	Netflix	Rahim	Sami Outalbali	Rahim is gay. He is introduced in season 2 and is in a relationship with Eric.
2019–2023	Sex Education	Netflix	Florence	Mirren Mack	Florence is asexual.
2019–2023	Sex Education	Netflix	Ola Nyman	Patricia Allison	Ola is pansexual.
2019–2023	Sex Education	Netflix	Cal Bowman	Dua Saleh	Cal is a non-binary student.
2019	The Society	Netflix	Sam	Sean Berdy	Sam is gay and deaf. Grizz is gay and learns sign language so he can communicate with Sam. They are romantically and sexually involved with each other.
2019	The Society	Netflix	Grizz	Jack Mulhern	Sam is gay and deaf. Grizz is gay and learns sign language so he can communicate with Sam. They are romantically and sexually involved with each other.
2019–2021	Special	Netflix	Ryan Hayes	Ryan O'Connell	Ryan is openly gay.
2019–2021	Special	Netflix	Carey	Augustus Prew	Carey is a gay journalist. He has a boyfriend, but befriends Ryan.
2019	The Stranded	Netflix	Krit	Perth Tanapon	Krit and Jack are a gay couple.
2019	The Stranded	Netflix	Jack	Mark Siwat	Krit and Jack are a gay couple.
2019	The Stranded	Netflix	Arisa	Chaleeda Gilbert	Arisa is a lesbian.
2019	The Stranded	Netflix	Ying	Ticha Wongtipkanon	Ying is bisexual.
2019–2020	Stumptown	ABC	Dexadrine "Dex" Parios	Cobie Smulders	Dex is bisexual.
2019	Tales of the City	Netflix	Shawna Hawkins	Elliot Page	Shawna is bisexual.
2019	Tales of the City	Netflix	Michael 'Mouse' Tolliver	Murray Bartlett	Michael is gay.
2019	Tales of the City	Netflix	Ben Marshall	Charlie Barnett	Ben is Michael's boyfriend.
2019	Tales of the City	Netflix	Anna Madrigal	Olympia Dukakis	Anna is a transgender woman.
2019	Tales of the City	Netflix	Jake Rodriguez	Garcia	Jake is a transgender male.
2019	Tales of the City	Netflix	Margot Park	May Hong	Margot is lesbian.
2019	Tales of the City	Netflix	Samuel Garland	Victor Garber	Samuel is gay.
2019	Tales of the City	Netflix	DeDe Halcyon Day	Barbara Garrick	DeDe is lesbian.
2019	Tales of the City	Netflix	Claire Duncan	Zosia Mamet	Claire is Shawna's love interest.
2019	Tales of the City	Netflix	Ida Best	Bob the Drag Queen	Ida is gay and a drag queen.
2019	Tales of the City	Netflix	Harrison	Matthew Risch	Harrison is gay.
2019	Tales of the City	Netflix	Flaco Ramirez	Juan Castano	Flaco is gay.
2019	Tales of the City	Netflix	Mateo	Dickie Hearts	Mateo is gay and deaf.
2019	Tales of the City	Netflix	Inka Gisladottior	Samantha Soule	Inka is bisexual.
2019–2020	TharnType	One31	Tharn	Mew Suppasit	Tharn is gay. Tharn and Type are love interests. Thai boys love television series.
2019–2020	TharnType	One31	Type	Gulf Kanawut	Type is gay.
2019–2020	TharnType	One31	Lhong	Kaownah Kittipat	Lhong is gay.
2019–2020	TharnType	One31	Tar	Kokliang Parinya	Tar is Tharn's ex-boyfriend.
2019–2020	TharnType	One31	Tum	Hiter Natthad	Tum is gay.
2019–2020	TharnType	One31	Khlui	Mawin Tanawin	Khlui is gay.
2019	Theory of Love	GMM 25	Third	Gun Atthaphan	Third originally has a secret crush on Khai but they eventually become a gay couple.
2019	Theory of Love	GMM 25	Khai	Off Jumpol	Third originally has a secret crush on Khai but they eventually become a gay couple.
2019–	Toy Boy	Antena 3 Netflix	Jairo	Carlos Constanzia	Jairo is openly gay. Andrea is gay. Jairo and Andrea develop a romantic relationship.
2019–	Toy Boy	Antena 3 Netflix	Andrea Norman Medina	Juanjo Almeida	Jairo is openly gay. Andrea is gay. Jairo and Andrea develop a romantic relationship.
2019–2020	Trinkets	Netflix	Elodie Davis	Brianna Hildebrand	Elodie Davis is lesbian and a kleptomaniac. Sabine is a queer singer who shows interest in Elodie. This is reciprocated, and they kiss.
2019–2020	Trinkets	Netflix	Sabine	Katrina Cunningham	Elodie Davis is lesbian and a kleptomaniac. Sabine is a queer singer who shows interest in Elodie. This is reciprocated, and they kiss.
2019–2024	The Umbrella Academy	Netflix	Klaus Hargreeves	Robert Sheehan	Klaus (aka The Séance, Number Four) is pansexual.
2019–2024	The Umbrella Academy	Netflix	Viktor Hargreeves	Elliot Page	Viktor (aka The White Violin, Number 7) is a bisexual trans man.
2019–2024	The Umbrella Academy	Netflix	Dave	Cody Ray Thompson	Dave is gay. He and Klaus were together during the Vietnam War when Klaus travels back in time.
2019–2024	The Umbrella Academy	Netflix	Sissy Cooper	Marin Ireland	Sissy is bisexual.
2019	The Untamed	Tencent Video	Wei Wuxian	Xiao Zhan	Wei Wuxian and Lan Wangji have a romantic friendship. The original web novel depicted a romantic relationship between the two main male characters, but it was changed for the television adaptation due to media censorship of LGBT portrayals.
2019	The Untamed	Tencent Video	Lan Wangji	Wang Yibo	Wei Wuxian and Lan Wangji have a romantic friendship. The original web novel depicted a romantic relationship between the two main male characters, but it was changed for the television adaptation due to media censorship of LGBT portrayals.
2019–2020	Until We Meet Again	Line TV	Dean	Ohm Thitiwat	Dean and Pharm are a gay couple. Thai boys love television series.
2019–2020	Until We Meet Again	Line TV	Pharm	Fluke Natouch	Dean and Pharm are a gay couple. Thai boys love television series.
2019–2020	Until We Meet Again	Line TV	In	Earth Katsamonnat	In and Korn are a gay couple.
2019–2020	Until We Meet Again	Line TV	Korn	Kao Noppakao	In and Korn are a gay couple.
2019–2020	Until We Meet Again	Line TV	Team	Prem Warut	Team and Win are a couple.
2019–2020	Until We Meet Again	Line TV	Win	Boun Noppanut	Team and Win are a couple.
2019–2020	Until We Meet Again	Line TV	Alex	Mean Phiravich	Alex is bisexual. He initially had a crush on Pharm but later dates Del.
2019	Watchmen	HBO	Will Reeves	Louis Gossett Jr.	Will Reeves is gay or bisexual, and had an affair with Nelson Gardner.
2019	Watchmen	HBO	Nelson Gardner	Jovan Adepo	Will Reeves is gay or bisexual, and had an affair with Nelson Gardner.
2019	Weird City	YouTube Premium	Stu	Dylan O'Brien	Stu and Burt are in a sexual and romantic relationship. They are assigned to be together after an app determines they are meant for one another.
2019	Weird City	YouTube Premium	Burt	Ed O'Neill	Stu and Burt are in a sexual and romantic relationship. They are assigned to be together after an app determines they are meant for one another.
2019	Weird City	YouTube Premium	Liquia	Laverne Cox	Liquia and Jathryn are in a committed romantic and sexual relationship.
2019	Weird City	YouTube Premium	Jathryn	Sara Gilbert	Liquia and Jathryn are in a committed romantic and sexual relationship.
2019–2023	What Did You Eat Yesterday?	TV Tokyo, Toho	Shiro Kakei	Hidetoshi Nishijima	Shiro and Kenji are the main characters and they have been together for three years.
2019–2023	What Did You Eat Yesterday?	TV Tokyo, Toho	Kenji Yabuki	Seiyō Uchino	Shiro and Kenji are the main characters and they have been together for three years.
2019	What/If	Netflix	Marcos	Juan Castano	Marcos and Lionel are a couple.
2019	What/If	Netflix	Lionel	John Clarence Stewart	Marcos and Lionel are a couple.
2019	What/If	Netflix	Kevin	Derek Smith	Kevin was a one time hook-up for the couple, but became a good friend.
2019–2024	What We Do in the Shadows	FX	Laszlo Cravensworth	Matt Berry	Laszlo is married to Nadja. In the pilot, he admits to a secret affair with Baron Afanas. He also has had multiple sexual encounters with men
2019–2024	What We Do in the Shadows	FX	Nandor the Relentless	Kayvan Novak	It is revealed in Season 4 that some of the 37 wives Nandor had in the past were men, he just calls all of them wives, he has also hooked up with Laszlo at least twice.
2019–2024	What We Do in the Shadows	FX	Nadja of Antipaxos	Natasia Demetriou	Nadja is Laszlo's wife. Although she's mostly shown an interest in men, Nadja passionately had sex with a female reincarnation of a resurrected lover.
2019–2024	What We Do in the Shadows	FX	Guillermo de la Cruz	Harvey Guillén	Guillermo comes out as gay in Season 4.
2019–2021	Why Women Kill	CBS All Access; Paramount+	Karl Grove	Jack Davenport	Karl is Simone's husband who is using their relationship to conceal his homosexuality.
2019–2021	Why Women Kill	CBS All Access; Paramount+	Taylor Harding	Kirby Howell-Baptiste	Taylor is a bisexual feminist attorney in an open marriage.
2019–2021	Why Women Kill	CBS All Access; Paramount+	Jade	Alexandra Daddario	Jade is the mistress of Taylor.
2019	The Witcher	Netflix	Jaskier	Joey Batey	Jaskier is sapioromantic, sapiosexual, panromantic and pansexual, and Radovid is gay. They have a crush on each other, kiss, and have sex (off screen, implied by Radovid asking Jaskier to "take him") in Season 3.
2019	The Witcher	Netflix	Radovid	Hugh Skinner	Jaskier is sapioromantic, sapiosexual, panromantic and pansexual, and Radovid is gay. They have a crush on each other, kiss, and have sex (off screen, implied by Radovid asking Jaskier to "take him") in Season 3.
2019–2023	World on Fire	BBC One	Webster O'Connor	Brian J. Smith	Webster O'Connor is a gay American doctor. Albert Fallou is a gay Parisian saxophonist. They are in a romantic relationship.
2019–2023	World on Fire	BBC One	Albert Fallou	Parker Sawyers	Webster O'Connor is a gay American doctor. Albert Fallou is a gay Parisian saxophonist. They are in a romantic relationship.
2019	Years and Years	BBC One	Daniel Lyons	Russell Tovey	Daniel is gay. He was married to Ralph and is in a relationship with Viktor.
2019	Years and Years	BBC One	Ralph Cousins	Dino Fetscher	Ralph is gay. He is Daniel's ex-husband.
2019	Years and Years	BBC One	Viktor Goraya	Maxim Baldry	Viktor is gay. He is in a relationship with Daniel.
2019	Years and Years	BBC One	Edith Lyons	Jessica Hynes	Edith Lyons is a lesbian. Fran Baxter is a lesbian. They are in a relationship.
2019	Years and Years	BBC One	Fran Baxter	Sharon Duncan-Brewster	Edith Lyons is a lesbian. Fran Baxter is a lesbian. They are in a relationship.

== See also ==
- List of lesbian characters in television
- List of gay characters in television
- List of bisexual characters in television
- List of transgender characters in television
- List of BL dramas
- Lists of dramatic television series with LGBT characters
- List of fictional asexual characters
- List of fictional intersex characters
- List of fictional non-binary characters
- List of fictional pansexual characters
- List of animated series with LGBT characters
- List of comedy television series with LGBT characters
- List of horror television series with LGBT characters
- List of made-for-television films with LGBT characters
- List of news and information television programs featuring LGBT subjects
- List of reality television programs with LGBT cast members
- List of LGBT characters in radio and podcasts
- List of LGBT characters in soap operas
