= Don't Quit Your Gay Job =

- Genre: Reality television
- Starring: Rob Easton; Sean Horlor; Tommy Dolanjski (as Tommy D); Adam Rollins; Robyn Daye Edwards
- Country of origin: Canada
- Original language: English
- No. of seasons: 4
- No. of episodes: 23

Production
- Production locations: Vancouver, British Columbia
- Running time: 30 minutes

Original release
- Network: OUTtv
- Release: 2009

Don't Quit Your Gay Job is a Canadian reality television series presented by Rob Easton and Sean Horlor.

Each half-hour episode of Don't Quit Your Gay Job featured Easton and Horlor competing to see who can be the most successful at stereotypically "gay" jobs. The first season of the show was broadcast in 2009 (6 episodes) and a second season in 2010 (7 episodes) started with a sports series (curling, hockey and professional wrestling) followed by a general set of careers.

In season 3, Horlor left the show, with Easton in the job solely as host. Tommy Dolanjski, under his stage name Tommy D, and Adam Rollins, took over the competition aspect of show, working on the gay jobs, with the winner of each episode awarded $500. In season 4, Robyn Daye Edwards took over hosting duties, while the cash award per job was increased to $1,000.

== Episodes ==
=== Season 1 ===
- Bus Driver
- Stripper
- Equestrian
- Dominatrix
- Fashion Model
- Drag Queen

=== Season 2 ===
- Curling
- Hockey
- Police
- Wrestling
- Salon & Spa
- Culinary Arts
- Gardeners

=== Season 3 ===
- Lifeguard
- Interior Designer
- Flight Attendant
- Latin Ballroom Dancer
- Firefighter

=== Season 4 ===
- Lumberjack
- Brewery
- Florist
- Garbage Man
- Food Truck

== Awards and nominations ==
The series received three nominations at the 2011 Leo Awards:

- Best information or lifestyle series
- Best director for Nicky Forsman
- Best hosts for Rob & Sean

It was also voted as the #1 favorite new gay series by here! gay television network in the United States
