= Rob Easton =

Canadian media personality

Rob Easton is a Canadian media personality best known for co-hosting the gay television series Don't Quit Your Gay Job (DQYGJ), that was launched in 2009 on OUTtv. In the series, he competes with his friend and co-host Sean Horlor to master stereotypical gay and non-gay jobs. Each episode features Easton and Horlor competing to see who can be the most successful at a given job. The first season of the show (2009) had six episodes about jobs as bus driver, stripper, equestrian, dominatrix, modelling and drag. The second season featured curling, hockey, policing and extreme wrestling.

Prior to DQYGJ, Easton took part in CBC Radio's The Early Edition, in Radio-Canada's Téléjournal Colombie-Britannique, and wrote for Xtra Vancouver and The Georgia Straight, and in 2011 was a story editor for HGTV's Urban Suburban. He worked as cinematographer for How Far Will You Go? a documentary about gay modeling. He also worked with Mado Lamotte in the Montreal drag club Cabaret Mado and is part of the Chor Leoni Men's Choir.

== Personal life ==
Easton grew up on Vancouver Island in Campbell River, which he tries to visit as often as he can. He graduated with a Bachelor of Arts in sociology from the University of Victoria and a Diploma of Technology in broadcast journalism from British Columbia Institute of Technology (BCIT).
