= Socarides =

Socarides is a surname. Notable people with the surname include:

- Charles Socarides (January 24, 1922 - December 25, 2005), American psychiatrist, psychoanalyst, physician, educator, and author
- Richard Socarides (born 1954), American political strategist and commentator and attorney, son of Charles
