= Lesbian Mothers Union =

American lesbian rights organization

- Successor: Lesbian Mothers and Friends
- Formation: June 1971; 54 years ago
- Founder: Del Martin; Pat Norman
- Founded at: San Francisco, California; Oakland, California
- Legal status: inactive
- Purpose: Advocating for the rights of lesbian mothers, offering assistance to lesbian mothers
- Origins: Gay Women's West Coast Conference (1971)
- Key people: Phyllis Lyon; Ruth Mahaney; Judie Ghidinelli; Cathy Cade
- Affiliations: Lesbian Mother's National Defense Fund

The Lesbian Mothers Union (LMU), later known as Lesbian Mothers and Friends, was created by Del Martin and Pat Norman, along with other activists, in an effort to combat the legal persecution and separation from society that lesbian mothers face. Lesbian mothers were in desperate need of support, and the Lesbian Mothers Union offered assistance to those residing in the San Francisco Bay area.

== Origins ==
The Lesbian Mothers Union can trace its origins to the Gay Women's West Coast Conference in June 1971, in Los Angeles. The conference planners neglected to provide child care options to attendees, and had previously ignored a request for events specifically for Lesbian mothers. The initial membership included thirty-six women, out of the conference attendance of two hundred, with Del Martin as a contact for the organization. Eventually the Lesbian Mothers Union was established in both San Francisco and Oakland, California, totaling more than a hundred members locally by 1973.

The group described their unique burden as both mothers and lesbians, facing rejection from within even their own community. They described difficulties securing housing, navigating relationships between romantic partners and their children, and preparing their children to deal with "the cruelties of straight world oppression." Specifically the organization sought to provide financial and legal aid to Lesbian mothers as, at the time of the group's formation, no "admitted Lesbians" had won a child custody case in California. The organization would find witnesses and research to demonstrate that Lesbian mothers provided good homes for their children. Because custody battles were inextricably linked to morality, and Lesbianism was perceived to be deviant, the organization also worked to change the perception of Lesbians.

== Founders and prominent members ==
Del Martin, a lesbian rights activist, died in 2008 after five decades of her efforts to promote gay rights. Martin was married to Phyllis Lyon, and the two were partners for 55 years. Working together, Martin and Lyon spent their lives working for these rights for themselves, as well as other lesbians and gays. Del Martin became known as one of the founders for the Lesbian Mothers Union, and her contact information was tied to the organization within its first year. She also founded various other similar organizations, such as the National Organization for Women, Council on Religion and the Homosexual, and the Alice B. Toklas Democratic Club, America's first openly gay political organization. Together, the two women co-founded the organization the Daughters of Bilitis in 1956. It was in this same area, the San Francisco Bay, that the Lesbian Mothers Union was created, just a mere 15 years later.

Pat Norman was born on October 21, 1939, in Brooklyn, New York. Throughout her life, she has advocated for women's rights, as well as spending much of her life dedicated to the rights of the LGBTQ+ community. In 1971, she founded the Lesbian Mothers Union, along with other activists. Between the years of 1972 and 1979, she focused her time on policies about mental health services for sexual minority groups. She also spent her time training employees on how to best help the LGBTQ+ communities, using sensitivity and awareness of the proper resources. Pat spent a great deal of the 1970s working for the San Francisco Health Department, in which she was the only openly gay employee. Her time spent there was focused on the AIDS epidemic.

Other active members of the LMU included Phyllis Lyon, Ruth Mahaney, Judie Ghidinelli, and Cathy Cade.

In 2017, ABC released a docuseries titled When We Rise about LGBTQ+ activists, including Pat Norman, who was played by Whoopi Goldberg.

== Support ==
After the creation of the Lesbian Mothers Union in San Francisco, other women from different cities were inspired by the idea and created similar groups to support the lesbian mothers of their areas. The Lesbian Mothers Union also circulated their newsletter in Boston, Chicago, and New York. Groups like the LMU “raised funds for legal fees, put lesbians fighting for custody in touch with sympathetic expert witnesses, and in rare cases, helped lesbian mothers and their children go underground when it was clear that they were going to be separated.” Members Del Martin and Pat Norman conducted outreach like speaking at UC Davis School of Law on issues facing lesbian mothers. The groups also aimed to hold discussions to address concerns of the lesbian mothers in their area, as well as deeper topics, such as the societal push for heterosexuality. They helped to link other lesbian mothers together by organizing events that all members could participate in.

By 1973 the LMU had created a legal defense fund to support members financially as they fought custody battles. Scott's Pit, a popular gay bar in San Francisco, was the site of two benefit auctions/raffles in 1973 and 1974, that included guest auctioneers like José Sarria and J.J. Van Dyke. At this time, the Lesbian Mothers' National Defense Fund also began fundraising in Seattle to support custody battles involving Lesbians. Other events included a 1972 Christmas party, planned by gay motorcycle clubs of San Francisco; Toys for Tots drives in 1973 and 1975, sporadic potluck dinners for members, and a 1977 "day in the park" for mothers and children. All these events served to encourage community.

At the fundamental level, the Lesbian Mothers Union made lesbian mothers visible, which is a political act in itself. The organization grew from meeting every so often to regular meetings which were held along with fund-raising events. Through their fundraisers and events they received many supporters and friends which was vital to their organization. One of their main fundraisers was called the Lesbian Mothers Day Auction. People would gather in a popular lesbian bar where objects would be auctioned off. All funds would go directly to lesbian mothers and their custody battles.

It is estimated that there were 130 members in San Francisco. In May 1975, The Lesbian Mothers Union was changed to Lesbian Mothers and Friends. This gave space for people who were allies to join political and social conversations surrounding lesbian mothers.

== Legacy ==
After the 1970s, there is little evidence that the group remained active. However, they were an inspiration for many other similar groups that spread throughout other cities in the United States. Many of these other groups are still active and are working towards supporting and fighting for the rights of the LGBTQ+ community.
