= Austin P. McKenzie =

American actor (born 1993)

- Born: August 24, 1993 (age 33); Mesa, Arizona, U.S.
- Education: Columbia College Chicago
- Occupations: Actor; singer; ASL interpreter
- Years active: 2014–present
- Known for: Spring Awakening on Broadway
- Partner: Kevin McHale (2016–present)

Austin P. McKenzie (born August 24, 1993) is an American actor and singer, known for his role as Melchior Gabor in Deaf West Theatre's 2015 Broadway revival of Spring Awakening. His performance as Melchior garnered significant critical acclaim, and multiple theatrical award nominations, for both Los Angeles runs and its run on Broadway.

== Early life ==
McKenzie grew up in Mesa, Arizona. When he was young, he wanted to become a music minister, even though his family did not regularly attend church.

Starting at age fifteen, McKenzie spent six summers assisting at a summer camp for children and adults with mental and physical disabilities called Lions Camp Tatiyee. The camp was his first contact with people who are deaf or hard of hearing, and inspired him to enroll at Columbia College Chicago, where he studied American Sign Language and Childhood Education with the intention of becoming a special educator. He graduated in 2014 with a Bachelor's degree in American Sign Language and Vocal Performance.

During high school, McKenzie had a casual involvement in the arts and was involved with some theatre, but did not see it as a possible career.

== Career ==
=== Spring Awakening (2014–2016) ===
Soon after graduating from Columbia College Chicago, McKenzie sent a tape to director Michael Arden and the creative team at Deaf West Theatre, with hopes of obtaining a job as an interpreter during the company's ASL-inclusive run of Spring Awakening. However, the Deaf West team saw his potential, and requested he audition for the leading role in the production—the radical atheist Melchior Gabor. He was given the role, and began rehearsing for the show in mid-2014. At first, McKenzie was the only member of the hearing cast that was able to effectively communicate with their deaf and hard-of-hearing cohorts, thanks to his training in ASL. Deaf West's Spring Awakening originally performed at a 99-seat theatre off of Skid Row in Los Angeles, California, from September 14, 2014, to November 9, 2014. It was McKenzie's professional theatre debut.

In 2015, the production was rebooted at the Wallis Annenberg Center for the Performing Arts in Beverly Hills with the additions of cast members Andy Mientus as Hanschen Rilow, Krysta Rodriguez as Ilse Neumann, Alex Boniello as the voice of Moritz Stiefel, and Alex Wyse as Georg Zirschnitz. McKenzie reprised his role as Melchior. McKenzie and the rest of the cast were highly acclaimed by critics, receiving many nominations and wins for Ovation Awards, including his Best Leading Actor in a Musical nomination. The show ran from May 21, 2015 to June 14, 2015.

In the mid-summer of 2015, it was announced that the production would transfer to Broadway with its current cast for a limited engagement at the Brooks Atkinson Theatre. McKenzie made his Broadway debut on September 8, 2015, and stayed with the production through its closing on January 24, 2016. The show ran two weeks past its intended run due to its positive reviews, and garnered three Tony Award nominations including Best Revival of a Musical.

=== Film and television (2015–present) ===
In addition to theatre, McKenzie has appeared on both the big and small screen. In 2015, he appeared in a one-episode, guest-starring role in the television series The 101.

He starred in the feature film Speech & Debate, adapted from the hit 2007 off-Broadway play of the same name by Tony-winning playwright Stephen Karam and released by Sycamore Pictures and Vertical Entertainment on April 7, 2017. McKenzie stars as one of three leads as the character of Howie, an openly gay teenager alongside Sarah Steele, who also starred in the original off-Broadway premiere of Speech & Debate and Liam James. The film features three misfit students in high school who are frustrated with the hypocrisy they see in their parents and school staff. Together, they try to revive an extinct school debate club to face the situation in which they find themselves. A number of theater names including Darren Criss and Lin-Manuel Miranda cameo in the film and Kristin Chenoweth sings an original song.

In 2017, McKenzie starred in the ABC miniseries When We Rise, created by Dustin Lance Black and Gus Van Sant. He portrays the young LGBT activist Cleve Jones in the period piece, which chronicles the struggles of LGBTQ people who helped pioneer an offshoot of the civil rights movement in the 20th century.

== Personal life ==
McKenzie is bisexual. He has been in a relationship with actor Kevin McHale, whom he met while filming When We Rise, since 2016.

== Theatre credits ==
Year	Production	Role	Type	Location	Dates
2014	Spring Awakening	Melchior Gabor	Los Angeles	Rosenthal Theatre	September 14, 2014 – November 9, 2014
2015	Spring Awakening	Melchior Gabor	Los Angeles	Wallis Annenberg Center	May 21, 2015 – June 14, 2015
2015–16	Spring Awakening	Melchior Gabor	Broadway	Brooks Atkinson Theatre	September 8, 2015 – January 24, 2016

== Filmography ==
Year	Title	Role	Type	Notes
2015	The 101	Terry	TV series	episode: "Roommates 101" (as Austin McKenzie)
2016	Goodbye Charley	Charley	short film	
2017	When We Rise	Cleve Jones	TV miniseries	7 episodes (as Austin McKenzie)
2017	Speech & Debate	Howie	Film	as Austin McKenzie
2018	Conrad & Michelle: If Words Could Kill	Conrad Roy	TV film	
2019	In The Time It Takes to Get There	Naked Young Man	short film	
2020	Unhinged	Fred	film	

== Soundtracks ==
Year	Title	Role	Type	Song
2017	When We Rise: The Soundtrack	as himself (Austin McKenzie)	Soundtrack for a TV miniseries	"Thinking of You"

== Discography ==
Year	Album title	Note(s)	Track name
2019	Melancholy	debut album	Melancholy, Antisocial, I Belong to You, Mrs. Kennedy, Numb, Hymn, A Genuine Life
2020	Nightshade		Cigarette, Crazy Beautiful, Sex Drive, Vegas Baby, Love Note, Mr., Interlude, Winter, Pearl, Dark. Black. Heart.
2022	Somewhere in Space		Summer of Love, I'm Not Ready to Go, Sending My Love Through the Ether

== Awards and nominations ==
Year	Award	Category	Work	Result
2015	Ovation Awards	Leading Actor in a Musical	Spring Awakening	Nominated
2015	Clive Barnes Awards	The Clive Barnes Award	Spring Awakening	Nominated
2015	BroadwayWorld LA Awards	Best Leading Actor in a Musical	Spring Awakening	Nominated
2016	Theatre World Awards	Outstanding Broadway Debut Performance	Spring Awakening	Won
2016	Fred and Adele Astaire Awards	Outstanding Ensemble in a Broadway Show	Spring Awakening	Nominated
2016	Broadway.com Audience Choice Awards	Favorite Breakthrough Performance (Male)	Spring Awakening	Nominated
