= Speech & Debate =

2016 American film

- Directed by: Dan Harris
- Written by: Stephen Karam
- Based on: Speech & Debate by Stephen Karam
- Starring: Liam James; Sarah Steele; Austin P. McKenzie
- Cinematography: David Hennings
- Edited by: Robert Hoffman
- Music by: Deborah Lurie
- Production company: Sycamore Pictures
- Distributed by: Vertical Entertainment
- Release date: April 7, 2017
- Running time: 105 minutes
- Country: United States
- Language: English

Speech & Debate is a 2017 American film directed by Dan Harris. The film is an adaptation of the play of the same name and was released on April 7, 2017, by Vertical Entertainment.

== Plot ==
The film features three misfit students in a high school in Salem, Oregon: Solomon, Diwata, and Howie, who are frustrated with the hypocrisy they see in their parents and school staff. Together, they try to revive a school debate club to face the situation they are in.

The first thing they have in common is they each have a parent on the school board. Solomon's frustration lies in the limitations he and the rest of the school newspaper have; they must do the stories assigned to them, which concerns him because he plans to study journalism in college but needs authentic proof of his ability.

Diwata is an aspiring actress, and she practices music production with lyrics on her social media page. She also tries out for the upcoming school musical, Once Upon a Mattress. The play's content is heavily altered and essentially censored. In her audition, she purposely uses some of the parts edited out, resulting in her being cast in an inferior role.

Howie is gay, new to the school, lonely, and tries to form a GSA (gay student alliance) club, but is blocked by the predominantly male conservative school board. He also has a casual meet-up with the drama teacher, which becomes awkward when they bump into each other at school.

Solomon proposes an article idea to the school newspaper's advisor entitled "Ignorance and Prejudice Drive School Board Decisions", which is rejected by his yearbook advisor, who gives him a link to the website Find Your Voice, arguing in favor of a debate team. Sharing this with Diwata, she becomes motivated. They try to recruit others to join, but no students who show up to their after school pitch sign up. As they only need three to form a team, Diwata convinces Howie this is a way to meet other gay men.

Diwata takes charge, getting a cafeteria worker to sign on as advisor, and paying with her mother's credit card. At the debate, each fail in their own way, largely due to unfamiliarity with the rules and structure of debating, as there was no actual advisor to guide them. Dejected, they go out to a gay bar. Diwata's car is towed, and they miss the last bus home. They use the credit card for a room, where their parents find them a few hours later.

They are all given detention with no reimbursement for expenses, and Diwata must get a job to pay back her mother. Inspired by a local 'character' who says life is a stage, she reunites the three misfits to confront the school board. They use their time to speak out against censorship, with a theatrical enactment equating their hometown to the 17th century Salem, Massachusetts during the infamous Salem Witch Trials (Diwata acted in The Crucible).

Although the press is turned away from the meeting, they eventually pick up the story and expose the suppression, thanks to someone recording the event on their phone. Solomon appears on a local TV news station broadcast. In the end, all three students are content: both Solomon and Diwata get the needed exposure for their futures, and Howie receives more contacts.

== Cast ==
- Liam James as Solomon
- Sarah Steele as Diwata
- Austin P. McKenzie as Howie
- Roger Bart as Principal Bellingham
- Janeane Garofalo as Marie
- Wendi McLendon-Covey as Joan
- Kal Penn as James
- Kimberly Williams-Paisley as Susan
- Skylar Astin as Walter Healy
- Lin-Manuel Miranda as The Genie
- Ryan Lee as Mark
- Darren Criss as himself
- Lucy DeVito as Lucy
- Sarah Baker as Ms. Riggi
- Lester Speight as Scary Bouncer
- Jeremy Rowley as Gary Crenshaw
- Bryce Romero as short debater

== Production ==
Principal photography started on August 8, 2015 in Jackson, Mississippi, United States.

Karam said that "he specifically aimed to create characters who 'push through their pain'".

The song "Losers Are Winners", which was written by Karam, is played over the credits performed by Kristin Chenoweth.

== Release and reception ==
The film was released on April 7, 2017, by Vertical Entertainment.

On the review aggregator website Rotten Tomatoes, 55% of 11 critics' reviews are positive. Metacritic, which uses a weighted average, assigned the film a score of 46 out of 100, based on 5 critics, indicating "mixed or average" reviews.
