= Cecilia Chung =

Civil rights leader

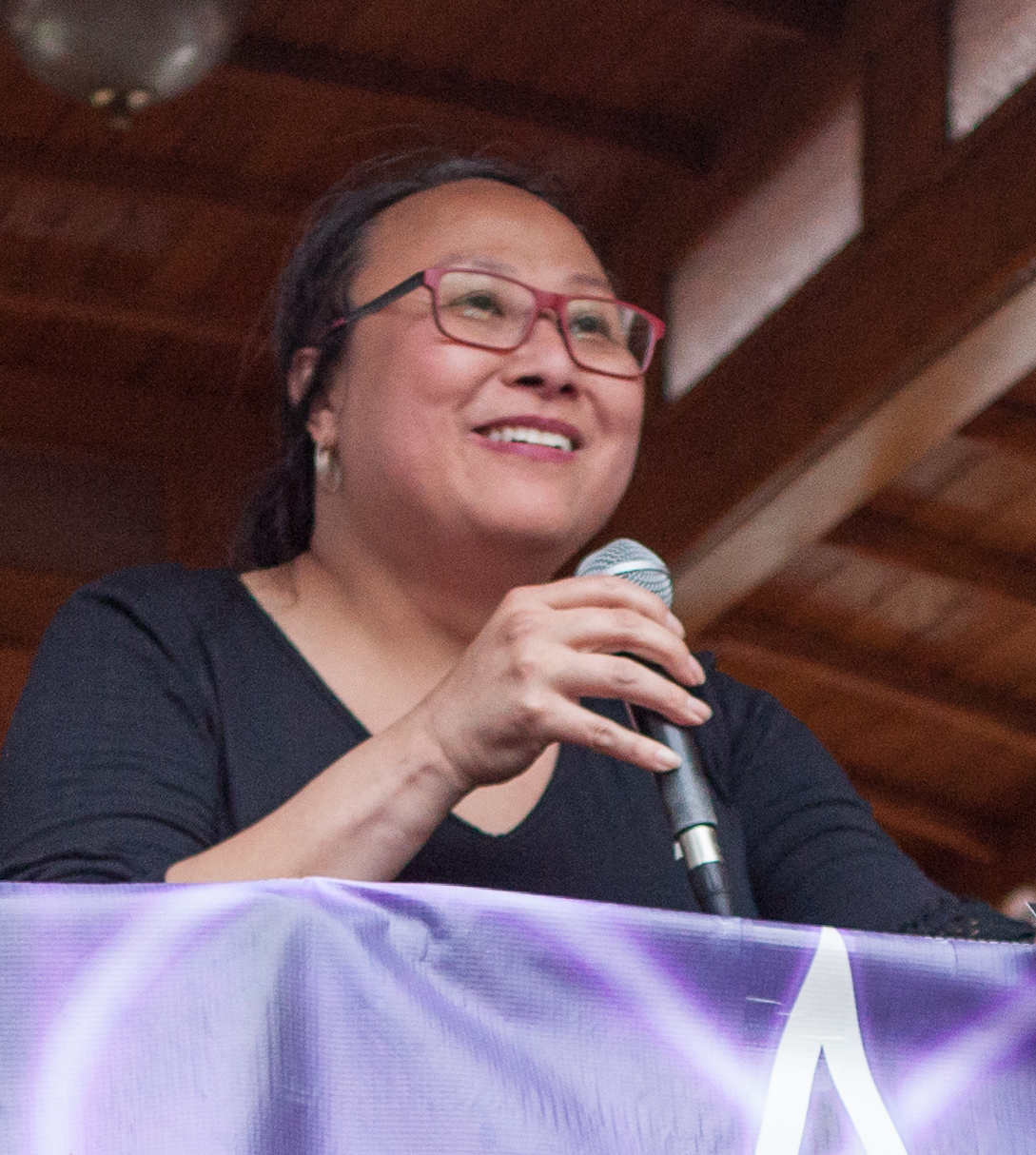
- At Trans March San Francisco, June 2017
- Born: 1965 (age 60–61); British Hong Kong
- Known for: Civil rights leader and activist for LGBT rights, HIV/AIDS awareness, health advocacy and social justice

Cecilia Chung (Chinese: 鍾紹琪) is a civil rights leader and activist for LGBT rights, HIV/AIDS awareness, health advocacy, and social justice. She is a trans woman, and her life story was one of four main storylines in the 2017 ABC miniseries When We Rise about LGBT rights in the 1970s and 1980s.

== Early life ==
Cecilia was born in Hong Kong in 1965 and later immigrated to Los Angeles with her family in 1984. A year later, she moved to San Francisco to attend City College of San Francisco before transferring to Golden Gate University in 1987 with a degree in international management. Afterwards, she spent a few years working as a court interpreter for Santa Clara County and a sales trainer at a financial company.

== Activism ==
Cecilia has spent much of her adult life advocating for health-related issues affecting the LGBT community, including working as an HIV test counselor at UCSF AIDS Health Project, HIV Program Coordinator at API American Health Forum, and deputy director at the Transgender Law Center. Additionally, Cecilia is the first transgender woman and first Asian to be elected to lead the board of directors of the San Francisco Lesbian, Gay, Bisexual, and Transgender Pride Celebration and the first transgender woman and the first person living openly with HIV to chair the San Francisco Human Rights Commission.

Cecilia founded San Francisco Transgender Advocacy and Mentorship (SF TEAM) to provide events for the transgender community through the San Francisco LGBT Community Center. She is also one of the founders of the annual Trans March.

In 2013, Cecilia was appointed to the Health Commission by Mayor Edward Lee. She made headlines for making San Francisco the first city in the United States to pay for gender reassignment surgery for uninsured transgender patients. Through her appointment, she was also able to train San Francisco Department of Public Health staff members about transgender issues in programming called "Transgender 101".

The same year, Cecilia was appointed by President Barack Obama to the Presidential Advisory Council on HIV/AIDS, where she served two full terms and resigned from the council before the inauguration of President Donald Trump.

For the 2014 AIDS Conference, Cecilia published an article titled "HIV: a call for solidarity with the transgender community," in which she shared a personal encounter with police abuse and emphasized the importance of inclusivity and unity within the trans women community.

Cecilia is the Director of Evaluation and Strategic Initiatives at the Transgender Law Center, and the former chair of the US PL HIV Caucus.

== Personal life ==
In 1992, Cecilia decided to transition. She became estranged from her family due to their lack of understanding about her being transgender. She also had to resign from her sales trainer job to facilitate the process. She relied on her court interpreter job as her sole source of income, but her employment contract was soon terminated after a judge noticed her physical changes due to transition. She eventually ended up living on the streets and had to resort to sex work for livelihood, which subjected her to sexual and physical violence. She also turned to drugs for self-medication. In the same year, she was diagnosed as HIV positive.

In 1995, almost 3 years after becoming homeless, Cecilia was stabbed during a sexual assault attempt and taken to the emergency room. Her mother, who was the emergency contact, came to the hospital for a visit and the two reconciled. Since then, Cecilia completed her gender reassignment surgery in Bangkok in 1998.

== Honors and awards ==
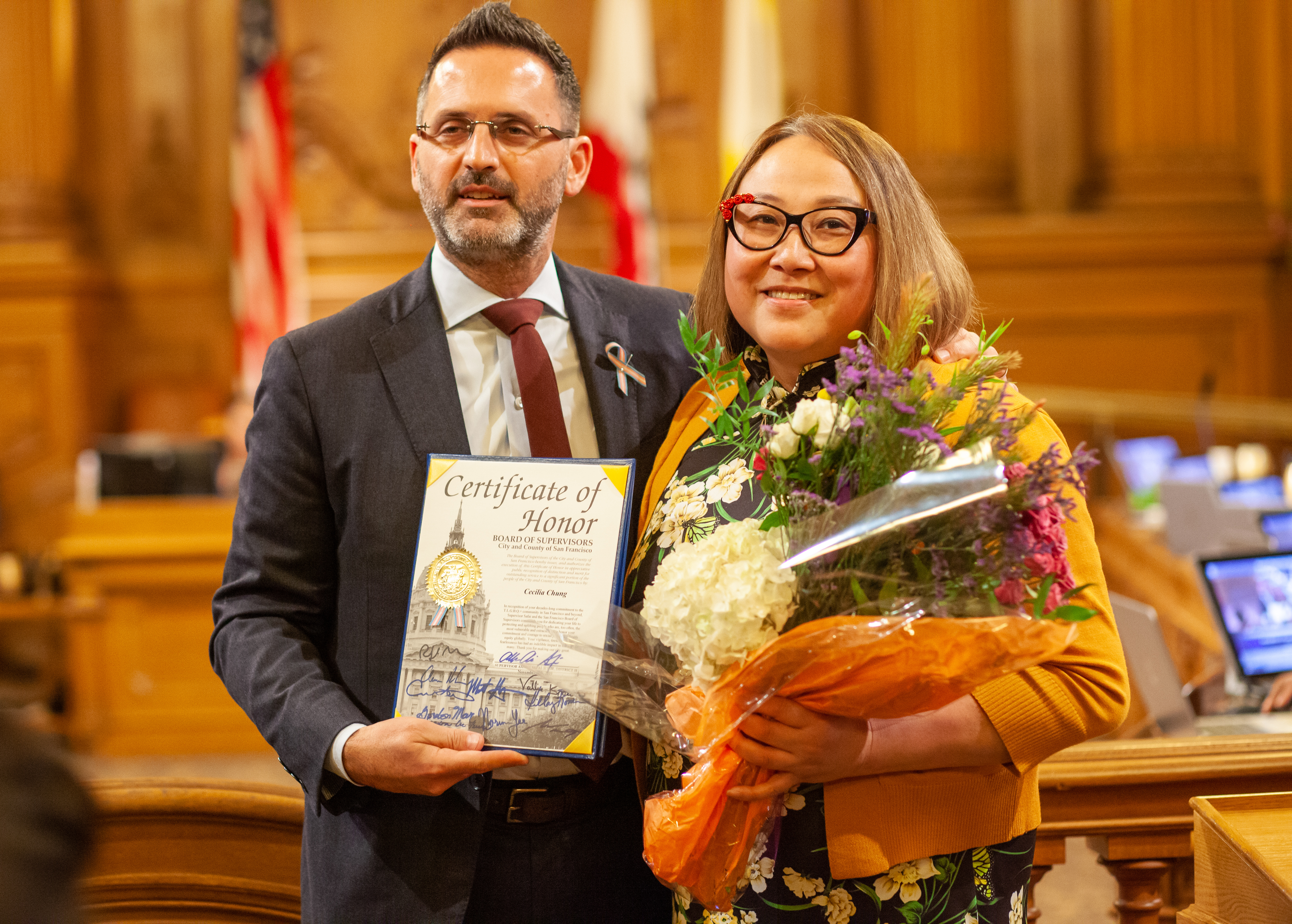
Chung receiving a certificate of honor from San Francisco supervisor Ahsha Safaí, November 2019

- Transgender Discrimination Task Force in 1994
- 1998: San Francisco Lesbian Gay Bisexual Transgender Pride Celebration Committee
- 2001: First Asian and first transgender woman elected to SF LGBT Pride Celebration Committee Board President
- 2001: Asian & Pacific Islander Wellness Center Board of Directors
- 2011: Civil Rights Enforcement Working Group
- 2012: Received the Levi Strauss & Co. Pioneer Award.
- 2013: Appointed to the Health Commission by Mayor Lee
- 2019: Commended by the San Francisco Board of Supervisors during Transgender Awareness Week
- San Francisco AIDS Foundation Cleve Jones Award
- Human Rights Campaign Community Service Award
- California Woman of The Year
- Out and Equal Champion of the Year Award
- 2020: NAAAP100 Award

== In popular culture ==
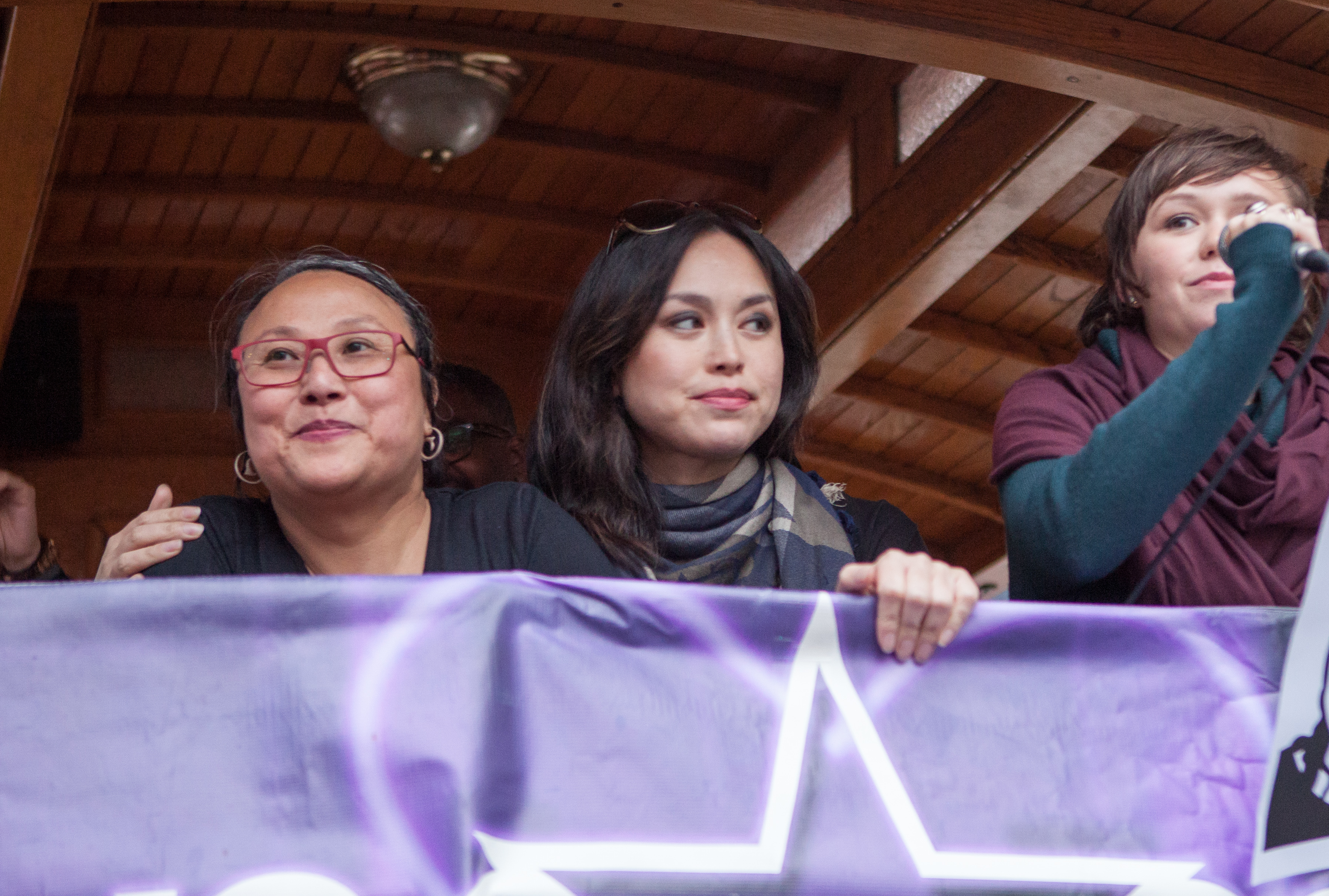
Chung with actresses Ivory Aquino and Emily Skeggs at Trans March San Francisco, June 2017

Ivory Aquino plays Cecilia in the miniseries about LGBT rights called When We Rise.
