= Patrick Norman =

Patrick or Pat Norman may refer to:

- Pat Norman (activist) (born 1939), American activist and community leader
- Patrick Norman (singer) (born 1946), Canadian country music singer from Quebec
- Patrick Norman (musician), guitarist and backing vocalist of Rusted Root
