= Women Drummers International =

Non-profit organization

Women Drummers International (WDI) is a non-profit organization based in San Leandro, California. The mission of the organization is to help empower women through drum playing and to also create a positive environment for learning and teaching drumming. WDI provides women with a support network and drumming retreats. WDI also sponsors a drumming camp called Born To Drum in California. The first camp started in 2006. The drum camps take place annually over a weekend in the early summer at Chabot Regional Park.

WDI was founded in 1998 by percussionist, Carolyn Brandy. The organization became a non-profit group in 2009. Sistah Boom, the San Francisco area marching band, is affiliated with WDI.

== Sistah Boom ==
Sistah Boom is an all-women marching band founded by Brandy in 1982. The band was made up of 40 percussionists, and at one point grew to over 100 members. Sistah Boom dissolved for a time and was brought back in 2008, when Cleve Jones asked Brandy to bring the marching band to the filming of Milk. The band participates in the San Francisco Dyke March, at celebrations, memorials, and in demonstrations.
