= Ken Jones (activist) =

American LGBTQ rights activist (1950–2021)

- Born: Kenneth Wayne Jones; November 9, 1950; Paterson, New Jersey, U.S.
- Died: January 13, 2021 (aged 70); San Francisco, California, U.S.
- Occupations: Activist; deacon

Kenneth Wayne Jones (November 9, 1950 – January 13, 2021) was an American LGBTQ rights activist.

== Life and career ==
Jones was born in Paterson, New Jersey, to parents Viola and Hannibal Jones. He had a sister. After moving to San Francisco in 1969, Jones joined the Navy and served in three tours during the Vietnam War. In 1972, he was assigned to Treasure Island in San Francisco before being honourably discharged. He had said, "In those days you'd get a dishonorable discharge if they discovered you were gay. I was a Vietnam vet with medals. A dishonorable discharge was not in my cards."

After his service, Jones moved to the Castro District, San Francisco in 1973, where he began working for the San Francisco Pride committee, eventually becoming its leader. He was a volunteer at the Kaposi's Sarcoma Research and Education Foundation, which later became the San Francisco AIDS Foundation. He left the SF Pride organization in 1991, following the beating of Rodney King, to focus on police reform issues.

After being diagnosed with HIV, Jones moved to Ocean Beach, San Francisco, where he "spent a decade preparing to die with dignity" only to realize that "[he] might not be dying after all". He withdrew from public activism for a number of years, before his health improved in the 2000s. In 2009, he became a member of the citizen review board for the Bay Area Rapid Transit Police Department.

In 2017, he served as a consultant on the miniseries When We Rise. He was portrayed in the show by actors Jonathan Majors and Michael Kenneth Williams.

Jones was also an ordained deacon.

== Death ==
In September 2020, Jones was diagnosed with bladder cancer, a diagnosis delayed due to a COVID-19 cancer screening hiatus. On January 13, 2021, he died from the disease at the San Francisco VA Medical Center, aged 70.
