= Pat Norman (activist) =

American activist for women's rights (1939–2022)

- Born: Patricia Richardson; October 21, 1939; Brooklyn, New York, U.S.
- Died: August 5, 2022 (aged 82); Las Vegas, Nevada, U.S.
- Other names: Patricia Elise Richardson; Patricia Elise Norman
- Education: Antioch University, B.A., M.A., Clinical Psychology
- Known for: Community activist
- Partner(s): Paul Leon Norman, Sr. (1959-1974) Karen Norman (1983-1997)
- Children: Paul Leon Norman Jr (deceased Dec 19, 1987); Elise "Lori" Norman; Angela Norman James Norman Zachary Norman Kimberly Langsley Norman
- Parents: James Albert Richardson (father); Maude Bessie Richardson (maiden name Martin) (mother)

Pat Norman (born Pat Richardson, October 21, 1939 – August 5, 2022) was an American activist for women's rights, as well as the rights of the African American and LGBT communities.

== Career ==
In 1971, Norman cofounded the Lesbian Mothers Union (later known as Lesbian Mothers and Friends) with Del Martin and others; it was concerned with custody problems and provided support for lesbian mothers, who were routinely stripped of their parental rights for being openly gay.

As a counselor with the Center for Special Problems from 1972 to 1979, she wrote and implemented policy regarding mental health services for sexual minority communities. She also developed training programs for health workers who served these communities, training over 300+ staff members to become competent, sensitive, and aware of the needs of the LGBTQ+ communities.

Norman was the first openly gay employee of the San Francisco Health Department. While employed with the San Francisco Health Department from 1978 to 1987, she created the position of Coordinator of Lesbian/Gay Health Services in which she served the gay and lesbian community in San Francisco and helped initiate community response to the AIDS epidemic, which became a main focus for the department in 1982.

Norman was also the first openly lesbian African-American on the San Francisco Police Commission.

Pat Norman was portrayed by Whoopi Goldberg in the docuseries When We Rise, which was released in early 2017.

== Activism ==
- 1971: She was a founder of the Lesbian Mothers Union (later known as Lesbian Mothers and Friends); it was concerned with custody problems and provided support for lesbian mothers, as children were sometimes taken from openly gay parents.
- 1972-1979: She was a Community Mental Health Worker at the Center for Special Problems, San Francisco, CA.
- 1979-1987: Coordinator for Lesbian/Gay Health Services at San Francisco Health Department; shortly after her appointment, the AIDS epidemic began.)
- In the 1980s, Norman was a leading activist against apartheid.
- Further, in 1980, Pat Norman was a speaker at the First Black Lesbian Conference which took place at the Women's Building in San Francisco. In her speech, Norman shared her personal experiences and spoke on internalized racism and how it was a major obstruction and cause of divide and oppression. Further, she connected internalized racism and the difficulties it presented to the emergence of African American lesbians during the time.
- In 1984 she became the first open lesbian to run for San Francisco city supervisor and co-chaired California's Mobilization for Peace, Jobs, and Justice rally.
- In 1987 she co-chaired and organized the National March on Washington for Lesbian/Gay Rights.
- At the 1988 Democratic National Convention she was a delegate for Jesse Jackson, and that year she again co-chaired California's Mobilization for Peace, Jobs, and Justice rally.
- In 1990, she co-chaired the United States' Nelson Mandela Reception committee, and in 1991 she was elected to the California State Democratic Party Central Committee.
- In 1991, while the executive director of the California AIDS Intervention Training Center, which was to be later renamed the Institute for Community Health Outreach (ICHO), Pat Norman participated in the International Gay and Lesbian Human Rights Commission (IGLHRC).
- In 1992, Norman and her partner Karen appeared on billboards across San Francisco as part of an anti-defamation campaign advertisement that was sponsored by the Gay and Lesbian Alliance Against Defamation.
- In 1994, Norman served as the National Co-chair for "Stonewall 25," a Lesbian and Gay Rights March on the United Nations which took place in New York City.

== Death ==
Pat Norman died at an assisted living facility in Las Vegas, on August 4, 2022, at the age of 82. She had suffered from dementia for some time prior to her death.

== Awards ==
The San Francisco Chapter of the National Organization for Women, 1987;

Harvey Milk Lesbian and Gay Democratic Club, Community Achievement Award, May 1990;

14th International AIDS Candlelight Memorial and Mobilization Award, Mobilization Against AIDS, May 1997;

Certificate of Appreciation, The Greater Geary Boulevard Merchants Association (for her dedication and contributions made to the Merchants of Geary Boulevard, as President of Police Commission), 1998;

Certificate of Honor, Board of Supervisors, 1998;

Certificate of Appreciation, Police Commissioner, 1999 - (as the President of the Office of Citizen Complaints from 1996 to 1998);

California State Assembly, Certificate of Recognition, 2001;

Native American AIDS Project, Certificate of Appreciation, 2003;

In 2007, Pat Norman was honored with the San Francisco Pride's Lifetime Achievement Award and was the Grand Marshall for the San Francisco Pride Parade that year. Norman has also received numerous awards from places such as Ms., The Bay Area Women's Leadership Forum, San Francisco Mayors Dianne Feinstein and Art Agnos, the National Coalition of Black Lesbians and Gays, and Physicians for Human Rights.

Whoopi Goldberg played her in the 2017 miniseries about LGBT rights called When We Rise.

== Organizations ==
Throughout her career, Pat Norman was a member of several organizations including:

- California State Democratic Party Central Committee,
- AIDS Coalition to Unleash Power (ACT UP),
- Women's AIDS Network,
- National Gay Task Force,
- Lesbian Rights Project,
- Human Rights Foundation,
- Community United Against Violence,
- Larkin Street Youth Center,
- State Community Planning Working Group, and
- San Francisco Black Coalition on AIDS.

== See also ==
- Activism
- LGBT activism
- LGBT culture in San Francisco
- Lesbian American history
- Human Rights Activists
