= Lesbian/Woman =

1972 book by Del Martin and Phyllis Lyon

- Cover of the first edition
- Authors: Del Martin and Phyllis Lyon
- Language: English
- Subject: Lesbian feminism
- Publisher: Glide Publications
- Publication date: 1972
- Publication place: United States
- Media type: Print (Hardcover and Paperback)
- Pages: 283
- ISBN: 978-0553235975
- OCLC: 506556

Lesbian/Woman (1972; second edition 1991) is a work by the feminist and gay rights activists Del Martin and Phyllis Lyon, in which the authors discuss what it means to be a lesbian. The book was influential and is considered a foundational text of lesbian feminism. Reviewers believed that it benefited from its authors' personal experience as lesbians, and endorsed its criticisms of the treatment of lesbians by religious and professional organizations.

== Summary ==
Martin and Lyon discuss lesbianism, arguing that the subject is surrounded by "myths and stereotypes", such as the idea that being a lesbian is solely or primarily a matter of sexual behavior and feelings, that lesbians molest children and seduce young women, and that a woman's sexual orientation can be determined from her appearance. They argue that lesbian women are diverse and have a range of different experiences and backgrounds. They describe their personal experiences as lesbians, and write that for a woman being a lesbian is "a way of life" that "involves the structure of her whole personality". Other topics explored include butch and femme roles.

Martin and Lyon argue that a woman's sexual orientation depends upon her individual experiences and reactions to them, and that it can develop slowly, emerging from her awareness as a girl that she felt different.

== Publication history ==
First published in 1972, Lesbian/Woman was republished in an expanded edition in 1991.

== Reception ==
=== Early reviews ===
Lesbian/Woman received a positive review from Carol Leard in The Body Politic and a mixed review from Diane Trzcinski in Lesbian Tide. The book was also reviewed by Sisters, Amazon Quarterly, the Journal of Sex Research, and Julia P. Stanley in the Journal of Homosexuality.

Leard considered Lesbian/Woman "positive and enlightened", and credited Martin and Lyon with demonstrating "a full and realistic appreciation of what it means to be a woman and a Lesbian in contemporary society", and having provided an "authentic and factual" discussion of the topic that benefited from their personal experience as lesbians. She considered the book a useful counter to stereotypes about lesbians and welcomed its advice to parents not to send their daughters to therapists interested in changing their sexual orientation. She found the final chapter "liberating in itself" in its "vibrant demand for liberation", endorsing its criticism of "the Church and professional associations".

Trzcinski wrote that Lesbian/Woman would prove useful to feminists because of its history of the lesbian and lesbian feminist movements in the United States. She maintained that it benefited from Martin and Lyon's personal experience as lesbians, and credited them with accurately assessing the "three main sources of institutionalized oppression of lesbians" as organized religion, the medical profession, and the government. She also endorsed Martin and Lyon's criticism of psychoanalytic theories of lesbianism. However, she found that the book "too often reads as an apology", and believed that Martin and Lyon were wrong to demand that society give lesbians love and respect, writing that this was impossible given "the way society is presently constituted". She also questioned why lesbians should want the love and respect of society, given the way it treated them. She also maintained that while Martin and Lyon's account of lesbianism was accurate as far as it went, it ignored "the various alternatives now open to lesbians."

=== Later evaluations ===
Jennifer Terry described Lesbian/Woman as "a foundational text of lesbian-feminism". She commented that in many respects it, "resembles previous social scientific surveys and early psychiatric case histories produced as a result of voluntary lesbian participation in studies." She added that, "One can identify a similarity in the discursive structure of the subjects' self-descriptions reported in Lesbian/Woman and those of the early psychiatric interviews that were part of the Sex Variants study of the 1930s."

In 2004, The Advocate listed Lesbian/Woman as one of the "100 Best Lesbian and Gay Nonfiction Books" ever written. Tina Gianoulis, writing for GLBTQ Social Sciences, described Lesbian/Woman as an influential book, adding that Martin and Lyon's understanding of what it means to be a lesbian "not only opened the door for women who had never been sexual with women to see themselves as lesbians, but it also laid the foundation for a woman-identified subculture that became the basis for the lesbian movement of the 1970s." Gianoulis added that it was Martin and Lyon's "most significant book" and that it "remains a crucial account of American lesbian life in the twentieth century".

== See also ==
- Biology and sexual orientation
- Environment and sexual orientation
