= Scott's Pit =

Lesbian biker bar in San Francisco, California (1970–1984)

Scott's Pit Scott's P.I.T.

Restaurant information
- Established: 1970
- Closed: 1984
- Location: 10 Sanchez Street, San Francisco, California, U.S.
- Coordinates: 37.769134°N 122.431632°W

Scott's Pit (sometimes written as Scott's P.I.T.) was a lesbian biker bar in operation from 1970 until 1984 in Duboce Triangle neighborhood in San Francisco, California, U.S. This was the first lesbian biker bar in the city, and the former location has been considered an important building in LGBT history.

== History ==
Scott's Pit was owned and managed by Iowa native Charlene "Scotty" Scott, who also co-owned the Highlander Bar in Potrero Hill. This was the first lesbian biker bar in San Francisco; and a home of brawls and poetry readings. It always had a mixed-gender clientele, but was primarily known as a lesbian bar. Various women's groups and women's political organizations met at the bar. In 1973 and 1974, the Lesbian Mothers Union held benefit auctions and events at Scott's Pit, that included guest auctioneers like José Sarria.

The former space at 10 Sanchez Street has been considered an important building in LGBT history, but since closing the bar the building has been converted in to a garage for a private residence.

== See also ==
- List of lesbian bars
- Samois, American lesbian feminist BDSM organization (1978–1983)
