= Emily Skeggs =

American actress and singer (born 1990)

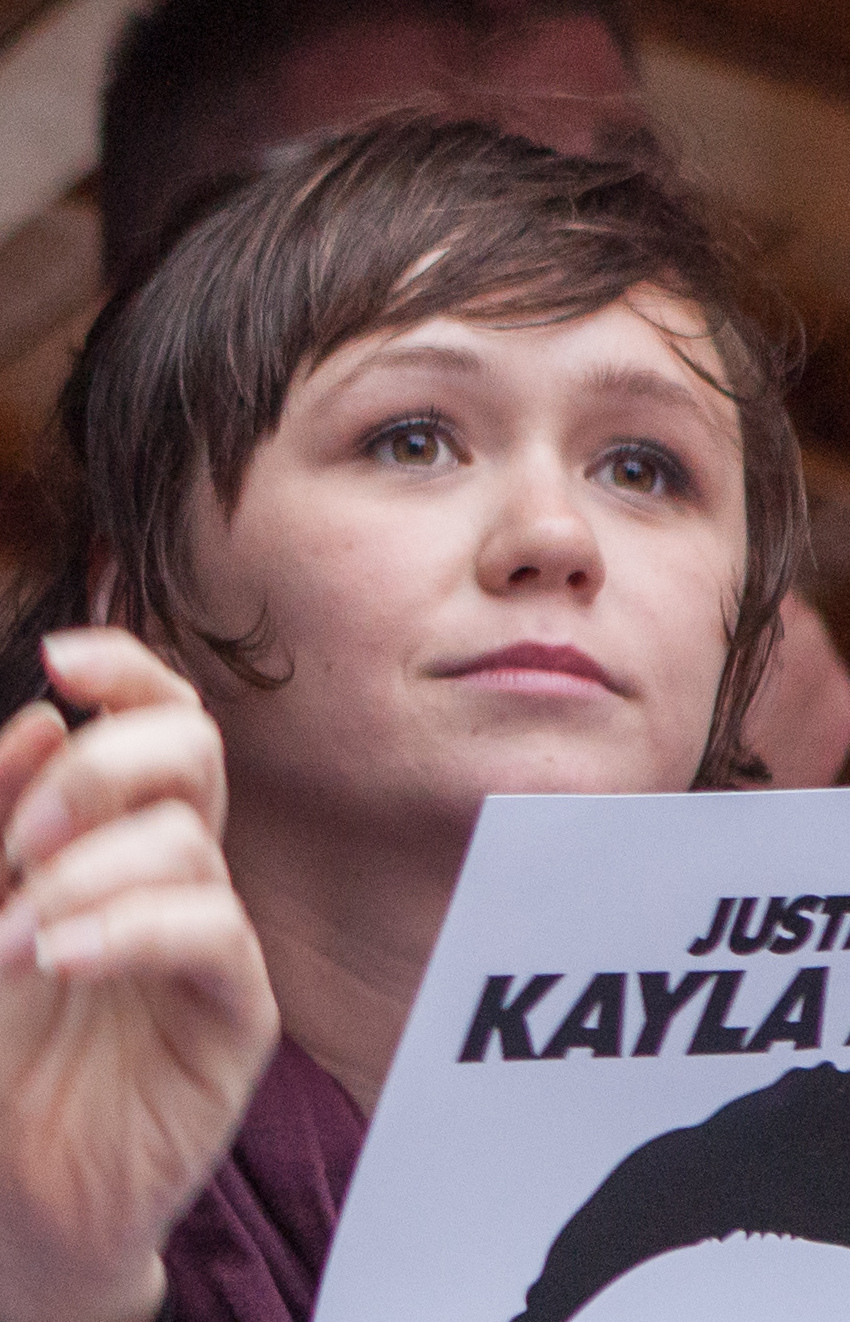
- Skeggs at the San Francisco Trans March in 2017
- Born: New York City, U.S.
- Education: Emerson College
- Occupations: Actress; Singer
- Years active: 2008–present

Emily Skeggs is an American actress and singer. She was nominated for the Tony Award for Best Featured Actress in a Musical in 2015 for playing the role of Medium Alison in Fun Home.

== Career ==
Skeggs played Muriel in Take Me Along at the Off-Broadway Irish Rep in 2008. The production was nominated for the Drama Desk Award for Outstanding Revival. That year she also performed in the musical Ripcords at the New York International Fringe Festival in August.

Skeggs played Rebecca in the Huntington Theatre Company (Boston, Massachusetts) production of Our Town in December 2012. She returned to the Irish Rep in 2014 in the musical Transport, in which she played "Polly Cantwell". Also in 2014, she appeared in the Signature Theatre Company's production of And I and Silence as Young Dee.

Skeggs was the understudy in the Off-Broadway production of Fun Home in 2013 for the roles of Joan and Medium Alison. She replaced Alexandra Socha (who departed the show for personal reasons) in the role of Medium Alison in November 2013. She reprised this role for the Broadway production in 2015, when she made her Broadway debut. Skeggs was nominated for the Tony Award for Best Featured Actress in a Musical, and received a Theatre World Award for her performance.

In 2017, she played the role of activist Roma Guy (when young) in ABC's miniseries When We Rise (2017). The eight-part series is about the LGBT civil rights movement in the United States over several decades.

Skeggs starred in the critically acclaimed comedy Dinner in America, which premiered at Sundance in 2020. She earned praise for her performance opposite Kyle Gallner. The film developed a cult following in 2024 after it was rediscovered and gained popularity on TikTok, particularly for her rendition of the film's original song "Watermelon".

== Credits ==
=== Theatre ===
Year	Title	Role	Location	Category	Notes
Unknown	Dancing at Lughnasa	Rose	Mercutio Troupe	Regional	
2008	Take Me Along	Muriel McComber	Irish Repertory Theatre	Off-Broadway	
2008	Ripcords	Susan Davies	New York International Fringe Festival	Regional	
2012	Our Town	Rebecca Gibbs	Huntington Theatre	Regional	
2013	Fun Home	Medium Alison/Joan	Public Theater	Off-Broadway	Understudy
2013–2014	Fun Home	Medium Alison	Public Theater	Off-Broadway	Replaced Alexandra Socha
2014	Transport	Polly Cantwell	Irish Repertory Theatre	Off-Broadway	
2014	And I And Silence	Young Dee	Signature Theatre	Off Broadway	
2015–2016	Fun Home	Medium Alison	Circle in the Square Theatre	Broadway	
2025	Big Bear	Helene	The Elysian Theater	Los Angeles	

=== Film ===
Year	Title	Role	Notes
2010	Mad Mooney's Lake	Kate	Short
2011	Meat Me in Plainville	Emma	Short
2011	Tron Wayne Gacy		
2016	Don't Think Twice	Shy Sarah	
2016	The Ants	Lu	Also writer and producer
2017	A Lack of Dating in Brooklyn	Jocelyn	Short
2018	Mile 22	MIT	
2018	The Miseducation of Cameron Post	Erin	
2020	Dinner in America	Patty	

=== Television ===
Year	Title	Role	Notes
2015	Late Night with Seth Meyers	Medium Allison	Episode: "Ed Helms/Alison Bechdel/Fun Home/Brad Wilk"
2016	Salem	Billy	4 episodes
2017	When We Rise	Young Roma Guy	7 episodes
2019	Love You to Death	Esme Stoller	TV movie

=== Video games ===
Year	Title	Role	Notes
2016	Peter Panic		

== Awards and nominations ==
Year	Award	Category	Nominated Work	Result
2011	LaGuardia Alumni and Friends Award	Outstanding Graduate in Drama		Won
2011	Nicole DuFresne Award	Outstanding Student in Theatre		Won
2011–2013	National Youth Theatre Award	Best Actress in a Musical	City of Angels	Won
2011–2013	EVVY Award	Best Actress	Macbeth	Nominated
2011–2013	EVVY Award	Best Supporting Actress	Much Ado About Nothing	Nominated
2011–2013	EVVY Award	Best Supporting Actress	Dancing at Lughnasa	Nominated
2015	Tony Award	Tony Award for Best Featured Actress in a Musical	Fun Home	Nominated
2015	Theatre World Award		Fun Home	Won
2016	Grammy Award	Best Musical Theater Album	Fun Home	Nominated
