= Bobbi Jean Baker =

American transgender activist and minister (1964–2014)

- Born: March 20, 1964; Memphis, Tennessee
- Died: January 1, 2014 (aged 49)
- Occupations: Activist, minister

Bobbi Jean Baker (March 20, 1964 – January 1, 2014) was an American transgender activist and minister.

== Early life ==
She was born in Memphis, Tennessee, and moved to San Francisco from Tennessee in 1992. Baker struggled with drug use and legal challenges in San Francisco, stating in an interview: "I was doing sex work, smoking crack and on speed, and was a fugitive from justice … I was extradited back to Tennessee to serve a four-year prison sentence."

== Ministry and advocacy work ==
During a multi-day bus ride back to San Francisco following completion of her prison sentence, Baker decided to focus her life on advocacy. In 2001, a supervisor at the Tenderloin AIDS Resource Center gave her a paid position to lead transgender groups. She served as a case manager, domestic violence specialist, housing manager, and peer advocate. Additionally, she was a lay minister at Transcending Transgender Ministries and an ordained minister at City Refuge United Church of Christ, and the West Coast Regional TransSaints Minister of the Fellowship of Affirming Ministries. She served as an adjutant to Bishop Yvette Flunder, who said the following of Baker: "she believed her ministry was to help transgender people reconcile their spirituality but also to help provide practical assistance, such as food housing, and self-care." For over ten years she was part of the transgender group Transcendence Gospel Choir.

== Death and legacy ==
She died at age 49 on January 1, 2014, on New Year's Day after a car crash. After leading a New Year's Eve service at the City of Refuge Oakland, Baker went to deacon Bobby Wiseman's home for a meal. As Wiseman was driving Baker home later that night, their car was hit by another vehicle and Baker was killed.

Footage of an interview with Baker was included in the documentary film Major!, about the life of transgender activist Miss Major Griffin-Gracy. Baker was later portrayed by Jazzmun in the 2017 miniseries When We Rise.
