= When We Rise =

2017 American docudrama miniseries

- Genre: Docudrama
- Created by: Dustin Lance Black
- Directed by: Gus Van Sant; Dee Rees; Thomas Schlamme; Dustin Lance Black
- Starring: Guy Pearce; Mary-Louise Parker; Rachel Griffiths; Michael K. Williams; Austin P. McKenzie; Emily Skeggs; Jonathan Majors; Fiona Dourif; Whoopi Goldberg; Alexandra Grey; Phylicia Rashad
- Narrated by: (see sources)
- Theme music composer: Chris Bacon; Danny Elfman
- Country of origin: United States
- Original language: English
- No. of episodes: 8

Production
- Executive producers: Gus Van Sant; Dustin Lance Black; Laurence Mark; Bruce Cohen
- Running time: 341 minutes
- Production companies: Hungry Jackal Productions; Laurence Mark Productions; ABC Studios

Original release
- Network: ABC
- Release: February 27 – March 3, 2017

When We Rise is an eight-part American docudrama miniseries about the history of LGBTQ rights advocacy in the United States from the 1970s to the 2010s. It was created by Dustin Lance Black and stars Guy Pearce, Rachel Griffiths, Mary-Louise Parker, Michael Kenneth Williams, Austin P. McKenzie, Emily Skeggs, Jonathan Majors, Fiona Dourif, and Sam Jaeger among 30 others. The miniseries premiered on ABC on February 27, 2017, with the rest of its episodes airing March 1 to 3.

== Plot ==
Based on the memoirs of LGBT activist Cleve Jones, When We Rise chronicles the personal and political struggles, set-backs, and triumphs of a diverse group of LGBTQ+ individuals who helped pioneer a portion of the civil rights movement from its infancy in the 20th century to the successes of today. The saga covers 41 years – starting in 1972, shortly after the Stonewall riots – and tells the evolving history of the modern gay rights movement.

== Cast ==
- Guy Pearce as Cleve Jones, LGBT activist
  - Austin P. McKenzie as young Cleve Jones
- Mary-Louise Parker as Roma Guy, activist
  - Emily Skeggs as young Roma Guy
- Rachel Griffiths as Diane Jones, Roma's girlfriend (later wife)
  - Fiona Dourif as young Diane Jones
- Carrie Preston as Sally Miller Gearhart, activist, teacher, and writer
- Michael K. Williams as Ken Jones, activist
  - Jonathan Majors as young Ken Jones
- Jack Plotnick as Gilbert Baker, designer of the rainbow flag
  - Dylan Arnold as young Gilbert Baker
- Ivory Aquino as Cecilia Chung, transgender activist
- Kevin McHale as Bobbi Campbell, AIDS activist
- Dylan Walsh as Dr. Marcus Conant, pioneer in the diagnosis and treatment of AIDS
- Rafael de la Fuente as Ricardo Canto, Cleve's partner
- Caitlin Gerard as Jean, Roma's first girlfriend in San Francisco
- Nick Eversman as Scott Rempel, Cleve's friend in San Francisco who gives his job to Cleve when he leaves for Europe
- Whoopi Goldberg as Pat Norman, the first openly gay employee of the San Francisco Health Department
- Rosie O'Donnell as Del Martin, co-founder of Daughters of Bilitis, the first lesbian civil and political rights organization in the United States
- Maddie Corman as Phyllis Lyon, Del Martin's girlfriend (later wife), fellow activist and co-founder of Daughters of Bilitis
- Denis O'Hare as Jim Foster, an openly gay Democratic party organizer
- David Hyde Pierce as Dr. Jones, Cleve's father
- T. R. Knight as Chad Griffin
- Sam Jaeger as Richard, Ken Jones' long-term partner
- Todd Weeks as Tom Ammiano
- Matthew Del Negro as Gavin Newsom
- Justin Sams as Sylvester
- Alexandra Grey as Seville
- Willam Belli as Jason
- Michael DeLorenzo as José Sarria
- Richard Schiff as Judge Vaughn Walker
- Charlie Carver as Michael Smith, Ken Jones' early partner
- Rob Reiner as David Blankenhorn
- Pauley Perrette as Robin
- William Sadler as Chuck Cooper
- Charles Socarides Jr. as Richard Socarides
- John Rubinstein as Dr. Charles W. Socarides
- Phylicia Rashad as Bishop Yvette A. Flunder
- Jazzmun as Bobbi Jean Baker
- Mary McCormack as Roberta A. Kaplan
- Arliss Howard as Ted Olson
- Henry Czerny as David Boies
- Balthazar Getty as David
- Tyler Young as Matt

== Episodes ==
No.	Title	Directed by	Written by	Original release date	US viewers (millions)
1	"Part I"	Gus Van Sant	Dustin Lance Black	February 27, 2017 (Note: The first two parts of the series received an advance preview screening at the Palm Springs Film Festival on January 12, 2017.)	3.26
1972: Three people—an Arizona peace activist named Cleve Jones, an African-American sailor Ken Jones in Vietnam, and a Boston women's activist Roma Guy—all move to San Francisco to join the nascent gay community.
2	"Part II"	Gus Van Sant	Dustin Lance Black	February 27, 2017	2.64
Roma helps take a stand against the National Organization for Women's attempts to purge lesbians from their ranks. Ken comes to accept—and fight for—his sexuality. After struggling to find San Francisco less welcoming than he'd hoped, Cleve hears of a New Yorker, Harvey Milk, running for election to the San Francisco Board of Supervisors.
3	"Part III"	Dee Rees	Story by : Eileen Myers; Teleplay by : Dustin Lance Black & Dianne Houston	March 1, 2017	2.30
1978–79: Roma sees the establishment of the Women's Building. Harvey Milk runs for the Board of Supervisors against a backdrop of Anita Bryant's Moral Majority and John Briggs's statewide initiative to ban gay people and allies from working with children.
4	"Part IV"	Dee Rees	Story by : Allison Abner and Lisa Zwerling; Teleplay by : Lisa Zwerling	March 1, 2017	1.79
1981: A new disease, initially named gay-related immune deficiency, starts spreading among gay men and drug users in San Francisco. Roma and Diane start a family.
5	"Part V"	Thomas Schlamme	Dustin Lance Black	March 2, 2017	2.00
1992: A decade after the advent of the AIDS Crisis, Cleve (now played by Guy Pearce) unveils the NAMES Project AIDS Memorial Quilt in Washington, D.C., and visits ACT UP in New York as they fight for early clinical trials of new drugs. Ken (now played by Michael K. Williams) finds his life turned upside down when Richard dies of AIDS. Roma and Diane (now played by Mary-Louise Parker and Rachel Griffiths) work with Tom Ammiano to see Carole Migden elected to the Board of Supervisors—and find out he's the biological father of their daughter Annie.
6	"Part VI"	Thomas Schlamme	Dustin Lance Black	March 2, 2017	2.03
1997: Ken relies on Cecilia Chung's support as he struggles with addiction at a VA hospital. Cleve visits the Human Rights Campaign in D.C., where Richard Socarides lobbies for Bill Clinton to do better than "don't ask, don't tell" and DOMA. Roma and Diane's daughter Annie struggles with her unconventional background. In Palm Springs, Cleve looks after the child of a drug-addicted neighbor. 2006: Cleve speaks to the interviewer we've seen throughout, against a backdrop of the murder of Matthew Shepard and George W. Bush's proposed Federal Marriage Amendment.
7	"Part VII"	Dustin Lance Black	Dustin Lance Black	March 3, 2017	2.07
2008: As Barack Obama is elected president, California Proposition 8 revokes California's recently-acquired marriage equality, starting Cleve to help organise the National Equality March on Washington, D.C., and advocate for equal rights. Roma, Diane and Tom become grandparents and advocate for citywide universal healthcare in San Francisco. Ken is baptised, but finds some churches are less welcoming than others.
8	"Part VIII"	Dustin Lance Black	Dustin Lance Black	March 3, 2017	2.07
2009–13: Cleve takes the battle against Prop 8 through the federal courts all the way to the Supreme Court. Ken works with Cecilia Chung to get support for his church. Roma and Diane decide to get married if the Supreme Court allows it.

== Production ==
=== Filming ===
The series is eight hours long in seven parts. Gus Van Sant directed the first two-hour part, Dee Rees parts two and three, Thomas Schlamme parts four and five, and Black parts six and seven. The series is partially inspired by the memoir by LGBT activist Cleve Jones, When We Rise: My Life in the Movement. Van Sant and Black previously collaborated on Milk, which likewise featured Cleve Jones as a major character.

=== Casting ===
On March 15, 2016, Carrie Preston was cast as Sally Gearhart. Guy Pearce as Cleve Jones, Mary-Louise Parker as Roma Guy, Rachel Griffiths as Diane, Michael K. Williams as Ken Jones, Ivory Aquino as Cecilia Chung, Kevin McHale as Bobbi Campbell, Dylan Walsh as Dr. Marcus Conant, Rafael de la Fuente as Ricardo, Austin P. McKenzie as young Cleve Jones, Emily Skeggs as young Roma Guy, Jonathan Majors as young Ken Jones, Fiona Dourif as young Diane, Whoopi Goldberg as Pat Norman, Rosie O'Donnell as Del Martin, Denis O'Hare as Jim Foster, and David Hyde Pierce as Cleve's father, Dr. Jones, were cast on April 26, 2016, respectively.

On June 22, 2016, T. R. Knight was cast as Chad Griffin and Richard Schiff as Judge Vaughn Walker. Rob Reiner, Pauley Perrette, William Sadler, Phylicia Rashad, Alexandra Grey, Mary McCormack, Arliss Howard, and Henry Czerny were booked as guest stars. Charlie Carver was cast as Michael on November 21, 2016.

=== Music ===
Chris Bacon and Danny Elfman composed the music for the miniseries with various artists, and the soundtrack album is now released at Hollywood Records, Inc and iTunes.

== Broadcast ==
The TV miniseries premiered on ABC on February 27, 2017, at 9 p.m. EST. Originally scheduled to air nightly until March 2, the scheduling was later shifted to accommodate live coverage of the address to a joint session of Congress by President Donald Trump on February 28; the first episode remained scheduled to air on February 27, with the remaining three episodes airing from March 1 to 3.

== Reception ==
=== Critical response ===
Review aggregator Rotten Tomatoes gives the series an approval rating of 82% based on 34 reviews, with an average rating of 6.70/10. The site's critical consensus reads, "When We Rise works as a well-meaning outreach project with a decent cast, even if the script's ambitious reach slightly exceeds its grasp." On Metacritic, the series has a score of 67 out of 100, based on 24 critics, indicating "generally favorable reviews".

Daniel Fienberg of The Hollywood Reporter wrote in his review of the first part of the miniseries: "In a film festival environment, in which stories of otherness and barrier-breaking are part of the expected tapestry, When We Rise might play as a bit quaint, muted and smoothed out for mainstream audiences, which it very clearly is. But even in 2017, when we like to think that boundaries have been pushed a fair amount and that the voices being heard are as diverse as ever, When We Rise feels like a rather astounding thing to find on network TV."

James Poniewozik of The New York Times wrote in his review: "When We Rise, ABC's sweeping four-night history of the gay rights movement, is a rebuttal. As a television drama, it often plays like a high-minded, dutiful educational video. But at its best moments, it's also a timely statement that identity is not just an abstraction but a matter of family, livelihood, life and death."

Greg Braxton of the Los Angeles Times wrote in his review: "It could've been a scene from any of the recent protests that have arisen in the stormy first weeks of the Donald Trump presidency. But peering closer—at the '70s garb, the cameras recording the scene—reveals that this was a re-creation of another, similarly tumultuous, time. [...] The writer-director is still optimistic that When We Rise will appeal to a mainstream audience—including Trump supporters—because of its focus on family, emotion and perseverance."

Danette Chavez of The A.V. Club wrote in her review: "When We Rise isn't laboring in another production's shadow, though; instead, it tries very hard to bring all of those moments and history makers to light. This is obviously a huge undertaking, one that traces the converging paths of gay activists who thwarted Prop 6, were later devastated by the rise of AIDS, but then rallied back to win marriage equality in 2015. Those battles weren't all fought by the exact same people, which pushes the scope of the miniseries even further. But a central trio of characters anchors the story, which runs through four decades (1971 to 2015, roughly)."

When We Rise received a nomination for Best Miniseries at the 2018 Satellite Awards and won the GLAAD Media Award for Outstanding TV Movie or Limited Series at the 29th GLAAD Media Awards.

== Historical accuracy ==
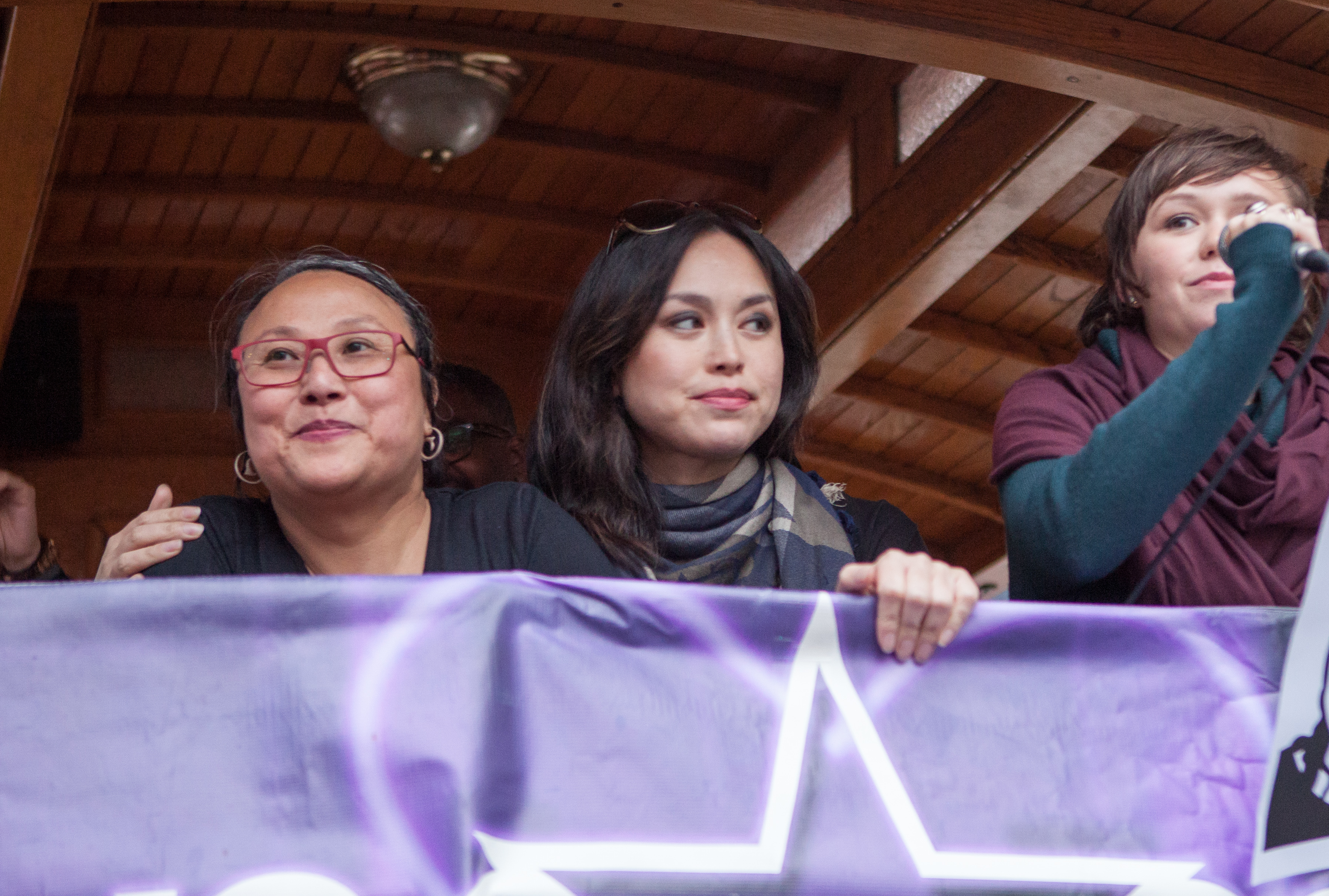
Cecilia Chung with actors Ivory Aquino and Emily Skeggs at Trans March San Francisco, June 2017

Although there were some non-factual elements, Cleve Jones (one of the principal gay activists depicted) stated that the small, factual changes Black and his team made to the 50-year history of specific characters and events portrayed do not dilute the overall truthfulness and realness of the miniseries. Black spent four years researching and writing the script, consulting as many of the real life figures as possible and many of the actors were able to meet with the individuals they portrayed. The episodes often contain archival footage of actual events.
