= Andrea R. Canaan =

American writer and feminist (born 1950)

Andrea R Canaan
- Born: 1950 (age 75–76); New Orleans, Louisiana, U.S.
- Other names: Andrea Ruth Canaan; Andrea Ruth Ransom Canaan
- Education: Tulane University (MSW); University of San Francisco (MFA)
- Occupation: Author
- Known for: Feminism, social activism
- Notable work: Browness. in This Bridge Called My Back (1981)
- Website: andreacanaan.wordpress.com

Andrea R. Canaan (born 1950) is a Black feminist writer, speaker, community organizer, poet and activist.

== Early life and education ==
Canaan was born in New Orleans, Louisiana in 1950. She was raised in a close activist and spiritual community. At twelve years old, Canaan was raped by a Methodist minister where she also faced abuse from a female church camp counselor. Canaan has also intimated that her mother was aware of this abuse and did nothing to help her child. Canaan has referenced this abuse in her work by touching upon themes of religious abuses of power and clergy misconduct.

Canaan holds a M.S.W. from University of Tulane and a M.F.A. in non-fiction from the University of San Francisco.

In 2018, she received a second M.F.A. in fiction from Goddard College in Vermont.

In the 1980s, Canaan served as the Director of Women and Employment which helps place women in non-traditional jobs.

== Work ==
Canaan's creative passion is personal wholeness, the transformation of shame into courage for herself and in the lives of other black women. Her work explores themes of black womanhood, sexual abuse, identity labels, and friendships between black women.

== Bibliography ==
- This Bridge Called My Back
- The Salt Box House on Bayou Black (TBA)

=== Book chapters ===
- Canaan, Andrea (1994), "I call up names: facing childhood sexual abuse", in White, Evelyn C. (ed.), The Black women's health book, Seattle: Seal Press, pp. 78–81, ISBN 9781878067401.
- Canaan, Andrea (1987), "God bless the child", in Pollack, Sandra J.; Vaughn, Jeanne (eds.), Politics of the heart: a lesbian parenting anthology, Ithaca, N.Y.: Firebrand Books, pp. 279–285, ISBN 9780932379351.
