= Cleve Jones =

American LGBTQ rights and AIDS activist (born 1954)

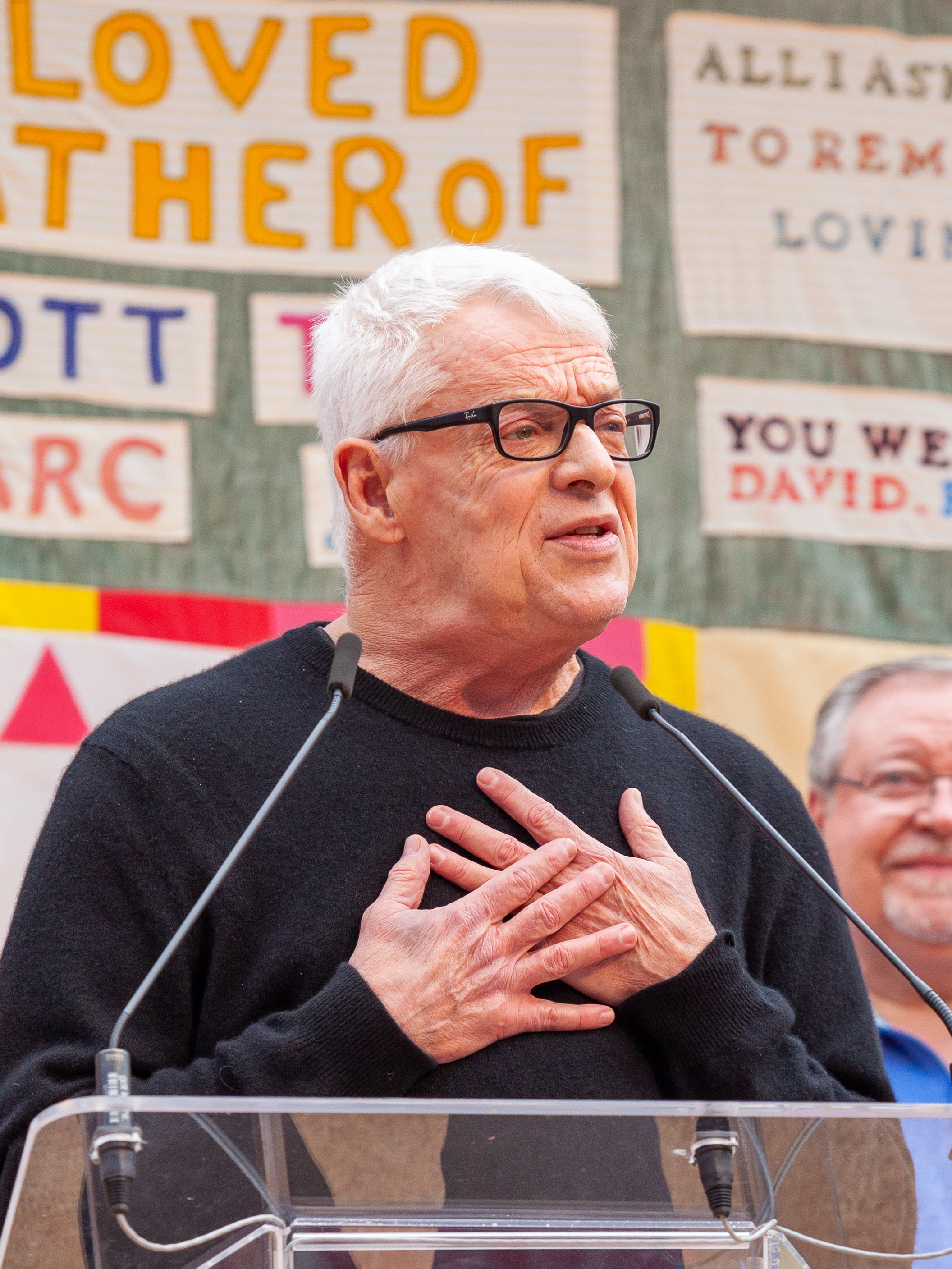
- Jones speaking at the National AIDS Memorial on World AIDS Day, 2019
- Born: October 11, 1954 (age 71); West Lafayette, Indiana, U.S.
- Education: San Francisco State University
- Occupation: LGBT rights activist
- Known for: NAMES Project AIDS Memorial Quilt
- Website: clevejones.com

Cleve Jones (born October 11, 1954) is an American AIDS and LGBT rights activist. He conceived the NAMES Project AIDS Memorial Quilt, which has become, at 54 tons, the world's largest piece of community folk art as of 2020. In 1983 at the onset of the AIDS pandemic, Jones co-founded the San Francisco AIDS Foundation, which has grown into one of the largest and most influential advocacy organizations empowering people with AIDS in the United States.

== Early life ==
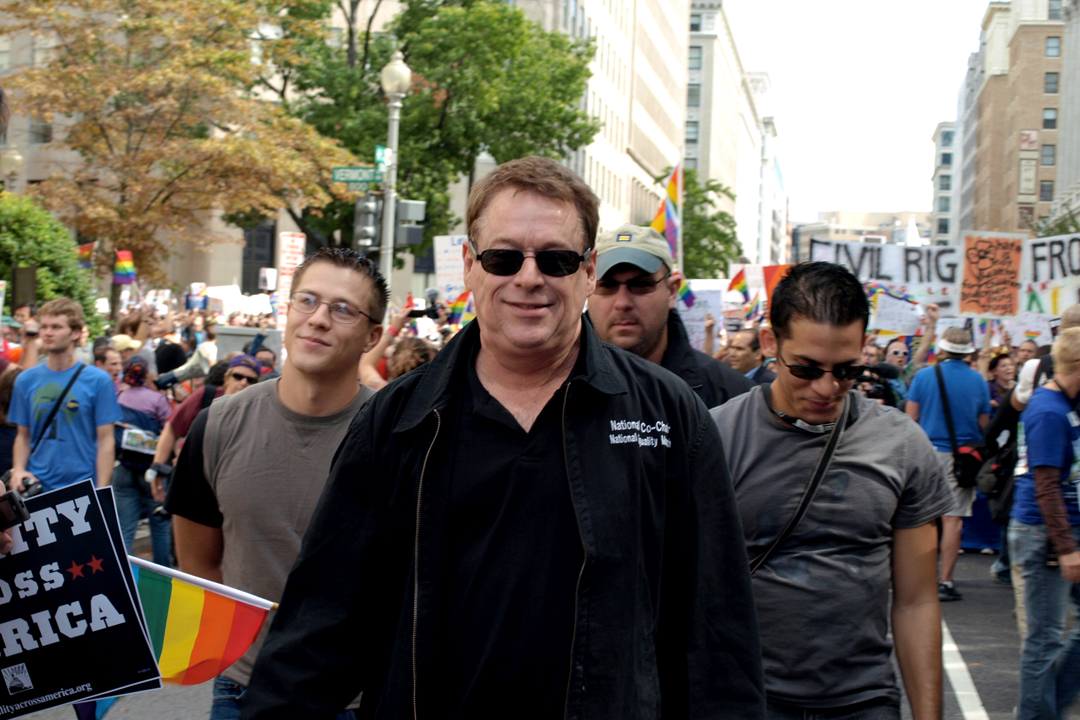
Cleve Jones marching at the National Equality March, 2009

Jones was born in West Lafayette, Indiana. He moved with his family to Scottsdale, Arizona, when he was 14 and was a student at Arizona State University for a time. Jones claimed, however, he never really accepted the Phoenix area as his home. His father was a psychologist and his mother was a Quaker, a faith she held at least in part to benefit her son in the era of the draft for the Vietnam War. He did not reveal his sexual orientation to his parents until he was 18.

His career as an activist began in San Francisco during the turbulent 1970s when, as a newcomer to the city, he was befriended by pioneer gay-rights leader Harvey Milk. Jones worked as a student intern in Milk's office while studying political science at San Francisco State University. During the 1970s, Jones was also involved in the Coors boycott.

== Career ==
In 1981, Jones went to work in the district office of State Assemblyman Art Agnos. In 1982, when AIDS was still a new and largely underestimated threat, Jones co-founded the San Francisco AIDS Foundation, then called the Kaposi's Sarcoma Research and Education Foundation, with Marcus Conant, Frank Jacobson, and Richard Keller. They reorganized as the San Francisco AIDS Foundation in 1984.

Jones conceived the idea of the AIDS Memorial Quilt at a candlelight memorial for Harvey Milk in 1985 and in 1987 created the first quilt panel in honor of his friend Marvin Feldman. The AIDS Memorial Quilt has grown to become the world's largest community arts project, memorializing the lives of over 85,000 Americans killed by AIDS.

Jones ran for a position on the San Francisco Board of Supervisors in the November 3, 1992 election.

Jones has been working with UNITE HERE, the hotel, restaurant, and garment workers' labor union on homophobia issues. He is a driving force behind the Sleep With The Right People campaign, which aims to convince LGBT tourists to stay only in hotels that respect the rights of their workers. Another part of Jones's work with UNITE HERE is making the labor movement more open to LGBTQ members.

In an interview in November 2016 with Terry Gross on NPR radio talk show Fresh Air, Jones described his status as HIV-positive, and said while he first learned of his status when tests for infection came out in the 1980s, he was likely infected with the virus around the winter of 1978 or 1979, based on blood samples collected from him as part of a study he volunteered for.

In the same interview, Jones also talked about the time when he became seriously ill, and how he responded rapidly to the "cocktail" of drugs that fought the virus, in the earliest trials of it. He described his present health as good. The interview was based on Jones's book, When We Rise: My Life in the Movement, and the television program When We Rise, broadcast in February and March 2017 on ABC in the USA. A theme of the interview was that activism saved his life, as he was in the early drug trials, part of the group pushing the FDA (US Food and Drug Administration) to stop doing double-blind trials as soon as it was clear that the cocktail of drugs saved lives.

== Film, theater and major parades ==
Jones is portrayed by actor Emile Hirsch in Milk, director Gus Van Sant's 2008 biopic of Harvey Milk. He is prominently featured in And the Band Played On, Randy Shilts's best-selling 1987 work of non-fiction about the AIDS epidemic in the United States. Jones was also featured in the 1995 documentary film The Castro.

Jones took part in a documentary, Echoes of Yourself in the Mirror, about the HIV/AIDS epidemic, speaking during World AIDS Day in 2005. In the documentary he talks about the idea behind the AIDS Memorial Quilt, as well as the activism of San Francisco citizens in the 1970s and '80s to help people affected by AIDS and to figure out what the disease was. The film also looks at the impact HIV/AIDS is having in communities of color, and the young.

He was one of the Official Grand Marshals of the 2009 NYC LGBT Pride March, produced by Heritage of Pride joining Dustin Lance Black and Anne Kronenberg on June 28, 2009. In August 2009, Jones was an official Grand Marshal of the Vancouver Pride Parade.

He participated as an actor in the Los Angeles premiere of 8, a condensed theatrical re-enactment of the Perry v. Schwarzenegger trial's closure, on March 3, 2012. He is portrayed by actors Austin P. McKenzie and Guy Pearce in the 2017 ABC television miniseries When We Rise, directed by Gus Van Sant. He also had a cameo appearance playing himself in Looking: The Movie in 2016. Additionally, Jones is portrayed by actor Augustus Oicle in the 2023 Showtime limited series, Fellow Travelers, in the episode titled "White Nights."

== See also ==
- LGBT culture in San Francisco

== Bibliography ==
- Jones, Cleve (2016). When We Rise: My Life in the Movement, Hachette Books. ISBN 9780316315432
- Jones, Cleve, with Dawson, Jeff (2000). Stitching a Revolution: The Making of an Activist. ISBN 0062516426
- Shilts, Randy (1982). The Mayor of Castro Street: The Life and Times of Harvey Milk, St. Martin's Press. ISBN 0-312-52330-0
