= Roma Guy =

American LGBT and women's rights activist

- Born: 1942 (age 83–84); Maine, USA
- Occupations: Activist for LGBT and women's rights

Roma Guy (born 1942) is an American LGBT- and women's-rights activist. She is openly lesbian and married her life partner in 2008.

Born and educated in Maine, she earned a Master's in Social Work at the University of Maine. After graduate school, she worked for several years with the Peace Corps in Africa, and also studied community organizing and urban planning at Wayne State University. She is especially known for her activism and achievements in San Francisco, where she moved in the 1970s.

== Biography ==
In 1962 Guy joined the Peace Corps and was among the first group of volunteers invited to Cote d’Ivoire, West Africa. She worked to create a center for literacy and health education, as well as creating programs.

In 1967-68 she enrolled in the MSW program at Wayne State University, where she studied community organizing and urban planning. She worked on organizing at an elementary school in the Black community in Detroit.

In 1972 Guy was recruited by the Peace Corps to direct a training program in Togo. There she met Diane Jones, another American Peace Corps volunteer. She supported health clinics at her site. After Jones returned to the US, she became certified as an RN. She has had a career in nursing and education.

The two women developed a life partnership. In the early 1970s they moved to San Francisco. They were two of the cofounders of The Women's Building. Guy was also a cofounder of La Casa de las Madres, SF Women Against Rape, and The Women's Foundation of California.

Guy also advocated for women's access to health care in San Francisco, including family planning and abortion services. She served for twelve years on the Health Commission of the City and County of San Francisco.

From 1994 to 2007 Guy served as a professor in the Department of Health Education at San Francisco State University. As of 2017 she is director of the Bay Area Homelessness Program.

== Honors ==
In 2014 the San Francisco Health Commission adopted a "Resolution Recognizing the Life & Legacy of Roma Guy". In 2018 Guy was chosen by the National Women's History Project as one of its honorees for Women's History Month in the United States.

Guy is featured in ABC's miniseries about LGBTQ rights, titled When We Rise (2017).
