= Richard Socarides =

American lawyer

- Born: November 8, 1954 (age 71); New York City, New York
- Education: Antioch College (BA); Hofstra University (JD)
- Occupations: Attorney, businessman, communications & marketing executive, legal counsellor, journalist, LGBT+ rights activist, political pundit & strategist, public relations officer, venture capitalist, writer
- Relatives: Charles Socarides (father)

Richard Socarides is an American lawyer and businessman.

He is the founder and CEO of Kozani Capital LLC, a venture capital and corporate advisory firm. Previously, he was head of global corporate communications and government affairs for Gerson Lehrman Group (GLG). Socarides has also led communications at New Line Cinema and has held other senior media jobs at Time Warner, AOL and in government and politics.

He is an American Democratic political strategist. In his line of work he has written for The New Yorker and has been a TV commentator and a New York attorney. He was a White House adviser under United States President Bill Clinton from 1993 to 1999 in a variety of senior positions, including as Special Assistant to the President and Senior Adviser for Public Liaison. He worked on legal, policy and political issues and served as principal adviser to Clinton on gay and lesbian civil rights issues. Under Clinton, he was chief operating officer of the 1999 Washington summit on the 50th anniversary of the North Atlantic Treaty Organization (NATO). Socarides also worked as special assistant to former junior senator Tom Harkin.

Socarides has written extensively on political and legal topics in his regular column in The New Yorker, as well as for The Washington Post, The Wall Street Journal, and Politico. He is a frequent commentator on television. Socarides, who is openly gay, was the founding president of Equality Matters in 2011. He is the son of Charles Socarides (1922–2005), a psychiatrist and psychoanalyst who was an outspoken critic of the American Psychiatric Association's 1973 decision to remove homosexuality from its list of mental disorders. In 1992, the elder Socarides co-founded NARTH, in response to the American Psychoanalytic Association's 1992 decision to change its position on homosexuality.

== Media portrayal ==
A portion of Socarides's time in the Clinton administration was portrayed by his younger brother, Charles Socarides Jr., in the 2017 docudrama miniseries When We Rise, created and written by Dustin Lance Black.

== Honors and awards ==
Socarides received the Public Service Award from the Human Rights Campaign and has appeared on the Financial Times list of 100 Top Global LGBTQ+ Executives and the Out 100.

== Articles and opinion pieces ==
- Where's Our 'Fierce Advocate'? The Washington Post, May 2, 2009.
- Ask Obama About Don't Ask, Don't Tell: Gay voters are growing impatient for equality. The Wall Street Journal, January 24, 2010.
- Obama Is Missing in Action on Gay Rights: Ted Olson is on the right side of history. When will the president step up? The Wall Street Journal, June 25, 2010.
- A way forward on gay marriage. Politico.com, August 18, 2010.
- The Choice to Defend DOMA, and Its Consequences. AmericaBlog.com, June 14, 2009.
- A Summer for Gay Rights. HuffingtonPost.com, June 18, 2010.
- ""Exactly Why We Have Courts, Why We Have the Constitution and Why We Have the 14th Amendment". HuffingtonPost.com, January 11, 2010.
- Why Equality Matters. Equality Matters, December 19, 2010.
- "Corporate America's evolution on L.G.B.T. rights". The New Yorker. April 27, 2015.

Book chapters

- H. W. Wilson Company (2017). "Corporate America's evolution on L.G.B.T. rights". In Richard Socarides (ed.). LGBTQ in the 21st century. Reference shelf. Vol. 89. Amenia, NY; Hackensack: Grey House Publishing; Salem Press. ISBN 9781682174548. OCLC 1000153768.
