= Sarah Steele =

American actress

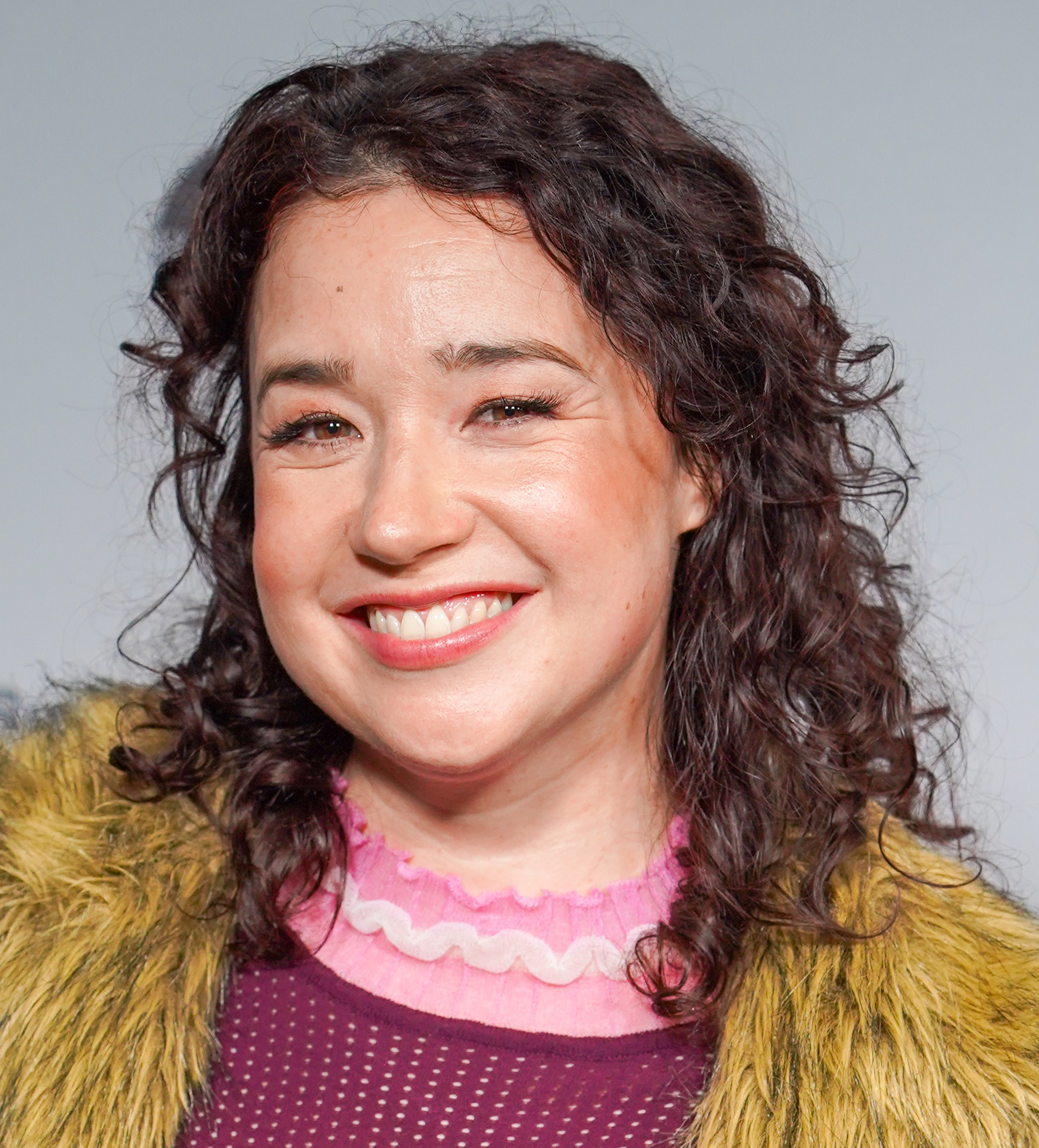
- Steele in 2026
- Born: Philadelphia, Pennsylvania, U.S.
- Education: Columbia University (BA)
- Occupation: Actress
- Years active: 2003–present
- Mother: Katherine A. High

Sarah Steele is an American actress. She is known for her role as Marissa Gold on the CBS legal drama series The Good Wife (2011–2016) and its CBS All Access spinoff series The Good Fight (2017–2022) and Elsbeth.

== Early life ==
Steele was born in Philadelphia, Pennsylvania. Her mother, Katherine A. High, is a hematology oncology physician at the University of Pennsylvania, and her father, George Steele, is an internal medicine physician specializing in nutrition who was on the faculty of the University of Pennsylvania School of Medicine. Steele graduated with the class of 2006 from The Episcopal Academy, a private school in southeast Pennsylvania. She graduated from Columbia University in 2011 with a B.A. in English.

== Career ==
Steele had her breakout role as Bernice in the 2004 comedy drama film Spanglish. Steele went on to appear in an episode of the crime drama series Law & Order; the dark comedy film Mr. Gibb, which co-stars Hayden Panettiere, Tim Daly and Dan Hedaya; and the drama film Margaret, which co-stars Matt Damon, Matthew Broderick, Anna Paquin, Mark Ruffalo, and Allison Janney.

Steele appeared in the Off-Broadway production of The Prime of Miss Jean Brodie, which ran in September 2006 to December 2006 at the Acorn Theater. From 2007 to 2008, she appeared in the Off-Broadway play Speech & Debate. From January to March 2012 she appeared in the Off-Broadway play Russian Transport at the Acorn Theatre, playing the role of Mira. In late 2014, Steele made her Broadway debut in The Country House by Donald Margulies, playing the granddaughter, Susie, opposite Blythe Danner. In 2015, she appeared in the play The Humans, first Off-Broadway and then on Broadway. She has also appeared in other Off-Broadway and regional productions.

In 2009, Steele appeared on Gossip Girl as Kira Abernathy, Jenny Humphrey's rival at Cotillion and Eric van der Woodsen's friend. Steele appeared in three episodes of The Good Wife in 2011 as Marissa Gold, the daughter of Eli Gold (Alan Cumming). She reprised the role from 2014 to 2016 in the show's later seasons, appearing in a total of 22 episodes. She went on to reprise the role of Marissa Gold in the Good Wife spinoff series The Good Fight, which premiered on CBS All Access in 2017, and in CBS's Elsbeth. In December 2025, it was announced that Steele will recur in the second season of NBC's Brilliant Minds.

== Filmography ==
=== Film ===
Year	Title	Role	Notes
2004	Spanglish	Bernice "Bernie" Clasky	
2006	The Good Student	Amber Jinx	
2008	Man	Maggie	Short film
2008	The Lucky Ones	Girl with Jacket	
2008	Old Days	Carla	Short film
2009	My Father's Will	Nancy Curtis	
2010	Please Give	Abby	
2010	Monkeywrench	Girl	Short film
2011	Margaret	Becky	
2012	Last Kind Words	Katie	
2013	The To Do List	Wendy	
2013	Song One	iPod Autograph Girl	
2014	The Mend	Sarah	
2014	Relics	Shelley	Short film
2014	Adult Beginners	Sarah	
2014	All Relative	Beth	
2014	Symposium	Ellie	Short film
2014	Stag	Francesca	Short film
2016	The Homeless Billionaire	Nancy Curtis	
2017	Speech & Debate	Diwata Jones	
2017	Permission	Stevie	
2018	Ask for Jane	Donna	
2020	Viena and the Fantomes	Loona	
2023	You Hurt My Feelings	Frankie	

=== Television ===
Year	Title	Role	Notes
2006	Law & Order	Katie White	Episode: "Cost of Capital"
2008	Law & Order: Criminal Intent	Tessa Nobile	Episode: "Legacy"
2009	Gossip Girl	Kira Abernathy	2 episodes
2011–2016	The Good Wife	Marissa Gold	22 episodes
2011	Harry's Law	Sela Vinson	Episode: "Queen of Snark"
2013	Lady Business	Jackie	Episode: "The Intern"
2013	Blue Bloods	Rebecca	Episode: "Men in Black"
2013	Nurse Jackie	Hannah Cohen	2 episodes
2014	Girls	Rebecca	Episode: "Flo"
2016	Bull	Ellen Huff	Episode: "Unambiguous"
2017–2022	The Good Fight	Marissa Gold	Main role; 58 episodes
2020–2022	The Accidental Wolf	Shelly	3 episodes
2022	Would I Lie to You?	Herself	Episode: "Allowance PowerPoint"
2023	The Marvelous Mrs. Maisel	Petra	Episode: "The Princess and the Plea"
2025	Elsbeth	Marissa Gold	2 episodes
2025	Brilliant Minds	Sofia	2 episodes

== Theatre ==
Year	Title	Role	Venue	Notes
2006	The Prime of Miss Jean Brodie	Monica	Off-Broadway / Acorn Theater	
2007	Speech & Debate	Diwata	Off Broadway / Roundabout Underground	
2011	All-American	Natasha Gordon	Off-Broadway / The Duke on 42nd Street	
2012	Russian Transport	Mira	Off-Broadway / Acorn Theater	
2012	Slowgirl	Becky	Off-Broadway / Claire Tow Theater	
2014	The Country House	Susie Keegan	Broadway / Samuel J Friedman Theatre	
2015	The Humans	Brigid Blake	Off-Broadway / Laura Pels Theatre	
2016	The Humans	Brigid Blake	Broadway / Helen Hayes Theatre	Drama Desk Award winner for Outstanding Ensemble Performance
2018	The Humans	Brigid Blake	Tour / Ahmanson Theatre (Los Angeles)	Original Broadway cast replaced tour cast for the final tour stop in LA
2023	I Can Get It for You Wholesale	Blanche Bushkin	Off-Broadway / CSC Theatre	

== Awards and nominations ==
Year	Association	Category	Work	Result
2004	Phoenix Film Critics Society Awards	Best Performance by Youth in a Leading or Supporting Role – Female	Spanglish	Won
2005	Young Artist Awards	Best Performance in a Feature Film – Supporting Young Actress	Spanglish	Nominated
2010	Gotham Awards	Best Ensemble Performance	Please Give	Nominated
2011	Dorian Awards	Rising Star of the Year	Please Give	Nominated
2011	Independent Spirit Awards	Robert Altman Award	Please Give	Won
2016	Drama Desk Awards	Outstanding Ensemble Performance	The Humans	Won
