= Del Martin and Phyllis Lyon =

American feminists and gay-rights activists

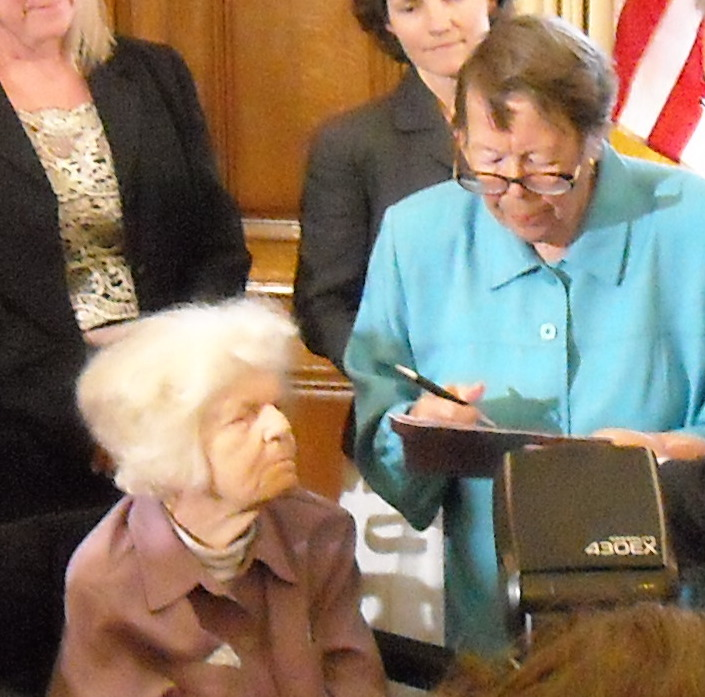
Wedding of Martin and Lyon, 2008

Dorothy Louise Taliaferro "Del" Martin (May 5, 1921 – August 27, 2008) and Phyllis Ann Lyon (November 10, 1924 – April 9, 2020) were an American lesbian couple based in San Francisco who were known as feminist and gay-rights activists.

Martin and Lyon met in 1950, became lovers in 1952, and moved in together on Valentine's Day 1953 in an apartment on Castro Street in San Francisco. They had been together for three years when they cofounded the Daughters of Bilitis (DOB) in San Francisco in 1955. This became the first social and political organization for lesbians in the United States and soon had a national reach. They both acted as president and until 1963 successively as editor of The Ladder magazine, which they also founded. They were involved in the DOB until they joined the National Organization for Women (NOW), the first known lesbian couple to do so.

Both women worked to form the Council on Religion and the Homosexual (CRH) at Glide Memorial Methodist Church in northern California to persuade ministers to accept homosexuals into churches. The couple used their influence to decriminalize homosexuality in the late 1960s and early 1970s. They became politically active in San Francisco's first gay political organization, the Alice B. Toklas Democratic Club. This group influenced then-mayor Dianne Feinstein to sponsor a citywide bill to outlaw employment discrimination for gays and lesbians. Both women remained politically active, later serving in the White House Conference on Aging in 1995.

They were married on February 12, 2004, in the first same-sex wedding to take place in San Francisco after Mayor Gavin Newsom ordered the city clerk to begin providing marriage licenses to same-sex couples. That marriage was voided by the California Supreme Court on August 12, 2004.

After the California Supreme Court's decision in In re Marriage Cases legalized same-sex marriage in California, the couple married again on June 16, 2008. Theirs was the first same-sex wedding to take place in San Francisco . Two months later on August 27, 2008, Martin died in San Francisco from complications of an arm bone fracture. Lyon died years later on April 9, 2020.

== Del Martin ==
Del Martin
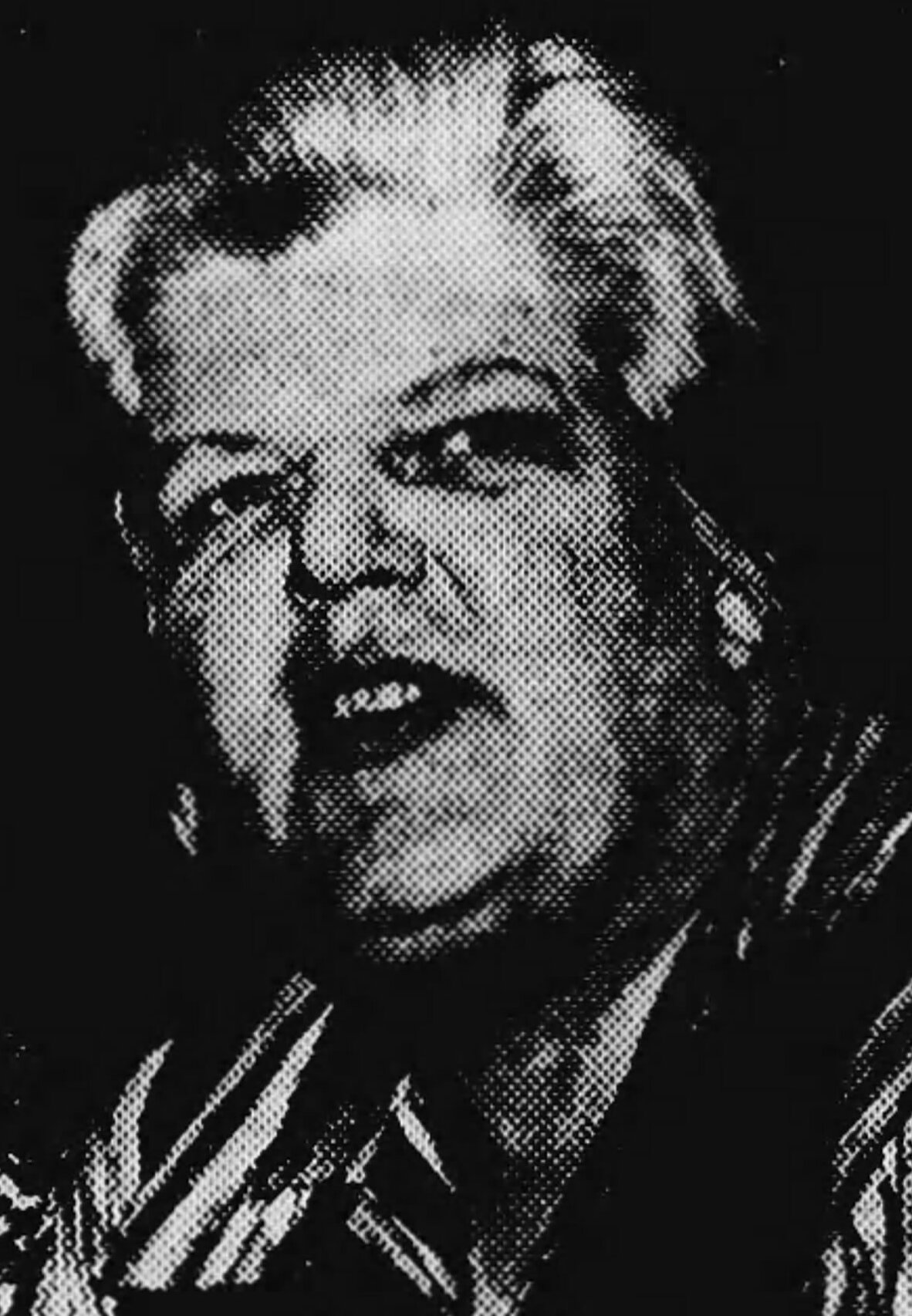
- Del Martin in 1972
- Born: Dorothy Louise Taliaferro; May 5, 1921; San Francisco, California, U.S.
- Died: August 27, 2008 (aged 87); San Francisco, California, U.S.
- Education: University of California, Berkeley; San Francisco State University (BA); Institute for Advanced Study of Human Sexuality (MA, DArts)
- Known for: Daughters of Bilitis
- Spouses: James Martin (m. 1940; div. 1944) Phyllis Lyon (m. 2004; voided 2004) (m. 2008)
- Children: Kendra Mon

Del Martin was born as Dorothy Louise Taliaferro on May 5, 1921, in San Francisco. She was the first salutatorian to graduate from George Washington High School. She was educated at the University of California, Berkeley and at San Francisco State College, where she studied journalism. She earned a Doctor of Arts degree from the Institute for Advanced Study of Human Sexuality. She was married for four years to James Martin and retained his name after their divorce. She had one daughter, Kendra Mon. Martin died on August 27, 2008, at UCSF Hospice in San Francisco, from complications of an arm bone fracture. She was 87 years old. Her wife, Phyllis, was at her side. San Francisco mayor Gavin Newsom ordered that the flags at City Hall be flown at half-staff in her honor.

In 1977, Martin became an associate of the Women's Institute for Freedom of the Press (WIFP). WIFP is an American nonprofit publishing organization. The organization works to increase communication among women and connect the public with forms of women-based media.

Martin was also one of the founders of the Lesbian Mothers Union.

== Phyllis Lyon ==
Phyllis Lyon
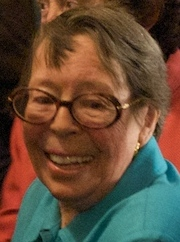
- Lyon in 2008
- Born: Phyllis Ann Lyon; November 10, 1924; Tulsa, Oklahoma, U.S.
- Died: April 9, 2020 (aged 95); San Francisco, California, U.S.
- Education: University of California, Berkeley (BA)
- Known for: Daughters of Bilitis
- Spouses: Del Martin (m. 2004; voided 2004) (m. 2008)

Phyllis Lyon was born on November 10, 1924, in Tulsa, Oklahoma. She held a degree in journalism from the University of California, Berkeley, earned in 1946. During the 1940s, she worked as a reporter for the Chico Enterprise-Record, and during the 1950s, she worked as part of the editorial staff of two Seattle magazines.

In 1968, Lyon began a career as a sex educator with the National Sex and Drug Forum, later the National Sex Forum.

On June 26, 2015, when the U.S. Supreme Court ruled gay marriage legal, the 90-year-old Lyon "laughed and laughed when told the news. 'Well how about that?' she said. 'For goodness' sakes.'" She died on April 9, 2020, at the age of 95.

== Background/marriage ==
Martin and Lyon met in Seattle in 1950 when they began working for the same magazine. They became lovers in 1952 and entered into a partnership in 1953 when they moved to San Francisco together. Many years later, Lyon and Martin recalled how they learned to live together in 1953. "We really only had problems our first year together. Del would leave her shoes in the middle of the room, and I'd throw them out the window", said Lyon, to which Martin responded, "You'd have an argument with me and try to storm out the door. I had to teach you to fight back."

On February 12, 2004, Martin and Lyon were issued a marriage license by the City and County of San Francisco after mayor Gavin Newsom ordered that marriage licenses be given to same-sex couples who requested them.

The license, along with those of several thousand other same-sex couples, was voided by the California Supreme Court on August 12, 2004.

Del is 83 years old and I am 79. After being together for more than 50 years, it is a terrible blow to have the rights and protections of marriage taken away from us. At our age, we do not have the luxury of time.

— Phyllis Lyon

However, they were married again on June 16, 2008, after the California Supreme Court ruled that same-sex marriage was legal. Once again they were the first couple married in San Francisco, in fact the only couple married that day by then-Mayor Newsom personally.

== Activism ==
=== Daughters of Bilitis ===
In 1955, Martin and Lyon and six other lesbian women formed the Daughters of Bilitis (DOB), the first national lesbian organization in the United States. Lyon was the first editor of DOB's newsletter, The Ladder, beginning in 1956. Martin took over editorship of the newsletter from 1960 to 1962. She was succeeded by other editors until the newsletter ended its connection with the Daughters of Bilitis in 1970.

Within five years of its origin, the Daughters of Bilitis had chapters around the country, including Chicago, New York, New Orleans, San Diego, Los Angeles, Detroit, Denver, Cleveland and Philadelphia. There were 500 subscribers to The Ladder but far more readers, as copies were circulated among women who were reluctant to put their names to a subscription list. For their pioneering work on The Ladder, Martin and Lyon were among the first inductees into the LGBT Journalists Hall of Fame, which was established in 2005 by the National Lesbian & Gay Journalists Association. Lyon and Martin remained involved in the DOB until the late 1960s. The Daughters of Bilitis, which had taken a conservative approach to helping lesbians deal with society, disbanded in 1970 due to the rise of more radical activism.

=== National Organization for Women ===
Martin and Lyon were active in the National Organization for Women (NOW) since 1967. Del Martin was the first open lesbian elected to the board of directors of NOW. In 1970, she signaled in an essay the split of lesbian feminists from the male-dominated gay rights movement, characterizing the leaders of that movement as "hollow men of self-proclaimed privilege. They neither speak for us nor to us." Lyon and Martin worked to combat the homophobia they perceived in NOW, and encouraged the National Board of Directors of NOW's 1971 resolution that lesbian issues were feminist issues.

=== San Francisco Commission on the Status of Women ===
In 1977 "Del" Martin was the first openly gay woman to be appointed to the SFCOSW by then Mayor George R. Moscone. Martin joined forces with other minority SFCOSW Commissioners, such as Kathleen Hardiman Arnold (now Kathleen Rand Reed), and Ella Hill Hutch, the first Black woman to be elected to the Board of Supervisors, to focus on the nexus of gay women's rights and racial and ethnic discrimination. In their later work with a health clinic, Martin and Lyon focused, for instance, on the specific health and issues affecting Black and Latina gay women. Martin was ahead of her time in understanding the cultural aspects of gay health.

=== Alice B. Toklas Democratic Club ===
Lyon and Martin were both active in San Francisco's first gay political organization, the Alice B. Toklas Democratic Club, named after San Francisco-born author Alice B. Toklas.

=== Lyon-Martin Health Services ===
Lyon-Martin Health Services was founded in 1979 by a group of medical providers and health activists as a clinic for lesbians who lacked access to non-judgmental and affordable health care. Named after Phyllis Lyon and Del Martin, the clinic soon became a model for culturally-sensitive community-based health care. Since 1993, Lyon-Martin also has provided case management and primary healthcare in programs specifically designed for very low-income and uninsured women with HIV, as well as services for transgender people.

=== Senior activists ===
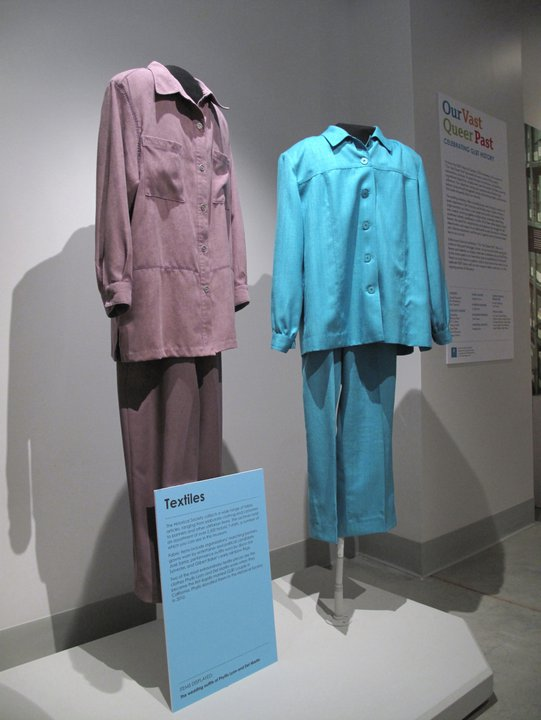
Pantsuits worn by Del Martin and Phyllis Lyon to their weddings in San Francisco in 2004 and 2008; on display at the GLBT History Museum

In 1989, Martin and Lyon joined Old Lesbians Organizing for Change. In 1995 they were named delegates to the White House Conference on Aging, Martin by Senator Dianne Feinstein and Lyon by Congresswoman Nancy Pelosi, both from California.

== Bibliography ==
Books are written by both Martin and Lyon except where noted:

- Lesbian/Woman (1972), about lesbian life in modern America
- Lesbian Love and Liberation (1973), about lesbians and sexual liberty
- Battered Wives (1979), by Martin, blamed American domestic violence on institutionalized misogyny

== Legacy ==
=== Documentary films ===
In 2003 filmmaker JEB (Joan E. Biren) released a documentary film on the couple, No Secret Anymore: The Times of Del Martin and Phyllis Lyon, available from Frameline.

The 1993 documentary Last Call at Maud's also featured Martin and Lyon.

=== Honors ===
In 2014, Martin was one of the inaugural honorees in the Rainbow Honor Walk, a walk of fame in San Francisco's Castro neighborhood noting LGBTQ people who have "made significant contributions in their fields."

In June 2019, Martin was one of the inaugural fifty American "pioneers, trailblazers, and heroes" inducted and listed on the National LGBTQ Wall of Honor within the Stonewall National Monument in New York City's Stonewall Inn.

The Monument is the first U.S. national monument dedicated to LGBTQ rights and history. The wall's unveiling was timed to take place during the 50th anniversary of the Stonewall riots.

In June 2020, Lyon was added to the National LGBTQ Wall of Honor.

== Popular culture ==
Rosie O'Donnell plays Martin and Maddie Corman plays Lyon in the miniseries about LGBT rights called When We Rise.

Season 3, episode 7 of the podcast Making Gay History is about Martin and Lyon.

Shannon Purser plays Martin and Heather Matarazzo plays Lyon in the HBO Max series Equal, formally announced on August 24, 2020.

== Archival sources ==
The extensive records of Lyon and Martin's professional and activist pursuits, including the administrative files of the Daughters of Bilitis, are preserved at the GLBT Historical Society in San Francisco. The collection is fully processed and is available for use by researchers. The Online Archive of California (a project of the California Digital Library) offers the complete finding aid.

== See also ==
- LGBT culture in San Francisco
