= Speech & Debate (play) =

2007 play by Stephen Karam

Speech & Debate is a play written by Stephen Karam. The play concerns three misfit teenagers who live in Salem, Oregon.

== Production history ==
Speech & Debate opened Off-Broadway at Roundabout Underground in October 2007 and ran through February 28, 2008 in a Roundabout Theater Company production. Directed by Jason Moore, the cast featured Gideon Glick (Howie), Sarah Steele (Diwata), Jason Fuchs (Solomon) and Susan Blackwell (Teacher/Reporter).

The play was originally performed as a workshop production at Brown/Trinity Playwrights Repertory Theatre in Providence, Rhode Island in July 2006. It was directed by Lowry Marshall.

Speech & Debate's West Coast premiere was at Artists Repertory Theater in Portland, Oregon, in November to December 2008. Directed by Jon Kretzu, the cast featured Derek Herman (Howie), Jennifer Rowe (Diwata), Adrian de Forest (Solomon) and Allison Frost (Teacher/Reporter).

Speech & Debate was produced at the American Theater Company, Chicago, in May to June 2013, directed by PJ Paparelli. Speech & Debate had its Midwest premiere at the American Theater Company, running from April 16, 2008, to May 11, 2008, also directed by Paparelli.

The play has its UK premiere at the Trafalgar Studios, Westminster, running from 24 February 2017 to 1 April. Directed by Tom Attenborough, the cast features Douglas Booth (Howie), Tony Revolori (Solomon), Patsy Ferran (Diwata) and Charlotte Lucas (Teacher/Reporter).

=== Background ===
Karam said that he "specifically aimed to create characters who 'push through their pain... I think that’s what we do in our lives. [We] try to find some laughs and love.”

== Plot ==
The play, a dark comedy with music, features three misfit teenagers and their attempts to expose a drama teacher who preys on teenage boys. Solomon is a reporter for the school newspaper, Howie is a gay student who is solicited by the school's drama teacher on the Internet, and Diwata is an aspiring actress and singer.

The students decide to perform a musical version of Arthur Miller's The Crucible, combined with time travel and a young Abraham Lincoln, to shine a light on predatory teachers at the school.

== Reception ==
The New York Times reviewer wrote: "Stephen Karam’s dark comedy seems to be about a frumpy girl, a nerdy guy and an openly gay guy who band together to disclose the truth about a teacher who preys on his male students. But that topical plot is almost window dressing. The play’s real accomplishment is its picture of the borderland between late adolescence and adulthood, where grown-up ideas and ambition coexist with childish will and bravado." The Variety reviewer wrote: "...the conflicts explode in consistently intriguing ways. And Karam uses both the advantages and perils of cyberspace to make amusing, original points."

According to TCG, it was one of the most produced plays of 2009–2010.

== Film adaptation ==
The play has been adapted into a film, also titled Speech & Debate. The film is directed by Dan Harris, with the script by Karam. The cast stars Sarah Steele, Austin P. McKenzie, and Liam James (Solomon). The film has special appearances by Lin-Manuel Miranda, Kristin Chenoweth, and Darren Criss. The film was screened in select theatres and released on iTunes, and VOD on April 7, 2017.
