= Cathy Cade =

American photographer (1942–2024)

- Born: February 24, 1942; Honolulu, Hawaii, U.S.
- Died: November 16, 2024 (aged 82); Berkeley, California, U.S.
- Education: Carleton College; Tulane University (PhD)
- Occupations: Photographer, activist
- Children: 2

Catherine Elise Cade (February 24, 1942 – November 16, 2024), was an American photographer noted for her work in documentary photography, including photos about lesbian mothering. She was a feminist and lesbian activist from the early 1970s, inspired by the power of photography in the early 1960s as part of the Southern civil rights movement.

Cade lived in Berkeley, and worked with her archives at The Bancroft Library at the University of California at Berkeley. She was a member of the Bay Area Civil Rights Veterans and had memoir material at the Civil Rights Movement Archive. She was a member of Old Lesbians Organizing for Change.

== Early life and education ==
Cade was born in Honolulu, Hawaii on February 24, 1942 to parents William and Elise Cade (née Brown). She grew up in the South and the Midwest.

While attending Carleton College, Cade participated in the civil rights movement, in part through work with the Student Nonviolent Coordinating Committee (SNCC) while in an exchange program with Spelman College. She graduated from Carleton with a BA in sociology in 1963, after which she went to work for SNCC full-time and attended the March on Washington. In 1969, Cade received a PhD in sociology from Tulane University in New Orleans, continuing her activist work while pursuing her doctorate.

== Work ==
Cade was active in the civil rights, gay liberation, and women's liberation movements, tying her photography work to her activism. She came out as a lesbian and began work as a photographer in 1971 after almost a decade as a civil rights activist. Cade focused her photography on activism, political demonstrations, women in the workforce, and queer domestic life.

In late 2000, she started her business "Cathy Cade: Personal Histories, Photo Organizing and Photography". The University of California at Berkeley's Bancroft Library acquired Cade's full photo archive in 2012, its only full archive from a lesbian photographer as of 2019.

== Personal life and death ==
Cade had two sons, Carl and Leojo. She died from complications of dementia at her home in Berkeley, California, on November 16, 2024, at the age of 82.

== Publications ==
- A Lesbian Photo Album: The Lives of Seven Lesbian Feminists. (Oakland, Ca: Waterwomen Books, 1987).
- Woman Controlled Conception by Sarah and Mary Anonymous, drawings by Billie Mericle, copyright 1979 by Womanshare Books. Produced and distributed by UnionWAGE.

== Selected exhibitions ==
Cade was featured in the three person exhibit LESBIANS SEEING LESBIANS: Building Community in Early Feminist Photography at the Leslie-Lohman Museum of Art in 2011.

== Collections ==
Cade's work is held in permanent collections including:

- Leslie-Lohman Museum of Art
- Oakland Museum of California
- San Francisco History Center

== Awards and fellowships ==
2004—Pat Bond Memorial Old Dyke Award: Honoring Extraordinary Lesbians Over 60
