= Charles W. Socarides =

American psychiatrist

- Born: January 24, 1922; Brockton, Massachusetts, U.S.
- Died: December 25, 2005 (aged 83); New York City, New York, U.S.
- Education: Harvard University (BA); New York Medical College (MD); Columbia University
- Known for: National Association for Research and Therapy of Homosexuality (as the founder)
- Spouse: Claire Alford Socarides
- Children: 5, including Richard Socarides
- Scientific career
- Fields: Psychoanalysis, psychotherapy, human sexuality
- Workplaces: Columbia University Center for Psychoanalytic Training and Research; Columbia University; State University of New York Downstate Medical Center; Albert Einstein College of Medicine

Charles William Socarides (January 24, 1922 – December 25, 2005) was an American psychiatrist, psychoanalyst, physician, educator, and author. He focused much of his career on homosexuality, which he believed to be "a mental illness which has reached epidemiological proportions”, but one that could be altered. He helped found the National Association for Research & Therapy of Homosexuality (NARTH) in 1992 and worked extensively with the organization until his death.

== Early life and education ==
Socarides was born in Brockton, Massachusetts. In 1935, at the age of 13, after reading a biography of Sigmund Freud, Socarides decided to become a physician and psychoanalyst. He was educated at Harvard University, where he graduated from Harvard College in 1945. He then earned his Doctor of Medicine (M.D.) from New York Medical College in 1947 and studied at Columbia University, earning a certificate in psychoanalytic medicine from the Columbia University College of Physicians and Surgeons in 1952.

== Career ==
Socarides wrote or co-wrote numerous books and psychoanalytic articles. He appeared on news programs such as Dateline NBC, 60 Minutes and Larry King Live to discuss his work. He was a president of the National Association for Research & Therapy of Homosexuality (NARTH), which he helped to found in 1992. He was on the board of directors of the Margaret S. Mahler Psychiatric Research Foundation. He was a member of the International Advisory Committee, the Second Delphi International Psychoanalytic Symposium, held in Delphi, Greece, in 1988, the American Medical Association, the American Psychiatric Association, the Association for Psychoanalytic Medicine and the International Psychoanalytical Association. Socarides was a life member of the American Psychoanalytic Association, where he chaired a discussion group, and an affiliate member of the Royal Society of Medicine in London, United Kingdom.

Socarides was a practicing psychiatrist and psychoanalyst in New York City from 1954 until his death. He treated patients for homosexuality throughout his career. He reported that "about a third" of his patients became heterosexual after treatment. He taught Psychiatry at Columbia University and the State University of New York Downstate Medical Center, and was Clinical Professor of Psychiatry at the Albert Einstein College of Medicine, New York City, from 1978 to 1996. He lectured on his research findings in London at the Anna Freud Centre, the Portman Clinic, the Tavistock Clinic and before the British Psychoanalytical Society.

Much of Socarides' career was devoted to studying homosexuality. He has been grouped with Irving Bieber and Lionel Ovesey as the main representatives of the U.S. psychoanalytical current that has been active in promoting analytical methods to 'cure' homosexuality. Socarides postulated that homosexuality was a neurotic adaptation, and that it could be treated so as to turn gay people straight. He wrote that male homosexuality typically develops in the first two years of life, during the pre-Oedipal stage of a boy's personality formation. In his view, it is caused by a controlling mother who prevents her son from separating from her, and a weak or rejecting father who does not serve as a role model for his son or support his efforts to escape from the mother.

Socarides was vocally opposed to the American Psychiatric Association's decision to remove homosexuality from the Diagnostic and Statistical Manual of Mental Disorders. In 1992, Socarides founded NARTH with Joseph Nicolosi and Benjamin Kaufman. Socarides also spoke publicly about his opposition to the gay rights movement, which he believed would undermine societal gender roles and the family.

Socarides was the father of five children: a son, Richard Socarides, from his first marriage; a daughter, also from his first marriage; two children from his second marriage; and one from his fourth marriage, with Claire Alford Socarides. Richard, who is gay, was Bill Clinton's Senior Advisor for Public Liaison for gay and lesbian issues.

== Honor and Awards ==
- Distinguished Psychoanalyst, Association of Psychoanalytic Psychologists, British Health Service
- First Sigmund Freud Lectureship Award from the New York Center for Psychoanalytic Training, NYC
- 1987 Sigmund Freud Award given by the American Society of Psychoanalytic Physicians in recognition of distinguished service to psychiatry and psychoanalytic research.

== Works ==
- Socarides, Charles W. (1968). The Overt Homosexual. Jason Aronson, Inc. ISBN 0-87668-162-3.
- Socarides, Charles W. (1975). Beyond Sexual Freedom. New York Times/Quadrangle Books. ISBN 0-8129-0532-6.
- Socarides, Charles W.; & Kramer, Selma (1975). Work and Its Inhibitions: Psychoanalytic Essays. International Universities Press. ISBN 0-8236-6866-5.
- Socarides, Charles W. (1977). The World of Emotions: Clinical Studies of Affects and Their Expression. International Universities Press. ISBN 0-8236-6867-3.
- Socarides, Charles W.; & Karasu, Toksoz B. (1979). On Sexuality: Psychoanalytic Observations. International Universities Press. ISBN 0-8236-3857-X.
- Socarides, Charles W. (1988). Preoedipal Origin and Psychoanalytic Therapy of Sexual Perversions. International Universities Press. ISBN 0-8236-4287-9.
- Socarides, Charles W. (1989). Homosexuality: Psychoanalytic Therapy. Jason Aronson, Inc. ISBN 0-87668-814-8. First published in 1978 under the title Homosexuality.
- Volkan, Vamik D.; & Socarides, Charles W. (1990). The Homosexualities: Reality, Fantasy, and the Arts. International Universities Press. ISBN 0-8236-2347-5.
- Volkan, Vamik D.; & Socarides, Charles W. (1991). The Homosexualities and the Therapeutic Process. International Universities Press. ISBN 0-8236-2348-3.
- Socarides, Charles W. (1992). Sexual Politics and Scientific Logic: The Issue of Homosexuality. Association for Psychohistory. ASIN B0006RCH62.
- Socarides, Charles W. (1995). Homosexuality: A Freedom Too Far. A Psychoanalyst Answers 1000 Questions About Causes and Cure and the Impact of the Gay Rights Movement on American Society. Roberkai. ISBN 0-9646642-5-9.
- Socarides, Charles W.; & Freedman, Abraham (2002). Objects of Desire: The Sexual Deviations. International Universities Press. ISBN 0-8236-3731-X.
- Loeb, Loretta L.; & Socarides, Charles W. (2004). The Mind of the Paedophile: Psychoanalytic Perspectives. Karnac. ISBN 1-85575-970-5.

== See also ==
- Homosexuality and psychology
- Richard Socarides
