= Chaparral High School (Arizona) =

American public high school

Location
- 6935 East Gold Dust Avenue; Scottsdale, Arizona 85253-1484; United States; 33°34′37″N 111°55′56″W

Information
- Type: Public
- Established: 1972
- School district: Scottsdale Unified School District
- Principal: Joshua Pantier
- Staff: 89.50 (FTE)
- Grades: 9–12
- Enrollment: 1,909 (2023–2024)
- Student to teacher ratio: 21.33
- Colors: Red, gold, and black
- Mascot: Firebird
- Newspaper: Ashes
- Yearbook: Golden Embers
- Website: www.susd.org/Chaparral

Chaparral High School is a public high school located in Scottsdale, Arizona, in the United States. Its mascot is the firebird, and the school colors are black, red, and gold.

Chaparral opened in February 1973 with 800 students, comprising freshman, sophomore, and junior classes. The principal was Spencer Saunders Sr. The initial structures were built at a cost of $3.5 million. Chaparral's first graduates were the class of 1974.

The original campus was designed by Varney, Sexton, Sydnor Associates. TGK Construction Company built the campus with construction starting in 1971.

In 2008 many of the outdated buildings were demolished and replaced with new ones designed by Orcutt | Winslow Architects.

In 2014, Newsweek ranked Chaparral No. 22 among top American high schools, and No. 1 in Arizona.

== Student body and academics ==
Chaparral High School has consistently ranked in Newsweek's list of Best High Schools in America. In 2007, Chaparral High School was one of only 12 schools ranked in Arizona.

The high school holds the state record for having the most National Merit Scholars in one year (37 in 2014). Additionally, the school has also earned the record most in-state Presidential Scholars in Arizona, with 17 in 2003.

== Former Principals ==
Joshua Pantier (2022-Present)

Todd Dreifort (2018-2022)

Dr. Angela Chomokos (2017-2018)

Gayle Holland (2011-2017)

Mary Lou Mucino (2002-2011)

Dr. John Kreikard (1995-2002)

Kim Greenwalt (1993-1995)

John Paul Jones (1988-1993)

Evelyn Caskey (1983-1988)

Tom Smith (1980-1983)

Stuart Kammerman (1976-1980)

James Curlett (1972-1976)

== Notable alumni ==
=== Athletes and coaches ===
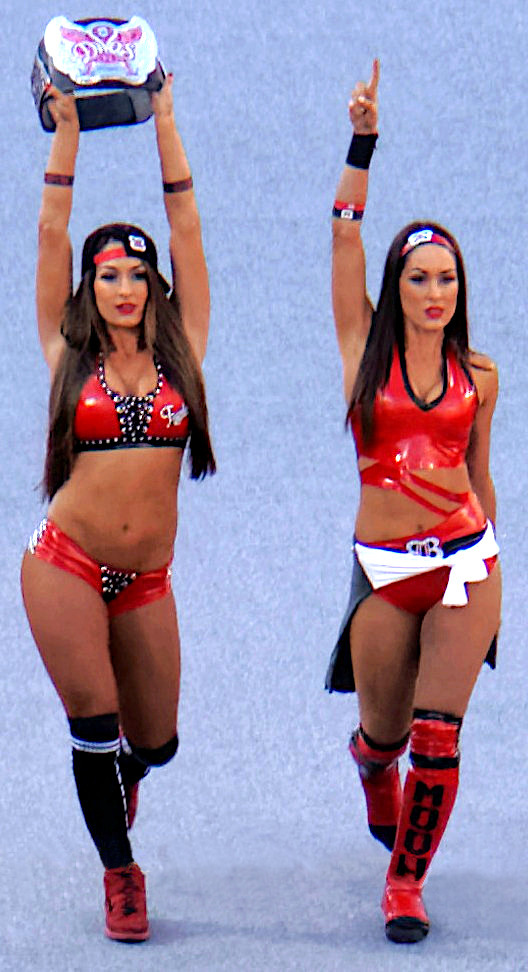
The Bella Twins

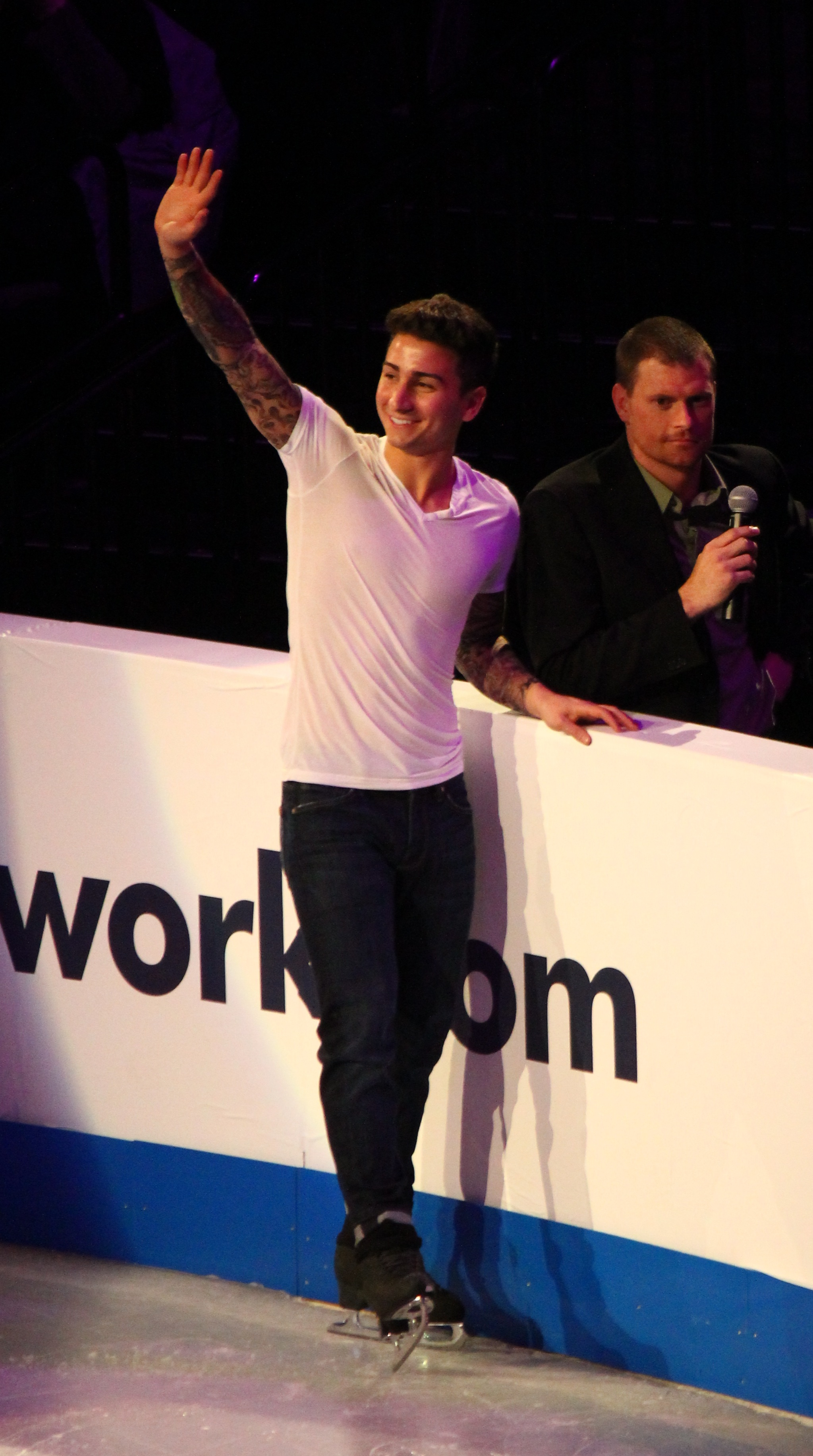
Max Aaron

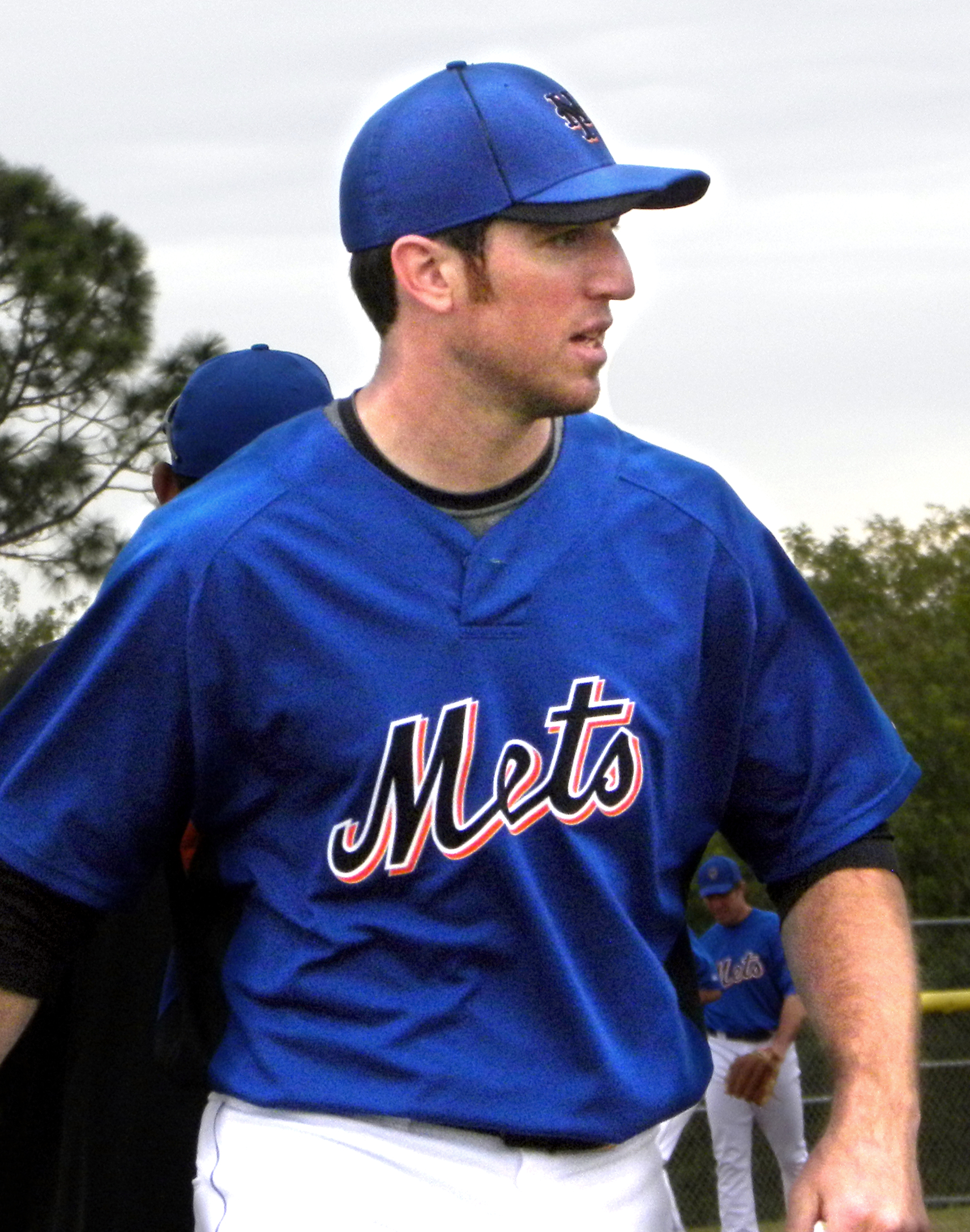
Ike Davis

- Max Aaron (born 1992), figure skater
- Chance Adams, baseball player for the Kansas City Royals
- Brian Bannister, baseball player for the Kansas City Royals
- Charles Brewer, baseball player for the Arizona Diamondbacks
- Darrell Bevell, football coach for the Miami Dolphins and former quarterback
- Daniel Coulombe, professional baseball player
- Dylan Cozens, baseball player for the Philadelphia Phillies
- Kenny Dillingham, head football coach for Arizona State Sun Devils
- Ike Davis (born 1987), baseball player for the New York Mets, Oakland Athletics
- Brianna and Nicole Garcia-Colace, professional twin wrestlers known in the WWE as the Bella Twins or Brie and Nikki Bella.
- Danielle Kamela, professional wrestler known in the WWE as Vanessa Borne
- Paul Konerko, former baseball player for the Chicago White Sox
- Taylor Lewan, professional football player for the Tennessee Titans
- Anthony Lucas, college football defensive end for the USC Trojans
- Darren Mougey, professional football player and executive
- Craig Roh, former football player for the Carolina Panthers
- Taylor Ruck, one of first two Olympic medalists born in the 21st century
- Wes Schweitzer (born 1993), football player for the New York Jets
- Lyle Sendlein, former football player for the Arizona Cardinals
- Kyle Williams, former football player for the San Francisco 49ers

=== Entertainment, Government and Media ===
- Dustin Lee Abraham, actor, producer and screenwriter
- Yassamin Ansari, Congresswoman for Arizona's Third Congressional District (2025 to present).
- Jason Bellini, journalist, lead news anchor for CBS News on Logo, former CNN correspondent
- Jarrett Bellini, former host of News of the Absurd for CNN.com, comedy writer, music journalist, social media influencer
- Alexandra Bracken, author
- Ashley Brewer, TV personality for ESPN
- Lauren Hildebrandt, pop singer, dancer, and actress
- Kongos, band
- Stephenie Meyer, author of Twilight book series
- Lymbyc Systym, band
- Jenny Mollen, actor and author
- Tyler Niknam, Twitch streamer
- Busy Philipps, actress
- Ray Herndon, country singer/songwriter and guitarist
- Daliah Wachs talk show host, media personality, author
