= List of bisexual people (A–F) =

The is a list of bisexual people, including famous people who identify as bisexual and deceased people who have been identified as bisexual.

== A ==
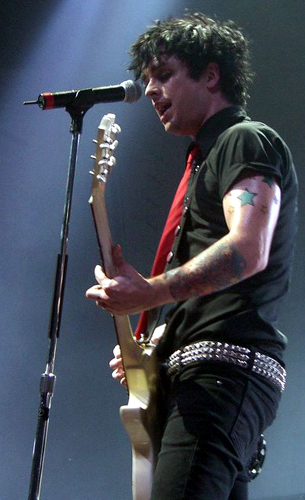
Musician Billie Joe Armstrong

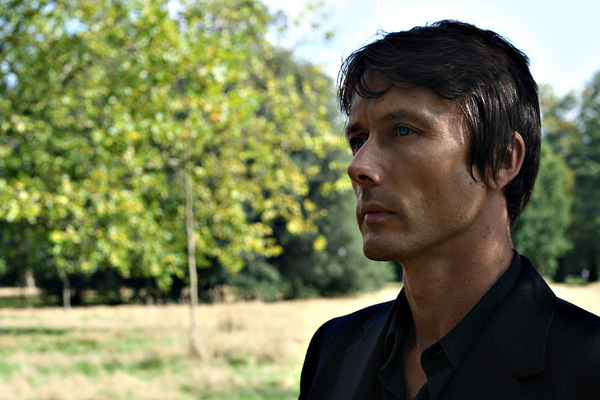
Singer Brett Anderson

Name	Dates	Nationality	Comments	Reference
Kathy Acker	1949–1997	American	Writer and feminist	
Rhammel Afflick	born 1994	British	Writer and activist	
Patience Agbabi	born 1965	British	Poet	
Asia Agcaoili	born 1977	Filipino	Actress, model, entrepreneur, television and radio host, and former columnist	
Henry Ainley	1879–1945	British	Actor	
Anna Akana	born 1989	American	Actress, comedian, filmmaker, musician, and YouTuber	
Desiree Akhavan	born 1984	American	Actress, film director, producer and screenwriter	
Zoë Akins	1886–1958	American	Playwright	
Summer Altice	born 1979	American	Model and actress	
Hans Christian Andersen	1805–1875	Danish	Writer; generally avoided actual sexual relations	
Brett Anderson	born 1967	British	Singer-songwriter, and former lead vocalist of Suede	
Nadine Angerer	born 1978	German	Footballer	
Ängie	born 1995	Swedish	Singer, songwriter, rapper	
Anitta	born 1993	Brazilian	Singer, songwriter, dancer and actress	
Chagmion Antoine	born 1982	American	Broadcast journalist	
Louis Aragon	1897–1982	French	Poet and novelist	
Penny Arcade	born 1950	American	Performance artist, playwright, aka Susana Ventura	
Billie Joe Armstrong	born 1972	American	Singer, songwriter, guitarist for Green Day	
François Arnaud	born 1985	Canadian	Actor	
Jake Arnott	born 1961	British	Novelist, came out as bisexual in his twenties	
Julie d'Aubigny	1670–1707	French	Swordswoman and opera singer (aka La Maupin)	
Aurora	born 1996	Norwegian	Singer, songwriter and record producer	

== B ==
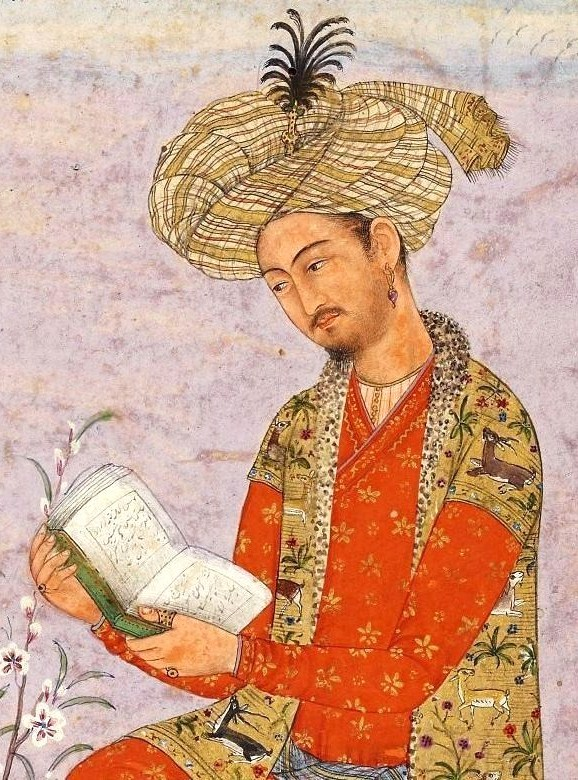
Mughal emperor Babur

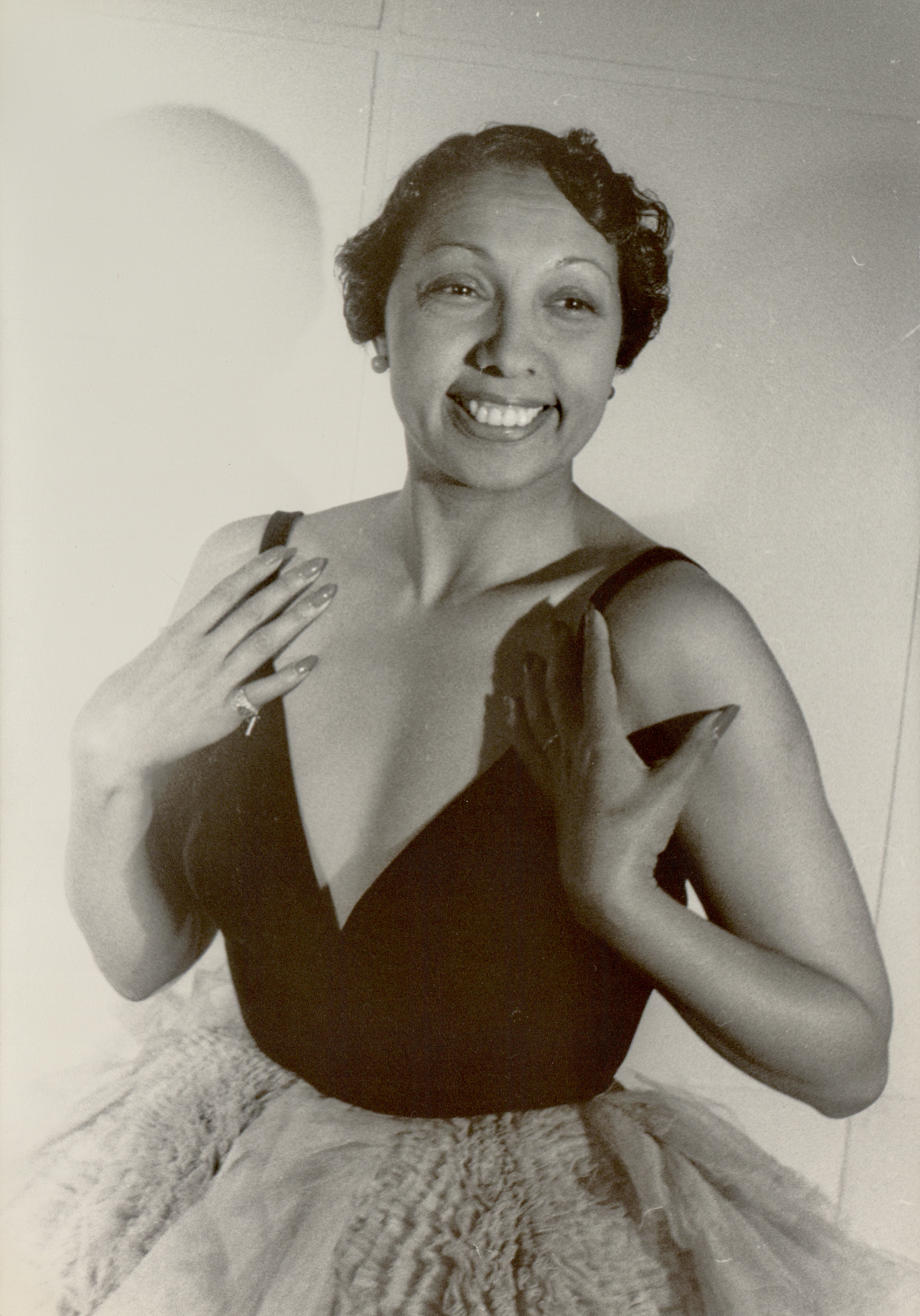
Entertainer Josephine Baker

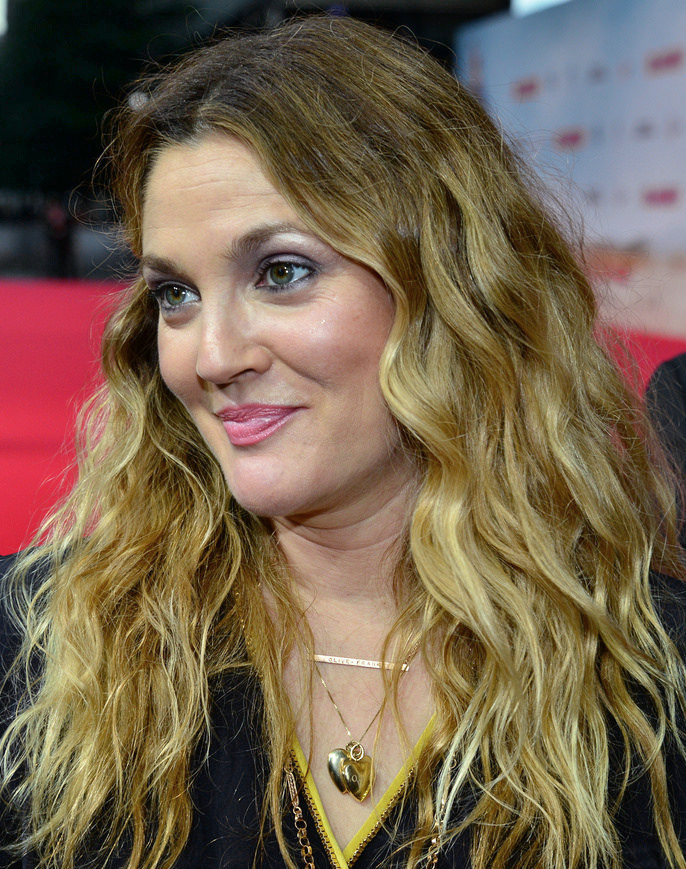
Actress Drew Barrymore

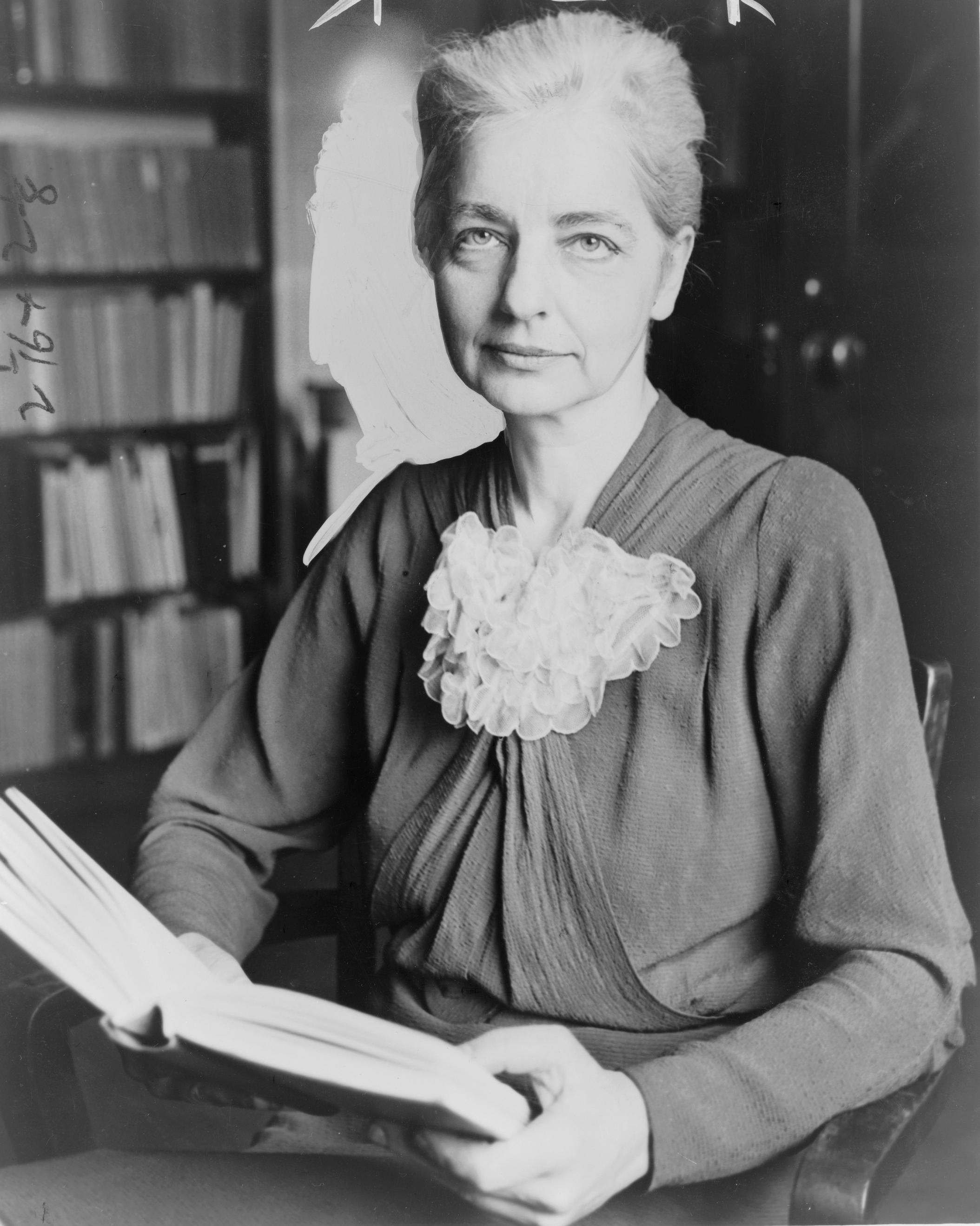
Anthropologist Ruth Benedict

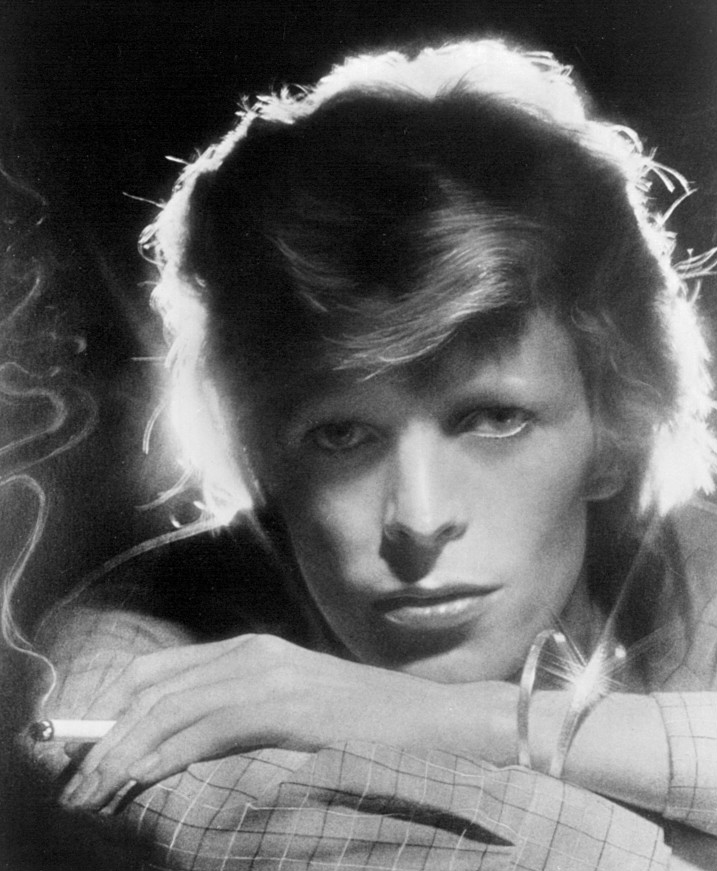
Musician David Bowie in 1975

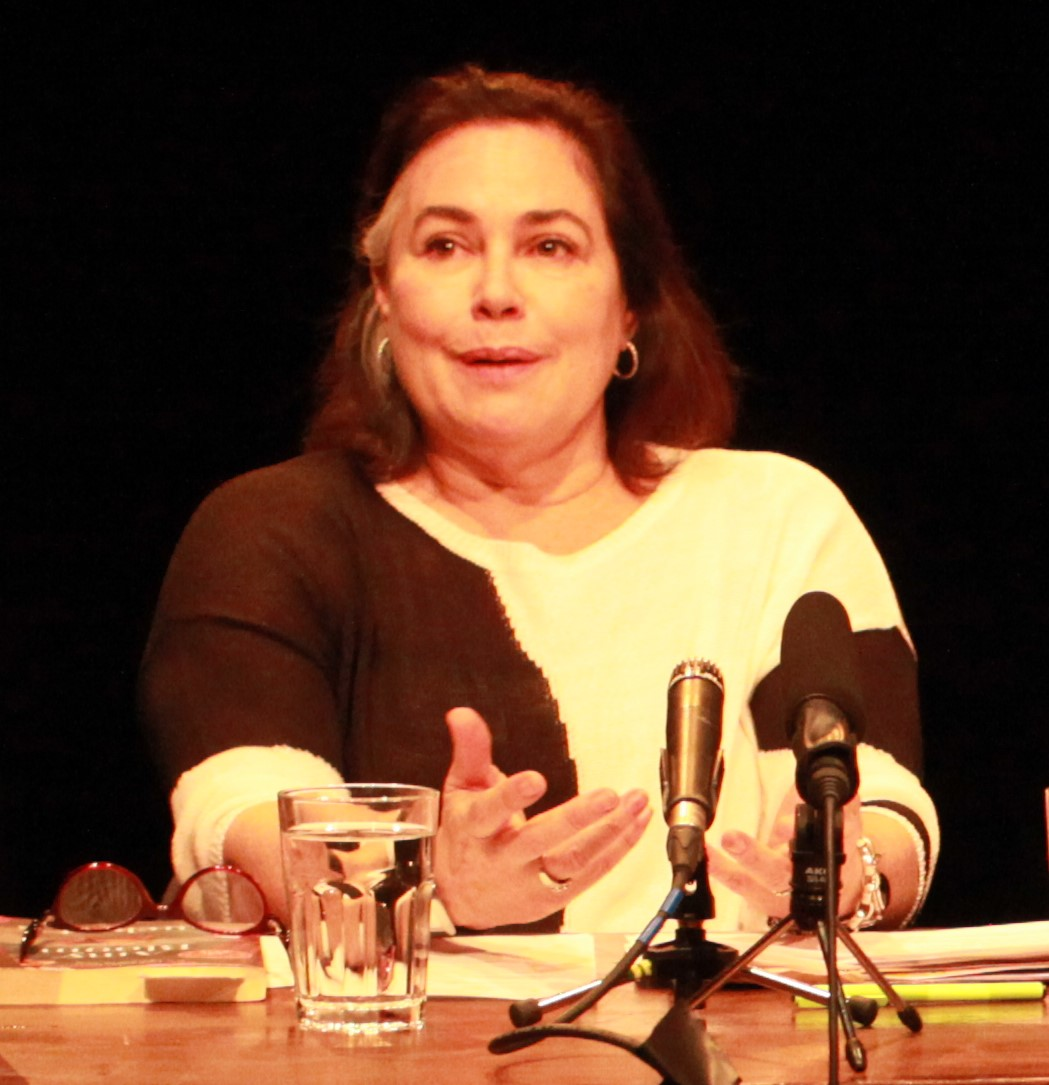
Writer and psychotherapist, Amy Bloom

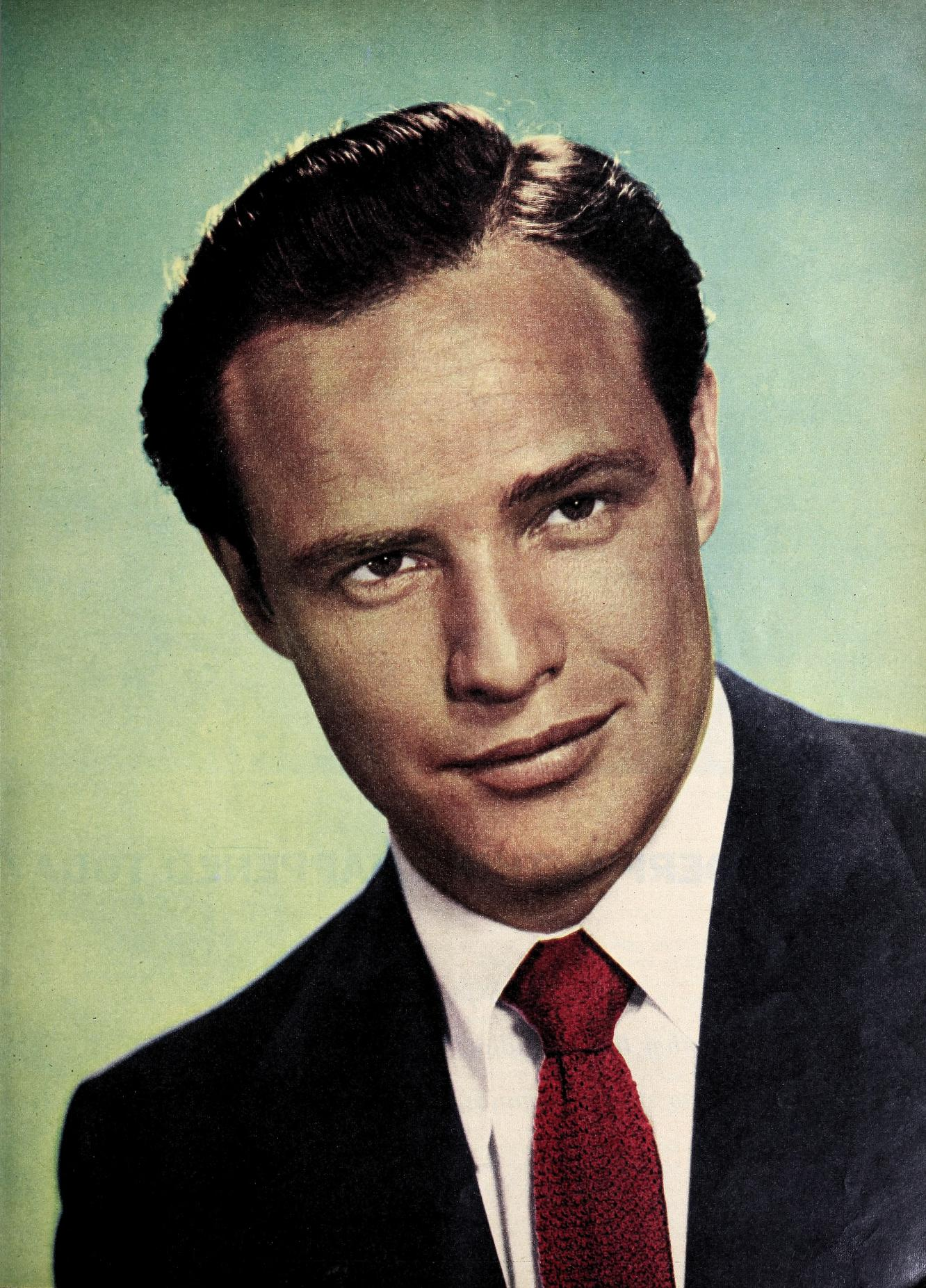
Actor Marlon Brando

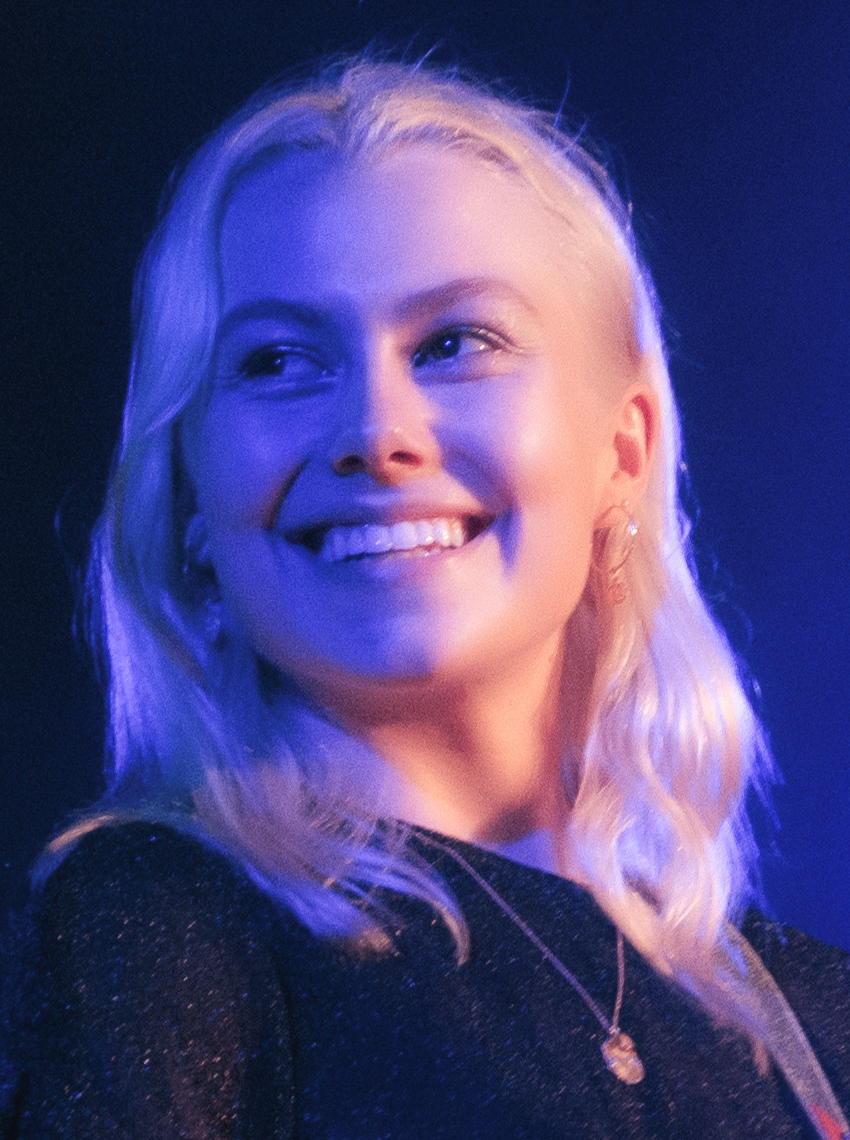
Singer-songwriter Phoebe Bridgers in 2018

Name	Dates	Nationality	Comments	Reference
Babur	1483–1530	Indian/Mughal	A Mughal emperor and the founder of the Mughal Empire in the Indian subcontinent	
Joan Baez	born 1941	American	Singer	
Alice Bag	born 1958	American	Singer with punk rock band Bags	
Josephine Baker	1906–1975	American	Entertainer and actress (French citizen from 1937)	
Marina Baker	born 1967	British	Writer and politician	
Canaan Banana	1936–2003	Zimbabwean	Politician, first president of Zimbabwe	
Tallulah Bankhead	1902–1968	American	Actress	
Azealia Banks	born 1991	American	Rapper and singer	
Alexander Bard	born 1961	Swedish	Musician	
Jean-Pierre Barda	born 1967	Swedish	Musician, author, actor	
Djuna Barnes	1892–1982	American	Writer, artist, illustrator and journalist	
Nessa Barrett	born 2002	American	Singer, songwriter	
Amanda Barrie	born 1935	British	Actress on Coronation Street, Cleo in Carry On Cleo	
Drew Barrymore	born 1975	American	Actress	
Jamie Barton	born 1981	American	Opera singer (mezzo-soprano)	
Megan Barton-Hanson	born 1994	English	Television personality and sex worker	
Jean-Michel Basquiat	1960–1988	American	Artist	
Jennifer Baumgardner	born 1970	American	Writer, journalist, filmmaker and lecturer	
Mark Bautista	born 1983	Filipino	Model and singer	
Jaime Bayly	born 1965	Peruvian	Writer and journalist	
Beabadoobee (Beatrice Kristi Ilejay Laus)	born 2000	Filipino	Singer and songwriter	
Stephanie Beatriz	born 1981	Argentine-American	Actress and model	
Bianca Beauchamp	born 1977	Canadian	Adult model	
Simone de Beauvoir	1908–1986	French	Philosopher	
María Becerra	born 2000	Argentine	Singer	
Julian Beck	1925–1985	American	Actor, director, poet, and painter	
Sybille Bedford	1911–2006	British	Writer	
Madison Beer	born 1999	American	Singer and songwriter	
Aphra Behn	1640–1689	British	Writer and spy	
Dario Bellezza	1944–1996	Italian	Poet and author	
Ruth Benedict	1887–1948	American	Anthropologist	
Brenda Benet	1945–1982	American	Actress; wife of Bill Bixby, lover of Tammy Bruce	
Jessica Benham	born 1990	American	Politician and disability rights activist	
Michael Bennett	1943–1987	American	Director, choreographer, and dancer	
Anita Berber	1899–1928	German	Dancer, actress, writer, and prostitute	
Helmut Berger	born 1944	Austrian	Actor	
Ruth Bernhard	1905–2006	German	Photographer	
Sandra Bernhard	born 1955	American	Comedian, singer, actress and author	
Sarah Bernhardt	1844–1923	French	Actress	
Leonard Bernstein	1918–1990	American	Composer and conductor	
John Betjeman	1906–1984	British	Poet laureate	
Magnus Betnér	born 1974	Swedish	Comedian	
Tobias Billström	born 1973	Swedish	Politician	
Björk	born 1965	Icelandic	Singer, songwriter, actress and activist	
Tori Black	born 1988	American	Pornographic actress and adult model	
Olivia Blake	born 1990	British	Politician	
Griselda Blanco	1943–2012	Colombian	Career criminal and drug trafficker	
Anthony Blond	1928–2008	British	Publisher and author	
Amy Bloom	born 1953	American	Writer	
Violet Blue	born ?	American	Writer, podcaster, sex educator, and sex columnist	
Julio Bocca	born 1967	Argentinian	Ballet dancer	
Rodolfo Bottino	1959–2011	Brazilian	Actor, cook and restaurateur	
Bernard Boursicot	born 1944	French	Diplomat; his story inspired M. Butterfly	
Crystal Bowersox	born 1987	American	Country singer, folk singer, Broadway actress, American Idol runner-up	
Angela Bowie	born 1950	American	Model, writer, musician, ex-wife of David Bowie	
David Bowie	1947–2016	British	Musician	
Jane Bowles	1917–1973	American	Writer; wife of Paul Bowles	
Paul Bowles	1910–1999	American	Composer and author; husband of Jane Bowles	
Adolf Brand	1874–1945	German	Writer and LGBT activist	
Marlon Brando	1924–2004	American	Actor	
Karan Brar	b. 1999	American	Actor	
Cait Brennan	born 1969	American	Singer-songwriter and screenwriter	
Jeremy Brett	1933–1995	British	Actor, famous as Sherlock Holmes	
Phoebe Bridgers	born 1994	American	Singer-songwriter	
Susie Bright	born 1958	American	Writer and broadcaster	
Joy Brook	born 1969	British	Actress, DC Kerry Holmes on The Bill	
Rupert Brooke	1887–1915	British	Poet	
Louise Brooks	1906–1985	American	Actress	
Romaine Brooks	1874–1970	American	Painter	
Brigid Brophy	1929–1995	British	Writer	
Kate Brown	born 1960	American	Politician, governor of Oregon	
Melanie Brown	born 1975	British	Singer with girl band Spice Girls, songwriter, actress, and television personality	
Coral Browne	1913–1991	Australian	Actress, wife of Vincent Price	
Carrie Brownstein	born 1974	American	Musician	
Gioia Bruno	born 1963	American	Musician	
Louise Bryant	1885–1936	American	Radical journalist, played by Diane Keaton in Reds	
Tylene Buck	born 1972	American	Pornographic actress and adult model; former professional wrestler and valet	
Ryan Buell	born 1982	American	Paranormal investigator, television personality	
Concha Buika	born 1972	Spanish	Singer	
Julie Burchill	born 1959	British	Writer	
Pete Burns	1959–2016	British	Singer-songwriter with Dead or Alive	
William S. Burroughs	1914–1997	American	Writer	
Saffron Burrows	born 1973	British	Actress and model	
Dorothy Bussy	1865–1960	British	Writer	
Robin Byrd	born 1957	American	Former pornographic actress, now a cable TV host	
Lord Byron	1788–1824	British	Nobleman, poet	

== C ==
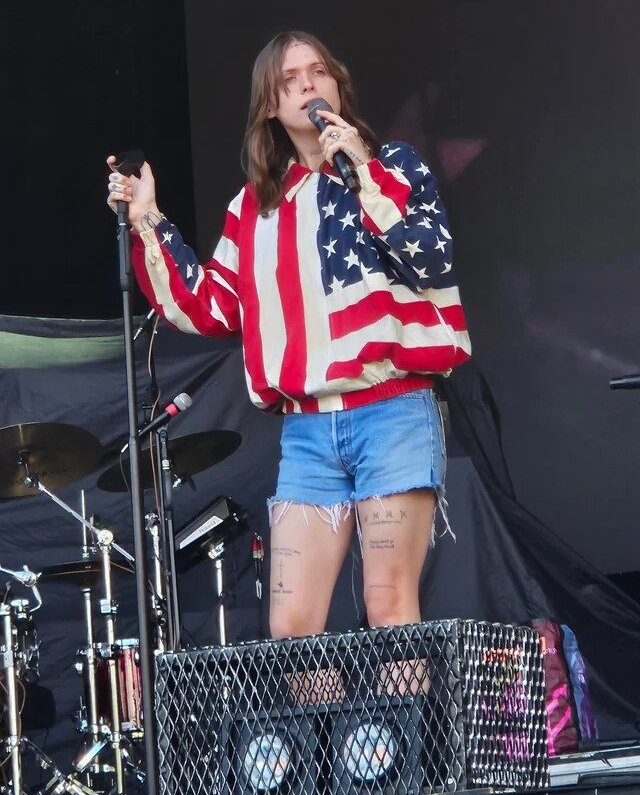
Singer Ethel Cain

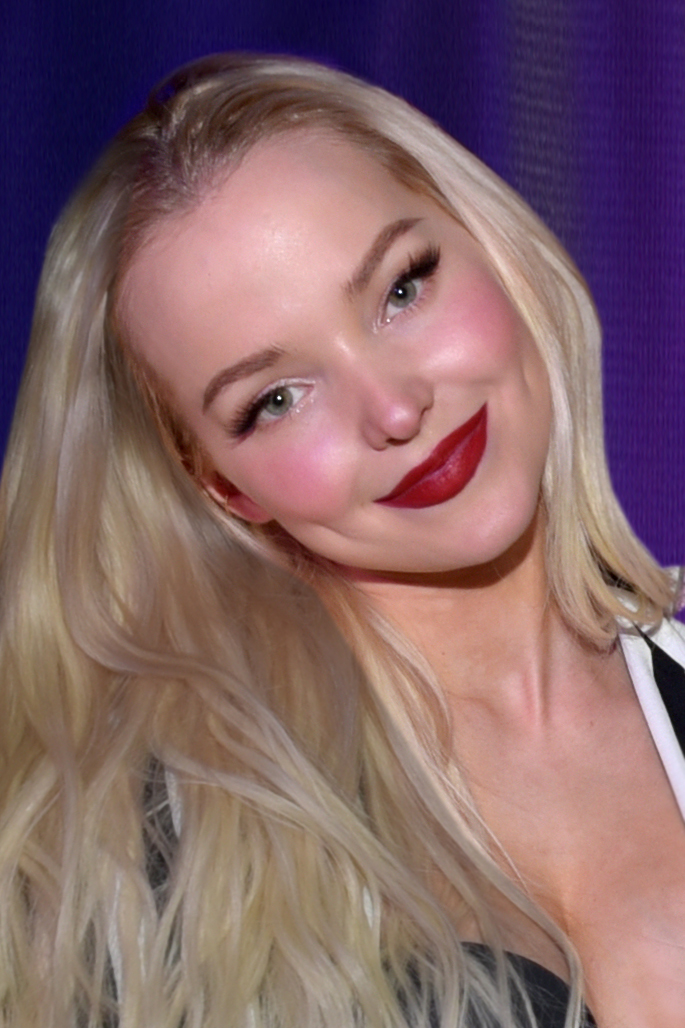
Actress and singer Dove Cameron

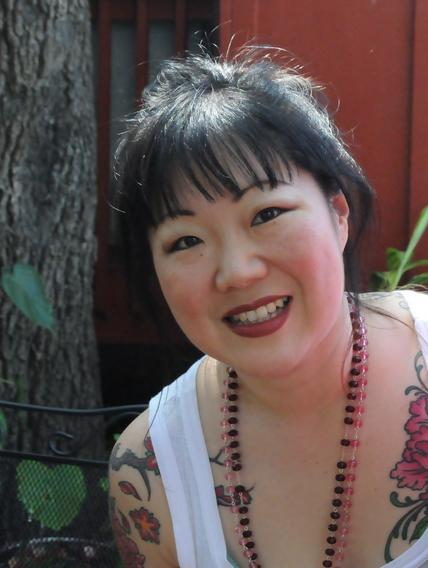
Comedian Margaret Cho

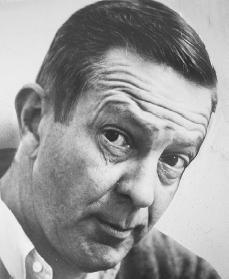
Writer John Cheever

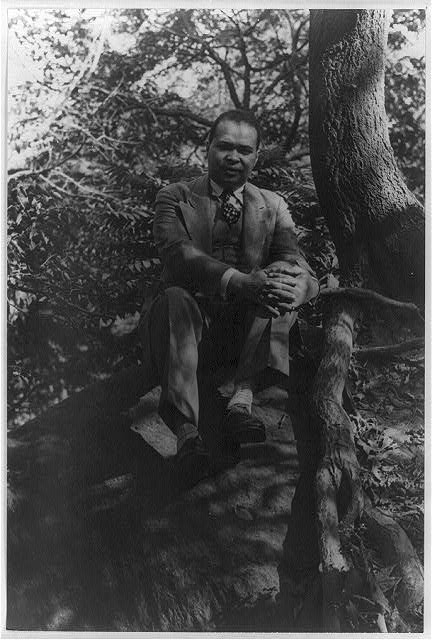
Poet Countee Cullen

Name	Dates	Nationality	Comments	Reference
Ethel Cain	born 1998	American	Singer	
Caligula	12 – 41CE	Roman	Emperor	
Dove Cameron	born 1996	American	Actress and singer	
Colin Campbell	1942–2001	Canadian	Artist	
Roy Campbell	1901–1957	South African	Poet and translator	
Daniele Capezzone	born 1972	Italian	Politician and journalist	
Gia Carangi	1960–1986	American	Model, played by Angelina Jolie in Gia	
Cardi B	born 1992	American	Rapper	
Vanessa Carlton	born 1980	American	Singer, musician, songwriter; "I am a proud bisexual woman."	
George Carman	1929–2001	British	Lawyer, leading barrister of the 1980s and 1990s	
Ana Carolina	born 1974	Brazilian	Musician; "I am Bi. So what?"	
Cameron Carpenter	born 1981	American	Organist	
Robert Carr, 1st Earl of Somerset	1587–1645	Scottish	Politician and lover of King James I of England	
Gail Carriger	born 1976	American	Author, archaeologist	
Dora Carrington	1893–1932	English	Artist	
Jim Carroll	1950–2009	American	Writer (The Basketball Diaries) and musician	
Aaron Carter	1987–2022	American	Singer	
Nell Carter	1948–2003	American	Singer and actress	
Giacomo Casanova	1725–1798	Italian	Traveller and writer	
Andie Case	born 1992	American	Singer, songwriter	
Neal Cassady	1926–1968	American	Beatnik and writer	
Jack Cassidy	1927–1976	American	Actor, father of David Cassidy	
Constantine P. Cavafy	1863–1933	Greek	Poet	
Cazuza	1958–1990	Brazilian	Composer and singer	
Benvenuto Cellini	1500–1571	Italian	Goldsmith, painter, soldier, autobiographer	
Alvilde Chaplin	1909–1994	British	Gardening and landscape expert, married to bisexual James Lees-Milne	
Crystal Chappell	born 1965	American	Actress; "I am equally attracted to men and women."	
Bruce Chatwin	1940–1989	English	Novelist and travel writer	
John Cheever	1912–1982	American	Writer	
Neneh Cherry	born 1964	Swedish	Musician and broadcaster	
Leslie Cheung	1956–2003	Hong Kong	Actor and musician	
Margaret Cho	born 1968	American	Comedian	
Greta Christina	born 1961	American	Author, blogger, speaker	
Hélène Cixous	born 1937	French	Writer and philosopher	
Clairo	born 1998	American	Singer and songwriter	
Dodie Clark	born 1995	British	Singer-songwriter, YouTube personality	
Montgomery Clift	1920–1966	American	Actor	
CMAT (Ciara Mary-Alice Thompson)	born 1996	Irish	Singer, songwriter, and musician	
Kurt Cobain	1967–1994	American	Artist, musician, and songwriter	
Cyril Collard	1957–1993	French	Author, filmmaker, composer, and actor	
Simon Collins	born 1976	English-Canadian	Musician, son of Phil Collins	
Kit Connor	born 2004	English	Actor	
Caroline Coon	born 1945	English	Artist, journalist and political activist	
Colleen Coover	born 1969	American	Artist	
Kate Copstick	born ?	Scottish	Television presenter, actress, writer and director	
Monique Covét	born 1976	Hungarian	Pornographic actress, adult model, and businesswoman	
Baron Gottfried von Cramm	1909–1976	German	Tennis player, twice French Open champion	
Darby Crash	1958–1980	American	Musician	
Auli’i Cravalho	born 2000	American	Actress, singer	
Joan Crawford	1905–1977	American	Actress	
Aleister Crowley	1875–1947	English	Occultist and hedonist	
Countee Cullen	1903–1946	American	Poet of the Harlem Renaissance	
Alan Cumming	born 1965	Scottish	Actor	
Cytherea	born 1981	American	Pornographic film actress, adult model, and businesswoman	

== D ==
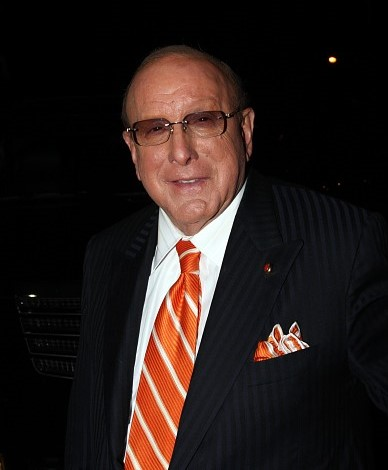
Music executive Clive Davis

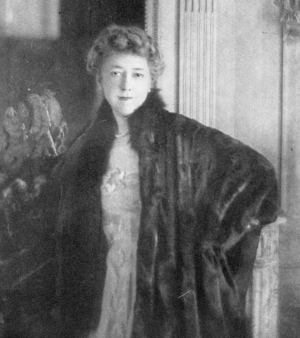
Interior decorator Elsie de Wolfe

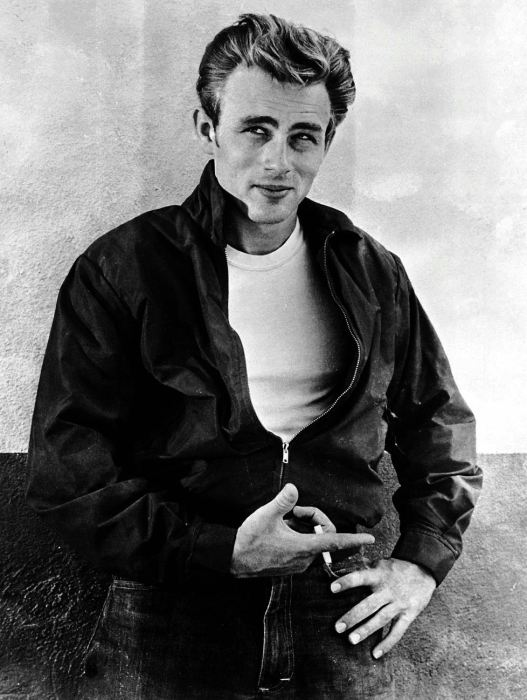
Actor James Dean

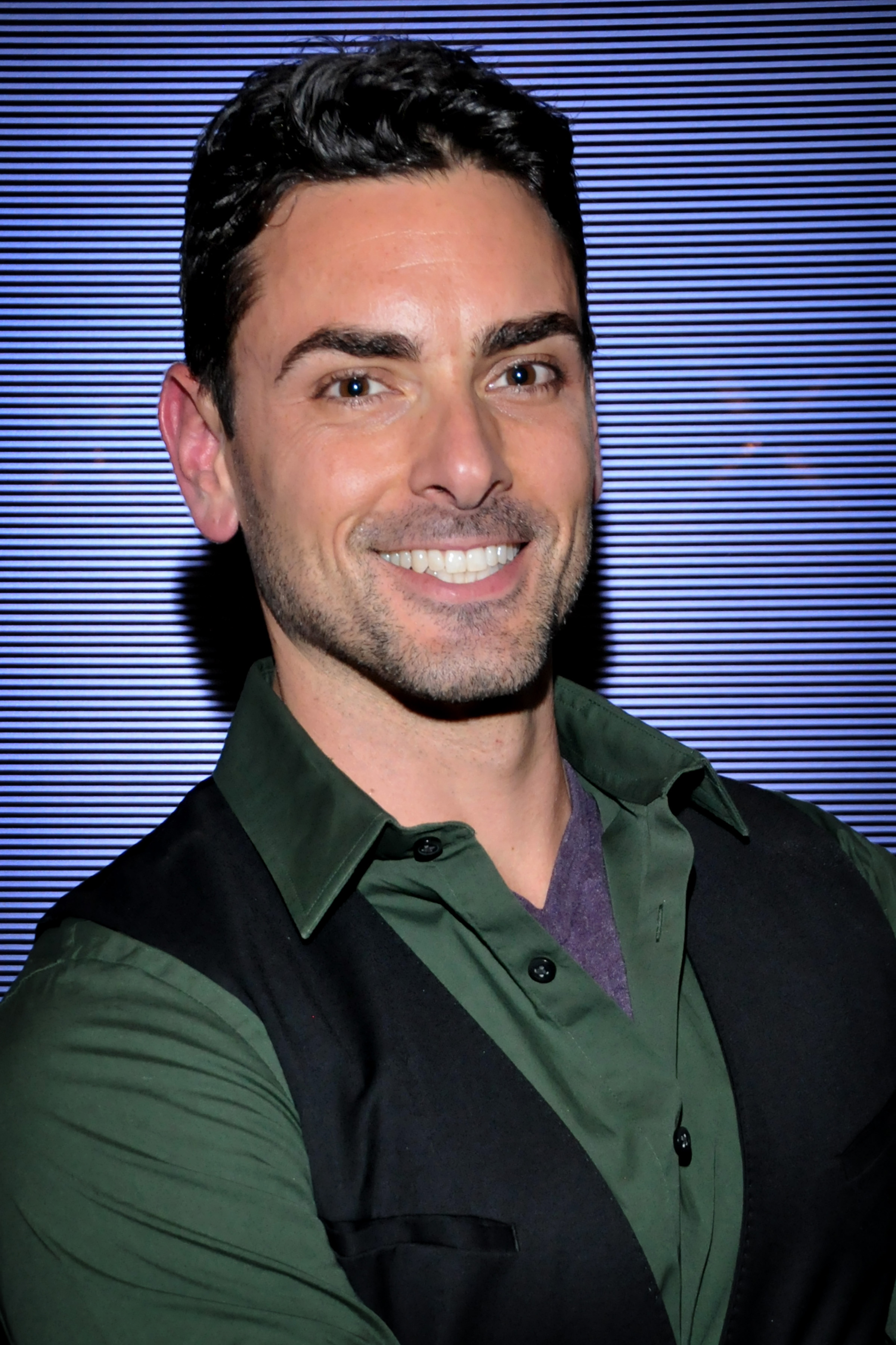
Pornographic actor Ryan Driller

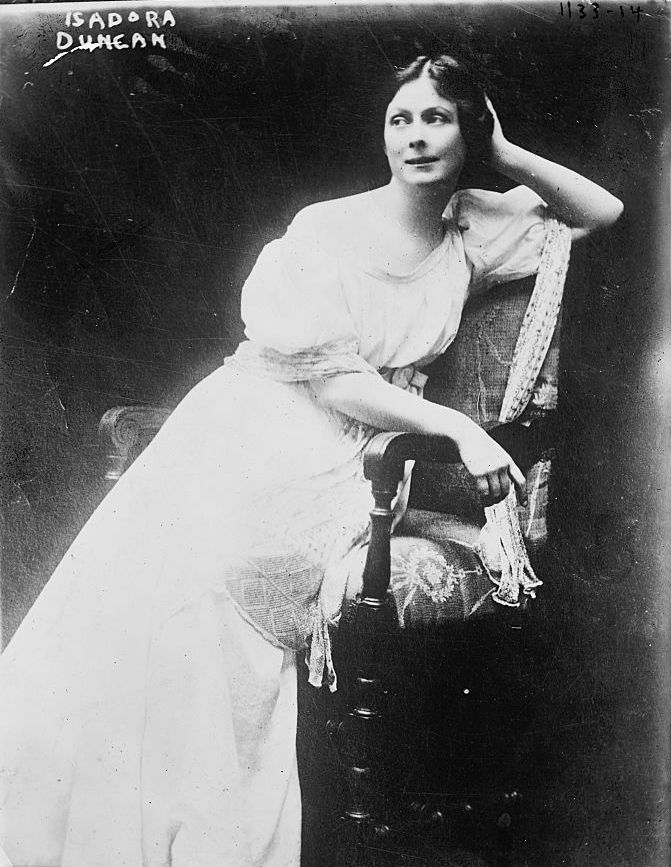
Dancer Isadora Duncan

Name	Dates	Nationality	Comments	Reference
Da Brat	born 1974	American	Rapper	
Stephen Daldry	born 1961	British	Theatre and film director	
Joe Dallesandro	born 1948	American	Actor	
Jacques Damala	1855–1889	Greek	Actor	
Dave Davies	born 1947	British	Musician with The Kinks	
Ron Davies	born 1946	British	Politician	
Brad Davis	1949–1991	American	Actor in Midnight Express	
Frank Marshall Davis	1905–1987	American	Journalist, poet, political, labor activist	
Sammy Davis Jr.	1925–1990	American	Entertainer	
Shane Dawson	born 1988	American	Internet personality	
Victoria De Angelis	born 2000	Italian	Bassist for Måneskin	
Klarisse de Guzman	born 1991	Filipino	Singer and songwriter; first runner-up of the first season of The Voice of the Philippines	
Oscar de la Renta	1932–2014	Dominican	Fashion designer	
Olga de Meyer	1871–1930	British	Socialite, rumored to be daughter of King Edward VII	
Elsie de Wolfe	1865–1950	American	Interior designer	
James Dean	1931–1955	American	Actor	
Bobby DeBarge	1956–1995	American	Lead vocalist of Switch	
Michelle Dee	born 1995	Filipino	Actress and beauty pageant titleholder who was crowned Miss Universe Philippines 2023	
Michelle Deighton	born 1986	American	Contestant on America's Next Top Model	
Jacques Demy	1931–1990	French	Film director	
Carla Denyer	Born 1985	British	Politician; self-describes as "bisexual or pansexual"	
Janet Devlin	born 1994	Northern Irish	Singer-songwriter	
Diane di Prima	1934–2020	American	Poet	
Andy Dick	born 1965	American	Actor and comedian	
Marlene Dietrich	1901–1992	American	German-born actress, singer	
Ani DiFranco	born 1970	American	Musician	
Rubén Doblas	born 1990	Spanish	Content creator	
Morgan Doctor	born ?	American	Musician	
Doechii	born 1998	American	Rapper	
Amanda Donohoe	born 1962	British	Actress	
Jude Ellison Sady Doyle	born 1982	American	Feminist writer	
Jessica Drake	born 1974	American	Pornographic actress, adult model, and erotic dancer	
Ryan Driller	born 1982	American	Pornographic actor, director and model	
Daphne du Maurier	1907–1989	British	Author	
Sir Michael Duff, 3rd Baronet	1907–1980	British	Society figure, married to bisexual Lady Caroline Paget	
Carol Ann Duffy	born 1955	British	Poet	
Isadora Duncan	1887–1927	American	Dancer	
Dominick Dunne	1925–2009	American	Writer	
Don Dunstan	1926–1999	Australian	Politician; premier of South Australia	
Eleonora Duse	1859–1924	Italian	Actress	
Rodrigo Duterte	born 1945	Philippino	Politician, former president of the Philippines	
Deborah Dyer	born 1967	British	Singer, aka Pea Narni aka Skin (of Skunk Anansie)	

== E ==
Name	Dates	Nationality	Comments	Reference
Laurie Toby Edison	born 1942	American	Photographer	
Hannah Einbinder	born 1995	American	Actress, comedian	
Billie Eilish	born 2001	American	Singer-songwriter	
Bret Easton Ellis	born 1964	American	Novelist, author of American Psycho and Lunar Park	
Edith Ellis	1861–1916	British	Writer, wife of sexologist Havelock Ellis	
William Empson	1904–1986	British	Literary critic (Seven Types of Ambiguity) and poet	
Eve Ensler	born 1953	American	Writer, author of The Vagina Monologues	
Cynthia Erivo	born 1987	English	Actress, singer	
Raúl Esparza	born 1970	Cuban American	Singer, actor	
Kenny Everett	1944–1995	British	DJ and comedian	

== F ==
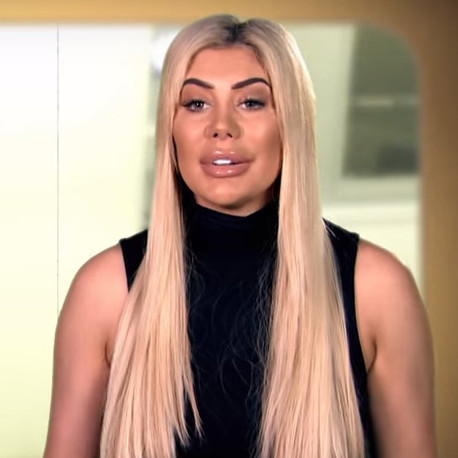
Television personality Chloe Ferry in 2018

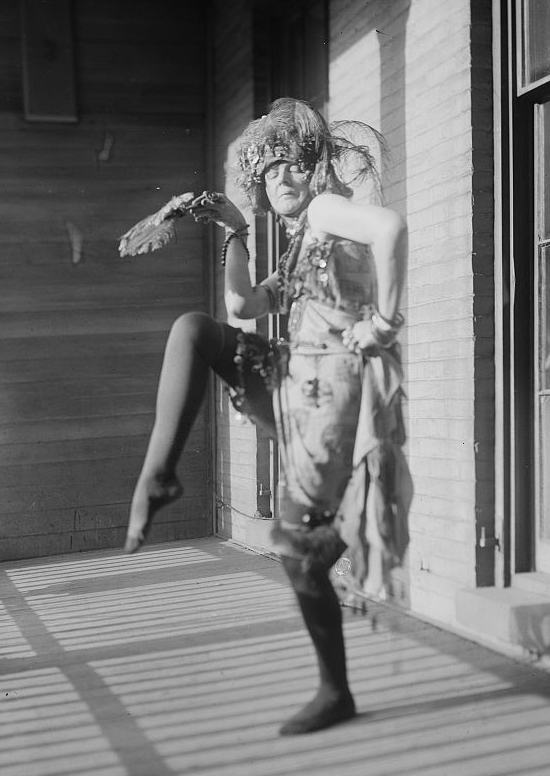
Dada artist Elsa von Freytag-Loringhoven

Name	Dates	Nationality	Comments	Reference
György Faludy	1910–2006	Hungarian	Poet, writer and translator	
Brenda Fassie	1964–2004	South African	Singer	
Frances Faye	1912–1991	American	Singer	
Peggy Fears	1903–1994	American	Actress; married A.C. Blumenthal three times, finally settled down with Tedi Thurman	
Fergie	born 1975	American	Singer with The Black Eyed Peas	
Chloe Ferry	born 1995	English	Television personality	
Annie Adams Fields	1834–1915	American	Writer	
Travis Fine	born 1968	American	Actor, writer, director, and producer	
Leonor Fini	1907–1996	Argentinian	Painter	
M. F. K. Fisher	1908–1992	American	Writer	
Elizabeth Gurley Flynn	1890–1964	American	Activist	
Althea Flynt	1953–1987	American	Wife of Larry Flynt	
Charles Henri Ford	1913–2002	American	Novelist, poet, filmmaker, photographer, and artist	
Xander Ford	born 1998	Filipino	Internet personality, singer, and actor	
Megan Fox	born 1986	American	Actress and model	
Kay Francis	1905–1968	American	Actress	
Ashley Frangipane	born 1994	American	Singer, songwriter and actress	
Anne Frank	1929–1945	Dutch-German	Diarist	
Pamela Frankau	1908–1967	British	Novelist	
Alan Freeman	1927–2006	Australian	Radio DJ	
Elsa von Freytag-Loringhoven	1874–1927	German	Dada artist and poet	
