= Lauren Hildebrandt =

American singer

- Born: December 19, 1982 (age 43); Scottsdale, Arizona, U.S.
- Origin: Los Angeles, California, U.S.
- Genres: Pop, dance, house
- Occupations: Musician, performer
- Instrument: Vocals
- Label: Red Wallet Records
- Website: www.laurenhildebrandt.com

Lauren Hildebrandt (born December 19, 1982) is an American pop singer from Scottsdale, Arizona. She is best known for her single "Boy Shorts", released in March 2009 alongside her album Not Really a Waitress. She spent her youth training as a singer, dancer, actress and gymnast and was a cheerleader for Chaparral High School. She went to Arizona State University and majored in dance but had an ambition for a mainstream pop career. About two years into her studies, she had a dancing accident and was forced to take a medical leave of absence, and during this period she moved to Los Angeles where she started recording dance music.

Her debut single, "Burnin' Out", reached #5 on the Billboard club play chart. Its video, directed by the Black Eyed Peas director Patricio Ginsela, helped establish her on the scene. She subsequently released the singles "Dance With You" and "My Life Again", both of which reached the top 20 of the Billboard club charts, and a more pop-oriented second album, My Life Again. Hildebrandt performed at venues including Honolulu's Pipeline Café and clubs in New York and Miami.

== Discography ==
- My Life Again (2007)
- Not Really a Waitress (2009)
