= Jason Bellini =

American journalist

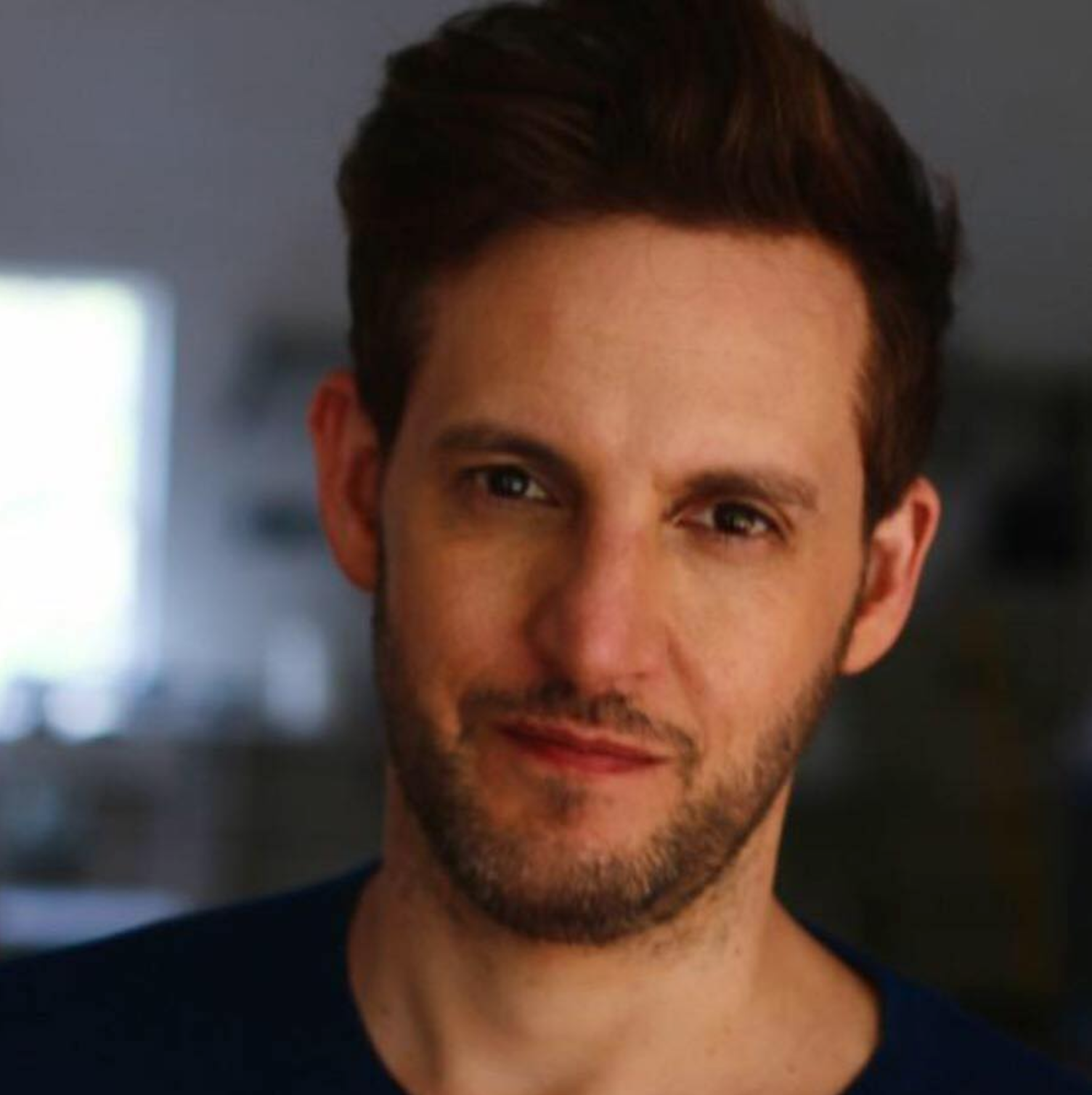
- Born: July 12, 1975 (age 51); Phoenix, Arizona, U.S.
- Education: Georgetown University (B.A.)
- Occupation: Journalist
- Employer: Newsy
- Relatives: Jarrett Bellini (brother)

Jason Bellini (born July 12, 1975) is an American journalist. He currently works at Scripps News. Bellini was a CNN correspondent from 1998 to 2005. He was a correspondent for The Wall Street Journal from 2012 to 2021.

== Early life ==
Bellini and his brother, Jarrett Bellini, were born and raised in Phoenix, Arizona. In 1992, Bellini became a U.S. Senate Page in Washington, D.C. The next year, Bellini graduated from Chaparral High School in Scottsdale, Arizona, where he worked on the school newspaper and became an Eagle Scout. In 1997, Bellini earned a bachelor's degree in history from Georgetown University.

== Professional career ==
In 1998, Bellini began his career with CNN as a production assistant and contributor to a news program for middle school and high school students. He also served as a field producer for CNN International, covering the NATO airstrikes against Serbian forces in Kosovo. One of his Kosovo stories achieved Medalist Status in the 1999 New York Festival Awards.

In 2000, Bellini worked for MTV where he served as part of that network's "street team" for MTV's Choose or Lose election coverage that followed the presidential candidates on the campaign trail during Election 2000. He was also a freelance writer for Washingtonpost.com and Channel One News. In 2001 Bellini spent months in New York City covering the aftermath of the September 11 attacks as the crisis evolved into an international war on terrorism. He later traveled to Central Asia to report on the story from Afghanistan. He also covered the Kashmir conflict from India. Bellini received a gold medal from the New York Festivals for "Jason's Journal: The Holy Land", a program he produced on the Israeli–Palestinian conflict. In 2003, Bellini reported as one of CNN's 18 embedded journalists during Operation Iraqi Freedom. He reported, often from the front lines, from his position with the U.S. Marines. In February 2003, Bellini was part of the team of CNN correspondents and anchors that covered the breaking news story of the Space Shuttle Columbia tragedy.

In 2005, Bellini became the lead news anchor for CBS News on Logo. Until August 2008 was the lead news anchor for CBS News on Logo. He received the 2006 "Journalist of the Year" award from the National Lesbian and Gay Journalists Association (NLGJA). In 2008, he was based in Singapore as a correspondent for Bloomberg TV. From 2009 to 2010: Bellini freelanced for The Daily Beast and The Wall Street Journal. In 2012, he produced a CNBC documentary, UPS/FedEx: Inside the Package Wars.

In 2012, Bellini became a senior producer and reporter at The Wall Street Journal. From 2013 to 2014, Bellini was a frequent guest on FOX NEWS' On the Record w/ Greta Van Susteren. In 2017, Bellini began hosting and producing a WSJ video series called "Moving Upstream."

In 2021, Bellini moved to Newsy, now known as Scripps News.

== Personal life ==
He is openly gay. Bellini is the older brother of Jarrett Bellini, a writer and journalist. Jason currently lives in Washington, DC.
