= Ashley Brewer =

American sports anchor

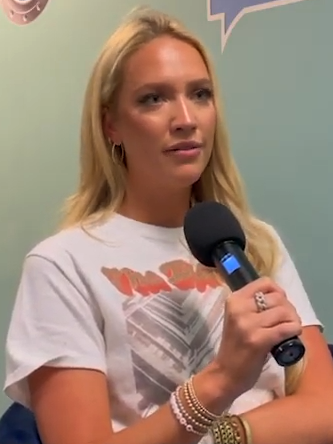
- Brewer in 2021
- Born: December 13, 1991 (age 34); Phoenix, Arizona, U.S.
- Education: University of Southern California
- Occupation: Sports journalist
- Years active: 2014–present

Ashley Brewer (born December 13, 1991) is best known for being a sports anchor/reporter for ESPN, a sports channel in the United States. She was hired to be one of the hosts of The Replay on Quibi and a part of the rotation of SportsCenter. In 2021, she became a co-host on SportsNation on ESPN+.

== Early life and education ==
Brewer was born and raised in Phoenix, Arizona. She went to Chaparral High School in Phoenix, where she was a 12-time prep All-American as a swimmer and the 2009 Arizona 4A state champion in the 100m backstroke. She helped Chaparral to a pair of state titles and was named her school's 2010 Female Athlete of the Year.

Brewer spent her first two years swimming for the University of Texas before transferring to the University of Southern California, where she graduated in 2014. During her time in Texas, she competed in the 2012 US Olympics trials for the 100m backstroke. She finished tied at 83rd.

== Career ==
After graduating from USC, Brewer became a college football sideline reporter for Cox 7 Arizona. She then became the weekend sports anchor at KGUN-TV in Tucson, Arizona. She was the weekend sports anchor and reporter at KABC-TV in Los Angeles, where she started as an intern in college. She was hired by ESPN in 2020. She made her SportsCenter debut on September 28, 2020. She also has worked on pre- and post-game shows and co-hosted ESPN Radio shows. Before joining ESPN, she was a part of the broadcast team on The Bachelor Winter Games show on ABC. Her duties included covering MMA and being a presenter for the 2022 NHL Awards.

On August 17, 2021, ESPN transferred Brewer back to Los Angeles, where she co-anchored the 1:00 a.m. ET (10:00 p.m. PT) edition of SportsCenter.

On June 30, 2023, Brewer was laid off by ESPN in a round of cost cuts of its public-facing commentators.

== Personal life ==
Brewer's oldest brother Charles was a right-handed pitcher for the Arizona Diamondbacks. Her brother Chase played baseball at UCLA and her younger brother Connor is a former quarterback for the University of Virginia. Her younger sister Abby played beach volleyball at USC. Ashley's mother Deborah Pyburn Brewer was a news anchor for the CBS station in Phoenix for almost ten years. In July 2023, Ashley Brewer married NBA player Frank Kaminsky. They have one son together. She is a Christian.
