= Charles Brewer (baseball) =

American baseball pitcher (born 1988)

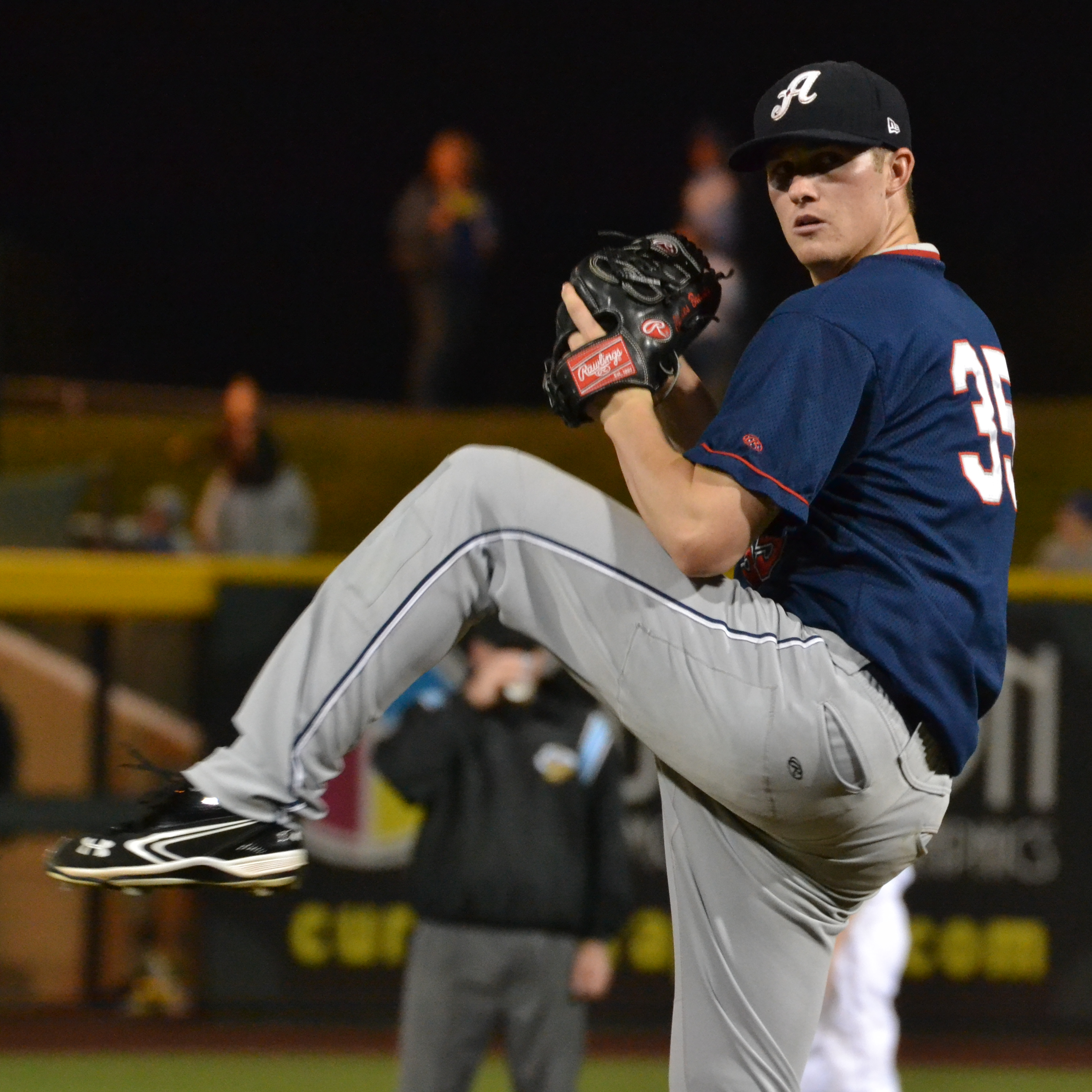
- Brewer pitching for the Reno Aces in 2012
- Pitcher
- Born: April 7, 1988 (age 38); Paradise Valley, Arizona, U.S.
- Batted: Right Threw: Right

MLB debut
- June 10, 2013, for the Arizona Diamondbacks

Last MLB appearance
- July 8, 2013, for the Arizona Diamondbacks

MLB statistics
- Win–loss record: 0–0
- Earned run average: 3.00
- Strikeouts: 5
- Stats at Baseball Reference

Teams
- Arizona Diamondbacks (2013)

Charles Robert Brewer (born April 7, 1988) is an American former professional baseball pitcher who played in Major League Baseball (MLB) for the Arizona Diamondbacks in 2013.

== Career ==
=== Amateur ===
Brewer attended the University of California, Los Angeles (UCLA), where he played college baseball for the UCLA Bruins baseball team. In 2007 and 2008, he played collegiate summer baseball with the Chatham A's of the Cape Cod Baseball League.

=== Arizona Diamondbacks ===
Brewer was drafted by the Arizona Diamondbacks in the 12th round, with the 366th overall selection, of the 2009 Major League Baseball draft. He made his professional debut with the rookie–level Missoula Osprey. Brewer split 2010 between the Single–A South Bend Silver Hawks and High–A Visalia Rawhide, accumulating an 11–8 record and 2.45 ERA with 153 strikeouts across 150 2/3 innings pitched. He spent the 2011 campaign with the Double–A Mobile BayBears, also missing time due to a hand injury. In 11 starts for Mobile, Brewer worked to a 5–1 record and 2.58 ERA with 48 strikeouts over 52 1/3 innings of work.

After beginning the 2012 campaign with Double–A Mobile, Brewer was quickly promoted to the Triple–A Reno Aces. In 24 starts for Reno, he logged an 11–7 record and 5.99 ERA with 104 strikeouts across 133 2/3 innings pitched. On November 19, 2012, the Diamondbacks added Brewer to their 40-man roster to protect him from the Rule 5 draft. He made his MLB debut on June 10, 2013. In 4 games during his rookie campaign, Brewer posted a 3.00 ERA with 5 strikeouts across 6 innings pitched.

Brewer split the 2014 campaign between Double–A Mobile and Triple–A Reno, compiling an 11–12 record and 4.46 ERA with 138 strikeouts over 29 total starts. On November 20, 2014, Brewer was designated for assignment by the Diamondbacks.

=== Cleveland Indians ===
On November 22, 2014, the Diamondbacks traded Brewer to the Cleveland Indians in exchange for cash considerations. He made 5 starts split between the rookie–level Arizona League Indians and Double–A Akron RubberDucks, registering a 2.08 ERA with 14 strikeouts across 17 1/3 innings of work. Brewer was released by the Indians organization on April 12, 2015.

=== Arizona Diamondbacks (second stint) ===
On February 10, 2016, Brewer signed a minor league contract with the Seattle Mariners organization. He was released prior to the start of the season on March 31.

On April 28, 2016, Brewer signed a minor league contract to return to the Arizona Diamondbacks organization. He made 3 appearances (2 starts) for the Double–A Mobile BayBears, logging a 1.04 ERA with 8 strikeouts over 8 2/3 innings pitched. Brewer elected free agency following the season on November 7.

=== Bridgeport Bluefish ===
On April 4, 2017, Brewer signed with the Bridgeport Bluefish of the Atlantic League of Professional Baseball.

On November 1, 2017, Brewer was drafted by the Southern Maryland Blue Crabs in the Bridgeport Bluefish dispersal draft. On January 9, 2018, Brewer was traded to the Sugar Land Skeeters where he finished his playing career.

== Personal life ==
He is the older brother of ESPN reporter Ashley Brewer.
