= Jarrett Bellini =

American writer and journalist

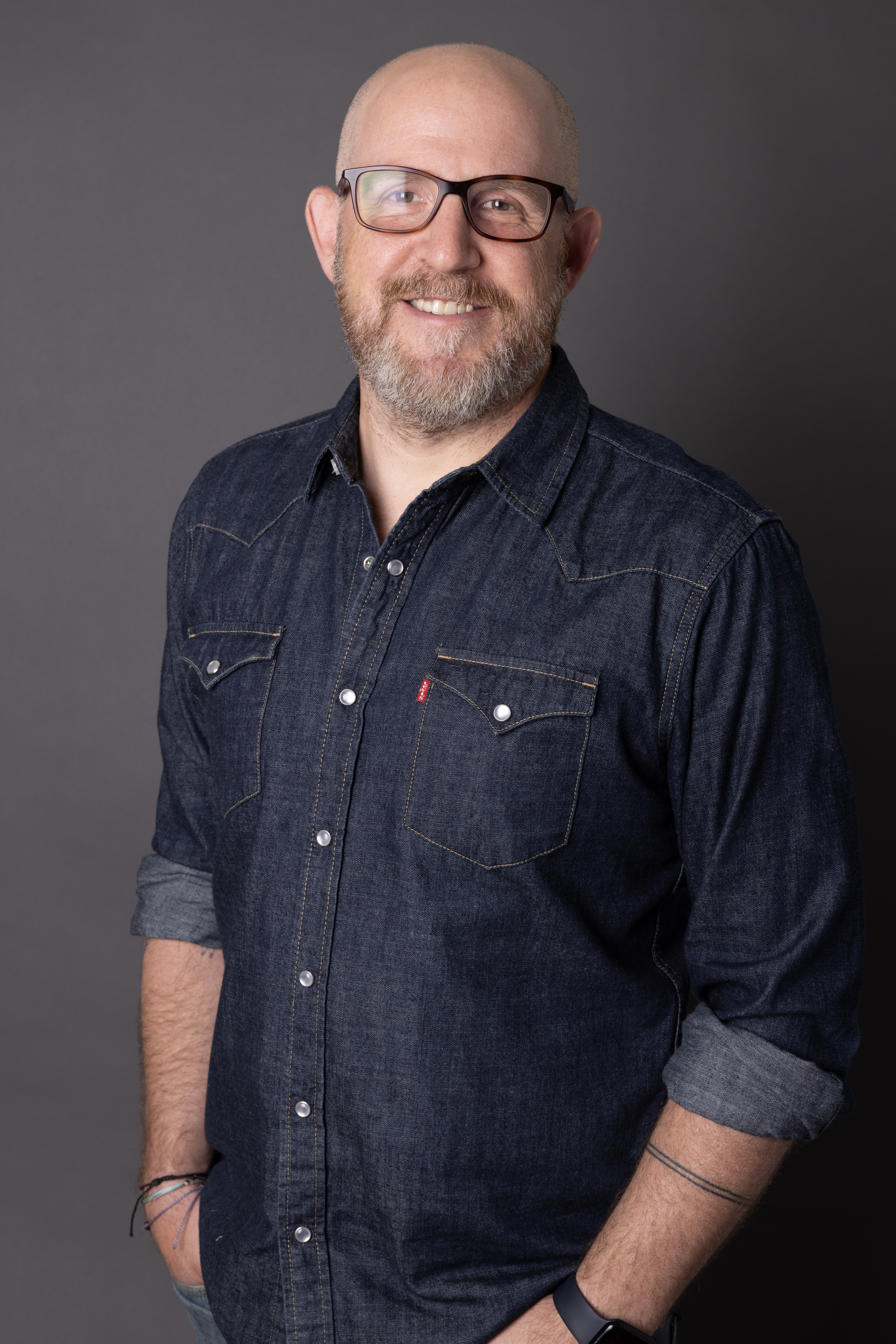
- Born: Jarrett Todd Bellini; October 3, 1978 (age 47); Phoenix, Arizona, U.S.
- Education: American University (BA)
- Occupations: Journalist; Writer
- Years active: 2004–present
- Relatives: Jason Bellini (brother)
- Website: www.jarrettbellini.com

Jarrett Bellini (born October 3, 1978) is an American writer and journalist.

== Career ==
In January 2004, Bellini joined CNN in Atlanta, and in June 2006 began writing and hosting a video podcast called The Gryst on CNN.Com. On July 26, 2007, after 57 episodes, The Gryst officially became News of the Absurd. In April 2009, Bellini began hosting a regular Daily Distraction segment for CNN.com LIVE, sharing interesting and offbeat web videos. Both News of the Absurd and Daily Distraction aired on CNN.com until November 2009.

Starting in June 2012, Bellini began writing a weekly column for CNN Digital called "Apparently This Matters" where he examines "trending topics in social media and random items of interest on the interwebs."

In December 2014, Bellini joined CNBC.

In November 2015, he launched an "Apparently This Matters" interview series on YouTube.

== Personal ==
Bellini was born and raised in Phoenix, Arizona, and is the younger brother of Wall Street Journal correspondent Jason Bellini. He graduated in 2001 from American University. Bellini is a bass guitarist, and has played in the past with the former local Atlanta band Animal & the Evolvers. He is of Italian and Jewish descent.
