= Chagmion Antoine =

American broadcast journalist

- Born: April 21, 1982 (age 44)
- Education: Alfred University
- Occupation: Journalist
- Known for: CBS News

Chagmion Antoine (born April 21, 1982) is an American broadcast journalist, best known for her work at CBS News.

== Career ==
Antoine graduated from Alfred University in 2004.

Hired by CBS in 2005, she has worked exclusively as an anchor/general assignment reporter for CBS News on Logo, a division of CBS News that provides programming for Logo, Viacom's 24-hour gay network. Chagmion Antoine worked with Logo as an intern while attending the National Gay and Lesbian Journalist Association.

Antoine is also known for her stint as the host of Logo's weekly online talkshow She Said What. The show is featured on the website AfterEllen.com and has been described a lesbian version of The View. Antoine is joined by co-hosts Staceyann Chin, Lauren Blitzer, and the site's creator Sarah Warn.

Antoine is the first openly bisexual newscaster to be featured on a major news program. In the December 2008 issue of Curve magazine, Kristin A. Smith wrote, "As a bisexual woman of color on an all-gay news network, Antoine is paving new ground in the business."

Chagmion works as a guest blogger for a project called Women Under Siege, which deals with media coverage of sexual violence and conflict.

== Other media appearances ==
- Antoine is included in GO! NYC magazine's 2007 "100 Women We Love" issue.
- Curve magazine's December 2008 issue features a full-page article on her titled, "Top Ten Reasons We Love Chagmion Antoine".
- Cast in films such as Person Of Interest, and Invasion. Along with television shows House of Cards, and Madam Secretary.
