= 365gay News =

American LGBTQ television news show

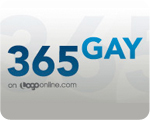
365gay News at 365gaynews.com logo

365gay News (formerly CBS News on Logo) is the umbrella title of gay-themed news programming airing on the Logo television network. The programming was produced in partnership with CBS as a result of the former ownership of both networks by Viacom. It debuted in June 2005, when the channel began broadcasting and was shut down on September 30, 2011.

Initially, news items were presented as short segments between scheduled programs. Occasionally the channel would air full half-hour specials on stories of interest to the LGBT community, such as the Gay Games, yearly gay pride events, the October 2006 ruling in the same-sex marriage case in New Jersey, Lewis v. Harris, and the issues facing gay voters in the 2006 mid-term elections.

== History ==
In late 2007 CBS News on Logo went from broadcasting segments between scheduled programming to a weekly half-hour format. New programs were broadcast each Monday and repeated through the week.

Jason Bellini was the lead anchor for CBS News on Logo until 2008. Other correspondents included Itay Hod and Chagmion Antoine. The Executive Producer until 2008 was Court Passant. The CBS News Up to the Minute set was utilized for the broadcast of the program.

Beginning in January 2007, a news update podcast became available for download through the iTunes Store.

In 2008, both Jason Bellini and Court Passant left the program. Logo changed the name to 365gay News and CBS News brought in correspondent Ross Palombo to anchor and revamp the show.

On August 13, 2009, Logo announced that its partnership with CBS News had ended. 365gay News became solely an online web site. Correspondent Hod, expressing his strong disagreement with the move, speculated that economic conditions in 2009 led to the decision.

=== Closure ===
In September 2011, 365gay.com announced that it would cease operations as of September 30.
