= Diana Vickers discography =

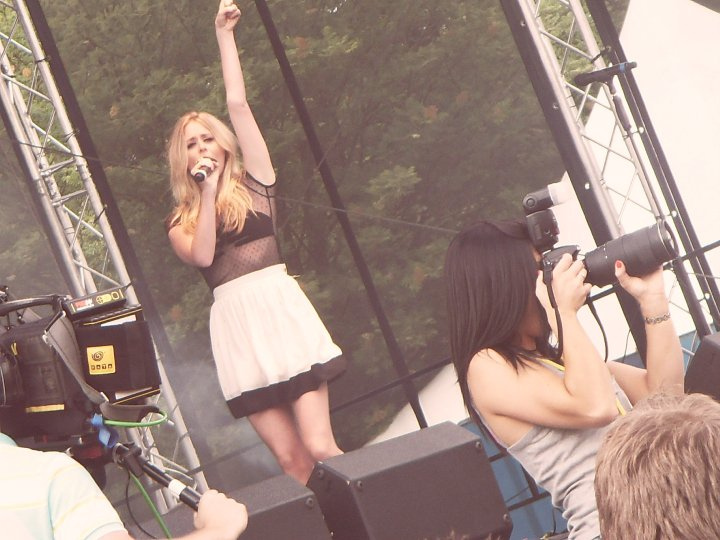
- Vickers performing live in 2010
- Studio albums: 2
- Extended plays: 1
- Singles: 7
- Music videos: 8
- Other appearances: 4

The discography of Diana Vickers, a British singer-songwriter, consists of two studio albums, one extended play, and six singles. Vickers debuted in 2008 as a contestant on The X Factor, a British television music competition. Her fourth-place finish brought Vickers to the attention of RCA Records, which signed her in 2009.

Vickers released her debut studio album Songs from the Tainted Cherry Tree in May 2010. The album reached number one on the United Kingdom albums chart and the top ten of the Irish Albums Chart. In August 2010, it was certified gold by the British Phonographic Industry (BPI). Two singles were released from the album: "Once" and "The Boy Who Murdered Love", with "Once" peaking at number one in the UK. "My Wicked Heart", a non-album song, followed in late 2010.

In July 2011, Vickers parted ways with RCA Records citing "musical differences" in the direction for the second album as the reason behind the mutual split. In February 2013, it was revealed that Vickers had signed a worldwide record deal with So Recordings. On 9 April 2013, it was confirmed that the lead single to Vickers' second album is titled "Cinderella", with a preview snippet being made available on iTunes. "Cinderella" was released to digital retailers on 21 July 2013 in the UK.

Vickers' second album titled, Music to Make Boys Cry followed on 15 September 2013 in the UK and Ireland along with the title track serving as the album's second single. The album charted at number thirty-seven on the UK Albums Chart and number nine on the UK Indie Chart on 22 September 2013. It also broke into the Top 20 of the Irish Independent Albums Chart peaking at number nineteen.

In August 2025, Vickers made a return to music following a 12-year break. Speaking to the Official Charts Company, Vickers describes her comeback single as, "It's super camp, super sexy and super fun." The single titled, "Ice Cream" was released on 22 August 2025 for digital download and streaming on Apple Music, Spotify and Amazon Music.

== Albums ==
=== Studio albums ===
Title	Album details	Peak chart positions						Certifications
Title	Album details	UK	UK Ind.	IRE	IRE Ind.	KOR	SCO	Certifications
Songs from the Tainted Cherry Tree	Released: 3 May 2010 (UK); Label: RCA; Formats: CD, digital download	1	—	7	—	15	2	BPI: Gold
Music to Make Boys Cry	Released: 15 September 2013 (UK); Label: So Recordings; Formats: CD, digital download	37	9	—	19	—	52	
"—" denotes releases that did not chart or were not released in that territory.

== Extended plays ==
Title	Details
iTunes Festival: London 2010	Released: 28 July 2010 (UK); Label: Sony; Format: Digital download

== Singles ==
=== As lead artist ===
List of singles, with selected chart positions and certifications
Title	Year	Peak chart positions						Certifications	Album
Title	Year	UK	UK Ind.	AUS	IRE	KOR	SCO	Certifications	Album
"Once"	2010	1	—	61	3	39	2	BPI: Silver	Songs from the Tainted Cherry Tree
"The Boy Who Murdered Love"	2010	36	—	—	—	16	28		Songs from the Tainted Cherry Tree
"My Wicked Heart"	2010	13	—	—	22	—	12		Non-album single
"Cinderella"	2013	76	13	—	—	—	68		Music to Make Boys Cry
"Music to Make Boys Cry"	2013	—	44	—	—	—	—		Music to Make Boys Cry
"Son of a Preacher Man"	2017	—	—	—	—	—	—		Son of a Preacher Man
"Ice Cream"	2025	177	—	—	—	—	—		TBA
"Pretty Boys"	2025	—	—	—	—	—	—		TBA
"—" denotes releases that did not chart or were not released in that territory.

=== As featured artist ===
Title	Year	Peak chart positions			Certifications	Album
Title	Year	UK	IRE	SCO	Certifications	Album
"Hero" (as part of The X Factor finalists 2008)	2008	1	1	1	BPI: 2× Platinum	Non-album single

== Other charted songs ==
Title	Year	Peak chart positions	Album
Title	Year	KOR	Album
"Sunlight"	2010	41	Non-album release

== Music videos ==
Title	Year	Director(s)
"Hero" (as part of The X Factor finalists 2008)	2008	Max & Dania
"Once"	2010	Harvey Brown
"The Boy Who Murdered Love"	2010	James Copeman
"My Wicked Heart"	2010	Sarah Chatfield
"Derail"	2013	Song by Dinosaur Pile-Up
"Cinderella"	2013	N/A
"Music to Make Boys Cry"	2013	N/A
"Ice Cream"	2025	Leo Cackett
"Pretty Boys"	2025	

== Other appearances ==
These songs have not appeared on a studio album released by Vickers.

Title	Year	Album
"Hero" (as part of The X Factor finalists 2008)	2008	Non-album release
"Music to Make Boys Cry (Demo)"	2011	Non-album release
"Kiss of a Bullet"	2011	Non-album release
"Chains"	2015	Non-album release
