= ITunes Festival: London 2010 =

iTunes Festival: London 2010 may refer to:

- The 2010 iTunes Festival
- iTunes Festival: London 2010 (Diana Vickers EP)
- iTunes Festival: London 2010 (Ellie Goulding EP)
- iTunes Festival: London 2010 (Florence and the Machine EP)
- iTunes Festival: London 2010 (Frank Turner EP)
- iTunes Festival: London 2010 (Ozzy Osbourne EP)
- iTunes Festival: London 2010 (Paloma Faith EP)
- iTunes Festival: London 2010 (Scissor Sisters EP)
- iTunes Festival: London 2010 (The Sword EP)
- iTunes Festival: London 2010 (Tinie Tempah EP)
