= The Best of Times =

Best of Times or The Best of Times may refer to:

== Music ==
- The Best of Times (album), a 1991 album by Murphy's Law
- Best of Times (My Sad Captains album), 2014
- The Best of Times (song), a 1980 song by Styx
- "The Best of Times", a song by Sheryl Crow on her Feels like Home 2013 album
- "The Best of Times", a song by Dream Theater from Black Clouds & Silver Linings
- "The Best of Times", a song from the musical La Cage aux Folles (musical)
- "Best of Times", a song by Peter Cetera from One More Story

== Films ==
- The Best of Times (1986 film), a film starring Robin Williams and Kurt Russell
- The Best of Times (2002 film), a Taiwanese film directed by Chang Tso-chi
- Best of Times (1981 film), a Don Mischer film starring Crispin Glover and Nicolas Cage
- Best of Times (2009 film), a Thai film directed by Yongyoot Thongkongtoon

== Other uses ==
- The Best of Times (TV pilot), a 1983 short-lived TV series
- The Best of Times (Shreveport), a monthly news magazine published in Shreveport, Louisiana
- The British title of the musical Showtune
