= Calling Festival =

Annual music festival

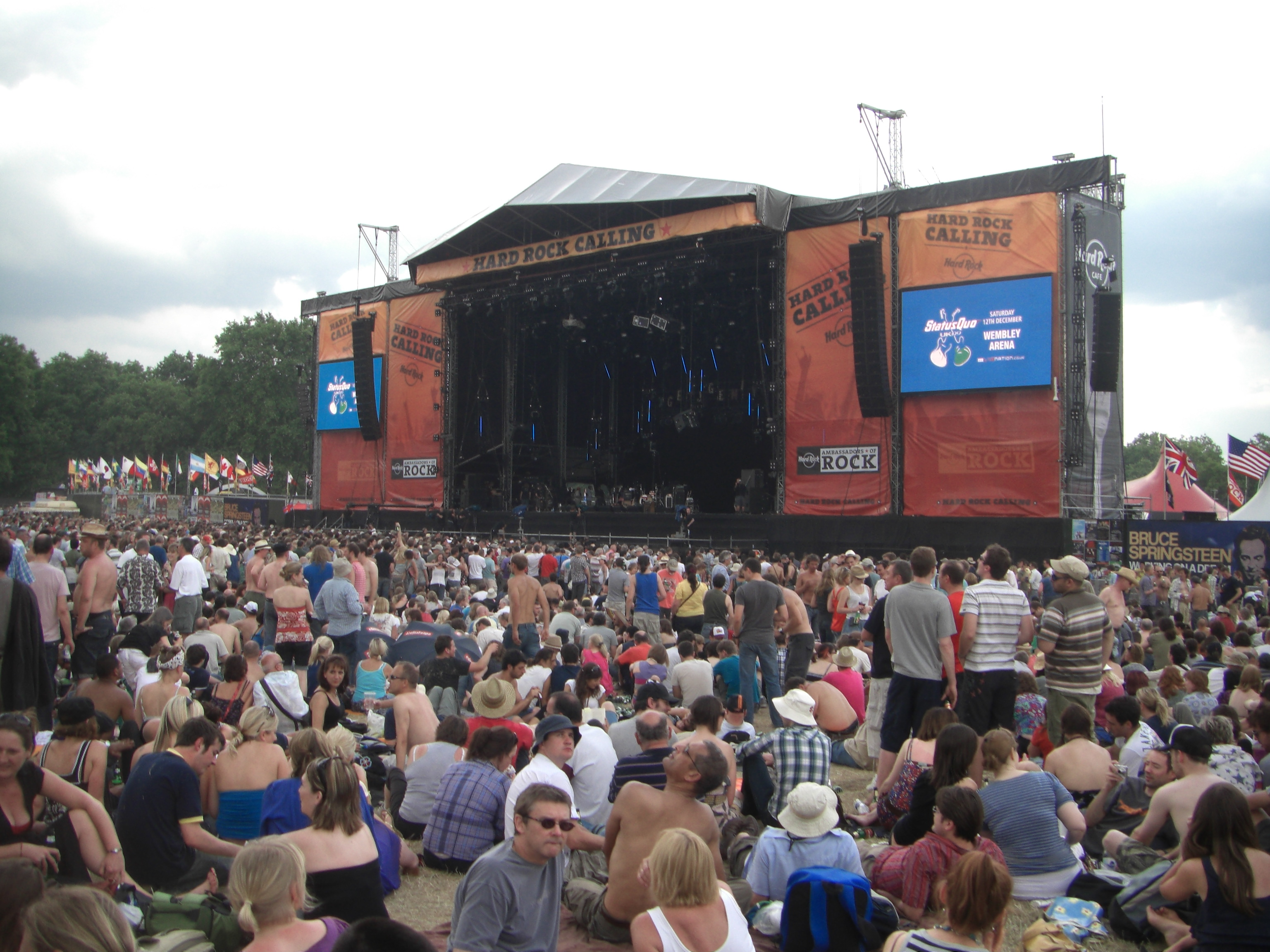
The 2009 Hard Rock Calling Festival

Calling Festival (formerly Hyde Park Calling and Hard Rock Calling) was an annual music festival, formerly held in Hyde Park, London, from 2006 until 2012, and from 2013 in Queen Elizabeth Olympic Park, London. In September 2013, Hard Rock International announced that they would no longer be sponsoring the festival; however, the event returned in 2014 and 2015 under the name Calling Festival at the Clapham Common.

The music played is primarily rock music, and various performers, including The Killers, Paul McCartney, Eric Clapton, The Who, Bon Jovi, Roger Waters (with Nick Mason), The Police, Aerosmith, Neil Young and Bruce Springsteen have played at the event. The festival was organised by Hard Rock Cafe and Live Nation.

== Hyde Park Calling 2006 ==
The inaugural festival had two stages and was headlined by Roger Waters (performing in its entirety the Pink Floyd album The Dark Side of the Moon as part of his set) and his band (featuring Pink Floyd drummer Nick Mason) on the Saturday and The Who on the Sunday. Gates opened at 14:00, and the show ended at 22:15 on both evenings. The Who's Sunday headline performance was released as part of their Encore Series 2006 of CDs & DVDs. British TV Show Top Gear filmed a brief segment of The Who’s concert as part of a Van review between the three hosts.

The festival was a peaceful one, being inside the city the event required attendees to rely on external accommodation - unlike more popular festivals such as Download Festival or Reading and Leeds Festival, which require camping on site for most people.

Despite the veteran status of the headline acts, most other bands were younger and with a more 'contemporary' audience, providing a contrast in musical styles. Since this festival, Razorlight particularly has acquired much fame and in under a year has gone from second slot in a smaller inaugural event like Hyde Park Calling to headlining the long-running and respected Reading/Leeds Festival. The festival mainstage proved to be unusually British, with the British Isles being represented by seven English bands and two Scottish, with only one American and one New Zealand band from abroad. However of the ten second stage bands, three were from Canada and two from the USA.

(Main Stage)
Saturday	Sunday
Roger Waters (with Nick Mason); Texas; Starsailor; Breaks Co-op; Chris Difford	The Who; Razorlight; The Zutons; Ocean Colour Scene; Rose Hill Drive

Second Stage
Saturday	Sunday
The Lightning Seeds; Robert Cray; Suzanne Vega; Blackbud; Rocco DeLuca and the Burden	Primal Scream; The Casbah Club; Mobile; The Waking Eyes; Kharma 45

== Hyde Park Calling 2007 ==
After Hyde Park Calling's success, a Hyde Park Calling 2007 quickly entered planning stages. It was announced that the event would take place during the weekend of 23–24 June 2007. It was Aerosmith's first concert in the United Kingdom for eight years and featured Peter Gabriel and the recently reformed Crowded House as a joint-headliner for the first day. Other draws to this year's event were the addition of a new third stage. Only one band to have played at the previous Hyde Park Calling, Rose Hill Drive, played again in 2007. With six bands per stage, instead of five, and an extra stage, the expansion of the festival only a year after its inception was dramatic.

One of the many incarnations of the Buena Vista Social Club featured. Hyde Park Calling 2007's version of the band includes Manuel "Guajiro" Mirabal (trumpet), Orlando "Cachaito" López (double bass), Manuel Galbán (guitar) and Jesus "Aguaje" Ramos (trumpet). Unlike the previous years' mostly British mainstage, of the nine bands playing, three were American, one from New Zealand and one from Australia.

Despite Aerosmith having the headline slot on Sunday, Chris Cornell played for the same length of time. His set combined Audioslave and Soundgarden songs with his own. In keeping with the family theme Aerosmith brought with them, on Saturday Peter Gabriel's daughter sang and played percussion. On Sunday Cornell brought his two children onto the stage for the audience to see.

Aerosmith had to finish at 10.30 pm due to the curfew, and the police were forcing them to leave. The encore was the usual "Walk this Way" song, but featured Darryl McDaniels (commonly referred to simply as 'DMC'). This was the first time a member of Run-D.M.C. had performed with Aerosmith since their 2002 tour, five years previous.

Main Stage
Saturday	Sunday
Peter Gabriel; Crowded House; The Feeling; Ghosts; Forever Like Red; The Thirst	Aerosmith (with DMC from Run-D.M.C.); Chris Cornell; Jet; The Answer; Arckid; The Micki Free Electric Blues

The Pepsi Stage
Saturday	Sunday
Buena Vista Social Club; Jason Mraz; Captain; Gareth Gates; Under the Influence of Giants; Angus and Julia Stone	Joe Satriani; Rose Hill Drive; Fastway; TAB the Band; Black Stone Cherry; McQueen

Third Stage
Saturday	Sunday
Seth Lakeman; Rushmore; Borne; Terra Naomi; Ben's Brother; Amy Macdonald	Reuben; yourcodenameis:milo; Kids in Glass Houses; Brigade; Haunts; Enjoy Destroy

== Hard Rock Calling 2008 ==
In late December 2007, the Hyde Park Calling 2008 website was launched. It confirmed the dates for 28–29 June 2008.

On 28 January 2008, the headliners for each day were announced, along with two support acts for each day:

Main Stage
Saturday	Sunday
Eric Clapton; Sheryl Crow; John Mayer; Jason Mraz; Robert Randolph & the Family Band; Steve Boyce Band	The Police; KT Tunstall; Starsailor; The Bangles; Arno Carstens; The Micki Free Electric Blues

Second Stage
Saturday	Sunday
The Charlatans; Eddi Reader; Dawn Kinnard; The Loose Salute; Ryan Bingham; Scott McKeon	The Stranglers; Carbon/Silicon; The Flying Padovanis; Broken Records; The Galvatrons; Will Rendle

Attendance: 57,561; Capacity: 60,000

== Hard Rock Calling 2009 ==
In 2009, for the first time it was a three-day event, beginning on the Friday rather than a Saturday, running over 26, 27 and 28 June. Neil Young headlined on Saturday and his encore was a cover version of "A Day in the Life" by the Beatles. Paul McCartney joined him on stage for parts of this performance. Bruce Springsteen finished his headlining set with "Dancing in the Dark", while he also joined The Gaslight Anthem for their song "The '59 Sound". Springsteen's entire set was released on DVD in June 2010, titled London Calling: Live in Hyde Park.

Main Stage
Friday	Saturday	Sunday
The Killers; The Kooks; Howling Bells; Passion Pit; Chew Lips	Neil Young (with Paul McCartney); Fleet Foxes; Ben Harper; Seasick Steve; The Pretenders; Rudy Vaughn; The Original Sinners	Bruce Springsteen & the E Street Band; Dave Matthews Band; James Morrison; The Gaslight Anthem; Beauvoir/Free

Pepsi Max Stage
Friday	Saturday	Sunday
Echo & the Bunnymen; Metric; Silversun Pickups; Air Traffic; Screaming Lights	The Magic Numbers; Johnny Flynn; Mumford and Sons; Alberta Cross; Priscilla Ahn; Wallis Bird; Lyrebirds	Starsailor; Joshua Radin; The Low Anthem; Pretty Things; The Boy Who Trapped the Sun; Rudy Vaughn

== Hard Rock Calling 2010 ==
Hard Rock Calling 2010 took place of the weekend beginning 25 June. Wolfmother was scheduled to perform on Friday but backed out in advance.

Main Stage
Friday 25 June	Saturday 26 June	Sunday 27 June
Pearl Jam; Ben Harper & Relentless 7; The Hives; The Gaslight Anthem; Robert Francis	Stevie Wonder; Jamiroquai; James Morrison; Corinne Bailey Rae; Mary Mary; Micki Free; Bruce Springsteen and the E Street Band(DVD)	Paul McCartney; Crosby, Stills and Nash; Crowded House; Elvis Costello; Joshua Radin; More Than Me

Pepsi Max Stage
Friday	Saturday	Sunday
Gomez; Funeral Party; Chief; Expatriate; Paul Thomas Saunders	Melissa Etheridge; Alejandro Escovedo; Florence Rawlings; Rox; Rumer; Diane Birch; Maria Mena	The Breakers; Cocktail Slippers; The Len Price 3; Tiffany Page; The Urban Voodoo Machine; Delta Mid; Lissie; The Coronas; Joe Echo

Band Stand
Friday	Saturday	Sunday
Leah Mason; Michael Kiwanuka; Max Tuohy; Chakras	My Sad Captains; Lione Wolf; Mountain Man; Summer Camp; Zun Zun Egui	The Morning Benders; Pearly Gate Music; Here We Go Magic; John Grant; Beach House

== Hard Rock Calling 2011 ==
The 2011 festival took place over the weekend of 24–26 June.

Main Stage
Friday	Saturday	Sunday
The Killers; Kaiser Chiefs; James; Wolf Gang; Michael Kiwanuka	Bon Jovi; Ray Davies; Black Cards; Lissie; Vintage Trouble	Rod Stewart (with Ronnie Wood); Stevie Nicks; Adam Ant & the Good, the Bad and the Lovely Posse; Rumer; Train; Gugun Blues Shelter

Pepsi Max Stage
Friday	Saturday	Sunday
The Kills; Good Natured; Transfer; The Heartbreaks; Spector	Imelda May; Ryan Bingham; Gianna Nannini; Everline; Rainy Boy Sleep; Rosco Bandana	Lighthouse Family; Mike + The Mechanics; Barenaked Ladies; James Walsh; Jay James Picton; Stefany June; IAMWE

Bandstand
Saturday	Sunday
The Breakers; The Launderettes; The Contrast; Yellowire; Red White A Blues; Lee Macdougall	Vetiver; Zun Zun Egui; Alessis Ark; Veronica Falls; Gabriella Jones

== Hard Rock Calling 2012 ==
During the song "Twist and Shout", performed by Bruce Springsteen and guest Paul McCartney at the Saturday show, Springsteen was forced to cut his set short when he ran overtime on a council curfew. Paul Simon's set featured Hugh Masekela, Ladysmith Black Mambazo and Jimmy Cliff; it was released on DVD and album in June 2017, titled The Concert in Hyde Park.

"I don't recall anything of Hyde Park," Soundgarden bassist Ben Shepherd said in 2013, "except looking stage-right and seeing that Jimmy Page was watching us. So, if anything, we actually played a lot more professionally than we usually do. I thought we were spot-on."

Main Stage
Friday	Saturday	Sunday
Soundgarden; Iggy and The Stooges; Cold Chisel; Black Stone Cherry; Kids in Glass Houses	Bruce Springsteen and the E Street Band; John Fogerty; Lady Antebellum; The Nightwatchman; Hey Monea!	Paul Simon; Alison Krauss Featuring Jerry Douglas; Christina Perri; Punch Brothers; Robert Randolph; Karima Francis

Pepsi Max Stage
Friday	Saturday	Sunday
The Mars Volta; Skindred; Red, White & Blues; Hawk Eyes; The Dirty Youth	Amy Macdonald; Dawes; Gary Clark Jr.; Lawson; NEEDTOBREATHE; The Night	Big Country; gUiLLeMoTs; LP; Ryan Sheridan; Robert Ellis; Marlon Roudette; Ryan Sheridan

Hard Rock Rising Stage
Friday	Saturday	Sunday
Cocktail Slippers; Dive Bella Dive; Deap Vally; The Launderettes; Koo Koo Kitchen; FOS; Maker	Dylan LeBlanc; Jack Savoretti; Gabriel Bruce; Feral Singers; KonKoma; Tanya Auclaire; Brass Wires Orchestra	James Walsh; Marcus Foster; Life in Film; Nina Nesbitt; Sadie & The Hotheads; Bwani Junction; Molly McQueen

Band Stand
Friday	Saturday	Sunday
Sissy and The Blisters; Drop Out Venus; Vukovi; Turbogeist; Micro Jupiter; Scams	Sheilds; Danny Shah; Daytona Lights; Alistair Griffin; Richard Cowey; Halfway to New York	Peggy Sue; Alessi's Ark; Chailo Sim; Honey Ryder

== Hard Rock Calling 2013 ==
The 2013 event was moved to the Queen Elizabeth Olympic Park in Stratford after Live Nation had pulled out of the tender for Hyde Park. The 2013 festival returned to being a two-day event, unlike the four previous years which had run over three consecutive days. The first announcement was made on 5 March, when Kasabian and Bruce Springsteen & The E Street Band were confirmed as headliners. It would be the latter's second headline performance in consecutive years.

Main Stage
Saturday	Sunday
Kasabian; Paul Weller; Miles Kane; Twin Atlantic; Kodaline; Lower Than Atlantis; The Weeks	Bruce Springsteen and the E Street Band; The Black Crowes; Alabama Shakes; Zac Brown Band; Deaf Havana; The Carnabys

Pepsi Max Stage
Saturday	Sunday
The Cribs; Klaxons; Tribes; The View; The Twang; Twin Forks; Dark Horses; No (Los Angeles); Vuvu Vultures	Passenger; Lissie; Lawson; Flamin Grooves; Mayer Hawthorne; The Temperance Movement; Lonely The Brave

Hard Rock Rising Stage
Saturday	Sunday
Gaz Coombes; China Rats; Syd Arthur; My Preserver; Eliza and the Bear; Steve Cradock; Jack Savoretti; Yellowire; Josh Weller	Negramaro; Syd Arthur; Josh Doyle; Cody Chestnut; Josh Record; Bruno Major; Crowns; Stewart Mac

== Calling Festival 2014 ==
Hard Rock Calling returned under the name of Calling Festival from 28 to 29 June 2014 at Clapham Common. It was renamed Calling Festival when the previous sponsor, Hard Rock International, pulled out.

Main Stage
Saturday	Sunday
Aerosmith; Joe Bonamassa; Thunder; Richie Sambora; Radkey; Heaven's Basement; 3 Dudes	Stevie Wonder; Jack Johnson; Paloma Faith; Michael Kiwanuka; James Bay; Jetta

Pepsi Max Stage
Saturday	Sunday
The Jezabels; Walking Papers; Toseland; Lonely The Brave; No Hot Ashes; Tax The Heat; Chantal Claret; Yellowire	Gregory Porter; Flyte; Norma Jean Martine; Bruno Major; Jack Garratt; Will Heard; JJ Rosa

== Calling Festival 2015 ==
Calling Festival returned to Clapham Common the following year, but only as a one-day festival, on 4 July.

Main Stage
Saturday
- Noel Gallagher's High Flying Birds
- Ryan Adams and The Shining
- Modest Mouse
- The Hives
- Echo & the Bunnymen
- Sunset Sons
- Elle King

Stage 2
Saturday
- Wolf Alice
- Bleachers
- James Veck-Gilodi
- OSCA
- Sundara Karma
- VANT
- White Room
