= Music to Make Boys Cry =

Studio album by Diana Vickers
- Released: 13 September 2013
- Recorded: 2010–13
- Genre: Electropop
- Length: 37:13
- Label: So Recordings
- Producers: Simen Eriksrud; David Gamson; Ant Whiting

Diana Vickers chronology
Songs from the Tainted Cherry Tree (2010)	Music to Make Boys Cry (2013)

Singles from Music to Make Boys Cry
- 1. "Cinderella" Released: 21 July 2013; 2. "Music to Make Boys Cry" Released: 15 September 2013

Music to Make Boys Cry is the second studio album by English singer and songwriter Diana Vickers, released on 13 September 2013 by So Recordings. The album's lead single, "Cinderella", was released to digital retailers on 21 July 2013. The album features production from the likes of David Gamson, Simen Eriksrud and Ant Whiting, and as well as "Cinderella", includes two tracks previously premiered online - the title track itself and "Boy in Paris". On 24 July 2013, Vickers unveiled the album's artwork and track listing via Amazon.

== Background ==
In June 2010, Vickers announced that she had started preparing songs for a second album. In an interview with Orange, Vickers revealed that the new direction would be "sexy", "adventurous" and inspired and influenced by indie and rock music, citing the works of The xx, The Doors, Siouxsie and the Banshees and Björk. Vickers has co-written material with Nerina Pallot (who penned "Put It Back Together" for Vickers' debut album), Eg White (who co-wrote "Once"), Starsmith, Chris Braide and Dee Adam (who co-wrote "My Wicked Heart" with Vickers). On 6 January 2011 Vickers travelled to Los Angeles, United States, to co-write material with John Shanks and Diane Warren. On 15 January 2011 Vickers played her debut gig in the United States at Cherry Pop in West Hollywood promoted via Perez Hilton.

Vickers made a second visit to Los Angeles on 14 March 2011 to do further studio work with John Shanks. On 30 June 2011 Vickers revealed on her official Tumblr account that she had parted company with RCA Records due to creative differences. She went on further to assure her fans that the second album is still proceeding and that she is proud of it. It was uncertain whether Vickers would be signed to a new record label or would release her album independently. Vickers was signed to So Recordings in early 2013.

On 1 July 2011 it was reported that the mutual separation between Vickers and her management was due to musical direction where Vickers wants to pursue a more indie, less commercial route. On 13 July 2011 Popjustice reviewed three tracks from Vickers' second album, "Boy in Paris", "Cinderella" and "Music to Make the Boys Cry", commenting that the songwriting standard was extremely high and that "the tunes – the melodies – are huge". The article presented how the three tracks were a result of studio sessions with Donkeyboy and Miranda Cooper.

On 9 December 2011, Vickers released the promotional single "Music to Make Boys Cry" for free download on her website. A week later, "Kiss of a Bullet", a second promotional track, was released free of charge by asking fans to publish a Twitter or Facebook post to gain access to the download. On 8 and 9 February 2012, Vickers showcased material from her second album in a mini-tour at The Ruby Lounge in Manchester and Cargo in Shoreditch, London. Songs performed by Vickers were: "Music to Make Boys Cry", "Kiss of a Bullet", "Boy in Paris", "Lightning Strikes", "Better in French", "Dead Heat" and "Smoke".

In April 2012 a new song by Vickers titled "Low" leaked online. In July 2012 another new song titled "Colours" had leaked online. Vickers later cited Blondie, Kylie Minogue, Madonna and Robyn as the album's main influences. On 4 December 2012 another new song "Bright Eyes" leaked online. Following this, Vickers ruled out the leaked tracks appearing on the album. On 29 July 2013, the album was available for pre-order on iTunes.

== Singles ==
"Cinderella" was released as the lead single on 21 July 2013. Co-written by Miranda Cooper of Xenomania fame, the video features Vickers attending a party at a mansion and falling in love with one of the guests there. The video premiered during the week commencing 27 May 2013. The single premiered on BBC Radio 1 in April 2013.

"Music to Make Boys Cry" is the title track released alongside the album on 15 September 2013. The track starts downbeat but soon morphs into a very modern empowerment anthem. Vickers explains the concept actually came about because she was on an aeroplane and saw the phrase ‘music to make boys cry’ in a newspaper article and got really excited and wanted to make a song that had that included.

== Critical response ==
Professional ratings
Review scores
Source	Rating
Attitude	4/5
Digital Spy	3/5 stars
Gigwise	8/10 stars
MuuMuse	very positive
omg!	positive
So So Gay	5/5 stars

Music to Make Boys Cry received generally positive reviews, with many music critics praising the contribution of songwriter and producer Miranda Cooper. Siobhan Frew of Gigwise wrote that Music to Make Boys Cry "mixes modern pop sounds with a tribute to the eighties synth pop era" and described it as "an impressive record" that "maintains a consistently good throughout, with each track standing on its own merits." Attitude magazine called it "a first class effort" and described it as "a collection of knockout pop tunes," with "catchy hooks, fresh production and clever lyrics." Andy Hastings of So So Gay hailed it as "one of the most straightforward, melodic, carefree and yet totally accomplished pop albums in years," and stated that "this is precisely how modern pop should be done." Bradley Stern of MuuMuse found the album "full of gorgeous melodies and sticky hooks" and placed it "up there with other sparkling mid-naughties electro-pop productions, including [...] What Will the Neighbours Say?, [...] State of Mind and [...] Come and Get It." Jon O'Brien of omg! called it "a vibrant and unexpectedly glittery second effort which deserves to find a much wider audience than it will inevitably receive." John Copsey of Digital Spy gave a more moderate review, saying that the album lacks "Diana's own stamp" and felt that it "loses its way by the finish." However, he concluded by stating that "there's little denying Vickers's knack for a giant pop hook."

== Track listing ==
Standard edition
No.	Title	Writer(s)	Length
1.	"Music to Make Boys Cry"	Diana Vickers, Miranda Cooper, Simen Eriksrud, Simone Larsen	3:30
2.	"Cinderella"	Vickers, Cooper, Eriksrud, Larsen	3:43
3.	"Lightning Strikes"	Vickers, Cooper, David Gamson	3:31
4.	"Dead Heat"	Vickers, Cooper, Eriksrud, Rachel Moulden	3:48
5.	"Boy in Paris"	Vickers, Cooper, Gamson	3:33
6.	"Mad at Me"	Vickers, Cooper, Dee Adams, Daniel Radcliffe	3:15
7.	"Smoke"	Vickers, Cooper, Cramer	3:56
8.	"Mr. Postman"	Vickers, Cooper, Jimmy Harry, Gerard O'Connell	3:41
9.	"Better in French"	Vickers, Cooper, Gamson	3:49
10.	"Blame Game"	Vickers, Cooper, Eriksrud, Larsen, Espen Berg	4:27

Deluxe edition bonus tracks
No.	Title	Writer(s)	Length
11.	"Cinderella" (Acoustic version)	Vickers, Cooper, Eriksrud, Larsen	3:46
12.	"Music to Make Boys Cry" (Acoustic version)	Vickers, Cooper, Eriksrud, Larsen	3:26
13.	"Better in French" (Acoustic version)	Vickers, Cooper, Gamson	3:11

== Charts ==
Chart (2013)	Peak position
Irish Independent Albums Chart	19
Scottish Albums Chart	52
UK Albums Chart	37
UK Independent Albums Chart	9

== Release history ==
Region	Date	Format	Label	Edition
Ireland	13 September 2013	CD, digital download	So Recordings	Standard, deluxe
United Kingdom	15 September 2013	CD, digital download	So Recordings	Standard, deluxe
United States	17 September 2013	Digital download	Silva Screen Records	Deluxe
