= Apple Music Festival =

Former concert series held by Apple, Inc

Coordinates: 51.5432°N 0.1519°W

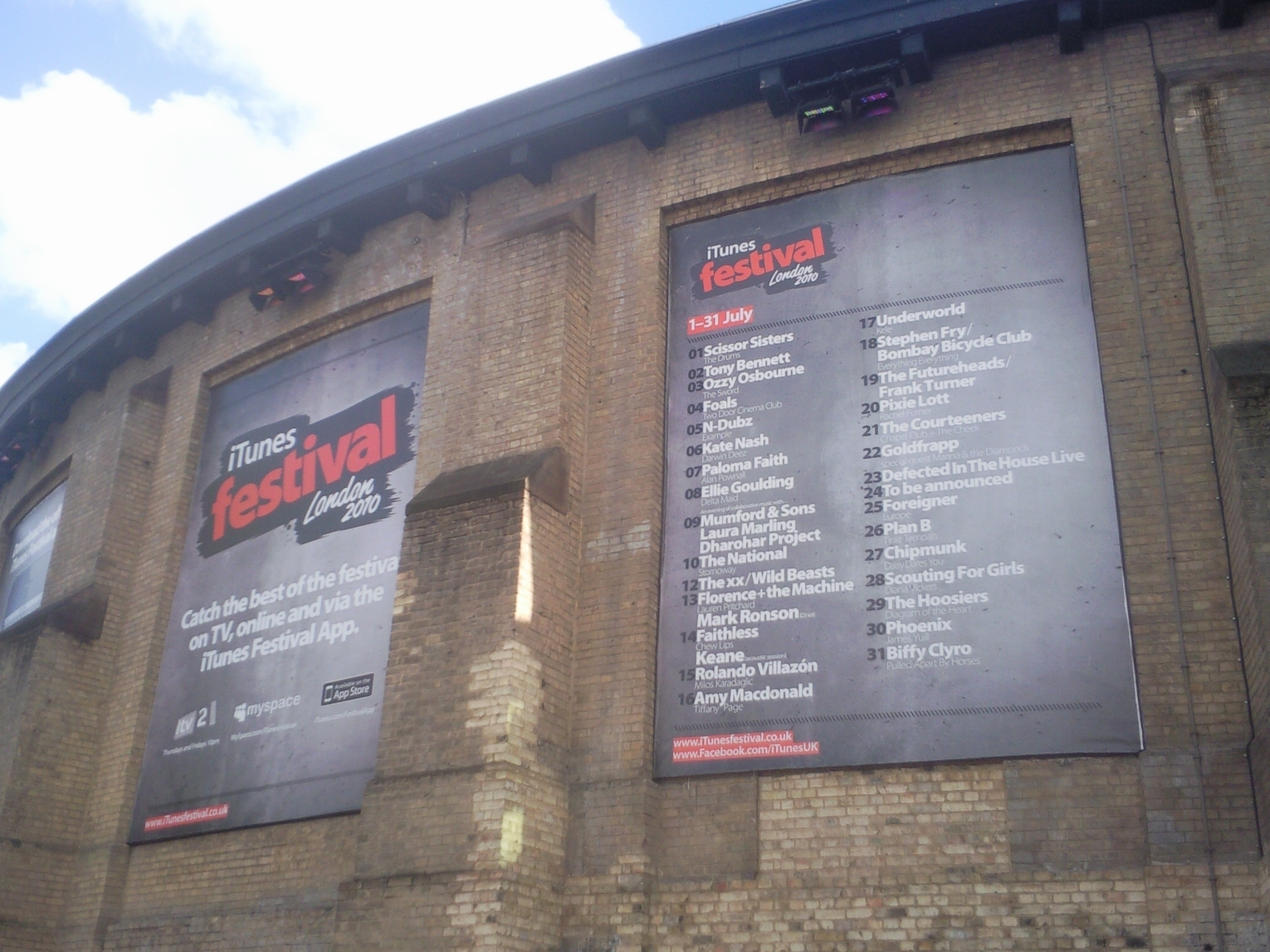
- Exterior view of the venue advertising the 2010 series
- Dates: 1–30 July (2007–11); 1–30 September (2012–14); 19–28 September (2015); 18–30 September (2016)
- Locations: London, England; Institute of Contemporary Arts (2007); KOKO (2008); The Roundhouse (2009–16); Austin, Texas; Moody Theater
- Years active: 2007–16
- Website: Festival Website

The Apple Music Festival (formerly known as the iTunes Festival) was a concert series held by Apple, Inc. and inaugurated in 2007. Free tickets were given to Apple Music, iTunes and DICE users who lived in the United Kingdom, through localized prize draws. Performances were streamed live and available to view afterwards, free of charge, for Apple Music members on their Apple TV, iPhone, iPad, iPod touch, Mac, PC, and Android phones. In London, the Apple Music Festival became an annual event taking place (from 2009) in September at the Roundhouse arts centre in Camden Town. The series made its United States debut with five days of free performances at the Moody Theater in March 2014, alongside the South by Southwest (SXSW) music showcase in Austin, Texas.

In August 2015, the iTunes Festival was renamed as the Apple Music Festival. In 2017, after a 10-year run, Apple confirmed to Music Business Worldwide that it would no longer host any music festivals.

== 2007 ==
Held at the Institute of Contemporary Arts.

- Mika
- Travis
- Groove Armada
- Kasabian
- Stereophonics
- The Maccabees
- Athlete
- Amy Winehouse
- Ludovico Einaudi
- Crowded House
- Jamie Woon
- Beverley Knight
- Paolo Nutini
- Editors
- The Pigeon Detectives
- Scott Matthews
- Imogen Heap
- Jack Peñate
- David Ford
- Black Rebel Motorcycle Club
- Athlete
- Ben's Brother
- Elisa
- The Hoosiers
- Cherry Ghost
- Remi Nicole
- The Coral
- The Go! Team
- Air Traffic
- Nine Black Alps
- Just Jack
- Terra Naomi
- Raul Midón
- Kano
- The Bumble Strips
- Aqualung
- Mutya Buena
- Beverley Knight
- GoodBooks
- Leon Jean-Marie
- Wir sind Helden
- Jamie Scott & The Town
- Tiny Dancers
- Goldspot
- The Bad Plus
- Leash

== 2008 ==
Held at KOKO, Camden Town.

- July 1: N*E*R*D + Kenna + Chester French
- July 2: Paul Weller + Glasvegas
- July 3: Hadouken! + Does It Offend You, Yeah?
- July 4: The Feeling + Gabriella Cilmi
- July 5: Roots Manuva + Sway
- July 6: Elliot Minor + Kids In Glass Houses
- July 7: The Black Kids + Foals
- July 8: Lightspeed Champion + Pete & The Pirates
- July 9: The Ting Tings + Florence & The Machine
- July 10: Jamie Lidell + Yelle + Laura Izibor
- July 11: The Script + Sam Beeton
- July 12: James Blunt + Beth Rowley
- July 13: John Legend
- July 14: Death Cab For Cutie + I Was A Cub Scout
- July 15: The Zutons (EP) + Red Light Company
- July 16: CSS + Alphabeat
- July 17: Guillemots + Lykke Li
- July 18: The Music + XXT
- July 19: Feeder (EP) + Infadels
- July 20: Neil Cowley Trio + Portico Quartet
- July 21: Sam Sparro + Annie
- July 22: Suzanne Vega + Seth Lakeman
- July 23: The Script + Sam Beeton
- July 24: McFly
- July 25: Taio Cruz + Jay Sean
- July 26: Chaka Khan ** cancelled **
- July 27: Royworld + Tom Baxter
- July 28: Pendulum + INME
- July 29: The Ahn Trio + Hayley Westenra
- July 30: The Pretenders + Gemma Hayes

== 2009 ==
Held at The Roundhouse, Camden Town.

- July 1: Jamie T + Slow Club
- July 2: Fightstar + Young Guns
- July 3: Jack Penate + Golden Silvers
- July 4: Flo Rida + Ironik
- July 5: Snow Patrol (EP) + Silversun Pickups + Animal Kingdom
- July 6: Franz Ferdinand + Passion Pit
- July 7: Mr Hudson w/ Kanye West + Kid Cudi + Kid British
- July 8: David Guetta w/ Kelly Rowland
- July 10: Paolo Nutini + Marina and the Diamonds
- July 11: La Roux + Dan Black
- July 12: Stephen Fry + Mumford & Sons (EP) + The Temper Trap
- July 13: Newton Faulkner + Raygun
- July 14: Placebo (album) + General Fiasco (EP)
- July 15: Friendly Fires + Magistrates
- July 16: Simple Minds
- July 17: Noisettes + Skint & Demoralised
- July 18: Calvin Harris + Miike Snow
- July 19: Bat for Lashes
- July 20: Bloc Party + Delphic + The Invisible
- July 21: Oasis + The Enemy
- July 22: Kasabian (EP) + Twisted Wheel
- July 23: Graham Coxon + Esser
- July 24: a-ha + Reamonn
- July 25:
- July 26: Madeleine Peyroux + Imelda May
- July 27: The Saturdays + Sophie Ellis-Bextor + Girls Can't Catch
- July 28: Amadou and Mariam + Charlie Winston
- July 29: Simian Mobile Disco + Gold Panda
- July 30: The Hoosiers + Steve Appleton
- July 31: MIKA + Erik Hassle

== 2010 ==
Held at The Roundhouse, Camden Town and live streamed on MySpace.com

- July 1: Scissor Sisters (EP) + The Drums
- July 2: Tony Bennett + Antonia Bennett
- July 3: Ozzy Osbourne (EP) + The Sword (EP) + Black Spiders
- July 4: Foals + Two Door Cinema Club
- July 5: N-Dubz + Example
- July 6: Kate Nash + Peggy Sue
- July 7: Paloma Faith (EP) + Alan Pownall
- July 8: Ellie Goulding (EP) + Delta Maid
- July 9: Mumford & Sons + Laura Marling + The Dharohar Project
- July 10: The National + Stornoway
- July 11: Keane + We Are Scientists
- July 12: The XX + Wild Beasts
- July 13: Florence + The Machine (EP) + Lauren Pritchard
- July 14: Faithless + Chew Lips
- July 15: Rolando Villazón + Milos Karadaglic
- July 16: Amy Macdonald + Tiffany Page
- July 17: Underworld + Kele
- July 18: Bombay Bicycle Club + Stephen Fry + Everything Everything
- July 19: The Futureheads + Frank Turner
- July 20: Pixie Lott + Rachel Furner
- July 21: The Courteeners + Chapel Club + The Cheek
- July 22: Goldfrapp + Marina and the Diamonds
- July 23: Defected In The House live
- July 25: Foreigner + Europe
- July 26: Plan B + Tinie Tempah
- July 27: Chipmunk + Daisy Dares You
- July 28: Scouting For Girls + Diana Vickers (EP)
- July 29: The Hoosiers + Diagram of the Heart
- July 30: Phoenix + James Yuill
- July 31: Biffy Clyro + Pulled Apart By Horses

== 2011 ==
Held at The Roundhouse, Camden Town and broadcast by ITV2 and presented by Alexa Chung and Dave Berry.

- July 1: Paul Simon
- July 2: Seasick Steve + Smoke Fairies + Tove Lo
- July 3: Manic Street Preachers + Dry The River + Ramona + Ukulele for Dummies
- July 4: Linkin Park (EP) + Neon Trees
- July 5: Beady Eye + Steve Cradock + Gwyneth Paltrow
- July 6: Arctic Monkeys (EP) + Miles Kane
- July 7: Adele (EP) + Michael Kiwanuka
- July 8: Bruno Mars + Ed Sheeran
- July 9: My Chemical Romance (EP) + Evaline
- July 10: Glasvegas + Cat's Eyes + Beatsteaks
- July 11: Foo Fighters + Jimmy Eat World (EP)
- July 12: The Script + Loick Essien
- July 13: White Lies + The Naked and Famous + Alice Gold
- July 14: Friendly Fires + SBTRKT
- July 15: Hard-Fi + David Nicholls
- July 16: The Wombats + All The Young
- July 17: Raphael Saadiq + Bluey Robinson + Selah Sue + Medi
- July 18: Rumer + Caitlin Rose + Mark Radcliffe
- July 19: Katy B + Jamie Woon
- July 20: The Wanted + Dionne Bromfield + Encore
- July 21: Swedish House Mafia + Alex Metric
- July 22: Coldplay (EP) + The Pierces
- July 23: Mogwai + Errors
- July 24: Noah and the Whale + Fixers
- July 25: Lang Lang + 2CELLOS
- July 26: Magnetic Man + Alex Clare
- July 27: Example + Wretch 32 + Yasmin
- July 28: Chase & Status + Nero
- July 29: Kasabian (EP) + PENGu!NS
- July 30: James Morrison + Benjamin Francis Leftwich
- July 31: Moby + Silver Apples + The Killers

== 2012 ==
Held at The Roundhouse, Camden Town and broadcast across Channel 4's stations (including Channel 4, T4 and E4).

- September 1: Usher + Miguel
- September 2: Ed Sheeran + Charli XCX + Rudimental
- September 3: Olly Murs + The Milk
- September 4: Plan B + Delilah + Ryan Keen
- September 5: Emeli Sandé + Bastille + Gabrielle Aplin
- September 6: JLS + Conor Maynard
- September 7: Elbow + Bat for Lashes
- September 8: Jack White + Band of Horses
- September 9: deadmau5 + Foreign Beggars
- September 10: Norah Jones + Beth Orton
- September 11: The Killers + Jake Bugg
- September 12: Noel Gallagher's High Flying Birds + The Soundtrack of Our Lives
- September 13: P!nk + Walk the Moon
- September 14: Labrinth (EP) + Josh Kumra
- September 15: David Guetta + Calvin Harris
- September 16: Rebecca Ferguson (EP) + Laura Mvula
- September 17: Example + DJ Fresh + Hadouken!
- September 18: Andrea Bocelli (EP) + Laura Wright + CARisMA
- September 19: Matchbox Twenty + OneRepublic
- September 20: One Direction (EP) + Angel
- September 21: Jessie J + Lonsdale Boys Club
- September 22: Biffy Clyro + Frightened Rabbit
- September 23: Robert Glasper + José James
- September 24: Mumford & Sons + Willy Mason
- September 25: Lana Del Rey + Benjamin Francis Leftwich
- September 26: Ellie Goulding + Haim (EP)
- September 27: Madness + Reverend and The Makers
- September 28: Alicia Keys + Lianne La Havas
- September 29: Hot Chip + Kindness
- September 30: Muse + Natalie Duncan

== 2013 ==
Held at The Roundhouse, Camden Town.

- September 1: Lady Gaga + DJ White Shadow
- September 2: Sigur Rós + Poliça
- September 3: The Lumineers + Phox
- September 4: Paramore + Fenech-Soler
- September 5: Rizzle Kicks + Eliza Doolittle
- September 6: Queens of the Stone Age + Palma Violets
- September 7: Phoenix + Little Green Cars (Canceled because Phoenix's singer, Thomas Mars, was ill)
- September 8: Bastille + The 1975
- September 9: Arctic Monkeys + Drenge
- September 10: Jake Bugg + Valerie June
- September 11: Kings of Leon + Jimmy Eat World
- September 12: Elton John + Tom Odell
- September 13: Avicii + Henrik B
- September 14: Chic + Janelle Monáe
- September 15: Vampire Weekend + The Olms
- September 16: Jack Johnson + Bahamas
- September 17: Ludovico Einaudi + Agnes Obel
- September 18: Thirty Seconds to Mars + The Family Rain
- September 19: Kendrick Lamar + ScHoolboy Q
- September 20: Primal Scream + Skinny Girl Diet
- September 21: HAIM + Gabrielle Aplin + Bipolar Sunshine + Dan Croll
- September 22: Ellie Goulding + Laura Welsh
- September 23: Jessie J + Lawson
- September 24: Robin Thicke + Aloe Blacc
- September 25: Pixies + NO CEREMONY///
- September 26: Tinie Tempah + Naughty Boy
- September 27: Dizzee Rascal + Katy B
- September 28: John Legend + Tamar Braxton
- September 29: Justin Timberlake + Mikky Ekko
- September 30: Katy Perry + Iggy Azalea + Icona Pop

== 2014 ==
=== Austin ===
On February 19, 2014, Apple announced that the iTunes Festival would take place in the U.S. for the first time with a five-day festival at the Moody Theater, Austin, Texas from March 11–15, alongside South by Southwest.

- March 11: Coldplay + Imagine Dragons + London Grammar
- March 12: Kendrick Lamar + ScHoolboy Q + Isaiah Rashad
- March 13: Soundgarden + Band of Skulls + Capital Cities
- March 14: Pitbull + Zedd + G.R.L.
- March 15: Keith Urban + Willie Nelson + Mickey Guyton

=== London ===
On 21 July 2014, Apple announced some of the line up for the eighth iTunes Festival held at The Roundhouse, Camden Town

- September 1: deadmau5 + Friend Within
- September 2: Beck + Jenny Lewis
- September 3: David Guetta + Clean Bandit + Robin Schulz
- September 4: 5 Seconds of Summer + Charlie Simpson
- September 5: Kasabian + Tove Lo + Ellie Goulding
- September 6: Tony Bennett + Imelda May
- September 7: Calvin Harris + Kiesza
- September 8: Robert Plant + Luke Sital-Singh
- September 9: Sam Smith + SOHN
- September 10: Pharrell Williams + Jungle
- September 11: Maroon 5 + Matthew Koma + Nick Gardner
- September 12: Elbow + Nick Mulvey
- September 13: Paolo Nutini + Rae Morris
- September 14: David Gray + Lisa Hannigan
- September 15: The Script + Foxes
- September 16: Blondie + Chrissie Hynde
- September 17: Gregory Porter + Eric Whitacre
- September 18: Jessie Ware + Little Dragon + Charli XCX
- September 19: SBTRKT + Jamie xx
- September 20: Rudimental + Jess Glynne
- September 21: Ryan Adams + First Aid Kit
- September 22: Jessie J + James Bay
- September 23: Placebo + The Mirror Trap
- September 24: Ben Howard + Hozier
- September 25: Mary J. Blige + Gorgon City
- September 26: Lenny Kravitz + Wolf Alice + Katy Perry
- September 27: Kylie Minogue + MNEK
- September 28: Nicola Benedetti + Miloš + Alison Balsom
- September 29: Ed Sheeran + Foy Vance
- September 30: Plácido Domingo + Khatia Buniatishvili

== 2015 ==
On 18 August 2015, Apple announced some of the 2015 line up and confirmed that the festival had been rebranded as the Apple Music Festival. Held at The Roundhouse, Camden Town, the festival was broadcast via Apple Music.

- September 19: Ellie Goulding + Andra Day
- September 20: Take That + Charlie Puth
- September 21: Carrie Underwood + The Shires + Cam
- September 22: One Direction + Little Mix
- September 23: The Weeknd + Grace Mitchell + Justine Skye
- September 24: The Chemical Brothers + Hudson Mohawke
- September 25: Disclosure + NAO + Lion Babe
- September 26: Pharrell Williams + Leon Bridges
- September 27: Mumford & Sons + Jack Garratt
- September 28: Florence + The Machine + James Bay

== 2016 ==
In 2016 the Apple Music Festival 10 returned to The Roundhouse, Camden Town for its tenth year. The full line up was announced on 25 August 2016 via Beats1 by Julia Adenuga as a surprise during Chart with Brooke Reese. The festival was streamed live and on-demand via Apple Music. Beats1 also broadcast live interviews and performances from the festival. The festival was heavily promoted with artwork, pictures and videos on Apple Music's Instagram and Snapchat stories. Festival performers such as Britney Spears personally messaged UK fans via Twitter for exclusive free tickets to the artist's respective performances at the festival.

- September 18: Elton John
- September 19: The 1975 + Christine And The Queens
- September 20: Alicia Keys + Jordan Fisher
- September 21: OneRepublic + Passenger
- September 23: Calvin Harris + Disciples + John Newman
- September 25: Robbie Williams
- September 26: Bastille
- September 27: Britney Spears
- September 28: Michael Bublé
- September 30: Chance The Rapper

== Cancellation ==
In early September 2017, Apple announced that it would not be continuing the Apple Music Festival.
