= Rudy Vaughn =

American singer-songwriter

- Born: Rudy Vaughn Brannon; August 28, 1980 (age 46); Galesburg, Illinois
- Origin: Atlanta, Georgia, United States
- Occupations: Singer, saxophonist, musician
- Instruments: Vocals, saxophone, acoustic guitar, piano, drums,
- Years active: 2002–present
- Website: http://www.rudyvaughn.com/

Rudy Vaughn Brannon (born August 28, 1980) is an American musician, singer-songwriter, and recording artist.

== Biography ==
Born in Galesburg, Illinois and raised in Indianapolis, Indiana, he graduated from University of Kentucky with a Bachelor of Music degree with an emphasis on jazz saxophone. He moved to Atlanta in 2003 where he developed as a singer and songwriter and founded Melody Lane Studios. In 2009, he successfully lobbied the Rudy Vaughn Band to win Hard Rock Calling's American national battle of the bands, performing in London on the bill with Bruce Springsteen, The Killers, Dave Matthews Band, Neil Young, James Morrison and Ben Harper in front of 100,000 people.

Since 2010, Rudy Vaughn has been performing full-time with the A-Town A-List, traveling the contiguous US year-round to perform in high-end corporate and party settings. In 2013, Vaughn became founder and owner of 321 Events and Studios, an up-and-coming event production company and music studio based in the Atlanta area. Vaughn is currently in the process of launching a solo music campaign via LOUD (formerly called LoudFund).

== Media appearances ==
Vaughn has been featured on CNN International, Fox News, Downbeat and OZ magazine, as well as a featured recording artist, songwriter and performer for organizations such as Catalyst, Drive, and Orange Conference, INO records, Chick- Fil-A, 12Stone and Northpoint Churches, ReThink.org, and touring nationally with event band The A-Town A-List.
