= McQueen (band) =

British rock band

- Origin: Brighton, England
- Genres: Alternative metal, hard rock, post-grunge, nu metal
- Years active: 2004–2008
- Label: Demolition Records
- Members: Leah Duors; Hayley Cramer

McQueen was an English rock band from Brighton, formed in 2004. They released one album (Break the Silence) on Demolition Records. McQueen toured all over Europe and played shows in the US and Asia including headlining the Unite Festival in Vietnam in 2007. The band has not played any shows in the UK since the Velvet Revolver support tour in 2008.

== Live performances ==
McQueen started performing live in venues around their home town of Brighton in February 2004. By June of that year, they had started to play at venues in London, and from there began touring the UK as supporting artist for various acts including Roxy Saint and The Holiday Plan. Their first headline tour was a university tour in January/February 2005. They played seven UK university venues. 2005 also saw McQueen's first non-UK live performance, at Highfields Festival, Germany. Since starting out, McQueen have toured with W.A.S.P., Hanoi Rocks and Wednesday 13 and played the rock tent at Hyde Park Calling in June 2007. They undertook their first "proper" UK headline tour in January 2007 to promote the release of their first album. In 2008, they also supported Velvet Revolver on various tour dates on their 2008 Revolution Tour. They also supported HIM on their Down Under tour. McQueen appeared at the Gibson Summer Jam 2008 in Nashville, Tennessee. They also played a set at the Quart festival in Norway.

== Formation ==
Last line-up

- Leah Duors – vocals
- Hayley Cramer – drums

Past members

- Hattie Williams – bass 2004–2004
- Sophie Taylor – bass 2004–2006 and 2008–2008
- Gina Collins – bass (Jan – Sept 2007)
- Cat de Casanove - guitar
- Constanze Hart – bass guitar

Temporary stand-ins

- Vicky Smith – bass (Nov – Dec 2006, July 2007, Dec 2007 – Jan 2008)

== Discography ==
=== Albums ===
==== Break the Silence ====
Released on 22 January 2007, on Demolition Records.

=== EPs ===
You Leave Me Dead/Like I Care (2004) Furry Tongue Records

=== Singles ===
- "Running Out of Things to Say" (2005), Furry Tongue Records
- "Line Went Dead" (2007), released as a download-only through Demolition Records
