= Hey Monea! =

American rock band

Hey Monea
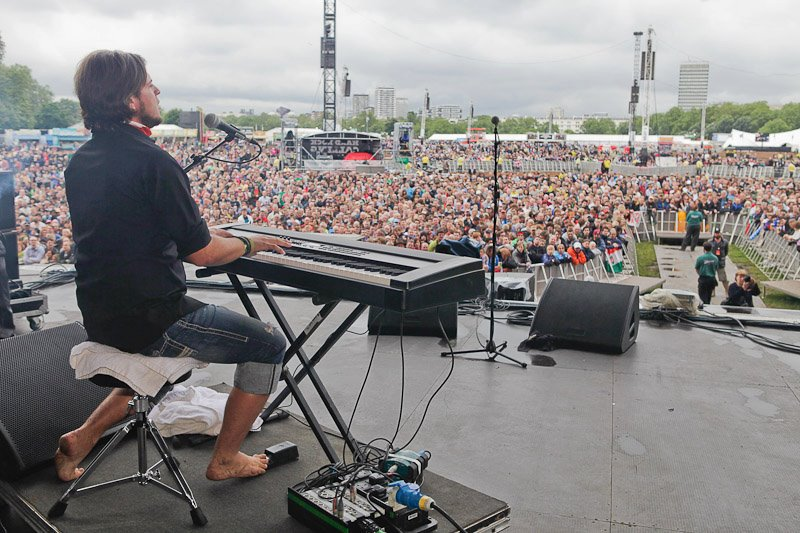
- Dan Monea London

Background information
- Origin: Canton, Ohio, U.S.
- Genres: Alternative rock; power pop; pop rock; pop-punk
- Years active: 2005–present
- Labels: Hard Rock Records; Noble Steed Music
- Spinoffs: Tender Hearted Rascals
- Website: heymonea.com

Hey Monea! is an American indie pop and rock band formed in 2005 in Canton, Ohio, originally consisting of brothers Dan Monea (vocals and guitar) and Nate Monea (vocals and drums), later joined by bassist Adam Orin, though recent lineups focus on the duo. The band is known for its emotionally driven songwriting, soaring harmonies, and a blend of piano-based pop-rock influences reminiscent of 1970s artists like Billy Joel and Jackson Browne.

Beyond music, the band has built a dedicated community through extensive touring, including performances at international festivals such as The Rock Boat and the 311 Cruise, as well as service-oriented trips to Guatemala with The Music Is Love Exchange, where they perform at schools and hospitals. Dan and Nate Monea, raised as Jehovah's Witnesses before leaving that community, infuse their work with themes of connection and service, referring to fans as their "ghetto family." They have also expanded into production, collaborating with artists like TONY-nominee Constantine Maroulis and Meaghan Farrell.

== History ==
=== Formation and first years (2005–2008) ===
Hey Monea! originated in Canton, Ohio, where brothers Dan Monea (guitar and vocals) and Nate Monea (drums) formed the band in 2005 under the initial name Hooked on Tonics. The siblings, who had collaborated musically since childhood through acoustic performances, began as a duo inspired by their shared passion for rock and pop.

Bassist Adam Orin soon joined the group, solidifying the core trio that would define the band's early sound. This lineup focused on high-energy, party-driven rock, performing at local Canton-area venues and community events to cultivate a dedicated grassroots audience through DIY shows.

The band's first notable performance occurred at a Canton bar in late 2005, marking their entry into the regional scene. By 2006, they had progressed to initial recording sessions in home studios, producing raw demos that blended alternative rock elements and helped refine their emerging alt-pop style. Their debut release as Hooked on Tonics, the album Do You Wanna?, arrived that year, capturing the spirited, unpolished vibe of their early material. Through 2007, the trio stabilized their lineup and continued honing their craft via consistent local gigs, laying the groundwork for broader recognition while transitioning toward the Hey Monea! moniker.

=== Debut album and initial recognition (2008–2010) ===
In 2009, Hey Monea! released their debut album Wine, Women and Song, marking the band's evolution from their earlier project Hooked on Tonics. The eight-track recording featured songs such as "Until Then," "Song for the Summer," "Sex Hair," and "Ballad of Moonbeam Swiner," showcasing the brothers Dan and Nate Monea's blend of rock, blues, and soul influences with energetic harmonies.

The album received attention in regional music circles, with the single "Ballad of Moonbeam Swiner" gaining traction and opening performance opportunities for the band across Ohio and beyond. Critics noted the group's shift toward a more polished pop-rock sound while retaining raw, party-oriented energy from their roots, contributing to early buzz in Cleveland and Canton outlets. During this period, Hey Monea! balanced local gigs with day jobs, self-funding initial efforts to build a regional following before their next major release in 2013.

=== Breakthrough period and touring (2011–2015) ===
During the early 2010s, Hey Monea! experienced significant growth in visibility, beginning with their participation in the Rombello Spring Break Jam cruise in September 2011, where they performed alongside acts such as Slightly Stoopid, Michael Franti & Spearhead, and G. Love & Special Sauce aboard the Carnival Inspiration from Tampa to Cozumel. This exposure marked an early step in expanding beyond their Midwest base, building on regional momentum from their debut era. The band's momentum accelerated in 2012 when they emerged as winners of the international 2012 Hard Rock Calling competition, sponsored by Hard Rock Cafe, through fan votes on the company's website and at participating venues. This victory secured them an opening slot at the Hard Rock Calling festival in London's Hyde Park on July 14, 2012, where they performed a six-song set for approximately 50,000 attendees ahead of headliners John Fogerty, Lady Antebellum, and Bruce Springsteen & the E Street Band (with surprise guest Paul McCartney). Their set, featuring tracks like "Stay For the Summer" and "The Ballad of Moonbeam Swinger," was broadcast on jumbo screens and later provided to the band on DVD, highlighting their professional poise amid interactions with artists such as Tom Morello and Jimmy Page backstage.

The success of Hard Rock Rising led to a recording contract with the indie label Hard Rock Records later in 2012, enabling the band to work with Grammy-winning producer Dennis Herring in Oxford, Mississippi. This collaboration resulted in their debut full-length album as Hey Monea!, Cheap Souvenirs, released in 2013, which emphasized minimalist alternative folk rock with acoustic guitars, banjos, piano-driven melodies, and layered vocal harmonies to create an intimate, rootsy sound. Standout tracks included the folksy love ballad "Adeline," the piano-led "Pollyanna" with its gripping lyrics and harmonies, and the serene title track "Cheap Souvenirs," which captured the album's reveling-in-the-moment vibe. While not charting on major lists, the album received local acclaim for its honest songwriting and served as a foundation for further U.S. touring along the East Coast college circuit and regional festivals. That year, they also headlined events like the 4th Street Concert Series in Canton, Ohio, solidifying their draw in the Midwest.

By 2014–2015, Hey Monea! reached a commercial peak with expanded touring and the release of their third album, The Fifty, in October 2015 on Noble Steed Music. Self-produced alongside engineer Joe Secchiaroli, the album was recorded in a rented Florida house during winter 2014, where the band cleared living spaces for live tracking to encourage spontaneous creativity, followed by vocal sessions in Secchiaroli's Manhattan studio in April 2015. Key tracks highlighted their upbeat, hook-driven style, including the opener "Filthy Rich" with its tongue-in-cheek rock 'n' roll glamour and Prince-inspired guitar solo, the Drifters-esque "Buenos Noches" featuring unconventional percussion from a washing machine, and the emotional "Save Me" blending R&B rhythms with big harmonies. This period included sold-out local shows, such as their 2012 holiday concert at The Auricle in Canton—part of a broader wave of peak performances—and collaborations with regional artists like singer-songwriter Lauren Mascitti for duets. Plans for a mini-tour accompanied the album's CD-release event at Musica in Akron on October 31, 2015, underscoring their evolving national presence.

=== Recent developments and evolution (2016–present) ===
Following the release of their 2015 album The Fifty, Hey Monea! shifted focus toward digital distribution and streaming platforms to reach broader audiences amid evolving music industry dynamics. The band leveraged services like Spotify and Apple Music for promotions, adapting to the decline of physical sales and the rise of algorithmic discovery in the indie rock landscape.

In 2022, they issued Banner Year, their fourth full-length album, featuring 10 tracks that continued their alt-pop sound while emphasizing accessible, heartfelt songwriting suited for online playlists. This release marked a return to album format after years of sporadic singles, reflecting sustained creative output. Subsequent singles, including "Yacht Money" and "Lawn Chairs & Lemonade" in 2024, further highlighted their embrace of streaming, with the band amassing around 4,500 monthly listeners on Spotify by late 2024.

Complementing this, Hey Monea! expanded their YouTube presence with original content, live sessions, and covers, fostering direct engagement with fans through weekly music uploads.

Studio albums

- Wine, Women and Song (2009)
- Cheap Souvenirs (2013)
- The Fifty (2015)
- Banner Year (2022)
