= Cheap Souvenirs =

Studio album by Hey Monea!
- Released: September 2013
- Recorded: 2013
- Genre: Alternative rock
- Label: Hard Rock Records
- Producer: Dennis Herring

Cheap Souvenirs is the second album by the American band Hey Monea!, released in 2013.

The success of Hard Rock Rising led to a recording contract with the indie label Hard Rock Records, enabling the band to work with Grammy-winning producer Dennis Herring in Oxford, Mississippi. This collaboration resulted in their second full-length album. Cheap Souvenirs emphasized minimalist alternative folk rock with acoustic guitars, banjos, piano-driven melodies, and layered vocal harmonies. According to critics, standout tracks include the "folksy love ballad" "Adeline", the piano-led "Pollyanna", and the title track "Cheap Souvenirs".

== Critical reception ==
The Canton Repository named the album one of the best of 2013.

== Track listing ==
| No. | Title | Length |
|---|---|---|
| 1. | "Adeline" | 2:24 |
| 2. | "Pollyanna" | 2:54 |
| 3. | "Never Gonna Take You Back" | 2:40 |
| 4. | "Sweetness" | 2:53 |
| 5. | "When We Kiss" | 3:23 |
| 6. | "Stay" | 3:27 |
| 7. | "Ohio Lullaby" | 2:55 |
| 8. | "Cigarette" | 2:45 |
| 9. | "Six Day War" | 3:47 |
| 10. | "Cheap Souvenirs" | 4:10 |

== Personnel ==
Hey Monea!

- Dan Monea – lead vocals, guitar, piano
- Nate Monea – backing vocals, drums, percussion
- Adam Orin – bass

Additional musicians

- Ryan Doyle – guitars, backing vocals, mandolin
- Dennis Herring – programming, piano
