= Our Moment =

Women's perfume endorsed by band One Direction

Fragrance by One Direction
- Notes: Pink grapefruit, wild berries, redcurrants, freesia, jasmine petals, frangipani, creamy musk, sheer woods, white patchouli
- Released: 9 September 2013; 12 years ago
- Website: onedirectionfragrance.com

Our Moment is a perfume for women endorsed by English-Irish boy band One Direction. It was launched on 6 June 2013 in London. The line includes, besides the 30ml, 50ml and 100ml eau de parfum, a shower gel, and a body lotion.

The perfume was the best selling celebrity fragrance of Christmas 2013, with higher sales than products endorsed by other celebrities such as Lady Gaga's Fame, Nicki Minaj's Pink Friday and Britney Spears' Fantasy.

Our Moment is the first of the four fragrances to be promoted by One Direction, with That Moment, You & I and Between Us being the other three.

== Background ==
Speculation that a perfume was to be released began in mid-2012 and on 5 June 2013, the first official announcement about the fragrance was released. On 6 June, three images were revealed, previewing the bottle. Later, a full image of the bottle was revealed. The fragrance was presented the same day at a skyscraper in London.

There were 4-second trailers released from the week beginning Monday 12 August, one for each member. The full length advert for the fragrance was released on 24 August 2013. It features the song "My Favourite Things" which was originally performed by Julie Andrews from The Sound of Music covered by Diana Vickers.

Liam Payne has reported that the idea came from a fan's petition. "A Twitter fan started an online petition for us to launch a fragrance, and we talked to our management", he said.

=== Details ===
Its top notes are pink grapefruit, wild berries & redcurrants. mid notes are Fresh Freesia, Jasmine Petals & Frangipani. The base notes are Creamy Musk, Sheer Woods & White Patchouli.

Three different gift sets are available; 30ml perfume with body lotion, 30ml perfume with shower gel and 30ml perfume with shower gel and body lotion.

== Critical reception ==
The fragrance received mostly positive reviews, with Sugarscape saying "Though we find it hard not to be biased when it comes to all things One Direction, we can honestly say that their perfume is pretty damn good."

== Awards ==
The fragrance won an award at the Pure Beauty Awards for best female fragrance.

Year	Ceremony	Award	Result
2013	Pure Beauty Awards	Best Female Fragrance	Won
