= Borne (band) =

- Origin: Melbourne, Australia
- Genres: Rock
- Years active: 2003–present
- Label: Medici Studios
- Website: bornemusic.com

Borne is an Australian alt-rock band formed in Melbourne in 2003.

They released several EPs in their first 3 years of existence, but came to widespread attention only in 2007, when their single "The Guide" was featured as Single of the Week on a number of iTunes Stores worldwide, including the US store. iTunes took the unprecedented move of listing the free download worldwide. The band's debut onto the world digital stage was remarkable, soaring into chart high-points globally and resting at No. 13 in the US Billboard digital charts. The band was last-minute inclusion at the 2007 South by Southwest Festival, in Austin, Texas, an annual event where hundreds of musical acts from across the globe are showcased.

In 2006, one of the band's songs, Don't Go Now was featured during evictions on the Australian version of Big Brother. In the United States, The Guide was featured in the hit television program, Friday Night Lights.

Borne attracted attention in the Australian music industry when it played at two of the UK's big festivals, Hyde Park Calling and Glastonbury. It put the seal on 2007 when, from 5000 entrants, Borne took out the four most coveted awards at the MusicOz Awards 2007, the annual showcase event for independent Australian musicians. Borne won the Nova Initiative award; its lead singer Cameron Tapp received the award for best singer/songwriter. The band also won the Garth Porter Award and the major award, Artist of the Year. Further international recognition of the band and its lyrical appeal to network television audiences came with the inclusion of "Don't Go Now" in the US, ABC super-series 'October Road'.

As of 2007, the members of Borne are:

- Cameron Tapp- lead vocals and guitar;
- Steve Kucina- vocals and guitar;
- Pete McDonald- drums;
- Scott Thornburn- bass guitar

In 2009, "The Guide" (from the album Loss of Signal) was featured on an Australian advertisement for Pedigree's Adoption Drive.

== Tapp Overseas Trip ==
On 13 June 2008, Cameron Tapp flew from Australia to perform "The Guide" for a wedding in Fargo, North Dakota. The wedding couple had heard the song on iTunes and attempted to find the sheet music online so that it could be performed at their nuptials. Having difficulty doing so (because Tapp does not read or write music), the couple emailed the band via their website, inquiring about the availability of the song. Tapp himself responded, jokingly saying the couple could fly him to the United States to perform at their wedding. The couple decided to skip their honeymoon and instead used the money saved for it (approximately US$3000) to purchase Tapp an airline ticket. As of 2013, Borne is Cameron Tapp, the original founding member in 2007. He performs under the name 'Borne' when performing Borne songs live with a band of session musicians. Cam continues to write and licence songs under the 'Borne' brand name.
