= Give Out Girls =

- Genre: Sitcom
- Created by: Tony MacMurray; Hatty Ashdown
- Written by: Tony MacMurray; Hatty Ashdown
- Directed by: Chloe Thomas
- Starring: Diana Vickers; Kerry Howard; Cariad Lloyd; Miranda Hennessy; Tracy-Ann Oberman; Ben Bailey Smith; Alex Carter
- Country of origin: United Kingdom
- Original language: English
- No. of series: 1
- No. of episodes: 6

Production
- Executive producers: Kenton Allen; Robert Popper
- Producer: Jim Poyser
- Production locations: London, United Kingdom
- Editor: Pete Drinkwater
- Camera setup: Laurie Rose
- Running time: 30 minutes
- Production company: Big Talk Productions

Original release
- Network: Comedy Central
- Release: 14 October – 18 November 2014

Give Out Girls is a British television sitcom created by Tony MacMurray and stand-up comedian Hatty Ashdown. It was originally meant to be broadcast on Sky Living but on 16 July 2014 it was announced that the show would now air on Comedy Central. It began broadcasting on 14 October 2014. On 13 August 2015, Kerry Howard announced on her Twitter account that the show would not return for a second series.

== Plot ==
Give Out Girls is a sitcom about four girls (Zoe, Gemma, Marilyn and Poppy) who work in the world of promotions.

== Production ==
Ashdown used her time spent as a promo girl as inspiration for the series. The series began filming in and around Manchester in May 2013 and is distributed internationally by BBC Worldwide.

The cast were announced in May 2013. Vickers released a statement saying "I'm so excited about doing my first comedy show. It's different to any acting I've done before. The script is hilarious, I was laughing my head off just reading it. The rest of the cast are great, we all have really good chemistry. I can't wait to get in front of the camera and start filming!"

== Cast ==
- Diana Vickers as Gemma, the youngest sales girl who is naive and slightly dimwitted
- Kerry Howard as Marilyn, who at 29 is the eldest sales girl who is unlucky and accident-prone
- Cariad Lloyd as Poppy, a fun loving party girl
- Miranda Hennessy as Zoe, a bitchy and passive-aggressive sales girl from New Zealand
- Tracy-Ann Oberman as Debbie, the self-absorbed, politically incorrect boss
- Ben "Doc Brown" Smith as Andy, a cool and attractive employee
- Alex Carter as Steve, a socially inept boss

== Episodes ==
No.	Title	Original release date
1	"The Spanish Job"	14 October 2014
Debbie and Steve's business are hired to promote a new alcohol with the opportunity for the best sales girl to win a business trip to Spain. Marilyn, while attempting to prove she is the best employee accidentally flashes Steve, causing Steve to file a sexual harassment claim against her, much to the disbelief of Marilyn. Meanwhile, Poppy realises she has feelings for Andy. Marilyn attempts to match the pair, but finds Andy thinks Poppy is an 'under-coat' (a girl you would hide under your coat as you leave a bar). A company representative for the drink arrives, and advises Marilyn she will be picked for the trip. However Marilyn offends the woman by mistaking a mole as a piece of food, with Gemma ultimately being chosen to go to Spain. However after Debbie mocks the disabled and Steve sexually harasses the representative she decides that no one will win the trip and severs connection with the business. Later at a bar, Poppy and Andy decide to be just friends, however after multiple drinks make out and leave together, while Marilyn is hit on by an unattractive man whom she leaves with under her coat.
2	"The Hot Boy"	21 October 2014
While promoting hair extensions in a mall, Marilyn notices a hot model taking part in a wedding convention. With encouragement from the other girls, Marilyn talks to the model, eventually being invited to partake in the wedding catwalk where she makes out with him. Marilyn brags about her new relationship, but is horrified to find that the boy is only 15. She attempts to hide his age from the rest of the group, however the boy becomes heavily intoxicated and declares his love for Marilyn before urinating himself on the catwalk. The others discover the boy's age and Marilyn is left embarrassed. Meanwhile, Poppy, Gemma and Zoe fill in the forms to win a spa weekend from Debbie's company instead of handing them out. When Debbie discovers this she fires all three girls. However, after Debbie insults a deaf customer the girls cover for Debbie and win back their jobs.
3	"Hungry and Homeless"	28 October 2014
While promoting a new snack bar, Poppy encounters a homeless man that she instantly falls for. She hides the man in a nut costume and sneaks around with him the whole day. When the man swears to get a job and turn his life around, Poppy loses interest before Debbie eventually takes the man into the toilet with her, believing it to be Zoe in the costume. Upon realising it's not Zoe Debbie attacks the giant nut, gathering a large crowd. Meanwhile, Zoe informs Marilyn of a voluntary test which pays £1000. Marilyn is keen to take part, but realises she has to lose a pound of weight by the end of the day to take part. With the help of Gemma, Marilyn refrains from eating all day, but after donating blood to lose weight, she passes out and is rushed to hospital. In an attempt to prove that Steve isn't his boss, Andy eats a nut bar, despite being allergic, and is also rushed to hospital.
4	"Top Dog"	4 November 2014
The team is at a dog show, giving out free cans of V-Good vegan dog food but nobody wants any of them and in desperation Marilyn, who is in charge, gives them all to a geezer, who then sells them off at a pound at a time. Meanwhile Poppy decides that the dogs should be set free and almost succeeds in liberating them whilst Gemma is turned on by Steve giving commands to his dog, Andy, until the dog bites him and is disqualified from the show. The human Andy agrees to go on a date with Debbie's daughter – but wishes he hadn't.
5	"The Truth"	11 November 2014
Joined by new girl George the team, dressed as giant vegetables, is at a horticultural show where, on behalf of a frozen chip firm, they are enacting the history of the potato. Marilyn gets on well with George, who defends her against the others, but unfortunately George smells, as Zoe is only too keen to point out, having read the new motivational book 'The Truth' which inspires its readers to total honesty. It also inspires Poppy and Zoe to tell exactly what they think of each other – leading to all-out war.
6	"Overnight Stay"	18 November 2014
The team arrives at the luxurious Fairdale hotel where they are promoting I-Surf broadband provider, which involves dressing in wet suits as surfers. Marilyn is annoyed when convention organizer Edward gets her into trouble with Debbie but they end up in bed together – leading to more trouble and the staff making a united stand to prevent Marilyn from getting fired. Poppy and Andy also get under the sheets but Andy can do without a drunken Steve perpetually flashing his bum. All ends happily though as the team drive off for a new assignment in London – promoting thrush awareness.
