= Ice Cream (Diana Vickers song) =

2025 single by Diana Vickers

Single by Diana Vickers
- Released: 22 August 2025
- Recorded: 2024
- Genre: Pop, Electropop
- Length: 3:19
- Songwriters: Diana Vickers; Dee Adams James Earp
- Producers: Dee Adams; James Earp

Diana Vickers singles chronology
"Music to Make Boys Cry" (2013)	"Ice Cream" (2025)

"Ice Cream" is a song co-written and co-produced by English singer Diana Vickers. It was digitally released on 25 August 2025 and was available for streaming on Spotify, Apple Music and Amazon Music in the United Kingdom. "Ice Cream" marks Vickers' return to music after a 12-year hiatus.

== Background ==
Vickers' new single "Ice Cream" marked her long-awaited musical comeback after more than a decade away from the pop music scene. Released on 22 August 2025, the track was produced by Dee Adams and James Earp, blending playful synths and dance-pop polish with Vickers’ quirky, theatrical edge. The single was conceived as a love letter to her LGBTQ+ fans, embracing queer joy, camp energy and unapologetic fun. With cheeky innuendo and a bright, addictive beat, it harks back to the whimsical charm of her early work while situating her sound firmly in contemporary electropop. Vickers has described the song as a celebration for"the gays and the girlies," capturing the spirit of inclusivity and flamboyance she wanted to channel in her return. More than just a summer anthem, "Ice Cream" reintroduces Vickers as a confident, self-aware pop artist.

== Critical reception ==
Vickers' comeback single "Ice Cream" was warmly received by critics, who praised its playful energy and bold camp aesthetic. Edge Media Network described it as a, "vibrant anthem for queer fans" highlighting its celebratory tone and dedication to LGBTQ+ audiences. Analoguetrash called it, "a party banger", noting its blend of cheeky innuendo, sass and addictive electro-pop production. Muumuse praised the track's lyrical playfulness and "deliciously camp" qualities, suggesting it was designed to thrive on summer playlists and dance floors. Zillions Magazine similarly emphasised its sassy, theatrical style, framing it as a confident reintroduction to pop after her hiatus. Critics agreed that "Ice Cream" successfully combines nostalgia for Vickers' earlier eccentric charm with a fresh, modern electro-pop sensibility, positioning her return as both joyful and relevant.
