= Songs from the Tainted Cherry Tree =

Studio album by Diana Vickers
- Released: 30 April 2010
- Recorded: March 2009 – January 2010
- Studio: Untouchable Sound (London) (Note: Tracks 3, 7 and 9); LSL (London) (Note: Track 5); Strongroom (London) (Note: Track 7)
- Genre: Dance-pop; folktronica; electropop
- Length: 47:10
- Label: RCA
- Producer: Chris Braide; Andy Chatterley; Dev Hynes; Nerina Pallot; Guy Sigsworth; Mike Spencer; Starsmith

Diana Vickers chronology
Songs from the Tainted Cherry Tree (2010)	Music to Make Boys Cry (2013)

Singles from Songs from the Tainted Cherry Tree
- 1. "Once" Released: 16 April 2010; 2. "The Boy Who Murdered Love" Released: 16 July 2010

Songs from the Tainted Cherry Tree is the debut studio album by English singer and songwriter Diana Vickers. Originally set for a November 2009 release, the album was postponed due to Vickers' leading role in the West End play The Rise and Fall of Little Voice, and it was finally released on 3 May 2010 in the United Kingdom.

Songs from the Tainted Cherry Tree debuted atop the UK Albums Chart, selling 35,951 copies in its first week of release. In August 2010, the album was certified gold by the British Phonographic Industry (BPI). "Once" was released on 19 April 2010 as the lead single from the album, peaking at number one on the UK Singles Chart.

== Background ==
Shortly after being eliminated from The X Factor in 2008, it was announced that Vickers had been signed to RCA Records and that she had begun working on her debut album. Recorded between April 2009 to January 2010, a five-track album sampler was leaked in January 2010. The track "Jumping into Rivers" had previously been leaked in July 2009. The track listing and artwork was changed a number of times, causing delays. The album title came from a track written by Chris Braide and Vickers called "The Boy Who Murdered Love", about which she later stated:

Basically, I co-wrote a song with Chris Braide called "The Boy Who Murdered Love" and there's a line in there about a tainted cherry tree and I found it very poetic. It painted imagery of the forbidden fruit and Adam and Eve and this boy that's absolutely beautiful and so tempting but so wrong for you!

— Vickers

Braide also collaborated with Vickers on three other tracks, "Me & You", "Four Leaf Clover" and "N.U.M.B", which were recorded at the songwriter-producer's London studio. The debut album saw Vickers work with an array of other writers and producers including Nerina Pallot, Andy Chatterley, Ellie Goulding, Cass Lowe, Savan Kotecha, Alexis Strum, Dev Hynes, Guy Sigsworth and Starsmith. Vickers's debut single, "Once", was co-penned by Cathy Dennis and Eg White, and produced and mixed by Mike Spencer. Vickers also collaborated with Gary Lightbody, the frontman of the alternative rock band Snow Patrol. The album contains a cover version of The Sugarcubes' 1992 song "Hit".

== Singles ==
"Once" was released as the album's lead single on 19 April 2010. Upon its release it generated mainly positive reviews from critics, with the most positive coming from Nick Levine of Digital Spy who called it a "straight up brain-invader" with a "huge chorus" that is "hard to ignore". The single achieved commercial success by topping the UK Singles Chart and debuting at number three on the Irish Singles Chart.

"The Boy Who Murdered Love" was confirmed as the second single by Vickers on Twitter on 7 May 2010. The music video premiered on 2 June 2010 via the MSN video player. The song was officially released on 18 July 2010, reaching number 36 on the UK Singles Chart.

== Critical reception ==
Professional ratings
Review scores
Source	Rating
BBC Music	Mixed
Digital Spy	5/5 stars
The Independent	Negative
The Irish Times	3/5 stars
London Evening Standard	2/5 stars
musicOMH	3/5 stars
NME	5/10
The Observer	Fairly negative
Virgin Media	4/5 stars
Yahoo! Music	5/10 stars

Upon its release, Songs from the Tainted Cherry Tree received mixed reviews from music critics. Mayer Nissim of Digital Spy stated that Vickers and her collaborators "have crafted an album that's drenched in accessible pop melodies while never sacrificing the charm and personality". Kevin Courtney of The Irish Times commented that "[t]he blend of pop and indie works in her favour—and having a few catchy songs helps." Johnny Dee of Virgin Media deemed it commercial but without sacrificing Vickers's "slightly eccentric charms" and noticed that it "works best [...] when it's mixing beats with folky whisperings", concluding that "[t]he girl's done great." musicOMH's Ben Urdang stated that "Vickers manages to achieve a consistency throughout so that the album sits comfortably as a fluid piece of work". He went on to add that although the album is not "groundbreaking nor perfect", it is "a solid start to her recording career". Mike Diver from BBC Music praised Vickers's voice for the ability to "stand out from any crowd" but was not astounded by the lyrics and the album as a whole, stating that the impression it leaves is "compromised by songwriting by committee" and noticed that it would have been "considerably improved" with "[a] little more compositional guile".

Elizabeth Sankey of NME faulted the album for its "telling lack of objectivity", adding that "if [Vickers had] concentrated on one genre, this might have been victorious." The Independent's Simon Price opined that the album "consists mostly of forgettable dance pop and folktronica" and that it "doesn't stand out", while Dan Gennoe of Yahoo! Music noted that it is "too busy trying to keep everyone happy to be anything other than indistinct and polite". David Smyth from the London Evening Standard felt that Vickers's voice is "almost indistinguishable" from Ellie Goulding's and concluded by saying that "her songs are blander but the public seems open to a singer who will do more interesting work than this [the debut]". Hugh Montgomery of The Observer felt that "despite employing indie-minded collaborators such as Ellie Goulding and Lightspeed Champion", the album was "given over to commercial box-ticking, matching generic electro-pop with the kind of tasteful balladry that suggests a Dido in-waiting."

== Commercial performance ==
Songs from the Tainted Cherry Tree debuted at number one on the UK Albums Chart, selling 35,951 copies in its first week. The album was certified gold by the British Phonographic Industry (BPI) on 27 August 2010, denoting shipments in excess of 100,000 copies in the United Kingdom. In Ireland, the album debuted and peaked at number seven on the Irish Albums Chart.

== Promotion ==
To promote the album, Vickers went on a tour or the United Kingdom and Ireland throughout 2010.

== Track listing ==
No.	Title	Writer(s)	Producer(s)	Length
1.	"Once"	Cathy Dennis; Eg White	Mike Spencer	3:11
2.	"Remake Me + You"	Vickers; Ellie Goulding; Guy Sigsworth	Sigsworth	3:35
3.	"The Boy Who Murdered Love"	Vickers; Chris Braide	Braide	3:21
4.	"Four Leaf Clover"	Vickers; Braide	Sigsworth	4:11
5.	"Put It Back Together"	Nerina Pallot	Pallot; Andy Chatterley	4:04
6.	"You'll Never Get to Heaven"	Vickers; Starsmith; Cass Lowe	Starsmith	4:02
7.	"Me & You"	Vickers; Dev Hynes; Braide	Hynes^{[a]}; Braide^{[b]}	3:05
8.	"My Hip"	Harmony Boucher; Tobias Karlsson	Spencer	3:24
9.	"N.U.M.B"	Vickers; Braide	Braide	3:59
10.	"Hit"	Björk Guðmundsdóttir; Sigtryggur Baldursson; Einar Örn Benediktsson; Bragi Ólafsson; Þór Eldon Jónsson; Margrét Örnólfsdóttir	Sigsworth	3:09
11.	"Notice"	Vickers; Goulding; Sigsworth	Sigsworth	3:34
12.	"Jumping into Rivers"	Vickers; Goulding; Sigsworth	Sigsworth	3:37
13.	"Chasing You"	Vickers; Boucher; Sigsworth	Sigsworth	4:07

iTunes Store bonus videos
No.	Title	Length
14.	"Track by Track Commentary"	11:16
15.	"Once" (Making of the Video)	4:03

=== Notes ===
- ^{^[a]} signifies an original producer
- ^{^[b]} signifies an additional and vocal producer

== Charts ==
=== Weekly charts ===
Chart (2010)	Peak position
European Albums (Billboard)	4
Irish Albums (IRMA)	7
Scottish Albums (OCC)	2
South Korean International Albums (Gaon)	15
UK Albums (OCC)	1

=== Year-end charts ===
Chart (2010)	Position
UK Albums (OCC)	108

== Certifications ==
Region	Certification	Certified units/sales
United Kingdom (BPI)	Gold	100,000^{^}
^{^} Shipments figures based on certification alone.

== Release history ==
Region	Date	Format	Label	Ref.
Ireland	30 April 2010	CD; digital download	RCA	
United Kingdom	3 May 2010	CD; digital download	RCA	
Poland	5 July 2010	CD	Sony	
Germany	6 August 2010	CD; digital download	Sony	
Worldwide	25 February 2022	digital download, streaming	Sony	
