= Cinderella (Diana Vickers song) =

Single by Diana Vickers

from the album Music to Make Boys Cry
- Released: 19 July 2013
- Recorded: 2011
- Genre: Synth-pop
- Length: 3:50
- Label: So Recordings
- Songwriters: Diana Vickers; Miranda Cooper; Simen Eriksrud; Simone Larson
- Producer: Simen Eriksrud

Diana Vickers singles chronology
"My Wicked Heart" (2010)	"Cinderella" (2013)	"Music to Make Boys Cry" (2013)

"Cinderella" is a song by English singer and songwriter Diana Vickers from her second studio album, Music to Make Boys Cry (2013). It was released on 19 July 2013 as the album's lead single.

== Background ==
On 30 June 2011, Vickers revealed on her official Tumblr account that she had parted ways with RCA Records due to creative differences. She went on further to assure her fans that the second album is still proceeding and that she is proud of it. It was uncertain whether Vickers would be signed to a new record label or would release her album independently. On 1 July 2011 it was reported that the mutual separation between Vickers and her management was due to musical direction where Vickers wants to pursue a more indie, less-commercial route. On 13 July 2011 Popjustice reviewed three tracks from Vickers' second album titled, "Boy In Paris", "Cinderella" and "Music To Make The Boys Cry" commenting that the songwriting standard was extremely high and that, "the tunes – the melodies – are huge". The article presented how the three tracks were a result of studio sessions with Donkeyboy and Miranda Cooper. On 9 December 2011 Vickers released a promotional single "Music To Make Boys Cry" for free download on her website. The song boasted a deeper electronic and indie pop sound than her previous work. A week later, "Kiss of a Bullet", a second promotional track, was released free of charge by asking fans to publish a Twitter or Facebook post to gain access to the download. On 8 and 9 February 2012, Vickers showcased material from her second album in a mini-tour at The Ruby Lounge in Manchester and Cargo in Shoreditch, London. Songs confirmed by Vickers were: "Music to Make Boys Cry", "Kiss of a Bullet", "Boy in Paris", "Lightning Strikes", "Love Sounds Better in French", "Dead Heat" and "Smoke". In late 2012 it Vickers announced she was to star in an independent film The Perfect Wave, and had to delay the release of her new album. In early April 2013 it was reported that Diana Vickers had signed a worldwide record deal with independent record label So Recordings, and was preparing to release a new comeback single "Cinderella" in the summer. A few weeks later the full single premiered online, and Vickers said of the song: "'Cinderella' is about being in love and not caring about any of the material things in life, just wanting to be with that one person you adore."

== Music video ==
The official music video premiered on 31 May 2013.

== Critical reception ==
David Deady of Music Scene reviewed the song as: A play on the classic Disney fairy tale, Cinderella speaks of being in love and willing to squander everything for a chance to be with that one person you adore. Vickers powerfully lands her lilting vocals with considerable aplomb on this track, singing that "for you I would lose, both of my shoes" in an effort to stay with her prince. It’s an endearingly syrupy premise for a song and works well with Vickers’ inimitable style. Cinderella is pure happy pop music at its best; it doesn’t feel overproduced and is a breath of fresh air amid the current sea of mediocre offerings. Digital Spy rated the song 4 out of 5 stars, saying it's "proving to be one of those songs where you forget how good the chorus is until it's blasting out of your speakers/headphones/other listening device at that very moment. We're not sure what that means for its eventual chart position, but let's all have another listen to the song now."

== Charts ==
Chart (2013)	Peak position
Scotland Singles (OCC)	68
UK Singles (OCC)	76
UK Indie (OCC)	13

== Release history ==
Region	Date	Format
Ireland	19 July 2013	Digital download
United Kingdom	21 July 2013	Digital download
