= My Sad Captains =

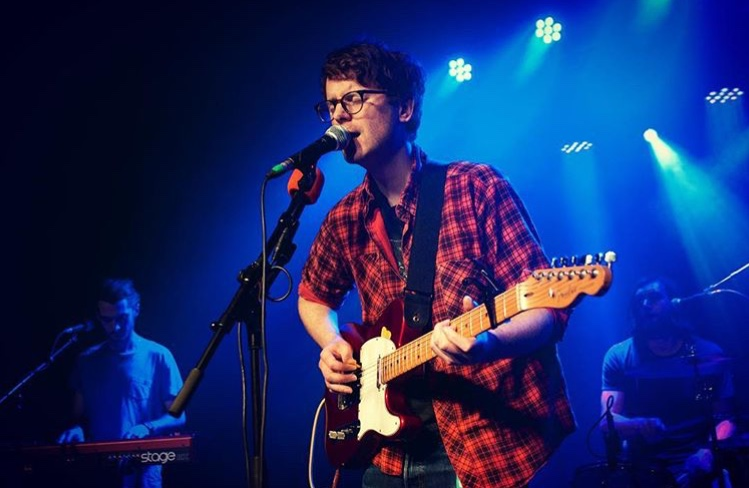
- My Sad Captains live at Oslo, Hackney

Background information
- Origin: London
- Genres: rock, folk
- Years active: 2004–present
- Labels: Stolen Recordings, Bella Union
- Members: Ed Wallis; Leon Dufficy; Ben Walker; Steve Blackwell; Henry Thomas
- Past members: Cathy Lucas; Jack Swayne; Nick Goss; Jim Wallis; Dan Davis
- Website: Official website

My Sad Captains are a British five-piece rock and folk band originally from London, and currently signed to Bella Union. They consist of Ed Wallis (vocals, guitar), Leon Dufficy (guitar), Ben Walker (drums, vocals), Steve Blackwell (bass) and Henry Thomas (keyboards, vocals) have released four albums to date and have toured both Europe and North America. Their most recent record is Sun Bridge, released in October 2017.

== History ==
The band was formed in 2004 by frontman Ed Wallis after his previous outfit, which included Nick Goss, had dissolved, after the two had moved down to London to attend university. Wallis decided to "record a load of songs myself and call it My Sad Captains". He realised that the tracks would work better with a full band set-up and reconnected with Goss, while recruiting Jack Swayne on bass and Ed's brother Jim Wallis on drums. After the band had formed it wasn't 'until a year or so later that we were all living in London and taking it seriously'. The band became a five-piece when Cathy Lucas joined the band on violin, vocals and keyboards. The band decided to concentrate on their material and avoided to release something 'for the sake of it'.

In 2007 they made their debut with a 7" single "Bad Decisions" b/w "Here and Elsewhere" for the Fortuna Pop! label. It was followed by "All Hat and No Plans" b/w "Great Expectations" released at the end of March 2008 through White Heat. Over the course of 2008, the band began recording their debut album with Paul Jones. While the sessions were self-financed, Jones, the co-owner of Stolen Recordings, made them 'an offer we couldn't refuse'. In June 2009, the band released Here & Elsewhere. It was followed in 2011 by Fight Less, Win More on the same label.

They released their third album, Best of Times, on 17 March 2014 through Bella Union. They spent much of the year on tour in support, while videos for the songs "Goodbye" and "Hardly There" appeared.

Their fourth record, Sun Bridge, was released on 6 October 2017, also on Bella Union. It was described by Uncut as "A sumptuous synthesis of epiphanic pop and Krautrock–inflected drift and diffusion… Few British bands since Spiritualized in their '90s imperial phase have been as proficient at inducing a beatific state of drift". The band opened for The Sea and Cake on a UK tour in June 2018; their last live show so far was in October that year.

== Name ==
The band's name comes from a poem by the Anglo-American poet Thom Gunn, Wallis explained that he decided 'to steal someone else's idea rather than think of my own'. He simply liked the poem, but that there was 'no special significance to it'. Wallis discovered the book 'sitting on a shelf unattended, when I was looking for a name, and it seemed to capture some element of the music that I heard in my head'. The phrase itself originates from Shakespeare's Antony and Cleopatra Act III Scene 13:

"Come,
Let's have one other gaudy night: call to me
All my sad captains; fill our bowls once more;
Let's mock the midnight bell."

== Discography ==
=== Albums ===
- Here & Elsewhere (Stolen Recordings, 2009)
- Fight Less, Win More (Stolen Recordings, 2011)
- Best of Times (Bella Union, 2014)
- Sun Bridge (Bella Union, 2017)
