= Tiffany Page =

English singer-songwriter (born 1986)

- Born: Tiffany Page; 16 April 1986 (age 40); Worcester, Worcestershire, England
- Genres: Pop rock, soft rock
- Occupations: Singer-songwriter
- Instruments: Vocals, guitar
- Years active: 2009–present
- Website: http://www.tiffanypage.com

Tiffany Page (born 16 April 1986) is an English singer-songwriter based in London. Her debut single "Walk Away Slow" was released on 15 March 2010. Her second single, "On Your Head", started to receive airplay on radio stations across the UK.

In 2010 she toured with Hole as their supporting artist.

In 2015, a new single, "Suburbia" was released, followed by 2016 releases called "Believer" and "Girls".

In 2017, she teamed up with Nicholas Dagnall and Harry Valentine on their California Indie album for two tracks, entitled "Too Good to Lose" and "Late Night Drive".

== Biography ==
Page was born in England 1986, spent some of her childhood in Zimbabwe before returning to England to live in London in the 1990s. She performed in the London club scene before being signed to Mercury Records in early 2009. She spent early 2010 supporting the Noisettes in London, Brighton, Manchester, Newcastle, Liverpool and Bristol. She posted a cover of Rihanna's song, "Rude Boy" on YouTube.

Page's music is influenced and inspired by grunge and rock artists such as Nirvana, Hole, Babes in Toyland, L7 and Queens of The Stone Age. Previously managed by Sports Entertainment Group, she moved to Crown Talent with Marc Marot in January 2012.

== Music career ==
Page released two singles, the first being "Walk Away Slow", followed by "On Your Head" on 24 May 2010, included on her self-titled début album, which was due for release on 20 September 2010 and created in a promotional format but never actually released. Her songs have been played on national television on shows such as Live from Studio Five and GMTV.

In 2010, she was present at many of that year's festivals including Hard Rock Calling, Tramlines and V Festival.

In 2020, her previously shelved début album, named Walk Away Slow, was released digitally under the label LIBELLULA creativestudios.

== Songs ==
The track listing for the original album (2010) was;

- "Walk Away Slow"
- "Hope He Doesn't Know About You"
- "On Your Head"
- "You Won't"
- "Out of My Mind"
- "Heaven Ain't Easy"
- "7 Years Too Late"
- "Reminders"
- "Police"
- "Break The Chain"
- "Playing With Fire"
- "I Am The Blaze"

These five tunes originated around the same time but did not feature on the album;

- Better Late Than Never
- Something About Him
- Too Drunk
- What They Teach You
- Roam

These were due to feature on the second album (2012)

- Painkiller
- 9 Bar

The 2016 release of "Girls" also contained a B-side track called "Worse Without You".

Page has also covered versions of three other songs including "Rude Boy" (Rihanna), "Girls Just Wanna Have Fun" (Cyndi Lauper) and "Supermassive Black Hole" (Muse).
