= The Boy Who Murdered Love =

Single by Diana Vickers

from the album Songs from the Tainted Cherry Tree
- B-side: "Once" (Radio 1 Live Lounge); "Just Say Yes" (Radio 1 Live Lounge)"; "Cold Kiss"
- Released: 18 July 2010
- Recorded: 2009
- Genre: Pop
- Length: 3:21
- Label: RCA
- Songwriters: Diana Vickers; Chris Braide
- Producer: Chris Braide

Diana Vickers singles chronology
"Once" (2010)	"The Boy Who Murdered Love" (2010)	"My Wicked Heart" (2010)

"The Boy Who Murdered Love" is a song by English singer and songwriter Diana Vickers from her debut studio album, Songs from the Tainted Cherry Tree (2010). It was written by Vickers and the song's producer Chris Braide. The song was released as the album's second and final single as a digital download on 18 July 2010 with the CD single released the next day. A demo of the song has surfaced online after accidentally being uploaded to Vickers's Myspace page where it remains.

== Background ==
The title phrase and "Shot, shot, shot, shot, shot like a bullet" hook together helped form a song skeleton that Braide developed further with Vickers at a writing session in Braide's studio.

== Critical reception ==
"The Boy Who Murdered Love" has received positive reviews from critics. Robert Copsey from Digital Spy wrote that "It all adds up to a smart, sophisticated pop tune carried off with enough conviction to discourage any future bad boys hoping to give her the runaround." Fraser McAlpine from BBC Radio 1 gave the song four stars out of five, saying "I'm just saying there's room for improvement. Constructive criticism, y'see. And on the plus side, well what a lovely chorus you've made. It really is a wondrous thing, because at the beginning it is all jabby and urgent and angry, and at the end it becomes floaty and mournful. That's very good indeed, especially coming after the purring verses. So well done there."

== Music video ==
The music video for "The Boy Who Murdered Love" premiered on MSN on 3 June 2010. It features Vickers in a house reflecting over her boyfriend, who has recently broken her heart. Throughout the video, various cartoon images appear, including lips, hearts, water and arrows. Cartoon text is also seen to accompany the lyrics "pain", "hurt" and "love". During the chorus of the song, Vickers re-enacts the metaphorical "put the arrow in my back" lyrics through the use of a cartoon bow and arrows.

== Promotion ==
Vickers began promotion for "The Boy Who Murdered Love" on the week beginning 12 July 2010. She appeared as a guest on 14 July 2010 on BBC Radio 1's The Chris Moyles Show as well as The Five O'Clock Show, which was hosted by Fern Britton. Vickers also performed the song on The Graham Norton Show and as part of her performance at T4 On The Beach on 4 July 2010, in which she performed on both stages, filling in for Faithless who were unable to attend the festival. Vickers also performed the single at T in the Park 2010, in which she appeared on King Tut's Wah Wah Tent in the morning on 10 July 2010. She appeared on Loose Women on 22 July 2010 and Magic Numbers on 24 July 2010. Vickers' also did a Hot Desk Interview for ITV2 around the time of release of The Boy Who Murdered Love.

== Track listings ==
CD single
No.	Title	Length
1.	"The Boy Who Murdered Love"	3:21
2.	"Once" (Radio 1 Live Lounge)	3:00
3.	"Just Say Yes" (Radio 1 Live Lounge)	4:13
4.	"Cold Kiss" (demo)	3:17

iTunes
No.	Title	Length
1.	"The Boy Who Murdered Love" (Guena LG Remix aka Glam As You Radio Edit)	3:32

== Charts ==
Chart (2010)	Peak position
Scotland Singles (OCC)	28
South Korea International Chart (Gaon)	16
UK Singles (OCC)	36

== Release history ==
Region	Date	Format	Label
Ireland	16 July 2010	Digital download	RCA
United Kingdom	18 July 2010	Digital download	RCA
United Kingdom	19 July 2010	CD single	RCA
