= Best of Times (album) =

Studio album by My Sad Captains
- Released: 17 March 2014
- Recorded: Bella Union Studios, Hackney, London
- Genres: Rock, folk
- Length: 45:00
- Label: Bella Union
- Producer: My Sad Captains

My Sad Captains chronology
Fight Less, Win More (2011)	Best of Times (2014)	Sun Bridge (2017)

Best of Times is the third studio album released by the English band My Sad Captains on 17 March 2014 through Bella Union Records. The album was recorded in London and mixed by Larry Crane in Portland (OR). A single, 'Goodbye' was released on 29 January with a video directed by Dan Davis featuring Vincent Meehan (aka Lavinia Co-op).

== Reception ==
Professional ratings
Aggregate scores
Source	Rating
AnyDecentMusic?	6.4/10
Metacritic	65/100
Review scores
Source	Rating
Drowned in Sound	8/10
The Line of Best Fit	7/10
musicOMH	3/5 stars
NME	3/5 stars
Record Collector	3/5 stars

Best of Times received mixed reviews from critics. On Metacritic, the album holds a score of 65/100 based on 9 reviews, indicating "generally favorable reviews".

== Track listing ==
All tracks are written by Ed Wallis.

No.	Title	Length
1.	"Goodbye"	4:34
2.	"Wide Open"	4:50
3.	"In Time"	7:03
4.	"All Times Into One"	5:34
5.	"Extra Curricular"	5:27
6.	"All In Your Mind"	3:03
7.	"Hardly There"	6:04
8.	"Keeping On, Keeping On"	3:40
9.	"Familiar Ghosts"	5:37
