= Diana Vickers =

English singer-songwriter, actress and fashion designer

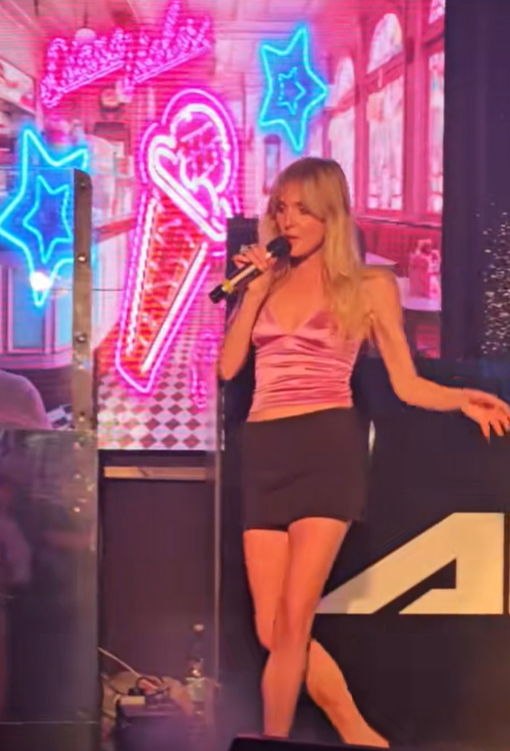
- Vickers performing during Manchester Pride in August 2025

Background information
- Born: Diana Vickers; 30 July 1991 (age 35)
- Origin: Accrington, Lancashire, England
- Genres: Indie pop, indie rock, folktronica, folk pop, new wave, synthpop
- Occupations: Singer; songwriter; actress
- Instruments: Vocals; acoustic guitar
- Years active: 2008–present
- Labels: RCA; So Recordings

Diana Vickers (born 30 July 1991) is an English singer, songwriter and actress. She was a semi-finalist on The X Factor in 2008, being the ninth contestant eliminated finishing in fourth place. Vickers signed a record deal with RCA Records and, after touring with her fellow contestants from The X Factor, played the title role in a West End revival of The Rise and Fall of Little Voice.

Vickers' 2010 debut single, "Once", charted at number one on the UK Singles Chart and her debut album, Songs from the Tainted Cherry Tree, achieved number-one status on the UK Albums Chart. Her follow-up singles, "The Boy Who Murdered Love" and "My Wicked Heart", reached the top 40 and top 20 respectively. Vickers' second album, Music to Make Boys Cry, followed in 2013, accompanied by the singles "Cinderella" and "Music to Make Boys Cry". In 2025, Vickers returned to music following a 12-year break with the single "Ice Cream".

Vickers unveiled her debut fashion line in 2011, and her boho-chic approach to fashion has received praise from British fashion media. She made her film debut in The Perfect Wave and her television acting debut in the comedy series Give Out Girls, both of which premiered in 2014.

== Early life ==
Vickers was born in Blackburn, Lancashire, England, and grew up in Huncoat, near Accrington, along with her younger sister Charlotte. She studied for A Levels in Theatre Studies, Classics and Psychology at Westholme School in Blackburn. Vickers has been singing since the age of 11, taking singing lessons and participating in local competitions, but did not sing professionally before adulthood.

== Music career ==
=== 2008–2009: The X Factor ===
In 2008 Vickers auditioned for the fifth series of The X Factor, singing "The Blower's Daughter" by Damien Rice, after which Louis Walsh commented that she resembled a "little hippie". Vickers was selected for the live shows and was mentored by Cheryl Cole in the girls' category alongside Alexandra Burke and Laura White.

Vickers regularly performed barefoot on The X Factor, a practice she continued into her later professional career. Her live show performances attracted both praise and criticism, gaining attention for her on-stage hand gestures, which earned her the nickname "The Claw".

On her first live show, Vickers sang U2's "With or Without You" and in her second live show Michael Jackson's "Man in the Mirror", for which she received praise from Dannii Minogue, describing it as "box fresh", with Simon Cowell remarking she was "the one to beat". The following week Vickers performed Charlie Chaplin's "Smile" and in week four Blondie's "Call Me", which again received praise from the judges. In week five of the live show stages, Vickers did not perform due to a bout of laryngitis. She had wanted to perform the Mariah Carey song "Always Be My Baby", but her doctor advised her not to, saying Vickers could do permanent damage to her vocal cords. This was the first time on the show that the producers had excused any act from performing.

In week six, Vickers returned to the programme performing Coldplay's "Yellow", which received a negative reaction from the judges; Dannii Minogue commented that she didn’t "love the song choice", while Cowell suggested Vickers was still not well enough to perform. In week seven, Vickers performed Take That's "Patience" commenting that she now felt 100%.

In the semi-final of the competition, Vickers performed Avril Lavigne's "Girlfriend" as her first song and received positive comments from the judges, including Cheryl Cole's comment that "she had got that sparkle back". Vickers followed this with Dido's "White Flag" but was voted out of the competition. She performed a reprise of "White Flag", where her fellow singers joined her on stage in a memorably emotional moment. She became the ninth contestant eliminated overall. Following the end of the series, she went on tour with the rest of the top eight contestants on The X Factor Live tour between February and March 2009.

=== 2009–2010: Record deal and Songs from the Tainted Cherry Tree ===
Vickers signed to Sony Music's RCA Records. She began work on her debut album in January 2009, commenting that it would not be rushed and that it would be "Diana style". She worked with Cathy Dennis, Eg White, Nerina Pallot, Ellie Goulding, Guy Sigsworth, Chris Braide, Savan Kotecha, Starsmith, Patrick Wolf, and Dev Hynes.

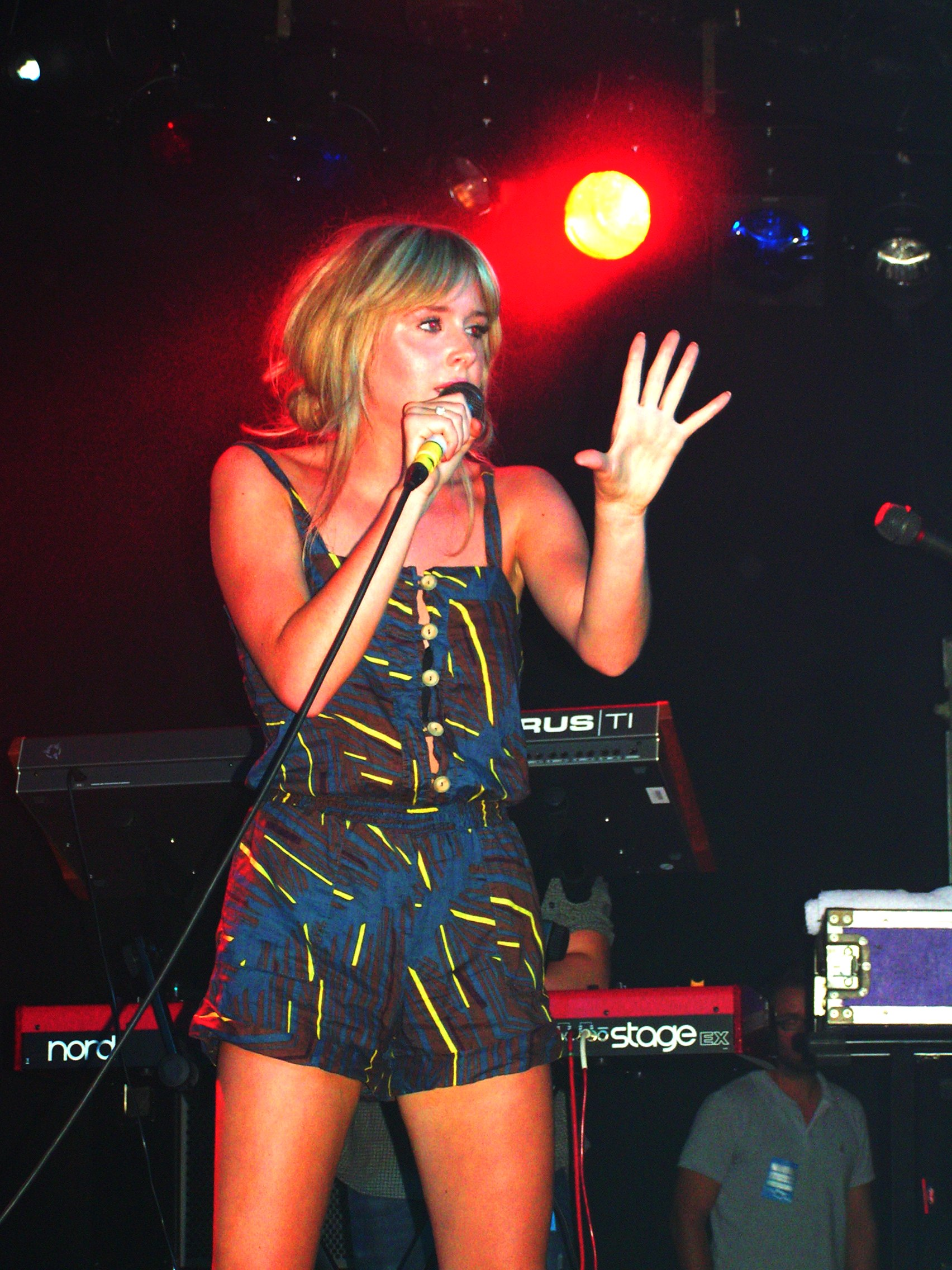
Vickers performing live in 2010

In March 2010, Vickers' embarked on a tour in support of the release of her debut album, Songs from the Tainted Cherry Tree, which charted at number one on the UK Albums Chart. Songs from the Tainted Cherry Tree has since been certified gold by the BPI for sales of 100,000 copies. Vickers' debut single, "Once", was written by Cathy Dennis and Eg White and produced by Mike Spencer. The track was released in the United Kingdom in April 2010, and playlisted on Radio 1, where Vickers performed an acoustic version of "Once" and a cover of Snow Patrol's "Just Say Yes" for the Live Lounge. "Once" entered the UK Singles Chart at number one. "The Boy Who Murdered Love", written and produced by Chris Braide (with lyric contribution from Vickers), was released as the second single and charted at number 36 in the UK. During mid 2010, Vickers performed at numerous music festivals such as the Freedom Festival, iTunes Festival, Oxygen Festival, Radio 1's Big Weekend, Summer Sundae, T in the Park, T4 on the Beach, and V Festival. Vickers also supported Mika at the Eden Sessions in June 2010.

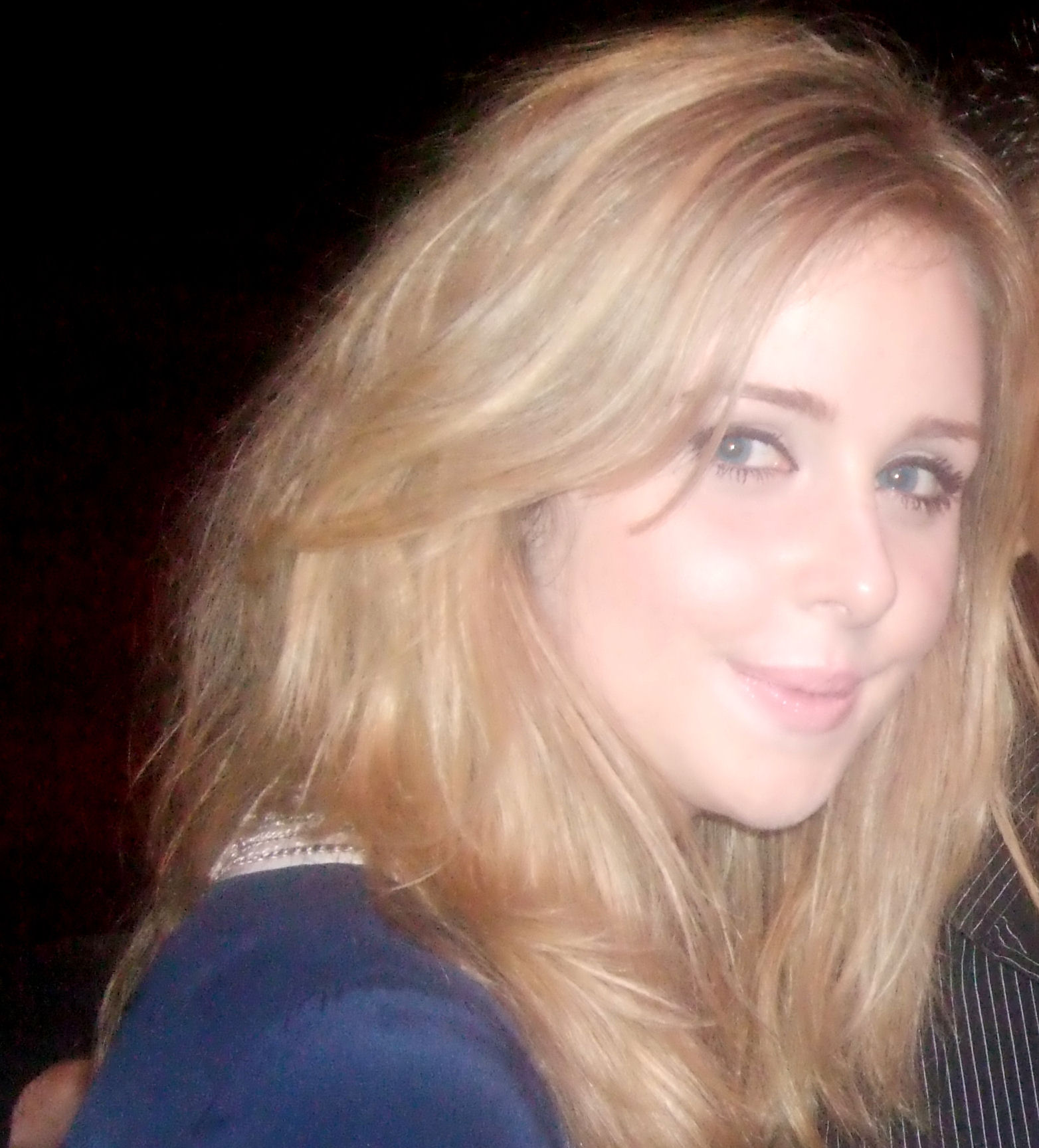
Vickers photographed in 2010

Vickers' third single was a previously unheard track titled "My Wicked Heart", co-written by Vickers and producers Dee Adams and James Earp, which features Vickers playing the trumpet. The single was released in October 2010 and reached number 13 in the UK; the same month, it was reported that Red Hot Chili Peppers was considering legal action over similarities between the chorus of the band's well-known song "Under the Bridge" and "My Wicked Heart". Vickers said in an interview that she had been listening to "Under the Bridge" shortly before working on "My Wicked Heart" and had noticed but decided to ignore the similarities. In an interview to promote the single, Vickers announced the possibility of Songs from the Tainted Cherry Tree getting a solely digital download re-release, and also stated, "I've been writing so much and got so many tracks under my belt. I think I'm very close to ready for the second album actually." The fourth leg of the Songs from the Tainted Cherry Tree Tour began in November 2010 and included dates in Ireland as well as the UK. At the end of 2010, Vickers became RCA's highest grossing domestic artist.

=== 2011–2015: Music to Make Boys Cry and side projects ===
In June 2010, Vickers announced that she had started preparing songs for a second album. She co-wrote material with musicians such as Nerina Pallot, Eg White, Starsmith, Chris Braide, and Dee Adam. In January 2011, Vickers travelled to Los Angeles, United States, to co-write material with John Shanks and Diane Warren, and played her debut USA gig at Cherry Pop in West Hollywood (promoted via Perez Hilton).

Vickers co-wrote the 2011 Enrique Iglesias and Jennifer Lopez single "Mouth 2 Mouth" for Iglesias's reissue album Euphoria Reloaded.

In June 2011, Vickers revealed on her official Tumblr account that she had parted company with RCA Records due to creative differences. It was later reported that her departure was due to wanting to pursue a more indie, less commercial route, coupled with a breakdown in her professional relationship with Sony Music due to the departure from RCA Records of Craig Logan, who had originally signed Vickers to the label. In October 2011, Vickers performed at the Super League Grand Final at Old Trafford. Vickers released two new tracks, "Music to Make Boys Cry" and "Kiss of a Bullet", for free download online in December 2011. In February 2012, she showcased material from her second album in a mini-tour at The Ruby Lounge in Manchester and Cargo in Shoreditch, London. She signed a worldwide record deal with So Recordings in early 2013.

Vickers' second album, Music to Make Boys Cry, was released in September 2013, later than anticipated due to Vickers starring in an independent film titled The Perfect Wave. The album charted at number 37 on the UK Albums Chart and reached the top ten on the UK Indie Chart. The lead single, "Cinderella", was released in July 2013 and charted in the top 20 of the UK Indie Chart; the second single, "Music to Make Boys Cry", coincided with the album's release in September. Vickers promoted the album during the 2013 music festival season with appearances at Festival Too, Liverpool International Music Festival, T in the Park, and V Festival; for some of these performances she opened for fellow The X Factor alumnus Olly Murs. The third single from Music to Make Boys Cry, "Mad at Me", was released in December.

In 2013, Vickers appeared as the lead in a music video for the single "Derail" by Leeds rock band Dinosaur Pile-Up. In the music video, Vickers plays the part of a kidnapped girl who subsequently kills a man in the shower after the kidnapping. The same year, Vickers was featured singing on the One Direction television advertisement for the launch of their debut fragrance, Our Moment. Vickers sings a cover of "My Favourite Things", a song from the musical The Sound of Music. She released the song "Chains", in August 2015, which was used to promote the film Awaiting.

=== 2020–present: Dial M for Murder, podcasts and return to music ===
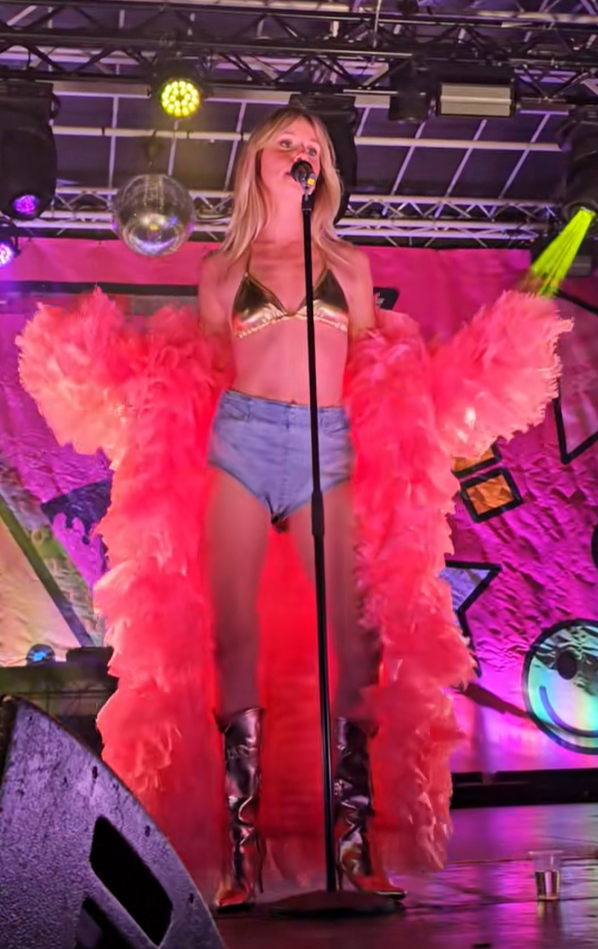
Vickers performing during Manchester Pride in 2025

In 2021, Vickers performed in a theatrical tour of Dial M for Murder.

As of 2022, Vickers hosts Ki & Dee: The Podcast alongside Kiara Hunter.

From January 2023, Vickers starred as Shelby in a production of Steel Magnolias at the Richmond Theatre, London. Vickers appeared alongside Laura Main, Lucy Speed, Caroline Harker and Elizabeth Ayodele. The production, going on to tour the UK, was rated 2/5 stars by What's on Stage. In July 2025, Vickers appeared in Not Going Out, a comedy programme on BBC One.

In August 2025, Vickers made a return to music with a comeback single titled, "Ice Cream". Produced and co-written by Dee Adams who also produced, "My Wicked Heart" and James Earp, "Ice Cream" has been described as a, "deliciously addictive pop gem that pairs Vickers' gorgeous vocals with an upbeat electro-pop production with lush swirls, sass and synths, nodding to Vickers' early hits while winking knowingly at the queer dance floor." "Ice Cream" was released on 22 August 2025 for digital download and streaming and was first performed live at Manchester Pride on 23 August 2025.

== Artistry ==
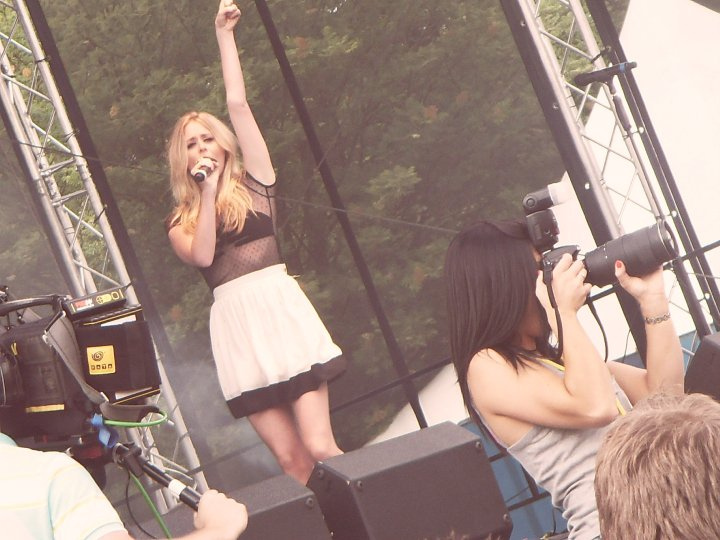
Vickers performing live in 2010

Vickers' musical style includes simple folk-tinged, keyboard and guitar based ballads to more up-tempo indie rock and synth-based songs with full band backing. Her musical style has been compared to Kate Bush, Ellie Goulding, Dido, and Dolores O'Riordan. Vickers additionally showcases an idiosyncratic style of singing described as breathy, raspy and hiccupy. Vickers has cited an array of influences including Florence + The Machine, Kate Bush, Regina Spektor, Kings of Leon, Frou Frou, Sinéad O'Connor and The Sundays. Vickers commented on her musical style and debut album, Songs from the Tainted Cherry Tree (2010), saying:

Right from the start they [RCA Records] were interested in the fact that I wrote lyrics, I could play more than one instrument and that I wanted to make a record that could have only been made by me. It was important with me to be completely open with co-writers.

For her album Music to Make the Boys Cry (2013), Vickers initially described her new musical direction as "sexy", "adventurous" and influenced by indie and rock music, citing the works of The xx, The Doors, Siouxsie and the Banshees, and Björk. Later she described the album as "Kylie-esque" and inspired by 1980s acts including Blondie, Cyndi Lauper, and Madonna, saying she had "got to the core of who I am as an artist [...] [my music is] more mature and sophisticated and feels like there’s more of a structure and consistent vibe to it".

== Other ventures ==
=== Acting career ===
This young girl is a natural actress. The moment she read the part, it was magic. A frisson ran through the room. Diana Vickers is the real deal. She is Little Voice.

— Jim Cartwright on Vickers

Vickers made her professional acting debut in the title role of a newly revived West End production of Jim Cartwright's The Rise and Fall of Little Voice in October 2009 at the Vaudeville Theatre, on The Strand, London. She played Little Voice, impersonating singers such as Shirley Bassey, Edith Piaf and Judy Garland. Mark Owen of Take That wrote "Sunlight", the final song in the play for Vickers to sing. "Sunlight" was featured as a B-side for her debut single, "Once".

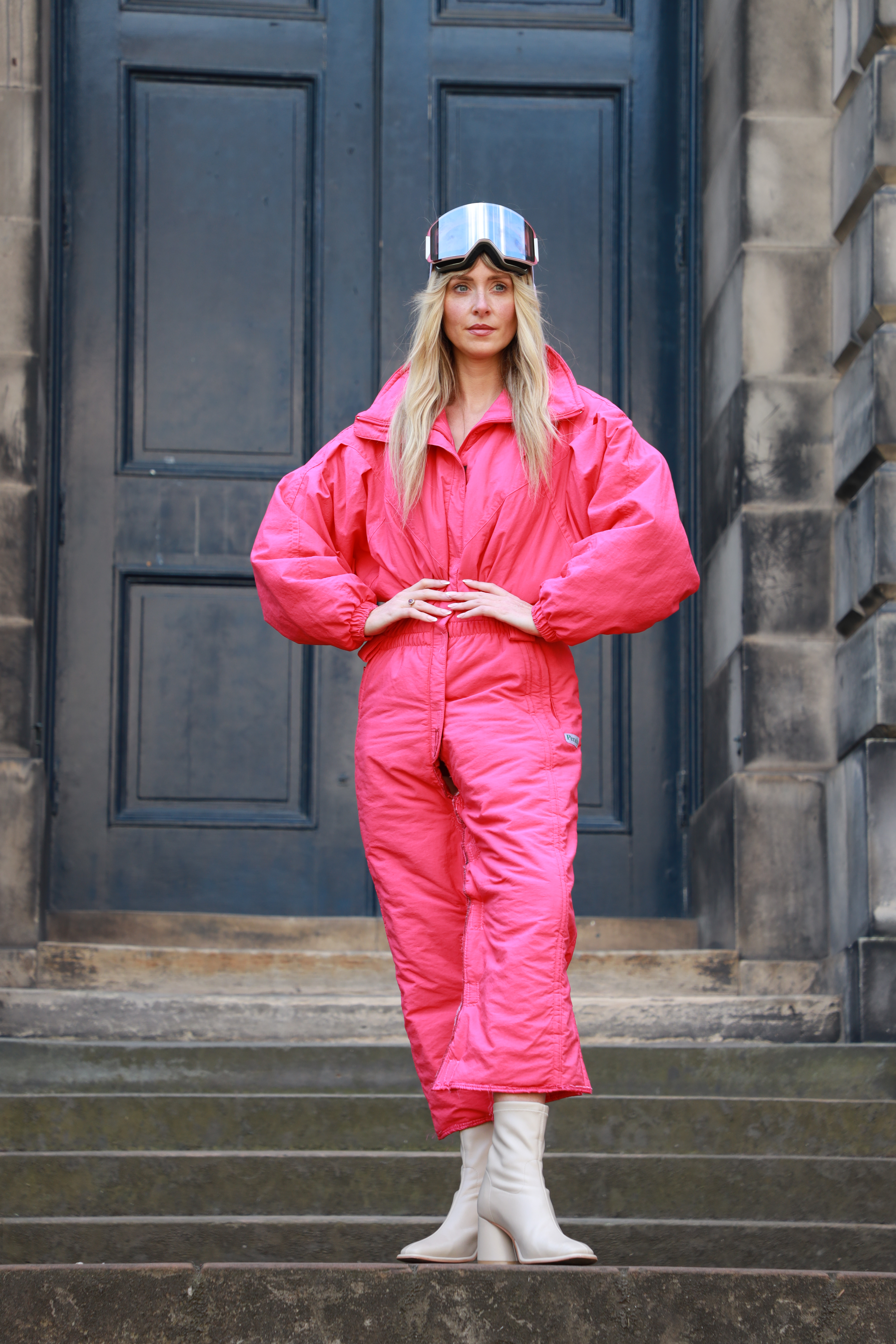
Vickers at the 2024 Edinburgh Festival Fringe for I Wish You Well

Vickers took a break from recording her debut album to star in the production. Her performance received a positive review in The Guardian in which they said that "[Vickers'] singing is impressive, we were surprised at her vocal abilities." Her stint was deemed "magical" in The Daily Telegraph. She won the Whatsonstage.com Theatregoers' Choice Award "London Newcomer of the Year" in February 2010 for her performance, with 34.5% of the vote out of 7 other competitors.

In 2012, it was announced that Vickers had landed her debut film role alongside Clint Eastwood's son in the independent film The Perfect Wave. Vickers stated, "It's a lot about surfing and it's to do with the power of life and death. It's quite interesting. I'm going to learn how to surf." Vickers travelled to Cape Town, South Africa, for the shoot, putting the release of her second album on hold. The film was released in 2014.

In 2013, Sky Living confirmed that Vickers had signed to appear in a six-part comedy series titled Give Out Girls, which marks Vickers' debut in television acting. The series follows the endeavours and lives of a group of promotions girls. Vickers plays Gemma, the youngest of the group, who is bright and enthusiastic with a naive view of the world. The series filmed in Manchester and is distributed internationally by BBC Worldwide. It premiered on Comedy Central in October 2014.

From December 2013, Vickers played the role of Holly in the West End play The Duck House by Dan Patterson and Colin Swash, starring alongside Ben Miller, Nancy Carroll and Simon Shepherd. The show is a farcical political satire based on the 2009 UK parliamentary expenses scandal.

Vickers played the lead role of Lauren in the 2015 film Awaiting.

In 2016, Vickers played Nikki in the feature film To Dream.

In October 2017, Vickers played a version of herself in Josh Widdicombe's comedy series, Josh.

She starred alongside Shane Richie and the Olivier award-winning Sara Crowe in the 2019 tour production of The Entertainer by John Osbourne

From 2021 to 2022, Vickers starred in a production tour of Frederick Knott's show of Dial M for Murder, playing the role of Sheila.

=== Fashion ===
Vickers' fashion sense has been described as boho-chic and hippie-influenced. Her fashion style includes vintage inspired clothing. Vickers' fashion icons are Brigitte Bardot and Marilyn Monroe. In October 2009, she was awarded "Fashionista of the Week" in The Guardian. Vickers' approach to fashion has received praise from Grazia, and Look.

In September 2011, Vickers was the face of Collection 2000's autumn and winter make-up line.

=== Philanthropy ===
In March 2010, Vickers supported JLS for a charity performance in aid of Teenage Cancer Trust at the Royal Albert Hall in London to raise money for teenagers who are suffering from cancer. In July 2010, Vickers performed at a charity event "Give Tilly a Hand", helping to raise funds in a charity evening for meningitis victim Tilly Lockley. In September 2010, Vickers played an intimate gig as part of the month-long Oxjam Festival, which raised money in support of charity Oxfam.

In March 2011, Vickers launched an eBay competition on behalf of Comic Relief, which encouraged people to bid to become Vickers' Twitter "best friend".

== Discography ==
- Songs from the Tainted Cherry Tree (2010)
- Music to Make Boys Cry (2013)

== Filmography ==
=== Film ===
Year	Title	Role
2014	The Perfect Wave	Kim
2015	Awaiting	Lauren
2016	To Dream	Nikki

=== Television ===
Year	Title	Role	Notes
2008	The X Factor	Contestant	Series 5
2014	Give Out Girls	Gemma	Main role
2015	Top Coppers	Chris	Main role
2017	Josh	Herself	Episode: "Fame & Fortune"
2025	Not Going Out	Ava	Episode: "Hotel Room"

== See also ==
- List of The X Factor finalists (UK series 5)
