= My Wicked Heart =

2010 single by Diana Vickers

Single by Diana Vickers
- B-side: "The Way You Say It"
- Released: 17 October 2010
- Recorded: 2010
- Genre: New Jack Swing
- Length: 2:56
- Label: RCA
- Songwriter(s): Diana Vickers; Dee Adam James Earp
- Producer(s): Dee Adam; James Earp

Diana Vickers singles chronology
"The Boy Who Murdered Love" (2010)	"My Wicked Heart" (2010)	"Cinderella" (2013)

"My Wicked Heart" is a song co-written and co-produced by English singer Diana Vickers. It was digitally released on 17 October 2010 and physically released on 1 November 2010 by RCA Records in the United Kingdom. The track was inspired by indie music including The xx and The Doors and features Vickers playing the trumpet. Vickers performed the single live on the seventh series of The X Factor on 17 October 2010. "My Wicked Heart" received commercial success peaking at number 13 on the UK Singles Chart making it Vickers' second top 20 single. The single is not included on an album due to Vickers leaving the label it was recorded under.

== Background ==
On 2 September 2010, various media outlets reported that Vickers was due to re-release her debut album, under a deluxe edition with extra material. Following this announcement, Vickers stated her new single would be called "My Wicked Heart", a video containing a short snippet of the song was uploaded to YouTube. On 12 September, BBC Radio 1 premiered the track, it received mainly positive reviews due to its upbeat tempo. Popjustice even commented, praising it on the middle eight segment; "It is a little bit bonkers and quite a lot amazing." On 2 October, the following month, Vickers unveiled the video for the single, and it premiered on ITV2 at 6:55 PM.

== Critical reception ==
Professional ratings
Review scores
Source	Rating
BBC Radio 1	4/5 stars
Digital Spy	5/5 stars

Popjustice gave the single a positive review commenting that it resembled, "Florence + The Machine doing "Under the Bridge" via "Crazy Chick" with some big brassy other things thrown in. However, the video did receive some criticism, as in the video there is a scene where Vickers is dressed in a cheetah-style costume, dancing in a cage and this was said to be copying a scene from Shakira's "She Wolf" video. It is a little bit bonkers and quite a lot amazing.[...] It opens with the line 'hush hush stay quiet, your secret's safe with me'. There is a great 'whoops-a-daisy' bit in the middle eight.

Sugarscape.com stated that they were impressed with Vickers new totally diva-esque new song. Where it takes her to a whole new level of cool, showing the claw is well and truly banished and behind her. Mayer Nissim of Digital Spy stated that the song was "smart-but-not-too-clever" and goes on to say "Vickers and her collaborators tease with stop-start verses and heart murmur drums before smashing our ears right through in a kitchen-sink volley of brass, deranged whoops and a blatant-but-brilliant steal from the Red Hot Chili Peppers' 'Under The Bridge'." They also stated that "After a welcome second helping, they take it right back down for a breakdown whose berserk "Whoops-a-daisy" refrain will make the existing Marmite split over her voice look like a happy coalition - all in less than three poptastic minutes." And then went on to reward the track with five out of five stars. Coffee City Music Lounge stated that they liked the song as it is quite different, they went on to say that they liked the beat and he/she likes the 'horns' on the track. "My Wicked Heart" is quirky and fits in with the other tracks on the album.[...] He also said "It’s an odd mix of quirky and creepy, which I like."

== Chart performance ==
Upon release, the single steadily climbed up the iTunes chart; although the performance on The X Factor caused it to jump to a peak of number 12. After being predicted to debut at number 12 by BBC Radio 1's Chart Update, the song debuted at number 13 on 23 October 2010 on downloads alone; marking Vickers' second top 20 single and third top 40 hit. The following week, the single fell 18 places to number 31. The physical copy was released that week. On 6 November, the single fell yet again to number 46 and then a week later fell a further 33 places to number 79; marking its fourth week within the top 100.

== Music video ==
=== Background ===
Vickers in a frame from the video of "My Wicked Heart"

The "My Wicked Heart" music video premiered on ITV2 at 6.55 PM on 2 October 2010. The video was directed by Sarah Chatfield, with producer Tamsin Glasson. The production company was Colonel Blimp. The art director and stylist were Shaun Fenn and Cynthia Lawrence-John. The choreography of the music video was David Leighton, and the credits for Vickers' hair and make-up was Brendan Robertson. Within the video Vickers is seen as the lead actress in the circus. She is later seen with a clown's outfit on surrounded by blue, green and white balloons. Going on through the video, she is seen doing a similar scene to Shakira's, "She Wolf" where she is in a cage, pulling herself against the cage bars. She is later seen dressed like Liza Minnelli's Cabaret outfit.

=== Synopsis ===
Vickers is seen clad in a pink leotard and cuffed on to a magician's Wheel of Death with a couple of daggers precariously embedded in the board beside her.

== Controversy ==
On 16 October 2010, it was reported that Warner Music Group was considering legal action over similarities between the chorus of "My Wicked Heart" and the Red Hot Chili Peppers song "Under the Bridge". Red Hot Chili peppers themselves also considered an infringement lawsuit. Vickers stated she had listened to "Under the Bridge" shortly before writing the vocal line for "My Wicked Heart", and admitted that she had noticed the resemblance but decided against changing it. Vickers defended this decision stating it is only a "tiny snippet with different chords" and later admitted that she thought that she would “sort of get away with it.” No formal legal action or lawsuit was ever brought forward.

== Promotion ==
Vickers performed the single live as her homecoming performance on The X Factor, Series 7, Week 2. Vickers also performed on This Morning on 19 October and gave an interview on Live from Studio Five on 22 October, as well as her video appearing on Freshly Squeezed on 18 October. She performed on The Alan Titchmarsh Show on 2 November. Vickers embarked on a radio tour of the UK leading up to the release of the single.

== Track listings ==
- CD single
1. "My Wicked Heart" – 2:56 (Vickers, Adams)
2. "The Way You Say It (Demo)" (Vickers, Chris Braide)
3. "My Wicked Heart (Gareth Wyn Remix)"
4. "My Wicked Heart (Blackbox Remix)"
- Digital 2-track single
1. "My Wicked Heart" – 2:56
2. "My Wicked Heart" (Campfire Acoustic Version) – 3:43

== Charts ==
Chart (2010)	Peak position
Europe (European Hot 100 Singles)	42
Ireland (IRMA)	22
Scotland (OCC)	12
UK Singles (OCC)	13

== Release history ==
Region	Release	Format
Ireland	17 October 2010	Digital download
United Kingdom	17 October 2010	Digital download
United Kingdom	1 November 2010	CD single
