= Music to Make Boys Cry (song) =

Single by Diana Vickers

from the album Music to Make Boys Cry
- Released: 15 September 2013
- Recorded: 2011
- Genre: Synth-pop
- Length: 3:50
- Label: So Recordings
- Songwriters: Diana Vickers; Miranda Cooper; Simen Eriksrud; Simone Larson
- Producer: Simen Eriksrud

Diana Vickers singles chronology
"Cinderella" (2013)	"Music to Make Boys Cry" (2013)	"Ice Cream" (2025)

"Music to Make Boys Cry" is a song by English singer and songwriter Diana Vickers from her second studio album of the same name (2013). It was released on 15 September 2013 as the album's second and final single.

== Background ==
On 9 December 2011, Vickers released a promotional demo version of "Music to Make Boys Cry" for free download on her website. Its desire to make you both cry and dance simultaneously is no accident according to Vickers. She explains the concept actually came about because she was on an airplane and saw the phrase "music to make boys cry" in a newspaper article and got really excited and wanted to make a song that had that included. This inspired her to team up with Miranda Cooper and Donkeyboy in a writing session in Norway to co-write the single.

== Music video ==
The official music video premiered on 5 August 2013 on Vickers' YouTube account. The video clip sees Vickers prepare for a party at her apartment, including baking a cake and laying in a bath of balloons. She looks into her mirror and sees all of her party guests behind her. The camera cuts away to reveal that Vickers is actually hosting a party on her own with no guests.

== Critical reception ==
Robert Copsey of Digital Spy awarded the single 4 stars out of 5, praising it as a "slice of twinkly '80s pop that generates a feeling of warmth and fuzziness inside that few could pull off without sounding trite." Popjustice were highly complimentary of the single stating, "However you look at it she [Diana Vickers] is basically one of the Top 100 things about the current pop era and this song, is a tune of such epic proportions that you should hold onto something when you press play below in case the world shifts slightly off its axis, is one we've been listening to LOADS."

== Charts ==
Chart (2013)	Peak position
UK Indie (Official Charts)	44

== Release history ==
Region	Date	Format	Label
United Kingdom	15 September 2013	Digital download	So Recordings
Ireland	15 September 2013	Digital download	So Recordings
