= Once (Diana Vickers song) =

2010 single by Diana Vickers

Single by Diana Vickers

from the album Songs from the Tainted Cherry Tree
- B-side: "Sunlight"; "Jumping into Rivers" (Frou Frou central mix); "Four Leaf Clover" (acoustic)
- Released: 16 April 2010
- Genre: Electropop
- Length: 3:11
- Label: RCA
- Songwriters: Cathy Dennis; Eg White
- Producer: Mike Spencer

Diana Vickers singles chronology
"Once" (2010)	"The Boy Who Murdered Love" (2010)

Audio sample
- file; help

"Once" is a song by English singer and songwriter Diana Vickers, written by Cathy Dennis and Eg White for Vickers' debut studio album, Songs from the Tainted Cherry Tree (2010). "Once" was produced and mixed by Mike Spencer and released as the album's lead single and Vickers' debut single on 16 April 2010. It reached number one on the UK Singles Chart, making it Vickers' most successful single release to date.

== Release ==
"Once" was given its first play on the Big Top 40 as part of the New Year's Eve special in 2009. It later premiered on BBC Radio 1's Switch show on 31 January 2010. The song was A-listed on MTV and Radio 1's playlist. The song "Sunlight", which Vickers performed during her stint in the West End as Little Voice featured on the single as a B-side.

== Critical reception ==
Professional ratings
Review scores
Source	Rating
Digital Spy	5/5 stars
Virgin Music	5/5 stars
Radio 1	3/5 stars

Nick Levine of Digital Spy gave the song a positive review stating: If her pop career doesn't take off, Diana Vickers can always write a book called How Not To Do Things The Simon Cowell Way. Instead of taking the Syco lucre after finishing fourth on The X Factor back in '08, she signed to RCA - yes, we know it's part of the same label group - lined up a genuinely intriguing cast of collaborators for her debut album (Ellie Goulding, Lightspeed Champion, Guy Sigsworth), and even took time out to star in the West End revival of Little Voice. Leon Jackson, watch and weep. Said album promises all manner of offbeat pop treats, but this debut single is a straight up brain-invader - well, what else would you expect from an Eg White/Cathy Dennis co-write? To be a little more precise, 'Once' is an electro-pop-rock monster whose key lyrical idea - "I'm only gonna let you kill me once" - could probably send Eoghan Quigg cross-eyed. Vickers's hiccupy yelp still won't be to all tastes, but there's no denying that the huge, guitar-powered chorus is as hard to ignore as... well... her trademark hand gesture..

Popjustice additionally gave "Once" a positive review for Vickers' debut single commenting: We were fans of Diana throughout the 2008 X Factor run so it was something of a relief when, after all that, 'Once' turned out to be the sort of song you can point at and go "THAT, ladies and gentlemen, is not only a very good pop song but a very good song regardless of genre", which is in itself just as well because while it's obviously a big pop song 'Once' is more than just pop - a debut single that sounds odd and instantly familiar, fragile and bold at the same time.

== Chart performance ==
The single first entered the Irish Singles Chart on 22 April 2010 at its peak of number 3. The following week the single fell 5 places to number 8 before climbing to number 6 on its third week in the chart. On 25 April 2010, "Once" debuted on the UK Singles Chart at number 1 selling 58,385 copies in the first week of release. In its second week in the chart, the single fell 3 places to number 4, being replaced at number 1 by Roll Deep's "Good Times". "Once" has sold over 204,000 copies in the UK. The song debuted at number 5 in the European Hot 100 Singles and in late May 2010, "Once" was added to radio playlists in New Zealand and Australia, peaking at number 61 on the ARIA Singles Chart.

== Music video ==
The video for the song was filmed in London on 7 February 2010. It was directed by Harvey Brown. It shows Vickers in various places and wearing different costumes with male dancers playing instruments around her, as well as a scene of Vickers performing on an aerial hoop. The video premiered on 3 March on Play.com's website, encouraging anyone to pre-order Vickers upcoming album.

== Promotion ==
The first live performance of "Once" was at The Cooler in Bristol on 20 March 2010 on the first leg of her Songs from the Tainted Cherry Tree Tour. Since then, Vickers made a series of television appearances, including Scottish lifestyle show The Hour on 8 March 2010 and children's magazine programme Blue Peter on 13 April 2010. She performed for GMTV and BBC Switch on 14 and 17 April 2010, respectively. Vickers also appeared on BBC Radio 1 for an interview with Scott Mills on 12 April 2010, while he was the standby presenter on The Chris Moyles Show. In addition, she performed "Once" and a cover of "Just Say Yes" by Snow Patrol in the Live Lounge on 22 April 2010. She also went on the BBC2 show Something for The Weekend and ITV1's Loose Women but did not perform on either.

== Track listings ==
CD single

No.	Title	Length
1.	"Once"	2:58
2.	"Sunlight"	4:02
3.	"Jumping into Rivers" (Frou Frou central mix)	3:33
4.	"Four Leaf Clover" (Acoustic Version)	3:42

iTunes

No.	Title	Length
1.	"Once"	3:11
2.	"Once" (Manhattan Clique remix edit)	3:25

== Charts ==
=== Weekly charts ===
Weekly chart performance for "Once"
Chart (2010)	Peak position
Australia (ARIA)	61
Europe (European Hot 100 Singles)	5
Ireland (IRMA)	3
Scotland Singles (OCC)	2
South Korea International Chart (Gaon)	39
UK Singles (OCC)	1

=== Year-end charts ===
Year-end chart performance for "Once"
Chart (2010)	Position
UK Singles (OCC)	101

== Certifications ==
Region	Certification	Certified units/sales
United Kingdom (BPI)	Silver	200,000^{^}
^{^} Shipments figures based on certification alone.

== Release history ==
Region	Date	Format	Label	Ref.
Ireland	16 April 2010	Digital download	RCA	
United Kingdom	18 April 2010	Digital download	RCA	
United Kingdom	19 April 2010	CD single	RCA	
