= Nerina Pallot discography =

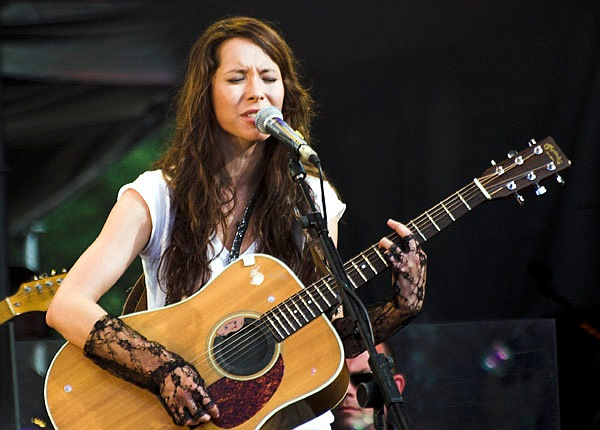
- Pallot performing in 2006
- Studio albums: 7
- EPs: 27
- Live albums: 2
- Compilation albums: 1
- Singles: 15
- Music videos: 14
- Promotional singles: 3
- Other appearances: 9

The discography of the British pop rock singer-songwriter Nerina Pallot consists of seven studio albums, twenty seven extended plays, fifteen singles (including one as a featured artist) and twelve music videos. Following a brief development deal with EMI, she signed a recording contract with Polydor Records in 2000.

Pallot's debut studio album, Dear Frustrated Superstar, was released in August 2001. It reached number 98 on the UK Albums Chart and produced two singles, "Patience" and "Alien". Due to the poor commercial performance of Dear Frustrated Superstar, she was released from Polydor Records and established her own independent record label, Idaho Records. In 2004, the singer collaborated with the electronic music duo Delerium on the single "Truly", which charted at number 54 in the UK and number two on the United States Billboard Hot Dance Club Songs chart.

Pallot's second studio album, Fires, was released in April 2005. It charted at number 21 on the UK Albums Chart and was certified gold by the British Phonographic Industry (BPI), selling 42,525 copies as of May 2006. Five singles, "Damascus", "All Good People", "Everybody's Gone to War", "Sophia" and "Learning to Breathe", were released from Fires. "Everybody's Gone to War" reached number 14 on the UK singles chart and number 41 on the Australian Singles Chart, while "Sophia" peaked at number 32 on the UK singles chart and at number 48 on the Swedish Singles Chart.

Pallot self-produced and recorded her third studio album, The Graduate, which was released in October 2009. It entered the UK Albums Chart number 46 and produced two singles: "Real Late Starter" and "I Don't Want To Go Out". Her fourth studio album, Year of the Wolf, followed in June 2011. The album debuted at number 31 in the UK and produced three singles: "Put Your Hands Up", "Turn Me on Again" and "All Bets Are Off".

Between December 2013 and December 2014, Pallot wrote, recorded and released a series of extended plays, with one released for each month of the year. Her fifth studio album, The Sound and the Fury, was released in September 2015; it was preceded by the single "The Road".

== Albums ==
=== Studio albums ===
List of studio albums, with selected chart positions and certifications
Title	Album details	Peak chart positions		Certifications
Title	Album details	UK	SCO	Certifications
Dear Frustrated Superstar	Released: 20 August 2001 (UK); Label: Polydor; Formats: CD, DD	82	73	
Fires^{[a]}	Released: 4 April 2005 (UK); Labels: Idaho, 14th Floor; Formats: CD, DD	21	22	BPI: Gold
The Graduate	Released: 5 October 2009 (UK); Labels: Idaho, Echo; Formats: CD, DD	46	45	
Year of the Wolf^{[b]}	Released: 13 June 2011 (UK); Label: Geffen; Formats: CD, DD, LP	31	44	
The Sound and the Fury	Released: 11 September 2015; Label: Idaho; Formats: CD, DD, LP, box set	41	54	
Stay Lucky	Released: 13 October 2017; Label: Idaho; Formats: CD, DD, LP	69	49	
I Don't Know What I'm Doing	Released: 17 June 2022; Label: Idaho; Formats: CD, DD, LP	—	—	
A Psalm for Emily Salvi	Released: 1 November 2024; Label: Idaho; Formats: CD, DD, LP	—	—	

=== Compilation albums ===
List of compilation albums
Title	Album details
My Best Friends Are Imaginary: A Year of EPs	Released: September 2016; Label: Idaho Records; Format: Streaming

=== Live albums ===
List of live albums
Title	Album details
Stay Lucky (Live from Rak Studios, 31/8/2017)	Released: 2018; Label: Idaho Records; Format: CD, DD, streaming
Live at the Zedel	Released: 2020; Label: Idaho Records; Format: DD
I Still Don't Know What I'm Doing (Live)	Released: 2022; Label: Idaho Records; Format: CD

== Extended plays ==
List of extended plays
Title	EP details
Buckminster Fuller	Released: 14 February 2009 (US); Label: Idaho; Formats: CD, DD
Junebug	Released: 17 July 2009 (UK); Label: Idaho; Formats: CD, DD
Skeleton Key	Released: 4 June 2010 (UK); Label: Idaho; Formats: CD, DD
Acoustic Sessions	Released: 9 December 2011; Label: Idaho; Formats: CD
Yes, December	Released: 9 December 2011 (UK); Label: Idaho; Formats: CD, DD
Lonely Valentine Club	Released: 12 February 2013 (UK); Label: Idaho; Formats: CD, DD
We Made It Through Another Year	Released: 16 December 2013 (UK); Label: Idaho; Formats: CD, DD
The Hold Tight	Released: 27 January 2014 (UK); Label: Idaho; Formats: CD, DD
We Should Break Up	Released: 28 February 2014 (UK); Label: Idaho; Formats: CD, DD
When the Morning Stars Sang Together	Released: 31 March 2014 (UK); Label: Idaho; Formats: CD, DD
Free As You Wanna Be	Released: 28 April 2014 (UK); Label: Idaho; Formats: CD, DD
Grand Union	Released 26 May 2014 (UK); Label: Idaho; Formats: CD, DD
When I Grow Up	Released 30 June 2014 (UK); Label: Idaho; Formats: CD, DD
Rousseau	Released 28 July 2014 (UK); Label: Idaho; Formats: CD, DD
Little Bull	Released 29 August 2014 (UK); Label: Idaho; Formats: CD, DD
Small Things	Released 29 September 2014 (UK); Label: Idaho; Formats: CD, DD
Spirit Walks	Released 31 October 2014 (UK); Label: Idaho; Formats: CD, DD
Live from Union Chapel	Released 30 November 2014 (UK); Label: Idaho; Formats: CD, DD
Winter Rooms	Released 31 December 2014 (UK); Label: Idaho; Formats: CD, DD
Hold On	Released 2020; Label: Idaho; Formats: DD
Photographs Volume 1	Released 2020; Label: Idaho; Formats: DD
Photographs Volume 2	Released 2020; Label: Idaho; Formats: DD
Photographs Volume 3	Released 2020; Label: Idaho; Formats: DD
Photographs Volume 4	Released 2020; Label: Idaho; Formats: DD
Photographs Volume 5	Released 2020; Label: Idaho; Formats: DD
Photographs Volume 6	Released 2020; Label: Idaho; Formats: DD
Old Dog, New Tricks	Released 2021; Label: Idaho; Formats: DD

== Singles ==
=== As a main artist ===
List of singles as a main artist, with selected chart positions, showing year released and album name
Title	Year	Peak chart positions						Album
Title	Year	UK	AUS	BEL	SCO	SWE	SWI	Album
"Patience"	2001	61	—	—	57	—	—	Dear Frustrated Superstar
"Alien"	2001	98	—	—	—	—	—	Dear Frustrated Superstar
"Damascus"	2005	—	—	—	—	—	—	Fires
"All Good People"	2005	—	—	—	—	—	—	Fires
"Everybody's Gone to War"	2006	14	41	60	11	—	98	Fires
"Sophia"	2006	32	—	—	23	48	—	Fires
"Learning to Breathe"	2007	70	—	—	22	—	—	Fires
"Peg"	2007	—	—	—	—	—	—	Non-album single
"Real Late Starter"	2009	—	—	—	—	—	—	The Graduate
"I Don't Want to Go Out"	2010	—	—	—	—	—	—	The Graduate
"Put Your Hands Up"	2011	—	—	—	—	—	—	Year of the Wolf
"Turn Me on Again"	2011	—	—	—	—	—	—	Year of the Wolf
"All Bets Are Off"	2012	—	—	—	—	—	—	Year of the Wolf
"The Road"	2015	—	—	—	—	—	—	The Sound and the Fury
"Rousseau"	2015	—	—	—	—	—	—	The Sound and the Fury
"If I Had a Girl"	2016	—	—	—	—	—	—	The Sound and the Fury
"Stay Lucky"	2017	—	—	—	—	—	—	Stay Lucky
"Better"	2017	—	—	—	—	—	—	Stay Lucky
"Man Didn't Walk on the Moon"	2017	—	—	—	—	—	—	Stay Lucky
"The Heart Is a Lonely Hunter"	2017	—	—	—	—	—	—	Stay Lucky
"Oh Berlin"	2020	—	—	—	—	—	—	Non-album singles
"Next Life"	2020	—	—	—	—	—	—	Non-album singles
"Cold Places"	2022	—	—	—	—	—	—	I Don't Know What I'm Doing
"Alice at the Beach"	2022	—	—	—	—	—	—	I Don't Know What I'm Doing
"Everybody's Gone To War (Nerina's Version)"	2024	—	—	—	—	—	—	Fires (Remastered)
"(Cash + Sin) Mr King"	2024	—	—	—	—	—	—	Fires (Remastered)
"Regrets"	2024	—	—	—	—	—	—	A Psalm for Emily Salvi
"High Time"	2024	—	—	—	—	—	—	A Psalm for Emily Salvi
"Pressure"	2024	—	—	—	—	—	—	A Psalm for Emily Salvi
"—" denotes items which were not released in that country or failed to chart

=== As a featured artist ===
List of singles as a featured artist, with selected chart positions, showing year released and album name
Title	Year	Peak chart positions		Album
Title	Year	UK	US Dance	Album
"Truly" (Delerium featuring Nerina Pallot)	2004	54	2	Chimera

=== Promotional singles ===
List of promotional singles, showing year released and album name
Title	Year	Album
"Ta chance"	2017	Stay Lucky
"Reviens au lit"	2017	Stay Lucky
"English" / "Jerusalem"	2019	Non-album single

== Other appearances ==
List of non-single appearances, with other performing artists, showing year released and album name
Title	Year	Other artist(s)	Album
"Dias Iguais"	2010	Sandy	Manuscrito
"Put It Back Together"	2010	Diana Vickers	Songs from the Tainted Cherry Tree
"Aphrodite"	2010	Kylie Minogue	Aphrodite
"Better than Today"	2010	Kylie Minogue	Aphrodite
"Shine On"	2011	—N/a	Reworked: Songs from the John Lewis TV Adverts
"Home"	2013	Nick Howard	Stay Who You Are
"If I Told You"	2013	Nick Howard	Stay Who You Are
"Put It Back Together"	2013	Nick Howard	Stay Who You Are
"Superhero"	2013	Nick Howard	Stay Who You Are

== Music videos ==
List of music videos, showing year released and director
Title	Year	Director(s)
"Patience"	2001	Emma Hvengaard
"Alien"	2001	—N/a
"Damascus"	2005	Tim Devine
"Everybody's Gone to War"	2006	Marc Klasfeld
"Sophia"	2006	John Hillcoat
"Learning to Breathe"	2007	—N/a
"Real Late Starter"	2009	Marc Klasfeld
"I Don't Want to Go Out"	2010	—N/a
"Put Your Hands Up"	2011	Max Knight
"Turn Me on Again"	2011	Steven Glashier
"All Bets Are Off"	2012	—N/a
"The Road"	2015	Damian Weilers
"Rousseau"	2015	Tommy Reynolds
"If I Had a Girl"	2016	

== Notes ==
- A Fires was reissued with a new track listing and artwork in the United Kingdom on 24 April 2006.
- B Year of the Wolf was reissued with additional tracks in the UK on 27 January 2012 as New Year of the Wolf.
- C "Everybody's Gone to War" did not enter the Belgian Ultratop 50 chart in Flanders, but peaked at number 10 on the Flemish Ultratip chart.
- D "Everybody's Gone to War" did not enter the Belgian Ultratop 40 (now Ultratop 50) chart in Wallonia, but peaked at number 17 on the Walloon Ultratip chart.
- E "Everybody's Gone to War" did not enter the Dutch Top 40, but peaked at number 29 on the Tipparade chart, which acts as a 30-song extension to the main Dutch Top 40 chart.
