= Slash discography =

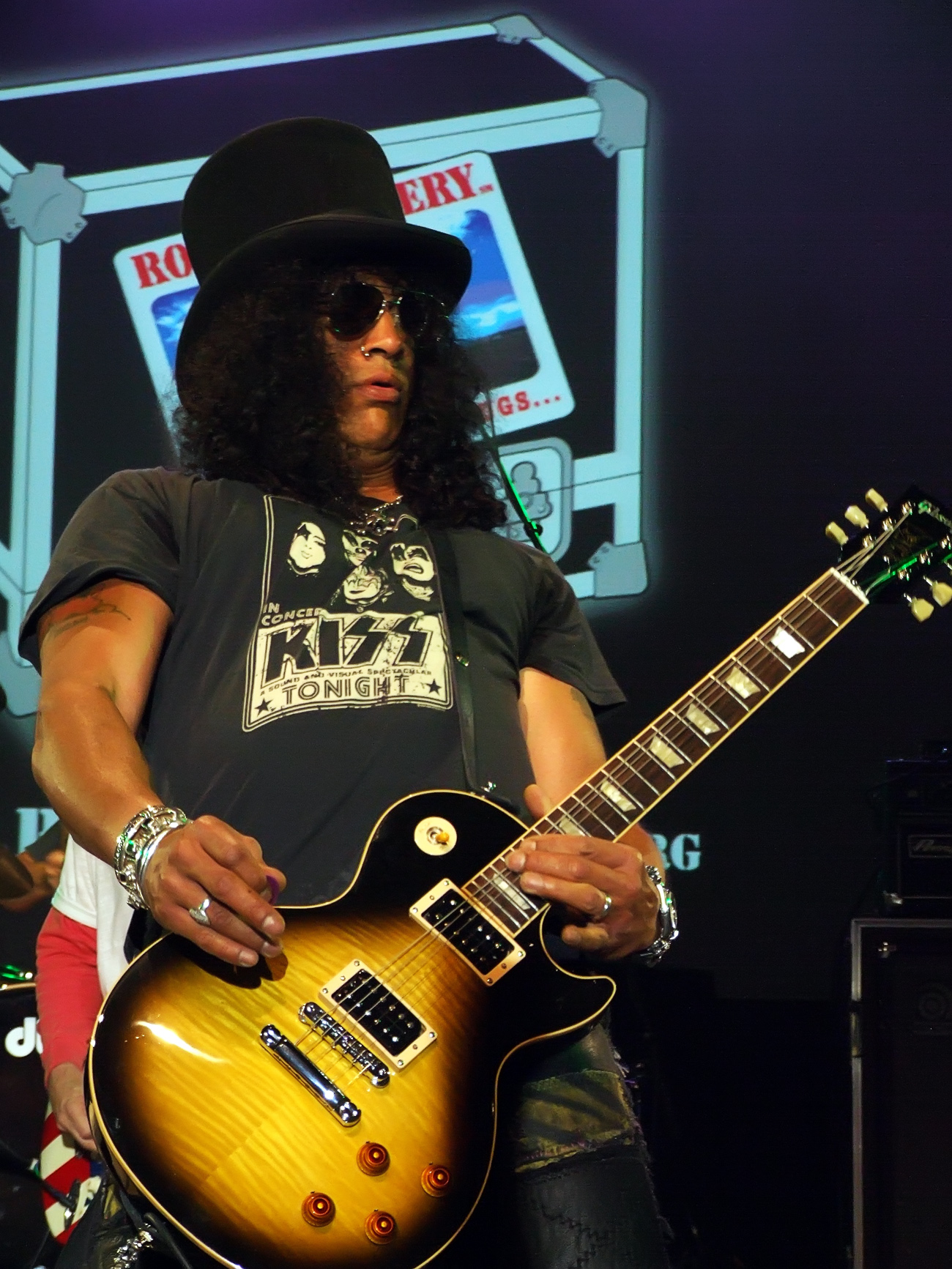
- Slash performing in 2008
- Studio albums: 6
- Extended plays: 2
- Live albums: 5
- Singles: 10
- Video albums: 2
- Music videos: 11

The solo discography of guitarist Slash (born Saul Hudson) comprises six studio albums, five live albums, two extended play (EP), 10 singles, and two video album. Slash has also featured on 12 singles by other artists, released ten music videos, and made contributions to numerous other releases.

After leaving the band Guns N' Roses in 1996 due to internal tensions with frontman Axl Rose, guitarist Slash experimented briefly with solo projects Slash's Blues Ball and Slash's Snakepit (the latter of which released two albums), before forming Velvet Revolver in 2002 with former Guns N' Roses bandmates Duff McKagan and Matt Sorum. Along with frontman Scott Weiland and rhythm guitarist Dave Kushner, the supergroup released two successful albums, Contraband in 2004 and Libertad in 2007, before Weiland was fired in 2008 and the band went on indefinite hiatus.

Recording for Slash's debut solo album began in September 2008 with different singers being enlisted for each song, including Ozzy Osbourne and The Black Eyed Peas vocalist Fergie. The resulting album, simply titled Slash, was released in April 2010, and debuted at number three on the US Billboard 200 albums chart. Preceding the release of the album, Slash had released the Japan-only single "Sahara", featuring Japanese vocalist Koshi Inaba. It charted at number four on the Oricon Singles Chart, as well number six on the Billboard Japan Hot 100 and number four on the Top Singles Sales chart. It has been awarded Western "Single of the Year" award at the 24th Japan Gold Disc Award by RIAJ. The three international single releases from Slash were "By the Sword" featuring Wolfmother frontman Andrew Stockdale, "Back from Cali" featuring Alter Bridge frontman Myles Kennedy – both of which charted on the Billboard Mainstream Rock chart – and the Fergie-featured "Beautiful Dangerous", which reached number 11 on the Billboard Top Heatseekers chart.

Myles Kennedy was chosen to front Slash's solo band for the resulting promotional tour, and just a few months later Live in Manchester, a live album documenting the group's performance at the Manchester Academy in July 2010, was released. The following year, Made in Stoke 24/7/11 was released as a live album and video, which documented the band's performance at the Victoria Hall in Stoke-on-Trent, his childhood hometown, in July 2011. The release reached number eight on the Billboard Hard Rock Albums chart, and also charted in Austria, Germany, and Switzerland.

In 2012, with Kennedy now a permanent part of his band, Slash released his second solo album Apocalyptic Love, which reached a peak position of number four on the Billboard 200. The lead single, "You're a Lie", topped the Mainstream Rock chart, while other album tracks "Standing in the Sun" and "Anastasia" later made it into the top ten of the chart as well. As of April 2014, Slash is recording his third solo album with Kennedy and their band The Conspirators (Todd Kerns and Brent Fitz).

== Studio albums ==
Title	Album details	Peak chart positions											Sales	Certifications (sales thresholds)
Title	Album details	US	AUS	AUT	CAN	FIN	GER	ITA	NZ	SWE	SWI	UK	Sales	Certifications (sales thresholds)
Slash	Released: March 31, 2010; Label: Dik Hayd; Formats: CD, 2LP, 2CD+DVD, DL	3	3	1	1	2	4	6	1	1	3	17	US: 160,000	ARIA: Platinum; BPI: Gold; MC: Platinum; RMNZ: Platinum
Apocalyptic Love	Released: May 22, 2012; Label: Dik Hayd; Formats: CD, 2CD+DVD, DL	4	2	3	2	3	5	3	1	4	3	12	US: 100,000	BPI: Silver; RMNZ: Gold
World on Fire	Released: September 15, 2014; Label: Dik Hayd	10	2	5	4	3	2	3	4	1	1	7	US: 42,000; CAN: 5,300	BPI: Silver
Living the Dream	Released: September 21, 2018; Label: Snakepit/Roadrunner	27	4	2	24	21	6	3	15	4	1	4		
4	Released: February 11, 2022; Label: Gibson	93	2	4	67	11	4	15	20	9	2	5		
Orgy of the Damned	Released: May 17, 2024; Label: Gibson	98	14	2	—	34	2	48	29	25	2	8		
Flying Blind	Released: February 26, 2027; Label: Gibson	—	—	—	—	—	—	—	—	—	—	—		

== Soundtracks ==
Year	Album details
2013	Nothing Left to Fear: Released: September 15, 2013; Label: Dik Hayd; Format: CD, 2LP
2018	Universal Monsters Maze: Released: 2018 (EP); 2022 (deluxe LP); Label: Snakepit; Format: digital download

== Live albums ==
Year	Album details	Peak chart positions						
Year	Album details	US	US Hard	US Indie	US Rock	AUT	GER	SWI
2010	Live in Manchester: Released: July 3, 2010; Label: Dik Hayd; Formats: CD, DL	—	—	—	—	—	—	—
2011	Made in Stoke 24/7/11: Released: November 14, 2011; Label: Eagle Rock; Formats: 2CD, 3LP, 2CD+DVD, DL	194	8	29	33	74	40	80
2015	Live at the Roxy 9.25.14: Released: June 15, 2015; Label: Eagle Rock; Formats: CD, 2LP, DL, DVD, Blu-ray	—	—	—	—	69	29	60
2019	Living the Dream Tour: Released: September 20, 2019; Label: Eagle Rock; Formats: CD, 2LP, DL, DVD, Blu-ray	—	—	—	—	—	27	42
2025	Live at the S.E.R.P.E.N.T. Festival: Released: November 7, 2025; Label: Earmusic; Formats: 2CD, 3LP, DL, Blu-ray	—	—	—	—	26	38	33

== Extended plays ==
Year	EP details	Chart peaks				Track listing
Year	EP details	US	US Hard	US Indie	US Rock	Track listing
2011	iTunes Session: Released: June 3, 2011; Label: Dik Hayd; Format: DL	174	13	16	39	Track listing: No. / Title / Length; 1. / "Back from Cali" (2011 version) (originally from Slash) / 3:38; 2. / "Communication Breakdown" (Led Zeppelin cover) / 3:05; 3. / "Fall to Pieces" (Velvet Revolver cover) / 4:37; 4. / "Rocket Queen" (Guns N' Roses cover) / 7:35; 5. / "Starlight" (2011 version) (originally from Slash) / 5:38; 6. / "Sucker Train Blues" (Velvet Revolver cover) / 5:15
2014	Spotify Sessions: Released: August 25, 2014; Label: Dik Hayd; Format: Stream	87	72	35	31	Track listings: No. / Title / Length; 1. / "Standing in the Sun" (acoustic) (originally from Apocalyptic Love) / 4:30; 2. / "Starlight" (acoustic) (originally from Slash) / 6:00; 3. / "Bent to Fly" (acoustic) (original version later released on World on Fire) / 5:05; 4. / "Sweet Child O' Mine" (acoustic Guns N' Roses cover) / 6:37

== Singles ==
=== As lead artist ===
Year	Song	Peak chart positions							Album
Year	Song	US Heat.	US Main.	US Rock	CAN	CAN Rock	GER	JPN	Album
2009	"Sahara" (featuring Koshi Inaba)	—	—	—	—	—	—	6	Non-album single
2010	"By the Sword" (featuring Andrew Stockdale)	—	25	41	78	3	—	80	Slash
2010	"Back from Cali" (featuring Myles Kennedy)	—	24	47	—	8	—	—	Slash
2010	"Beautiful Dangerous" (featuring Fergie)	11	—	—	58	—	90	—	Slash
2012	"You're a Lie" (featuring Myles Kennedy and The Conspirators)	—	1	12	80	3	—	—	Apocalyptic Love
2012	"Standing in the Sun" (featuring Myles Kennedy and The Conspirators)	—	4	28	—	6	—	—	Apocalyptic Love
2012	"Anastasia" (featuring Myles Kennedy and The Conspirators)	—	6	—	—	25	—	—	Apocalyptic Love
2014	"World on Fire" (featuring Myles Kennedy and The Conspirators)	—	1	43	—	13	—	—	World on Fire
2014	"Bent to Fly" (featuring Myles Kennedy and The Conspirators)	—	3	—	—	48	—	—	World on Fire
2018	"Driving Rain" (featuring Myles Kennedy and The Conspirators)	21	5	41	—	8	—	—	Living the Dream
2018	"Mind Your Manners" (featuring Myles Kennedy and The Conspirators)	—	9	—	—	30	—	—	Living the Dream
2020	"Where Do I Begin? (Theme from Love Story)"	—	—	—	—	—	—	—	Non-album single
2021	"The River Is Rising" (featuring Myles Kennedy and the Conspirators)	—	8	—	—	46	—	—	4
2022	"April Fool" (featuring Myles Kennedy and the Conspirators)	—	—	—	—	—	—	—	4
2024	"Oh Well" (featuring Chris Stapleton)	—	—	43	—	—	—	—	Orgy of the Damned
2026	"Flying Blind" (featuring Myles Kennedy and the Conspirators)	—	24	—	—	—	—	—	Flying Blind
"—" denotes a release that did not chart or was not issued in that region.

=== As featured artist ===
Year	Song	Peak chart positions										Album
Year	Song	US	AUS	AUT	FRA	GER	NED	NOR	NZ	SWI	UK	Album
1991	"Always on the Run" (Lenny Kravitz featuring Slash)	—	43	—	—	—	8	—	—	25	41	Mama Said
1991	"Hey Stoopid" (Alice Cooper featuring Slash, Ozzy Osbourne and Joe Satriani)	78	32	—	—	—	22	5	17	—	21	Hey Stoopid
1993	"Give In to Me" (Michael Jackson featuring Slash)	—	4	12	7	10	4	7	1	7	2	Dangerous
1997	"Moja Mi Corazón" (Marta Sánchez featuring Slash)	—	—	—	—	—	—	—	—	—	—	Azabache
1997	"Halls of Illusions" (Insane Clown Posse featuring Slash)	—	—	—	—	—	—	—	—	—	—	The Great Milenko
2006	"Nada Puede Cambiarme" (Paulina Rubio featuring Slash)	—	—	—	—	—	—	—	—	—	—	Ananda
2006	"What I Want" (Daughtry featuring Slash)	—	—	—	—	—	—	—	—	—	—	Daughtry
2009	"The Wrestler" (Clint Mansell featuring Slash)	—	—	—	—	—	—	—	—	—	—	Non-album single
2009	"Kashmir" (Escala featuring Slash)	—	—	—	—	—	—	—	—	—	78	Escala
2010	"Hands Together" (Global Sound Lodge featuring Slash)	—	—	—	—	—	—	—	—	—	—	Non-album single
2010	"Sister Heroine" (Beth Hart featuring Slash)	—	—	—	—	—	—	—	—	—	—	My California
2010	"Rebel Road" (Edgar Winter featuring Slash)	—	—	—	—	—	—	—	—	—	—	Rebel Road
2010	"Rockstar 101" (Rihanna featuring Slash)	64	24	—	—	—	—	—	—	—	—	Rated R
2015	"Storm Riders" (Sandaime J Soul Brothers featuring Slash)	—	—	—	—	—	—	—	—	—	—	The JSB Legacy
2020	"Maybe It's Time" (Sixx:A.M. featuring Joe Elliott, Brantley Gilbert, Ivan Moody, Slash, Corey Taylor, Awolnation and Tommy Vext)	—	—	—	—	—	—	—	—	—	—	Sno Babies
2023	"Sorry Not Sorry (Rock Version)" (Demi Lovato featuring Slash)	—	—	—	—	—	—	—	—	—	—	Revamped
2025	"Tombstone Town" (Dorothy featuring Slash)	—	—	—	—	—	—	—	—	—	—	The Way
"—" denotes a release that did not chart or was not issued in that region.

=== Other charted songs ===
Year	Song	Chart peaks				Album
Year	Song	US Hard Digi.	US Main.	US Rock	CAN	Album
2010	"Paradise City" (featuring Fergie and Cypress Hill)	—	—	—	75	Slash
2010	"Ghost" (featuring Ian Astbury)	—	—	—	—	Slash
2011	"Promise" (featuring Chris Cornell)	—	46	2	—	Slash
2011	"I Hold On" (featuring Kid Rock)	—	—	85	—	Slash
2011	"Starlight" (featuring Myles Kennedy)	—	—	—	—	Slash
2012	"Bad Rain" (featuring Myles Kennedy and The Conspirators)	—	12	11	—	Apocalyptic Love
2014	"Stone Blind" (featuring Myles Kennedy and The Conspirators)	—	—	15	—	World on Fire
2014	"30 Years to Life" (featuring Myles Kennedy and The Conspirators)	18	—	—	24	World on Fire
2014	"Safari Inn" (featuring Myles Kennedy and the Conspirators)	10	—	—	—	World on Fire
2018	"My Antidote" (featuring Myles Kennedy and The Conspirators)	—	—	40	15	Living the Dream
2021	"Fill My World" (featuring Myles Kennedy and The Conspirators)	—	—	—	—	4
2022	"Call of the Dogs" (featuring Myles Kennedy and The Conspirators)	—	—	—	—	4
"—" denotes a release that did not chart or was not issued in that region.

== Other appearances ==
=== Studio appearances ===
Year	Song	Album
1993	"Magic Carpet Ride" (with Michael Monroe)	Coneheads: Music from the Motion Picture Soundtrack
1993	"I Don't Live Today" (with Paul Rodgers and the Band of Gypsys)	Stone Free: A Tribute to Jimi Hendrix
1996	"Obsession Confession"	Curdled: Music From The Miramax Motion Picture
1996	"Obsession" (with Marta Sánchez)	Curdled: Music From The Miramax Motion Picture
1999	"No More Mr. Nice Guy" (with Roger Daltrey)	Welcome to the Nightmare: An All Star Salute to Alice Cooper
2002	"Love Theme from The Godfather"	The Kid Stays in the Picture
2004	"Sing a Song of Sixpence"	Sing a Song with Six Strings
2006	"Get On"	Ocean Tribe: Sunrise
2007	"Guitar Hero III Intro"	Guitar Hero III: Legends of Rock Companion Pack
2007	"Slash Guitar Battle"	digital download
2015	"Sweet Child o' Mine" (with Miles Kennedy)	Dermot O'Leary Presents The Saturday Sessions 2015
2025	"Feel Like Makin' Love" (with Bad Company, Myles Kennedy and The Conspirators)	Can't Get Enough: A Tribute To Bad Company

=== Guest appearances ===
Year	Song	Artist(s)	Album
1988	"Under My Wheels"	Alice Cooper	The Decline of Western Civilization Part II: The Metal Years
1990	"Butt Town"	Iggy Pop	Brick by Brick
1990	"Home"	Iggy Pop	Brick by Brick
1990	"My Baby Wants to Rock & Roll"	Iggy Pop	Brick by Brick
1990	"Pussy Power"	Iggy Pop	Brick by Brick
1990	"Wiggle Wiggle"	Bob Dylan	Under the Red Sky
1991	"Fields of Joy"	Lenny Kravitz	Mama Said
1991	"Give In To Me"	Michael Jackson	Dangerous
1992	"Break Like the Wind"	Spinal Tap	Break Like the Wind
1992	"I Ain't No Nice Guy"	Motörhead	March ör Die
1992	"You Better Run"	Motörhead	March ör Die
1993	"Hold Out for Love"	Carole King	Colour of Your Dreams
1993	"Tie Your Mother Down"	Brian May	"Resurrection"
1993	"Believe in Me"	Duff McKagan	Believe in Me
1993	"Just Not There"	Duff McKagan	Believe in Me
1993	"The Hunter"	Paul Rodgers	Muddy Water Blues: A Tribute to Muddy Waters
1994	"Cure Me... Or Kill Me..."	Gilby Clarke	Pawnshop Guitars
1994	"Tijuana Jail"	Gilby Clarke	Pawnshop Guitars
1994	"Hold Out for Love"	Carole King	In Concert
1994	"Locomotion"	Carole King	In Concert
1995	"The Star Spangled Banner"	Brian McKnight; The Boys Choir of Harlem	Panther
1995	"D.S."	Michael Jackson	HIStory: Past, Present and Future, Book I
1996	"Where You Belong"	Carmine Appice	Guitar Zeus
1997	"Morphine"	Michael Jackson	Blood on the Dance Floor: HIStory in the Mix
1997	"Halls of Illusion"	Insane Clown Posse	The Great Milenko
1997	"Little White Lie"	Sammy Hagar	Marching to Mars
1997	"Elected"	Alice Cooper	A Fistful of Alice
1997	"Lost in America"	Alice Cooper	A Fistful of Alice
1997	"Only Women Bleed"	Alice Cooper	A Fistful of Alice
1997	"But You Said I'm Useless"	J	Pyromania
1998	"Bayangan"	Ella	El
1999	"Le Freak"	Chic	Live at the Budokan
1999	"Stone Free"	Chic	Live at the Budokan
1999	"Oh! Darling"	Graham Bonnet	The Day I Went Mad
1999	"Anxious Disease"	The Outpatience	Anxious Disease
2000	"Now or Never"	Doro	Calling the Wild
2001	"You're All Talk"	Cheap Trick	Silver
2001	"Human"	Rod Stewart	Human
2001	"Peach"	Rod Stewart	Human
2001	"Privacy"	Michael Jackson	Invincible
2002	"Tie Your Mother Down"	Queen; Joe Elliott	The Freddie Mercury Tribute Concert
2002	"Wishing Well"	Bad Company	In Concert: Merchants of Cool
2002	"God Bless America Again"	Ray Charles; Billy Preston	Ray Charles Sings for America
2003	"Over Under Sideways Down"	The Yardbirds	Birdland
2003	"Street Child"	Elán	Street Child
2004	"The Blame Game"	Matt Sorum	Hollywood Zen
2006	"Mustang Nismo"	Brian Tyler	The Fast and the Furious: Tokyo Drift
2006	"Welcome to Tokyo"	Brian Tyler	The Fast and the Furious: Tokyo Drift
2006	"In the Summertime"	Derek Sherinian	Blood of the Snake
2006	"Out of Reach"	Sarah Kelly	Where the Past Meets Today
2006	"Still Breathing"	Sarah Kelly	Where the Past Meets Today
2008	"Vocalise"	Les Paul	Les Paul & Friends: A Tribute to a Legend
2008	"Vengeance Is Mine"	Alice Cooper	Along Came a Spider
2008	"Gioca Con Me"	Vasco Rossi	Il Mondo Che Vorrei
2008	"Road & Me"	Williams Riley	Williams Riley Band
2008	"Eye of the Tiger"	Willfire	Euro Football Party Dance Hits 2008
2010	"68"	Steve Lukather; Neal Schon	6 String Theory
2010	"Rockin' My Life Away"	Jerry Lee Lewis; Kid Rock	Mean Old Man
2010	"Fancy Pants"	Ronnie Wood	I Feel Like Playing
2010	"Forever"	Ronnie Wood	I Feel Like Playing
2010	"Spoonful"	Ronnie Wood	I Feel Like Playing
2010	"Sweetness My Weakness"	Ronnie Wood	I Feel Like Playing
2010	"Why You Wanna Go and Do a Thing Like That"	Ronnie Wood	I Feel Like Playing
2010	"Sister Heroine"	Beth Hart	My California
2010	"Check the Level"	The Dirty Heads	Any Port in a Storm
2011	"Saturday Night"	Transplants	Give the Drummer Some
2011	"Drive Me"	State Line Empire	Octane
2011	"Kick It Up a Notch"	Phineas and Ferb	Phineas and Ferb: Across the 1st and 2nd Dimensions
2011	"Mudflap Momma"	Leslie West	Unusual Suspects
2011	"The Party's Over"	Leslie West	Unusual Suspects
2012	"B.B. Jams with Guests"	B.B. King	Live at the Royal Albert Hall 2001
2012	"Guess Who"	B.B. King	Live at the Royal Albert Hall 2001
2012	"The Thrill Is Gone"	B.B. King	Live at the Royal Albert Hall 2001
2012	"When the Saints Go Marching In"	B.B. King	Live at the Royal Albert Hall 2001
2012	"Deep in the Blues"	Lou Pallo	Thank You Les: A Tribute to Les Paul
2012	"Just Don't Ask"	Adler	Back from the Dead
2013	"Here's to Us" (guest version)	Halestorm	The Strange Case Of...
2013	"Lock 'n' Load"	The Dead Daisies	The Dead Daisies
2014	"И Аз Mога" (feat. Lanny Cordola) (Bonus Track)	D2	Феникс
2015	"Tonight We Met (And Now We're Going to Fuck)" (Bonus Track)	Chip Z'Nuff	Strange Time
2015	"School's Out / Another Brick in the Wall (Part 2)"	Hollywood Vampires	Hollywood Vampires
2016	"Emerald"	Ace Frehley	Origins Vol. 1
2016	"Power Music" (feat. Redman)	A.M	Power Music
2017	"Magic Carpet Ride (Unreleased Version)"	Michael Monroe	The Best
2019	"American Rock 'N' Roll" (feat. Mick Fleetwood and Chad Smith)	Don Felder	American Rock 'n' Roll
2019	"One Giant Farm"	Les Stroud	Mother Earth
2020	"Straight to Hell"	Ozzy Osbourne	Ordinary Man
2020	"Ordinary Man" (feat. Elton John)	Ozzy Osbourne	Ordinary Man
2020	"Interstate 80"	Tom Morello	Comandante
2021	"Hood Hop"	Big Caz	Non-album single
2021	"Hood Hop Remix" (feat. Ice-T)	Big Caz	Non-album single
2021	"Tie Your Mother Down" (live on The Tonight Show, April '93)	Brian May	Back to the Light (Out of the Light Bonus disc) (2021 reissue)
2022	"I Live Too Fast To Die Young"	Michael Monroe	I Live Too Fast to Die Young!
2023	"Nice Boys"	Fear	Nice Boys (Don't Play Rock N' Roll)
2023	"21 Forever" (feat. Dolly Parton}	Chris Janson	The Outlaw Side of Me
2023	"I'm Just Ken"	Ryan Gosling	Barbie the Album
2023	"Hope"	Duff McKagan	Lighthouse
2024	"I'd Like to Help You With Your Problem"	The Dandy Warhols	Rockmaker
2024	"The End of Tomorrow" (feat. Brendon McCreary)	Bear McCreary	The Singularity
2024	"Mother Mary" (feat. Erik Grönwall)	Michael Schenker	My Years with UFO
2024	"The Edge of the Switchblade" (feat. William DuVall)	MC5	Heavy Lifting
2024	"Savior with a Razor"	Beth Hart	You Still Got Me

== Video albums ==
Year	Album details
2011	Made in Stoke 24/7/11: Released: November 14, 2011; Label: Eagle Vision; Formats: DVD, BD
2015	Live at the Roxy 25.9.14: Released: June 15, 2015; Label: Eagle Vision; Formats: DVD, BD

== Music videos ==
Year	Song
2010	"By the Sword" (featuring Andrew Stockdale)
2010	"Back from Cali" (featuring Myles Kennedy)
2010	"Beautiful Dangerous" (featuring Fergie)
2012	"Gotten" (featuring Adam Levine)
2012	"You're a Lie" (featuring Myles Kennedy and The Conspirators)
2012	"Bad Rain" (featuring Myles Kennedy and The Conspirators)
2013	"Anastasia" (featuring Myles Kennedy and The Conspirators)
2014	"World on Fire" (featuring Myles Kennedy and The Conspirators)
2018	"Driving Rain" (featuring Myles Kennedy and The Conspirators)
2018	"Mind Your Manners" (featuring Myles Kennedy and The Conspirators)
2019	"Boulevard of Broken Hearts" (featuring Myles Kennedy and The Conspirators)
2021	"The River Is Rising" (featuring Myles Kennedy and The Conspirators)
2022	"April Fool" (featuring Myles Kennedy and The Conspirators)
2024	"Killing Floor" (featuring Brian Johnson)
2024	"Papa Was a Rolling Stone" (featuring Demi Lovato)
2026	"Flying Blind" (featuring Myles Kennedy and The Conspirators)

== See also ==
- Guns N' Roses discography
- Slash's Snakepit
- Velvet Revolver discography
