= Real Late Starter =

Single by Nerina Pallot

from the album The Graduate
- B-side: "Peg", "My Last Tango"
- Released: 19 October 2009
- Recorded: 2009
- Genre: Pop/Rock
- Length: 3.22
- Label: Idaho, Echo
- Songwriter(s): Pallot

Nerina Pallot singles chronology
"Learning to Breathe" (2007)	"Real Late Starter" (2009)	"I Don't Want To Go Out" (2010)

"Real Late Starter" is the first single from Nerina Pallot's third album, The Graduate. The single was released as a three-track digital download and as well as an exclusive 7" vinyl, only available on Nerina's website in the UK on 19 October 2009 after the release of the album, with a cover of Steely Dan's "Peg" and an acoustic version of "My Last Tango" (from Dear Frustrated Superstar) as the B-sides. The song was written and produced by Nerina Pallot, mixed by Andy Chatterley and mastered at Blue Pro Mastering. Real Late Starter was A-Playlisted in the UK by BBC Radio 2. It did not reach the Official UK top 40 on release, but did reach number 19 in the Indie Singles chart. The song was covered by Joe McElderry in 2010 and is featured on his debut album Wide Awake. Pallot's backing vocals remained on McElderry's version.

== Track listings ==
Digital download

1. "Real Late Starter" (We Are The Chatterleys Mix)
2. "Peg"
3. "My Last Tango (Acoustic)"

=== Charts ===
Year	Chart	Position
2009	UK Indie Chart	19
