= The Saturday Sessions From The Dermot O'Leary Show =

Compilation album by Various artists
- Released: 24 March 2014 (UK)
- Genre: Various
- Label: EMI

Various artists chronology
Dermot O'Leary Presents The Saturday Sessions 2013 (2013)	The Saturday Sessions From The Dermot O'Leary Show (2014)	Dermot O'Leary Presents The Saturday Sessions 2015 (2015)

The Saturday Sessions From The Dermot O'Leary Show is a 2-disc compilation album, a collection from BBC Radio 2's new music programme, which takes place every Saturday afternoon on BBC Radio 2, released in the United Kingdom in March 2014. Many of the artists featured were first introduced by English radio personality and television presenter, Dermot O'Leary. It hit Number 1 in the UK iTunes charts the week of its release

== Track listing ==
Disc 1

1. London Grammar - "Wicked Game" (originally by Chris Isaak)
2. Rudimental - "Ready Or Not" (originally by Fugees)
3. Ellie Goulding - "Anything Could Happen"
4. John Newman - "Sign Your Name" (originally by Terence Trent D'Arby)
5. Gabrielle Aplin - "I'm On Fire" (originally by Bruce Springsteen)
6. James Arthur - "Mr. Writer" (originally by Stereophonics)
7. The Lumineers - "Ho Hey"
8. Tom Odell - "Another Love"
9. Ben Howard - "The Boxer" (originally by Simon & Garfunkel)
10. Keane - "Somewhere Only We Know"
11. The XX - "Teardrops" (originally by Womack & Womack)
12. Rival Sons - "Back To Black" (originally by Amy Winehouse)
13. Alex Clare - "Too Close"
14. John Smith - "Great Lakes"
15. Foy Vance - "Where Everybody Knows Your Name" (originally by Gary Portnoy)
16. Foxes - "Hold On, We're Going Home/The Monster" (originally by Drake Feat. Majid Jordan/Eminem Feat. Rihanna)
17. Nerina Pallot - "Finally" (originally by Cece Peniston)
18. Lissie - "Drive" (originally by The Cars)
19. Emily Barker & The Choir Of Angels - "Day After Tomorrow" (originally by Tom Waits)
20. Emeli Sandé - "Next To Me"

Disc 2

1. Stereophonics - "Subterranean Homesick Blues" (originally by Bob Dylan)
2. Biffy Clyro - "Get Lucky" (originally by Daft Punk Feat. Pharrell Williams)
3. Hurts - "Wonderwall" (originally by Oasis)
4. The 1975 - "Sex"
5. Turin Brakes - "Chim Chim Cher-ee" (originally by Dick Van Dyke & Julie Andrews)
6. Alt-J - "Dancing in the Moonlight (It's Caught Me in Its Spotlight)" (originally by Thin Lizzy)
7. The National - "Runaway"
8. Editors - "Smokers Outside The Hospital Doors"
9. Manic Street Preachers - "Let Robeson Sing"
10. Foals - "Milk & Black Spiders"
11. Villagers - "Where Are We Now?" (originally by David Bowie)
12. We Are Augustines - "Nothing To Lose But Your Head"
13. Cattle & Cane - "Addicted to Love" (originally by Robert Palmer)
14. The Leisure Society - "Fight For Everyone"
15. Richard Hawley - "Leave Your Body Behind You"
16. Ásgeir - "Heart-Shaped Box" (originally by Nirvana)
17. Thomas Dybdahl - "But We Did"
18. The Milk Carton Kids - "New York"
19. Ruen Brothers - "The Jean Genie" (originally by David Bowie)
20. Primal Scream - "It's Alright, It's Ok"
