= Year of the Wolf =

Studio album by Nerina Pallot
- Released: 13 June 2011
- Recorded: 2010–2011
- Genre: Pop; pop rock
- Label: Geffen Records
- Producer: Nerina Pallot; Andy Chatterley; Bernard Butler

Nerina Pallot chronology
| The Graduate (2009) | Year of the Wolf (2011) | The Sound and The Fury (2015) |

Singles from Year of the Wolf
- 1. "Put Your Hands Up" Released: 23 May 2011; 2. "Turn Me On Again" Released: 22 August 2011; 3. "All Bets Are Off" Released: 30 January 2012

Year of the Wolf is the fourth album by British singer-songwriter Nerina Pallot. It was released on 13 June 2011. The first single is the track "Put Your Hands Up". Popjustice called the song "an understated yet patently brilliant tune" and "highly addictive".

The album entered the UK Albums Chart at No. 31.

== Background and recording ==
After self-releasing her third album The Graduate, Pallot returned to a major label, Geffen Records, for the release of Year of the Wolf. The album's title comes from her son, Wolfie, with whom she was pregnant during the recording of the album. In an interview with the BBC, Pallot said that her pregnancy affected both the physical recording of the song, making it more difficult to sing, and also its emotional content, particularly the song "History Boys". Talking of that song, she said "there's a human sadness and tragedy at the heart of [war]. And that's what I was trying to describe in the song – loss. The senseless loss of young lives." On whether or not there was a thematic link between that and her anti-war song "Everybody's Gone to War", she said that "on a personal level, I feel less angry, more sad."

The lead single "Put Your Hands Up" was originally written for Kylie Minogue's album Aphrodite. The track was ultimately rejected (although two other Pallot penned tracks "Aphrodite" and "Better than Today" made the final cut). Minogue's album did include a track with the title "Put Your Hands Up (If You Feel Love)" (written by Starsmith and Nervo), but this has no connection to the Pallot song.

== Reception ==
Professional ratings
Review scores
| Source | Rating |
|---|---|
| NME | 6/10 stars |
| The Guardian | 4/5 stars |
| BBC | Positive |
| AllMusic | 4/5 stars |

The album received generally positive reviews from fans and critics alike, many complimenting the more mature sound and direction.

== Track listing ==
Standard edition – Polydor 2764024
| No. | Title | Writer(s) | Length |
|---|---|---|---|
| 1. | "Put Your Hands Up" | Nerina Pallot; Andy Chatterley | 3:28 |
| 2. | "Turn Me on Again" | Pallot | 3:42 |
| 3. | "All Bets Are Off" | Pallot | 4:12 |
| 4. | "If I Lost You Now" | Pallot | 2:54 |
| 5. | "Butterfly" | Pallot | 3:27 |
| 6. | "This Will Be Our Year" | Pallot | 4:26 |
| 7. | "I Think" | Pallot | 3:44 |
| 8. | "Will You Still Love Me" | Pallot | 2:51 |
| 9. | "I Do Not Want What I Do Not Have" | Pallot; Linda Perry | 3:22 |
| 10. | "Grace" | Pallot; Steve McEwan | 4:22 |
| 11. | "History Boys" | Pallot | 3:35 |

iTunes bonus tracks
| No. | Title | Writer(s) | Length |
|---|---|---|---|
| 12. | "Seventeen" | Pallot | 4:43 |
| 13. | "Love's Going to Lose My Head" | Pallot | 4:13 |
| 14. | "Not the Same" | Pallot | 3:54 |

New Year of the Wolf re-release bonus tracks
| No. | Title | Writer(s) | Length |
|---|---|---|---|
| 12. | "Seventeen" | Pallot | 4:43 |
| 13. | "Love's Going to Lose My Head" | Pallot | 4:13 |
| 14. | "Not the Same" | Pallot | 3:54 |
| 15. | "Crazy in Love" (Live on the Dermot O'Leary Show on BBC Radio 2) | Beyoncé Knowles; Rich Harrison; Eugene Record; Shawn Carter | 3:37 |
| 16. | "Rocket Man" (Live on the Weekend Wogan Show on BBC Radio 2) | Elton John; Bernie Taupin | 3:43 |
| 17. | "At the Chime of a City Clock" (Live on the Jools Holland Show on BBC Radio 2) | Nick Drake | 4:31 |
| 18. | "Someone to Watch Over Me" (Live on the Friday Night Is Music Night Show On BBC Radio 2) | George Gershwin; Ira Gershwin | 5:36 |
| 19. | "Life on Mars" (Live on the Friday Night Is Music Night Show on BBC Radio 2) | David Bowie | 3:48 |
| 20. | "High & Dry" (Live on the Radio 2 In Concert Show on BBC Radio 2) | Colin Greenwood; Ed O'Brien; Philip Selway; Thom Yorke; Jonny Greenwood | 4:13 |

New Year of the Wolf iTunes bonus videos
| No. | Title | Writer(s) | Length |
|---|---|---|---|
| 21. | "Put Your Hands Up" (Acoustic) | Pallot; Chatterley | 3:39 |
| 22. | "Turn Me On Again" (Acoustic) | Pallot | 4:14 |
