= Dermot O'Leary Presents The Saturday Sessions 2011 =

Compilation album by Various artists
- Released: 7 November 2011 (UK)
- Genre: Various
- Label: EMI

Various artists chronology
Dermot O'Leary Presents The Saturday Sessions (2010)	Dermot O'Leary Presents The Saturday Sessions 2011 (2011)	Dermot O'Leary Presents The Saturday Sessions 2013 (2013)

Dermot O'Leary Presents The Saturday Sessions 2011 is a 2-disc compilation album, which takes place every Saturday afternoon on BBC Radio 2, released in the United Kingdom in November 2011 Many of the artists featured were first introduced by English radio personality and television presenter, Dermot O'Leary.

== Track listing ==
Disc 1

1. Adele - "Rolling In The Deep"
2. Will Young - "Running Up That Hill" (originally by Kate Bush)
3. Jessie J - "I Wanna Dance With Somebody" (originally by Whitney Houston)
4. Kelly Rowland - "When Love Takes Over" (originally by David Guetta feat. Kelly Rowland)
5. The Pierces - "The Air That I Breathe" (originally by The Hollies)
6. Florence And The Machine - "Cosmic Love"
7. Foster The People - "Pumped Up Kicks"
8. Plan B - "The Tracks Of My Tears" (originally by Smokey Robinson and the Miracles)
9. Paloma Faith - "I'd Rather Go Blind" (originally by Etta James)
10. Rumer - "Moon River" (originally by Henry Mancini)
11. Nerina Pallot - "Crazy In Love" (originally by Beyoncé)
12. Kill It Kid - "I Need A Dollar" (originally by Aloe Blacc)
13. Maverick Sabre - "Georgia On My Mind" (originally by Ray Charles)
14. Two Door Cinema Club - "Something Good Can Work"
15. Editors - "Papillon"
16. Eels - "Summer in the City" (originally by The Lovin' Spoonful)
17. Jon Fratelli - "Dancing in the Dark" (originally by Bruce Springsteen)
18. John Grant - "Angel Eyes" (originally by ABBA)
19. The Feeling - "Wichita Lineman" (originally by Glen Campbell)
20. Elbow - "Way Down In The Hole" (originally by Tom Waits (Theme From The Wire))

Disc 2

1. Cee-Lo - "Forget U"
2. Noah And The Whale - "L.I.F.E.G.O.E.S.O.N."
3. Paolo Nutini - "Beeswing" (originally by Richard Thompson)
4. Kasabian - "Runaway" (originally by Del Shannon)
5. Manic Street Preachers - "The Masses Against The Classes"
6. Ryan Adams - "Times Like These" (originally by Foo Fighters)
7. King Creosote, Jon Hopkins - "I've Been Losing You" (originally by a-ha)
8. The Avett Brothers - "I and Love and You"
9. The Leisure Society - "Me and Julio Down by the Schoolyard" (originally by Paul Simon)
10. The Civil Wars - "Billie Jean" (originally by Michael Jackson)
11. Michael Kiwanuka - "No Surprises" (originally by Radiohead)
12. Villagers - "Tightrope" (originally by Janelle Monáe)
13. Camera Obscura - "Some Guys Have All the Luck" (originally by Rod Stewart)
14. OK Go - "Here It Goes Again"
15. Emily Barker & The Red Clay Halo - "Pause (Theme From 'The Shadow Line')"
16. Boxes - "Streets of Philadelphia" (originally by Bruce Springsteen)
17. James Vincent McMorrow - "Wicked Game" (originally by Chris Isaak)
18. Gomez - "The Only Living Boy in New York" (originally by Simon & Garfunkel)
19. Moby - "Natural Blues"
20. Robbie Williams - "You Know Me"
