= Dermot O'Leary Presents The Saturday Sessions =

Compilation album by Various artists
- Released: 4 October 2010 (UK)
- Genre: Various
- Label: EMI

Various artists chronology
The Saturday Sessions: The Dermot O'Leary Show (2007)	Dermot O'Leary Presents The Saturday Sessions (2010)	Dermot O'Leary Presents The Saturday Sessions 2011 (2011)

Dermot O'Leary Presents The Saturday Sessions is a 2-disc compilation album of cover versions and acoustic versions from The Dermot O'Leary Show, which takes place every Saturday afternoon on BBC Radio 2, released in the United Kingdom in October 2010. Many of the artists featured were first introduced by British-Irish radio personality and television presenter, Dermot O'Leary. It hit Number 3 in the UK iTunes charts the week of its release.

== Track listing ==
Disc 1

1. Mumford & Sons - "The Cave"
2. Paolo Nutini - "Candy"
3. Biffy Clyro - "Fight For This Love" (originally by Cheryl Cole)
4. The Ting Tings - "Dub Be Good to Me" (originally by Beats International)
5. Florence And The Machine - "Rabbit Heart (Raise It Up)"
6. Ellie Goulding - "Jolene" (originally by Dolly Parton)
7. Fyfe Dangerfield - "Call The Shots" (originally by Girls Aloud)
8. Alesha Dixon - "Son Of A Preacher Man" (originally by Dusty Springfield)
9. Keane - "Spiralling"
10. Lily Allen - "Womanizer" (originally by Britney Spears)
11. Athlete - "Bulletproof" (originally by La Roux)
12. Will Young - "Golden Slumbers" (originally by The Beatles)
13. Bat For Lashes - "Daniel"
14. The Leisure Society - "The Last Of The Melting Snow"
15. The Magic Numbers - "The Pulse"
16. Ben's Brother - "Poker Face" (originally by Lady Gaga)
17. The Dø - "On My Shoulders"
18. The Hoosiers - "Wonderful Life" (originally by Black)
19. Tom Baxter - "Back To Black" (originally by Amy Winehouse)
20. Scouting For Girls - "Rockin' All Over The World" (originally by Status Quo)

Disc 2

1. Elbow - "Grounds For Divorce"
2. Paloma Faith - "New York"
3. Kasabian - "Empire"
4. Supergrass - "Beat It" (originally by Michael Jackson)
5. Doves - "Kingdom Of Rust"
6. Lissie - "Nothing Else Matters" (originally by Metallica)
7. The Divine Comedy - "Time To Pretend" (originally by MGMT)
8. Sia - "Day Too Soon"
9. Ed Harcourt - "50 Ways To Leave Your Lover" (originally by Paul Simon)
10. Editors - "It Ain't Me Babe" (originally by Bob Dylan)
11. Scott Matthews - "Elusive"
12. Alex Cornish - "Brothers In Arms" (originally by Dire Straits)
13. Turin Brakes - "Sea Change"
14. Imogen Heap - "Thriller" (originally by Michael Jackson)
15. Gossip - "Heavy Cross"
16. White Rabbits - "Kid On My Shoulders"
17. Lisa Hannigan - "Playground Love" (originally by Air)
18. The Temper Trap - "Sweet Disposition"
19. Cerys Matthews - "Love Me Tender" (originally by Elvis Presley)
20. Amy Winehouse - "Rehab"
