= Dermot O'Leary Presents The Saturday Sessions 2015 =

Compilation album by Various artists
- Released: 15 June 2015 (UK)
- Genre: Various
- Label: EMI

Various artists chronology
The Saturday Sessions From The Dermot O'Leary Show (2014)	Dermot O'Leary Presents The Saturday Sessions 2015 (2015)	Dermot O'Leary Presents The Saturday Sessions 2016 (2016)

Dermot O'Leary Presents The Saturday Sessions 2015 is a 2-disc compilation album, a collection from BBC Radio 2's new music programme, which takes place every Saturday afternoon on BBC Radio 2, released in the United Kingdom in June 2015. Many of the artists featured were first introduced by English radio personality and television presenter, Dermot O'Leary. It hit Number 2 in the UK iTunes charts the week of its release.

== Track listing ==
Disc 1

1. Sam Smith - "My Funny Valentine" (originally by Ella Fitzgerald)
2. Hozier - "Whole Lotta Love" (originally by Led Zeppelin)
3. George Ezra - "Girl from the North Country" (originally by Bob Dylan)
4. James Bay - "If I Ain't Got You" (originally by Alicia Keys)
5. Paloma Faith - "Crazy Love" (originally by Van Morrison)
6. Labrinth - "Thinking Out Loud" (originally by Ed Sheeran)
7. Will Young - "Take My Breath Away" (originally by Berlin)
8. Rita Ora - "You Are Everything"/"Ain't No Mountain High Enough" (originally by Diana Ross & Marvin Gaye/Marvin Gaye & Tammi Terrell)
9. Ella Henderson - "Hold Back The River" (originally by James Bay)
10. Ellie Goulding - "How Long Will I Love You" (originally by The Waterboys)
11. Ben Howard - "I Forget Where We Were"
12. Jessie Ware - "That's All I Want From You" (originally by Nina Simone)
13. London Grammar - "Strong"
14. The Choir of Virgin Angels Featuring Charlotte OC & Arthur Beatrice - "Dress You Up" (originally by Madonna)
15. Tom Odell - "I Think It's Going To Rain Today" (originally by Randy Newman)
16. Andreya Triana - "Everything You Never Had Pt. II"
17. Morcheeba - "The Sea"
18. Rudimental - "Free"
19. Ella Eyre - "Good Luck" (originally by Basement Jaxx)
20. Clean Bandit - "Show Me Love" (originally by Robin S)

Disc 2

1. Slash Featuring Myles Kennedy - "Sweet Child O' Mine" (originally by Guns N' Roses)
2. Elbow - "My Sad Captains"
3. Damon Albarn - "Seasons In The Sun" (originally by Terry Jacks)
4. Jamie T - "Out Of Time" (originally by Blur)
5. Villagers - "Nobody Does It Better" (originally by Carly Simon)
6. Josh Pyke - "Chandelier" (originally by Sia)
7. Cherry Ghost - "Stay With Me" (originally by Sam Smith)
8. Catfish and the Bottlemen - "Someday" (originally by The Strokes)
9. Nick Mulvey - "Cucurucu"
10. Camera Obscura - "I'm Not In Love" (originally by 10cc)
11. King Creosote - "Believe" (originally by Cher)
12. Kwabs - "Jealous Guy" (originally by John Lennon)
13. Biffy Clyro - "Biblical"
14. The Staves - "I'm On Fire" (originally by Bruce Springsteen)
15. Annie Eve - "This Time Tomorrow" (originally by The Kinks)
16. Rae Morris - "Moonage Daydream" (originally by David Bowie)
17. Seafret - "Oceans"
18. Bear's Den - "Above The Clouds Of Pompeii"
19. The Dø - "Instant Crush" (originally by Daft Punk Feat. Julian Casablancas)
20. The Levellers - "SOS" (originally by ABBA)
