= The Graduate (Nerina Pallot album) =

Studio album by Nerina Pallot
- Released: 5 October 2009
- Recorded: 2008–2009; London, United Kingdom
- Label: Idaho, Echo
- Producer: Nerina Pallot, The Chatterleys

Nerina Pallot chronology
Fires (2006)	The Graduate (2009)	Year of the Wolf (2011)

Singles from The Graduate
- 1. "Real Late Starter" Released: 19 October 2009; 2. "I Don't Want to Go Out" Released: 1 March 2010

The Graduate is the third studio album by London-born singer-songwriter Nerina Pallot, which was released in the United Kingdom on 5 October 2009. The album title refers to Pallot's 2009 graduation from university with a first-class honours English Literature degree.

Professional ratings
Review scores
Source	Rating
Allmusic	4/5 stars
Daily Express	4/5 stars
The Music Fix	8/10 stars

== Background and production ==
The album was released more than three years after the gold-selling Fires and marks a change in the musical genre for Pallot. According to her biography on her official MySpace page: "The Graduate has piano-driven songs high on happy pills, woozy electronics and beefed up bass. Where guitars would once have swooned, now they swagger and there is a new-found feistiness to Pallot’s emotive vocals."

The album was self-produced and recorded in the North London studio she shares with her husband, Grammy-nominated producer Andrew Chatterley.

Pallot's record label had originally sent her to the States to work with Linda Perry. The pair recorded two songs together before Pallot returned home. Then came sessions with Rob Davis and Rick Nowels with whom Pallot wrote 15 songs, none of which appear on The Graduate.

Pallot recalls: "I finally realised that, on my own, I was more honest and less self-conscious, and wrote my best songs."

At the same time, Pallot returned to Birmingham City University to complete the English degree she had started while making Fires: "I found the routine of studying literature and writing about it cleared my head and at the same time it was a real inspiration when it came to writing lyrics. It also required a lot of discipline – something I had seldom applied to other areas of my life!"

A major shift in Pallot's sound was down to the music she was listening to: "My tastes have definitely changed," she says. "I've come to really love good pop music. Like everyone else, I was bored stiff of singer/songwriters and wanted to find something fresh. The band I became obsessed with was MGMT. I was inspired by their attitude to making music. It's so creative. They just throw out lots of ideas, try out lots of mad sounds and have a laugh, but with the basis of really strong songs. I didn't want to think about what would get on the radio or what’s the trendy sound right now. I just went for it and had fun."

== Singles ==
The lead single from the album was "Real Late Starter", released on download and limited edition 7" vinyl on 28 September 2009. The music video for the song was directed by Marc Klasfeld, who previously directed Pallot's "Everybody's Gone to War" clip in 2006. Bolstered by a TV performance on The Alan Titchmarsh Show and several radio appearances, the song peaked at #29 on the UK Airplay Chart in October 2009. Despite not charting on the UK Singles Chart, the song peaked at #19 on the UK Indie Singles Chart.

A second download-only single, "I Don't Want to Go Out", followed on 1 March 2010. This single featured Pallot's cover of Lily Allen's "The Fear", and despite not charting officially, it peaked at #30 on the UK Airplay Chart in March 2010 - becoming Pallot's sixth successive UK Airplay Top 30 hit after "All Good People" (#21, August 2005), "Everybody's Gone to War" (#3, May 2006), "Sophia" (#12, October 2006), "Learning to Breathe" (#22, January 2007), and "Real Late Starter" (#29, October 2009).

== Track listing ==
Standard
No.	Title	Length
1.	"Everything's Illuminated!"	3:49
2.	"Real Late Starter"	3:22
3.	"The Right Side"	3:21
4.	"Human"	4:09
5.	"I Don't Want to Go Out"	3:28
6.	"Coming Home"	3:44
7.	"It Starts"	3:25
8.	"When Did I Become Such a Bitch"	3:38
9.	"Cigarette"	5:07
10.	"It Was Me"	4:16

iTunes bonus tracks
No.	Title	Length
11.	"English"	3:05
12.	"Junebug"	4:12
13.	"God of Small Things"	3:21

CD2 - Play.com exclusive
No.	Title	Length
1.	"It Starts" (acoustic)
2.	"Coming Home" (acoustic)
3.	"Human" (acoustic)
4.	"Everything's Illuminated!" (acoustic)
5.	"When Did I Become Such a Bitch" (acoustic)
6.	"The Right Side" (acoustic)
7.	"It Was Me" (acoustic)

NerinaPallot.tv free download
No.	Title	Length
1.	"The following tracks were made available to download from Pallot's official site: "Heidi" (acoustic); "Long Tall Grass of Summer"; "Blue Christmas""

== Chart performance ==
The Graduate debuted at #46 on the UK albums chart in its first week, but fell out of the top 100 in its second week.
