= Ben's Brother =

English band

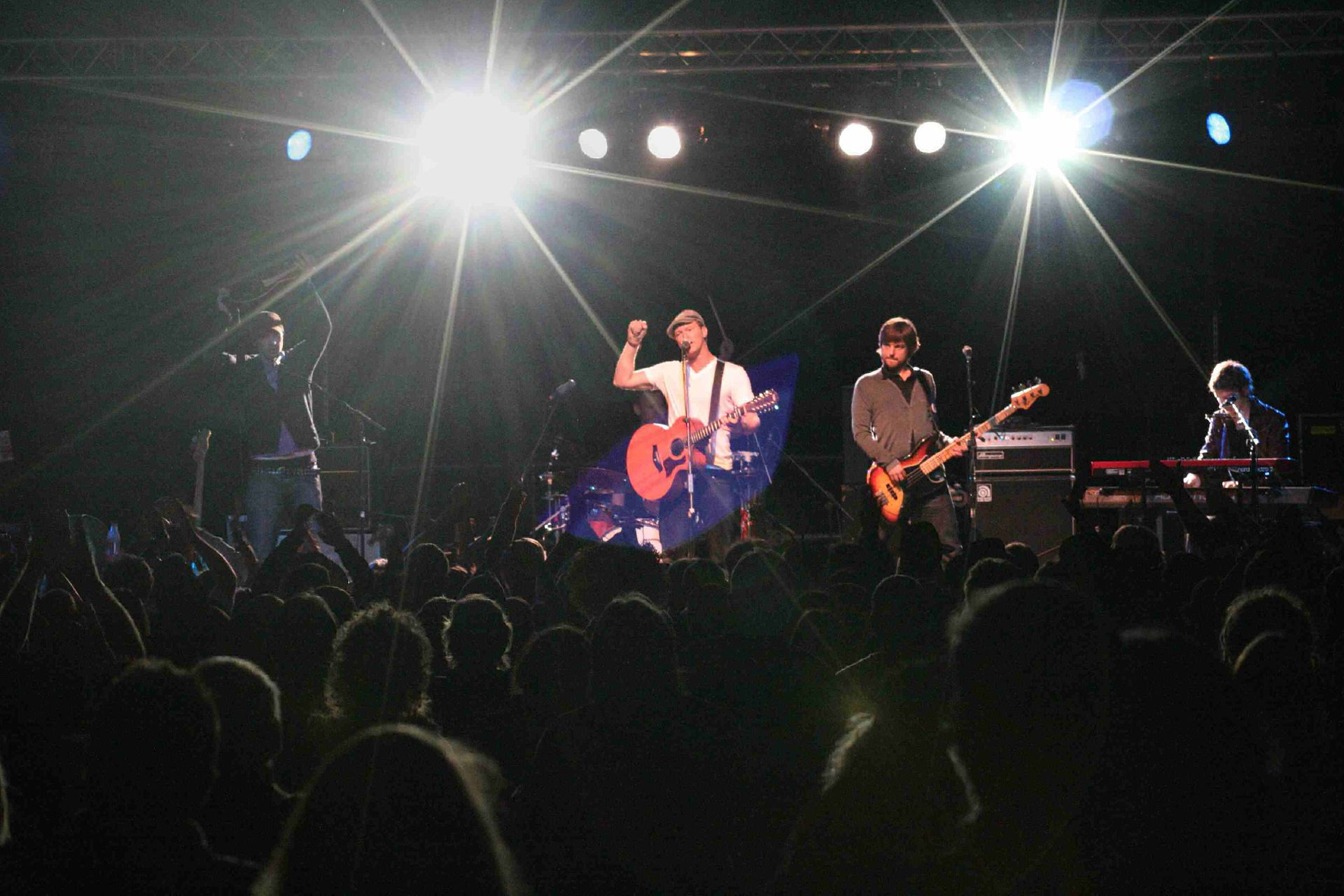
- Ben's Brother performing in 2007; Photo: Brian Marks

Background information
- Origin: London, England
- Genres: Post-Britpop; indie pop
- Years active: 2006–present
- Labels: Relentless; Island; Universal
- Members: Jamie Hartman; Kiris Houston; Karl Brazil; Malcolm Moore; Luke Potashnick

Ben's Brother are a five-piece English band, headed by founder Jamie Hartman. The band was named after Jamie's big brother Ben, whose shadow he lived in as a teenager. Their album Beta Male Fairytales reached number 14 on the UK album charts and their single Let Me Out was nominated for an Ivor Novello award for Best Song Musically and Lyrically in 2007 - the other nominee was Love Is Losing Game, by Amy Winehouse.

== Music career ==
Their debut album, Beta Male Fairytales, was released on 6 August 2007, and went to number 3 on iTunes UK and achieved Gold status. Successes followed in Europe and North and South America.

A song from their album, "God by Another Name", became the first iTunes Store free single of the week to be made available in the iTunes Plus format. Beginning in September 2007, their song "Stuttering" was featured in a Dentyne Ice commercial in Canada and the U.S. This turned into a larger partnership where the band gave away free songs to fans and flew a fan to see them play in Texas, via a specially created website.

The band made their American festival debut at South by Southwest in March 2008. That same year, the band were nominated for an Ivor Novello Award in the category of Best Song Musically and Lyrically for "Let Me Out".

Dropped by EMI, despite the Ivor Novello nomination and worldwide success of Beta Male Fairytales, the band formed their own label and recorded their second studio album in Autumn 2008. The first single from the album, "Apologise", was released in early 2009 and was co-written with Natalie Imbruglia (who recorded a version for her forthcoming album). The band was then signed to Island Records for the forthcoming singles from the album Battling Giants, which contains a duet with Anastacia, "Stalemate", and other vocal collaborations including Jason Mraz on the title track and Jack MacManus, Cass Lowe and Pete Gordeno doing group harmonies on the other tracks.

On 15 February 2010, Hartman announced via his Twitter page that the band would continue to release music without the support of the label Island Records. In 2016, the band released a single entitled "Honeybee" via YouTube and iTunes.

Band founder Hartman is the co-writer of the European wide hit single "Human" by Rag'n'Bone Man.

== Band members ==
- Jamie Hartman – vocals, guitars, keyboards
- Kiris Houston – keyboards, guitars
- Malcolm Moore – bass
- Karl Brazil – drums
- Luke Potashnick – guitars

== Discography ==
=== Studio albums ===
Title	Album details	Peak chart positions			
Title	Album details	UK	FRA	ITA	SCO
Beta Male Fairytales	Released: 2 July 2007; Label: Relentless (#REL14); Formats: CD	14	46	61	28
Battling Giants	Released: 11 May 2009; Label: Flat Cap (#2707347); Formats: CD	56	—	—	95
"—" denotes items that did not chart or were not released in that territory.

=== EPs ===
- Glow (25 April 2010) (UK )

=== Singles ===
Year	Title	Peak chart positions				Album
Year	Title	UK	FRA	ITA	SCO	Album
2007	"Beauty Queen / I Am Who I Am"	—	—	—	—	Beta Male Fairytales
2007	"Let Me Out"	38	43	8	36	Beta Male Fairytales
2007	"Carry On"	169	—	—	—	Beta Male Fairytales
2008	"Stuttering (Kiss Me Again)"	41	—	—	14	Beta Male Fairytales (Reissue)
2009	"Apologise"	141	—	—	—	Battling Giants
2009	"Q & A"	—	—	—	—	Battling Giants
2009	"Stalemate" (featuring Anastacia)	—	—	—	—	Battling Giants
2009	"Shine/Reacender" (featuring Roupa Nova)	—	—	—	—	Non-album single
2010	"What If I?"	153	—	—	—	Battling Giants
2016	"Honeybee"	—	—	—	—	Non-album single
2021	"Better Than This"	—	—	—	—	Non-album single
"—" denotes items that did not chart or were not released in that territory.

== Other appearances ==
List of guest appearances, showing year released and album name
Title	Year	Album
"Poker Face"	2010	Dermot O'Leary Presents The Saturday Sessions
