= Dermot O'Leary Presents The Saturday Sessions 2013 =

Compilation album by Various artists
- Released: 18 February 2013 (UK)
- Genre: Various
- Label: EMI

Various artists chronology
Dermot O'Leary Presents The Saturday Sessions 2011 (2011)	Dermot O'Leary Presents The Saturday Sessions 2013 (2013)	The Saturday Sessions From The Dermot O'Leary Show (2014)

Dermot O'Leary Presents The Saturday Sessions 2013 is a 2-disc compilation album where musicians perform acoustic sessions and specially recorded covers, which takes place every Saturday afternoon on BBC Radio 2, released in the United Kingdom in February 2013. Many of the artists featured were first introduced by English radio personality and television presenter, Dermot O'Leary. It hit Number 2 in the UK iTunes charts the week of its release.

== Track listing ==
Disc 1

1. Emeli Sande - "Eleanor Rigby" (originally by The Beatles)
2. Ed Sheeran - "Who You Are" (originally by Jessie J)
3. Florence And The Machine - "Never Let Me Go"
4. Robbie Williams - "Candy"
5. Will Young - "Hanging On The Telephone" (originally by Blondie)
6. Paloma Faith - "Into My Arms" (originally by Nick Cave)
7. Ben Howard - "Old Pine"
8. Bat for Lashes - "Laura"
9. Bastille - "Blue Jeans" (originally by Lana Del Rey)
10. Laura Mvula - "Green Garden"
11. Ren Harvieu - "Love Is A Melody"
12. Lucy Rose - "Middle Of The Bed"
13. Scouting For Girls - "You Got the Style" (originally by Athlete)
14. The Slow Show - "Born To Run" (originally by Bruce Springsteen)
15. Rachel Sermanni - "I Want You Back" (originally by The Jackson 5)
16. The Dø - "Sex On Fire" (originally by Kings Of Leon)
17. Kodaline - "All I Want"
18. Kristina Train - "Dark Black"
19. Jessie J - "Price Tag"
20. Tom Jones - "Tower Of Song" (originally by Leonard Cohen)

Disc 2

1. Plan B - "Song 2" (originally by Blur)
2. Maverick Sabre - "Empire State Of Mind" (originally by Alicia Keys)
3. Alt-J - "Tessellate"
4. Alex Clare - "Damn Your Eyes" (originally by Etta James)
5. The Maccabees - "Chariots Of Fire" (originally by Vangelis)
6. The XX - "Angels"
7. Michael Kiwanuka - "May This Be Love" (originally by The Jimi Hendrix Experience)
8. Maxïmo Park - "Heaven" (originally by Emeli Sandé)
9. The Shins - "Simple Song"
10. Electric Guest - "This Head I Hold"
11. The Civil Wars - "Dance Me to the End of Love" (originally by Leonard Cohen)
12. James Blake - "A Case Of You" (originally by Joni Mitchell)
13. Miles Kane - "Play With Fire" (originally by The Rolling Stones)
14. Dry The River - "Homeward Bound" (originally by Simon & Garfunkel)
15. Dawes - "Time Spent In Los Angeles"
16. The Milk - "Ooh Baby Baby" (originally by Smokey Robinson and the Miracles)
17. Kasabian - "Days Are Forgotten"
18. Manic Street Preachers - "Your Love Alone Is Not Enough"
19. Athlete - "Wires"
