= Slash (album) =

Studio album by Slash
- Released: March 31, 2010
- Recorded: March 4 – November 4, 2009
- Studio: Barefoot Recording Studio
- Genres: Hard rock, heavy metal
- Length: 60:29
- Labels: EMI, Universal, Roadrunner, Sony Music
- Producers: Eric Valentine; Kid Rock; Big Chris Flores

Slash chronology
Slash (2010)	Live in Manchester (2010)

Singles from Slash
- 1. "Sahara" Released: November 11, 2009; 2. "By the Sword" Released: March 16, 2010; 3. "Beautiful Dangerous" Released: October 28, 2010

Slash is the debut solo studio album by American rock and roll musician Slash, best known as the lead guitarist of Guns N' Roses. Released in 2010, the album was produced by Eric Valentine and features multiple musicians, including four of the five members of the Appetite for Destruction-era Guns N' Roses lineup: Slash himself, Izzy Stradlin, Duff McKagan and Steven Adler.

== History and recording ==
In his 2007 autobiography, Slash mentioned he was planning a solo album, and listed some of the vocalists with whom he would like to work. He stated that the album would be called Slash & Friends (although & Friends was later dropped from the title). Slash's wife Perla mentioned in a 2008 interview that the album would include "everyone from Ozzy Osbourne to Fergie".

The song "Crazy" featuring Chester Bennington was recorded for the album but was blocked to avoid conflict with a pending release by Bennington's group Linkin Park; A Thousand Suns was released a few months later after Slash's album was issued. Slash re-rerecorded the song with Lemmy on vocals as "Doctor Alibi". Slash reported rights to "Crazy" were owned by Bennington's family after his 2017 suicide, with any possible release of the song needing their approval.

On November 11, 2009, preceding the release of the album, Slash released the Japan-only single "Sahara", featuring Japanese vocalist Koshi Inaba (from B'z) who contributed Japanese and English lyrics. It charted at number four on the Oricon Singles Chart, as well number six on the Billboard Japan Hot 100 and number four on the Top Singles Sales chart. It has been awarded Western "Single of the Year" award at the 24th Japan Gold Disc Award by RIAJ.

On January 16, Slash made an appearance at the NAMM Show. On January 19, 2010, Slash teamed up with Linkin Park's Music for Relief, along with Alanis Morissette, The All-American Rejects and others, and donated a previously unreleased track, "Mother Maria" featuring Beth Hart, to aid the victims of the earthquake in Haiti. The song was later featured as an iTunes bonus track for the record, and appeared on a Platinum Deluxe Edition.

Just prior to release, the song "Back from Cali" featuring singer Myles Kennedy was added to the album's track listing, making Kennedy the only person to be featured on more than one song on the album's standard track listing. Slash also announced that Izzy Stradlin is the only other person who played guitar on the record, performing rhythm guitar on the song "Ghost", featuring singer Ian Astbury. "I Hold On" was featured on the season one episode of Hawaii Five-0, "Malama Ka Aina", which aired on October 4, 2010; it was featured as characters Steve and Danny drive to a pizza shop.

The album was made available in the United States via EMI, and in the U.K. via Roadrunner. The cover art was produced from a painting by Ron English, a prominent Pop Surrealist artist and friend of Slash.

Best Buy released an exclusive version including the album and a Slash T-shirt. Best Buy also sells an exclusive digital version of the album that includes two bonus tracks: "Baby Can't Drive" (featuring Alice Cooper/Nicole Scherzinger/Steven Adler/Flea) and a cover of Guns N' Roses' "Paradise City" (featuring Fergie/Cypress Hill).

In an interview following the release of the record, Slash revealed that he would have wanted Thom Yorke to sing "Saint Is a Sinner Too" but that he was too nervous to call the Radiohead singer. In a later interview with the Finnish Soundi magazine, Slash stated that he would have wanted the record to feature his friend, former-Hanoi Rocks lead singer Michael Monroe, but there was not a song that Slash thought fit him.

As of April 18, 2010, the album has gone gold in Australia.

A music video for the remix version of "Gotten" featuring Adam Levine, released in March 2012. The video was part of the donation for the Los Angeles Youth Network.

== 2010 World Tour ==
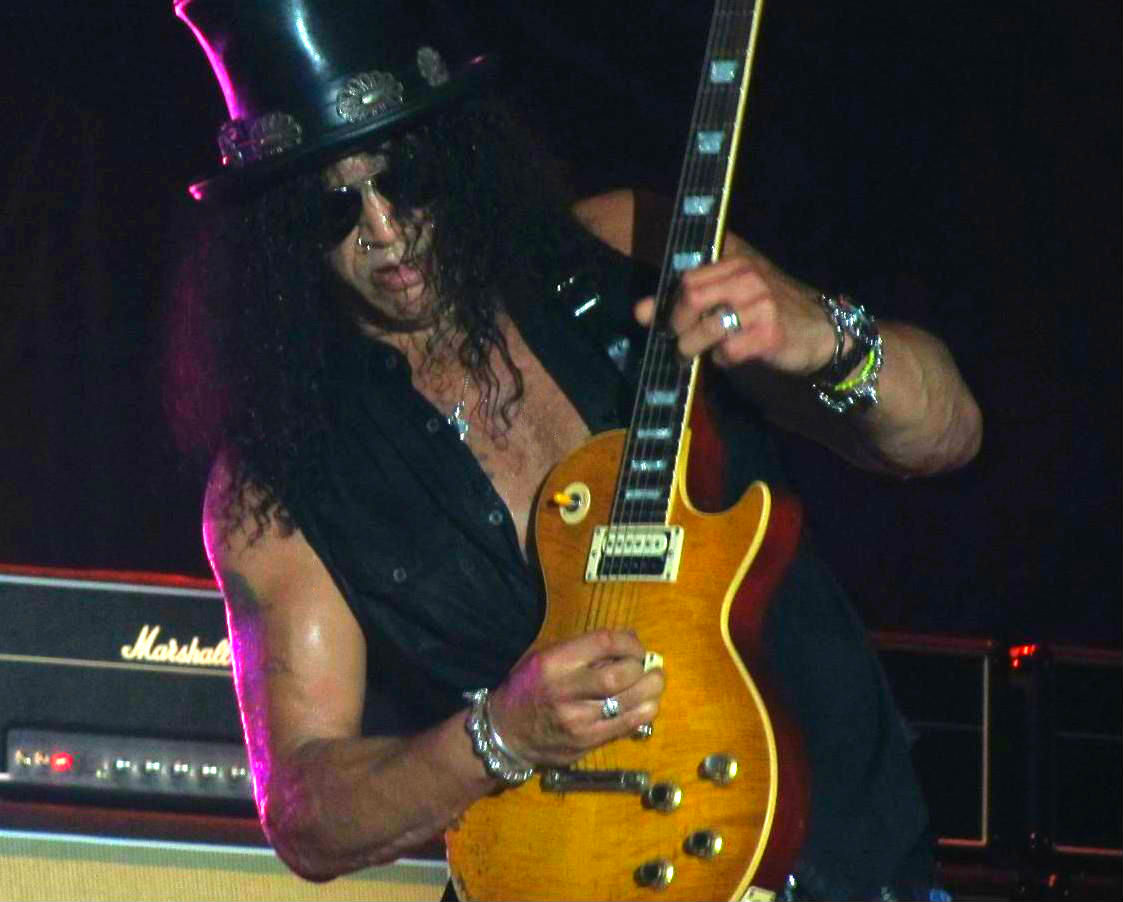
Slash during a concert in Rome on July 29, 2011

On February 4, 2010, Slash announced via a MySpace blog that "Myles Kennedy is going to be fronting the band for the upcoming tour. Something I'm really stoked about. Myles sang a killer track on the record and I think he is by far one of the best rock and roll singers out there today. I'm really honored and proud to be working with him." Prior to the tour, Slash confirmed that his own solo material and songs from Guns N' Roses ("Civil War", "Sweet Child O' Mine", and "Nightrain" among others), Velvet Revolver, and Slash's Snakepit, as well as Alter Bridge material ("Rise Today") would be played.

The touring line-up for the initial tour, besides Slash and Myles Kennedy included Bobby Schneck (Slash's Blues Ball) on rhythm guitar, Brent Fitz (Alice Cooper) on drums and, initially, Dave Henning (Big Wreck) on bass, though prior to the start of the tour Todd Kerns (Age of Electric, Static in Stereo, Sin City Sinners) took over bass duties instead of Dave Henning.

Slash performed "By the Sword" on The Tonight Show with Jay Leno on April 6, and on The Late Late Show with Craig Ferguson on April 9. While performing the song on Jay Leno's show, Slash was wearing an "I'm With Coco" pin, to show support for former Tonight Show host Conan O'Brien. There are very few close-ups of Slash during the song, but TMZ caught one second where the pin was displayed on camera. Slash also played "By the Sword" on Lopez Tonight on April 9, 2010, and performed "Back from Cali" on the show on April 12. Slash and Adam Levine performed "Gotten" on The Ellen DeGeneres Show on May 11.

== Release and reception ==
Professional ratings
Aggregate scores
Source	Rating
Metacritic	56/100
Review scores
Source	Rating
AllMusic	2/5 stars
Classic Rock	9/10
The Guardian	3/5 stars
Los Angeles Times	2/4 stars
Mojo	3/5 stars
musicOMH	4/5 stars
NME	7/10
Now	3/5 stars
PopMatters	4/10
Q	3/5 stars

Upon release, Slash entered the Billboard 200 charts at number 3 (also at number one on the Rock, Hard Rock, Digital and the Independent Albums Chart) with 61,000 copies sold during the first week. The album also debuted at number one in Canada, Austria, New Zealand and Sweden while it also broke into the top 20 in Germany, Finland, Australia, France, Norway, Poland and Switzerland.

The album's first single, "By the Sword" featuring Andrew Stockdale, peaked at number 41 on the Rock Songs Chart and number 78 on the Canadian Hot 100. "Beautiful Dangerous", featuring Fergie, charted at number 11 and number 58 on the Heatseekers Songs and Canadian Hot 100. The cover of "Paradise City" featuring Fergie and Cypress Hill also charted on the Canadian Hot 100 at number 75.

The album has received generally mixed-to-positive reviews, scoring a 56 out of 100 ("mixed or average reviews") on Metacritic. MTV News writer Kyle Anderson called the album "a tremendous collection of hard rock songs that center around the axe man's signature chunky, swirling riffs.... On balance, it's an excellent album, and it feels good to have that classic Slash sound back."

Writer Shelby Powell took note of Slash's precision on guitar, rating the album 3.5/5 thumbs, but took off points for "a little too much reverence paid to the 90s and some of the feature selections may have old head purists poking their bottom lips out and putting their lighters down," but concludes that "the assortment of genres blends well."

== Track listing ==
Standard edition
No.	Title	Writer(s)	Lead vocals	Length
1.	"Ghost"	Slash, Ian Astbury	Ian Astbury	3:34
2.	"Crucify the Dead"	Slash, Ozzy Osbourne, Kevin Churko	Ozzy Osbourne	4:04
3.	"Beautiful Dangerous"	Slash, Fergie	Fergie	4:41
4.	"Back from Cali"	Slash, Myles Kennedy	Myles Kennedy	3:35
5.	"Promise"	Slash, Chris Cornell	Chris Cornell	4:41
6.	"By the Sword"	Slash, Andrew Stockdale	Andrew Stockdale	4:50
7.	"Gotten"	Slash, Adam Levine	Adam Levine	5:05
8.	"Doctor Alibi"	Slash, Lemmy Kilmister	Lemmy Kilmister	3:07
9.	"Watch This*"	Slash	Dave Grohl, Duff McKagan	3:46
10.	"I Hold On"	Slash, Kid Rock	Kid Rock	4:10
11.	"Nothing to Say**"	Slash, M. Shadows	M. Shadows	5:27
12.	"Starlight"	Slash, Kennedy	Myles Kennedy	5:25
13.	"Saint Is a Sinner Too"	Slash, Rocco Deluca	Rocco Deluca	3:28
14.	"We're All Gonna Die"	Slash, Iggy Pop	Iggy Pop	4:30

Japanese edition
No.	Title	Writer(s)	Length
15.	"Sahara" (feat. Koshi Inaba)	Slash, Inaba	4:00

Japanese deluxe edition
No.	Title	Writer(s)	Length
15.	"Sahara" (feat. Koshi Inaba)	Slash, Inaba	4:00
16.	"(Bonus DVD) Making of the Album"

Australian deluxe edition
No.	Title	Writer(s)	Length
15.	"Paradise City" (feat. Cypress Hill & Fergie)	Axl Rose, Slash, McKagan, Izzy Stradlin, Steven Adler	5:14
16.	"Back from Cali (Acoustic)" (feat. Myles Kennedy)	Slash, Kennedy	3:42
17.	"Sweet Child o' Mine (Acoustic)" (feat. Myles Kennedy)	Rose, Slash, Stradlin	6:02
18.	"(Bonus DVD) Making of the Album"
19.	"(Bonus DVD) By the Sword (Music Video)"
20.	"(Bonus DVD) Behind the Scenes from the Video for 'By the Sword' (Part 1 & 2)"
21.	"(Bonus DVD) Back from Cali feat. Myles Kennedy (Live)"
22.	"(Bonus DVD) By the Sword feat. Andrew Stockdale (Live)"
23.	"(Bonus DVD) Nice Boys feat. Angry Anderson (Live)"
24.	"(Bonus DVD) Starlight feat. Myles Kennedy (Live)"
25.	"(Bonus DVD) By the Sword (Side-by-Side Simulated 3D Version)"

Australian iTunes edition
No.	Title	Writer(s)	Length
15.	"Paradise City" (feat. Cypress Hill & Fergie)	Rose, Slash, McKagan, Stradlin, Adler	5:14
16.	"Chains and Shackles**" (feat. Nick Oliveri) (pre-order only)	Slash, Nick Oliveri	4:28

Deluxe edition
No.	Title	Writer(s)	Length
15.	"Sahara (English version)" (feat. Koshi Inaba)	Slash, Inaba	3:58
16.	"Paradise City" (feat. Cypress Hill & Fergie)	Rose, Slash, McKagan, Stradlin, Adler	5:14
17.	"Mother Maria" (feat. Beth Hart)	Slash, Hart	5:27
18.	"Baby Can't Drive" (feat. Alice Cooper, Nicole Scherzinger, Steven Adler, & Flea)	Slash, Alice Cooper, Nicole Scherzinger	3:20
19.	"Sahara" (feat. Koshi Inaba)	Slash, Inaba	4:00
20.	"Beautiful Dangerous (Radio Mix)" (feat. Fergie)	Slash, Fergie	4:11
21.	"Demo #4"	Slash	3:52
22.	"Demo #16"	Slash	3:23
23.	"Back from Cali (acoustic)" (feat. Myles Kennedy)	Slash, Kennedy	3:42
24.	"Fall to Pieces (acoustic)" (feat. Myles Kennedy)	Scott Weiland	4:29
25.	"Sweet Child o' Mine (acoustic)" (feat. Myles Kennedy)	Rose, Slash, McKagan, Stradlin, Adler	6:02
26.	"Watch This* (Live)"	Slash	3:44
27.	"Nightrain (Live)" (feat. Myles Kennedy)	Rose, Slash, McKagan, Stradlin, Adler	5:00
28.	"(Bonus DVD) Making of the Album"
29.	"(Bonus DVD) Back From Cali feat. Myles Kennedy (Live)"
30.	"(Bonus DVD) By The Sword (Music Video)"
31.	"(Bonus DVD) Behind The Scenes of 'By The Sword'"
32.	"(Bonus DVD) Starlight feat. Myles Kennedy (Live)"
33.	"(Bonus DVD) Mean Bone feat. Myles Kennedy (Live)"
34.	"(Bonus DVD) Track-By-Track Interview with Slash"

Monster Energy Drink edition
No.	Title	Writer(s)	Length
15.	"Chains and Shackles**" (feat. Nick Oliveri)	Slash, Oliveri	4:28

Best Buy/Napster & Latin America editions
No.	Title	Writer(s)	Length
15.	"Paradise City" (feat. Cypress Hill & Fergie)	Rose, Slash, McKagan, Stradlin, Adler	5:14
16.	"Baby Can't Drive" (feat. Alice Cooper, Nicole Scherzinger, Steven Adler, & Flea)	Slash, Cooper, Scherzinger	3:20

iTunes edition
No.	Title	Writer(s)	Length
15.	"Mother Maria" (feat. Beth Hart)	Slash, Hart	5:27
16.	"Sahara (English version)" (feat. Koshi Inaba) (pre-order only)	Slash, Inaba	3:58

Canadian deluxe edition
No.	Title	Writer(s)	Length
15.	"Sahara (English version)" (feat. Koshi Inaba)	Slash, Inaba	3:58
16.	"Baby Can't Drive" (feat. Alice Cooper, Nicole Scherzinger, Steven Adler, & Flea)	Slash, Cooper, Scherzinger	3:20
17.	"Paradise City" (feat. Cypress Hill & Fergie)	Rose, Slash, McKagan, Stradlin, Adler	5:14

Classic Rock Slashpack edition
No.	Title	Writer(s)	Length
15.	"Baby Can't Drive" (feat. Alice Cooper, Nicole Scherzinger, Steven Adler, & Flea)	Slash, Cooper, Scherzinger	3:20

Vinyl edition
No.	Title	Writer(s)	Length
15.	"Sahara" (feat. Koshi Inaba)	Slash, Inaba	4:00
16.	"Baby Can't Drive" (feat. Alice Cooper, Nicole Scherzinger, Steven Adler, & Flea)	Slash, Cooper, Scherzinger	3:20

Notes:
*Different countries list the track title as "Watch This Dave".
**"Nothing to Say" and "Chains and Shackles" are two versions of the same song with different lyrics and production.

== Personnel ==
Primary musicians

- Slash – lead and rhythm guitars, acoustic guitar on "By the Sword", lead acoustic guitar on "Saint is a Sinner Too" and "Sweet Child o' Mine", backing vocals on "Paradise City", bass on "Demo #4" and "Demo #16", production (all tracks)
- Chris Chaney – bass (excluding track 9, "Chains and Shackles" and "Baby Can't Drive"), rhythm acoustic guitar on "Saint is a Sinner Too"
- Josh Freese – drums (excluding tracks 9, 12 and "Baby Can't Drive"), percussion on "Saint is a Sinner Too"
- Lenny Castro – percussion (excluding tracks 1, 8, 9, 11, 12, 13, "Chains and Shackles" and "Mother Maria")

Production personnel

- Eric Valentine – production, engineering, mixing, keyboards on "I Hold On", backing vocals on "Mother Maria", percussion on "Mother Maria"
- Bradley Cook – additional engineering
- Big Chris Flores – additional production, keyboards & programming on "Beautiful Dangerous", drum programming on "Demo #4" "Demo #16"
- Mastering: George Marino at Sterling Sound

Featured guests

- Ian Astbury – vocals, percussion, production (track 1)
- Ozzy Osbourne – vocals, production (track 2)
- Fergie – vocals, production (track 3 and Paradise City)
- Myles Kennedy – vocals, production (tracks 4, 12, "Back from Cali" (acoustic version), "Fall to Pieces" (acoustic version), "Sweet Child o' Mine" acoustic version, "Nightrain" (live version)), rhythm guitar ("Back from Cali" (acoustic version), "Fall to Pieces" (acoustic version), "Sweet Child o' Mine" (acoustic version), "Watch This" (live version))
- Chris Cornell – vocals, production (track 5)
- Andrew Stockdale – vocals, production (track 6)
- Adam Levine – vocals, production (track 7)
- Lemmy Kilmister – vocals, bass, production (track 8)
- Dave Grohl – drums, production (track 9)
- Duff McKagan – bass, choir, production (track 9)
- Kid Rock – vocals, production (track 10)
- M. Shadows – vocals, production (track 11)
- Rocco DeLuca – vocals, production (track 13)
- Iggy Pop – vocals, production (track 14)
- Koshi Inaba – vocals, production (Sahara)
- Cypress Hill – vocals (Paradise City)
- Nick Oliveri – vocals, bass, production (Chains and Shackles)
- Beth Hart – vocals, piano, production (Mother Maria)
- Alice Cooper – vocals, production (Baby Can't Drive)
- Nicole Scherzinger – vocals, production (Baby Can't Drive)

Additional musicians

- Izzy Stradlin – rhythm guitar (track 1)
- Taylor Hawkins – backing vocals (track 2)
- Kevin Churko – backing vocals, production (track 2)
- Joe Sandt – harpsichord (track 5)
- Deron Johnson – organ (track 7)
- Anton Patzner – violin, viola (track 7)
- Lewis Patzner – cello (track 7)
- Mark Robertson – violin (track 7)
- Alyssa Park – violin (track 7)
- Julie Rogers – violin (track 7)
- Sam Fischer – violin (track 7)
- Grace Oh – violin (track 7)
- Songa Lee – violin (track 7)
- Maia Jasper – violin (track 7)
- Lisa Liu – violin (track 7)
- Steve Ferrone – drums (track 12)
- Steven Adler – drums (Baby Can't Drive)
- Flea – bass (Baby Can't Drive)
- Franky Perez – backing vocals (Paradise City)
- Bobby Schneck – rhythm guitar (Watch This (live version) and Nightrain (live version))
- Todd Kerns – bass, backing vocals (Watch This (live version) and Nightrain (live version))
- Brent Fitz – drums (Watch This (live version) and Nightrain (live version))

== Release history ==
Region	Release date	Format	Label	Catalogue
Japan	March 31, 2010	CD, Digital download	Universal Music	UICE1156
Malaysia	April 1, 2010	CD, Digital download	Universal Music	
Australia	April 1, 2010	CD, Digital download	Sony Music	88697675922
Spain	April 5, 2010	CD, Digital download	Roadrunner Records	
France	April 5, 2010	CD, Digital download	Roadrunner Records	
United States	April 6, 2010	CD, Digital download	EMI	31433
Canada	April 6, 2010	CD, Digital download	EMI	
United Kingdom	April 7, 2010	Classic Rock Slashpack	Roadrunner Records	
United Kingdom	April 2, 2010	CD, Digital download	Roadrunner Records	RR77952
Germany	April 9, 2010	CD, Digital download	Roadrunner Records	
Brazil	April 30, 2010	CD, Digital download	Music Brokers	7798141333530

== Miscellaneous ==
- Slash worked on a song with Steven Tyler which has not been released.
- Ozzy Osbourne said he wrote "Crucify the Dead" lyrics about what he would tell Axl Rose if he was in Slash's shoes.
- "I Hold On" was recorded in Kid Rock's personal studio.
- Slash originally wrote the guitar part of "Beautiful Dangerous" for his score to the film This Is Not a Movie.
- "We're All Gonna Die", featuring Iggy Pop, was the first song Slash recorded.
- "Mother Maria" was first used for Download to Donate for Haiti, a compilation album to earthquake victims in Haiti.

== Charts ==
Chart (2010)	Peak position
Australian Albums (ARIA)	3
Austrian Albums (Ö3 Austria)	1
Belgian Albums (Ultratop Flanders)	38
Belgian Albums (Ultratop Wallonia)	35
Canadian Albums (Billboard)	1
Danish Albums (Hitlisten)	4
Dutch Albums (Album Top 100)	17
Finnish Albums (Suomen virallinen lista)	2
French Albums (SNEP)	17
German Albums (Offizielle Top 100)	4
Hungarian Albums (MAHASZ)	12
Irish Albums (IRMA)	24
Italian Albums (FIMI)	6
Japanese Albums (Oricon)	7
New Zealand Albums (RMNZ)	1
Norwegian Albums (VG-lista)	4
Portuguese Albums (AFP)	27
Scottish Albums (Official Charts)	12
Spanish Albums (Promusicae)	26
Swedish Albums (Sverigetopplistan)	1
Swiss Albums (Schweizer Hitparade)	3
UK Albums (Official Charts)	17
UK Rock & Metal Albums (Official Charts)	1
US Billboard 200	3
US Independent Albums (Billboard)	1
US Top Hard Rock Albums (Billboard)	1
US Top Rock Albums (Billboard)	1
US Indie Store Album Sales (Billboard)	4

== Certifications ==
Region	Certification	Certified units/sales
Australia (ARIA)	Platinum	70,000^{^}
Canada (Music Canada)	Platinum	80,000^{^}
New Zealand (RMNZ)	Platinum	15,000^{^}
United Kingdom (BPI)	Gold	100,000^{^}
^{^} Shipments figures based on certification alone.
