= By the Sword (song) =

Single by Slash featuring Andrew Stockdale

from the album Slash
- Released: March 16, 2010
- Recorded: March 4–August 17, 2009
- Genre: Hard rock, blues rock
- Length: 4:50
- Label: EMI / Roadrunner
- Songwriter(s): Slash; Andrew Stockdale
- Producer(s): Eric Valentine

Slash singles chronology
"Sahara" (2009)	"By the Sword" (2010)	"Rockstar 101" (2010)

"By the Sword" is the first official single from the album Slash by former Velvet Revolver and current Guns N' Roses lead guitarist Slash. It features Andrew Stockdale of Wolfmother on vocals and was released as a digital single on March 16, 2010. It was released in the UK on March 28, 2010. The cover was drawn by Ralph Steadman.

The song was premiered on February 26, 2010, on spinner.com.

The song was debuted live for the first time on November 22, 2009, at the Slash & friends performance, where Slash was joined by Andrew Stockdale to play the song live, along with Dave Navarro, Chris Chaney and Travis Barker.

In April 2010, both Slash and Andrew Stockdale performed the song live on The Tonight Show, Lopez Tonight, and The Late Late Show with Craig Ferguson.

It was also performed by Wolfmother with Slash as a special guest in Los Angeles on November 24, 2009 and without Slash in Italy on June 7, 2011

== Charts ==
Chart (2010)	Peak position
US Hot Rock & Alternative Songs (Billboard)	41

== Personnel ==
- Slash - guitars
- Andrew Stockdale - lead vocals
- Chris Chaney - bass
- Josh Freese - drums
- Lenny Castro - percussion

== See also ==
- "Sahara" (single)
