= Cucurucu (song) =

Single by Nick Mulvey

from the album First Mind
- Released: 3 March 2014
- Length: 4:26
- Songwriter(s): Nick Mulvey

Nick Mulvey singles chronology
"Nitrous" (2013)	"Cucurucu" (2014)

"Cucurucu" is a song by English musician Nick Mulvey. The song was released on 3 March 2014.

Mulvey told The Cambridge News that the song's title is meaningless. "It's meant to be a noise a child would make," he explained. "It might relate to a bird sound too. It's actually quite similar to the noise they make in France for a cockerel. You know how we say 'cock-a-doodle-do'? Over there it's like that Cucurucu."

"At its core it's my adaptation of DH Lawrence's poem Piano," Mulvey added. "The poem depicts a child under the piano, smiling as its mother sings, so I thought it would be lovely to have a song within the song. So I'm singing in her voice, really, and then I got the chorus about 'yearning to belong', so it's not just putting his words to my music. At first I was bothered by that, because I didn't think I should've changed it, but I've got used to it."

== Track listings ==
- Digital download
1. "Cucurucu" – 4:26

== Charts ==
Chart (2014)	Peak position
Belgium (Ultratip Bubbling Under Flanders)	81
Scotland (OCC)	30
UK Singles (OCC)	26

== Certifications ==
Region	Certification	Certified units/sales
United Kingdom (BPI)	Silver	200,000^{‡}
^{‡} Sales+streaming figures based on certification alone.

== Release history ==
Region	Date	Format(s)	Label
United Kingdom	3 March 2014	digital download	
