= Big Chris Flores =

American musician (born 1970)

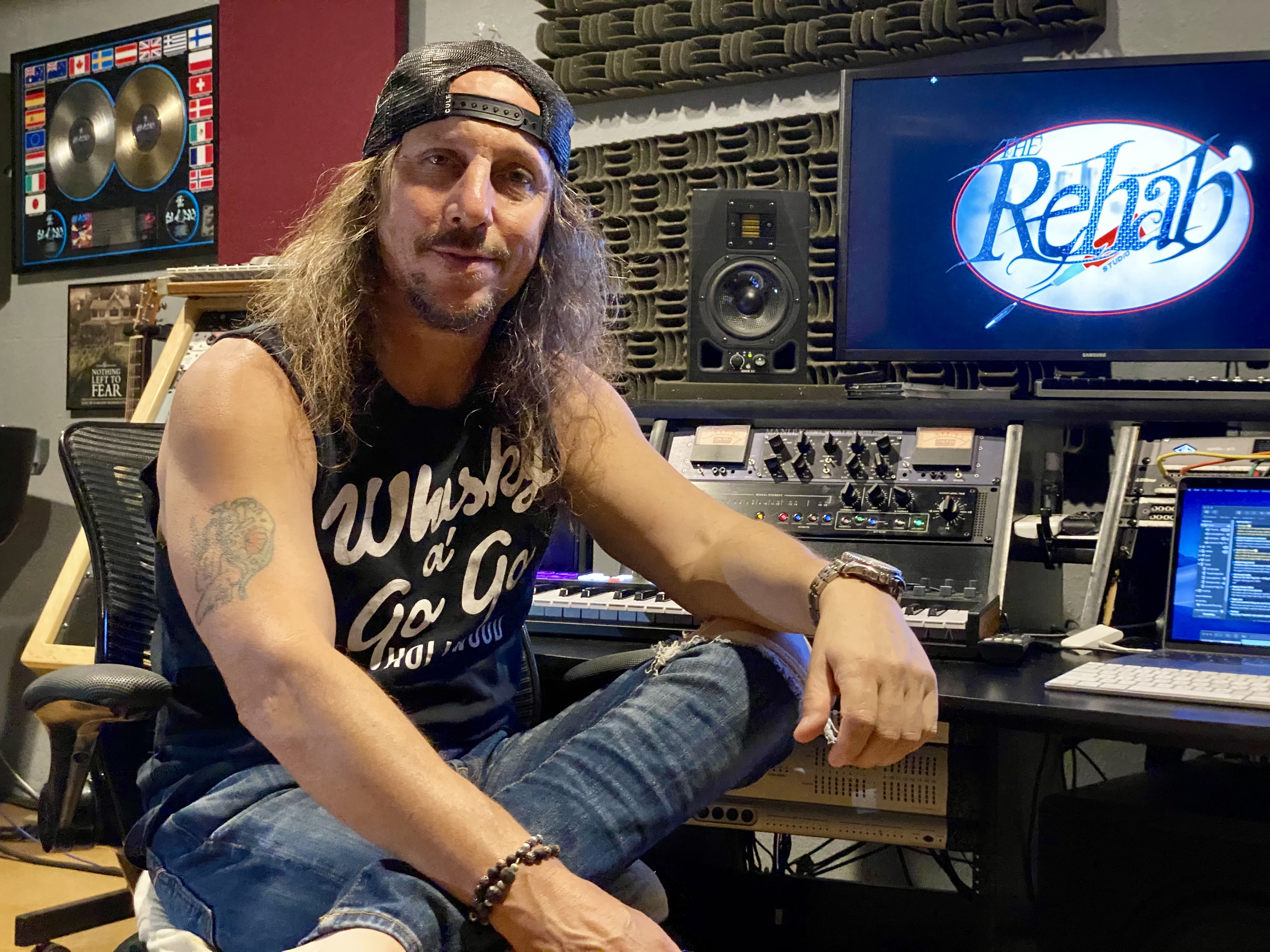
- Big Chris at The rehab Studio LA

Background information
- Born: Chris Trinidad Flores; August 31, 1970 (age 55); Newport Beach, California, United States
- Occupations: Songwriter, producer, audio engineer
- Years active: 1996-present
- Label: Moodswing Records
- Website: www.therehabstudio.com#/Home

Chris Trinidad Flores (born August 31, 1970), known professionally as Big Chris Flores, is an American-Mexican record producer and sound engineer. He first began his music production career in 1999, and in 2002, he founded Moodswing Records. Over the years, Big Chris has been producing music for people such as; Slash, Fergie, K-Ci & JoJo, Layzie Bone, KRS-One, C-Bo, Bun B, Trill OG, Lil Zane, Cedric the Entertainer, and Bone Thugs-n-Harmony.

== Early life and career ==
Chris Trinidad Flores was born on August 31, 1970. Upon completion of his recording education in 1995, Big Chris went on to become an assistant engineer at Brandon's Way Recording Studio; which is Kenneth "Baby Face" Edmunds private recording studio. Here, Big Chris assisted on a number of recording projects; among them, Babyface, En Vogue, Boyz II Men, Kenny Loggins, Rolling Stones, Az Yet, etc. In 1997, Big Chris went on to become chief sound engineer at King Pin Records, where he engineered for a number of rap groups, including Bone Thugs-n-Harmony, and many other artists that were signed to King Pin Records.

== The Rehab Studio ==
In 1999, Big Chris met Cedric the Entertainer, just prior to Cedric filming the hit movie The Original Kings of Comedy. Upon Cedric's request, Big Chris wrote a reggae/instrumental song named, Peanut Butter, No Jam, which Cedric sings to live in the movie. Soon after the release of The Original Kings of Comedy, Big Chris signed a twelve-song publishing deal with Cedric, which kick started his production career. In 2000-2001 Big Chris scored a documentary video on the life of Cedric the Entertainer, called Life is a Tour.

In 2002, Big Chris wrote and produced a song for Layzie Bone of Bone Thugs-n-Harmony for the movie Barbershop, starring Ice Cube and Cedric the Entertainer. The same year, Big Chris recorded and produced six songs with KRS-One for a mix tape "dissing" Nelly, after Nelly "dissed" KRS-One on BET's 106 & Park. Later that year, Big Chris founded his music studio and production company, "The Rehab Studio", where he produced rock, pop reggae, Latin and urban tracks for television and film. As of today he has placed over eighty songs in various television shows, including MTV's Laguna Beach, The Hills, The City, The X Effect, and P Diddy's Making the Band.

In 2003, Big Chris Flores produced the opening song to an album by the Mo Thugs Family named "IV: The Movement", featuring Layzie Bone. In 2005, Big Chris produced and mixed a Latin hip hop song, performed by Camilo "Tea Time" Castaldi named En La Calle, which was released on Machete Music's Hip Hop En Tu Idioma compilation album. That same year, Big Chris produced and mixed a reggae album, featuring top name reggae artists such as Prezident Brown, Luciano and Grammy Award winner Yami Bolo.

In 2006, Big Chris produced and mixed a reggaeton song called Passion which was released in the movie Jarhead's DVD collector's edition. In 2007, Big Chris produced and mixed two songs for a Cedric the Entertainer and Lucy Liu movie called, Code Name: The Cleaner. That same year, Big Fish Audio released an audio DVD containing forty two tracks produced and mixed by Big Chris named Hip Hop Moodswings, for their catalog of production loops and sounds for producers to use. Hip Hop Moodswings was number one in the Big Fish catalog for more than two months.

In 2008, Big Chris produced and mixed a score written by Velvet Revolver guitarist/ex-Guns N' Roses guitarist Slash, for a movie called This is Not a Movie, which was released in Mexico and Europe in January 2011, and is soon to be released in the United States. Immediately after the music production of This is Not a Movie, Big Chris and Slash started pre-production on Slash's first self-titled solo album, where Big Chris did production throughout the album, along with Eric Valentine, Kid Rock and Kevin Churko, which included production, keyboards and programming on one of the hit singles featuring Fergie called Beautiful Dangerous.

Big Chris continues to record, produce and mix at his production studio in L.A. called "The Rehab Studio". Recent projects include Miss Bang Bang's single and music video Punch Drunk Lover featuring Slash acting as engineer for Rihanna's single, Rock Star 101 featuring Slash, as well as Bun B's album, Trill OG. He is also co-writing and producing songs with Jeff Foskett, among others.

== Discography ==
Year	Project	Role
1999	Documentary: Cedric the Entertainer's "Life is a Tour"	Composed & produced thirteen songs
2000	MTV The Original Kings of Comedy	Peanut Butter No Jam
2001	Black Spring Break	"Lights, Camera, Action" Featuring Cedric The Entertainer
2002	Barbershop	"Smoke" Featuring Layzie Bone
2002	The Playaz Court Artisan	"What Ya'll Wanna Do?"
2002	Moodswing Records Volume I.	Composed, recorded, produced & mixed
2002	Drunken Tiger	Recorded, co-produced & mixed
2003	Mo' Thugz IV intro song The Movement featuring Layzie Bone	Produced
2005	MTV Laguna Beach: 2nd Season	Produced three songs
2005	Yami Bolo Almighty 1	Produced & mixed
2005	Machete Music Hip Hop En Tu Idioma En La Calle	Produced & mixed
2006	Jarhead DVD Collectors Edition song "Passion"	Produced & mixed
2006	MTV The X Effect song "Love Exists"	Produced & mixed
2006	MTV Laguna Beach Season 2 DVD song Viboras De La Calle	Produced & mixed
2006	Jah Sun's The Height of Light Album: Featuring Yami Bolo, Ras Attitude, Prezident Brown, Luciano and Cedric the Entertainer	Produced & mixed
2006	MTV "The Hills" song "Move Ya Body"	Produced & mixed
2006	USA Network "A Great American Christmas" songs "Viboras De La Calle", "Keep Runnin" & "Nuevo Dia"	Produced & mixed
2007	Film: "Code Name: The Cleaner" songs "Race" & "Keep Runnin"	Produced & mixed
2007	Big Fish Audio Production CD: "Hip Hop Moodswing"	Produced & mixed forty two audio tracks
2007	E Entertainment songs Paradise City, "Crenshaw", "8th" & "Pain"	Produced & mixed
2007	MTV The Hills song "Rain on Payday"	Produced & mixed
2007	MTV P Diddy's Making the Band	Composed, produced and mixed eight songs
2008	MTV "Buzzin"	Produced & mixed four songs
2009	Rihanna: Rated R song "Rock Star 101" featuring Slash	Additional engineer
2009	Hard Rock Group "This is Not a Band" featuring Slash	Co-wrote, produced & mixed five songs
2009	MTV "The City" & "Breathe"	Produced & mixed
2009	Animal Planet "The Jockey" & "Her Planet" by Paul Price	Produced, mixed, & engineered
2010	TLC's LA Ink	Produced two songs for 1st and 2nd episodes of season three
2010	20th Century Fox Percy Jackson TV & Viral Ads	Produced four songs
2010	Kung Fu Films movie "This is Not a Movie"	Producer of the music score with Slash
2010	Slash solo album Beautiful Dangerous featuring Fergie	Produced
2010	TLC's LA Ink	Placed over forty tracks throughout season four
2010	G4 network That's Tough opening sequence	Keyboards & producing
2010	Slash Deluxe Box Set	Additional production, keyboards & programming
2011	Les Paul Tribute Album	Engineer
2012	Steven Tyler vocal remixing for Save the Arts Foundation music video	Engineer
2013	BAE All-Star Album Featuring Gilby Clark, Matt Sorum, Chris Chaney, Kenny Aranoff, Rafael Moreira	Mix Engineer
2013	"Be Like Sheen" featuring Slash and Charlie Sheen, written by Darius Mcrary and Donovan Mcrary	Mixed and Mastered Slash
2013	Nothing Left to Fear title track "Nothing Left to Fear"	Co-producer and mix of the title track Slash
2015	Miss Bang Bang Single Punch Drunk Lover featuring Slash	Produced and mixed
2017	Terry Ilous Gypsy Dream	recorded & produced, additional guitars and vocals
2017	Chris Stills single "The Weekend"	recorded, produced and mixed, additional vocals
2023	Lynch Mob "Babylon"	recorded guitars, vocals, produced, mixed and mastered
2023	George Lynch "Guitars At The End Of The World"	recorded guitars, produced, mixed and mastered
2023	Slash & Chester Bennington "Crazy"	recorded guitars and Vocals produced & mixed
