= Sophia (Nerina Pallot song) =

Single by Nerina Pallot

from the album Fires
- Released: October 2, 2006
- Recorded: Red Bus (London)
- Genre: Pop
- Length: 3:44
- Label: Idaho; 14th Floor
- Songwriter(s): Nerina Pallot
- Producer(s): Nerina Pallot; Howard Wilding

Nerina Pallot singles chronology
"Everybody's Gone to War" (2006)	"Sophia" (2006)	"Learning to Breathe" (2007)

"Sophia" is the second single released from the re-release of Nerina Pallot's second album, Fires. It was released on October 2, 2006. It was nominated for an Ivor Novello Award in the category of Best Song Musically and Lyrically.

The single includes Pallot's cover of Kylie Minogue's "Confide in Me".

== Charts ==
Unofficially, it entered at number 86 on the UK Singles Chart before jumping to its peak of number 32 in its first official week on the chart. "Sophia" is Pallot's second most successful hit single, after "Everybody's Gone to War", giving her a second top 40 hit on the UK Singles Chart.

The single also peaked at number 12 on the UK Airplay Chart in October 2006.

== Music video ==
In the music video, Pallot is playing a piano and singing in the desert, while flames continue to grow around her. During the song, the piano catches fire, surrounding Pallot in a fire circle. The video is described as "beautiful" and a great contrast to the lighter video for "Everybody's Gone to War".

The video uses the single version, which is more upbeat, with strings and pop drumbeats. The album version is noticeably much slower with only the piano as accompaniment.

== Track listing ==
CD, digital download

1. "Sophia" (single version) – 3:41
2. "Confide in Me" – 3:40

7" vinyl, digital download

1. "Sophia" (single version) – 3:41
2. "(Cash & Sin) Mr King" – 5:00

Digital download

1. "Sophia" (Unplugged) – 3:59

== Charts ==
Chart (2006)	Peak position
UK Singles (OCC)	32
