= Beautiful Dangerous =

Single by Slash featuring Fergie

from the album Slash
- Released: October 28, 2010
- Recorded: March 4–August 17, 2009
- Genre: Hard rock; blues rock
- Length: 4:41
- Label: EMI; Roadrunner
- Songwriters: Slash; Fergie
- Producers: Eric Valentine; Big Chris Flores

Slash singles chronology
"Back from Cali" (2010)	"Beautiful Dangerous" (2010)	"Ghost" (2010)

Fergie singles chronology
"Gettin' Over You" (2010)	"Beautiful Dangerous" (2011)	"A Little Party Never Killed Nobody (All We Got)" (2013)

Music video
- "Slash - "Beautiful Dangerous" (feat. Fergie)" on YouTube

"Beautiful Dangerous" is the third track and third single on the debut self-titled solo album by current Guns N' Roses and former Velvet Revolver guitarist, Slash. It features Fergie of The Black Eyed Peas on vocals. Though not initially released as an official single, the song managed to peak at number 11 on the Heatseekers Songs chart and number 58 on the Canadian Hot 100.

== Composition ==
During an interview, where Slash goes through each of his album tracks, he stated:

I got hip to Fergie being probably as good or better a rock singer than she is a pop singer. I heard her do "Barracuda", the old Heart song, and I was like, fuckin’ wow! I ended up doing a couple of shows with her where she sang "Barracuda" and "Sweet Child o' Mine". She’s one of the most phenomenal fucking rock ‘n’ roll singers, male or female, I’ve ever heard.'

Slash told The Sun: "The track began as a piece of music I'd written as a score for a strip bar scene and it made me think of [Fergie]. I'm a guy and there's nothing sexier than seeing a cute girl sing rock 'n' roll."

== Music video ==
On August 27, 2010, it was announced that Slash was filming a music video for the song. Slash stated that "[the] concept is twisted; Fergie's idea." The video for "Beautiful Dangerous" premiered on Vevo on October 26, 2010. The video depicts Fergie as a deranged woman who is obsessed with Slash. The room she is staying in is strewn with posters, tickets and other memorabilia of Slash. A tube television plays Slash concerts on repeat, and Fergie is seen engaged in some kind of strange fetishist worship of the television. Later on she is seen dressing provocatively and going to a concert where Slash is playing and presumably follows him to a strip club afterwards. Fergie makes visual advances to Slash to which he responds and they both start flirting. After secretly drugging his drink, they leave the bar and head to a hotel. Slash, having been drugged, is held captive by Fergie and tied to a bed. Fergie mounts, kisses, and intimidates him with a knife. In the end, she stabs Slash, killing him.

== Charts ==
Chart (2010)	Peak position
Canada Hot 100 (Billboard)	58
Czech Republic Airplay (ČNS IFPI)	64
Germany (GfK)	90
Ukraine Airplay (TopHit)	95
U.S. Billboard Heatseekers Songs	11

== Personnel ==
- Slash - lead & rhythm guitars
- Fergie - lead vocals
- Chris Chaney - bass
- Josh Freese - drums
- Lenny Castro - percussion
- Big Chris Flores - keyboards, programming
