= Sahara (Slash song) =

Single by Slash featuring Koshi Inaba

from the album Slash (Japanese Edition)
- B-side: "Paradise City" (featuring Cypress Hill and Fergie)
- Released: November 11, 2009
- Recorded: March 4–August 17, 2009
- Genre: Hard rock
- Length: 4:00
- Label: Universal Music
- Songwriter(s): Slash and Koshi Inaba
- Producer(s): Eric Valentine

Slash singles chronology
"What I Want" (2007)	"Sahara" (2009)	"By the Sword" (2010)

"Sahara" is the first single from Slash's self titled album, featuring Koshi Inaba on the vocals. It was released as the first single of the album in Japan only. It has been awarded "Single of the Year" by the RIAJ.

== Information ==
"Sahara" features Koshi Inaba (from B'z) on vocals, and he contributed to the Japanese and English lyrics. It was released on November 11, 2009 in Japan as Slash's first solo single. It charted at number four on the Oricon Singles Chart, as well number six on the Billboard Japan Hot 100 and number four on the Top Singles Sales chart. It was the 112th best-selling single of the year with 53,758 copies sold on the Oricon yearly chart. It has been awarded Western "Single of the Year" award at the 24th Japan Gold Disc Award by RIAJ.

The B-side to the single is a cover version of Guns N' Roses' "Paradise City" with Cypress Hill and Fergie of The Black Eyed Peas on vocals.

"Sahara" is only available as a bonus track on the Japanese version of the album Slash. The song has been re-recorded with lyrics in English. The English version is available on the iTunes version of the album, as a bonus track. It's also available as a bonus track on the Canadian Deluxe edition of the album (with English vocals).

== Personnel ==
- Slash - lead & rhythm guitars, backing vocals on "Paradise City"
- Koshi Inaba - lead vocals on "Sahara"
- Fergie - lead vocals on "Paradise City"
- Cypress Hill - co-lead vocals on "Paradise City"
- Franky Perez - backing vocals on "Paradise City"
- Chris Chaney - bass
- Josh Freese - drums
- Lenny Castro - percussion

== See also ==
- Slash
- Slash (solo album)
- Koshi Inaba
- B'z
- "By the Sword" (single)
