= The Sound and the Fury (album) =

Studio album by Nerina Pallot
- Released: 11 September 2015
- Recorded: 2015
- Genre: Pop; pop rock
- Length: 47:46
- Label: Idaho; INgrooves
- Producer: Nerina Pallot; Andy Chatterley

Nerina Pallot chronology
Year of the Wolf (2011)	The Sound and the Fury (2015)	Stay Lucky (2017)

Singles from The Sound and the Fury
- 1. "The Road" Released: 17 July 2015; 2. "Rousseau" Released: 11 September 2015

The Sound and the Fury is the fifth album by British singer-songwriter Nerina Pallot. It was released on 11 September 2015, four years since her last studio album Year of the Wolf. The first release from the album was the teaser track "The Road". The first official single, a re-recording of "Rosseau" from Pallot's 12 EP set The Year of the EPs, was released alongside The Sound and the Fury on 11 September 2015.

== Background and recording ==
In 2014, Pallot spent 12 months recording 12 EPs of five songs in a project she titled The Year of the EPs. Following fan feedback and critical response, the best tracks were selected, alongside the recording of three new songs to be reworked to form a new studio album.

== Reception ==
Professional ratings
Review scores
Source	Rating
Uncut	7/10

Uncut gave The Sound and the Fury 7/10, stating the songs on the album "leave a lasting impression".

== Track listing ==
The Sound and the Fury track listing
No.	Title	Length
1.	"There Is a Drum"	4:23
2.	"Ain't Got Anything Left"	4:20
3.	"Rousseau"	3:58
4.	"If I Had a Girl"	3:52
5.	"Boy on the Bus"	3:46
6.	"Handle"	4:25
7.	"Spirit Walks"	2:38
8.	"Big White House"	4:44
9.	"The Road"	5:20
10.	"Blessèd"	5:00
11.	"The Longest Memory"	5:10

== Charts ==
Chart performance for The Sound and the Fury
Chart (2015)	Peak position
UK Albums (OCC)	41
