= Dear Frustrated Superstar =

Studio album by Nerina Pallot
- Released: 20 August 2001
- Recorded: Sage and Sound; Xstacy South; Sunset Sound Los Angeles; Eastcote; RAK; The Glue Hotel; Nerina's House, London
- Genre: Pop rock; R&B; soul; trip hop
- Length: 66:55
- Label: Polydor
- Producer: Nerina Pallot; Jeremy Stacey

Nerina Pallot chronology
Dear Frustrated Superstar (2001)	Fires (2005)

Professional ratings
Review scores
Source	Rating
BBC Online	(positive)
Drowned in Sound	7/10 stars
Entertainment.ie	2/5 stars
NME	7/10 stars
The Independent	(positive)

Dear Frustrated Superstar is the debut album by the British singer Nerina Pallot. Following its release in August 2001, the album peaked at UK #82. However, the single never officially entered the chart as the official UK Albums Chart lists only the Top 75 sellers.

Following its lack of commercial success, Pallot publicly criticised the record, which, following the success of follow-up Fires in 2006, was re-shipped to stores by Polydor at a discount price. According to UK music sales publication Music Week, the album had sold a total of 10,073 copies in the UK as of 28 May 2006.

Pallot has since begun playing material from Dear Frustrated Superstar frequently in concert.

== Track listing ==
Track	Title	Length
1.	"If I Know You"	6:13
2.	"Patience"	4:29
3.	"Someday Soon"	4:46
4.	"Watch Out Billie"	4:39
5.	"Daily Bread"	4:48
6.	"Rainbow"	4:44
7.	"Alien"	4:54
8.	"Jump"	4:14
9.	"Very Good Sir"	4:18
10.	"Dear Frustrated Superstar"	4:16
11.	"Blood Is Blood"	4:03
12.	"God"	5:37
13.	"My Last Tango"	5:24
14.	"Daphne and Apollo"	2:43

== Singles ==
Two singles were released from the album, "Patience" and "Alien". "If I Know You" was planned as the third single from the album and a video was shot, however the single and video never surfaced. Following this, Nerina and Polydor parted company.

=== Chart statistics ===
Release date	Title	Peak position
Release date	Title	UK Singles Chart
06/08/2001	"Patience"	61
12/11/2001	"Alien"	98
