= Fires (Nerina Pallot album) =

Studio album by Nerina Pallot
- Released: 4 April 2005
- Recorded: Sage and Sound; Xstacy South; Sunset Sound (Los Angeles); Eastcote; RAK; The Glue Hotel; Nerina's House (London)
- Genre: Pop rock; alternative rock
- Length: 46:55
- Label: Idaho; 14th Floor
- Producer: Nerina Pallot; Howard Willing; Wendy Melvoin; Eric Rosse

Nerina Pallot chronology
Dear Frustrated Superstar (2001)	Fires (2005)	The Graduate (2009)

Alternative cover
- 2005 original release

Professional ratings
Review scores
Source	Rating
AllMusic	3.5/5 stars
Contactmusic.com	(positive)
Entertainment.ie	3/5 stars
IndieLondon	(positive)
LeedsMusicScene	3.5/5 stars
Sound Generator	9/10 stars
The Guardian	4/5 stars
The Oxford Student	(positive)
The Times	(positive)
Virgin Media	4/5 stars

Fires is the second album by London-born singer-songwriter Nerina Pallot. First released in 4 April 2005 on her own independent record label, Idaho Records, Fires was met with much critical acclaim but did not gain commercial recognition initially.

After working as a support act for artists such as Sheryl Crow and Suzanne Vega, Pallot was signed up to 14th Floor Records, who were impressed with the audience response and after-show sales of her album. Thus, Fires was reissued on 26 April 2006 with revamped artwork and some slight remixes on some of Pallot's songs. The album entered at UK #41 and later, on the strength of the popular single "Everybody's Gone to War", made it as far as #21.

To date, the album has been certified gold in the UK for sales of over 100,000, and has earned Pallot a nomination at the 2007 BRIT Awards for Best British Female. As of 4 October 2009, the album has sold 138,563 copies in the UK.

On 12 April 2024, the album has been remastered and reissued on vinyl for the first time.

== Track listing ==
All songs written by Nerina Pallot.

1. "Everybody's Gone to War" – 3:54
2. "Halfway Home" – 4:26
3. "Damascus" – 4:42
4. "Idaho" – 4:29
5. "All Good People" – 4:16
6. "Mr King" – 4:22
7. "Geek Love" – 4:00
8. "Sophia" – 3:40
9. "Learning to Breathe" – 4:09
10. "Heart Attack" – 3:25
11. "Nickindia" – 5:28

== Singles ==
The original release of the album was preceded by a download-only single, "Everybody's Gone to War". Two further singles, "Damascus" (June 2005) and "All Good People" (September 2005), the latter a BBC Radio 2 Single of the Week, failed to dent the UK Singles Chart. "All Good People" did, however, peak at #21 on the UK Airplay Chart in August 2005 and spent four weeks inside the Airplay Top 30.

After Pallot's success on the support slot circuit in 2005 led to her signing with 14th Floor Records, "Everybody's Gone to War" was re-released on download, CD, and 7" vinyl on 22 May 2006. With a memorable video directed by Marc Klasfeld and high-profile UK TV appearances, the song peaked at UK #14 and also peaked at #3 on the UK Airplay Chart.

A remixed version of "Sophia" followed on download, CD, and 7" vinyl after much delay on 2 October 2006, peaking at UK #32 (and #12 on the UK Airplay Chart). A fifth and final single from Fires, "Learning to Breathe", peaked at UK #70 following its release on 8 January 2007, but fared significantly better on the UK Airplay Chart, peaking at #22.

=== Chart statistics ===
Title	Release date	Peak chart positions			
Title	Release date	AUS	NLD	UK	UK Airplay
"Damascus"	6 June 2005	—	—	—	—
"All Good People"	5 September 2005	—	—	—	21
"Everybody's Gone to War"	22 May 2006	41	48	14	3
"Sophia"	2 October 2006	—	—	32	12
"Learning to Breathe"	8 January 2007	—	—	70	22
