= Everybody's Gone to War =

2006 single by Nerina Pallot

Single by Nerina Pallot

from the album Fires
- B-side: "Mr. King"
- Released: 22 May 2006
- Studio: Sage and Sound (Los Angeles); Eastcote, Nerina's House (London, England)
- Length: 3:54
- Label: 14th Floor
- Songwriter: Nerina Pallot
- Producer: Howard Willing

Nerina Pallot singles chronology
"All Good People" (2005)	"Everybody's Gone to War" (2006)	"Sophia" (2006)

"Everybody's Gone to War" is a song written and performed by British singer-songwriter Nerina Pallot. The song, an anti-war protest, was written during the early stages of the Iraq War in 2003 and was composed on bass guitar by Pallot. Originally distributed as a promotional CD in 2004, the song was commercially issued as the third single from Pallot's second album, Fires, on 22 May 2006, reaching number 14 on the UK Singles Chart the same month.

The accompanying music video features Pallot and other shoppers engaging in a 'food fight' in a busy supermarket. Directed by Marc Klasfeld, it received heavy rotation on British music channels with many people praising the humorous setting despite depicting a darker message within.

== Chart performance ==
After the album proved a commercial flop, Nerina Pallot toured as a support act for an array of other artists, and in 2006, she was signed to 14th Floor Records, impressed by reaction to her live sets. They reissued the album to greater success in the spring, and released "Everybody's Gone to War" as a commercial single on 22 May 2006, on the back of performances on Top of the Pops and GMTV. The single charted at number 37 on download sales alone and jumped to number 14 the following week, making it Pallot's highest chart peak in the UK.

== Track listing ==
UK CD and 7-inch single

1. "Everybody's Gone to War" – 3:54
2. "Mr. King" – 4:22

Australian CD single

1. "Everybody's Gone to War" – 3:54
2. "Mr. King" – 4:22
3. "Everybody's Gone to War" (strings version) – 3:53

== Credits and personnel ==
Credits are lifted from the UK 7-inch single sleeve.

Studios

- Recorded at Sage and Sound (Los Angeles), Eastcote Studios, and Nerina's House (London, England)
- Mixed at Resonate Studios (Los Angeles)
- Mastered at Sterling Sound (New York City)

Personnel

- Nerina Pallot – writing, vocals, backing vocals, electric guitar, piano, additional recording, artwork illustrations
- Susannah Melvoin – backing vocals
- Lyle Workman – guitar
- Tim Van der Kuil – guitar, bass guitar
- Roger Manning Jr. – Hammond B3
- Kevin Churko – keyboards
- Damon Wilson – drums
- Lenny Castro – percussion
- Howard Willing – production, recording, programming
- Chris Lord-Alge – mixing
- Keith Armstrong – mixing assistant
- Dmitar "Dim E" Krnjaic – mixing assistant
- Ted Jensen – mastering
- www.wearetourist.com – artwork design
- Melanie Nissen – photography

== Charts ==
=== Weekly charts ===
Chart (2006)	Peak position
Australia (ARIA)	41
Belgium (Ultratip Bubbling Under Flanders)	10
Belgium (Ultratip Bubbling Under Wallonia)	17
Scottish Singles Sales (Official Charts)	11
Switzerland (Schweizer Hitparade)	98
UK Singles (Official Charts)	14

=== Year-end charts ===
Chart (2006)	Position
UK Singles (OCC)	152

== Release history ==
Region	Date	Format(s)	Label(s)	Ref.
United Kingdom	2004	Promotional CD	Idaho	
United Kingdom	22 May 2006	CD	14th Floor	
Australia	28 August 2006	CD	14th Floor	

== See also ==
- List of anti-war songs
