= Nerina Pallot =

English singer-songwriter (born 1974)

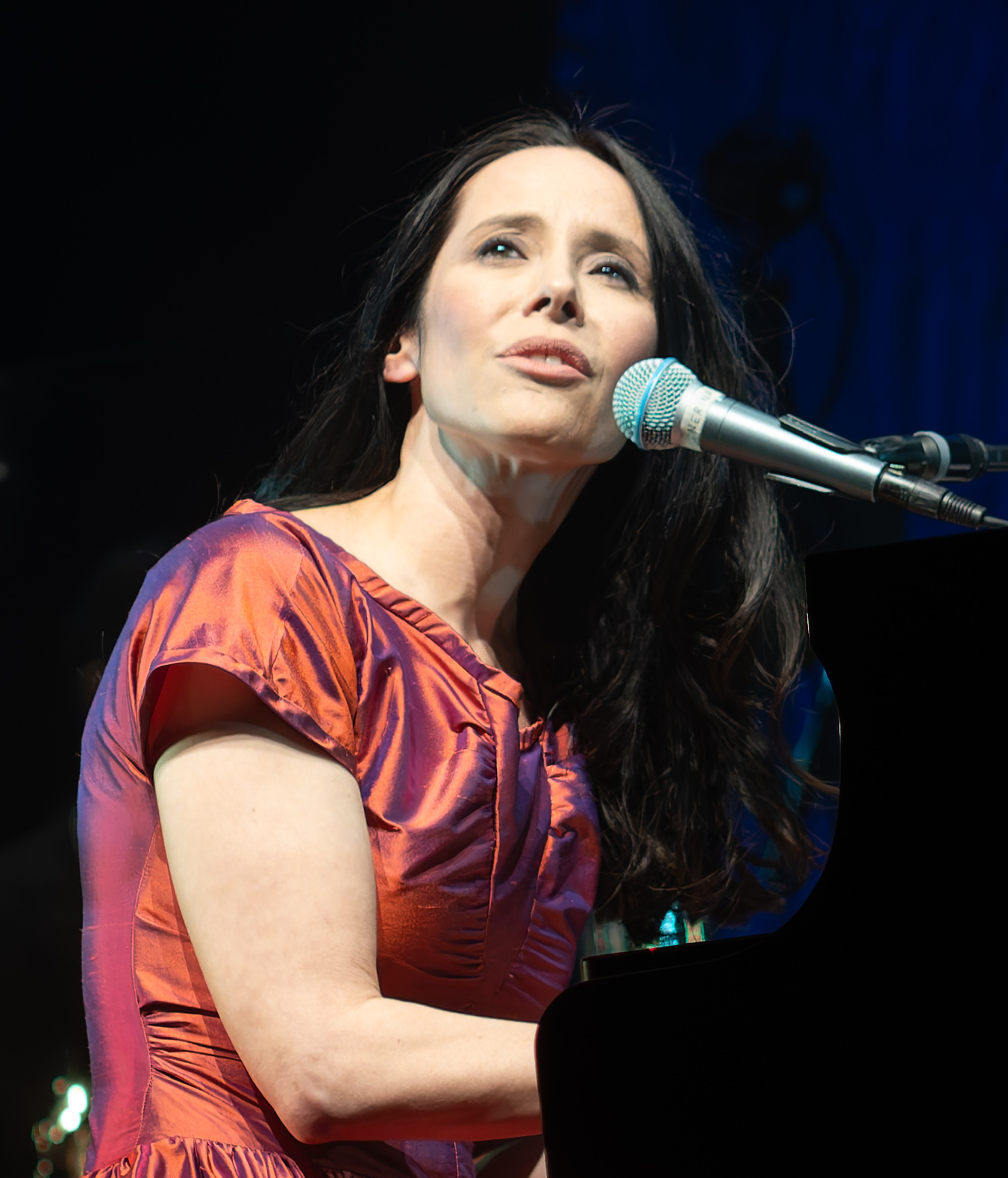
- Pallot performing at the London Palladium in 2024

Background information
- Born: Nerina Natasha Georgina Pallot; 26 April 1974 (age 52); London, England
- Origin: Jersey, Channel Islands
- Genres: Pop rock; alternative rock; indie pop
- Occupations: Singer; songwriter
- Instruments: Vocals; piano; guitar
- Years active: 2001–present
- Labels: Polydor; Idaho; 14th Floor; Echo; Geffen

Nerina Natasha Georgina Pallot (born 26 April 1974) is a British singer-songwriter. She has released eight albums and over a dozen EPs. She was nominated for British Female Solo Artist at the 2007 BRIT Awards and nominated for an Ivor Novello Award for "Sophia" in the category of 'Best Song (musically and lyrically)' in the same year. Besides her own material, Pallot has written songs for Kylie Minogue and Diana Vickers. She mostly tours around the UK and is married to producer Andy Chatterley.

== Early life ==
Pallot was born in London and brought up in Jersey by a half-French father and a mother from Prayag, India, together with her sister. As a child she taught herself piano and guitar, and then studied violin and opera at boarding school. She wrote her first song aged 13. She has identified seeing Kate Bush perform "This Woman's Work" on the television series Wogan as a catalyst for her to pursue a music career. She attended Jersey College for Girls and received a music scholarship for Wellington College.

== Career ==
=== 2001–2003: Dear Frustrated Superstar ===
Pallot released her debut album, Dear Frustrated Superstar, on Polydor records in August 2001. This spawned two singles, "Patience" and "Alien". She was subsequently dropped from the label mainly due to failing sales. The album was eventually re-issued several years later after her second album, Fires, had become a commercial success. Her then-manager Richard Ogden noted that his company spent "three years managing her while she had a huge record deal and was a massive priority for Polydor. We did the best job we possibly could, but it just didn't happen".

In 2003 she sang lead vocals on the track "Truly" on Delerium's album Chimera, which was also released as a single in the UK.

=== 2004–2008: Fires ===
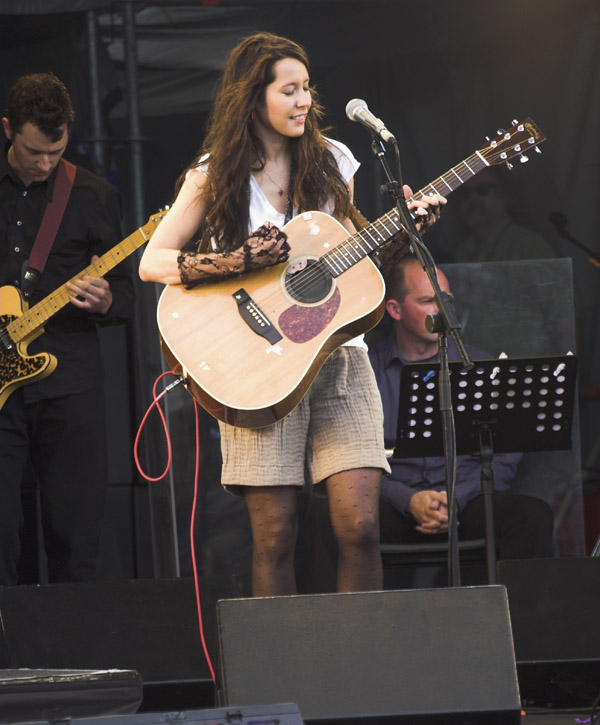
Pallot performing in 2006

Pallot's second album, Fires, was released in April 2005 on her own independent label, Idaho. It was published by Chrysalis Music Publishing, to whom she remained signed and provided her with a development deal. They initially provided her with £50,000 to make the album. When that proved insufficient for Pallot's needs, she remortgaged her house to complete the rest of the album.

The album was produced and mixed by Howard Willing together with producers Eric Rosse who produced "Learning to Breathe" and "Heart Attack" (co-produced by Willing) and Wendy Melvoin who produced "Damascus". After the initial tracks were finished the rest of the record was apparently completed by Willing and Pallot flying back and forth from London to Los Angeles.

The album was preceded by a download-only single, "Everybody's Gone to War". A second single from the record, "Damascus" was released in June 2005, and a third, "All Good People" (a Radio 2 single of the week) was released in September 2005. She performed at the 2005 Guildfest music festival and headlined her own show at Bush Hall in Shepherd's Bush, London later that year.

At the end of 2005, Pallot signed with 14th Floor Records (a Warner label), who re-issued the album after adding strings on some tracks, on 24 April 2006, earning Pallot a chart success by reaching Number 21. With over 100,000 sales it was certified gold in the UK.

The first single from the revamped album was "Everybody's Gone to War", which was playlisted on most major British radio stations. The single became the third most played song on British radio the week before its release, and reached Number 14 in the UK singles chart. She undertook her first full headlining tour in support of the Fires album in May 2006. During the year she also played headline shows in London at ICA, the Bloomsbury Theatre, Regent's Park Open Air Theatre and at Shepherd's Bush Empire.

The second single from the album was "Sophia". A re-recorded version, created in LA along with producer Mitchell Froom, entered the UK singles chart at Number 32. In April 2007, the song was nominated for an Ivor Novello Award, while she toured around the UK and Ireland in January and February of that year. The next single from the re-released version of Fires was "Learning to Breathe", which reached Number 70 in the UK singles chart.

=== 2009–2010: The Graduate ===
Pallot worked with several big name co-writers in preparation for the follow-up to Fires, including Linda Perry (Christina Aguilera's "Beautiful") and Rob Davis (Kylie Minogue's "Can't Get You Out of My Head"). She also wrote an album's worth of material with Rick Nowels (Madonna's "Power of Goodbye", Belinda Carlisle's "Heaven Is A Place on Earth"). She struggled with the co-writing process and in the end only self-written songs made the album.

The Graduate was released on 5 October 2009 in the UK and reached number 46 on the Official UK Albums Chart in its first week of release. The standard version of the album features 10 original tracks, whereas the iTunes version contains three additional tracks, and the deluxe version contains seven acoustic versions of the tracks. The album polarised critics, with some lauding it as her best album yet and others seeing her change of direction from Fires as a mistake. Having had no intention of releasing Fires 2, Pallot has defended the need for a progression between the two records. She toured the UK in October 2009, including a performance at Glasgow's Oran Mor venue on Wednesday 7 October, showcasing songs from the new album The Graduate.

=== 2011–2013: Year of the Wolf ===
In July 2010, Pallot returned to Geffen Records and to the A&R that first signed her to Polydor while embarking on an eight-day tour around the UK and Ireland. She confirmed her new album would be titled Year of the Wolf via her Twitter page on 21 January 2011. She recorded with Bernard Butler for the album. The lead single was "Put Your Hands Up", released 24 April, while the album was released 13 June 2011.

=== 2014: Year of the EPs ===
For her next project, Pallot decided to release an EP every month in 2014, as she "just got sick of the album, tour, single... that whole cycle". The first was called The Hold Tight in January, followed by We Should Break Up in February. She found that "I'm at a point in my career where I can pretty much make it up now. I've also realised that a true fan base [...] cares about hearing as much music as they can get their hands on". Pallot supported the releases with a handful of tour dates across the UK. In September 2015 she released her fifth album The Sound and the Fury.

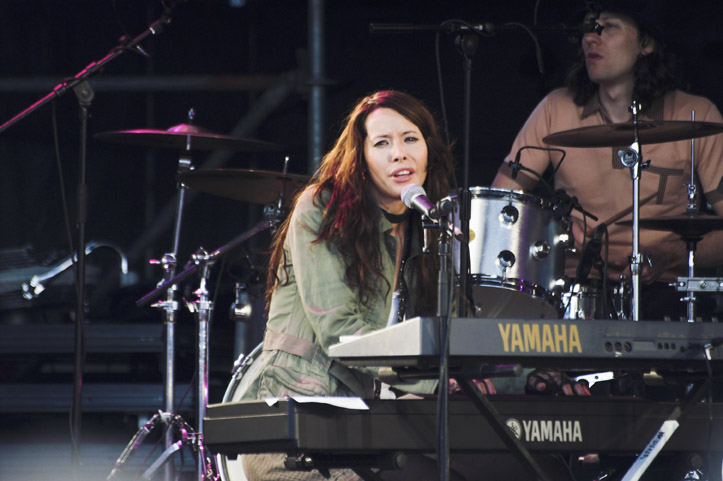
Pallot at Cornbury Music Festival 2006

=== 2015–2016: The Sound and the Fury ===
In 2015, Pallot independently released her fifth studio album The Sound and the Fury via her own Idaho label.

=== 2017: Stay Lucky ===
2017 saw the release of Pallot's sixth studio album, Stay Lucky. The album includes the track "The Heart is a Lonely Hunter", which takes its title from Carson McCullers' debut novel of 1940 - and which Pallot herself has described as 'the best song I have ever written'.

=== 2022: I Don't Know What I'm Doing ===
2022 saw the release of Pallot's seventh studio album, I Don't Know What I'm Doing

=== 2024: A Psalm for Emily Salvi ===
In 2024, Pallot released her eighth studio album, A Psalm for Emily Salvi. "Regrets" was the first single from the album. On 13 April she played the London Palladium.

=== 2025: All Roads Lead to... solo tour ===
Between September to December, Pallot is touring the UK and Ireland (36 nights). She is due to play the Royal Albert Hall in May 2026.

=== Videos ===
Pallot has released six videos to go with singles from Dear Frustrated Superstar, Fires, and Year of the Wolf.

Pallot's first video for "Patience", directed by Swedish director Emma Hvengaard, features Pallot in various scenes, notably wearing white and barefoot, continually floating to and from earth. "Alien" begins with Pallot lying down, it then becomes apparent that she had fallen onto a plumber's van, crushing it, and the video implies she has fallen from the sky "like an alien". The unreleased "If I Know You" video features multiple Nerinas fighting each other in a theatre.

For "Damascus", Pallot is seen playing piano and singing in a recording studio. Pallot's next video was for "Everybody's Gone to War", which includes cabbage-throwing goths and pineapple bombs. Her next video was for "Sophia", and was filmed in the middle of the desert in Morocco. It has Pallot sitting at a piano, playing and singing while fire surrounds her in a circle and her piano smokes and is also alight. Pallot's next performance, "Learning to Breathe", is more "abstract" and is computer-generated with her playing the guitar in a house with many pictures decorating the walls.

The video for "Put Your Hands Up", the lead single from Year of the Wolf, was shot in and around Lant Street in Southwark, London.

=== Songwriting and production ===
- Pallot along with her husband Andy Chatterley wrote and produced two songs for Aphrodite, the 2010 album by Kylie Minogue, the title track "Aphrodite" and third single "Better than Today", which first appeared on Pallot's Buckminster Fuller EP from 2009.
- Pallot wrote and co-produced "Put It Back Together" for Diana Vickers from her debut album Songs from the Tainted Cherry Tree, Vickers performed 'Put It Back Together' as a special guest at Pallot's live concert at Union Chapel in Islington, north London, on 28 April 2010.
- Pallot's "Real Late Starter" was covered by 2009 X Factor UK winner Joe McElderry for his debut album, Wide Awake, released on 25 October 2010.
- In 2010, she co-wrote a song with Brazilian singer Sandy, called "Dias Iguais" – from Sandy's solo studio album Manuscrito.

== Personal life ==
Pallot married fellow Jersey resident and record producer Andy Chatterley in January 2007. In 2010, she gave birth to a son.

In 2009, Pallot received a degree in English from Birkbeck, University of London.

In 2010, Pallot said she was a member of the Labour Party, but expressed disillusionment with the leadership of Gordon Brown and accused former Prime Minister Tony Blair of war crimes.

== Discography ==
- Dear Frustrated Superstar (2001)
- Fires (2005)
- The Graduate (2009)
- Year of the Wolf (2011)
- The Sound and the Fury (2015)
- Stay Lucky (2017)
- I Don't Know What I'm Doing (2022)
- A Psalm For Emily Salvi (2024)
