= A Cinderella Story (disambiguation) =

A Cinderella Story is a 2004 American film.

A Cinderella Story or Cinderella Story may also refer to:

- A Cinderella Story (film series), an American film series
  - Another Cinderella Story, 2008
  - A Cinderella Story: Once Upon a Song, 2011
  - A Cinderella Story: If the Shoe Fits, 2016
  - A Cinderella Story: Christmas Wish, 2019
  - A Cinderella Story: Starstruck, 2021
- Ever After: A Cinderella Story, a 1998 American film
- "Cinderella Story" (Dawson's Creek), a 2000 television episode
- "A Cinderella Story", a 2008 song by Mudvayne from their album The New Game
- Cinderella story, a situation in which competitors achieve far greater success than would reasonably have been best expected

== See also ==
- Cinderella (disambiguation)
