= A Cinderella Story =

2004 film by Mark Rosman

- Theatrical release poster
- Directed by: Mark Rosman
- Written by: Leigh Dunlap
- Based on: Cinderella by Charles Perrault
- Produced by: Clifford Werber; Ilyssa Goodman; Hunt Lowry; Dylan Sellers
- Starring: Hilary Duff; Jennifer Coolidge; Chad Michael Murray; Regina King
- Narrated by: Hilary Duff
- Cinematography: Anthony B. Richmond
- Edited by: Cara Silverman
- Music by: Christophe Beck
- Production companies: Dylan Sellers Productions; Clifford Werber Productions
- Distributed by: Warner Bros. Pictures
- Release date: July 16, 2004
- Running time: 95 minutes
- Country: United States
- Language: English
- Budget: $19 million
- Box office: $70.1 million

A Cinderella Story is a 2004 American teen romantic comedy film directed by Mark Rosman, written by Leigh Dunlap and starring Hilary Duff, Chad Michael Murray, Jennifer Coolidge, and Regina King. A 21st century adaptation of the story Cinderella folklore, the plot revolves around two internet pen pals who plan to meet in person at their high school's Halloween dance.

The film was released by Warner Bros. Pictures on July 16, 2004, and was initially panned by critics. It grossed $70.1 million against its $19 million budget. The film inspired multiple straight-to-video films. Over the years, A Cinderella Story has developed into a cult classic.

== Plot ==
Samantha "Sam" Montgomery is raised by her widowed father Hal, who runs a diner in the San Fernando Valley. He marries the vain and greedy Fiona, who has two daughters, Brianna and Gabriella. When Sam is nine, Hal dies in the 1994 Northridge earthquake, supposedly without a will, so Fiona inherits everything.

Eight years later, 17-year-old Sam still lives with her stepfamily and there is a drought. She and her best friend, aspiring actor Carter Farrell, are tormented by the popular clique at school, led by head cheerleader Shelby Cummings.

Forced to work at the diner to save money to attend Princeton University, Sam is looked after by longtime manager Rhonda. Sam confides in her online pen pal "Nomad", another student at her school who also aspires to attend Princeton to become a writer. Unbeknownst to her, "Nomad" is Austin Ames, the popular but unhappy school quarterback and Shelby's trophy boyfriend, whose father Andy expects to attend USC.

Sam agrees to meet "Nomad" at the school Halloween dance. Austin has broken up with Shelby, although she is in denial. Fiona refuses to give Sam the night off to attend the dance, but Rhonda and Carter intervene. Rhonda gives her a mask and a saved wedding dress to wear as "Cinderella". Dressed as "Prince Charming", Austin reveals to Sam that he is "Nomad" but does not recognize her under her mask, and they share a romantic dance.

A masked Carter makes out with Shelby after defending her from the unwanted advances of Austin's friend, but has to hurry Sam back to the diner before midnight. As they leave, Sam drops her cell phone, which Austin finds. The diner workers stall Fiona and her daughters, allowing Sam to sneak in.

The next day, Austin covers the school in flyers, seeking the mysterious Cinderella's identity, and Shelby cruelly rejects Carter. Austin's friends line up a crowd of girls claiming to be Cinderella, without success. Austin is accepted to Princeton but cannot tell his father, and visits the diner, where Sam almost reveals herself.

Brianna and Gabriella discover Sam's emails with Austin, realizing she is 'Cinderella'. Once each fails to convince Austin that they are Cinderella, they present the emails to Shelby, claiming Sam schemed to steal Austin from her. At the school pep rally, Shelby and the twins perform a humiliating skit exposing Sam as Cinderella. When Austin fails to defend her, she leaves upset.

Fiona intercepts Sam's Princeton acceptance letter and replaces it with a forged rejection letter. Although Sam is disheartened, Rhonda encourages her not to lose hope. When the twins slam the diner door behind them, the impact knocks the clock off the wall, exposing a wallpapered-over mural of Hal's motto, "Never let the fear of striking out keep you from playing the game." Inspired by her father's words, Sam stands up to Fiona, quits her job, and moves out. Rhonda, the other employees, and the customers all leave with her.

Sam moves in with Rhonda and, just before the homecoming game, confronts Austin for his cowardice. Seeing her leaving before the game's last play, Austin, realizing that he loves Sam, turns control of the team over to his friend and teammate Ryan, rejects Shelby, and stands up to his father before running after Sam, with Andy and Shelby calling after him. He apologizes and, as the drought finally ends as it starts to rain, they share their first kiss and begin a relationship, much to the twins' and Shelby's dismay.

Later, while packing the last of her things, Sam finds her father's will inside her childhood fairytale book, revealing she inherited everything, including the house and the diner. As the rightful owner, Sam sells her stepfamily's cars to pay for college. Fiona claims to have never seen the will before, despite having signed it as a witness, and is arrested for inheritance fraud.

In lieu of prison, Fiona arranges with the D.A. to work off her debt to Sam for the diner and for having abused her as a domestic servant and underage employee. Sam now co-owns the diner with Rhonda, while Fiona's daughters, after retrieving Sam's acceptance letter from the trash, also must work with her.

Andy accepts Austin's decision to attend Princeton. Carter lands a commercial and rejects Shelby's advances, opting to date Astrid, the school's goth DJ and announcer. Austin returns Sam's cell phone, having begun their relationship, driving to Princeton together.

== Cast ==
- Hilary Duff as Samantha "Sam" Montgomery
  - Hannah Robinson as Young Sam
- Jennifer Coolidge as Fiona/ Mrs. Montgomery, Sam's stepmother
- Chad Michael Murray as Austin Ames, Sam's love interest- Boyfriend
- Dan Byrd as Carter Farrell, Sam's best friend
- Regina King as Rhonda
- Julie Gonzalo as Shelby Cummings, Austin's girlfriend
- Lin Shaye as Mrs. Wells
- Madeline Zima as Brianna, Sam's older stepsister
  - Carlie Westerman as Young Brianna
- Andrea Avery as Gabriella, Sam's older stepsister
  - Lilli Babb as Young Gabriella
- Mary Pat Gleason as Eleanor
- Paul Rodriguez as Bobby
- Whip Hubley as Harold "Hal" Montgomery, Sam's widowed father
- Kevin Kilner as Andy Ames, Austin's father
- Erica Hubbard as Madison
- Simon Helberg as Terry
- Brad Bufanda as David
- J. D. Pardo as Ryan Hanson
- Kady Cole as Caitlyn
- Aimee Lynn Chadwick as Astrid
- James Eckhouse as Mr. Farrell
- Jonathan Slavin as Vernon
- John Billingsley as Mr. Rothman
- Art LaFleur as Football Coach
- Mike Randleman as Chuck

== Production ==
Clifford Werber conceived a 21st century adaptation of the Cinderella story due to its long-lasting appeal of being "the ultimate wish-fulfillment fantasy" with "an underlying message of empowerment."

== Release ==
A Cinderella Story premiered at Grauman's Chinese Theatre on July 10, 2004. It premiered in theaters with competition from other products that starred princesses or were fantasy-themed, such as The Prince & Me (2004), Ella Enchanted (2004) and The Princess Diaries 2: Royal Engagement (2004).

== Reception ==
=== Critical response ===
Initially panned by critics, the film subsequently developed a cult following. On Rotten Tomatoes, it holds an approval rating of 11% based on 102 reviews, with an average rating of 3.6/10. The website's critical consensus reads, "An uninspired, generic updating of the classic fairy tale." On Metacritic, the film has a weighted average score on 25 out of 100, based on 30 critics, indicating "generally unfavorable" reviews. Audiences polled by CinemaScore gave the film an average grade of "A−" on an A+ to F scale. In 2010, Time named it one of the top 10 worst chick flicks ever made.

Roger Ebert wrote that A Cinderella Story "is a lame, stupid movie, but Warner Bros. is spending a fortune to persuade [young audiences] to see it and recommend it". Other critics panned the plot as "simple, lazy storytelling" and "a dull rehash of the old girl-meets-boy chestnut". They noted that its attempts to modernize aspects of the source material were gimmicky and led to illogical plot elements, such as a cell phone being the film's glass slipper and Sam looking too pretty and cheerful for an outcast. Some particularly felt the use of a perfect teenager as a social reject delegitimized the moral of any average person believing in oneself.

The film was nominated for five Teen Choice Awards at the 2005 ceremony, winning the award for Choice Movie Blush Scene, the same year Duff won the Kids Choice Awards for Favorite Movie Actress.

=== Box office ===
In its opening weekend, the film grossed $13,623,350 in 2,625 theaters in the United States and Canada, ranking #4 at the box office, behind I, Robot, Spider-Man 2 and Anchorman: The Legend of Ron Burgundy. By the end of its run, A Cinderella Story grossed $51,438,175 domestically and $18,629,734 internationally, totaling $70,067,909 worldwide.

=== Accolades ===
The film won and was nominated for a number of awards throughout 2004–2005.

Year	Ceremony	Category	Recipients	Result
2004-2005	Teen Choice Awards	Choice Movie Actress: Comedy	Hilary Duff	Nominated
2004-2005	Teen Choice Awards	Choice Summer Movie	A Cinderella Story	Nominated
2004-2005	Teen Choice Awards	Choice Movie Blush Scene	Hilary Duff	Won
2004-2005	Teen Choice Awards	Choice Movie Liplock	Hilary Duff and Chad Michael Murray	Nominated
2004-2005	Teen Choice Awards	Choice Movie Sleazebag	Jennifer Coolidge	Won
2004-2005	Teen Choice Awards	Choice Movie Love Scene	Chad Michael Murray and Hilary Duff	Nominated
2004-2005	Teen Choice Awards	Choice Movie Chemistry	Hilary Duff and Chad Michael Murray	Nominated
2004-2005	Teen Choice Awards	Choice Date Movie	A Cinderella Story	Nominated
2005	Kids Choice Awards	Favorite Movie Actress	Hilary Duff	Won

== Film series ==
A Cinderella Story was followed by five direct-to-video films, each presenting a separate modern-day version of the Cinderella story: The sequels use the themes and situations that also borrow from the Cinderella tale, but do not contain any characters from the first film. Unlike the first film, the sequels also include musical, dance and holiday event themes.

Film title	Year	Director	Starring
Another Cinderella Story	2008	Damon Santostefano	Selena Gomez
A Cinderella Story: Once Upon a Song	2011	Damon Santostefano	Lucy Hale
A Cinderella Story: If the Shoe Fits	2016	Michelle Johnston	Sofia Carson
A Cinderella Story: Christmas Wish	2019	Michelle Johnston	Laura Marano
A Cinderella Story: Starstruck	2021	Michelle Johnston	Bailee Madison

== See also ==
- A Cinderella Story (soundtrack)
- List of films set around Halloween
