= A Cinderella Story (film series) =

American film series

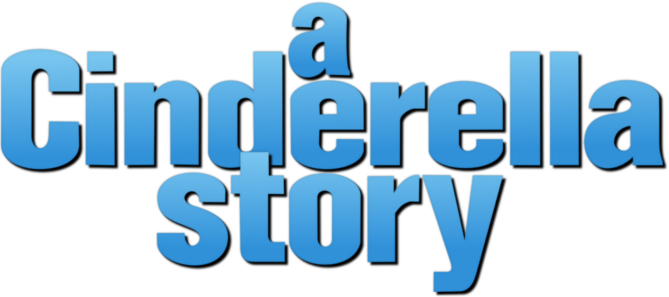
- Official logo
- Created by: Leigh Dunlap
- Original work: A Cinderella Story
- Owners: Warner Bros. Pictures (Skydance)
- Years: 2004–2021
- Based on: Cinderella by Charles Perrault

Films and television
- Film: A Cinderella Story (2004)
- Direct-to-video: Another Cinderella Story (2008); A Cinderella Story: Once Upon a Song (2011); A Cinderella Story: If the Shoe Fits (2016); A Cinderella Story: Christmas Wish (2019); A Cinderella Story: Starstruck (2021)

Audio
- Soundtracks: A Cinderella Story; Another Cinderella Story; A Cinderella Story: Once Upon a Song; A Cinderella Story: If the Shoe Fits; A Cinderella Story: Christmas Wish

A Cinderella Story is an American anthology series of films created by Leigh Dunlap and based on the Cinderella fairytale. The film series is owned and distributed by Warner Bros. Although the first film was theatrically released, all the remaining films were direct-to-video.

== Films ==
1. A Cinderella Story (2004)
2. Another Cinderella Story (2008)
3. A Cinderella Story: Once Upon a Song (2011)
4. A Cinderella Story: If the Shoe Fits (2016)
5. A Cinderella Story: Christmas Wish (2019)
6. A Cinderella Story: Starstruck (2021)

== Crew ==
| Crew/Detail | Film | | | | | |
| Crew/Detail | A Cinderella Story | Another Cinderella Story | A Cinderella Story: Once Upon a Song | A Cinderella Story: If the Shoe Fits | A Cinderella Story: Christmas Wish | A Cinderella Story: Starstruck |
| Crew/Detail | 2004 | 2008 | 2011 | 2016 | 2019 | 2021 |
|---|---|---|---|---|---|---|
| Director | Mark Rosman | Damon Santostefano | Damon Santostefano | Michelle Johnston | Michelle Johnston | Michelle Johnston |
| Producer(s) | Hunt Lowry; Dylan Sellers; Ilyssa Goodman; Clifford Werber | Dylan Sellers | Dylan Sellers | Dylan Sellers; Michelle Johnston | Dylan Sellers; Michelle Johnston | Dylan Sellers; Michelle Johnston |
| Writer(s) | Leigh Dunlap | Jessica Scott; Erik Patterson | Jessica Scott; Erik Patterson | Elena Song | Michelle Johnston | Michelle Johnston |
| Composer(s) | Christophe Beck | John Paesano | Braden Kimbell | Jake Monaco | Jake Monaco | Jake Monaco; Brittany Dunton |
| Distributor | Warner Bros. Pictures | Warner Premiere | Warner Premiere | Warner Home Video | Warner Bros. Home Entertainment | Warner Bros. Home Entertainment |
| Release date | July 16, 2004 | September 16, 2008 | September 6, 2011 | August 2, 2016 | October 15, 2019 | June 29, 2021 |
| Running time | 95 min | 92 min | 88 min | 93 min | 86 min | 100 min |
