= Cinderella (disambiguation) =

Cinderella is a classic fairy tale.

Cinderella may also refer to:

== Films ==
- Cinderella (1899 film) (French: Cendrillon), a French film directed by Georges Méliès
- Cinderella (1914 film), a silent film starring Mary Pickford
- Cinderella (1916 film), a German silent film directed by Urban Gad
- Cinderella (1922 film), a Disney animated short
- Cinderella (1930 film), an animated Felix the Cat film
- Cinderella (1937 film), a French comedy
- Cinderella (1947 film), a Soviet musical
- Cinderella (1950 film), an animated film by Walt Disney Animation Studios
  - Cinderella (1950 album), a storybook album adapted from the above animated film
- Cinderella (1955 film), a West German family film directed by Fritz Genschow
- Cinderella (1957 TV film), the original TV film of the Rodgers and Hammerstein musical, starring Julie Andrews
- Cinderella (1965 TV film), remake of Rodgers and Hammerstein's musical, starring Lesley Ann Warren
- Cinderella (1977 film), an American erotic musical comedy
- Cinderella (1979 film) (Russian: Золушка, romanized: Zolushka), a Soviet animated musical
- Cinderella, a 1996 Australian animated film produced by Burbank Animation Studios
- Cinderella (1997 film), a second TV film remake of Rodgers and Hammerstein's musical
- Cinderella (2000 film), starring Kathleen Turner
- Cinderella (2002 film), a Russian-Ukrainian musical
- Cinderella (2006 film), a South Korean horror film
- Cinderella (2012 Russian film), a Russian romantic comedy
- Cinderella (2015 American film), a Walt Disney Pictures live-action film
- Cinderella (2015 Indian film), a Marathi-language film
- Ratsasan (Tamil: ராட்சசன்), a 2018 Tamil-language film briefly known as Cinderella during production
- Cinderella (2021 American film), an American musical
- Cinderella (2021 Indian film), a Tamil-language film

== Television ==
- Cinderella (Apakah Cinta Hanyalah Mimpi?) ("Is Love Just a Dream?"), a 2007 Indonesian soap opera
- "Cinderella" (The Cleaner), a 2009 episode
- "Cinderella" (Faerie Tale Theatre), a 1985 episode
- "Cinderella" (Happily Ever After: Fairy Tales for Every Child), a 1995 episode
- "Cinderella" (Jake & Blake), a 2010 episode
- "Cinderella" (Super Why!), a 2007 episode
- "Cinderella" (Oh Baby), a 2000 episode
- "Cinderella" (The Paper Chase), a 1983 episode
- "Cinderella" (The Riches), a 2007 episode

== Ballet ==
- Cinderella (Fitinhof-Schell), a Russian ballet (premiered in 1893)
- Aschenbrödel (Cinderella), a ballet composed by Johann Strauss II (premiered in 1901)
- Cinderella, with music by Sidney Jones and choreography by Fred Farren (premiered in 1906)
- Cinderella (Prokofiev), a ballet composed by Sergei Prokofiev (premiered in 1945)
- Cinderella (Ashton) (1948), a comic ballet by Frederick Ashton, using Prokofiev's music

== Musicals ==
- Cinderella (Rodgers and Hammerstein musical), 1957
- Cinderella (Cliff Richard and the Shadows album), a 1967 cast album
- Rodgers + Hammerstein's Cinderella (Beane musical), an adaptation of the Rodgers and Hammerstein musical
  - Cinderella (2013 cast album)
- Cinderella (Lloyd Webber musical), 2020

== Opera ==
- Cendrillon (Isouard), 1810 opera by Nicolas Isouard
- La Cenerentola, 1817 opera by Gioachino Rossini
- Cendrillon (Massenet), 1899 opera by Jules Massenet
- Cendrillon (Viardot), 1904 chamber opera by Pauline Viardot
- La Cenicienta, 1966 children's opera by Jorge Peña Hen
- Cinderella (Deutscher), 2015 opera by Alma Deutscher

== Popular music ==
=== Songs ===
- "Cinderella" (CNBLUE song), 2015
- "Cinderella" (Diana Vickers song), 2013
- "Cinderella" (Firefall song), 1976
- "Cinderella" (i5 song), also covered by Play, Cheetah Girls, and Tata Young
- "Cinderella" (JKing song), 2023
- "Cinderella" (Krista Siegfrids song), 2014
- "Cinderella" (Lionel Richie song), 2000
- "Cinderella" (Mac Miller song), 2016
- "Cinderella" (Shakaya song), 2002
- "Cinderella" (Steven Curtis Chapman song), 2007
- "Cinderella" (Sweetbox song), 2001
- "Cinderella" (Vince Gill song), 1987
- "Cinderella" (Future, Metro Boomin and Travis Scott song), 2024
- "Cinderella" (Main Title), from the 1950 Disney film Cinderella, performed by the Jud Conlon Chorus and Marni Nixon, soundtrack released 1997
- "Cinderella", by Alexandra Joner
- "Cinderella", by America from Perspective
- "Cinderella", by Britney Spears from her self-titled third studio album, Britney
- "Cinderella", by Brotherhood of Man from B for Brotherhood
- "Cinderella", a Chris Brown remix of the Rihanna song "Umbrella"
- "Cinderella", by Diana Vickers from Music to Make Boys Cry
- "Cinderella", by Don Toliver from Love Sick
- "Cinderella", by Hooverphonic from A New Stereophonic Sound Spectacular
- "Cinderella", by Paul Anka
- "Cinderella", by Remi Wolf from Big Ideas
- "Cinderella", by The Sonics from Boom
- "O, Cinderella", by Richard Thompson from 13 Rivers

=== Other uses in popular music ===
- Cinderella Sanyu (born 1985), Ugandan musician also known as Cindy
- Cinderella (band), an American glam metal band
- Cinderella (Filipino band), a 1970s Manila sound pop group
- Cinderella (Sajjad Ali album), 2003

== People ==
- Cinderella (name), a female given name

== Other uses ==
- Cinderella (franchise), a Disney franchise based on the 1950 film
  - Cinderella (Disney character), the character from the Disney franchise
- Cinderella (fly), a genus of insects
- Cinderella (software), an interactive geometry software
- Cinderella (sports), a team or player who advances much further in a tournament than expected
- Cinderella, West Virginia, an unincorporated community and coal town
- Cinderella, or the Little Glass Slipper, a book illustrated by Marcia Brown
- Cinderella book, an Introduction to Automata Theory, Languages, and Computation
- Cinderella stamp, a non-postal stamp-like label
- Cinta Cinderella, 2025 Indonesian drama series
- MS Viking Cinderella, a 1989 Viking Line cruiseferry

== See also ==
- Cindarella, a trilobite-like animal from the Cambrian Chengjiang biota
- Cinderalla, a 2000 manga by Junko Mizuno
- A Cinderella Story (disambiguation)
- Cinderfella, a 1960 film starring Jerry Lewis
- Cindrella (film), a 2016 Sri Lankan romantic film
- Tjindarella, a play by Aboriginal Australian playwright Eva Johnson
