= Drew Seeley discography =

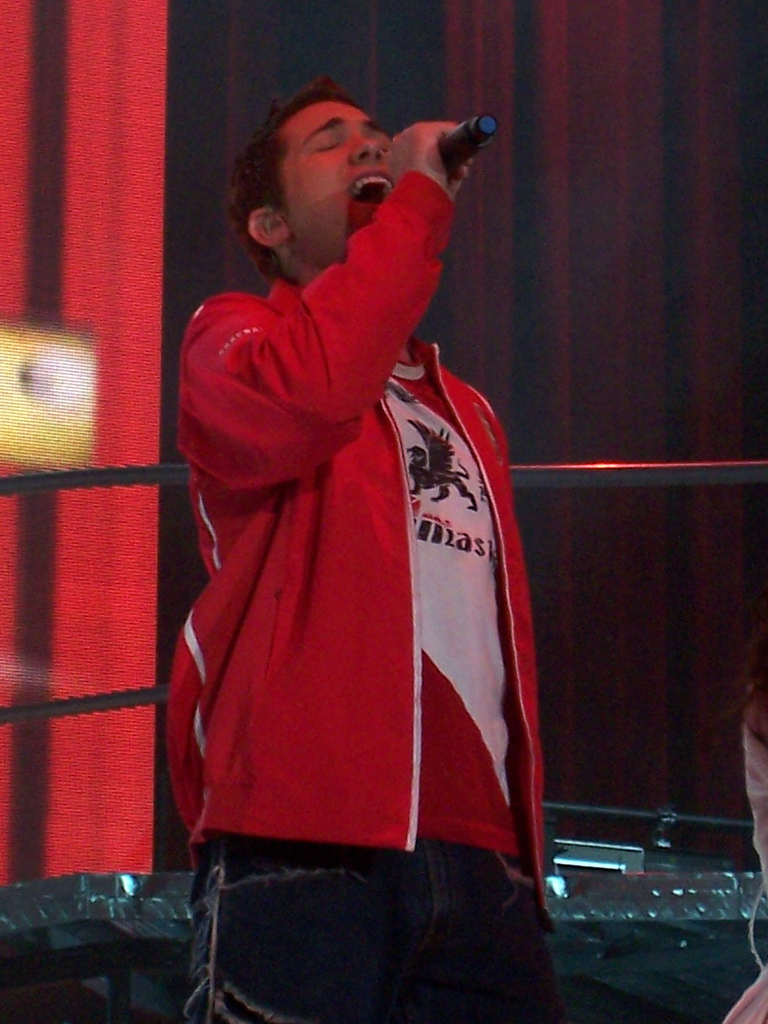
- Drew in 2006
- Studio albums: 3
- Extended plays: 3
- Singles: 18
- Music videos: 11

American singer Drew Seeley has released three studio albums, three extended plays, eighteen singles (including one as a featured artist), and made several other album appearances.

== Albums ==
=== Studio albums ===
List of albums
Title	Album details
~DS~	Released: November 6, 2006; Format: CD, digital download; Label: Independent
The Resolution	Released: April 5, 2011; Format: Digital download; Label: Drewzilla
Downtime	Released: March 29, 2018; Format: Digital download; Label: Drewzilla
What's My Name	Released: June 13, 2026; Format: Digital download; Label: Drewzilla

== Extended plays ==
List of EPs
Title	EP details
The Resolution - Act 1	Released: November 9, 2010; Format: Digital download; Label: Drewzilla
The Resolution - Act 2	Released: January 4, 2011; Format: Digital download; Label: Drewzilla
The Resolution - Act 3	Released: February 22, 2011; Format: Digital download; Label: Drewzilla

== Singles ==
=== As main artist ===
List of singles, with selected chart positions
Title	Year	Peak chart positions								Certifications	Album
Title	Year	US	US Pop	AUS	GER	IRL	NLD	NZ	UK	Certifications	Album
"Breaking Free"^{[A]} (with Zac Efron and Vanessa Hudgens)	2006	4	6	13	46	17	36	4	9	RIAA: Gold	High School Musical
"Get'cha Head in the Game"^{[A]} (with Corbin Bleu and Zac Efron)	2006	23	23	—	—	—	—	—	125	RIAA: Gold	High School Musical
"Dance with Me" (featuring Belinda)	2006	—^{[C]}	—	—	—	—	—	—	—		~DS~
"I'm Ready (Remix)"	2007	—	—	—	—	—	—	—	—		Jump In!
"Best at the Time"	2010	—	—	—	—	—	—	—	—		Non-album single
"Lazy Daze"	2011	—	—	—	—	—	—	—	—		The Resolution
"How a Heart Breaks"	2011	—	—	—	—	—	—	—	—		The Resolution
"Into the Fire"	2011	—	—	—	—	—	—	—	—		The Resolution
"Fly"	2012	—	—	—	—	—	—	—	—		Non-album singles
"Beautiful"	2012	—	—	—	—	—	—	—	—		Non-album singles
"Here and Now"	2013	—	—	—	—	—	—	—	—		Non-album singles
"Until the Sun Comes Up"	2013	—	—	—	—	—	—	—	—		Non-album singles
"Holiday Mood"	2013	—	—	—	—	—	—	—	—		Non-album singles
"If Only" (with Ana Free)	2014	—	—	—	—	—	—	—	—		Non-album singles
"Desire"	2015	—	—	—	—	—	—	—	—		Non-album singles
"Battle Lines"	2015	—	—	—	—	—	—	—	—		Non-album singles
"Twisted"	2015	—	—	—	—	—	—	—	—		Non-album singles
"Heartbreak Waiting to Happen"	2015	—	—	—	—	—	—	—	—		
"The Last Time"	2015	—	—	—	—	—	—	—	—		
"Heart Ain't Home"	2015	—	—	—	—	—	—	—	—		
"Stowin' Away (In Santa's Sleigh)"	2015	—	—	—	—	—	—	—	—		
"Billion Dollar Girl"	2017	—	—	—	—	—	—	—	—		
"Feels So Much Better to Love"	2017	—	—	—	—	—	—	—	—		
"Here's Your Heart Back"	2018	—	—	—	—	—	—	—	—		
"DownTime"	2018	—	—	—	—	—	—	—	—		
"Christmas NYC"	2019	—	—	—	—	—	—	—	—		
"Take Back Love"	2021	—	—	—	—	—	—	—	—		
"Rich Kids"	2021	—	—	—	—	—	—	—	—		
"All in Time"	2021	—	—	—	—	—	—	—	—		
"Behind a Cloud"	2022	—	—	—	—	—	—	—	—		
"Piece of My Heart"	2022	—	—	—	—	—	—	—	—		
"Dissatisfaction"	2023	—	—	—	—	—	—	—	—		
"Bet on It"	2023	—	—	—	—	—	—	—	—		
"CLARK KENT"	2023	—	—	—	—	—	—	—	—		
"Beautiful World"	2023	—	—	—	—	—	—	—	—		
"SUMMERTIME"	2026	—	—	—	—	—	—	—	—		
"There Goes My Heart"	2026	—	—	—	—	—	—	—	—		
"Love's Fault"	2026	—	—	—	—	—	—	—	—		
"In This For Life"	2026	—	—	—	—	—	—	—	—		
"U"	2026	—	—	—	—	—	—	—	—		
"Crush"	2026	—	—	—	—	—	—	—	—		
"—" denotes releases that did not chart or were not released in that territory.

=== As featured artist ===
List of singles, with selected chart positions and certifications, showing year released and album name
Title	Year	Peak chart positions						Certifications	Album
Title	Year	US	US Pop	AUS	IRL	NZ	UK	Certifications	Album
"We're All in This Together"^{[A]} (among High School Musical cast)	2006	34	32	86	31	14	40	RIAA: Gold	High School Musical

== Other charted songs ==
List of singles, with selected chart positions
Title	Year	Peak chart positions				Certifications	Album
Title	Year	US	US Pop	CAN	UK	Certifications	Album
"Start of Something New"^{[A]} (with Vanessa Hudgens and Zac Efron)	2006	28	30	—	90	RIAA: Gold	High School Musical
"What I've Been Looking For (Reprise)"^{[A]} (with Vanessa Hudgens and Zac Efron)	2006	67	53	—	—		High School Musical
"New Classic" (with Selena Gomez)	2009	—^{[D]}	—	—	—		Another Cinderella Story
"—" denotes releases that did not chart or were not released in that territory.

== Other appearances ==
Title	Year	Other artist(s)	Album
"Join the Party"	2005	—N/a	Byou
"Someday My Prince Will Come"	2006	Ashley Tisdale	Disneymania 4
"Start of Something New"	2006	Vanessa Hudgens and Zac Efron	High School Musical
"What I've Been Looking For (Reprise)"	2006	Vanessa Hudgens and Zac Efron	High School Musical
"We're All In This Together"	2006	High School Musical cast	High School Musical
"I Can't Take My Eyes Off of You"	2006	Vanessa Hudgens, Ashley Tisdale and Lucas Grabeel	High School Musical
"Find Yourself"	2007	—N/a	Disneymania 5
"I'll Be Home for Christmas"	2007	—N/a	Disney Channel Holiday
"You'll Be in My Heart"	2008	—N/a	Disneymania 6
"Shake Your Groove Thing"	2008	The Chipmunks	Undeniable
"New Classic"	2008	Selena Gomez	Another Cinderella Story
"Just That Girl"	2008	—N/a	Another Cinderella Story
"1st Class Girl"	2008	Marcus Paulk	Another Cinderella Story
"X-Plain It to My Heart"	2008	—N/a	Another Cinderella Story
"You Can Do Magic"	2009	—N/a	Wizards of Waverly Place
"Love's in Vein"	2009	Frankie Blue	I Kissed a Vampire
"Just a Little Peck"	2009	Lucas Grabeel and Adrian Slade	I Kissed a Vampire
"Happily Afterlife"	2009	Lucas Grabeel and Adrian Slade	I Kissed a Vampire
"Her Voice"	2010	—N/a	Disneymania 7
"Dance for Life"	2011	—N/a	Shake It Up: Break It Down
"A Space in the Stars"	2012	—N/a	Shake It Up: Live 2 Dance
"For The Better"	2012	—N/a	The Unattended
"I Do"	2013	—N/a	Shake It Up: I <3 Dance

== Music videos ==
List of music videos, showing year released and director
Title	Year	Notes
"Dance with Me"	2006	
"Ni Freud ni tu mamá"	2006	Belinda's music video; guest appearance
"If We Were"	2008	Belinda's music video; guest appearance
"New Classic"	2009	
"Lazy Daze"	2011	
"How a Heart Breaks"	2011	
"Fly"	2012	
"Beautiful"	2012	
"Into the Fire"	2013	
"Summer Crush"	2013	
"Until the Sun Comes Up"	2013	
"Remember the Thyme"	2014	
"Feels So Much Better to Love"	2017	
"In This For Life"	2026	

== Notes ==
Notes

- A: Seeley sang in several of the songs of High School Musical, his voice being mixed with Zac Efron's, but he originally wasn't given credit for singing.
- B: Seeley sang in several of the songs of StarStruck, his voice being mixed with Sterling Knight's, but he originally wasn't given credit for singing.
- C: "Dance with Me" did not enter the Billboard Hot 100, but peaked at number 20 on the Bubbling Under Hot 100 Singles chart.
- D: "New Classic" did not enter the Billboard Hot 100, but peaked at number 14 on the Bubbling Under Hot 100 Singles chart.
