= Another Cinderella Story (soundtrack) =

Soundtrack album by Various artists
- Released: August 26, 2008
- Recorded: November 2007-April 2008
- Genres: Pop, hip hop
- Length: 1:40:36
- Label: Razor & Tie
- Producers: Antonina Armato; Ralph Churchwell; Michael Nielsen; Steve Walsh; DJ Blak; John Paesano

Singles from Another Cinderella Story
- 1. "Tell Me Something I Don't Know" Released: August 5, 2008

Another Cinderella Story is the soundtrack album from the 2008 film Another Cinderella Story. The album was released as a physical CD and digital download on August 26, 2008 by Razor & Tie. The album debuted number eight on the Billboard Top Soundtracks chart and has sold over 1,200,000 copies.

== Critical reception ==
Mark Morton of AllMusic gave a review of the album: "Another Cinderella Story is a dynamic dance and music-filled update of the classic Cinderella fable starring up and coming actress/singer Selena Gomez. The soundtrack is loaded with modern pop and hip hop music, enchanting atmosphere of the film and its characters. Gomez performs the lead track and smash single "Tell Me Something I Don't Know", as well as three other songs on the album. Co-star and Gomez's film love interest Drew Seeley adds his heart-throb flair to five tracks as well".

== Track listing ==
No.	Title	Writer(s)	Performed by	Length
1.	"Tell Me Something I Don't Know"	Antonina Armato, Ralph Churchwell, Michael Nielsen	Selena Gomez	3:20
2.	"New Classic"	Churchwell, Nielsen, Seeley, Joleen Belle	Drew Seeley and Selena Gomez	3:08
3.	"Hurry Up and Save Me"	Armato, Churchwell, Nielsen	Tiffany Giardina	3:50
4.	"Just That Girl"	Churchwell, Nielsen, Seeley	Drew Seeley	3:17
5.	"Bang a Drum"	Churchwell, Nielsen, Belle	Selena Gomez	3:12
6.	"1st Class Girl"	Churchwell, Nielsen, Paulk, Seeley	Marcus Paulk and Drew Seeley	3:00
7.	"Hold 4 You"	Churchwell, Nielsen, Belle, Damon Santostefano, Erik Patterson, Jessica Scott	Jane Lynch	2:29
8.	"Valentine's Dance Tango"	Churchwell, Nielsen, Cheche Alara	The Twins	2:12
9.	"No Average Angel"	Steve Walsh, Jill Walsh, Richard Hammond	Tiffany Giardin	2:57
10.	"Don't Be Shy"	Lloyd Turner, Terrence Hancock, Phillip Green, Carl Dorsey	Small Change featuring Lil' JJ and Chani	4:03
11.	"X-Plain It to My Heart"	Seeley, Churchwell, Nielsen	Drew Seeley	1:15
12.	"New Classic" (live version)	Churchwell, Nielsen, Seeley, Belle	Drew Seeley and Selena Gomez	5:29
13.	"Another Cinderella Story" (score suite)	Paesano	John Paesano	2:39
Total length:				40:12

Digital edition bonus track
No.	Title	Writer(s)	Performed by	Length
14.	"New Classic" (acoustic version)	Churchwell, Nielsen, Seeley, Belle	Drew Seeley	2:41
Total length:				42:53

Another Cinderella Story EP – Featuring Selena Gomez track list
No.	Title	Writer(s)	Length
1.	"Tell Me Something I Don't Know"	Antonina Armato; Ralph Churchwell; Michael Nielsen	3:20
2.	"Bang a Drum"	Churchwell; Nielsen; Joleen Belle	3:12
3.	"New Classic"	Andrew Seeley; Churchwell; Nielsen; Joleen Belle	3:09
4.	"Tell Me Something I Don't Know" (music video)		3:20
5.	"New Classic" (with Drew Seeley) (music video)		3:30
Total length:			20:10

== Charts ==
Chart (2008)	Peak position
US Billboard 200	116
US Billboard Top Soundtracks	8

== Release history ==
Country	Date	Format	Label
United States	August 26, 2008	Digital download	Razor & Tie
Canada	August 26, 2008	Digital download	Razor & Tie
Australia	August 26, 2008	Digital download	Razor & Tie
United Kingdom	August 26, 2008	Digital download	Razor & Tie
United States	June 16, 2009 (Another Cinderella Story EP – Featuring Selena Gomez)	Digital download	Razor & Tie
Canada	June 16, 2009 (Another Cinderella Story EP – Featuring Selena Gomez)	Digital download	Razor & Tie
