= Tell Me Something I Don't Know (Selena Gomez song) =

2008 single by Selena Gomez

Single by Selena Gomez

from the album Another Cinderella Story
- Released: August 5, 2008
- Recorded: December 10, 2007
- Genre: Electronic rock; pop rock
- Length: 3:21
- Label: Razor & Tie
- Songwriters: Antonina Armato; Ralph Churchwell; Michael Nielsen
- Producers: Ralph Churchwell; Michael Nielsen

Selena Gomez singles chronology
"Tell Me Something I Don't Know" (2008)	"Come & Get It" (2013)

A Cinderella Story singles chronology
"Our Lips Are Sealed" (2004)	"Tell Me Something I Don't Know" (2008)

Music video
- "Tell Me Something I Don't Know" on YouTube

"Tell Me Something I Don't Know" is the debut single by Selena Gomez. The song was released as the sole single from the film, Another Cinderella Story soundtrack on August 5, 2008, and a Radio Disney version (which removes the Hurricane Katrina reference during the semi-rap interlude; this version is also used for the music video) was released on September 9, 2008 digitally. It peaked at number 58 on the Billboard Hot 100.

A re-recorded version with all new production by Rock Mafia with Gomez' band Selena Gomez & the Scene, was featured on their debut album Kiss & Tell (2009), and Gomez' compilation album For You (2014), both released by Hollywood Records.

== Chart performance ==
Released digitally in August 2008, the song sold 44,000 downloads within its first two months, largely due to airplay on Radio Disney. The song was featured in promotional spots for the ABC Family premiere of Another Cinderella Story, and had a 60% sales increase—reaching 30,000 downloads during the week of January 18, 2009, when the film aired on the network. The song peaked at number 58 on the US Billboard Hot 100 chart, becoming the singer’s first ever entry in the American chart, and at number 13 on both the Australian Hitseekers Singles chart and the UK Independent Singles Breakers Chart. As of May 2017, the song has sold 1.1 million copies in the United States, making it Gomez's eighth best-selling song downloads-wise.

== Music video ==
The music video was directed by Elliott Lester. The video starts with scenes reminiscent of (but not from) the film; Gomez cleaning a house and the maid yelling at her. Gomez then leaves the house and performs a dance routine with her backup dancers, while the maid watches from the house window. The video also features Gomez in front of a black background with lyrics from the song flying around her.

== Charts ==
Chart (2008–2010)	Peak position
Australian Hitseekers Singles	13
US Billboard Hot 100	58
UK Independent Singles Breakers Chart (OCC)	13
