= Abandoned (2022 film) =

2022 American horror film by Spencer Squire

- Theatrical release poster
- Directed by: Spencer Squire
- Written by: Erik Patterson; Jessica Scott
- Produced by: Robert Ogden Barnum; Eric Binns; Emma Roberts; Byron Wetzel; Jessica Tissera; Jason Tissera
- Starring: Emma Roberts; John Gallagher Jr.; Michael Shannon
- Cinematography: Corey C. Waters
- Edited by: Matthew L. Weiss
- Music by: Michelle Osis
- Production companies: Before The Door Pictures; Three Point Capital; Vertical Entertainment
- Distributed by: Vertical Entertainment; VVS Films
- Release date: June 17, 2022
- Running time: 102 minutes
- Country: United States
- Language: English
- Box office: $96,761

Abandoned is a 2022 American horror film directed by Spencer Squire and written by Erik Patterson and Jessica Scott. The film stars Emma Roberts, John Gallagher Jr. and Michael Shannon. The film was Squire's feature film directorial debut, with Roberts serving as one of the producers.

The film was released on June 17, 2022, and received negative reviews from critics.

== Plot ==
Sara and Alex Davis move with their infant son, Liam, into a farmhouse in the countryside, hoping for a fresh start. While Alex is enthusiastic, Sara struggles with new motherhood and feels unsettled. When Sara asks why the house has sat empty, the realtor explains that decades earlier a young woman named Anna Solomon killed her baby and father before taking her own life. Despite the story, Sara insists on buying the property.

Sara feels increasingly distant from Liam, who refuses to breastfeed, and spends long days alone while Alex works as a veterinarian. Exploring the house, she and Alex discover a locked room that appears to have belonged to a child. They meet their neighbor, Chris Renner, who offers help around the property. Sara later learns that Chris is Anna’s brother, who grew up in the house under their abusive father, Robert.

Strange occurrences begin: Sara hears children playing behind a door blocked by a wardrobe, and family belongings start to vanish. She sees visions of Anna and Robert, which further unsettle her. One night, while distracted by an apparition, Liam nearly falls down the stairs. Alarmed, Alex calls psychiatrist Dr. Carver, who prescribes medication. Sara resists, fearing it will prevent her from connecting with her son.

Chris admits his past to Sara, explaining that Robert had abused Anna and neglected him. He warns her not to move the wardrobe, saying only Robert ever could. As Sara grows closer to Chris, Alex becomes more concerned about her mental health.

Sara pretends to take her medication but continues to experience terrifying visions. During a bath, she is nearly drowned by the apparition of Robert. Later, while watching over Liam, she hears screams and footsteps, followed by Alex’s voice calling to her. When she returns upstairs, Liam is gone, and the blocked room has been opened. Inside are all the missing belongings. Two ghostly boys emerge, one holding Liam, and accuse Sara of harming her son. As one raises a hatchet, Sara screams and the screen fades to black.

The next morning, Sara appears calm and happy, holding Liam and reassuring Alex that everything is fine. Life seems to return to normal: Chris teaches Liam baseball, and the family spends time together. The film ends with Sara smiling on a swing with Alex and Liam, her hand resting on her pregnant belly.

== Cast ==
- Emma Roberts as Sara Davis
- John Gallagher Jr. as Alex Davis
- Michael Shannon as Chris Renner
- Paul Schneider as Dr. Carver
- Kate Arrington as Cindy
- Paul Dillion as Harrington
- Marie May as Infant Liam
- Addy Miller as Anna Solomon
- Justin Matthew Smith as Robert Solomon

== Release ==
The film was released on June 17, 2022, by Vertical Entertainment.

== Production ==
=== Filming ===
The film was filmed around North Carolina in Piedmont region. The principal photography took place around September and October 2021.

== Reception ==
=== Box office ===
Abandoned was released from 54 theaters in United States and it grossed $21,149 on the first day, $59,761 in three days, and $96,761 in one week.

=== Critical response ===
Metacritic review
breakdown (unweighted)

Positive
1 (14%)
Mixed
4 (57%)
Negative
2 (29%)

On the review aggregator website Rotten Tomatoes, 16% of 25 critics' reviews are positive, with an average rating of 4.00/10. The website's consensus reads: "Horror fans seeking effective frights will almost certainly feel Abandoned by this well-cast but deeply disappointing haunted house story." Metacritic, which uses a weighted average, assigned the film a score of 38 out of 100, based on 7 critics, indicating "generally unfavorable" reviews.

Alexander Harrison from Screen Rant rated the film 2 out of 5 stars and wrote: "Abandoned has a few things in its favor, but a disappointing conclusion obscures them while making the movie's flaws even more prominent."

Brian Tallerico of RogerEbert.com gave the film a 1½ star out of 4 stars and wrote: "There's just no meat on this film's bones. Gallagher gets a non-character and Roberts is left hanging by being forced to play post-partum as a horror trope. Just because it was made during the pandemic doesn't mean viewers should feel sick when they're done watching it." Elizabeth Weitzman of TheWrap gave the film a negative review and she wrote: A listless thriller that can't find its footing, "Abandoned" does occasionally rouse itself enough to suggest a better movie that never comes to pass.
