= Erik Patterson =

American dramatist

Erik Patterson is an American screenwriter, television writer, and playwright.

== Life and career ==
Erik is a graduate of Occidental College and the British American Drama Academy.

His plays have been produced by Echo Theater Company, Playwrights' Arena, the Los Angeles Theatre Center, Theatre of NOTE, Evidence Room, and The Actors' Gang, and developed through the Lark Play Development Center, Moving Arts, Black Dahlia, Naked Angels, and the Mark Taper Forum. He has had monologues published by Heinemann and Smith & Kraus.

He has written screenplays for Warner Premiere, ABC Family, the Disney Channel, The Hatchery, and Universal.

Erik currently lives in Los Angeles, California.

== Awards ==
He won the 2026 Julie Harris Playwriting Prize from the Beverly Hills Theatre Guild for his play Oakwood High School Presents Thornton Wilder's Our Town.

He won a 2012 Humanitas Prize for "Radio Rebel".

He won a 2010 Writers Guild of America Award for Best Children's Script (Long Form) for Another Cinderella Story.

He was nominated in the 40th Daytime Emmy Awards for Outstanding Writing in a Children's Series for "R.L. Stine's The Haunting Hour". He was nominated in the same category for the 41st Daytime Emmy Awards.

His play He Asked For It was nominated for a 2009 GLAAD Media Award for Outstanding Los Angeles Theater. It was nominated for a 2008 Ovation Award for World Premiere Playwriting, as well as being named one of the Top 10 Plays of 2008 by Frontiers Magazine. In 2003, his play Yellow Flesh Alabaster Rose won a Backstage West Garland Award for Best Playwriting and was a finalist for the PEN USA Literary Award. In 2004, his play Red Light Green Light was nominated for an Ovation Award for World Premiere Playwriting.

His play "One of the Nice Ones" was nominated for a 2016 Ovation Award for World Premiere Playwriting, and it won the 2017 Los Angeles Drama Critics Circle Award for Best Playwriting.

== Work ==
=== Plays ===
- Oakwood High School Presents Thornton Wilder's Our Town (2026)
- F**king Strangers (2026)
- Handjob (2019)
- One of the Nice Ones (2016)
- "The Sex Lives of Strangers" (unproduced)
- Sick (2010)
- He Asked for It (2008)
- Red Light Green Light (2004)
- Yellow Flesh Alabaster Rose (2003)
- Tonseisha (2001)

=== Film and TV ===
Movies
Year	Title	Film production
2022	Abandoned	Vertical Entertainment
2021	Sister Swap: Christmas in the City	Hallmark Channel
2021	Sister Swap: A Hometown Holiday	Hallmark Channel
2018	Deep Blue Sea 2	Warner Bros.
2017	Love at First Bark	Hallmark Channel
2016	Love on a Limb	Hallmark Channel
2015	The Christmas Note	Lighthouse Pictures
2015	Love Under the Stars	Two 4 The Money Media
2014	Sophia Grace & Rosie's Royal Adventure	Warner Bros.
2012	Radio Rebel	Disney Channel
2011	A Cinderella Story: Once Upon a Song	Warner Premiere
2008	Another Cinderella Story	Warner Premiere

He has written several episodes of the television series R.L. Stine's The Haunting Hour including:

- "Best Friend Forever" (1.12)
- "Wrong Number" (1.16)
- "The Perfect Brother" (1.20)
- "Pumpkinhead" (2.5)
- "Brush With Madness" (2.6)
- "The Hole" (2.10)
- "Stage Fright" (2.15)
- "Grampires: Part 1" (3.1)
- "Grampires: Part 2" (3.2)
- "Poof de Fromage" (3.15)
- "Funhouse"
- "Bad Egg"
- "Near Mint Condition"
- "Return of the Pumpkinheads"
