= Mère et Fille =

- Country of origin: France
- Original language: French

Original release
- Network: Disney Channel France
- Release: 3 June 2012 – January 2014

Mère et Fille (English: "Mother and Daughter") is a French comedy television series which premiered on 3 June 2012 on Disney Channel France.

== Plot ==
The series tells the life of 14-year-old Barbara and her mother, Isabelle, who is a divorced lawyer.

== Cast and characters ==
- Isabelle Desplantes as Isabelle Marteau
- Lubna Gourion as Barbara Marteau
- Thérèse Roussel as Barbara's grandmother
- Thomas Goldberg as Raphaël
- Arthur Jacquin as Gaël
- Clara Leroux as Léa, Barbara's friend
- Romain Arnolin as Hugo, Barbara' friend
- Lillia Alami as Pauline, Hugo's little sister
- Alain Bouzigues as Mr Balain
- Philippe Cura as Gaël's Father
- Grégory Le Moigne as Laurent, Barbara's Father
- Claudia Tagbo as Claudia, Hugo's mother
- Philémon as the virtual coach

== Episodes ==
=== Season 3 (2014) ===
The third season premiered on Disney Channel France on 13 May 2014. The episodes are compounds of four mini-episodes.

=== Movie (2016) ===
Mère et Fille: California Dream tells the story of Barbara, a girl who has won a fashion contest, but the problem is that the contest takes place in California and she lives in Paris. Laura Marano makes a cameo in the film. It has been referred to and marketed as the first French Disney Channel Original Movie.

=== Season 4 (2017) ===
On 18 March 2017, a special episode surrounding around Barbara turning 20 years old aired as part of Disney Channel France's 20th anniversary programming. It was announced that the fourth season will start airing on 8 April 2017. In this season, Barbara would be 17 years old, and Isabelle 42 years old.
