= Warner Premiere =

Direct-to-video label of Warner Bros. Home Entertainment

- Warner Premiere logo used from 2007 to 2013
- Type: Direct-to-video label of Warner Bros. Home Entertainment
- Industry: Home video
- Founded: 2006; 20 years ago
- Defunct: 2013; 13 years ago
- Fate: Folded into Warner Bros. Home Entertainment and Warner Bros. Animation
- Successors: Studio: Universal Pictures Warner Bros. Home Entertainment; Warner Bros. Animation; Warner Bros. Games; Warner Max (folded into Warner Bros. Pictures); Library: Warner Bros.
- Headquarters: 4000 Warner Boulevard, Burbank, California, United States
- Products: Physical and digital video releases
- Owner: Time Warner
- Parent: Warner Bros. Home Entertainment (Warner Bros.)
- Divisions: Raw Feed; Warner Premiere Digital

Warner Premiere Inc. was an American direct-to-video label of Warner Bros. Home Entertainment, itself a subsidiary of Warner Bros. Entertainment founded in 2006. It was folded into Warner Bros. Home Entertainment and Warner Bros. Animation in 2013.

== Company History ==
=== Early years (2006–2008) ===
In 2006, Warner Bros. Home Entertainment announced that they would enter the market of releasing original direct-to-video films, a market that had proven lucrative for studios over the past few years. They announced much of their output would be follow-ups to films that had done well at the box office theatrically, but wouldn't be expected to do well if a sequel were to be made. The first release under the Warner Premiere banner was the prequel film The Dukes of Hazzard: The Beginning. Their second release was a sequel to the 1999 horror film House on Haunted Hill titled Return to House on Haunted Hill. In addition to the live-action output, the label was used for several direct-to-video animated films from Warner's corporate siblings such as DC Comics and Warner Bros. Animation.

The label released Get Smart's Bruce and Lloyd: Out of Control, a spin-off of the 2008 film Get Smart, on DVD and Blu-ray on July 1, 2008. The film follows the adventures of the two tech experts from the first film played by Masi Oka and Nate Torrence, respectively. It was also written by the two writers of the previous film.

=== Later years (2008–2013) ===
On July 29, 2008, Warner Premiere released Lost Boys: The Tribe, a sequel to the 1987 horror film The Lost Boys, on DVD and Blu-ray. Corey Feldman reprised his role of vampire hunter Edgar Frog; Corey Haim appeared in a cameo. In September 2008, Warner Premiere released the direct-to-DVD sequel of Hilary Duff's hit film A Cinderella Story titled Another Cinderella Story, starring Selena Gomez. After the 2009 Sundance Film Festival, Warner Bros. announced through Warner Premiere that the film Spring Breakdown would be released straight-to-DVD on April 9 according to Home Media Magazine.

A sub-label of Warner Premiere was Raw Feed, which released horror/thriller films and Warner Premiere Digital, which released original internet projects.

Due to growing economic uncertainty and being a huge slump on the DVD market, Warner Bros. announced in 2012 that it had shut down Warner Premiere after six years of operation. Despite this, titles continued to be published under the Warner Premiere label until the following year, with the last being Scooby-Doo! Stage Fright.

== Filmography ==
| Year | Title | Director(s) | Co-production company(s) |
|---|---|---|---|
| 2007 | The Dukes of Hazzard: The Beginning | Robert Berlinger | Gerber Pictures / Hollywood Media Bridge |
| 2007 | Superman: Doomsday | Bruce Timm / Lauren Montgomery / Brandon Vietti | Warner Bros. Animation |
| 2007 | Return to House on Haunted Hill | Víctor Garcia | Dark Castle Home Entertainment |
| 2007 | A Dennis the Menace Christmas | Ron Oliver | Sneak Preview Entertainment / Valkyrie Films |
| 2007 | Ben 10: Race Against Time | Alex Winter | Cartoon Network Studios / Man of Action Entertainment / Trouper Productions |
| 2008 | Justice League: The New Frontier | Dave Bullock | Warner Bros. Animation |
| 2008 | Get Smart's Bruce and Lloyd: Out of Control | Gil Junger | Mad Chance / Mosaic Media Group / Callahan Filmworks |
| 2008 | Batman: Gotham Knight | Toshi Hiruma / Bruce Timm | Warner Bros. Animation |
| 2008 | Lost Boys: The Tribe | P. J. Pesce | Thunder Road Film / Hollywood Media Bridge |
| 2008 | Another Cinderella Story | Damon Santostefano | Dylan Sellers Productions |
| 2008 | Scooby-Doo! and the Goblin King | Joe Sichta | Warner Bros. Animation / Hanna-Barbera |
| 2008 | The Clique | Michael Lembeck | Alloy Entertainment / Bankable Productions |
| 2009 | Ace Ventura Jr: Pet Detective | David Mickey Evans | Morgan Creek Productions |
| 2009 | Wonder Woman | Lauren Montgomery | Warner Bros. Animation |
| 2009 | Watchmen: Tales of the Black Freighter | Daniel DelPurgatorio / Mike Smith | Paramount Pictures / Legendary Pictures |
| 2009 | Under the Hood | Eric Matthies | Paramount Pictures / Legendary Pictures |
| 2009 | Scooby-Doo! and the Samurai Sword | Joe Sichta | Warner Bros. Animation / Hanna-Barbera |
| 2009 | Spring Breakdown | Ryan Shiraki | Code Entertainment |
| 2009 | Mr. Troop Mom | William Dear | Encanto Enterprises |
| 2009 | Green Lantern: First Flight | Lauren Montgomery | Warner Bros. Animation |
| 2009 | Scooby-Doo! The Mystery Begins | Brian Levant | Cartoon Network |
| 2009 | Superman/Batman: Public Enemies | Sam Liu | Warner Bros. Animation / DC Entertainment |
| 2009 | The Hills Run Red | Dave Parker | Dark Castle Home Entertainment / Fever Dreams |
| 2009 | Trick 'r Treat | Michael Dougherty | Legendary Pictures / Bad Hat Harry |
| 2009 | Ben 10: Alien Swarm | Alex Winter | Cartoon Network Studios / Man of Action Entertainment / Trouper Productions |
| 2009 | A Miser Brothers' Christmas | Dave Barton Thomas | Warner Bros. Animation / Cuppa Coffee Studios |
| 2010 | Scooby-Doo! Abracadabra-Doo | Spike Brandt / Tony Cervone | Warner Bros. Animation / Hanna-Barbera |
| 2010 | Justice League: Crisis on Two Earths | Sam Liu / Lauren Montgomery | Warner Bros. Animation / DC Entertainment |
| 2010 | Free Willy: Escape from Pirate's Cove | Will Geiger | ApolloMovie / Film Afrika |
| 2010 | Preacher's Kid | Stan Foster | Gener8Xion Entertainment / Epidemic Pictures / Stan Foster Pictures |
| 2010 | Batman: Under the Red Hood | Brandon Vietti | Warner Bros. Animation / DC Entertainment |
| 2010 | Tom and Jerry Meet Sherlock Holmes | Spike Brandt / Jeff Siergey | Warner Bros. Animation / Turner Entertainment Co. |
| 2010 | Scooby-Doo! Camp Scare | Ethan Spaulding | Warner Bros. Animation / Hanna-Barbera |
| 2010 | Superman/Batman: Apocalypse | Lauren Montgomery | Warner Bros. Animation / DC Entertainment |
| 2010 | Lost Boys: The Thirst | Dario Piana | Thunder Road Film / Hollywood Media Bridge / Film Afrika / ApolloMovie |
| 2010 | Superman/Shazam!: The Return of Black Adam | Joaquim Dos Santos | Warner Bros. Animation / DC Entertainment |
| 2011 | All-Star Superman | Sam Liu | Warner Bros. Animation / DC Entertainment |
| 2011 | Scooby-Doo! Curse of the Lake Monster | Brian Levant | Cartoon Network / Atlas Entertainment / Nine / 8 Entertainment / Telvan Productions |
| 2011 | Happiness Is a Warm Blanket, Charlie Brown | Andy Beall / Frank Molieri | WildBrain |
| 2011 | Green Lantern: Emerald Knights | Christopher Berkeley / Lauren Montgomery / Jay Oliva | Warner Bros. Animation / DC Entertainment |
| 2011 | Tom and Jerry and the Wizard of Oz | Spike Brandt / Tony Cervone | Warner Bros. Animation / Turner Entertainment Co. |
| 2011 | A Cinderella Story: Once Upon a Song | Damon Santostefano | Dylan Sellers Productions |
| 2011 | Scooby-Doo! Legend of the Phantosaur | Ethan Spaulding | Warner Bros. Animation / Hanna-Barbera |
| 2011 | Batman: Year One | Sam Liu / Lauren Montgomery | Warner Bros. Animation / DC Entertainment |
| 2012 | Justice League: Doom | Lauren Montgomery | Warner Bros. Animation / DC Entertainment |
| 2012 | Scooby-Doo! Music of the Vampire | David Block | Warner Bros. Animation / Hanna-Barbera |
| 2012 | Superman vs. The Elite | Michael Chang | Warner Bros. Animation / DC Entertainment |
| 2012 | Batman: The Dark Knight Returns – Part 1 | Jay Oliva | Warner Bros. Animation / DC Entertainment |
| 2012 | Tom and Jerry: Robin Hood and His Merry Mouse | Spike Brandt / Tony Cervone | Warner Bros. Animation / Turner Entertainment Co. |
| 2012 | Big Top Scooby-Doo! | David Block | Warner Bros. Animation / Hanna-Barbera |
| 2012 | A Christmas Story 2 | Brian Levant | Hollywood Media Bridge / Telvan Productions |
| 2012 | Thunderstruck | John Whitesell | Karz Entertainment / Goodwin Sports |
| 2013 | Batman: The Dark Knight Returns – Part 2 | Jay Oliva | Warner Bros. Animation / DC Entertainment |
| 2013 | Scooby-Doo! Mask of the Blue Falcon | Michael Goguen | Warner Bros. Animation / Hanna-Barbera |
| 2013 | Superman: Unbound | James Tucker | Warner Bros. Animation / DC Entertainment |
| 2013 | Lego Batman: The Movie – DC Super Heroes Unite | Jon Burton | Warner Bros. Animation / TT Animation / DC Entertainment |
| 2013 | House Party: Tonight's the Night | Darin Scott | Film Afrika Worldwide |
| 2013 | Justice League: The Flashpoint Paradox | Jay Oliva | Warner Bros. Animation / DC Entertainment |
| 2013 | Scooby-Doo! Stage Fright | Victor Cook | Warner Bros. Animation / Hanna-Barbera |

=== Warner Premiere Digital ===
| Year | Title | Channel | Co-production company(s) |
|---|---|---|---|
| 2008 | Watchmen: Motion Comic | iTunes | |
| 2009 | Terminator Salvation: The Machinima Series | Machinima | Wonderland Sound and Vision, The Halcyon Company |
| 2011–2013 | Mortal Kombat: Legacy | Machinima | Warner Bros. Interactive Entertainment, NetherRealm Studios, Contradiction Films |
| 2011 | Aim High | Facebook | Wonderland Sound and Vision, Dolphin Entertainment |
| 2012–2013 | H+: The Digital Series | YouTube | Bad Hat Harry Productions, Dolphin Entertainment |
