= Laura Marano =

American actress and singer (born 1995)

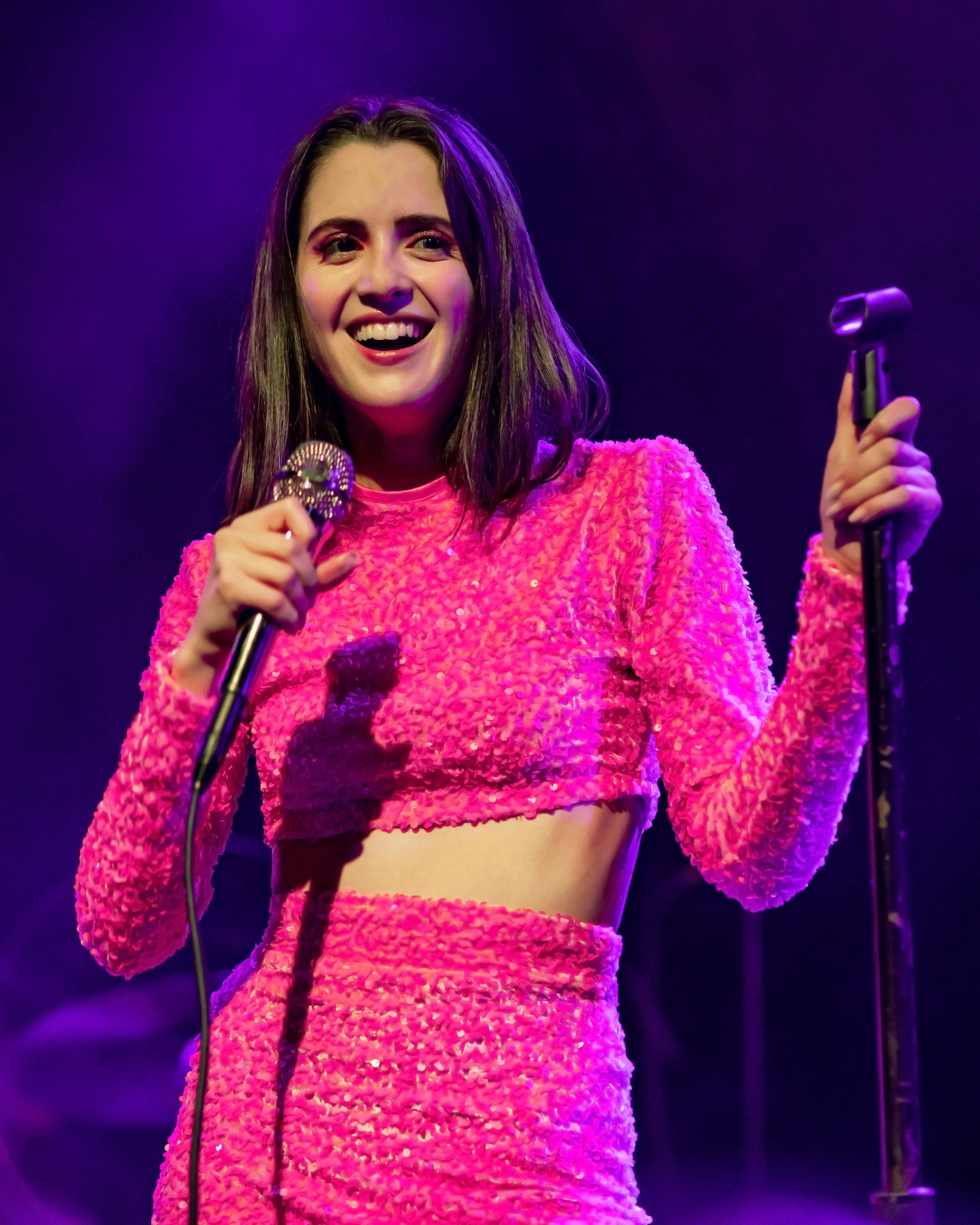
- Marano in 2022
- Born: Laura Marie Marano; November 29, 1995 (age 30); Los Angeles, California, U.S.
- Occupations: Actress; singer; musician
- Years active: 2002–present
- Relatives: Vanessa Marano (sister)
- Musical career
- Genre: Pop
- Instruments: Vocals; piano
- Labels: Big Machine; Warner Bros.
- Website: lauramarano.com

Laura Marie Marano (born November 29, 1995) is an American actress and singer. She is best known for her role as Ally Dawson in the Disney Channel series Austin & Ally. Marano was one of the five original classmates in Are You Smarter than a 5th Grader?. She starred in Without a Trace for three seasons and Back to You. Marano starred in the indie film A Sort of Homecoming, the Disney Channel Original Movie Bad Hair Day (both 2015), the fifth installment of the A Cinderella Story film series A Cinderella Story: Christmas Wish, the Netflix original movie The Perfect Date (both 2019), and the Netflix interactive romcom Choose Love (2023).

In 2015, she signed with Big Machine Records and released her debut single "Boombox" on March 11, 2016, and "La La" later that year. On October 5, 2018, Laura Marano released the single "Me" as an independent artist.

== Early life ==
Marano was born in Los Angeles, California. She is the younger daughter of college professor Damiano Marano and former actress Ellen (née Sweeney) Marano, who owns the Agoura Children's Theatre. Her father is of Italian descent. Marano was first introduced to acting at her mother's theatre. At age five, Marano began expressing interest in acting professionally to her parents along with her older sister Vanessa, who is also an actress. Marano began learning to play the piano, at age nine.

Marano attended traditional school while she worked, even when she booked a full-time job on Austin & Ally, instead of doing school on set. "I go to an actual high school and my friends and everybody there have been so supportive," said Marano in 2013. "It's nice when I'm not working to go to that school and be surrounded by really supportive friends." In 2015 Marano enrolled at the University of Southern California majoring in philosophy, politics and law.

== Career ==
=== 2003–2010: Without a Trace and Back to You ===
Marano's first acting role was when she was five years old. Since then, she worked for multiple productions at the Stage Door Theater. She has appeared in numerous commercials and had small roles on Ghost Whisperer, Medical Investigation, Huff and Joan of Arcadia. Her bigger roles in television have been in Without a Trace and other shows. She played the child role of Keira Knightley's character in the film The Jacket and had a small flashback role in the film Superbad. She was a regular cast member on the Fox game show, Are You Smarter than a 5th Grader? and played the role of Gracie Carr on FOX's sitcom Back to You. Marano has since appeared in several episodes of The Sarah Silverman Program. Initially she was cast in the pilot episode, "Batteries", as the child version of Sarah Silverman, and the writers liked her so much they brought her back for a larger role as a girl Sarah coaches to win a beauty pageant ("Not Without My Daughter"). On the DVD commentary track, co-star Brian Posehn notes that Marano knew everyone else's lines better than they did. She also appeared in Dexter as the child version of Debra Morgan, and in Heroes as Alice Shaw, the child version of Diana Scarwid's character.

=== 2011–2016: Austin & Ally and radio ===
In 2011, Marano had her breakout role as Ally Dawson on the Disney Channel series Austin & Ally. In 2013, Marano recorded four solo songs and one duet with Ross Lynch for the soundtrack album Austin & Ally: Turn It Up. "Me and You" debuted within the U.S. Billboard Kid Digital Songs chart at number thirteen before rising to the sixth spot, spending eleven weeks on the chart. "Redial" debuted at number nineteen before peaking at number eighteen, spending four weeks on the chart. Also in 2013, Marano recorded a duet with her Austin & Ally co-star Ross Lynch entitled "I Love Christmas" for Disney Channel's third holiday compilation album, Holidays Unwrapped. On November 25, 2013, the song was released as a promotional single. On December 14, "I Love Christmas" debuted within the U.S. Billboard Holiday Digital Songs chart peaking at number fifty.

In 2014, Marano voiced Rachel in four episodes of Randy Cunningham: 9th Grade Ninja. She also appeared as Hammu in Fish Hooks and as Fangs in Liv and Maddie. Also in 2014, she appeared in a music video produced for British pop-rock group The Vamps and American singer Demi Lovato called "Somebody to You". In March 2015, Marano stated that she had signed a record deal with Universal's Big Machine Records. In the same year, Marano starred in Disney Channel's Original Movie, Bad Hair Day alongside Leigh-Allyn Baker, playing Monica Reeves, the film's main protagonist. The film was first released on February 6, 2015, on Disney Channel and had its premiere broadcast in the US on February 13. She also starred as the young version of Amy in A Sort of Homecoming, which tells the story of a girl who returns to her home town in Louisiana from her career in New York City. On January 10, 2016, Austin and Ally ended after four seasons.

On January 13, 2016, Marano debuted her own radio talk show on Radio Disney entitled For the Record with Laura Marano. The weekly one-hour show chronicled Marano's journey as she launched her music career, featuring interviews with a guest star in each episode. The show also provided listeners tips on how one can pursue a career in music. The show featured various guest stars including Nick Jonas, Ariana Grande, Meghan Trainor, OneRepublic, Troye Sivan and Zendaya. The first episode of the show, which aired January 12, 2016, guest starred her co-stars of Austin & Ally.

=== 2016–present: Films and music ===
On March 11, 2016, Marano released her debut single called "Boombox". The music video for the single released on April 4, 2016, and accumulated over 6 million views in a week. The video currently holds over 60 million views. It guest stars actor and comedian Ken Jeong, along with his daughter Zooey, and was directed by Cole Walliser. On April 30, 2016, Marano performed the single at the 2016 Radio Disney Music Awards, which aired on Disney Channel on May 1. Marano also performed the song on Today as Elvis Duran's Artist of the Month on May 31, 2016. Marano released her second single, "La La", on August 25, 2016. At the end of 2016, Big Machine Records made the decision to drop all of their pop artists, except for Taylor Swift. On May 18, 2017, it was announced that Marano had signed to Warner Bros. Records in 2017. In 2018, they parted ways, because the people who had signed her left Warner Bros.

On October 1, 2018, Marano announced in a Q&A video posted on her YouTube channel that she would be releasing new music as an independent artist. She named her own label Flip Phone Records, as Marano is known for still using a flip phone. On October 5, 2018, she released the single "Me" . In January 2019, she released the single "Let Me Cry" along with its music video. In February 2019, Marano performed at the Roxy Theatre in Los Angeles and released the single "F.E.O.U.". On March 8, 2019, she released her debut EP, Me, featuring two unheard tracks and a new remix to "F.E.O.U.".

On April 12, 2019, Marano released "A Little Closer", as part of the soundtrack of the Netflix original movie "The Perfect Date", which also sees Marano playing the role of Celia. In June 2019, the Lie To Me music video came out, followed by the F.E.O.U. music video in October of the same year. On November 22, 2019, Marano released both "Me and the Mistletoe" featuring Kurt Hugo Schneider, her first original Christmas single, and the soundtrack of "A Cinderella Story: Christmas Wish", which Marano stars in the movie.

On April 10, 2020, Marano released the single "When You Wake Up", followed by "Can't Hold On Forever" in May of the same year. In June 2020, Marano released the remixes to these past two singles, respectively featuring Mark Diamond and PLTO. In August 2020, the singer released a new single, titled "Honest With You", and during the same month, it was announced that her sophomore EP, titled You, would be coming out in fall of the same year, aiming for an October release. On September 18, 2020, the singer released a fourth single, "Can't Help Myself", along with the announcement of the release date of the EP, "YOU". On September 21, the singer announced her first virtual tour, The YOU Tour, which would take place during the month of October, with four unique live-stream shows every week, from October 3 to 24, with each concert being unique and with a different formulation. On January 22, 2021, the singer released the acoustic version of the single Something To Believe In, whereas the music video was released on February 19, 2021. On March 12, the remix of the single was released in collaboration with DJ AFSHEEN. On April 16, the remix of the single, Honest With You, with the Malaysian singer Alextbh, was released. On May 21, the remix of Can't Help Myself was released, featuring Jean Deaux and produced by Poe Leos and on the same day, the deluxe version of the EP, YOU, was announced.

On September 24, 2021, the singer released the single I Wanna Know What It's Like. On December 31, 2021, the single Dance With You was released, featuring the electronic duo Grey, whereas on January 20, 2022, the single "Worst Kind of Hurt", with singer-songwriter Wrabel was released. Both songs are part of the soundtrack of the Netflix rom-com, The Royal Treatment, in which Marano also stars, released in January 2022. In February, a live performance of Worst Kind Of Hurt featuring Wrabel was released on Marano's YouTube channel, whereas the music video for Dance With You was released in March. Moreover, Marano and Michael Trewartha from Grey performed the song on The Kelly Clarkson Show during the same month. In March 2022, the singer announced her first national concert tour, The Us Tour, set for summer 2022 and counting of 22 dates across the United States. On tour Marano performed several tracks on piano and with her band, which consisted of Mark Diamond on guitar and Ross Hodgkinson on drums.

Later that month, it was announced that Marano was to lead Netflix's interactive rom-com, Choose Love.

On July 31, 2023, Marano announced I May Be An Actress, but I Can't Fake How I Feel, her debut studio album which was released on September 15, 2023.

== Philanthropy ==
In August 2013, Marano was named the 2013 UNICEF's Trick-or-Treat for UNICEF Ambassador, which encouraged children to raise money on Halloween to help children around the world. About the campaign, Laura said "I'm so excited to celebrate Halloween this year by encouraging kids to support UNICEF's lifesaving work. The Trick-or-Treat for UNICEF campaign is a fun, easy way for kids to learn about world issues and to help other kids who are less fortunate." In August 2014, Marano was ambassador for the Disney and Birds Eye Vegetables campaign 'Step up to the plate'. The campaign's goal is to encourage children in the United States to explore healthy foods such as vegetables. In April 2019, Laura Marano hosted a fashion show for Childhelp during National Child Abuse Prevention Month.

== Filmography ==
=== Film ===
Year	Title	Role	Notes	Ref.
2003	Finding Nemo	Additional voices		
2005	The Jacket	Young Jackie		
2006	Ice Age: The Meltdown	Additional voices		
2007	Superbad	Young Becca		
2015	A Sort of Homecoming	Young Amy		
2015	Alvin and the Chipmunks: The Road Chip	Hotel Babysitter		
2017	Lady Bird	Diana Greenway		
2019	The Perfect Date	Celia Lieberman	Netflix release	
2019	Saving Zoë	Echo	Also producer	
2019	A Cinderella Story: Christmas Wish	Kat Decker	Direct-to-video film	
2020	This Is The Year	Hipster Gal		
2020	The War with Grandpa	Mia Decker		
2022	The Royal Treatment	Isabella "Izzy"	Netflix release; also co-producer	
2023	Choose Love	Cami Conway	Netflix release	
2025	You	Herself	Short film; also director, writer and producer	
2025	Last Train to Fortune	Amanda		
2026	Original Sound	Ryan Reed		
2026	Above & Below	Tatiana		
TBD	Borderline		Post-production	
TBD	Silk Theory		Pre-production	
TBD	House of Holloway	Grace	Post-production; also executive producer	

=== Television ===
Year	Title	Role	Notes
2003–2006	Without a Trace	Kate Malone	Recurring role (seasons 2–4)
2004	Joan of Arcadia	Emily	Episode: "Night Without Stars"
2005	Medical Investigation	Brooke Beck	Episode: "Tribe"
2005–2006	The X's	Scout Y	Main voice role
2006	Ghost Whisperer	Audrey	Episode: "Friendly Neighborhood Ghost"
2006	Huff	Amelia	Episode: "Black Shadows"
2006	Dexter	Young Debra	Episodes: "Let's Give the Boy a Hand", "Father Knows Best"
2007	Are You Smarter than a 5th Grader?	Herself	Judge/Mentor (season 1)
2007–2008	Back to You	Gracie Carr	Main role
2007–2010	The Sarah Silverman Program	Heather Silverman / Young Sarah Silverman	Recurring role
2008	Ni Hao, Kai-Lan	Mei Mei	Voice role; episode: "Kai-Lan's Trip to China"
2008	Gary Unmarried	Louise Brooks	Episodes: "Pilot", "Gary Gets Boundaries"
2009	Heroes	Young Alice Shaw	Episode: "1961"
2009	Little Monk	Cousin Lauren	Episode: "Little Monk and the Monk Cousin"
2010	True Jackson, VP	Molly	Episode: "Little Buddies"
2010	FlashForward	Young Tracy	Episode: "Blowback"
2010	Childrens Hospital	Haley	Episode: "Frankfurthers, Allman Brothers, Death, Frankfurters"
2011–2016	Austin & Ally	Ally Dawson	Main role
2014	Randy Cunningham: 9th Grade Ninja	Rachel	Recurring voice role (season 2)
2014	Fish Hooks	Girl Hamster #2	Voice role; episode: "Algae Day"
2014	Liv and Maddie	Fangs	Special guest star; episode: "Howl-A-Rooney"
2015	Bad Hair Day	Monica Reeves	Television film
2015	Pickle and Peanut	Veronica	Voice role; episodes: "Gory Agnes", "Haunted Couch"
2015	Girl Meets World	Ally Dawson	Special guest star; episode: "Girl Meets World of Terror 2"
2016	Mère et Fille, California Dream	Herself	French television film; Cameo
2019	Super Simple Love Story	Nellie	Unsold television pilot (CBS)
2020	Day by Day	Ellie	Voice role; episode: "Ghost Light"
2020	Robot Chicken	Evie, Linda, Titanic Waitress	Voice role; episode: "Sundancer Craig in: 30% of the Way to Crying"
2021	Nickelodeon's Unfiltered	Herself	Episode: "Kickin' Carrots & Bubbly Tea!"

=== Radio ===
- For the Record with Laura Marano (2016), as Host, for Radio Disney

== Discography ==
=== Studio albums ===
List of albums
Title	Album details
I May Be an Actress, but I Can't Fake How I Feel	Released: September 15, 2023; Format: Digital download, streaming; Label: Flip Phone

=== Soundtrack albums ===
List of albums, with selected chart positions
Title	Details	Peak chart positions	
Title	Details	US	US OST
Austin & Ally: Turn It Up	Released: December 17, 2013; Formats: CD, digital download, streaming; Label: Walt Disney	89	6
Austin & Ally: Take It from the Top	Released: March 31, 2015; Formats: CD, digital download, streaming; Label: Walt Disney	—	23
A Cinderella Story: Christmas Wish	Released: November 22, 2019; Formats: Digital download, streaming; Label: WaterTower	—	—
Original Sound (Original Motion Picture Soundtrack)	Released: April 29, 2026; Formats: LP, Digital download, streaming; Label: 420 Collective Music, Flavorlab Records	—	—
"—" denotes releases that did not chart or were not released in that territory.

=== EPs ===
List of extended plays
Title	Details
Me	Released: March 8, 2019; Label: Flip Phone; Format: Digital download, streaming
You	Released: October 2, 2020; Label: Flip Phone; Format: LP, digital download, streaming
Us	Released: July 8, 2022; Label: Flip Phone; Format: Digital download, streaming

As the music duo Purple & Red, with AFSHEEN

List of extended plays
Title	Details
Christmas Glow	Released: November 27, 2026; Label: Purple & Red Music; Format: Digital download, streaming

=== Singles ===
==== As lead artist ====
List of singles as lead artist, with selected chart positions, showing year released
Title	Year	Peak chart positions	Album
Title	Year	NZ Hot	Album
"Boombox"	2016	—	Non-album singles
"La La"	2016	—	Non-album singles
"Me"	2018	—	Me
"Let Me Cry"	2019	—	Me
"F.E.O.U."	2019	—	Me
"A Little Closer	2019	—	Non-album single
"Everybody Loves Christmas"	2019	—	A Cinderella Story: Christmas Wish
"Me and the Mistletoe" (featuring Kurt Hugo Schneider)	2019	—	Non-album single
"When You Wake Up" (solo or remix with Mark Diamond)	2020	—	You
"Can't Hold On Forever" (solo or remix with PLTO)	2020	—	You
"Honest with You" (solo or remix with Alextbh)	2020	—	You
"Can't Help Myself" (solo or remix featuring Poe Leos and Jean Deaux)	2020	—	You
"Something to Believe In" (solo or remix featuring Afsheen)	2021	—	You
"I Wanna Know What It's Like"	2021	—	Us
"Dance with You" (with Grey)	2021	39	Us
"Worst Kind of Hurt" (with Wrabel)	2022	—	Us
"Breakup Song"	2022	—	Us
"This Time Last Year"	2022	—	I May Be an Actress, but I Can’t Fake How I Feel
"Bad Time Good Time"	2022	—	I May Be an Actress, but I Can’t Fake How I Feel
"Arrow"	2023	—	I May Be an Actress, but I Can’t Fake How I Feel
"Boundaries"	2023	—	I May Be an Actress, but I Can’t Fake How I Feel
"The Valley" (solo or with Ellee Duke)	2023	—	I May Be an Actress, but I Can’t Fake How I Feel
"Brand New Heart"	2023	—	I May Be an Actress, but I Can’t Fake How I Feel
"All I Want Is You" (Note: "All I Want Is You" was released as a standalone single for the movie Choose Love.)	2023	—	Non-album single
"Powerless" (with Abigail Barlow)	2023	—	I May Be an Actress, but I Can’t Fake How I Feel
"Someday"	2023	—	I May Be an Actress, but I Can’t Fake How I Feel
"Boombox" (remix with emlyn)	2026	—	Non-album single

==== As a featured artist ====
List of singles as a featured artist, with selected chart positions, showing year released and album name
Title	Year	Peak chart positions	Album
Title	Year	NZ	Album
"Weekend" (BoTalks featuring Laura Marano)	2018	—	Non-album single

==== Promotional singles ====
Title	Year	Peak chart positions	Album
"Words"	2010	—	Non-album promotional single
"I Love Christmas" (with Ross Lynch)	2013	50 (US Holiday)	Holidays Unwrapped

=== Other charted songs ===
List of singles, with selected chart positions
Title	Year	Peak chart positions	Album
"Me and You"	2013	6	Austin & Ally: Turn It Up
"Parachute"	2013	6	Austin & Ally: Turn It Up
"Redial"	2013	18	Austin & Ally: Turn It Up
"You Can Come to Me" (with Ross Lynch)	2014	12	Disney Channel Play It Loud
"The Me That You Don't You See"	2014	18	Disney Channel Play It Loud
"Austin & Ally Glee Club Mash Up" (with Ross Lynch, Calum Worthy and Raini Rodriguez)	2014	10	Disney Channel Play It Loud

==== Guest appearances ====
Title	Year	Other artist(s)	Album
"Shine"	2012	—N/a	Disney Fairies: Faith, Trust, and Pixie Dust

=== Music videos ===
Title	Year	Director(s)	Ref.
"Words"	2010	Catherine Kimmel and Peter Waldman	
"For the Ride"	2015	Érik Canuel	
"Boombox"	2016	Cole Walliser	
"Miraculous Ladybug" (Theme Song)	2016	Cole Walliser	
"Me"	2018	Cole Walliser	
"Let Me Cry"	2019	Noah Kentis	
"Lie to Me"	2019	Cole Walliser	
"F.E.O.U."	2019	Izac Rappaport	
"Me and the Mistletoe"	2019	Paul Khoury and Wesley Quinn	
"Something to Believe In"	2021	Izak Rappaport	
"Honest with You" (Remix) (with Alextbh)	2021	Cole Walliser	
"Worst Kind of Hurt" (Live Video) (with Wrabel)	2022	Betawave Media Group	
"Dance With You" (with Grey)	2022	Cole Walliser	
"Arrow"	2023	Robert Marrero	
"Boundaries"	2023	Robert Marrero	
"The Valley"	2023	Robert Marrero	
"Someday"	2023	Vanessa Marano	
"You (Baggage)"	2025	Laura Marano and Vanessa Marano	

==== Guest appearances ====
Title	Year	Artist(s)	Director(s)	Ref.
"Heard It on the Radio"	2012	Ross Lynch	Matt Stawski	
"Somebody to You"	2014	The Vamps and Demi Lovato	Emil Nava	
"Freya vs. Ravenna"	2016	Princess Rap Battle	Whitney Avalon	

== Live performances and tours ==
=== Musical theater ===
Year	Production	Role	Director	Venue	Ref.
2026	The 25th Annual Putnam County Spelling Bee	Logainne Schwartzandgrubenierre	Danny Mefford	New World Stages, New York	

=== Headlining tours ===
- The Us Tour (2022)

=== Concerts ===
- Laura Marano at The Roxy (2019)
- The You Tour: A four-date live stream tour (2020)
- Sundays with Laura and You: A seven-date live stream concert series (2021)
- A Good Time with Laura Marano (2023)

== Awards and nominations ==
Year	Award	Category	Work	Result	Ref.
2014	Teen Choice Awards	Choice TV Actress: Comedy	Austin & Ally	Nominated	
2015	Kids' Choice Awards	Favorite TV Actress	Austin & Ally	Won	
2015	Remi Awards	Rising Actress	A Sort of Homecoming	Won	
2015	Teen Choice Awards	Choice Summer TV Star: Female	Austin & Ally	Nominated	
2015	Teen Choice Awards	Choice TV: Chemistry (with Ross Lynch)	Austin & Ally	Nominated	
2016	Kids' Choice Awards	Favorite Female TV Star	Austin & Ally	Nominated	
2016	Teen Choice Awards	Choice TV Actress: Comedy	Austin & Ally	Nominated	
2016	Streamy Awards	Original Song	Boombox	Nominated	
2017	Detroit Film Critics Society	Miglior Ensemble	The cast of Lady Bird	Nominated	
2017	San Diego Film Critics Society	Best Cast	The cast of Lady Bird	Nominated	
2017	Seattle Film Critics Society	Best Ensemble	The cast of Lady Bird	Nominated	
2017	Florida Film Critics Circle	Best Cast	The cast of Lady Bird	Nominated	
2017	Online Film Critics Society	Best Ensemble	The cast of Lady Bird	Nominated	
2018	Critics' Choice Movie Awards	Best Acting Ensemble	The cast of Lady Bird	Nominated	
2018	Georgia Film Critics Association	Best Ensemble	The cast of Lady Bird	Nominated	
2019	Teen Choice Awards	Choice Comedy Movie Actress	The Perfect Date	Won	
2019	Teen Choice Awards	Choice Movie Ship (with Noah Centineo)	The Perfect Date	Nominated	
2022	Thirst Project	Cameron Boyce Pioneering Spirit Award	-	Won	
