= Sister Swap =

Film series

- Written by: Erik Patterson; Jessica Scott; Claire Boyles; Zac Hug
- Directed by: Sean McNamara
- Starring: Kimberly Williams-Paisley; Ashley Williams
- Countries of origin: United States; Canada
- Original language: English
- No. of episodes: 2 (list of episodes)

Production
- Executive producers: Neal Dodson; Ashley Williams; Kimberly Williams-Paisley
- Producer: David M. Wulf
- Cinematography: Jeremy Prusso

Original release
- Network: Hallmark Channel
- Release: December 5 – December 12, 2021

Sister Swap is an American series of TV films, starring sisters Kimberly Williams-Paisley and Ashley Williams. They were filmed at the Tower Theatre and other locations in Salt Lake City. They were originally broadcast on Hallmark Channel, as part of the channel's "Countdown to Christmas" seasonal programming.

In December 2022, Dan Harmon posted on social media that he found both films to be the same film with much the same dialogue and scenes, but with different edits and some scenes shot from different angles. Williams-Paisley responded that Hallmark had let the crew enact her sister Ashley Williams's "idea of two films that take place in the same time frame and sometimes overlap", and producer Neal Dodson explained that "We had one editor and edited them in tandem. They share 9 scenes, with different edits to those scenes that favour whichever sister's movie it is."

== Main cast ==
Character	Sister Swap	
Character	A Hometown Holiday	Christmas in the City
Jennifer Swift	Kimberly Williams-Paisley	Kimberly Williams-Paisley
Meg Swift	Ashley Williams	Ashley Williams
Joe	Keith Robinson	Keith Robinson
Simon	Jacob Buster	Jacob Buster
Debbie	Anna Holbrook	Anna Holbrook
Uncle Dave	Kevin Nealon	Kevin Nealon
Eric Baker	Mark Deklin	not in film
Barb Hutter	Susan Yeagley	not in film
Tree Lot Worker	not in film	Bryan Bernardi

== Films ==
No.	Title	Directed by	Written by	Original release date
1	"Sister Swap: A Hometown Holiday"	Sean McNamara	Erik Patterson, Jessica Scott, Claire Boyles & Zac Hug	December 5, 2021
2	"Sister Swap: Christmas in the City"	Sean McNamara	Erik Patterson, Jessica Scott, Claire Boyles & Zac Hug	December 12, 2021

== Production and filming ==
On September 22, 2021, Hallmark announced that the movie series would be part of Hallmark Channel's 2021 "Countdown to Christmas" season block.

== Release ==
Sister Swap: A Hometown Holiday premiered on Hallmark Channel on December 5, 2021.

Sister Swap: Christmas in the City premiered on Hallmark Channel on December 12, 2021.
