= Cinderella (name) =

- Pronunciation: /ˌsɪndəˈrɛlə/
- Gender: Female

Origin
- Origin: coined from cinder
- Meaning: Cinder girl

Other names
- Short forms: Cinders, Cindy
- Related names: Cenerentola (Italian), Cendrillon (French), Aschenputtel (German)

Cinderella is a feminine given name.

It was first used as the English name of a fairytale character but is now a given name in its own right.

== Notable people with the given name ==
- Cindy Sanyu (born 1985), Ugandan musician
- Cinderella Obeñita (born 1996), Filipino model

== Fictional characters ==
- Cinderella Jackson, a character in the television series Sherwood (2022 TV series) played by Safia Oakley-Green
- Cinderella (Disney character), a princess from Disney’s film Cinderella (1950 film)
