= A Cinderella Story: Once Upon a Song =

2011 film by Damon Santostefano

- DVD cover
- Directed by: Damon Santostefano
- Written by: Erik Patterson; Jessica Scott
- Based on: A Cinderella Story by Leigh Dunlap
- Produced by: Dylan Sellers; Michelle Johnston
- Starring: Lucy Hale; Freddie Stroma; Megan Park; Matthew Lintz; Missi Pyle
- Cinematography: John Peters
- Edited by: Tony Lombardo
- Music by: Braden Kimbell
- Production company: Dylan Sellers Productions
- Distributed by: Warner Bros. Pictures (Note: Released under the Warner Premiere label.)
- Release date: September 6, 2011
- Running time: 88 minutes
- Country: United States
- Language: English

A Cinderella Story: Once Upon a Song is a 2011 American musical teen comedy directed by Damon Santostefano and starring Lucy Hale, Freddie Stroma, Megan Park, Matthew Lintz and Missi Pyle. It is a stand-alone sequel to Another Cinderella Story (2008) and the third installment in A Cinderella Story series. In the film, a teenager dreams of being a singer, but her cruel stepmother and stepsister do everything they can to stop her from succeeding. When a new boy comes to school, she tries to get his attention using her voice. The film was released on DVD and digital on September 6, 2011, and premiered on ABC Family on January 22, 2012. The film was followed by A Cinderella Story: If the Shoe Fits (2016).

== Plot ==
Teenage aspiring singer, Katie Gibbs, is over-worked, bullied, and constantly harassed by her adoptive family, the Van Ravensways — shallow stepmother, Gail, bratty older adoptive sister, Beverly "Bev," and troublemaking adoptive younger brother, Victor. Despite how badly they treat her, Katie does what they want with no complaints in fear that Gail will place her back into foster care, her parents having died prior to the events of the movie.

In a dream, Katie performs a music video for her hit single ("Run This Town"). Then Victor wakes her up, demanding breakfast. At the Wellesley Academy of the Arts, of which Gail is headmistress, Guy Morgan — English president of Kensington Records, enrolls his son, Luke, at the school. Katie, wanting to change her life for the better, sneaks her demo CD into Guy's briefcase. Guy wants Luke to produce an upcoming showcase at the Academy; Luke, however, is less than excited about following in his dad's footsteps.

Back at home, Bev wants to win a recording contract with Guy: Bev, however, is a terrible singer; the more she practices, the worse she sounds. Guy calls Gail on Katie's cell phone, who is shocked to hear that he loves Katie's demo ("Bless Myself"). Gail lies, claiming it was Bev's and that Katie stole it. Meanwhile, Victor steals Katie's clothes and towel while she showers, and locks her out of the house, naked. Unable to get back inside, Katie trips over a visiting Luke; thinking fast, she covers herself up using the WELCOME mat. Amused by the situation, Luke gives her his jacket. While Bev welcomes Luke, Gail barges into Katie's room and forces her to sing. Then, after shoving Luke out of the house, Gail plans to get Bev a record deal by using Katie's voice. Bev is reluctant but goes along with this in order to win Luke's affection.

At school, Katie and her best friend, aspiring dancer Angela, hear Luke singing in the music room with his best friend, Mickey O'Malley, ("Knockin"). The entranced Katie writes a song of her own for him and admits that she likes him. Angela urges Katie to sing for him at the Bollywood Ball that night, and gives her a costume to wear. Then Gail barges in, forcing Angela to hide.

Gail orders her stepdaughter to babysit Victor tonight since she wants Bev to win Luke over at the Ball. Katie pleads with Ravi, Gail's guru (who is no real guru but just a half-Italian/half-Indian method actor and former KFC worker from New Jersey, named Tony Gupta) to watch Victor while she goes to the Ball. There Katie leads Luke outside and sings ("Extra Ordinary"). He is entranced by her voice. Angela distracts and challenges Gail to a Bollywood dance-off ("Oh Mere Dilruba"). Gail loses and then leaves the Ball. Katie tries to beat her stepmother at home, but with no success. Gail blackmails Katie by vowing to expel Angela from the Academy, which will ruin her chances of getting into Juilliard — unless Katie sings for Bev. To save Angela's dance career, Katie goes along with Gail's plot. Gail informs Katie that she's grounded for disobeying her and going to the Ball.

Luke wants to find the girl who sang for him, despite Ms. Dorothy Plumberg the assistant principal trying to punish him with detention and being chased by a crazy girl. In the music room, he sees Bev lip-syncing to Katie's voice ("Make You Believe"). Jumping to the obvious but wrong conclusion, Luke falls for Bev and invites her to write more songs with him. Much to Bev's horror, he treats her out to a restaurant that evening. Luke is amazed by Bev's musical aptitude, unaware that Katie is texting to her what she should say (because Bev forced her to help), but ends in disaster. The next day, Luke drops by the house and hits it off with Victor, to whom he gives guitar lessons. Katie also reconnects with Luke, who doesn't like it when she has to head out again — this time, to throw away Gail's prized portrait that French painter, Maurice, was doing for her, which Victor has ruined by cutting out her face with his mother's Gandhi knife. Bev cuts in on Luke, whom she then forces her brother to help her deceive by using miniature electronic-communication devices so that Katie can coach her through another date. Katie puts together a song on the spot ("Possibilities"), which Luke sings, thinking it's Bev's. She and Luke share a kiss, which breaks Katie's heart.

Luke falls in love with Bev, unaware that her singing and songwriting talents are actually Katie's. Later, to ensure Katie's cooperation, Gail reveals that she has discovered a loophole that allows her access to the savings account Katie's late father had opened for his daughter; ergo, if Katie doesn't submit to her adoptive family's will, Gail will cut her off without a cent. Victor overhears, learning in the process that his family's money is rightfully Katie's. Victor himself is frequently mistreated by his sister and their mom; he shares no more affection with them than Katie does, and he only goes along with their mistreatment of Katie because he is fearful of what they would do to him if he didn't. Feeling guilty over not having had a better relationship with his stepsister over the years — among other things, she's the only one who remembers his birthday — Victor agrees to help expose the fraud perpetrated by his family.

At the showcase, Victor sabotages Bev's performance of "Make You Believe" by destroying her iPhone which contains Katie's recorded singing voice, to Gail's anger, and Katie and Bev's worry. Frantically trying to cover up the situation by telling the audience that her mic has stopped working, Bev is booed by the audience. Gail, refusing to give up, forces Katie to sing live backstage. Curious, Luke goes backstage to see what's happening; and he sees Katie. At first, he is confused as Katie tries to get him to leave, but she soon admits to Luke that Bev can't sing. He realizes at last that Bev is a fake and that voice is actually Katie's.

During Bev's second performance, Luke steals a video camera and films Katie singing backstage, thus exposing the whole charade. At the same time, Angela pushes Katie onto the stage to finish the song, much to Bev's humiliation as she runs off. The audience and Luke persuade Katie onstage to perform her demo ("Bless Myself"). Katie and Luke admit their feelings for each other and kiss and embrace. Guy also loves Katie's performance, and green-lights Luke to produce an album for her, which is for Kensington Records. He even agrees to help Angela get into Juilliard.

In a mid-credits scene, Gail weakly attempts to appeal to Guy, but having had enough of her lies, he decides to tell the school board of her deceit and fraud, causing her to be removed as headmistress of Wellesley Academy. To Gail's surprise, even Bev is delighted to be rid of her mother, being no stranger herself to Gail's manipulative ways. Gail soon finds herself back where she started decades before: singing (horribly) at a ranch, where she is bombarded with fruit and booed off the stage.

== Cast ==
- Lucy Hale as Katie Gibbs
- Freddie Stroma as Luke Morgan
- Missi Pyle as Gail Van Ravensway
- Megan Park as Beverly "Bev" Van Ravensway
- Matthew Lintz as Victor Van Ravensway
- Jessalyn Wanlim as Angela
- Manu Narayan as Ravi / Tony Gupta
- Titus Makin Jr. as Mickey O'Malley
- Dikran Tulaine as Guy Morgan
- Lucy Davenport as Ms. Plumberg
- Onira Tares as Crazy Girl
- Madison McMillin as Girl Nearby

== Soundtrack ==
A Cinderella Story: Once Upon a Song

Soundtrack album by Various artists
- Released: September 6, 2011
- Recorded: 2011
- Genres: Pop; pop rock
- Length: 31:31
- Label: WaterTower Music

Singles from A Cinderella Story: Once Upon a Song
- 1. "Run This Town" Released: June 24, 2011; 2. "Bless Myself" Released: August 18, 2011

Professional ratings
Review scores
Source	Rating
AllMusic	2.5/5 stars

The accompanying soundtrack album was released on September 6, 2011 by WaterTower Music (the same day as the film's release).

Track listing

No.	Title	Performer(s)	Length
1.	"Run This Town"	Lucy Hale	3:55
2.	"Bless Myself"	Lucy Hale	3:41
3.	"Make You Believe"	Lucy Hale	3:31
4.	"Knockin"	Freddie Stroma	2:59
5.	"Extra Ordinary"	Lucy Hale	2:58
6.	"Oh Mere Dilruba"	Manu Narayan	3:24
7.	"Possibilities"	Freddie Stroma	3:13
8.	"Twisted Serenade"	Big Pain Ticket	2:26
9.	"Knockin"	Oral Majority	2:28
10.	"Crazy Girl"	The Co-Writes	2:56
Total length:			31:31

Sample credit

- "Bless Myself" contains an interpolation of the 1964 song "You Really Got Me" by The Kinks.

Songs that are not included on the soundtrack album:

- "She's Terrible" by Lucy Hale
- "I Ain't Gonna Leap" by Missi Pyle
- "Party All Night" by Fabio Legarda
- "I Love the Way You Love Me" by Onira Tares (as Crazy Girl)
- "Caribbean Girl" by Fabio Legarda
- "Not My Color, Not My Size" by James Renald
- "Out Here" by Oral Majority
- "Ramón's Jam" by Ramón Stagnaro
- "Make You Believe" by Missi Pyle
- "Amazing Grace" by John Newton

== Critical reception ==
Mike McGranaghan of The Aisle Seat scored the film one and 1/2 out of four, said: "A Cinderella Story: Once Upon a Song is like a movie version of iCarly or Victorious or any of those other tween girl shows that combine broad physical humor, mild expressions of pubescent sexuality and fantasies of becoming famous". The DVD Sleuth gave the film 1 out of 2.
