= Jake Monaco =

American film and TV composer

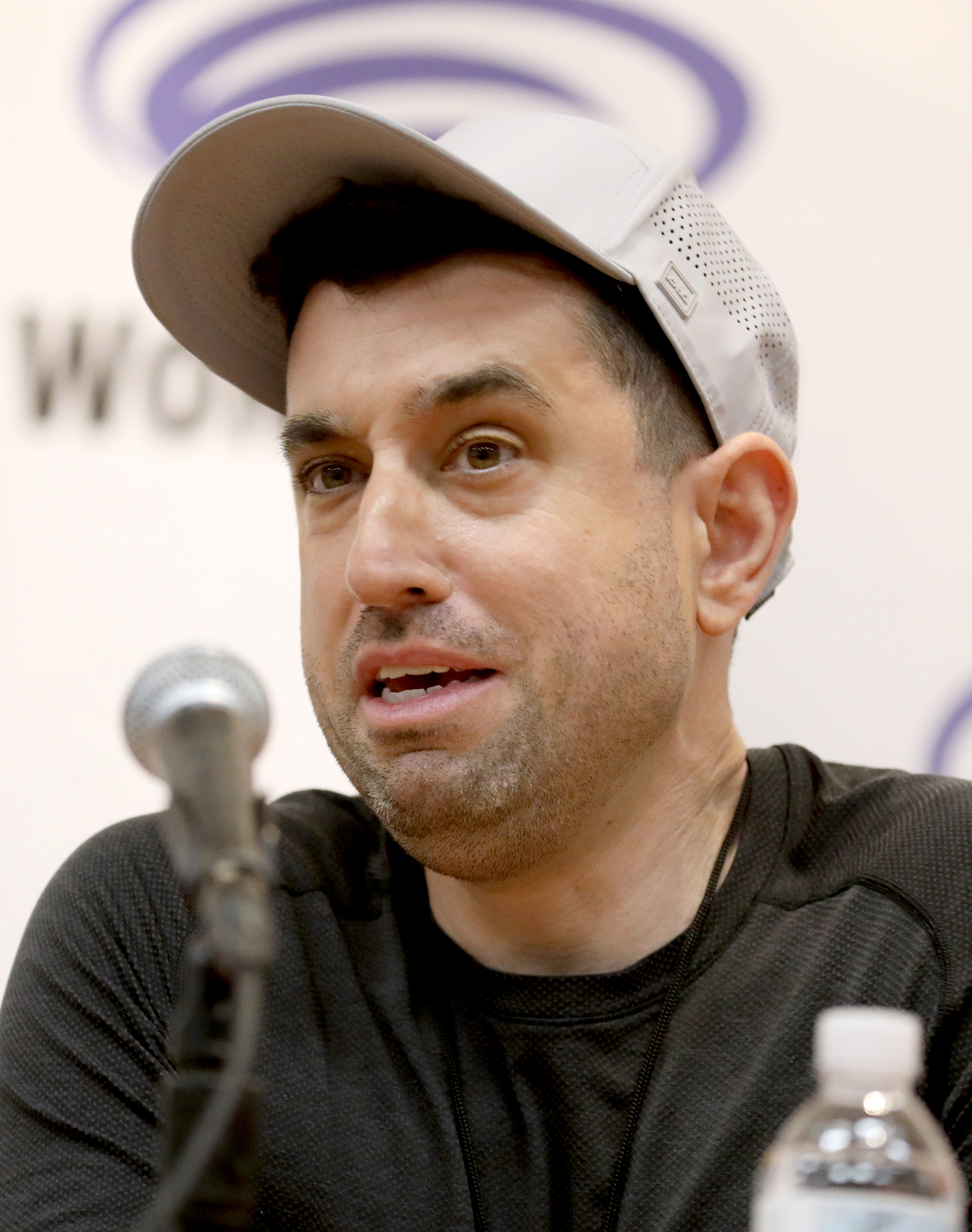
- Monaco at the 2024 WonderCon

Background information
- Genres: Orchestral, Classical, Ambient, Rock
- Occupations: Composer, Arranger, Instrumentalist
- Instruments: Guitar, Piano, Bass
- Years active: 2007-present

Jake Monaco is an American film and TV composer. He currently scores Amazon Prime Video's The Stinky & Dirty Show, Netflix's Dinotrux, and Warner Bros. Animation's Be Cool, Scooby-Doo!. He also provided scores for Disney+ originals, specifically Cars on the Road, and Toy Story specials Lamp Life and Forky Asks a Question.

== Career ==
Monaco began playing guitar in high school, later touring with a group while attending the University of Richmond in Virginia. A few years after graduating, his bandmates opted to take up non-musical professional careers.

At the suggestion of a friend, Monaco enrolled in a film scoring course at University of Southern California. He has stated that although he had never had interest in scoring as a child, it was these classes that piqued his interest, explaining that he was "sucked in" to the world of scoring almost immediately.

Monaco began assisting for composer Christophe Beck after graduating from the USC program, and through this connection he has contributed music to The Hangover film series, The Muppets, and Get Hard. Monaco credits the time he spent assisting Beck as key to his success as a scorer, and has described assistant positions as "some of the best education and experience a young composer can receive". After assisting Christophe Beck for eight years, Monaco made the decision to begin scoring on his own.

Monaco credits some of his inspiration as a composer to a stable of unorthodox stringed instruments he acquired from Rich Briggs. Monaco's studio includes custom-built guitars including a hub cap guitar, a copper pot guitar and a wine box bass.

== Discography ==
=== Feature films ===
Year	Title	Director	Notes
2010	Role/Play	Rob Williams	—N/a
2012	Struck by Lightning	Brian Dannelly	—N/a
2012	The Men Next Door	Rob Williams	—N/a
2013	Kilimanjaro	Walter Strafford	—N/a
2013	Living on One Dollar	Zach Ingrasci; Sean Leonard; Chris Temple	—N/a
2014	Out to Kill	Rob Williams	—N/a
2014	Let's Be Cops	Luke Greenfield	Composed with Christophe Beck
2014	Playing It Cool	Justin Reardon	—N/a
2016	Kindergarten Cop 2	Don Michael Paul	—N/a
2016	Absolutely Fabulous: The Movie	Mandie Fletcher	—N/a
2016	A Cinderella Story: If the Shoe Fits	Michelle Johnston	—N/a
2016	Keeping Up with the Joneses	Greg Mottola	—N/a
2018	Scooby-Doo! and the Gourmet Ghost	Doug Murphy	Composed with Matthew Janszen
2018	Dumplin'	Anne Fletcher	—N/a
2019	Through the Windows	Petey Barma; Bret 'Brook' Parker	—N/a
2019	A Cinderella Story: Christmas Wish	Michelle Johnston	—N/a
2020	Walkaway Joe	Tom Wright	Composed with Christophe Beck
2020	Think Like a Dog	Gil Junger	—N/a
2021	Flora & Ulysses	Lena Khan	—N/a
2021	A Cinderella Story: Starstruck	Michelle Johnston	Composed with Brittany Dunton
2026	Seekers of Infinite Love	Victoria Strouse	—N/a

=== Short films ===
Year	Title	Director	Notes
2005	Stuck	Adam Kargman	—N/a
2007	Routine	Scott Brown	—N/a
2007	Union Station	Beth Spitalny	—N/a
2008	Better than Astronauts	Jonathan Barenboim	—N/a
2008	Secret Circles, Hidden Prayers	Amber Beard	—N/a
2008	The Orphan	Dan Treharne	—N/a
2009	Roses	Trish Hadley	—N/a
2009	Elevated	Jared Mark	—N/a
2009	Point of Entry	Zeus Quijano Jr.	—N/a
2010	Where Life Is	Coyote Marino	—N/a
2010	A Tall Tale	Brittany Biggs	—N/a
2010	I Suck	Jason Bowers	—N/a
2011	Blunderkind	Zak Mechanic	—N/a
2011	The Lepidoctor	Jonathan Barenboim	—N/a
2012	The Road We've Traveled	Davis Guggenheim	—N/a
2013	The Magic Bracelet	Jon Poll	—N/a
2017	Again	Alexis Jacknow	—N/a
2018	Yellow is the New Black	Serguei Kouchnerov; Fabien Polack	—N/a
2019	Santa's Little Helpers	Bruno Chauffard; Derek Drymon	—N/a
2020	Lamp Life	Valerie LaPointe	—N/a
2020	Out	Steven Clay Hunter	—N/a
