= A Cinderella Story: If the Shoe Fits =

2016 film by Michelle Johnston

- DVD cover
- Directed by: Michelle Johnston
- Written by: Elena Song
- Based on: A Cinderella Story by Leigh Dunlap
- Produced by: Dylan Sellers; Michelle Johnston
- Starring: Sofia Carson; Thomas Law; Amy Louise Wilson; Jazzara Jaslyn; Jennifer Tilly
- Cinematography: Robert Brinkmann
- Edited by: David Finfer; Lawrence Jordan
- Music by: Jake Monaco
- Distributed by: Warner Home Video
- Release dates: August 2, 2016 (Digital); August 16, 2016 (DVD)
- Running time: 93 minutes
- Country: United States
- Language: English

A Cinderella Story: If the Shoe Fits is a 2016 American musical teen comedy directed by Michelle Johnston (in her directorial debut) and starring Sofia Carson, Thomas Law and Jennifer Tilly. It is the fourth installment in A Cinderella Story series. The film was released digitally on August 2, 2016, and on DVD on August 16, 2016. It premiered on Freeform on November 27, 2016 with 1.11 million viewers tuning in. It also aired on Disney Channel on January 16, 2017 and was watched by 2.13 million viewers.

It was followed by A Cinderella Story: Christmas Wish in 2019.

== Plot ==
Tessa is a mechanic, who has been left in the care of her stepmother, Divine, and stepsisters, Athena and Olympia, following her father's death. Tessa accompanies her stepsisters as their assistant to a competitive audition for a Cinderella musical being held in a luxurious hotel. On the first day of the auditions, the director, Freddie Marks, introduces the leading male star of the musical, Reed West, with whom Tessa immediately becomes smitten. Freddie adds that auditions will be open to all and whoever is cast in the lead female role will be signed to a recording contract on the final day of the show. Tessa befriends Georgie, a make-up artist for the show, and helps two stage hands fix up a motorcycle that will be used in the show. Reed comes across her work and mistakes Tessa for a man.

During lunch, Tessa witnesses the hotel staff members performing and when encouraged to show off her own skills, she realizes she wants to audition for the show. However, Tessa's stepfamily forbids her to audition so Georgie offers to help. Georgie gives Tessa a full-makeover and she assumes a fake identity for the audition. Tessa's audition goes well, and she impresses both Reed and Freddie with her singing. During the dance audition, Tessa's stepfamily barges into the theater to try to catch who the mysterious new competitor is. Tessa manages to escape, but leaves her dance shoe behind. She tells Georgie that while she wants to do the show, she is too afraid to go against her stepfamily.

The next day, Reed announces that he has found his "Cinderella." He holds up the dance shoe that Tessa left behind and announces that whoever can turn in the matching shoe by midnight will win the part. Divine demands that Tessa recreate a copy of the shoe so either one of her daughters can win the part. Tessa is then summoned back to the stage to help the stage crew fix the motorbike and she runs into Reed. The two bond and she confides in him about the death of her father. Reed encourages Tessa to follow her dreams, but the romantic moment is interrupted when Reed gets a call from Harper Halston, his female co-star.

Nearing midnight, Tessa ponders what to do if her father was alive, then goes to Reed and Freddie to turn in her other dance shoe. She is given the lead role and she assumes the stage name "Bella Snow." Tessa makes excuses to her stepfamily why she is suddenly so busy and secretly attends rehearsals in her "Bella Snow" disguise. Tessa's romantic attraction to Reed increases as they work together, but Freddie tells Tessa that Reed is already engaged to Harper. Disappointed, Tessa begins distancing herself from Reed for the rest of rehearsals, much to his confusion. Athena and Olympia overhear Tessa complaining to Georgie about the stresses of her dual identities and discover her secret.

On the day of the musical's premiere, Athena and Olympia send a note to Tessa, pretending to be from Georgie asking Tessa to meet her in a closed-off section of the hotel. They lock her in a room and head to the stage in an attempt to take the lead role for themselves. Reed tries to ask Georgie about "Bella" and Georgie tells Reed not to lead "Bella" romantically and Freddie told her about his engagement. Meanwhile, Tessa escapes the room via the air vent and rushes to the stage in time for the musical performance.

As the musical begins, chaos erupts due to Tessa's stepfamily trying to take the lead role for themselves. Reed uses an opportunity to go offstage and confront Freddie about meddling in his love life. As they argue, Tessa arrives in time to overhear Reed announce that he and Harper aren't engaged and they're just friends, and he has fallen in love with someone else. Tessa finally appears onstage but without her "Bella" disguise, thus revealing her true identity to everyone, including Reed. Reed apologizes to her for the misunderstanding and convinces her to finish the performance with him. Tessa accepts and with the show back on track, it is well received by the audience. Freddie apologizes to Reed for his actions, and he is forgiven. Tessa receives her record contract and Divine attempts to convince Tessa to rejoin the family, but Tessa rebuffs her. The film ends with Reed and Tessa riding off together into the sunset on the motorcycle she fixed.

== Cast ==
- Sofia Carson as Tessa
- Thomas Law as Reed West
- Amy Louise Wilson as Athena
- Jazzara Jaslyn as Olympia
- Jennifer Tilly as Divine
- Nicole Fortuin as Georgie
- David Ury as Freddie Marks

== Soundtrack ==
A Cinderella Story: If the Shoe Fits

Soundtrack album by Various artists
- Released: August 2, 2016
- Recorded: 2016
- Genre: Music
- Length: 37:18
- Label: WaterTower Music

A Cinderella Story: If the Shoe Fits is a soundtrack album by the film of the same name, released on August 2, 2016 by WaterTower Music (The same day as the film's release).

=== Track listing ===
No.	Title	Performer(s)	Length
1.	"Full Throttle"	Sofia Carson	3:22
2.	"Get Loose"	Thomas Law	2:18
3.	"Stuck on the Outside"	Thomas Law	4:00
4.	"Do You"	Nicole Fortuin and Sofia Carson	2:29
5.	"Stick Up"	Chick Norris	2:49
6.	"Reach for the Stars"	Love Kelli	3:07
7.	"Stuck on the Outside"	Sofia Carson	4:00
8.	"Game On"	C.J. Ryan	3:32
9.	"Why Don't I"	Sofia Carson	2:08
10.	"If the Shoe Fits"	Thomas Law	3:22
11.	"Why Don't I (Duet)"	Sofia Carson and Thomas Law	2:54
12.	"Clap Your Hands"	Leo Soul	3:17
Total length:			37:18
