= Marcus T. Paulk =

American actor

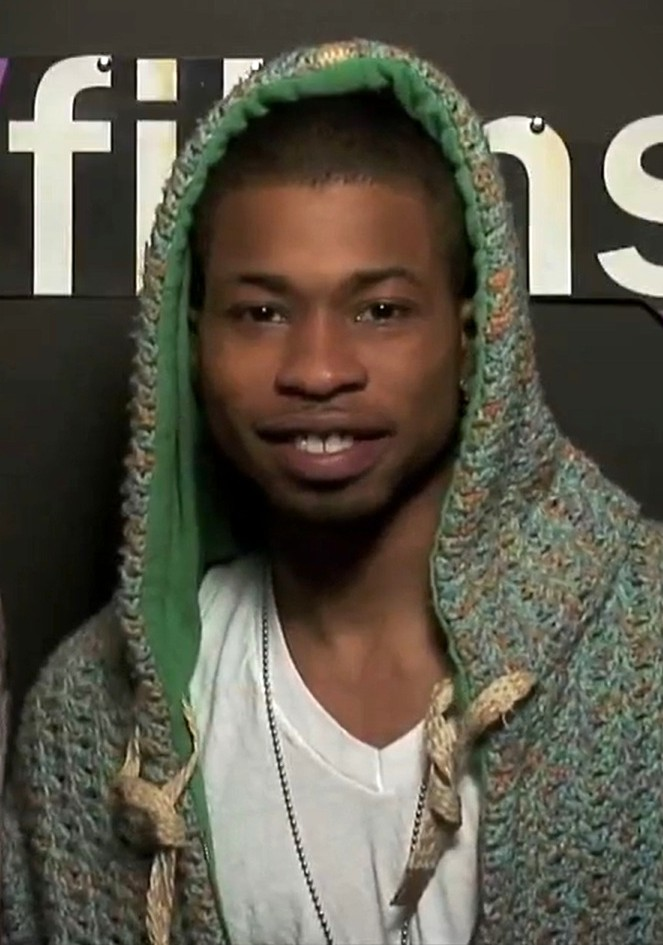
- Paulk in 2009
- Born: Marcus Terrell Paulk; October 12, 1986 (age 39); Los Angeles, California, U.S.
- Occupations: Actor; rapper; dancer
- Years active: 1990–present

Marcus Terrell Paulk (born October 12, 1986) is an American actor, singer, rapper and dancer best known for his role as Myles Mitchell in the UPN sitcom Moesha, which aired from 1996 through 2001. Being a proponent of good causes and a frequent participant in fund raisers, Paulk was the 1997 national spokesperson for the "Kids Are Paramount" campaign, which seeks to empower children with courage and confidence to overcome obstacles.

He also appeared with Bow Wow in the 2005 film Roll Bounce, Another Cinderella Story as Dustin, and with Antonio Banderas in the 2006 film Take the Lead. Paulk is currently working on a studio album. Further details for this project are TBA. Paulk has also made appearances in Season 4 of The Bad Girls Club. In 2012, Marcus appeared in the film Red Tails. Paulk also starred in the 2015 feature film Sister Code with Amber Rose.

== Legal issues ==
On February 3, 2015, Paulk was arrested for alleged DUI in Scottsdale, Arizona. Authorities stated that he smoked pot earlier that day and had drunk Hennessy cognac, his blood-alcohol was registered at 0.109 percent. On February 9, Paulk plead guilty to the charge and was sentenced to a year of unsupervised probation.

== Filmography ==
Year	Title	Role	Notes
1993	Grace Under Fire	Food Group: Bread	1 episode
1994	The Sinbad Show	Unknown	1 episode credited as Marcus Paulk
1994	Thea	Cedric	1 episode
1994	Martin	Marvin	Season 3, episode 8 ("Momma's Baby, Martin's Maybe")
1994	The Fresh Prince of Bel-Air	Boy on dad's back	Season 4, episode 24 ("Papa's Got a Brand New Excuse"), uncredited
1994–1995	Me and the Boys	Ryan	2 episodes
1995	The Crew	Boy at Christmas Party	1 episode
1995	The Parent 'Hood	Phil	1 episode
1996–2001	Moesha	Myles Mitchell	127 episodes
1997	Nothing to Lose	Joey Davidson	Film
1997	One Night Stand	Young Charlie Carlyle	Film
1998	3rd Rock from the Sun	Jimmy	1 episode
1998	Safety Patrol	Walt Whitman	TV film
1999	The Parkers	Myles Mitchell	1 episode
1999	City Guys	Stevie	1 episode
2001	The Nightmare Room	Ryan	1 episode
2001–2004	The Proud Family	Myron Lewinski	4 episodes
2002	The Hughleys	Little V.	1 episode
2003	Fillmore!	Sonny Lombard	1 episode (voice)
2003	Family Affair	Josh	1 episode
2003	Cedric the Entertainer Presents	Darrin	1 episode
2004	Going to the Mat	Boy playing baseball	TV film
2005	Roll Bounce	Boo	Film
2006	Take the Lead	Eddie	Film
2007	Taking Five	Lincoln	Film
2008	Another Cinderella Story	Dustin/The Funk	Film
2008	Extreme Movie	Wyatt	Film
2008	High School Musical 3: Senior Year	Boy at Troy's Party	Uncredited cameo
2009	The Bad Girls Club	Himself	3 episodes
2009	The Adventures of Umbweki	Nosha	Film
2010	The Rig	Andrew	Film
2012	Red Tails	David "Deke" Watkins	Film
2012	Mr. Box Office	Jimmy	1 episode
2012	David E. Talbert's Suddenly Single	Sylvester Stone Jr.	TV film
2015	SisterCode	Lil Danger	Film
2015	Black-ish	Scootie	TV series
2018	Probaphope short	Bart	Short film
2018	NBA short	Fantasy Short Player	Short film
2022–present	The Proud Family: Louder and Prouder	Myron Lewinski	TV series
2023	Deadly Intent	Unknown	

== Commercials ==
Year	Product	Role	Notes
2000	Yoplait Go-Gurt		
2003	State Farm Auto Insurance		
2004	Sprite		
2012	Honda Civic Clearance Event	Tim Taylor, the Wingman	
