= A Cinderella Story: Starstruck =

2021 film by Michelle Johnston

- Official DVD cover
- Directed by: Michelle Johnston
- Written by: Michelle Johnston
- Based on: A Cinderella Story by Leigh Dunlap
- Produced by: Dylan Sellers; Michelle Johnston
- Starring: Bailee Madison; Michael Evans Behling
- Cinematography: Geoff Wallace
- Edited by: Richard Schwadel
- Music by: Jake Monaco; Brittany Dunton
- Production company: Dylan Sellers Productions
- Distributed by: Warner Bros. Home Entertainment
- Release date: June 29, 2021
- Running time: 100 minutes
- Country: United States
- Language: English

A Cinderella Story: Starstruck is a 2021 American musical teen comedy written and directed by Michelle Johnston and starring Bailee Madison and Michael Evans Behling. It is a stand-alone sequel to A Cinderella Story: Christmas Wish (2019), and the sixth and final installment of A Cinderella Story film series. The film was released digitally on June 29, 2021, and on DVD on July 13, 2021.

== Plot ==
Finley Tremaine lives on a farm with her stepmother Valerian, stepbrother Kale, and stepsister Saffron in Dreary, Idaho. They make her do all the chores and sleep in the cold barn, but she dreams of one day becoming an actress. They learn popular actor Jackson Stone will film a musical about Billy the Kid in Dreary. The family plans to audition, but say Finley can only come if she finishes her chores. She succeeds, but they order her to take her pet pig, Jon Ham, to the butcher and reveal they plan to sell their home, ignoring her protests that her deceased father built it.

Finley takes Jon Ham to the veterinarian instead, but he is not there, so she goes to the auditions. She auditions by demonstrating her skills at singing, guitar, and the lasso. Jon Ham slips his leash and runs wild. Finley tries to lasso him, but gets pulled into the mud just as her family arrives. Jackson helps her up and was impressed by her performance. They become attracted to each other, but guards drag him away and the director, Trevor, orders her to leave and not come back.

Jackson tries to learn Finley's name, but gets no help from Trevor because the pig antics held back production for a day. The next day, Valerian and Saffron go to the auditions with Kale as their manager. Finley gets the idea to go in disguise as a boy. Valerian and Saffron put on a poor performance and Trevor hires Saffron only for her looks. Finley arrives in her boy disguise saying her name is Huck and gets hired after reciting the theme song of Full House. Valerian volunteers her farm for a filming location, which is accepted, while Finley gets disturbed when Saffron becomes attracted to her Huck guise and hits on "him".

Kale repeatedly tries to suck up to Jackson and become his manager. Jackson is cast as Billy the Kid, Saffron is cast as a saloon girl, and Huck is cast as an enemy in a fight scene. Despite having to change in and out of her disguise to do her chores, the fight scene is filmed perfectly. During a break, Jackson confides in Huck that he would give up being an actor to go back to his uncle's ranch. When the actor Kenny, who was cast as Saffron's love interest, botches a rope trick that Huck does perfectly, Trevor decides to recast Kenny's role with Huck, which horrifies her when she is forced to kiss Saffron.

Valerian and Kale see the real estate agent Louise about selling the property. During a day off from filming, Jackson finally meets Finley and goes on a date with her, but before she can tell him her name, Kale deduces her secret and calls her back. Her stepfamily angrily locks her in the barn. The next day, since Huck cannot be found, Kenny is brought back in, but he repeatedly botches his lines or injures himself. Jon Ham fetches the keys so Finley can escape, and she returns to the set as Huck. However, instead of saying her lines, she removes her disguise, confesses her secret and her feelings for Jackson, and they kiss. Impressed, Trevor offers her a part in a new movie. Louise found Finley's father's will which states Finley is the legal owner of the farm, allowing her to kick her stepfamily out. Jackson decides to retire from acting and look after Finley's farm and animals, allowing her to be the actress she always wanted to be. Touched, she kisses him again.

== Cast ==
- Bailee Madison as Finley Tremaine
- Michael Evans Behling as Jackson Stone
- April Telek as Valerian
- Lillian Doucet-Roche as Saffron. Doucet-Roche also appeared as Joy Decker in Christmas Wish.
- Richard Harmon as Kale
- Matty Finochio as Trevor
- Karen Holness as Bernie
- Ricky He as Kenny
- Dolores Drake as Louise

== Production ==
The film was shot in Vancouver, Canada on the Kent Farm in 2020, during the COVID-19 pandemic.

== Release ==
A Cinderella Story: Starstruck was released digitally on June 29, 2021, and on DVD on July 13, 2021.
