= A Cinderella Story: Christmas Wish =

2019 film by Michelle Johnston

- DVD cover
- Directed by: Michelle Johnston
- Written by: Michelle Johnston
- Based on: A Cinderella Story by Leigh Dunlap
- Produced by: Dylan Sellers; Michelle Johnston
- Starring: Laura Marano; Gregg Sulkin
- Cinematography: Robert Brinkmann
- Edited by: Matt Friedman
- Music by: Jake Monaco
- Production companies: Blue Ribbon Content; Front Street Pictures Inc.
- Distributed by: Warner Bros. Home Entertainment
- Release date: October 15, 2019
- Running time: 86 minutes
- Country: United States
- Language: English

A Cinderella Story: Christmas Wish is a 2019 American musical teen comedy written and directed by Michelle Johnston and starring Laura Marano and Gregg Sulkin. It is the fifth installment of A Cinderella Story film series. The film was released digitally on October 15, 2019, and DVD on October 29, 2019. Its stand-alone sequel, A Cinderella Story: Starstruck, was released in 2021.

== Plot ==
Katherine "Kat" Decker is a seventeen-year-old girl who dreams of becoming a famous singer-songwriter. However, after the death of her father, Jason, Kat is left in the custody of her cruel and snobbish stepmother, Deirdre, and her two equally cruel and snobby stepsisters, Joy and Grace. They work her to the bone as a servant, have full control of her inheritance, and take a big percentage of her wages from work (theoretically to pay for her disabled dog, Bruno's, food and care). Kat's goal is to make enough money to move out of her home and pursue her dreams.

Kat works at "Santa Land", a Christmas entertainment park, as a singer and songwriter along with her best friend, Isla, under the eye of their strict boss, Mr. Mujiza. There they meet a teenage boy who is the new Santa. Unknown to them he is really Dominic "Nick" Wintergarden, son of billionaire, Terrence Wintergarden. After Nick sees Kat perform, he is smitten by her. Later he confides that he manages a few bands but has never told his dad about this.

Deirdre wants to go to a charity event Terrence is hosting, but she doesn't have a way to get in. Then through Grace's mumbling, she realises that Terrence was Kat's late father's best friend. They devise a plan to gain invitations for the charity event as Deirdre being the widow of the late Jason Decker. However, a letter from Terrence requests the presence of Deirdre and Katherine Decker, so Joy will be impersonating Kat to make the scam work in their favor while leaving the real Kat at home.

As Christmas Eve nears, Nick and Kat become attracted to one another. Nick then gives Kat an invitation to the Wintergarden charity event, much to Kat's surprise and bewilderment, and she accepts the invitation. The next day, Nick reveals his true identity to Kat, and tries to encourage her to do the same but she doesn't. Kat, while reluctant to go to the event with Dominic, is persuaded by Isla to do so when she gives her a green dress they saw at an expensive boutique store which Isla has handsewn herself.

The next morning, however, her stepfamily steal the dress and Deirdre burns her invitation to prevent her from going. Kat calls Isla about what her stepfamily did, and is informed that Dominic has invited her to come over to his home and hear her sing with his friend. When she does come over, Kat gets an unfriendly reception from Nick's friends, especially his girlfriend, Skyler, which eventually causes her to leave.

On the day of the charity event, Kat catches her stepfamily in possession of her late father's snow globe. During the altercation to get it back, the snow globe breaks and Kat is left heartbroken. While she is sobbing, Bruno stumbles upon the invitation letter from Terrence. Realizing their intention of using her identity, she becomes determined to stop them. To help Kat get into the event, Isla uses her position as a dressmaker for the event's main show to help her pass as one of the elf performers. But before Kat can get to Terrence, she is forced to go on stage and perform, which she does poorly. In the middle of the performance, both Deirdre and Nick see Kat and both try to get to her. Skyler tries to get together with Nick, but Nick breaks up with her.

Kat unintentionally knocks out one of the performers in the show, and is forced to be the Snow Queen for the next part. Kat sings. Nick and Kat finally find each other. Nick apologizes for hurting her and Kat apologizes for ruining the show. Before leaving, Nick advises Kat to follow her dreams for her father's sake. Kat then gives a wonderful performance to the audience with a new song she wrote.

After the show, Nick introduces Kat to Terrence. After hearing Kat's problems with her stepfamily and her financial insecurities, Terrence offers to help her as a last wish to his late friend, then he orders Deirdre, Joy and Grace to leave. Nick and Kat finally get to happily dance together.

== Cast ==
- Laura Marano as Kat Decker
- Gregg Sulkin as Dominic "Nick" Wintergarden
- Isabella Gomez as Isla
- Barclay Hope as Terrence Wintergarden
- Maddie Phillips as Skyler
- Johannah Newmarch as Deirdre Decker
- Lillian Doucet-Roche as Joy Decker
- Chanelle Peloso as Grace Decker
- Garfield Wilson as Mr. Mujiza

== Production ==
Principal photography began in March 2019 in Vancouver.

== Soundtrack ==
A Cinderella Story: Christmas Wish

Soundtrack album / EP by Laura Marano
- Released: November 22, 2019
- Recorded: 2019
- Length: 13:25
- Label: WaterTower Music

Singles from A Cinderella Story: Christmas Wish
- 1. "Everybody Loves Christmas" Released: November 1, 2019

The accompanying soundtrack album was released on November 22, 2019, by WaterTower Music.

Track listing

| No. | Title | Performer(s) | Length |
|---|---|---|---|
| 1. | "The Best Christmas" | Laura Marano | 2:08 |
| 2. | "Toys, Toys, Toys" | Laura Marano and Isabella Gomez | 1:48 |
| 3. | "Everybody Loves Christmas" (Solo Piano Version) | Laura Marano | 1:02 |
| 4. | "Santa Brought Me You" | Laura Marano featuring Kris P | 2:50 |
| 5. | "Dance of the Christmas Elves" | The Math Club and Ryan Franks | 2:26 |
| 6. | "Everybody Loves Christmas" | Laura Marano | 3:11 |
| Total length: | | | 13:25 |

Songs that are not included on the soundtrack album:

- "Jingle Bells" by Laura Marano and Isabella Gomez
- "Deck the Halls" by Laura Marano and Isabella Gomez
- "What Elves Are For" by The Math Club and Ryan Franks
- "Fortress" by Opus Orange

== See also ==
- List of Christmas films
