= Another Cinderella Story =

2008 film by Damon Santostefano

- DVD cover
- Directed by: Damon Santostefano
- Written by: Erik Patterson; Jessica Scott
- Based on: A Cinderella Story by Leigh Dunlap
- Produced by: Dylan Sellers
- Starring: Selena Gomez; Drew Seeley; Jane Lynch; Emily Perkins; Katharine Isabelle; Jessica Parker Kennedy; Marcus T. Paulk; Nicole LaPlaca
- Cinematography: Jon Joffin
- Edited by: Tony Lombardo
- Music by: John Paesano
- Production company: Dylan Sellers Productions
- Distributed by: Warner Bros. Pictures (Note: Released under the Warner Premiere label.)
- Release date: September 16, 2008
- Running time: 90 minutes
- Country: United States
- Language: English

Another Cinderella Story is a 2008 American teen musical comedy film directed by Damon Santostefano and written by Erik Patterson and Jessica Scott. The film stars Selena Gomez, Drew Seeley, and Jane Lynch. It is a stand-alone sequel to A Cinderella Story (2004) and the second installment in A Cinderella Story series. Like the first film, it is a retelling of the Cinderella fairy tale in a modern setting. The film had favorable reviews and Gomez won a Young Artist Award for her performance. It was released on DVD on September 16, 2008, and premiered on ABC Family on January 18, 2009. The film was followed by A Cinderella Story: Once Upon a Song (2011).

== Plot ==
High school senior and aspiring dancer Mary Santiago is neglected and abused by her legal guardian, washed-up pop star Dominique Blatt, for whom her deceased mother was a backup dancer. At school, Mary and her best friend Tami are bullied by Dominique's daughters Britt and Bree and their friend Natalia. Famous pop star Joey Parker has returned to school for his senior year, accompanied by his best friend Dustin. He holds a dance contest, the winner of whom will be featured in his upcoming music video. Natalia, Joey's ex-girlfriend, plans to use the contest as a means to get back together with him.

Joey hosts a dance class, which Natalia, Britt, and Bree attend. Mary sneaks behind the one-way mirror and is the only one able to match his moves, but flees after her cell phone. Dominique, hoping to revitalize her career, invites Joey to perform a duet with her, but he refuses, as Dominique previously insulted him on TRL.

The school holds a masquerade ball on Valentine's Day, during which Dominique orders Mary to clean her room by midnight. Tami's sister's boyfriend's family, who own a cleaning service, agree to help so the girls can attend. At the ball, Joey and Mary share a dance, stunning the partygoers with their skills, but Britt and Bree spill a bowl of candy, tripping Mary. Joey helps Mary up and removes his mask, shocking her. Mary realizes she has fifteen minutes before Dominique returns and arrives home in time, but accidentally drops her Zune in the process.

The next day, Joey announces that he has the Zune and enlists students to correctly relay the top four most played songs on it so he can find the "mystery girl." Deducing that Mary is the mystery girl, Britt and Bree threatens to release an embarrassing childhood video of her if she attempts to claim the Zune. Mary tries to do so anyway, but he dismisses her, believing Dominique is using her to convince him to duet with her.

At Britt and Bree's birthday party, they play the video. Humiliated, Mary runs to her room and listens to the song from the ball. Realizing who she is, Joey asks her on a date. Later, Mary receives a letter of acceptance from the Manhattan Academy of Performing Arts, but when they call to confirm it, Dominique answers and claims Mary cannot attend due to an injury.

Hoping to intercept the date, Britt and Bree give Mary an excessive number of chores, but Joey helps her by dancing through them. She helps him write his next song. He invites her over, upon arriving, she sees Natalia and Joey talking in bed; assuming the worst, she runs off in tears. Dominique claims the academy rejected her and insincerely comforts her.

Tami berates Joey for cheating on Mary, but he explains that Natalia broke into his house to drive Mary away. Tami and Dustin convince a still bitter Mary to attend the dance contest, to which Joey has invited a Manhattan Academy representative. After Britt, Bree, and Natalia put on lackluster performances, Joey calls Mary onstage and convinces her to dance with him. The duo performs the song they wrote, after which Joey reveals the truth about his encounter with Natalia. Mary wins the contest. The representative reveals Dominique's lie, and Mary agrees to attend. Joey and Mary kiss. While trying to leave, Dominique falls and breaks both of her legs.

As Mary, Joey, Tami, and Dustin load Mary's belongings into a van, a wheelchair-bound Dominique begs her not to go. Joey and Mary share another kiss before driving away.

== Cast ==
- Selena Gomez as Mary Santiago
- Drew Seeley as Joey Parker
- Jane Lynch as Dominique Blatt
- Katharine Isabelle as Britt Blatt
- Emily Perkins as Bree Blatt
- Jessica Parker Kennedy as Tami
- Marcus T. Paulk as Dustin
- Nicole LaPlaca as Natalia
- Alex Zahara as British director
- Lynda Boyd as Evie Parker
- Garwin Sanford as Rod Parker
- Tiffany Burns as Reporter
- Colin Foo as Lee-Ha
- Lorena Gale as Helga
- Camille Mitchell as Regina Cretikos

== Reception ==
=== Critical response ===
Amber Wilkinson of Eye for Film gave the film four out of five stars and praised the musical aspects, saying that "the song and dance numbers are so well-handled and catchy, it's a shame there aren't more of them." She also said that the "characters are so wafer thin they barely cast a shadow." Although Wilkinson says that the film is completely different from A Cinderella Story, Lacey Walker, reviewing for Christian Answers, notes several aspects of the two films that were directly parallel to each other. Walker also gave it three out of five stars, praising the script, saying the writers "peppered this story with a surprising dose of humor and some pleasing plot twists." However, Walker specifically criticized the "glaringly obvious" age difference between the 15-year-old Gomez and the 26-year-old Seeley.

=== Accolades ===
Award	Date of ceremony	Category	Recipient(s)	Result	Ref.
Writers Guild of America Awards	February 20, 2010	Children's Script – Long Form or Special	Erik Patterson and Jessica Scott	Won	
Young Artist Awards	March 29, 2009	Best Performance in a TV Movie, Miniseries or Special – Leading Young Actress	Selena Gomez	Won	
Young Artist Awards	March 29, 2009	Best Performance in a TV Movie, Miniseries or Special – Supporting Young Actress	Nicole Muñoz	Nominated	
