= Damon Santostefano =

American director, screenwriter (b. 1959)

- Born: August 15, 1959 (age 66); United States
- Occupations: Film director; screenwriter
- Spouse: Mary Stuart Masterson (m. 2000; div. 2004)

Damon Santostefano (born August 15, 1959) is an American film and television director and screenwriter. He is best known for directing the 1999 Warner Brothers feature film Three to Tango starring Matthew Perry, Neve Campbell and Dylan McDermott; Bring It On Again; and the television series Clueless.

== Biography ==
Santostefano was performing stand-up comedy in his hometown of Boston during his teens. While attending New York University Film School he began working professionally as a director, creating short films and documentaries. After college, he established a production company where he developed and directed film and television projects for HBO, Showtime, PBS and Paramount Television. He also directed several Off-Broadway stage productions including plays at The American Place Theatre. For the BAM Festival, he directed Stockhausen's contemporary opera Leben.

Santostefano began a screenwriting career upon selling his first screenplay to Columbia Pictures and has since written and co-written screenplays for several studios.

== Filmography ==
=== Director ===
==== Film ====
- Greenpoint: Turning the Tide (1981) (documentary short)
- Fright Show (1985)
- Scream Greats, Vol. 1 – "Tom Savini, Master of Horror Effects" (1986)
- Scream Greats, Vol. 2 – "Satanism and Witchcraft" (1986)
- Severed Ties (1992)
- Three to Tango (1999)
- Another Cinderella Story (2008)
- Last Man Running (2003)
- Bring It On Again (2004)
- Best Player (2011)
- A Cinderella Story: Once Upon a Song (2011)
- Pure Country: Pure Heart (2017)

==== Television ====
- The Adventures of Pete & Pete – episode "Yellow Fever" (1994)
- Bob and Sully (1995)
- Skwids (1996)
- Clueless (1996)
- The High Life (1996)
- Honey, I Shrunk the Kids: The TV Show (1997)
- The War Next Door (2000)
- The District – episode "Rage Against the Machine" (2001)

=== Writer ===
- Last Man Running (2003)

== Awards ==
- CableACE Award – Best Series (The Adventures of Pete and Pete)

== Personal life ==
Santostefano was engaged to actress Mary Stuart Masterson in 1999. They married in 2000 and divorced in 2004.
